= Chropov =

- Municipality
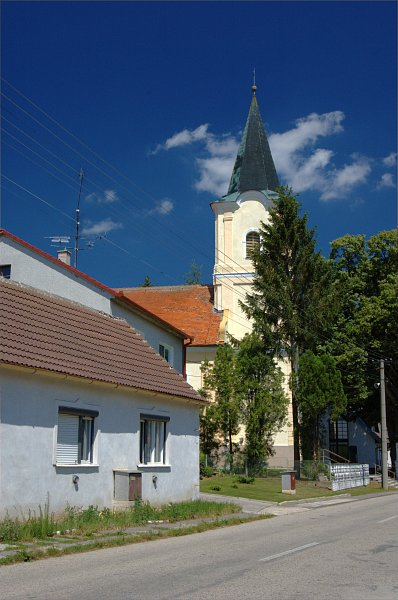
- Church of Saint John of Nepomuk

- Flag

- Location of Chropov in the Trnava Region Location of Chropov in Slovakia
- Coordinates: 48.77°N 17.32°E
- Country: Slovakia
- Region: Trnava Region
- District: Skalica District
- First mentioned: 1262

Area
  - Total: 17.79 km^{2} (6.87 sq mi)
- Elevation: 244 m (801 ft)

Population (2025)
  - Total: 355
- Time zone: UTC+1 (CET)
  - Summer (DST): UTC+2 (CEST)
- Postal code: 908 64
- Area code: +421 34
- Vehicle registration plate (until 2022): SI
- Website: chropov.sk

Chropov (Hungarian: Sziklabánya) is a village and municipality in Skalica District in the Trnava Region of western Slovakia.

== History ==
In historical records the village was first mentioned in 1262.

== Geography ==
The municipality lies at an altitude of 244 metres (801 ft) and covers an area of 17.79 km^{2} (6.87 sq mi) (2025).

== Population ==
Population statistic (10 years)
Year	1995	2005	2015	2025
Count	359	369	389	355
Difference		+2.78%	+5.42%	−8.74%

Population statistic
Year	2024	2025
Count	369	355
Difference		−3.79%

It has a population of 355 people (31 December 2025).

=== Ethnicity ===
Census 2021 (1+ %)
Ethnicity	Number	Fraction
Slovak	366	95.81%
Romani	8	2.09%
Czech	5	1.3%
Not found out	5	1.3%
Total	382	

In year 2021 was 382 people by ethnicity 366 as Slovak, 8 as Romani, 5 as Czech, 5 as Not found out, 1 as Ukrainian, 1 as Russian, 1 as German and 1 as Other.

Note on population: The difference values of population numbers in the table "Population statistic" and in the sections "Ethnicity" & "Religion" is caused by the use of various statistical methods.

=== Religion ===
Census 2021 (1+ %)
Religion	Number	Fraction
Roman Catholic Church	297	77.75%
None	55	14.4%
Evangelical Church	13	3.4%
Not found out	8	2.09%
Total	382	

In year 2021 was 382 people by religion 297 from Roman Catholic Church, 55 from None, 13 from Evangelical Church, 8 from Not found out, 3 from Christian Congregations in Slovakia, 3 from Buddhism, 1 from Paganism and natural spirituality, 1 from Other and 1 from Greek Catholic Church.

== Genealogical resources ==
The records for genealogical research are available at the state archive "Statny Archiv in Bratislava, Slovakia"

- Roman Catholic church records (births/marriages/deaths): 1635-1927 (parish A)

== See also ==
- List of municipalities and towns in Slovakia
