= Oreské, Skalica District =

Oreské
- Municipality
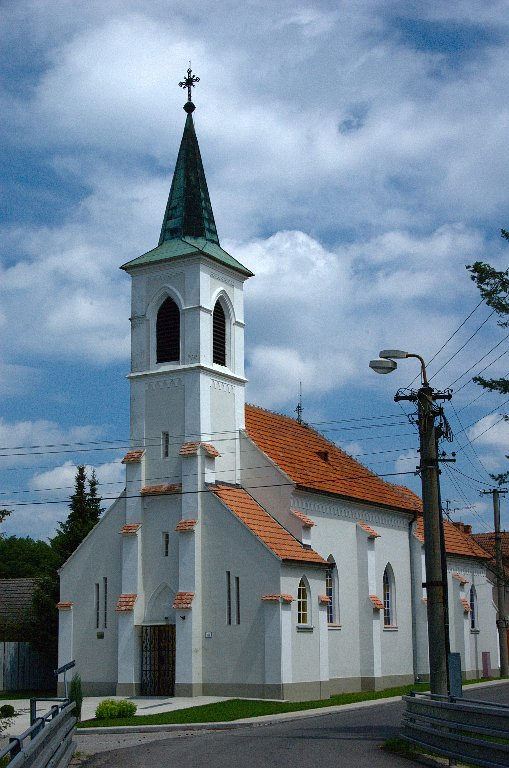

- Flag

- Location of Oreské in the Trnava Region Location of Oreské in Slovakia
- Coordinates: 48°45′0″N 17°18′0″E
- Country: Slovakia
- Region: Trnava Region
- District: Skalica District
- First mentioned: 1392

Area
  - Total: 3.72 km^{2} (1.44 sq mi)
- Elevation: 244 m (801 ft)

Population (2025)
  - Total: 397
- Time zone: UTC+1 (CET)
  - Summer (DST): UTC+2 (CEST)
- Postal code: 908 63
- Area code: +421 34
- Vehicle registration plate (until 2022): SI
- Website: oreske.sk

Oreské (Hungarian: Kisdiós) is a village and municipality in Skalica District in the Trnava Region of western Slovakia.

== History ==
In historical records the village was first mentioned in 1392.

== Geography ==
The municipality lies at an altitude of 244 metres (801 ft) and covers an area of 3.72 km^{2} (1.44 sq mi) (2025).

== Population ==
Population statistic (10 years)
Year	1995	2005	2015	2025
Count	331	346	387	397
Difference		+4.53%	+11.84%	+2.58%

Population statistic
Year	2024	2025
Count	387	397
Difference		+2.58%

It has a population of 397 people (31 December 2025).

=== Ethnicity ===
Census 2021 (1+ %)
Ethnicity	Number	Fraction
Slovak	386	97.72%
Czech	8	2.02%
Not found out	6	1.51%
Total	395	

In year 2021 was 395 people by ethnicity 386 as Slovak, 8 as Czech, 6 as Not found out, 2 as Other and 1 as Russian.

Note on population: The difference values of population numbers in the table "Population statistic" and in the sections "Ethnicity" & "Religion" is caused by the use of various statistical methods.

=== Religion ===
Census 2021 (1+ %)
Religion	Number	Fraction
Roman Catholic Church	341	86.33%
None	45	11.39%
Evangelical Church	4	1.01%
Total	395	

In year 2021 was 395 people by religion 341 from Roman Catholic Church, 45 from None, 4 from Evangelical Church, 2 from Calvinist Church, 1 from Not found out, 1 from Christian Congregations in Slovakia and 1 from Ad hoc movements.
