= Vrádište =

- Municipality
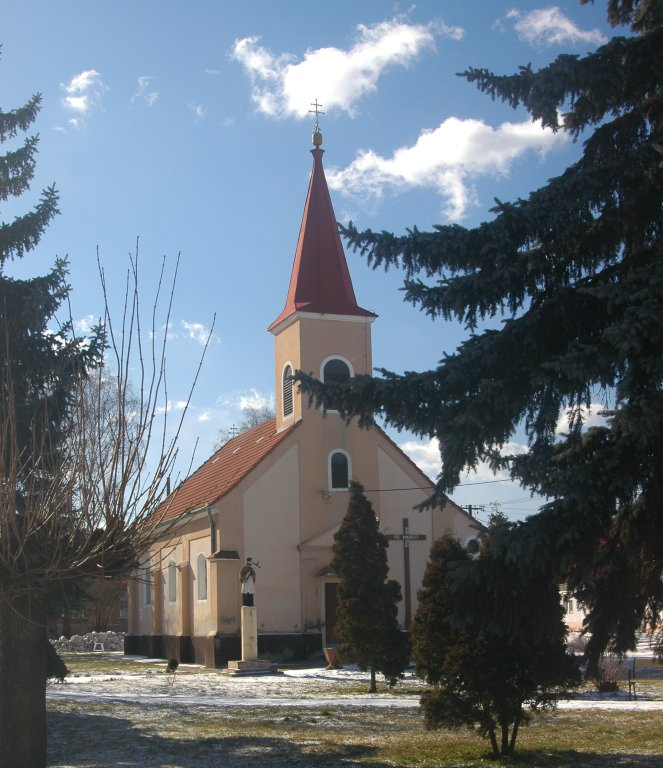

- Flag

- Location of Vrádište in the Trnava Region Location of Vrádište in Slovakia
- Coordinates: 48.82°N 17.20°E
- Country: Slovakia
- Region: Trnava Region
- District: Skalica District
- First mentioned: 1392

Area
  - Total: 4.25 km^{2} (1.64 sq mi)
- Elevation: 170 m (560 ft)

Population (2025)
  - Total: 851
- Time zone: UTC+1 (CET)
  - Summer (DST): UTC+2 (CEST)
- Postal code: 908 49
- Area code: +421 34
- Vehicle registration plate (until 2022): SI
- Website: www.vradiste.sk

Vrádište (Hungarian: Várköz) is a village and municipality in Skalica District in the Trnava Region of western Slovakia.

== History ==
In historical records the village was first mentioned in 1392.

== Geography ==
The municipality lies at an altitude of 170 metres (560 ft) and covers an area of 4.25 km^{2} (1.64 sq mi) (2025).

== Population ==
Population statistic (10 years)
Year	1995	2005	2015	2025
Count	603	680	815	851
Difference		+12.76%	+19.85%	+4.41%

Population statistic
Year	2024	2025
Count	848	851
Difference		+0.35%

It has a population of 851 people (31 December 2025).

=== Ethnicity ===
Census 2021 (1+ %)
Ethnicity	Number	Fraction
Slovak	814	95.53%
Not found out	39	4.57%
Czech	12	1.4%
Total	852	

In year 2021 was 852 people by ethnicity 814 as Slovak, 39 as Not found out, 12 as Czech, 2 as Italian, 2 as Rusyn, 2 as Hungarian, 1 as Austrian and 1 as Other.

Note on population: The difference values of population numbers in the table "Population statistic" and in the sections "Ethnicity" & "Religion" is caused by the use of various statistical methods.

=== Religion ===
Census 2021 (1+ %)
Religion	Number	Fraction
Roman Catholic Church	537	63.03%
None	190	22.3%
Evangelical Church	78	9.15%
Not found out	33	3.87%
Greek Catholic Church	9	1.06%
Total	852	

In year 2021 was 852 people by religion 537 from Roman Catholic Church, 190 from None, 78 from Evangelical Church, 33 from Not found out, 9 from Greek Catholic Church, 1 from Calvinist Church, 1 from Other, 1 from United Methodist Church, 1 from Buddhism and 1 from Ad hoc movements.

== Gallery ==
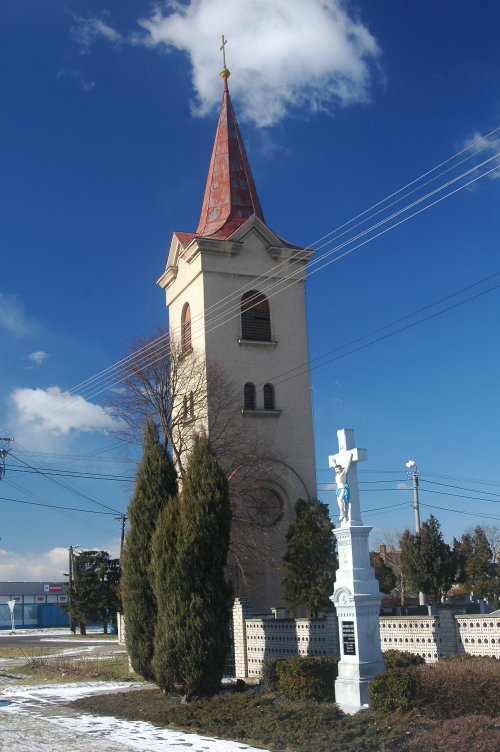
Bell tower
