= Popudinské Močidľany =

- Municipality
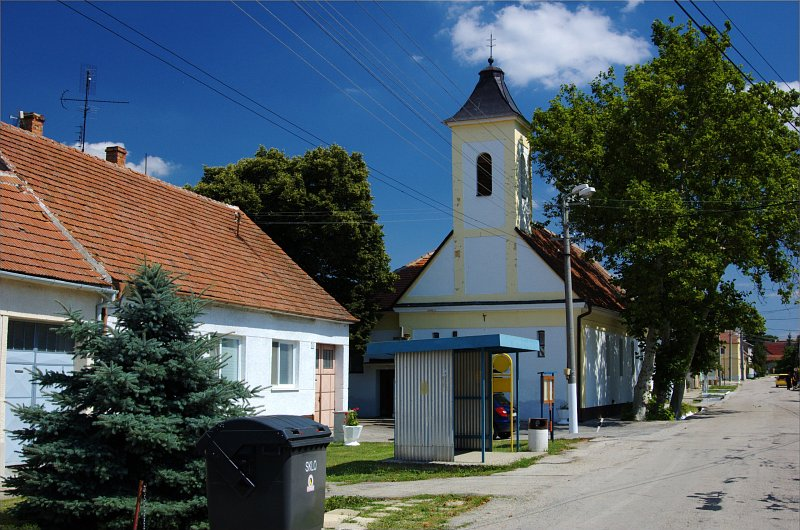

- Flag

- Location of Popudinské Močidľany in the Trnava Region Location of Popudinské Močidľany in Slovakia
- Coordinates: 48.78°N 17.22°E
- Country: Slovakia
- Region: Trnava Region
- District: Skalica District
- First mentioned: 1392

Area
  - Total: 10.82 km^{2} (4.18 sq mi)
- Elevation: 190 m (620 ft)

Population (2025)
  - Total: 981
- Time zone: UTC+1 (CET)
  - Summer (DST): UTC+2 (CEST)
- Postal code: 908 61
- Area code: +421 34
- Vehicle registration plate (until 2022): SI
- Website: popudinskemocidlany.sk

Popudinské Močidľany (Hungarian: Coborfalva) is a village and municipality in Skalica District in the Trnava Region of western Slovakia.

== History ==
In historical records the village was first mentioned in 1392.

== Geography ==
The municipality lies at an altitude of 190 metres (620 ft) and covers an area of 10.82 km^{2} (4.18 sq mi) (2025).

== Population ==
Population statistic (10 years)
Year	1995	2005	2015	2025
Count	821	909	911	981
Difference		+10.71%	+0.22%	+7.68%

Population statistic
Year	2024	2025
Count	990	981
Difference		−0.90%

It has a population of 981 people (31 December 2025).

=== Ethnicity ===
Census 2021 (1+ %)
Ethnicity	Number	Fraction
Slovak	931	96.67%
Romani	35	3.63%
Czech	18	1.86%
Not found out	10	1.03%
Total	963	

In year 2021 was 963 people by ethnicity 931 as Slovak, 35 as Romani, 18 as Czech, 10 as Not found out, 5 as Romanian, 4 as Austrian, 3 as Italian, 1 as Vietnamese, 1 as Rusyn, 1 as Russian, 1 as Polish, 1 as German, 1 as Moravian and 1 as Hungarian.

Note on population: The difference values of population numbers in the table "Population statistic" and in the sections "Ethnicity" & "Religion" is caused by the use of various statistical methods.

=== Religion ===
Census 2021 (1+ %)
Religion	Number	Fraction
Roman Catholic Church	716	74.35%
None	182	18.9%
Evangelical Church	27	2.8%
Not found out	11	1.14%
Greek Catholic Church	11	1.14%
Total	963	

In year 2021 was 963 people by religion 716 from Roman Catholic Church, 182 from None, 27 from Evangelical Church, 11 from Not found out, 11 from Greek Catholic Church, 8 from Christian Congregations in Slovakia, 3 from Jehovah's Witnesses, 2 from Ad hoc movements, 1 from Other, 1 from Czechoslovak Hussite Church and 1 from Buddhism.
