= Nová Polhora =

Municipality of Slovakia

- Municipality
- Flag

- Location of Nová Polhora in the Košice Region Location of Nová Polhora in Slovakia
- Coordinates: 48.83°N 21.32°E
- Country: Slovakia
- Region: Košice Region
- District: Košice-okolie District
- First mentioned: 1954

Area
  - Total: 2.07 km^{2} (0.80 sq mi)
- Elevation: 208 m (682 ft)

Population (2025)
  - Total: 559
- Time zone: UTC+1 (CET)
  - Summer (DST): UTC+2 (CEST)
- Postal code: 444 4
- Area code: +421 55
- Vehicle registration plate (until 2022): KS
- Website: novapolhora.sk/obec/

Nová Polhora is a village and municipality in Košice-okolie District in the Kosice Region of eastern Slovakia.

== History ==
In municipality, it is a relatively new establishment, created in 1954.

== Geography ==
The municipality lies at an altitude of 208 metres (682 ft) and covers an area of 2.07 km^{2} (0.80 sq mi) (2025).

== Population ==
Population statistic (10 years)
Year	1995	2005	2015	2025
Count	341	412	430	559
Difference		+20.82%	+4.36%	+30%

Population statistic
Year	2024	2025
Count	548	559
Difference		+2.00%

It has a population of 559 people (31 December 2025).

=== Ethnicity ===
Census 2021 (1+ %)
Ethnicity	Number	Fraction
Slovak	493	97.81%
Total	504	

In year 2021 was 504 people by ethnicity 493 as Slovak, 5 as Not found out, 4 as Rusyn, 4 as Other, 3 as Czech and 1 as Hungarian.

Note on population: The difference values of population numbers in the table "Population statistic" and in the sections "Ethnicity" & "Religion" is caused by the use of various statistical methods.

=== Religion ===
Census 2021 (1+ %)
Religion	Number	Fraction
Roman Catholic Church	369	73.21%
None	70	13.89%
Greek Catholic Church	40	7.94%
Evangelical Church	13	2.58%
Not found out	6	1.19%
Total	504	

In year 2021 was 504 people by religion 369 from Roman Catholic Church, 70 from None, 40 from Greek Catholic Church, 13 from Evangelical Church, 6 from Not found out, 2 from Calvinist Church, 1 from Old Catholic Church, 1 from Christian Congregations in Slovakia, 1 from Buddhism and 1 from Ad hoc movements.

98 % of population is Slovak in ethnicity.

== Culture ==
The village has a public hall, football ground, and a pub.
