= Lopašov =

- Municipality
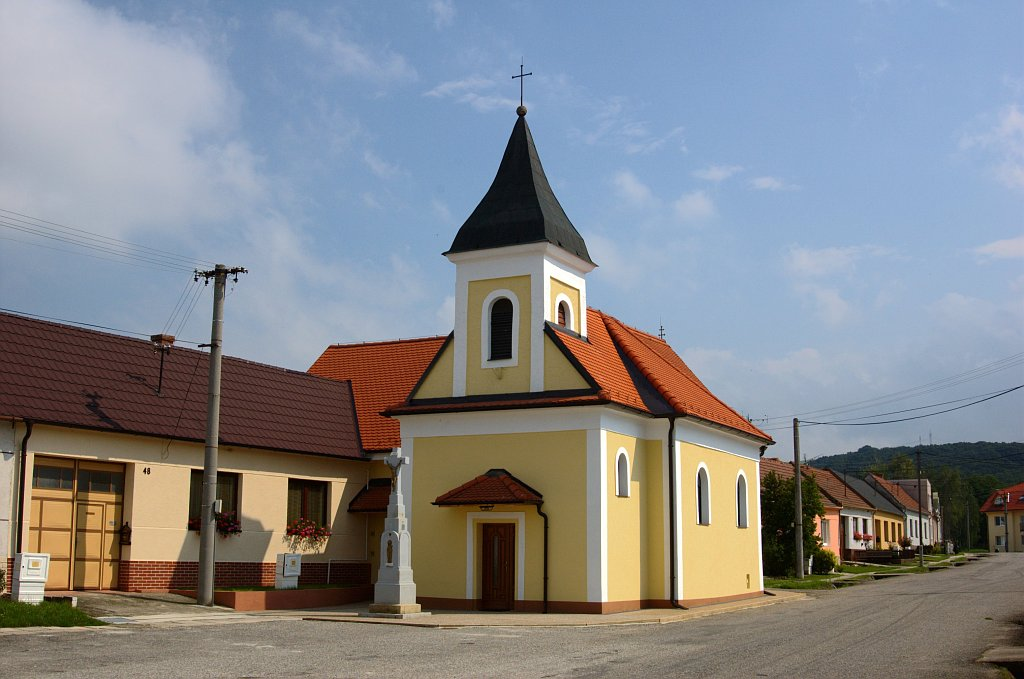

- Flag

- Location of Lopašov in the Trnava Region Location of Lopašov in Slovakia
- Coordinates: 48.75°N 17.33°E
- Country: Slovakia
- Region: Trnava Region
- District: Skalica District
- First mentioned: 1392

Area
  - Total: 5.21 km^{2} (2.01 sq mi)
- Elevation: 265 m (869 ft)

Population (2025)
  - Total: 332
- Time zone: UTC+1 (CET)
  - Summer (DST): UTC+2 (CEST)
- Postal code: 908 63
- Area code: +421 34
- Vehicle registration plate (until 2022): SI
- Website: www.lopasov.sk

Lopašov (Hungarian: Felsőlopassó) is a village and municipality in Skalica District in the Trnava Region of western Slovakia.

== History ==
In historical records the village was first mentioned in 1392.

== Geography ==
The municipality lies at an altitude of 265 metres (869 ft) and covers an area of 5.21 km^{2} (2.01 sq mi) (2025).

== Population ==
Population statistic (10 years)
Year	1995	2005	2015	2025
Count	279	296	331	332
Difference		+6.09%	+11.82%	+0.30%

Population statistic
Year	2024	2025
Count	339	332
Difference		−2.06%

It has a population of 332 people (31 December 2025).

=== Ethnicity ===
Census 2021 (1+ %)
Ethnicity	Number	Fraction
Slovak	328	98.79%
Not found out	6	1.8%
Czech	4	1.2%
Total	332	

In year 2021 was 332 people by ethnicity 328 as Slovak, 6 as Not found out, 4 as Czech, 1 as Italian and 1 as Other.

Note on population: The difference values of population numbers in the table "Population statistic" and in the sections "Ethnicity" & "Religion" is caused by the use of various statistical methods.

=== Religion ===
Census 2021 (1+ %)
Religion	Number	Fraction
Roman Catholic Church	308	92.77%
None	15	4.52%
Evangelical Church	6	1.81%
Total	332	

In year 2021 was 332 people by religion 308 from Roman Catholic Church, 15 from None, 6 from Evangelical Church, 1 from Calvinist Church, 1 from Not found out and 1 from Church of Jesus Christ of Latter-day Saints.
