= Radošovce, Skalica District =

Radošovce
- Municipality
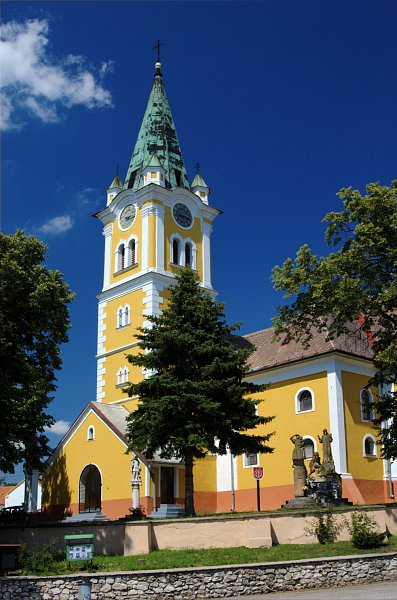

- Flag

- Location of Radošovce in the Trnava Region Location of Radošovce in Slovakia
- Coordinates: 48°46′0″N 17°17′0″E
- Country: Slovakia
- Region: Trnava Region
- District: Skalica District
- First mentioned: 1473

Area
  - Total: 26.59 km^{2} (10.27 sq mi)
- Elevation: 224 m (735 ft)

Population (2025)
  - Total: 1,711
- Time zone: UTC+1 (CET)
  - Summer (DST): UTC+2 (CEST)
- Postal code: 908 63
- Area code: +421 34
- Vehicle registration plate (until 2022): SI
- Website: radosovce.sk

Radošovce (Hungarian: Felsőrados) is a village and municipality in Skalica District in the Trnava Region of western Slovakia.

== History ==
In historical records the village was first mentioned in 1473.

== Geography ==
The municipality lies at an altitude of 224 metres (735 ft) and covers an area of 26.59 km^{2} (10.27 sq mi) (2025).

== Population ==
Population statistic (10 years)
Year	1995	2005	2015	2025
Count	1774	1827	1774	1711
Difference		+2.98%	−2.90%	−3.55%

Population statistic
Year	2024	2025
Count	1733	1711
Difference		−1.26%

It has a population of 1711 people (31 December 2025).

=== Ethnicity ===
Census 2021 (1+ %)
Ethnicity	Number	Fraction
Slovak	1698	95.5%
Not found out	73	4.1%
Total	1778	

In year 2021 was 1778 people by ethnicity 1698 as Slovak, 73 as Not found out, 14 as Czech, 6 as German, 4 as Hungarian, 3 as Russian, 3 as Other, 2 as Romanian, 1 as Italian, 1 as Serbian, 1 as Romani and 1 as Moravian.

Note on population: The difference values of population numbers in the table "Population statistic" and in the sections "Ethnicity" & "Religion" is caused by the use of various statistical methods.

=== Religion ===
Census 2021 (1+ %)
Religion	Number	Fraction
Roman Catholic Church	1410	79.3%
None	246	13.84%
Not found out	71	3.99%
Evangelical Church	26	1.46%
Total	1778	

In year 2021 was 1778 people by religion 1410 from Roman Catholic Church, 246 from None, 71 from Not found out, 26 from Evangelical Church, 6 from Greek Catholic Church, 5 from Baptists Church, 4 from Paganism and natural spirituality, 3 from Other, 2 from Calvinist Church, 1 from Eastern Orthodox Church, 1 from New Apostolic Church, 1 from Christian Congregations in Slovakia, 1 from Seventh-day Adventist Church and 1 from Ad hoc movements.
