= List of municipalities and towns in Slovakia =

Slovakia in Europe

This is an alphabetical list of the 2,891 obcí (singular obec, "municipality") in Slovakia. They are grouped into 79 districts (okresy, singular okres), in turn grouped into 8 regions (kraje, singular kraj); articles on individual districts and regions list their municipalities. The average area of Slovak municipalities is about 16.96 km^{2} (6.55 sq mi) and an average population of about 1,888 people.

== List ==
List is actual for year 2025. Places are sorted by Slovak alphabet.

Place	Region
Ábelová	Banská Bystrica
Abovce	Banská Bystrica
Abrahámovce	Prešov
Abrahámovce	Prešov
Abrahám	Trnava
Abramová	Žilina
Abranovce	Prešov
Adamovské Kochanovce	Trenčín
Adidovce	Prešov
Alekšince	Nitra
Andovce	Nitra
Andrejová	Prešov
Ardanovce	Nitra
Ardovo	Košice
Arnutovce	Košice
Babie	Prešov
Babiná	Banská Bystrica
Babindol	Nitra
Babinec	Banská Bystrica
Babín	Žilina
Báb	Nitra
Bacúch	Banská Bystrica
Bacúrov	Banská Bystrica
Bačka	Košice
Bačkovík	Košice
Bačkov	Košice
Báč	Trnava
Baďan	Banská Bystrica
Bádice	Nitra
Badín	Banská Bystrica
Báhoň	Bratislava
Bajany	Košice
Bajč	Nitra
Bajerovce	Prešov
Bajerov	Prešov
Bajka	Nitra
Bajtava	Nitra
Baka	Trnava
Baláže	Banská Bystrica
Baldovce	Prešov
Balog nad Ipľom	Banská Bystrica
Baloň	Trnava
Baňa	Prešov
Banka	Trnava
Bánovce nad Bebravou	Trenčín
Bánovce nad Ondavou	Košice
Bánov	Nitra
Banská Belá	Banská Bystrica
Banská Bystrica	Banská Bystrica
Banská Štiavnica	Banská Bystrica
Banské	Prešov
Banský Studenec	Banská Bystrica
Bara	Košice
Barca	Banská Bystrica
Bardejov	Prešov
Bardoňovo	Nitra
Bartošova Lehôtka	Banská Bystrica
Bartošovce	Prešov
Baška	Košice
Baškovce	Prešov
Baškovce	Košice
Bašovce	Trnava
Batizovce	Prešov
Bátka	Banská Bystrica
Bátorová	Banská Bystrica
Bátorove Kosihy	Nitra
Bátovce	Nitra
Beckov	Trenčín
Beharovce	Prešov
Becherov	Prešov
Beladice	Nitra
Belá-Dulice	Žilina
Belá nad Cirochou	Prešov
Belá	Nitra
Belá	Žilina
Belejovce	Prešov
Belina	Banská Bystrica
Belín	Banská Bystrica
Belince	Nitra
Bellova Ves	Trnava
Beloveža	Prešov
Beluj	Banská Bystrica
Beluša	Trenčín
Belža	Košice
Beňadiková	Žilina
Beňadikovce	Prešov
Beňadovo	Žilina
Beňatina	Košice
Beniakovce	Košice
Benice	Žilina
Benkovce	Prešov
Beňuš	Banská Bystrica
Bernolákovo	Bratislava
Bertotovce	Prešov
Beša	Nitra
Beša	Košice
Bešeňová	Žilina
Bešeňov	Nitra
Betlanovce	Košice
Betliar	Košice
Bežovce	Košice
Bidovce	Košice
Bielovce	Nitra
Biel	Košice
Biely Kostol	Trnava
Bijacovce	Prešov
Bílkove Humence	Trnava
Bíňa	Nitra
Bíňovce	Trnava
Biskupice	Banská Bystrica
Biskupová	Nitra
Bitarová	Žilina
Blahová	Trnava
Blatná na Ostrove	Trnava
Blatná Polianka	Košice
Blatné	Bratislava
Blatné Remety	Košice
Blatné Revištia	Košice
Blatnica	Žilina
Blažice	Košice
Blažovce	Žilina
Blesovce	Nitra
Blhovce	Banská Bystrica
Bobot	Trenčín
Bobrovček	Žilina
Bobrovec	Žilina
Bobrovník	Žilina
Bobrov	Žilina
Bočiar	Košice
Bodíky	Trnava
Bodiná	Trenčín
Bodorová	Žilina
Bodovce	Prešov
Bodružal	Prešov
Bodza	Nitra
Bodzianske Lúky	Nitra
Bogliarka	Prešov
Bohdanovce	Košice
Bohdanovce nad Trnavou	Trnava
Boheľov	Trnava
Bohunice	Trenčín
Bohunice	Nitra
Bohúňovo	Košice
Bojná	Nitra
Bojnice	Trenčín
Bojničky	Trnava
Boldog	Bratislava
Boleráz	Trnava
Bolešov	Trenčín
Boliarov	Košice
Boľ	Košice
Boľkovce	Banská Bystrica
Borcová	Žilina
Borčany	Trenčín
Borčice	Trenčín
Borinka	Bratislava
Bôrka	Košice
Borová	Trnava
Borovce	Trnava
Borský Mikuláš	Trnava
Borský Svätý Jur	Trnava
Borša	Košice
Bory	Nitra
Bošáca	Trenčín
Bošany	Trenčín
Boťany	Košice
Bottovo	Banská Bystrica
Bracovce	Košice
Branč	Nitra
Branovo	Nitra
Braväcovo	Banská Bystrica
Brdárka	Košice
Brehov	Košice
Brehy	Banská Bystrica
Brekov	Prešov
Brestovany	Trnava
Brestovec	Nitra
Brestovec	Trenčín
Brestov	Prešov
Brestov nad Laborcom	Prešov
Brestov	Prešov
Bretejovce	Prešov
Bretka	Košice
Breza	Žilina
Brezina	Košice
Breziny	Banská Bystrica
Breznica	Prešov
Breznička	Banská Bystrica
Breznička	Prešov
Brezno	Banská Bystrica
Brezolupy	Trenčín
Brezová pod Bradlom	Trenčín
Brezovec	Prešov
Brezovica	Prešov
Brezovica	Žilina
Brezovička	Prešov
Brezovka	Prešov
Brezov	Prešov
Brežany	Prešov
Brežany	Žilina
Brhlovce	Nitra
Brieštie	Žilina
Brodské	Trnava
Brodzany	Trenčín
Brunovce	Trenčín
Brusnica	Prešov
Brusník	Banská Bystrica
Brusno	Banská Bystrica
Brutovce	Prešov
Bruty	Nitra
Brvnište	Trenčín
Brzotín	Košice
Buclovany	Prešov
Bučany	Trnava
Búč	Nitra
Budča	Banská Bystrica
Budikovany	Banská Bystrica
Budimír	Košice
Budiná	Banská Bystrica
Budince	Košice
Budiš	Žilina
Budkovce	Košice
Budmerice	Bratislava
Buglovce	Prešov
Buková	Trnava
Bukovce	Prešov
Bukovec	Košice
Bukovec	Trenčín
Bukovina	Žilina
Bulhary	Banská Bystrica
Bunetice	Košice
Bunkovce	Košice
Bušince	Banská Bystrica
Bušovce	Prešov
Buzica	Košice
Buzitka	Banská Bystrica
Bystrá	Banská Bystrica
Bystrany	Košice
Bystrá	Prešov
Bystré	Prešov
Bystričany	Trenčín
Bystrička	Žilina
Byšta	Košice
Bytča	Žilina
Bzenica	Banská Bystrica
Bzenov	Prešov
Bzince pod Javorinou	Trenčín
Bziny	Žilina
Bzovík	Banská Bystrica
Bzovská Lehôtka	Banská Bystrica
Bžany	Prešov
Cabaj-Čápor	Nitra
Cabov	Prešov
Cakov	Banská Bystrica
Cejkov	Košice
Cernina	Prešov
Cerová	Trnava
Cerovo	Banská Bystrica
Cestice	Košice
Cífer	Trnava
Cigeľka	Prešov
Cigeľ	Trenčín
Cigla	Prešov
Cimenná	Trenčín
Cinobaňa	Banská Bystrica
Čabalovce	Prešov
Čabiny	Prešov
Čab	Nitra
Čabradský Vrbovok	Banská Bystrica
Čadca	Žilina
Čachtice	Trenčín
Čajkov	Nitra
Čakajovce	Nitra
Čaka	Nitra
Čakanovce	Košice
Čakanovce	Banská Bystrica
Čakany	Trnava
Čaklov	Prešov
Čalovec	Nitra
Čamovce	Banská Bystrica
Čaňa	Košice
Čaradice	Nitra
Čáry	Trnava
Častá	Bratislava
Častkovce	Trenčín
Častkov	Trnava
Čataj	Bratislava
Čata	Nitra
Čavoj	Trenčín
Čebovce	Banská Bystrica
Čečehov	Košice
Čečejovce	Košice
Čechynce	Nitra
Čechy	Nitra
Čekovce	Banská Bystrica
Čeľadice	Nitra
Čeľadince	Nitra
Čeláre	Banská Bystrica
Čelkova Lehota	Trenčín
Čeľovce	Košice
Čelovce	Prešov
Čelovce	Banská Bystrica
Čenkovce	Trnava
Čereňany	Trenčín
Čerenčany	Banská Bystrica
Čerhov	Košice
Čerín	Banská Bystrica
Čermany	Nitra
Černík	Nitra
Černina	Prešov
Černochov	Košice
Čertižné	Prešov
Červeňany	Banská Bystrica
Červená Voda	Prešov
Červenica	Prešov
Červenica pri Sabinove	Prešov
Červeník	Trnava
Červený Hrádok	Nitra
Červený Kameň	Trenčín
Červený Kláštor	Prešov
České Brezovo	Banská Bystrica
Čičarovce	Košice
Čičava	Prešov
Čičmany	Žilina
Číčov	Nitra
Čierna	Košice
Čierna Lehota	Trenčín
Čierna Lehota	Košice
Čierna nad Tisou	Košice
Čierna Voda	Trnava
Čierne Kľačany	Nitra
Čierne nad Topľou	Prešov
Čierne Pole	Košice
Čierne	Žilina
Čierny Balog	Banská Bystrica
Čierny Brod	Trnava
Čierny Potok	Banská Bystrica
Čifáre	Nitra
Čiližská Radvaň	Trnava
Čimhová	Žilina
Čirč	Prešov
Čižatice	Košice
Číž	Banská Bystrica
Čoltovo	Košice
Čremošné	Žilina
Čučma	Košice
Čukalovce	Prešov
Dačov Lom	Banská Bystrica
Ďačov	Prešov
Daletice	Prešov
Danišovce	Košice
Ďanová	Žilina
Ďapalovce	Prešov
Dargov	Košice
Davidov (municipality)	Prešov
Debraď	Košice
Dedačov	Prešov
Dedina Mládeže	Nitra
Dedinka	Nitra
Dedinky	Košice
Dechtice	Trnava
Dekýš	Banská Bystrica
Demandice	Nitra
Demänovská Dolina	Žilina
Demjata	Prešov
Detrík	Prešov
Detva	Banská Bystrica
Detvianska Huta	Banská Bystrica
Devičany	Nitra
Devičie	Banská Bystrica
Dežerice	Trenčín
Diaková	Žilina
Diakovce	Nitra
Diviacka Nová Ves	Trenčín
Diviaky nad Nitricou	Trenčín
Divina	Žilina
Divín	Banská Bystrica
Divinka	Žilina
Dlhá nad Kysucou	Žilina
Dlhá nad Oravou	Žilina
Dlhá nad Váhom	Nitra
Dlhá	Trnava
Dlhá Ves	Košice
Dlhé Klčovo	Prešov
Dlhé nad Cirochou	Prešov
Dlhé Pole	Žilina
Dlhé Stráže	Prešov
Dlhoňa	Prešov
Dlžín	Trenčín
Dobrá Niva	Banská Bystrica
Dobrá	Košice
Dobrá Voda	Trnava
Dobroč	Banská Bystrica
Dobrohošť	Trnava
Dobroslava	Prešov
Dobšiná	Košice
Dohňany	Trenčín
Dojč	Trnava
Doľany	Prešov
Doľany	Bratislava
Dolinka	Banská Bystrica
Dolná Breznica	Trenčín
Dolná Krupá	Trnava
Dolná Lehota	Banská Bystrica
Dolná Mariková	Trenčín
Dolná Mičiná	Banská Bystrica
Dolná Poruba	Trenčín
Dolná Seč	Nitra
Dolná Streda	Trnava
Dolná Strehová	Banská Bystrica
Dolná Súča	Trenčín
Dolná Tižina	Žilina
Dolná Trnávka	Banská Bystrica
Dolná Ves	Banská Bystrica
Dolná Ždaňa	Banská Bystrica
Dolné Dubové	Trnava
Dolné Kočkovce	Trenčín
Dolné Lefantovce	Nitra
Dolné Lovčice	Trnava
Dolné Mladonice	Banská Bystrica
Dolné Naštice	Trenčín
Dolné Obdokovce	Nitra
Dolné Orešany	Trnava
Dolné Otrokovce	Trnava
Dolné Plachtince	Banská Bystrica
Dolné Saliby	Trnava
Dolné Semerovce	Nitra
Dolné Srnie	Trenčín
Dolné Strháre	Banská Bystrica
Dolné Trhovište	Trnava
Dolné Vestenice	Trenčín
Dolné Zahorany	Banská Bystrica
Dolné Zelenice	Trnava
Dolný Badín	Banská Bystrica
Dolný Bar	Trnava
Dolný Harmanec	Banská Bystrica
Dolný Hričov	Žilina
Dolný Chotár	Trnava
Dolný Kalník	Žilina
Dolný Kubín	Žilina
Dolný Lieskov	Trenčín
Dolný Lopašov	Trnava
Dolný Ohaj	Nitra
Dolný Pial	Nitra
Dolný Štál	Trnava
Dolný Vadičov	Žilina
Domadice	Nitra
Domaníky	Banská Bystrica
Domaniža	Trenčín
Domaňovce	Prešov
Donovaly	Banská Bystrica
Drábsko	Banská Bystrica
Drahňov	Košice
Drahovce	Trnava
Dravce	Prešov
Dražice	Banská Bystrica
Dražkovce	Žilina
Drážovce	Banská Bystrica
Drienčany	Banská Bystrica
Drienica	Prešov
Drienovec	Košice
Drienovo	Banská Bystrica
Drienov	Prešov
Drienovská Nová Ves	Prešov
Drietoma	Trenčín
Drňa	Banská Bystrica
Drnava	Košice
Družstevná pri Hornáde	Košice
Drženice	Nitra
Držkovce	Banská Bystrica
Ďubákovo	Banská Bystrica
Dubinné	Prešov
Dubnica nad Váhom	Trenčín
Dubnička	Trenčín
Dubník	Nitra
Dubno	Banská Bystrica
Dubodiel	Trenčín
Dubovany	Trnava
Dubová	Bratislava
Dubová	Prešov
Dubovce	Trnava
Dubovec	Banská Bystrica
Dubové	Žilina
Dubové	Banská Bystrica
Dubovica	Prešov
Dúbrava	Prešov
Dúbrava	Žilina
Dúbrava	Prešov
Dúbravica	Banská Bystrica
Dúbravka	Košice
Dúbravy	Banská Bystrica
Ducové	Trnava
Dudince	Banská Bystrica
Dukovce	Prešov
Dulova Ves	Prešov
Dulovce	Nitra
Dulovo	Banská Bystrica
Dulov	Trenčín
Dunajov	Žilina
Dunajská Lužná	Bratislava
Dunajská Streda	Trnava
Dunajský Klátov	Trnava
Duplín	Prešov
Ďurčiná	Žilina
Ďurďošík	Košice
Ďurďoš	Prešov
Ďurďové	Trenčín
Ďurková	Prešov
Ďurkovce	Banská Bystrica
Ďurkov	Košice
Dvorany nad Nitrou	Nitra
Dvorec	Trenčín
Dvorianky	Košice
Dvorníky	Trnava
Dvorníky-Včeláre	Košice
Dvory nad Žitavou	Nitra
Egreš	Košice
Fačkov	Žilina
Falkušovce	Košice
Farná	Nitra
Fekišovce	Košice
Figa	Banská Bystrica
Fijaš	Prešov
Fiľakovo	Banská Bystrica
Fiľakovské Kováče	Banská Bystrica
Fintice	Prešov
Folkušová	Žilina
Forbasy	Prešov
Frička	Prešov
Fričkovce	Prešov
Fričovce	Prešov
Fulianka	Prešov
Gabčíkovo	Trnava
Gaboltov	Prešov
Gajary	Bratislava
Galanta	Trnava
Galovany	Žilina
Gánovce	Prešov
Gáň	Trnava
Gbeľany	Žilina
Gbelce	Nitra
Gbely	Trnava
Geča	Košice
Gelnica	Košice
Gemerček	Banská Bystrica
Gemerská Hôrka	Košice
Gemerská Panica	Košice
Gemerská Poloma	Košice
Gemerská Ves	Banská Bystrica
Gemerské Dechtáre	Banská Bystrica
Gemerské Michalovce	Banská Bystrica
Gemerské Teplice	Banská Bystrica
Gemerský Jablonec	Banská Bystrica
Gemerský Sad	Banská Bystrica
Gemer (village)	Banská Bystrica
Geraltov	Prešov
Gerlachov	Prešov
Gerlachov	Prešov
Giglovce	Prešov
Giraltovce	Prešov
Girovce	Prešov
Glabušovce	Banská Bystrica
Gočaltovo	Košice
Gočovo	Košice
Golianovo	Nitra
Gortva	Banská Bystrica
Gôtovany	Žilina
Granč-Petrovce	Prešov
Gregorova Vieska	Banská Bystrica
Gregorovce	Prešov
Gribov	Prešov
Gruzovce	Prešov
Gyňov	Košice
Habovka	Žilina
Habura	Prešov
Hačava	Košice
Háj	Košice
Hajnáčka	Banská Bystrica
Hajná Nová Ves	Nitra
Hájske	Nitra
Hajtovka	Prešov
Háj	Žilina
Haláčovce	Trenčín
Halič	Banská Bystrica
Haligovce	Prešov
Haluzice	Trenčín
Hamuliakovo	Bratislava
Handlová	Trenčín
Hanigovce	Prešov
Haniska	Košice
Haniska	Prešov
Hanková	Košice
Hankovce	Prešov
Hankovce	Prešov
Hanušovce nad Topľou	Prešov
Harakovce	Prešov
Harhaj	Prešov
Harichovce	Košice
Harmanec	Banská Bystrica
Hatalov	Košice
Hatné	Trenčín
Havaj	Prešov
Havka	Prešov
Havranec	Prešov
Hažín	Košice
Hažín nad Cirochou	Prešov
Hažlín	Prešov
Helcmanovce	Košice
Heľpa	Banská Bystrica
Henckovce	Košice
Henclová	Košice
Hencovce	Prešov
Hendrichovce	Prešov
Herľany	Košice
Hermanovce nad Topľou	Prešov
Hermanovce	Prešov
Hertník	Prešov
Hervartov	Prešov
Hiadeľ	Banská Bystrica
Hincovce	Košice
Hladovka	Žilina
Hlboké nad Váhom	Žilina
Hlboké	Trnava
Hliník nad Hronom	Banská Bystrica
Hlinné	Prešov
Hlivištia	Košice
Hlohovec	Trnava
Hniezdne	Prešov
Hnilčík	Košice
Hnilec (village)	Košice
Hnojné	Košice
Hnúšťa	Banská Bystrica
Hodejov	Banská Bystrica
Hodejovec	Banská Bystrica
Hodkovce	Košice
Hodruša-Hámre	Banská Bystrica
Hokovce	Nitra
Holčíkovce	Prešov
Holiare	Nitra
Holice	Trnava
Holíč	Trnava
Holiša	Banská Bystrica
Holumnica	Prešov
Honce	Košice
Hontianska Vrbica	Nitra
Hontianske Moravce	Banská Bystrica
Hontianske Nemce	Banská Bystrica
Hontianske Tesáre	Banská Bystrica
Hontianske Trsťany	Nitra
Hôrka nad Váhom	Trenčín
Hôrka	Prešov
Hôrky	Žilina
Horná Breznica	Trenčín
Horňa	Košice
Horná Kráľová	Nitra
Horná Krupá	Trnava
Horná Lehota	Banská Bystrica
Horná Lehota	Žilina
Horná Mariková	Trenčín
Horná Mičiná	Banská Bystrica
Horňany	Trenčín
Horná Poruba	Trenčín
Horná Potôň	Trnava
Horná Seč	Nitra
Horná Streda	Trenčín
Horná Strehová	Banská Bystrica
Horná Súča	Trenčín
Horná Štubňa	Žilina
Horná Ves	Trenčín
Horná Ves	Banská Bystrica
Horná Ždaňa	Banská Bystrica
Horné Dubové	Trnava
Horné Hámre	Banská Bystrica
Horné Chlebany	Nitra
Horné Lefantovce	Nitra
Horné Mladonice	Banská Bystrica
Horné Mýto	Trnava
Horné Naštice	Trenčín
Horné Obdokovce	Nitra
Horné Orešany	Trnava
Horné Otrokovce	Trnava
Horné Plachtince	Banská Bystrica
Horné Pršany	Banská Bystrica
Horné Saliby	Trnava
Horné Semerovce	Nitra
Horné Srnie	Trenčín
Horné Strháre	Banská Bystrica
Horné Štitáre	Nitra
Horné Trhovište	Trnava
Horné Turovce	Nitra
Horné Vestenice	Trenčín
Horné Zahorany	Banská Bystrica
Horné Zelenice	Trnava
Horný Badín	Banská Bystrica
Horný Bar	Trnava
Horný Hričov	Žilina
Horný Kalník	Žilina
Horný Lieskov	Trenčín
Horný Pial	Nitra
Horný Tisovník	Banská Bystrica
Horný Vadičov	Žilina
Horovce	Košice
Horovce	Trenčín
Hoste	Trnava
Hostice	Banská Bystrica
Hostie	Nitra
Hostišovce	Banská Bystrica
Hosťová	Nitra
Hosťovce	Košice
Hosťovce	Nitra
Hostovice	Prešov
Hozelec	Prešov
Hrabičov	Banská Bystrica
Hrabkov	Prešov
Hrabová Roztoka	Prešov
Hrabovčík	Prešov
Hrabovec nad Laborcom	Prešov
Hrabovec	Prešov
Hrabovka	Trenčín
Hrabské	Prešov
Hrabušice	Košice
Hradisko	Prešov
Hradište	Trenčín
Hradište pod Vrátnom	Trnava
Hradište	Banská Bystrica
Hrádok	Trenčín
Hrachovište	Trenčín
Hrachovo	Banská Bystrica
Hraničné	Prešov
Hraň	Košice
Hranovnica	Prešov
Hrašné	Trenčín
Hrašovík	Košice
Hrčeľ	Košice
Hrhov	Košice
Hriadky	Košice
Hričovské Podhradie	Žilina
Hriňová	Banská Bystrica
Hrišovce	Košice
Hrkovce	Nitra
Hrlica	Banská Bystrica
Hrnčiarovce nad Parnou	Trnava
Hrnčiarska Ves	Banská Bystrica
Hrnčiarske Zalužany	Banská Bystrica
Hrochoť	Banská Bystrica
Hromoš	Prešov
Hronec	Banská Bystrica
Hronovce	Nitra
Hronsek	Banská Bystrica
Hronská Breznica	Banská Bystrica
Hronská Dúbrava	Banská Bystrica
Hronské Kľačany	Nitra
Hronské Kosihy	Nitra
Hronský Beňadik	Banská Bystrica
Hrubá Borša	Bratislava
Hruboňovo	Nitra
Hrubov	Prešov
Hrubý Šúr	Bratislava
Hrušovany	Nitra
Hrušovo	Banská Bystrica
Hrušov	Košice
Hrušov	Banská Bystrica
Hruštín	Žilina
Hubice	Trnava
Hubina	Trnava
Hubošovce	Prešov
Hubová	Žilina
Hubovo	Banská Bystrica
Hucín	Banská Bystrica
Hudcovce	Prešov
Hul	Nitra
Humenné	Prešov
Huncovce	Prešov
Hunkovce	Prešov
Hurbanova Ves	Bratislava
Hurbanovo	Nitra
Husák (village)	Košice
Husiná	Banská Bystrica
Hutka	Prešov
Huty	Žilina
Hviezdoslavov	Trnava
Hvozdnica	Žilina
Hybe	Žilina
Hýľov	Košice
Chanava	Banská Bystrica
Chľaba	Nitra
Chlebnice	Žilina
Chlmec	Prešov
Chmeľnica	Prešov
Chmeľová	Prešov
Chmeľovec	Prešov
Chmeľov	Prešov
Chmiňany	Prešov
Chminianska Nová Ves	Prešov
Chminianske Jakubovany	Prešov
Choča	Nitra
Chocholná-Velčice	Trenčín
Choňkovce	Košice
Chorvátsky Grob	Bratislava
Chorváty	Košice
Chotča	Prešov
Chotín	Nitra
Chrabrany	Nitra
Chrámec	Banská Bystrica
Chrastince	Banská Bystrica
Chrasť nad Hornádom	Košice
Chrastné	Košice
Chrenovec-Brusno	Trenčín
Chropov	Trnava
Chrťany	Banská Bystrica
Chtelnica	Trnava
Chudá Lehota	Trenčín
Chvalová	Banská Bystrica
Chvojnica	Trenčín
Chvojnica	Trenčín
Chynorany	Trenčín
Chyžné	Banská Bystrica
Igram	Bratislava
Ihľany	Prešov
Ihráč	Banská Bystrica
Ilava	Trenčín
Iliašovce	Košice
Ilija	Banská Bystrica
Imeľ	Nitra
Iňačovce	Košice
Iňa	Nitra
Inovce	Košice
Ipeľské Predmostie	Banská Bystrica
Ipeľské Úľany	Nitra
Ipeľský Sokolec	Nitra
Istebné	Žilina
Ivachnová	Žilina
Ivančiná	Žilina
Ivanice	Banská Bystrica
Ivanka pri Dunaji	Bratislava
Ivanka pri Nitre	Nitra
Ivanovce	Trenčín
Iža	Nitra
Ižipovce	Žilina
Ižkovce	Košice
Jablonec	Bratislava
Jablonica	Trnava
Jablonka	Trenčín
Jabloňovce	Nitra
Jablonové	Žilina
Jablonové	Bratislava
Jablonov nad Turňou	Košice
Jablonov	Prešov
Jabloň	Prešov
Jacovce	Nitra
Jahodná	Trnava
Jaklovce	Košice
Jakovany	Prešov
Jakubany	Prešov
Jakubovany	Žilina
Jakubovany	Prešov
Jakubova Voľa	Prešov
Jakubov	Bratislava
Jakušovce	Prešov
Jalová	Prešov
Jalovec	Žilina
Jalovec	Trenčín
Jalšové	Trnava
Jalšovík	Banská Bystrica
Jamník	Žilina
Jamník	Košice
Janice	Banská Bystrica
Janík	Košice
Janíky	Trnava
Jankovce	Prešov
Janova Lehota	Banská Bystrica
Janovce	Prešov
Jánovce	Trnava
Jánovce	Prešov
Janovík	Prešov
Janov	Prešov
Jarabá	Banská Bystrica
Jarabina	Prešov
Jarok	Nitra
Jarovnice	Prešov
Jasenica (village)	Trenčín
Jasenie	Banská Bystrica
Jasenová	Žilina
Jasenovce	Prešov
Jasenové	Žilina
Jasenov	Prešov
Jasenovo	Žilina
Jasenov	Košice
Jaslovské Bohunice	Trnava
Jasová	Nitra
Jasov	Košice
Jastrabá	Banská Bystrica
Jastrabie nad Topľou	Prešov
Jastrabie pri Michalovciach	Košice
Jatov	Nitra
Jazernica	Žilina
Jedlinka	Prešov
Jedľové Kostoľany	Nitra
Jelenec	Nitra
Jelka	Trnava
Jelšava	Banská Bystrica
Jelšovce	Nitra
Jelšovec	Banská Bystrica
Jenkovce	Košice
Jesenské	Nitra
Jesenské	Banská Bystrica
Jestice	Banská Bystrica
Ješkova Ves	Trenčín
Jezersko	Prešov
Jovice	Košice
Jovsa	Košice
Jurkova Voľa	Prešov
Jur nad Hronom	Nitra
Jurová	Trnava
Jurské	Prešov
Juskova Voľa	Prešov
Kačanov	Košice
Kajal (village)	Trnava
Kaľamenová	Žilina
Kalameny	Žilina
Kaľava	Košice
Kalinkovo	Bratislava
Kalinov	Prešov
Kalinovo	Banská Bystrica
Kalná nad Hronom	Nitra
Kalná Roztoka	Prešov
Kálnica	Trenčín
Kalnište	Prešov
Kalonda	Banská Bystrica
Kaloša	Banská Bystrica
Kalša	Košice
Kaluža	Košice
Kamanová	Nitra
Kameňany	Banská Bystrica
Kamenec pod Vtáčnikom	Trenčín
Kamenica nad Cirochou	Prešov
Kamenica nad Hronom	Nitra
Kamenica	Prešov
Kameničany	Trenčín
Kameničná	Nitra
Kamenín	Nitra
Kamenná Poruba	Prešov
Kamenná Poruba	Žilina
Kamenné Kosihy	Banská Bystrica
Kamenný Most (Nové Zámky District)	Nitra
Kamienka	Prešov
Kamienka	Prešov
Kanianka	Trenčín
Kapince	Nitra
Kapišová	Prešov
Kaplna	Bratislava
Kapušany	Prešov
Kapušianske Kľačany	Košice
Karlová	Žilina
Karná	Prešov
Kašov	Košice
Kátlovce	Trnava
Kátov	Trnava
Kazimír	Košice
Kecerovce	Košice
Kecerovský Lipovec	Košice
Kečkovce	Prešov
Kečovo	Košice
Kechnec	Košice
Kendice	Prešov
Kesovce	Banská Bystrica
Keť	Nitra
Kežmarok	Prešov
Kiarov	Banská Bystrica
Kľačany	Trnava
Kľače	Žilina
Kľačno	Trenčín
Kladzany	Prešov
Kľak	Banská Bystrica
Klasov	Nitra
Kláštor pod Znievom	Žilina
Klátova Nová Ves	Trenčín
Klčov	Prešov
Kleňany	Banská Bystrica
Klenová (Snina District)	Prešov
Klenovec	Banská Bystrica
Klenov	Prešov
Klieština	Trenčín
Klin nad Bodrogom	Košice
Klin	Žilina
Klížska Nemá	Nitra
Klokočov	Žilina
Klokočov	Košice
Klokoč	Banská Bystrica
Klubina	Žilina
Kľúčovec	Trnava
Kluknava	Košice
Kľušov	Prešov
Kmeťovo	Nitra
Kobeliarovo	Košice
Kobylnice (Svidník District)	Prešov
Kobyly	Prešov
Koceľovce	Košice
Kociha	Banská Bystrica
Kocurany	Trenčín
Kočín-Lančár	Trnava
Kočovce	Trenčín
Kochanovce	Prešov
Kochanovce	Prešov
Kojatice	Prešov
Kojšov	Košice
Kokava nad Rimavicou	Banská Bystrica
Kokošovce	Prešov
Kokšov-Bakša	Košice
Kolačkov	Prešov
Kolačno	Trenčín
Koláre	Banská Bystrica
Kolárovice	Žilina
Kolárovo	Nitra
Kolbasov	Prešov
Kolbovce	Prešov
Kolibabovce	Košice
Kolíňany	Nitra
Kolinovce	Košice
Kolonica	Prešov
Kolta	Nitra
Komárany	Prešov
Komárno	Nitra
Komárov	Prešov
Komárovce	Košice
Komjatice	Nitra
Komjatná	Žilina
Komoča	Nitra
Koniarovce	Nitra
Konrádovce	Banská Bystrica
Konská	Žilina
Konská	Žilina
Koňuš	Košice
Kopčany	Trnava
Kopernica	Banská Bystrica
Koplotovce	Trnava
Koprivnica	Prešov
Kordíky	Banská Bystrica
Korejovce	Prešov
Korňa	Žilina
Koromľa	Košice
Korunková	Prešov
Korytárky	Banská Bystrica
Korytné	Prešov
Kosihovce	Banská Bystrica
Kosihy nad Ipľom	Banská Bystrica
Kosorín	Banská Bystrica
Kostoľany nad Hornádom	Košice
Kostoľany pod Tribečom	Nitra
Kostolec	Trenčín
Kostolište	Bratislava
Kostolná pri Dunaji	Bratislava
Kostolná Ves	Trenčín
Kostolná-Záriečie	Trenčín
Kostolné Kračany	Trnava
Kostolné	Trenčín
Košariská	Trenčín
Košarovce	Prešov
Košeca	Trenčín
Košecké Podhradie	Trenčín
Košická Belá	Košice
Košická Polianka	Košice
Košické Oľšany	Košice
Košický Klečenov	Košice
Koškovce	Prešov
Košolná	Trnava
Košťany nad Turcom	Žilina
Koš	Trenčín
Košúty	Trnava
Kotešová	Žilina
Kotmanová	Banská Bystrica
Kotrčiná Lúčka	Žilina
Kováčová	Košice
Kováčová	Banská Bystrica
Kováčovce	Banská Bystrica
Koválovec	Trnava
Koválov	Trnava
Kovarce	Nitra
Kozárovce	Nitra
Kozelník	Banská Bystrica
Kozí Vrbovok	Banská Bystrica
Kožany	Prešov
Kožuchovce	Prešov
Kožuchov	Košice
Kračúnovce	Prešov
Krahule	Banská Bystrica
Krajná Bystrá	Prešov
Krajná Poľana	Prešov
Krajná Porúbka	Prešov
Krajné Čierno	Prešov
Krajné	Trenčín
Krakovany	Trnava
Kráľ	Banská Bystrica
Králiky	Banská Bystrica
Kráľova Lehota	Žilina
Kráľová nad Váhom	Nitra
Kraľovany	Žilina
Kráľová pri Senci	Bratislava
Kráľov Brod	Trnava
Kráľovce	Košice
Kráľovce-Krnišov	Banská Bystrica
Kráľovičove Kračany	Trnava
Kráľovský Chlmec	Košice
Kraskovo	Banská Bystrica
Krásna Lúka	Prešov
Krasňany	Žilina
Krásna Ves	Trenčín
Krásnohorská Dlhá Lúka	Košice
Krásnohorské Podhradie	Košice
Krásno nad Kysucou	Žilina
Krásno	Trenčín
Krásnovce	Košice
Krásny Brod	Prešov
Kravany nad Dunajom	Nitra
Kravany	Prešov
Kravany	Košice
Krčava	Košice
Kremná	Prešov
Kremnica	Banská Bystrica
Kremnické Bane	Banská Bystrica
Kristy (village)	Košice
Krišlovce	Prešov
Krišovská Liesková	Košice
Kriváň (village)	Banská Bystrica
Krivany	Prešov
Krivá	Žilina
Krivé	Prešov
Krivoklát	Trenčín
Krivosúd-Bodovka	Trenčín
Kríže	Prešov
Križovany nad Dudváhom	Trnava
Krížovany	Prešov
Krížová Ves	Prešov
Krná	Banská Bystrica
Krnča	Nitra
Krokava	Banská Bystrica
Krompachy	Košice
Krpeľany	Žilina
Krškany	Nitra
Krtovce	Nitra
Kručov	Prešov
Krupina	Banská Bystrica
Krušetnica	Žilina
Krušinec	Prešov
Krušovce	Nitra
Kružlová	Prešov
Kružlov	Prešov
Kružná	Košice
Kružno	Banská Bystrica
Kšinná	Trenčín
Kubáňovo	Nitra
Kučín	Prešov
Kučín	Prešov
Kuchyňa	Bratislava
Kuklov	Trnava
Kuková	Prešov
Kukučínov	Nitra
Kunerad	Žilina
Kunešov	Banská Bystrica
Kunova Teplica	Košice
Kuraľany	Nitra
Kurimany	Prešov
Kurima	Prešov
Kurimka	Prešov
Kurov	Prešov
Kusín	Košice
Kútniky	Trnava
Kúty	Trnava
Kuzmice	Nitra
Kuzmice	Košice
Kvačany	Žilina
Kvačany	Prešov
Kvakovce	Prešov
Kvašov	Trenčín
Kvetoslavov	Trnava
Kyjatice	Banská Bystrica
Kyjov	Prešov
Kynceľová	Banská Bystrica
Kysak	Košice
Kyselica	Trnava
Kysta	Košice
Kysucké Nové Mesto	Žilina
Kysucký Lieskovec	Žilina
Láb	Bratislava
Lacková	Prešov
Lackov	Banská Bystrica
Lackovce	Prešov
Lada	Prešov
Ladce	Trenčín
Ladice	Nitra
Ladmovce	Košice
Ladomerská Vieska	Banská Bystrica
Ladomirová	Prešov
Ladomirov	Prešov
Ladzany	Banská Bystrica
Lakšárska Nová Ves	Trnava
Lascov	Prešov
Laskár	Žilina
Lastomír	Košice
Lastovce	Košice
Laškovce	Košice
Látky	Banská Bystrica
Lazany	Trenčín
Lazisko	Žilina
Lazy pod Makytou	Trenčín
Lažany	Prešov
Lednica	Trenčín
Lednické Rovne	Trenčín
Legnava	Prešov
Lehnice	Trnava
Lehota nad Rimavicou	Banská Bystrica
Lehota	Nitra
Lehota pod Vtáčnikom	Trenčín
Lehôtka	Banská Bystrica
Lehôtka pod Brehmi	Banská Bystrica
Lechnica	Prešov
Lekárovce	Košice
Leľa	Nitra
Leles	Košice
Lemešany	Prešov
Lenartovce	Banská Bystrica
Lenartov	Prešov
Lendak	Prešov
Lenka	Banská Bystrica
Lentvora	Banská Bystrica
Leopoldov	Trnava
Lesenice	Banská Bystrica
Lesíček	Prešov
Lesné	Košice
Lesnica (Slovakia)	Prešov
Lešť	Banská Bystrica
Leštiny	Žilina
Letanovce	Košice
Letničie	Trnava
Leváre	Banská Bystrica
Levice	Nitra
Levkuška	Banská Bystrica
Levoča	Prešov
Ležiachov	Žilina
Libichava	Trenčín
Licince	Banská Bystrica
Ličartovce	Prešov
Liesek	Žilina
Lieskovany	Košice
Lieskovec	Prešov
Lieskovec	Banská Bystrica
Liešno	Žilina
Liešťany	Trenčín
Lietava	Žilina
Lietavská Lúčka	Žilina
Lietavská Svinná-Babkov	Žilina
Likavka	Žilina
Limbach	Bratislava
Lipany	Prešov
Lipník	Trenčín
Lipníky	Prešov
Lipová	Prešov
Lipová	Nitra
Lipovany	Banská Bystrica
Lipovce	Prešov
Lipovec	Žilina
Lipovec	Banská Bystrica
Lipové	Nitra
Lipovník	Košice
Lipovník	Nitra
Liptovská Anna	Žilina
Liptovská Kokava	Žilina
Liptovská Lúžna	Žilina
Liptovská Osada	Žilina
Liptovská Porúbka	Žilina
Liptovská Sielnica	Žilina
Liptovská Štiavnica	Žilina
Liptovská Teplá	Žilina
Liptovská Teplička	Prešov
Liptovské Beharovce	Žilina
Liptovské Kľačany	Žilina
Liptovské Matiašovce	Žilina
Liptovské Revúce	Žilina
Liptovské Sliače	Žilina
Liptovský Hrádok	Žilina
Liptovský Ján	Žilina
Liptovský Michal	Žilina
Liptovský Mikuláš	Žilina
Liptovský Ondrej	Žilina
Liptovský Peter	Žilina
Liptovský Trnovec	Žilina
Lisková	Žilina
Lišov	Banská Bystrica
Litava	Banská Bystrica
Litmanová	Prešov
Livina	Trenčín
Livinské Opatovce	Trenčín
Livov	Prešov
Livovská Huta	Prešov
Lodno	Žilina
Lokca	Žilina
Lok	Nitra
Lom nad Rimavicou	Banská Bystrica
Lomná	Žilina
Lomné	Prešov
Lomnička (Stará Ľubovňa District)	Prešov
Lontov	Nitra
Lopašov	Trnava
Lopúchov	Prešov
Lopušné Pažite	Žilina
Lošonec	Trnava
Lovce	Nitra
Lovča	Banská Bystrica
Lovčica-Trubín	Banská Bystrica
Lovinobaňa	Banská Bystrica
Lozorno	Bratislava
Ložín	Košice
Ľubá	Nitra
Ľubeľa	Žilina
Lubeník	Banská Bystrica
Ľubica	Prešov
Ľubietová	Banská Bystrica
Lubina	Trenčín
Ľubiša	Prešov
Ľubochňa	Žilina
Ľuboreč	Banská Bystrica
Ľuboriečka	Banská Bystrica
Ľubotice	Prešov
Ľubotín	Prešov
Ľubovec	Prešov
Lučatín	Banská Bystrica
Lučenec	Banská Bystrica
Lúčina	Prešov
Lučivná	Prešov
Lúčka	Prešov
Lúčka	Košice
Lúčka	Prešov
Lúčka	Prešov
Lúčky	Košice
Lúčky	Žilina
Lúčky	Banská Bystrica
Lúč na Ostrove	Trnava
Lúčnica nad Žitavou	Nitra
Ludanice	Nitra
Ľudovítová	Nitra
Ludrová	Žilina
Luhyňa	Košice
Lukáčovce	Nitra
Lukačovce	Prešov
Lúka	Trenčín
Lukavica	Prešov
Lukavica	Banská Bystrica
Lukov (Bardejov District)	Prešov
Lukovištia	Banská Bystrica
Lúky	Trenčín
Lula	Nitra
Lupoč	Banská Bystrica
Lutila	Banská Bystrica
Ľutina	Prešov
Lutiše	Žilina
Ľutov	Trenčín
Lužany pri Topli	Prešov
Lužany (Topoľčany)	Nitra
Lužianky	Nitra
Lysá pod Makytou	Trenčín
Lysica	Žilina
Macov	Trnava
Mad	Trnava
Madunice	Trnava
Magnezitovce	Banská Bystrica
Machulince	Nitra
Majcichov	Trnava
Majere	Prešov
Majerovce	Prešov
Makovce	Prešov
Makov	Žilina
Malacky	Bratislava
Malá Čalomija	Banská Bystrica
Malá Čausa	Trenčín
Malá Čierna	Žilina
Malá Domaša	Prešov
Malá Franková	Prešov
Malá Hradná	Trenčín
Malachov	Banská Bystrica
Malá Ida	Košice
Malá Lehota	Banská Bystrica
Malá Lodina	Košice
Malá Mača	Trnava
Malá nad Hronom	Nitra
Malá Poľana	Prešov
Málaš	Nitra
Malatiná	Žilina
Malatíny	Žilina
Malá Tŕňa	Košice
Malcov	Prešov
Malčice	Košice
Malé Borové	Žilina
Malé Dvorníky	Trnava
Malé Hoste	Trenčín
Malé Chyndice	Nitra
Malé Kosihy	Nitra
Malé Kozmálovce	Nitra
Malé Kršteňany	Trenčín
Malé Lednice	Trenčín
Malé Leváre	Bratislava
Malé Ludince	Nitra
Malé Ozorovce	Košice
Malé Raškovce	Košice
Malé Ripňany	Nitra
Malé Straciny	Banská Bystrica
Malé Trakany	Košice
Malé Uherce	Trenčín
Malé Vozokany	Nitra
Malé Zálužie	Nitra
Malé Zlievce	Banská Bystrica
Málinec	Banská Bystrica
Malinová	Trenčín
Malinovo	Bratislava
Malužiná	Žilina
Malý Cetín	Nitra
Malý Čepčín	Žilina
Malý Horeš	Košice
Malý Kamenec	Košice
Malý Krtíš	Banská Bystrica
Malý Lapáš	Nitra
Malý Lipník	Prešov
Malý Slavkov	Prešov
Malý Slivník	Prešov
Malý Šariš	Prešov
Malženice	Trnava
Maňa	Nitra
Mankovce	Nitra
Marcelová	Nitra
Margecany	Košice
Marhaň	Prešov
Marianka	Bratislava
Markovce	Košice
Markuška	Košice
Markušovce	Košice
Maršová-Rašov	Žilina
Martinček	Žilina
Martin nad Žitavou	Nitra
Martinová	Banská Bystrica
Martin	Žilina
Martovce	Nitra
Mašková	Banská Bystrica
Maškovce	Prešov
Matejovce nad Hornádom	Košice
Matiaška	Prešov
Matiašovce	Prešov
Matovce	Prešov
Maťovské Vojkovce	Košice
Matúškovo	Trnava
Matysová	Prešov
Medovarce	Banská Bystrica
Medvedie	Prešov
Medveďov	Trnava
Medzany	Prešov
Medzev	Košice
Medzianky	Prešov
Medzibrod	Banská Bystrica
Medzibrodie nad Oravou	Žilina
Medzilaborce	Prešov
Melčice-Lieskové	Trenčín
Melek	Nitra
Meliata	Košice
Mengusovce	Prešov
Merašice	Trnava
Merník	Prešov
Mestečko	Trenčín
Mestisko	Prešov
Mičakovce	Prešov
Mierovo	Trnava
Miezgovce	Trenčín
Michajlov	Prešov
Michaľany	Košice
Michalková	Banská Bystrica
Michal nad Žitavou	Nitra
Michal na Ostrove	Trnava
Michalok	Prešov
Michalová	Banská Bystrica
Michalovce	Košice
Miklušovce	Prešov
Miková	Prešov
Mikulášová	Prešov
Mikušovce	Trenčín
Mikušovce	Banská Bystrica
Milhosť	Košice
Miloslavov	Bratislava
Milpoš	Prešov
Miňovce	Prešov
Mirkovce	Prešov
Miroľa	Prešov
Mládzovo	Banská Bystrica
Mlynárovce	Prešov
Mlynčeky	Prešov
Mlynica	Prešov
Mlynky	Košice
Mníchova Lehota	Trenčín
Mníšek nad Hnilcom	Košice
Mníšek nad Popradom	Prešov
Moča	Nitra
Močenok	Nitra
Močiar	Banská Bystrica
Modra	Bratislava
Modra nad Cirochou	Prešov
Modrany	Nitra
Modrová	Trenčín
Modrovka	Trenčín
Modrý Kameň	Banská Bystrica
Mojmírovce	Nitra
Mojš	Žilina
Mojtín	Trenčín
Mojzesovo	Nitra
Mokrá Lúka	Banská Bystrica
Mokrance	Košice
Mokroluh	Prešov
Mokrý Háj	Trnava
Môlča	Banská Bystrica
Moldava nad Bodvou	Košice
Moravany	Košice
Moravany nad Váhom	Trnava
Moravské Lieskové	Trenčín
Moravský Svätý Ján	Trnava
Mostová	Trnava
Most pri Bratislave	Bratislava
Moškovec	Žilina
Mošovce	Žilina
Moštenica	Banská Bystrica
Mošurov	Prešov
Motešice	Trenčín
Motyčky	Banská Bystrica
Mrázovce	Prešov
Mučín	Banská Bystrica
Mudroňovo	Nitra
Mudrovce	Košice
Muľa	Banská Bystrica
Muráň	Banská Bystrica
Muránska Dlhá Lúka	Banská Bystrica
Muránska Huta	Banská Bystrica
Muránska Lehota	Banská Bystrica
Muránska Zdychava	Banská Bystrica
Mútne	Žilina
Mužla	Nitra
Myjava	Trenčín
Myslina	Prešov
Mýtna	Banská Bystrica
Mýtne Ludany	Nitra
Mýto pod Ďumbierom	Banská Bystrica
Nacina Ves	Košice
Nadlice	Trenčín
Ňagov	Prešov
Naháč	Trnava
Nálepkovo	Košice
Námestovo	Žilina
Nána	Nitra
Nandraž	Banská Bystrica
Ňárad	Trnava
Necpaly	Žilina
Nedanovce	Trenčín
Nedašovce	Trenčín
Neded	Nitra
Nededza	Žilina
Nedožery-Brezany	Trenčín
Nechválova Polianka	Prešov
Nemce	Banská Bystrica
Nemcovce	Prešov
Nemcovce	Prešov
Nemčice	Nitra
Nemčiňany	Nitra
Nemecká	Banská Bystrica
Nemečky	Nitra
Nemešany	Prešov
Nemšová	Trenčín
Nenince	Banská Bystrica
Neporadza	Banská Bystrica
Neporadza	Trenčín
Nesluša	Žilina
Nesvady	Nitra
Neverice	Nitra
Nevidzany	Trenčín
Nevidzany	Nitra
Nevoľné	Banská Bystrica
Nezbudská Lúčka	Žilina
Nimnica	Trenčín
Nitra nad Ipľom	Banská Bystrica
Nitra	Nitra
Nitrianska Blatnica	Nitra
Nitrianska Streda	Nitra
Nitrianske Hrnčiarovce	Nitra
Nitrianske Pravno	Trenčín
Nitrianske Rudno	Trenčín
Nitrianske Sučany	Trenčín
Nitrica	Trenčín
Nižná Boca	Žilina
Nižná Hutka	Košice
Nižná Jablonka	Prešov
Nižná Jedľová	Prešov
Nižná Kamenica	Košice
Nižná Myšľa	Košice
Nižná Olšava	Prešov
Nižná	Trnava
Nižná Pisaná	Prešov
Nižná Polianka	Prešov
Nižná Rybnica	Košice
Nižná Sitnica	Prešov
Nižná Slaná	Košice
Nižná	Žilina
Nižná Voľa	Prešov
Nižné Ladičkovce	Prešov
Nižné Nemecké	Košice
Nižné Repaše	Prešov
Nižné Ružbachy	Prešov
Nižný Čaj	Košice
Nižný Hrabovec	Prešov
Nižný Hrušov	Prešov
Nižný Klátov	Košice
Nižný Komárnik	Prešov
Nižný Kručov	Prešov
Nižný Lánec	Košice
Nižný Mirošov	Prešov
Nižný Orlík	Prešov
Nižný Skálnik	Banská Bystrica
Nižný Slavkov	Prešov
Nižný Tvarožec	Prešov
Nižný Žipov	Košice
Nolčovo	Žilina
Norovce	Nitra
Nová Baňa	Banská Bystrica
Nová Bašta	Banská Bystrica
Nová Bošáca	Trenčín
Nová Bystrica	Žilina
Nováčany	Košice
Nová Dedina	Nitra
Nová Dedinka	Bratislava
Nová Dubnica	Trenčín
Nová Kelča	Prešov
Nováky	Trenčín
Nová Lehota	Trenčín
Nová Lesná	Prešov
Nová Ľubovňa	Prešov
Nová Polhora	Košice
Nová Polianka	Prešov
Nová Sedlica	Prešov
Nová Ves nad Váhom	Trenčín
Nová Ves nad Žitavou	Nitra
Nová Ves	Banská Bystrica
Nová Vieska	Nitra
Nové Hony	Banská Bystrica
Nové Mesto nad Váhom	Trenčín
Nové Sady	Nitra
Nové Zámky	Nitra
Novosad	Košice
Novoť	Žilina
Nový Ruskov	Košice
Nový Salaš	Košice
Nový Svet	Bratislava
Nový Tekov	Nitra
Nový Život	Trnava
Nýrovce	Nitra
Obeckov	Banská Bystrica
Obid	Nitra
Obišovce	Košice
Oborín	Košice
Obručné	Prešov
Obyce	Nitra
Očkov	Trenčín
Očová	Banská Bystrica
Odorín	Košice
Ohrady	Trnava
Ohradzany	Prešov
Ochodnica	Žilina
Ochtiná	Košice
Okoč	Trnava
Okoličná na Ostrove	Nitra
Okrúhle	Prešov
Okružná	Prešov
Olcnava	Košice
Oľdza	Trnava
Olejníkov	Prešov
Olešná	Žilina
Oľka	Prešov
Olováry	Banská Bystrica
Oľšavce	Prešov
Oľšavica	Prešov
Oľšavka	Košice
Oľšavka	Prešov
Oľšinkov	Prešov
Olšovany	Košice
Oľšov	Prešov
Omastiná	Trenčín
Omšenie	Trenčín
Ondavka	Prešov
Ondavské Matiašovce	Prešov
Ondrašová	Žilina
Ondrašovce	Prešov
Ondrejovce	Nitra
Opátka	Košice
Opatovce nad Nitrou	Trenčín
Opatovce	Trenčín
Opatovská Nová Ves	Banská Bystrica
Opava	Banská Bystrica
Opiná	Košice
Opoj	Trnava
Oponice	Nitra
Oravce	Banská Bystrica
Orávka	Banská Bystrica
Oravská Jasenica	Žilina
Oravská Lesná	Žilina
Oravská Polhora	Žilina
Oravská Poruba	Žilina
Oravské Veselé	Žilina
Oravský Biely Potok	Žilina
Oravský Podzámok	Žilina
Ordzovany	Prešov
Orechová	Košice
Orechová Potôň	Trnava
Oreské	Košice
Oreské	Trnava
Orešany	Nitra
Orlov	Prešov
Orovnica	Banská Bystrica
Ortuťová	Prešov
Osádka	Žilina
Osadné	Prešov
Osikov	Prešov
Oslany	Trenčín
Osrblie	Banská Bystrica
Ostrá Lúka	Banská Bystrica
Ostratice	Trenčín
Ostrovany	Prešov
Ostrov	Trnava
Ostrov	Košice
Ostrý Grúň	Banská Bystrica
Osturňa	Prešov
Osuské	Trnava
Oščadnica	Žilina
Otrhánky	Trenčín
Otročok	Banská Bystrica
Ovčiarsko	Žilina
Ovčie	Prešov
Ozdín	Banská Bystrica
Ožďany	Banská Bystrica
Pača	Košice
Padáň	Trnava
Padarovce	Banská Bystrica
Pakostov	Prešov
Palárikovo	Nitra
Palín	Košice
Palota	Prešov
Paňa	Nitra
Panické Dravce	Banská Bystrica
Paňovce	Košice
Papín	Prešov
Papradno	Trenčín
Parchovany	Košice
Parihuzovce	Prešov
Párnica	Žilina
Partizánska Ľupča	Žilina
Partizánske	Trenčín
Pastovce	Nitra
Pastuchov	Trnava
Pašková	Košice
Paština Závada	Žilina
Pata	Trnava
Pataš	Trnava
Patince	Nitra
Pavčina Lehota	Žilina
Pavľany	Prešov
Pavlice	Trnava
Pavlová	Nitra
Pavlova Ves	Žilina
Pavlovce nad Uhom	Košice
Pavlovce	Banská Bystrica
Pavlovce (Vranov nad Topľou District)	Prešov
Pažiť	Trenčín
Pčoliné	Prešov
Pečeňady	Trnava
Pečeňany	Trenčín
Pečenice	Nitra
Pečovská Nová Ves	Prešov
Peder	Košice
Perín-Chym	Košice
Pernek	Bratislava
Petkovce	Prešov
Petrikovce	Košice
Petrova Lehota	Trenčín
Petrovany	Prešov
Petrová	Prešov
Petrova Ves	Trnava
Petrovce nad Laborcom	Košice
Petrovce	Banská Bystrica
Petrovce	Košice
Petrovce	Prešov
Petrovice	Žilina
Petrovo	Košice
Pezinok	Bratislava
Piešťany	Trnava
Pichne	Prešov
Píla	Banská Bystrica
Píla	Bratislava
Píla	Banská Bystrica
Pinciná	Banská Bystrica
Pinkovce	Košice
Piskorovce	Prešov
Pitelová	Banská Bystrica
Plášťovce	Nitra
Plavecké Podhradie	Bratislava
Plavecký Mikuláš	Bratislava
Plavecký Peter	Trnava
Plavecký Štvrtok	Bratislava
Plaveč	Prešov
Plavé Vozokany	Nitra
Plavnica	Prešov
Plechotice	Košice
Plešivec	Košice
Pleš	Banská Bystrica
Plevník-Drienové	Trenčín
Pliešovce	Banská Bystrica
Ploské	Košice
Ploské	Banská Bystrica
Pobedim	Trenčín
Počarová	Trenčín
Počúvadlo	Banská Bystrica
Podbiel	Žilina
Podbranč	Trnava
Podbrezová	Banská Bystrica
Podhájska	Nitra
Podhorany	Prešov
Podhorany	Nitra
Podhorany	Prešov
Podhorie	Banská Bystrica
Podhorie	Žilina
Podhoroď	Košice
Podhradie	Žilina
Podhradie	Trenčín
Podhradie	Nitra
Podhradík	Prešov
Podkonice	Banská Bystrica
Podkriváň	Banská Bystrica
Podkylava	Trenčín
Podlužany	Trenčín
Podlužany	Nitra
Podolie	Trenčín
Podolínec	Prešov
Podrečany	Banská Bystrica
Podskalie	Trenčín
Podtureň	Žilina
Podvysoká	Žilina
Podzámčok	Banská Bystrica
Pohorelá	Banská Bystrica
Pohranice	Nitra
Pohronská Polhora	Banská Bystrica
Pohronský Bukovec	Banská Bystrica
Pohronský Ruskov	Nitra
Pochabany	Trenčín
Pokryváč	Žilina
Poľanovce	Prešov
Poľany	Košice
Poliakovce	Prešov
Polianka	Trenčín
Polichno	Banská Bystrica
Polina	Banská Bystrica
Poľný Kesov	Nitra
Poloma	Prešov
Polomka	Banská Bystrica
Poltár	Banská Bystrica
Poluvsie	Trenčín
Pongrácovce	Prešov
Poniky	Banská Bystrica
Poprad	Prešov
Poproč	Košice
Poproč	Banská Bystrica
Popudinské Močidľany	Trnava
Poráč	Košice
Poriadie	Trenčín
Porostov	Košice
Poruba pod Vihorlatom	Košice
Poruba	Trenčín
Porúbka	Prešov
Porúbka	Prešov
Porúbka	Košice
Porúbka	Žilina
Poša	Prešov
Potôčky	Prešov
Potok	Banská Bystrica
Potok	Žilina
Potoky	Prešov
Potônske Lúky	Trnava
Pôtor	Banská Bystrica
Potvorice	Trenčín
Považany	Trenčín
Považská Bystrica	Trenčín
Povina	Žilina
Povoda	Trnava
Povrazník	Banská Bystrica
Pozba	Nitra
Pozdišovce	Košice
Praha	Banská Bystrica
Prakovce	Košice
Prašice	Nitra
Prašník	Trnava
Pravenec	Trenčín
Pravica	Banská Bystrica
Pravotice	Trenčín
Práznovce	Nitra
Prečín	Trenčín
Predajná	Banská Bystrica
Predmier	Žilina
Prenčov	Banská Bystrica
Preseľany	Nitra
Prestavlky	Banská Bystrica
Prešov	Prešov
Príbelce	Banská Bystrica
Pribeník	Košice
Pribeta	Nitra
Pribiš	Žilina
Príbovce	Žilina
Pribylina	Žilina
Priechod	Banská Bystrica
Priekopa	Košice
Priepasné	Trenčín
Prietržka	Trnava
Prietrž	Trnava
Prievaly	Trnava
Prievidza	Trenčín
Prihradzany	Banská Bystrica
Príkra	Prešov
Príslop	Prešov
Prituľany	Prešov
Proč	Prešov
Prochot	Banská Bystrica
Prosačov	Prešov
Prosiek	Žilina
Prša	Banská Bystrica
Pruské	Trenčín
Prusy	Trenčín
Pružina	Trenčín
Pstriná	Prešov
Ptičie	Prešov
Ptrukša	Košice
Pucov	Žilina
Púchov	Trenčín
Pukanec	Nitra
Pusté Čemerné	Košice
Pusté Pole	Prešov
Pusté Sady	Trnava
Pusté Úľany	Trnava
Pušovce	Prešov
Rabča	Žilina
Rabčice	Žilina
Radatice	Prešov
Radava	Nitra
Radimov	Trnava
Radnovce	Banská Bystrica
Radobica	Trenčín
Radoľa	Žilina
Radoma	Prešov
Radôstka	Žilina
Radošina	Nitra
Radošovce	Trnava
Radošovce	Trnava
Radvaň nad Dunajom	Nitra
Radvaň nad Laborcom	Prešov
Radvanovce	Prešov
Rad (village)	Košice
Radzovce	Banská Bystrica
Rafajovce	Prešov
Rajčany	Nitra
Rajecká Lesná	Žilina
Rajecké Teplice	Žilina
Rajec	Žilina
Rákoš	Košice
Rákoš	Banská Bystrica
Raková	Žilina
Rakovčík	Prešov
Rakovec nad Ondavou	Košice
Rakovice	Trnava
Rakovnica	Košice
Rakovo	Žilina
Rakša	Žilina
Rakúsy	Prešov
Rakytník	Banská Bystrica
Rankovce	Košice
Rapovce	Banská Bystrica
Raslavice	Prešov
Rastislavice	Nitra
Rašice	Banská Bystrica
Ratka	Banská Bystrica
Ratková	Banská Bystrica
Ratkovce	Trnava
Ratkovo	Žilina
Ratkovská Lehota	Banská Bystrica
Ratkovská Suchá	Banská Bystrica
Ratkovské Bystré	Banská Bystrica
Ratnovce	Trnava
Ratvaj	Prešov
Ráztočno	Trenčín
Ráztoka	Banská Bystrica
Ražňany	Prešov
Reca	Bratislava
Regetovka	Prešov
Rejdová	Košice
Reľov	Prešov
Remeniny	Prešov
Remetské Hámre	Košice
Renčišov	Prešov
Repejov	Prešov
Repište	Banská Bystrica
Rešica	Košice
Rešov	Prešov
Revúca	Banská Bystrica
Revúcka Lehota	Banská Bystrica
Riečka	Banská Bystrica
Riečka	Banská Bystrica
Richnava	Košice
Richvald	Prešov
Rimavská Baňa	Banská Bystrica
Rimavská Seč	Banská Bystrica
Rimavská Sobota	Banská Bystrica
Rimavské Brezovo	Banská Bystrica
Rimavské Janovce	Banská Bystrica
Rimavské Zalužany	Banská Bystrica
Rišňovce	Nitra
Rohovce	Trnava
Rohov	Trnava
Rohožník	Prešov
Rohožník	Bratislava
Rochovce	Košice
Rokycany	Prešov
Rokytovce	Prešov
Rokytov	Prešov
Rokytov pri Humennom	Prešov
Rosina	Žilina
Roškovce	Prešov
Roštár	Košice
Rovensko	Trnava
Rovinka	Bratislava
Rovňany	Banská Bystrica
Rovné	Prešov
Rovné	Banská Bystrica
Rovné	Prešov
Rozhanovce	Košice
Rozložná	Košice
Roztoky	Prešov
Rožkovany	Prešov
Rožňava	Košice
Rožňavské Bystré	Košice
Rúbaň	Nitra
Rudina	Žilina
Rudinka	Žilina
Rudinská	Žilina
Rudlov	Prešov
Rudňany	Košice
Rudná	Košice
Rudnianska Lehota	Trenčín
Rudník	Košice
Rudník	Trenčín
Rudno nad Hronom	Banská Bystrica
Rudno	Žilina
Rumanová	Nitra
Rumince	Banská Bystrica
Runina	Prešov
Ruská Bystrá	Košice
Ruská Kajňa	Prešov
Ruská	Košice
Ruská Nová Ves	Prešov
Ruská Poruba	Prešov
Ruská Voľa nad Popradom	Prešov
Ruská Voľa	Prešov
Ruská Volová	Prešov
Ruskovce	Trenčín
Ruskovce	Košice
Ruskov	Košice
Ruský Hrabovec	Košice
Ruský Potok	Prešov
Ružiná	Banská Bystrica
Ružindol	Trnava
Ružomberok	Žilina
Rybany	Trenčín
Rybky	Trnava
Rybník	Nitra
Rybník	Banská Bystrica
Rykynčice	Banská Bystrica
Sabinov	Prešov
Sačurov	Prešov
Sádočné	Trenčín
Sady nad Torysou	Košice
Salka	Nitra
Santovka	Nitra
Sap	Trnava
Sása	Banská Bystrica
Sása	Banská Bystrica
Sasinkovo	Trnava
Sazdice	Nitra
Sebedín-Bečov	Banská Bystrica
Sebedražie	Trenčín
Sebechleby	Banská Bystrica
Sečianky	Banská Bystrica
Sečovce	Košice
Sečovská Polianka	Prešov
Seč	Trenčín
Sedliacka Dubová	Žilina
Sedlice	Prešov
Sedliská	Prešov
Sedmerovec	Trenčín
Sejkov	Košice
Sekule	Trnava
Seľany	Banská Bystrica
Selce	Banská Bystrica
Selce	Banská Bystrica
Selce	Banská Bystrica
Selec	Trenčín
Selice	Nitra
Semerovo	Nitra
Seňa	Košice
Senec	Bratislava
Seniakovce	Prešov
Senica	Trnava
Senné	Košice
Senné	Banská Bystrica
Senohrad	Banská Bystrica
Sereď	Trnava
Sielnica	Banská Bystrica
Sihelné	Žilina
Sihla	Banská Bystrica
Sikenica	Nitra
Sikenička	Nitra
Siladice	Trnava
Silica	Košice
Silická Brezová	Košice
Silická Jablonica	Košice
Sirk	Banská Bystrica
Sirník	Košice
Skačany	Trenčín
Skalica	Trnava
Skalité	Žilina
Skalka nad Váhom	Trenčín
Skároš	Košice
Skerešovo	Banská Bystrica
Sklabiná	Banská Bystrica
Sklabiňa	Žilina
Sklabinský Podzámok	Žilina
Sklené Teplice	Banská Bystrica
Sklené	Žilina
Skrabské	Prešov
Skýcov	Nitra
Sládkovičovo	Trnava
Slančík	Košice
Slanec	Košice
Slanská Huta	Košice
Slanské Nové Mesto	Košice
Slaská	Banská Bystrica
Slatina	Nitra
Slatina nad Bebravou	Trenčín
Slatinka nad Bebravou	Trenčín
Slatinské Lazy	Banská Bystrica
Slatvina	Košice
Slavec	Košice
Slavkovce	Košice
Slavnica	Trenčín
Slavoška	Košice
Slavošovce	Košice
Sľažany	Nitra
Slepčany	Nitra
Sliač	Banská Bystrica
Sliepkovce	Košice
Slivník	Košice
Slizké	Banská Bystrica
Slopná	Trenčín
Slovany	Žilina
Slovenská Kajňa	Prešov
Slovenská Ľupča	Banská Bystrica
Slovenská Nová Ves	Trnava
Slovenská Ves	Prešov
Slovenská Volová	Prešov
Slovenské Ďarmoty	Banská Bystrica
Slovenské Kľačany	Banská Bystrica
Slovenské Krivé	Prešov
Slovenské Nové Mesto	Košice
Slovenské Pravno	Žilina
Slovenský Grob	Bratislava
Slovinky	Košice
Smilno	Prešov
Smižany	Košice
Smolenice	Trnava
Smolinské	Trnava
Smolnícka Huta	Košice
Smolník	Košice
Smrdáky	Trnava
Smrečany	Žilina
Snakov	Prešov
Snežnica	Žilina
Snina	Prešov
Soblahov	Trenčín
Soboš	Prešov
Sobotište	Trnava
Sobrance	Košice
Socovce	Žilina
Sokoľany	Košice
Sokolce	Nitra
Sokoľ	Košice
Sokolovce	Trnava
Solčany	Nitra
Solčianky	Nitra
Soľnička	Košice
Soľník	Prešov
Sološnica	Bratislava
Soľ	Prešov
Somotor	Košice
Sopkovce	Prešov
Spišská Belá	Prešov
Spišská Nová Ves	Košice
Spišská Stará Ves	Prešov
Spišská Teplica	Prešov
Spišské Bystré	Prešov
Spišské Hanušovce	Prešov
Spišské Podhradie	Prešov
Spišské Tomášovce	Košice
Spišské Vlachy	Košice
Spišský Hrhov	Prešov
Spišský Hrušov	Košice
Spišský Štiavnik	Prešov
Spišský Štvrtok	Prešov
Stakčín	Prešov
Stakčínska Roztoka	Prešov
Stanča	Košice
Stankovany	Žilina
Stankovce	Košice
Stará Bašta	Banská Bystrica
Stará Bystrica	Žilina
Stará Halič	Banská Bystrica
Stará Huta	Banská Bystrica
Stará Kremnička	Banská Bystrica
Stará Lehota	Trenčín
Stará Lesná	Prešov
Stará Ľubovňa	Prešov
Stará Myjava	Trenčín
Stará Turá	Trenčín
Stará Voda	Košice
Staré Hory	Banská Bystrica
Staré	Košice
Starina	Prešov
Starý Hrádok	Nitra
Starý Tekov	Nitra
Staškovce	Prešov
Staškov	Žilina
Stebnícka Huta	Prešov
Stebník	Prešov
Stožok	Banská Bystrica
Stráňany	Prešov
Stráňavy	Žilina
Stráne pod Tatrami	Prešov
Stránska	Banská Bystrica
Stránske	Žilina
Stratená	Košice
Stráža	Žilina
Strážne	Košice
Strážske	Košice
Strečno	Žilina
Streda nad Bodrogom	Košice
Stredné Plachtince	Banská Bystrica
Strekov	Nitra
Strelníky	Banská Bystrica
Stretava	Košice
Stretavka	Košice
Streženice	Trenčín
Strihovce	Prešov
Stročín	Prešov
Stropkov	Prešov
Studená	Banská Bystrica
Studenec (Levoča District)	Prešov
Studienka	Bratislava
Stuľany	Prešov
Stupava	Bratislava
Stupné	Trenčín
Sučany	Žilina
Sudince	Banská Bystrica
Súdovce	Banská Bystrica
Suchá Dolina	Prešov
Suchá Hora	Žilina
Suchá nad Parnou	Trnava
Sucháň	Banská Bystrica
Suché Brezovo	Banská Bystrica
Suché	Košice
Suchohrad	Bratislava
Sukov	Prešov
Sulín	Prešov
Súlovce	Nitra
Súľov-Hradná	Žilina
Sušany	Banská Bystrica
Sútor	Banská Bystrica
Svätá Mária	Košice
Svätoplukovo	Nitra
Svätuše	Košice
Svätuš	Košice
Svätý Anton	Banská Bystrica
Svätý Jur	Bratislava
Svätý Kríž	Žilina
Svätý Peter	Nitra
Svederník	Žilina
Sverepec	Trenčín
Sveržov	Prešov
Svetlice	Prešov
Svidnička	Prešov
Svidník	Prešov
Svinia	Prešov
Svinica	Košice
Svinice	Košice
Svinná	Trenčín
Svit	Prešov
Svodín	Nitra
Svrbice	Nitra
Svrčinovec	Žilina
Šahy	Nitra
Šajdíkove Humence	Trnava
Šaľa	Nitra
Šalgočka	Trnava
Šalgovce	Nitra
Šalov	Nitra
Šambron	Prešov
Šamorín	Trnava
Šamudovce	Košice
Šandal	Prešov
Šarbov	Prešov
Šarišská Poruba	Prešov
Šarišská Trstená	Prešov
Šarišské Bohdanovce	Prešov
Šarišské Čierne	Prešov
Šarišské Dravce	Prešov
Šarišské Jastrabie	Prešov
Šarišské Michaľany	Prešov
Šarišské Sokolovce	Prešov
Šarišský Štiavnik	Prešov
Šarkan	Nitra
Šarovce	Nitra
Šašová	Prešov
Šaštín-Stráže	Trnava
Šávoľ	Banská Bystrica
Šelpice	Trnava
Šemetkovce	Prešov
Šemša	Košice
Šenkvice	Bratislava
Šiatorská Bukovinka	Banská Bystrica
Šiba	Prešov
Šíd	Banská Bystrica
Šimonovce	Banská Bystrica
Šindliar	Prešov
Šintava	Trnava
Šípkové	Trnava
Šípkov	Trenčín
Širákov	Banská Bystrica
Širkovce	Banská Bystrica
Široké	Prešov
Šišov	Trenčín
Šivetice	Banská Bystrica
Šmigovec	Prešov
Šoltýska	Banská Bystrica
Šoporňa	Trnava
Špačince	Trnava
Špania Dolina	Banská Bystrica
Španie Pole	Banská Bystrica
Šrobárová	Nitra
Štefanová	Bratislava
Štefanovce	Prešov
Štefanovce	Prešov
Štefanovičová	Nitra
Štefanov nad Oravou	Žilina
Štefanov	Trnava
Štefurov	Prešov
Šterusy	Trnava
Štiavnické Bane	Banská Bystrica
Štiavnička	Žilina
Štiavnik	Žilina
Štitáre	Nitra
Štítnik	Košice
Štôla	Prešov
Štós	Košice
Štrba	Prešov
Štrkovec	Banská Bystrica
Štúrovo	Nitra
Štvrtok na Ostrove	Trnava
Štvrtok	Trenčín
Šuja	Žilina
Šuľa	Banská Bystrica
Šumiac	Banská Bystrica
Šuňava	Prešov
Šurany	Nitra
Šurianky	Nitra
Šurice	Banská Bystrica
Šúrovce	Trnava
Šútovce	Trenčín
Šútovo	Žilina
Švábovce	Prešov
Švedlár	Košice
Švošov	Žilina
Tachty	Banská Bystrica
Tajná	Nitra
Tajov	Banská Bystrica
Ťapešovo	Žilina
Tarnov	Prešov
Tašuľa	Košice
Tatranská Javorina	Prešov
Tehla	Nitra
Tekolďany	Trnava
Tekovská Breznica	Banská Bystrica
Tekovské Lužany	Nitra
Tekovské Nemce	Nitra
Tekovský Hrádok	Nitra
Telgárt	Banská Bystrica
Telince	Nitra
Temeš	Trenčín
Teplička nad Váhom	Žilina
Teplička	Košice
Tepličky	Trnava
Teplý Vrch	Banská Bystrica
Terany	Banská Bystrica
Terchová	Žilina
Teriakovce	Prešov
Terňa	Prešov
Tesáre	Nitra
Tesárske Mlyňany	Nitra
Tešedíkovo	Nitra
Tibava	Košice
Tichý Potok	Prešov
Timoradza	Trenčín
Tisinec	Prešov
Tisovec	Banská Bystrica
Tlmače	Nitra
Točnica	Banská Bystrica
Tokajík	Prešov
Tomášikovo	Trnava
Tomášov	Bratislava
Tomášovce	Banská Bystrica
Tomášovce	Banská Bystrica
Tôň	Nitra
Topoľa	Prešov
Topoľčany	Nitra
Topoľčianky	Nitra
Topoľnica	Trnava
Topoľníky	Trnava
Topoľovka	Prešov
Toporec	Prešov
Tornaľa	Banská Bystrica
Torysa (village)	Prešov
Torysky	Prešov
Tovarné	Prešov
Tovarnianska Polianka	Prešov
Tovarníky	Nitra
Trakovice	Trnava
Trávnica	Nitra
Trávnik	Nitra
Trebatice	Trnava
Trebejov	Košice
Trebeľovce	Banská Bystrica
Trebichava	Trenčín
Trebišov	Košice
Trebostovo	Žilina
Trebušovce	Banská Bystrica
Trenč	Banská Bystrica
Trenčianska Teplá	Trenčín
Trenčianska Turná	Trenčín
Trenčianske Bohuslavice	Trenčín
Trenčianske Jastrabie	Trenčín
Trenčianske Mitice	Trenčín
Trenčianske Stankovce	Trenčín
Trenčianske Teplice	Trenčín
Trenčín	Trenčín
Trhová Hradská	Trnava
Trhovište	Košice
Trnavá Hora	Banská Bystrica
Trnava pri Laborci	Košice
Trnava	Trnava
Trnávka	Trnava
Trnávka	Košice
Tŕnie	Banská Bystrica
Trnkov	Prešov
Trnovec nad Váhom	Nitra
Trnovec	Trnava
Trnovo	Žilina
Tročany	Prešov
Trpín	Banská Bystrica
Trsťany	Košice
Trstená na Ostrove	Trnava
Trstená	Žilina
Trstené pri Hornáde	Košice
Trstené	Žilina
Trstice	Trnava
Trstín	Trnava
Tuhár	Banská Bystrica
Tuhrina	Prešov
Tuchyňa	Trenčín
Tulčík	Prešov
Tupá	Nitra
Turá	Nitra
Turany nad Ondavou	Prešov
Turany	Žilina
Turcovce	Prešov
Turček	Žilina
Turčianky	Trenčín
Turčianska Štiavnička	Žilina
Turčianske Jaseno	Žilina
Turčianske Kľačany	Žilina
Turčianske Teplice	Žilina
Turčiansky Ďur	Žilina
Turčiansky Peter	Žilina
Turčok	Banská Bystrica
Turecká	Banská Bystrica
Tureň	Bratislava
Turie	Žilina
Turík	Žilina
Turňa nad Bodvou	Košice
Turnianska Nová Ves	Košice
Turová	Banská Bystrica
Turzovka	Žilina
Tušice	Košice
Tušická Nová Ves	Košice
Tužina	Trenčín
Tvarožná	Prešov
Tvrdomestice	Nitra
Tvrdošín	Žilina
Tvrdošovce	Nitra
Ubľa	Prešov
Úbrež	Košice
Udavské	Prešov
Udiča	Trenčín
Údol	Prešov
Uhliská	Nitra
Úhorná	Košice
Uhorská Ves	Žilina
Uhorské	Banská Bystrica
Uhrovec	Trenčín
Uhrovské Podhradie	Trenčín
Úľany nad Žitavou	Nitra
Ulič	Prešov
Uličské Krivé	Prešov
Uloža	Prešov
Uňatín	Banská Bystrica
Unín	Trnava
Urmince	Nitra
Utekáč	Banská Bystrica
Uzovce	Prešov
Uzovská Panica	Banská Bystrica
Uzovské Pekľany	Prešov
Uzovský Šalgov	Prešov
Vaďovce	Trenčín
Vagrinec	Prešov
Váhovce	Trnava
Vajkovce	Košice
Valaliky	Košice
Valaská	Banská Bystrica
Valaská Belá	Trenčín
Valaská Dubová	Žilina
Valča	Žilina
Valentovce	Prešov
Valice	Banská Bystrica
Valkovce	Prešov
Vaľkovňa	Banská Bystrica
Vaniškovce	Prešov
Vápeník	Prešov
Varadka	Prešov
Varechovce	Prešov
Varhaňovce	Prešov
Varín	Žilina
Vasiľov	Žilina
Vavrečka	Žilina
Vavrinec	Prešov
Vavrišovo	Žilina
Važec	Žilina
Včelince	Banská Bystrica
Večelkov	Banská Bystrica
Vechec	Prešov
Veľaty	Košice
Velčice	Nitra
Veličná	Žilina
Veľká Čalomija	Banská Bystrica
Veľká Čausa	Trenčín
Veľká Čierna	Žilina
Veľká Dolina	Nitra
Veľká Franková	Prešov
Veľká Hradná	Trenčín
Veľká Ida	Košice
Veľká Lehota	Banská Bystrica
Veľká Lesná	Prešov
Veľká Lodina	Košice
Veľká Lomnica	Prešov
Veľká Lúka	Banská Bystrica
Veľká Mača	Trnava
Veľká nad Ipľom	Banská Bystrica
Veľká Paka	Trnava
Veľká Tŕňa	Košice
Veľká Ves	Banská Bystrica
Veľká Ves nad Ipľom	Banská Bystrica
Veľké Bierovce	Trenčín
Veľké Blahovo	Trnava
Veľké Borové	Žilina
Veľké Dravce	Banská Bystrica
Veľké Držkovce	Trenčín
Veľké Dvorany	Nitra
Veľké Dvorníky	Trnava
Veľké Hoste	Trenčín
Veľké Chlievany	Trenčín
Veľké Chyndice	Nitra
Veľké Kapušany	Košice
Veľké Kosihy	Nitra
Veľké Kostoľany	Trnava
Veľké Kozmálovce	Nitra
Veľké Kršteňany	Trenčín
Veľké Leváre	Bratislava
Veľké Lovce	Nitra
Veľké Ludince	Nitra
Veľké Orvište	Trnava
Veľké Ozorovce	Košice
Veľké Pole	Banská Bystrica
Veľké Raškovce	Košice
Veľké Revištia	Košice
Veľké Ripňany	Nitra
Veľké Rovné	Žilina
Veľké Slemence	Košice
Veľké Straciny	Banská Bystrica
Veľké Teriakovce	Banská Bystrica
Veľké Trakany	Košice
Veľké Turovce	Nitra
Veľké Uherce	Trenčín
Veľké Úľany	Trnava
Veľké Vozokany	Nitra
Veľké Zálužie	Nitra
Veľké Zlievce	Banská Bystrica
Veľkrop	Prešov
Veľký Biel	Bratislava
Veľký Blh	Banská Bystrica
Veľký Cetín	Nitra
Veľký Čepčín	Žilina
Veľký Ďur	Nitra
Veľký Folkmár	Košice
Veľký Grob	Trnava
Veľký Horeš	Košice
Veľký Kamenec	Košice
Veľký Klíž	Trenčín
Veľký Krtíš	Banská Bystrica
Veľký Kýr	Nitra
Veľký Lapáš	Nitra
Veľký Lipník	Prešov
Veľký Lom	Banská Bystrica
Veľký Meder	Trnava
Veľký Slavkov	Prešov
Veľký Slivník	Prešov
Veľký Šariš	Prešov
Veľopolie	Prešov
Velušovce	Nitra
Vernár	Prešov
Veselé	Trnava
Veterná Poruba	Žilina
Vidiná	Banská Bystrica
Vieska	Trnava
Vieska nad Blhom	Banská Bystrica
Vieska nad Žitavou	Nitra
Vieska	Banská Bystrica
Vígľaš	Banská Bystrica
Vígľašská Huta-Kalinka	Banská Bystrica
Vikartovce	Prešov
Vinica	Banská Bystrica
Viničky	Košice
Viničné	Bratislava
Vinné	Košice
Vinodol	Nitra
Vinohrady nad Váhom	Trnava
Vinosady	Bratislava
Virt	Nitra
Vislanka	Prešov
Vislava	Prešov
Visolaje	Trenčín
Višňové	Trenčín
Višňové	Banská Bystrica
Višňové	Žilina
Višňov	Košice
Vištuk	Bratislava
Vitanová	Žilina
Víťazovce	Prešov
Víťaz	Prešov
Vítkovce	Košice
Vlača	Prešov
Vladiča	Prešov
Vlachovo	Košice
Vlachy	Žilina
Vlčany	Nitra
Vlčkovce	Trnava
Vlkanová	Banská Bystrica
Vlkas	Nitra
Vlková	Prešov
Vlkovce	Prešov
Vlky	Bratislava
Vlkyňa	Banská Bystrica
Voderady	Trnava
Vojany	Košice
Vojčice	Košice
Vojka nad Dunajom	Trnava
Vojka	Košice
Vojkovce	Košice
Vojňany	Prešov
Vojnatina	Košice
Vojtovce	Prešov
Voľa	Košice
Volica	Prešov
Volkovce	Nitra
Voznica	Banská Bystrica
Vozokany	Trnava
Vozokany	Nitra
Vráble	Nitra
Vrádište	Trnava
Vrakúň	Trnava
Vranov nad Topľou	Prešov
Vrbnica	Košice
Vrbová nad Váhom	Nitra
Vrbovce	Trenčín
Vrbové	Trnava
Vrbovka	Banská Bystrica
Vrbov	Prešov
Vrchteplá	Trenčín
Vrícko	Žilina
Vršatské Podhradie	Trenčín
Vrútky	Žilina
Vtáčkovce	Košice
Výborná	Prešov
Výčapy-Opatovce	Nitra
Vydrany	Trnava
Vydrná	Trenčín
Vydrník	Prešov
Vyhne	Banská Bystrica
Východná	Žilina
Výrava (Medzilaborce District)	Prešov
Vysočany (Bánovce nad Bebravou District)	Trenčín
Vysoká	Banská Bystrica
Vysoká nad Kysucou	Žilina
Vysoká nad Uhom	Košice
Vysoká pri Morave	Bratislava
Vysoká	Prešov
Vysoké Tatry	Prešov
Vyškovce nad Ipľom	Nitra
Vyškovce	Prešov
Vyšná Boca	Žilina
Vyšná Hutka	Košice
Vyšná Jablonka	Prešov
Vyšná Jedľová	Prešov
Vyšná Kamenica	Košice
Vyšná Myšľa	Košice
Vyšná Olšava	Prešov
Vyšná Pisaná	Prešov
Vyšná Polianka	Prešov
Vyšná Rybnica	Košice
Vyšná Sitnica	Prešov
Vyšná Slaná	Košice
Vyšná Šebastová	Prešov
Vyšná Voľa	Prešov
Vyšné Ladičkovce	Prešov
Vyšné nad Hronom	Nitra
Vyšné Nemecké	Košice
Vyšné Remety	Košice
Vyšné Repaše	Prešov
Vyšné Ružbachy	Prešov
Vyšné Valice	Banská Bystrica
Vyšný Čaj	Košice
Vyšný Hrabovec	Prešov
Vyšný Hrušov	Prešov
Vyšný Kazimír	Prešov
Vyšný Klátov	Košice
Vyšný Komárnik	Prešov
Vyšný Kručov	Prešov
Vyšný Kubín	Žilina
Vyšný Medzev	Košice
Vyšný Mirošov	Prešov
Vyšný Orlík	Prešov
Vyšný Skálnik	Banská Bystrica
Vyšný Slavkov	Prešov
Vyšný Tvarožec	Prešov
Vyšný Žipov	Prešov
Zábiedovo	Žilina
Záborie	Žilina
Záborské	Prešov
Zádiel	Košice
Zádor	Banská Bystrica
Záhorce	Banská Bystrica
Záhorie (military district)	Bratislava
Záhor	Košice
Záhorská Ves	Bratislava
Záhradné	Prešov
Zacharovce	Banská Bystrica
Zákamenné	Žilina
Zákopčie	Žilina
Zalaba	Nitra
Zálesie	Prešov
Zálesie	Bratislava
Zalužice	Košice
Zamarovce	Trenčín
Zámutov	Prešov
Záriečie	Trenčín
Záskalie	Trenčín
Zatín	Košice
Závada	Prešov
Závada	Nitra
Závada	Banská Bystrica
Závadka	Košice
Závadka	Prešov
Závadka	Košice
Závadka nad Hronom	Banská Bystrica
Zavar	Trnava
Závažná Poruba	Žilina
Závod	Bratislava
Zázrivá	Žilina
Zbehňov	Košice
Zbehy	Nitra
Zbojné	Prešov
Zboj	Prešov
Zborov	Prešov
Zborov nad Bystricou	Žilina
Zbrojníky	Nitra
Zbudská Belá	Prešov
Zbudské Dlhé	Prešov
Zbudza	Košice
Zbyňov	Žilina
Zeleneč	Trnava
Zemianska Olča	Nitra
Zemianske Kostoľany	Trenčín
Zemianske Podhradie	Trenčín
Zemianske Sady	Trnava
Zemiansky Vrbovok	Banská Bystrica
Zemné	Nitra
Zemplínska Nová Ves	Košice
Zemplínska Široká	Košice
Zemplínska Teplica	Košice
Zemplínske Hámre	Prešov
Zemplínske Hradište	Košice
Zemplínske Jastrabie	Košice
Zemplínske Kopčany	Košice
Zemplínsky Branč	Košice
Zemplín (village)	Košice
Zlatá Baňa	Prešov
Zlatá Idka	Košice
Zlaté Klasy	Trnava
Zlaté Moravce	Nitra
Zlaté	Prešov
Zlatná na Ostrove	Nitra
Zlatník	Prešov
Zlatníky	Trenčín
Zlatno	Banská Bystrica
Zlatno	Nitra
Zliechov	Trenčín
Zohor	Bratislava
Zombor	Banská Bystrica
Zubák	Trenčín
Zuberec	Žilina
Zubné	Prešov
Zubrohlava	Žilina
Zvolen	Banská Bystrica
Zvolenská Slatina	Banská Bystrica
Zvončín	Trnava
Žabokreky nad Nitrou	Trenčín
Žabokreky	Žilina
Žakarovce	Košice
Žakovce	Prešov
Žalobín	Prešov
Žarnovica	Banská Bystrica
Žarnov	Košice
Žaškov	Žilina
Žbince	Košice
Ždaňa	Košice
Ždiar	Prešov
Žehňa	Prešov
Žehra	Košice
Železná Breznica	Banská Bystrica
Železník (village)	Prešov
Želiezovce	Nitra
Želmanovce	Prešov
Želovce	Banská Bystrica
Žemberovce	Nitra
Žemliare	Nitra
Žiar	Žilina
Žiar nad Hronom	Banská Bystrica
Žiar	Banská Bystrica
Žibritov	Banská Bystrica
Žihárec	Nitra
Žikava	Nitra
Žilina	Žilina
Žíp	Banská Bystrica
Žipov	Prešov
Žirany	Nitra
Žitavany	Nitra
Žitavce	Nitra
Žitná-Radiša	Trenčín
Žlkovce	Trnava
Župčany	Prešov
Župkov	Banská Bystrica
