= Skalica District =

Coordinates: 48°45′N 17°10′E

- District
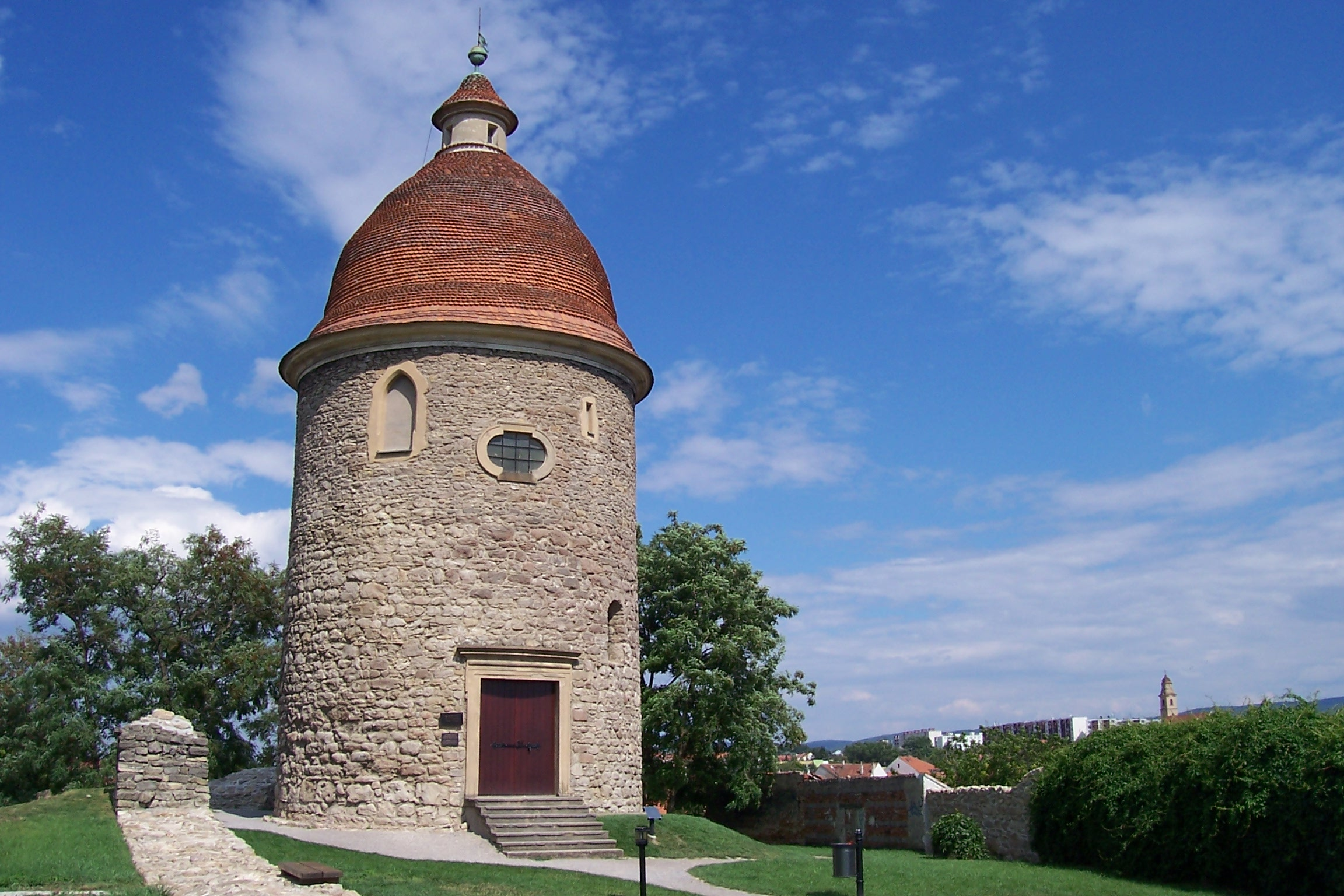
- Country: Slovakia
- Region (kraj): Trnava Region
- Seat: Skalica

Area
  - Total: 357.07 km^{2} (137.87 sq mi)

Population (2025)
  - Total: 46,440
- Time zone: UTC+1 (CET)
  - Summer (DST): UTC+2 (CEST)
- Telephone prefix: 034
- Vehicle registration plate (until 2022): SI
- Municipalities: 21

Skalica District (Slovak: okres Skalica) is a district in the Trnava Region of western Slovakia. It lies in the northern part of Záhorská nížina, a lowland between Bratislava and Czech Republic. The district was established in 1923 and its current borders have existed from 1996. Its largest town is its seat Skalica.

The main branch of the district's economy is industry.

Important cultural sights are the historical center of the town Skalica and a church in Kopčany, one of the oldest buildings in Slovakia, originating from the Great Moravian period.

== Population ==
Population statistic (10 years)
| Year | 1995 | 2005 | 2015 | 2025 |
|---|---|---|---|---|
| Count | 46,550 | 47,247 | 47,031 | 46,440 |
| Difference | | +1.49% | −0.45% | −1.25% |

Population statistic
| Year | 2024 | 2025 |
|---|---|---|
| Count | 46,764 | 46,440 |
| Difference | | −0.69% |

It has a population of 46,440 people (31 December 2025).

Historical population
| Year | Pop. | ±% |
|---|---|---|
| 1970 | 39,783 | — |
| 1980 | 43,979 | +10.5% |
| 1991 | 46,247 | +5.2% |
| 2001 | 46,791 | +1.2% |
| 2011 | 46,671 | −0.3% |
| 2021 | 47,525 | +1.8% |
Source: Statistical Office of the Slovak Republic

=== Ethnicity ===
Census 2021 (1+ %)
| Ethnicity | Number | Fraction |
|---|---|---|
| Slovak | 43,545 | 89.06% |
| Not found out | 3173 | 6.48% |
| Czech | 1192 | 2.43% |
| Total | 48,894 | |

In year 2021 was 48,894 people by ethnicity 43,545 as Slovak, 3173 as Not found out, 1192 as Czech, 318 as Romani, 128 as Other, 98 as Ukrainian, 77 as Hungarian, 70 as Moravian, 55 as Russian, 53 as Romanian, 30 as Rusyn, 26 as German, 23 as Italian, 17 as Austrian, 17 as Polish, 16 as Vietnamese, 9 as Bulgarian, 7 as Jewish, 7 as English, 6 as Serbian, 6 as French, 5 as Croatian, 4 as Chinese, 3 as Silesian, 3 as Albanian, 2 as Irish, 2 as Canadian, 1 as Turkish and 1 as Greek.

Note on population: The difference values of population numbers in the table "Population statistic" and in the sections "Ethnicity" & "Religion" is caused by the use of various statistical methods.

=== Religion ===
Census 2021 (1+ %)
| Religion | Number | Fraction |
|---|---|---|
| Roman Catholic Church | 27,425 | 57.71% |
| None | 13,629 | 28.68% |
| Not found out | 3610 | 7.6% |
| Evangelical Church | 1705 | 3.59% |
| Total | 47,525 | |

In year 2021 was 47,525 people by religion 27,425 from Roman Catholic Church, 13,629 from None, 3610 from Not found out, 1705 from Evangelical Church, 214 from Greek Catholic Church, 167 from Ad hoc movements, 153 from Eastern Orthodox Church, 153 from Christian Congregations in Slovakia, 99 from Other, 62 from Jehovah's Witnesses, 58 from Other and not ascertained christian church, 53 from Buddhism, 42 from Calvinist Church, 32 from Paganism and natural spirituality, 26 from United Methodist Church, 18 from Apostolic Church, 17 from Seventh-day Adventist Church, 14 from Islam, 10 from Hinduism, 8 from Czechoslovak Hussite Church, 8 from Church of Jesus Christ of Latter-day Saints, 8 from Baptists Church, 6 from Jewish community, 5 from Old Catholic Church and 3 from New Apostolic Church.

== Municipalities ==
Skalica District consists of 18 municipalities; in three of them are towns.

| Municipality | Area [km^{2}] | Population |
|---|---|---|
| Brodské | 20.36 | 2,244 |
| Dubovce | 8.45 | 623 |
| Gbely | 60.75 | 4,801 |
| Holíč | 34.82 | 10,735 |
| Chropov | 17.79 | 355 |
| Kátov | 4.39 | 627 |
| Kopčany | 22.11 | 2,537 |
| Koválovec | 8.49 | 144 |
| Letničie | 6.63 | 484 |
| Lopašov | 5.21 | 332 |
| Mokrý Háj | 6.87 | 682 |
| Oreské | 3.72 | 397 |
| Petrova Ves | 14.67 | 1,081 |
| Popudinské Močidľany | 10.82 | 981 |
| Prietržka | 4.69 | 554 |
| Radimov | 12.83 | 501 |
| Radošovce | 26.59 | 1,711 |
| Skalica | 59.77 | 15,358 |
| Trnovec | 2.52 | 293 |
| Unín | 22.78 | 1,149 |
| Vrádište | 4.25 | 851 |

Population and area values are current for year 2025.
