= Mokrý Háj =

- Municipality
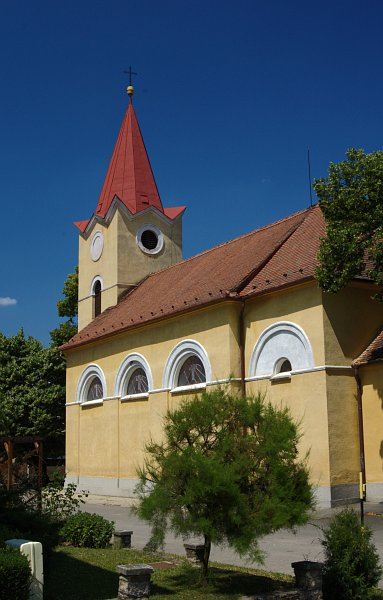
- Church of All Saints

- Flag

- Location of Mokrý Háj in the Trnava Region Location of Mokrý Háj in Slovakia
- Coordinates: 48.82°N 17.25°E
- Country: Slovakia
- Region: Trnava Region
- District: Skalica District
- First mentioned: 1569

Area
  - Total: 6.87 km^{2} (2.65 sq mi)
- Elevation: 263 m (863 ft)

Population (2025)
  - Total: 682
- Time zone: UTC+1 (CET)
  - Summer (DST): UTC+2 (CEST)
- Postal code: 908 65
- Area code: +421 34
- Vehicle registration plate (until 2022): SI
- Website: mokryhaj.sk

Mokrý Háj (Hungarian: Horvátberek) is a village and municipality in Skalica District in the Trnava Region of western Slovakia.

== History ==
In historical records the village was first mentioned in 1569.

== Geography ==
The municipality lies at an altitude of 263 metres (863 ft) and covers an area of 6.87 km^{2} (2.65 sq mi) (2025).

== Population ==
Population statistic (10 years)
Year	1995	2005	2015	2025
Count	563	637	713	682
Difference		+13.14%	+11.93%	−4.34%

Population statistic
Year	2024	2025
Count	680	682
Difference		+0.29%

It has a population of 682 people (31 December 2025).

=== Ethnicity ===
Census 2021 (1+%)
Ethnicity	Number	Fraction
Slovak	689	94.51%
Not found out	24	3.29%
Czech	13	1.78%
Total	729	

In year 2021 was 729 people by ethnicity 689 as Slovak, 24 as Not found out, 13 as Czech, 3 as Romanian, 2 as Serbian, 2 as Hungarian, 2 as Croatian, 1 as Rusyn, 1 as Russian, 1 as Austrian, 1 as Moravian and 1 as Other.

Note on population: The difference values of population numbers in the table "Population statistic" and in the sections "Ethnicity" & "Religion" is caused by the use of various statistical methods.

=== Religion ===
Census 2021 (1+%)
Religion	Number	Fraction
Roman Catholic Church	524	71.88%
None	149	20.44%
Not found out	33	4.53%
Evangelical Church	10	1.37%
Total	729	

In year 2021 was 729 people by religion 524 from Roman Catholic Church, 149 from None, 33 from Not found out, 10 from Evangelical Church, 4 from Paganism and natural spirituality, 3 from Other, 2 from Eastern Orthodox Church, 1 from Other and not ascertained christian church, 1 from Greek Catholic Church, 1 from Buddhism and 1 from Ad hoc movements.
