= Petrova Ves =

- Municipality
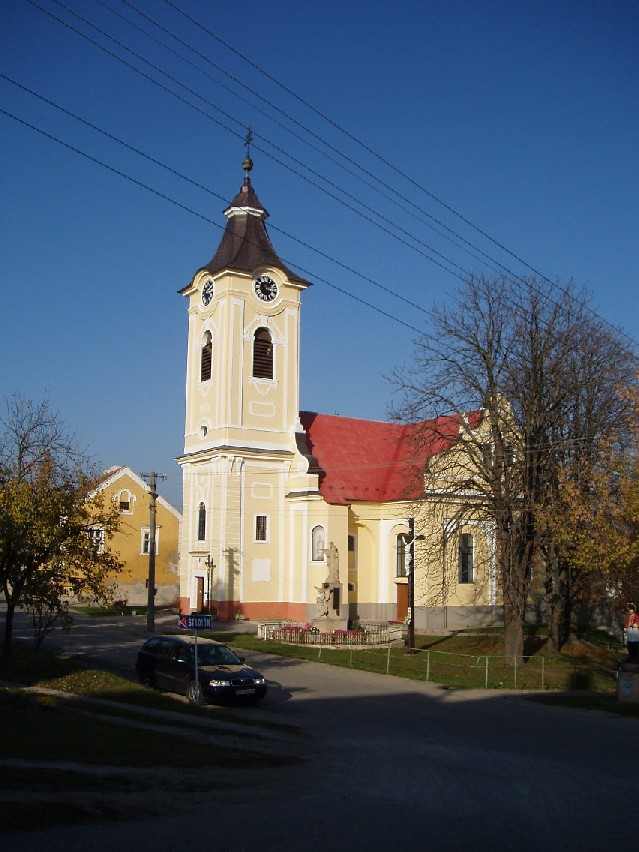

- Flag

- Location of Petrova Ves in the Trnava Region Location of Petrova Ves in Slovakia
- Coordinates: 48.72°N 17.16°E
- Country: Slovakia
- Region: Trnava Region
- District: Skalica District
- First mentioned: 1392

Area
  - Total: 14.67 km^{2} (5.66 sq mi)
- Elevation: 206 m (676 ft)

Population (2025)
  - Total: 1,081
- Time zone: UTC+1 (CET)
  - Summer (DST): UTC+2 (CEST)
- Postal code: 908 44
- Area code: +421 34
- Vehicle registration plate (until 2022): SI
- Website: www.petrovaves.sk

Petrova Ves (Hungarian: Péterlak) is a village and municipality in Skalica District in the Trnava Region of western Slovakia.

== History ==
In historical records the village was first mentioned in 1392. However, the village was inhabited for a long time before. Archaeological studies revealed the existence of Celtic and Roman settlements, which were subsequently replaced by Slavic settlement in the 9th century. In that time, the municipality and surroundings were part of the Great Moravia. At the end of the 11th century the village became part of the Hungarian Kingdom.

The name of the village comes from Peter Varády, an important Hungarian aristocrat who came to the village in the year 1093. Therefore, the village was named Peterlak in Hungarian, Petrovilla in Latin and Petersdorf in German. Since the end of World War I, the former Czechoslovak state proclaimed the name Petrova Ves as the official name of the village.

== Geography ==
The municipality lies at an altitude of 206 metres (676 ft) and covers an area of 14.67 km^{2} (5.66 sq mi) (2025).

== Population ==
Population statistic (10 years)
Year	1995	2005	2015	2025
Count	1016	1005	1085	1081
Difference		−1.08%	+7.96%	−0.36%

Population statistic
Year	2024	2025
Count	1082	1081
Difference		−0.09%

It has a population of 1081 people (31 December 2025).

=== Ethnicity ===
Census 2021 (1+%)
Ethnicity	Number	Fraction
Slovak	1059	97.87%
Total	1082	

In year 2021 was 1082 people by ethnicity 1059 as Slovak, 9 as Czech, 6 as Not found out, 6 as Other, 5 as Hungarian, 4 as Italian, 2 as Austrian, 2 as German and 1 as Moravian.

Note on population: The difference values of population numbers in the table "Population statistic" and in the sections "Ethnicity" & "Religion" is caused by the use of various statistical methods.

=== Religion ===
Census 2021 (1+%)
Religion	Number	Fraction
Roman Catholic Church	867	80.13%
None	164	15.16%
Not found out	17	1.57%
Total	1082	

In year 2021 was 1082 people by religion 867 from Roman Catholic Church, 164 from None, 17 from Not found out, 10 from Evangelical Church, 9 from Christian Congregations in Slovakia, 4 from Greek Catholic Church, 4 from Ad hoc movements, 2 from Jehovah's Witnesses, 1 from Eastern Orthodox Church, 1 from Other and not ascertained christian church, 1 from Other, 1 from United Methodist Church and 1 from Church of Jesus Christ of Latter-day Saints.
