= Letničie =

Village in Slovakia

- Municipality
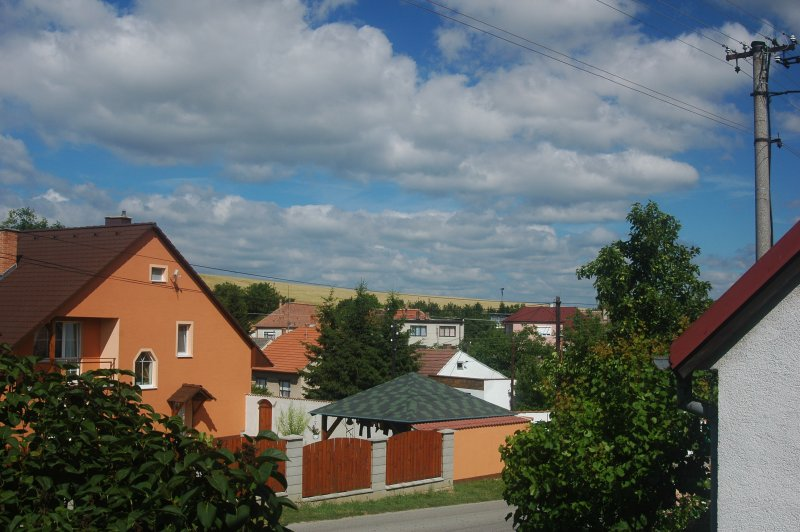

- Flag

- Location of Letničie in the Trnava Region Location of Letničie in Slovakia
- Coordinates: 48.71°N 17.18°E
- Country: Slovakia
- Region: Trnava Region
- District: Skalica District
- First mentioned: 1532

Government
  - Mayor: Marián Dvorský

Area
  - Total: 6.63 km^{2} (2.56 sq mi)
- Elevation: 213 m (699 ft)

Population (2025)
  - Total: 484
- Time zone: UTC+1 (CET)
  - Summer (DST): UTC+2 (CEST)
- Postal code: 908 44
- Area code: +421 34
- Vehicle registration plate (until 2022): SI
- Website: letnicie.sk

Letničie (Hungarian: Letenőc) is a village and municipality in Skalica District in the Trnava Region of western Slovakia.

Mayor Marián Dvorský was elected in 2010. Deputy mayor is Mgr Katarína Smolinská.

== History ==
In historical records the village was first mentioned in 1532.

== Monuments ==
There is the Roman Catholic Church of St. John the Baptist since 1822, and a Pieta built to honor a soldier killed in the First World War. Near the church there is a memorial of heroes killed in the Slovak National Uprising. At the municipal office building is a memorial plaque of Anton Vaculka who died in the village of Haj.

== Geography ==
The municipality lies at an altitude of 213 metres (699 ft) and covers an area of 6.63 km^{2} (2.56 sq mi) (2025).

== Population ==
Population statistic (10 years)
Year	1995	2005	2015	2025
Count	536	525	513	484
Difference		−2.05%	−2.28%	−5.65%

Population statistic
Year	2024	2025
Count	490	484
Difference		−1.22%

It has a population of 484 people (31 December 2025).

=== Ethnicity ===
Census 2021 (1+ %)
Ethnicity	Number	Fraction
Slovak	485	97%
Czech	12	2.4%
Not found out	5	1%
Total	500	

In year 2021 was 500 people by ethnicity 485 as Slovak, 12 as Czech, 5 as Not found out, 2 as Romani, 1 as Jewish, 1 as Serbian and 1 as Hungarian.

Note on population: The difference values of population numbers in the table "Population statistic" and in the sections "Ethnicity" & "Religion" is caused by the use of various statistical methods.

=== Religion ===
Census 2021 (1+ %)
Religion	Number	Fraction
Roman Catholic Church	401	80.2%
None	82	16.4%
Not found out	9	1.8%
Total	500	

In year 2021 was 500 people by religion 401 from Roman Catholic Church, 82 from None, 9 from Not found out, 4 from Evangelical Church, 2 from Greek Catholic Church, 1 from Calvinist Church and 1 from Ad hoc movements.
