= Koválovec =

- Municipality
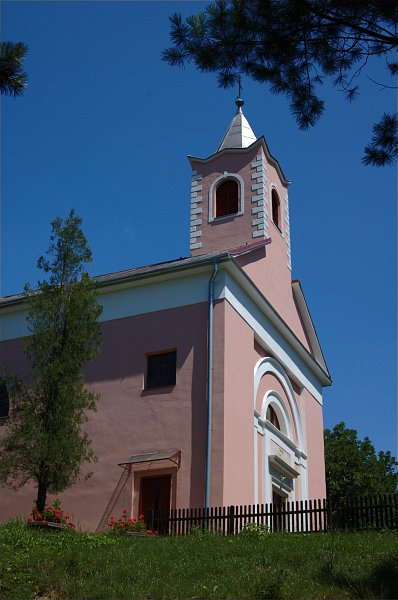

- Flag

- Location of Koválovec in the Trnava Region Location of Koválovec in Slovakia
- Coordinates: 48.78°N 17.30°E
- Country: Slovakia
- Region: Trnava Region
- District: Skalica District
- First mentioned: 1394

Area
  - Total: 8.49 km^{2} (3.28 sq mi)
- Elevation: 254 m (833 ft)

Population (2025)
  - Total: 144
- Time zone: UTC+1 (CET)
  - Summer (DST): UTC+2 (CEST)
- Postal code: 908 63
- Area code: +421 34
- Vehicle registration plate (until 2022): SI
- Website: www.kovalovec.sk

Koválovec (Hungarian: Kiskovalló) is a village and municipality in Skalica District in the Trnava Region of western Slovakia.

== History ==
In historical records the village was first mentioned in 1394.

== Geography ==
The municipality lies at an altitude of 254 metres (833 ft) and covers an area of 8.49 km^{2} (3.28 sq mi) (2025).

== Population ==
Population statistic (10 years)
Year	1995	2005	2015	2025
Count	137	151	141	144
Difference		+10.21%	−6.62%	+2.12%

Population statistic
Year	2024	2025
Count	141	144
Difference		+2.12%

It has a population of 144 people (31 December 2025).

=== Ethnicity ===
Census 2021 (1+ %)
Ethnicity	Number	Fraction
Slovak	137	95.13%
Moravian	6	4.16%
Not found out	5	3.47%
Czech	3	2.08%
Italian	3	2.08%
Total	144	

In year 2021 was 144 people by ethnicity 137 as Slovak, 6 as Moravian, 5 as Not found out, 3 as Czech, 3 as Italian and 1 as Other.

Note on population: The difference values of population numbers in the table "Population statistic" and in the sections "Ethnicity" & "Religion" is caused by the use of various statistical methods.

=== Religion ===
Census 2021 (1+ %)
Religion	Number	Fraction
Roman Catholic Church	94	65.28%
None	37	25.69%
Evangelical Church	8	5.56%
Total	144	

In year 2021 was 144 people by religion 94 from Roman Catholic Church, 37 from None, 8 from Evangelical Church, 1 from Not found out, 1 from Christian Congregations in Slovakia, 1 from Buddhism, 1 from Baptists Church and 1 from Ad hoc movements.

== Genealogical resources ==
The records for genealogical research are available at the state archive "Statny Archiv in Bratislava, Slovakia"

- Roman Catholic church records (births/marriages/deaths): 1635-1927 (parish B)

== See also ==
- List of municipalities and towns in Slovakia
