= Prietržka =

- Municipality
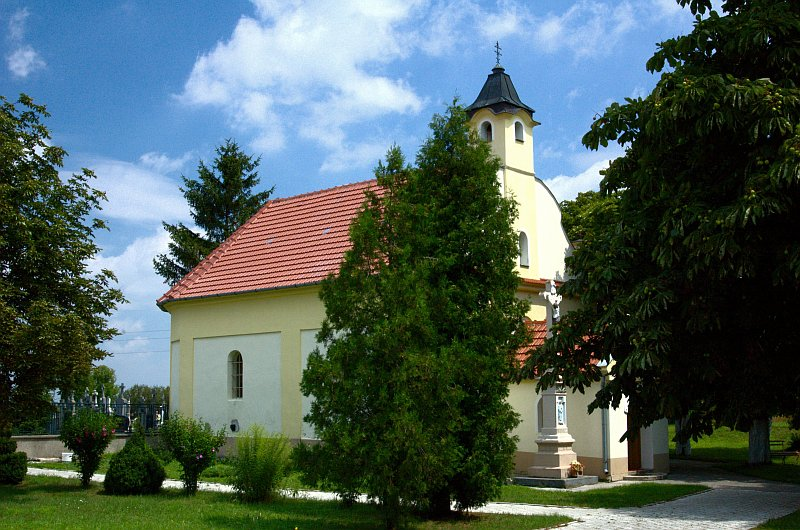
- Church of Saints Rosalia and Elisabeth

- Flag

- Location of Prietržka in the Trnava Region Location of Prietržka in Slovakia
- Coordinates: 48.80°N 17.20°E
- Country: Slovakia
- Region: Trnava Region
- District: Skalica District
- First mentioned: 1392

Area
  - Total: 4.69 km^{2} (1.81 sq mi)
- Elevation: 178 m (584 ft)

Population (2025)
  - Total: 554
- Time zone: UTC+1 (CET)
  - Summer (DST): UTC+2 (CEST)
- Postal code: 908 49
- Area code: +421 34
- Vehicle registration plate (until 2022): SI
- Website: prietrzka.sk

Prietržka (Hungarian: Kispetrős) is a village and municipality in Skalica District in the Trnava Region of western Slovakia.

== History ==
In historical records the village was first mentioned in 1392.

== Geography ==
The municipality lies at an altitude of 178 metres (584 ft) and covers an area of 4.69 km^{2} (1.81 sq mi) (2025).

== Population ==
Population statistic (10 years)
| Year | 1995 | 2005 | 2015 | 2025 |
|---|---|---|---|---|
| Count | 429 | 467 | 489 | 554 |
| Difference | | +8.85% | +4.71% | +13.29% |

Population statistic
| Year | 2024 | 2025 |
|---|---|---|
| Count | 557 | 554 |
| Difference | | −0.53% |

It has a population of 554 people (31 December 2025).

=== Ethnicity ===
Census 2021 (1+ %)
| Ethnicity | Number | Fraction |
|---|---|---|
| Slovak | 517 | 96.09% |
| Not found out | 19 | 3.53% |
| Total | 538 | |

In year 2021 was 538 people by ethnicity 517 as Slovak, 19 as Not found out, 5 as Czech, 3 as Other, 1 as Russian and 1 as Moravian.

Note on population: The difference values of population numbers in the table "Population statistic" and in the sections "Ethnicity" & "Religion" is caused by the use of various statistical methods.

=== Religion ===
Census 2021 (1+ %)
| Religion | Number | Fraction |
|---|---|---|
| Roman Catholic Church | 385 | 71.56% |
| None | 91 | 16.91% |
| Not found out | 22 | 4.09% |
| Evangelical Church | 15 | 2.79% |
| Other | 10 | 1.86% |
| Other and not ascertained christian church | 7 | 1.3% |
| Total | 538 | |

In year 2021 was 538 people by religion 385 from Roman Catholic Church, 91 from None, 22 from Not found out, 15 from Evangelical Church, 10 from Other, 7 from Other and not ascertained christian church, 3 from Christian Congregations in Slovakia, 2 from Jehovah's Witnesses, 1 from Old Catholic Church, 1 from Greek Catholic Church and 1 from United Methodist Church.
