= Kátov =

- Municipality
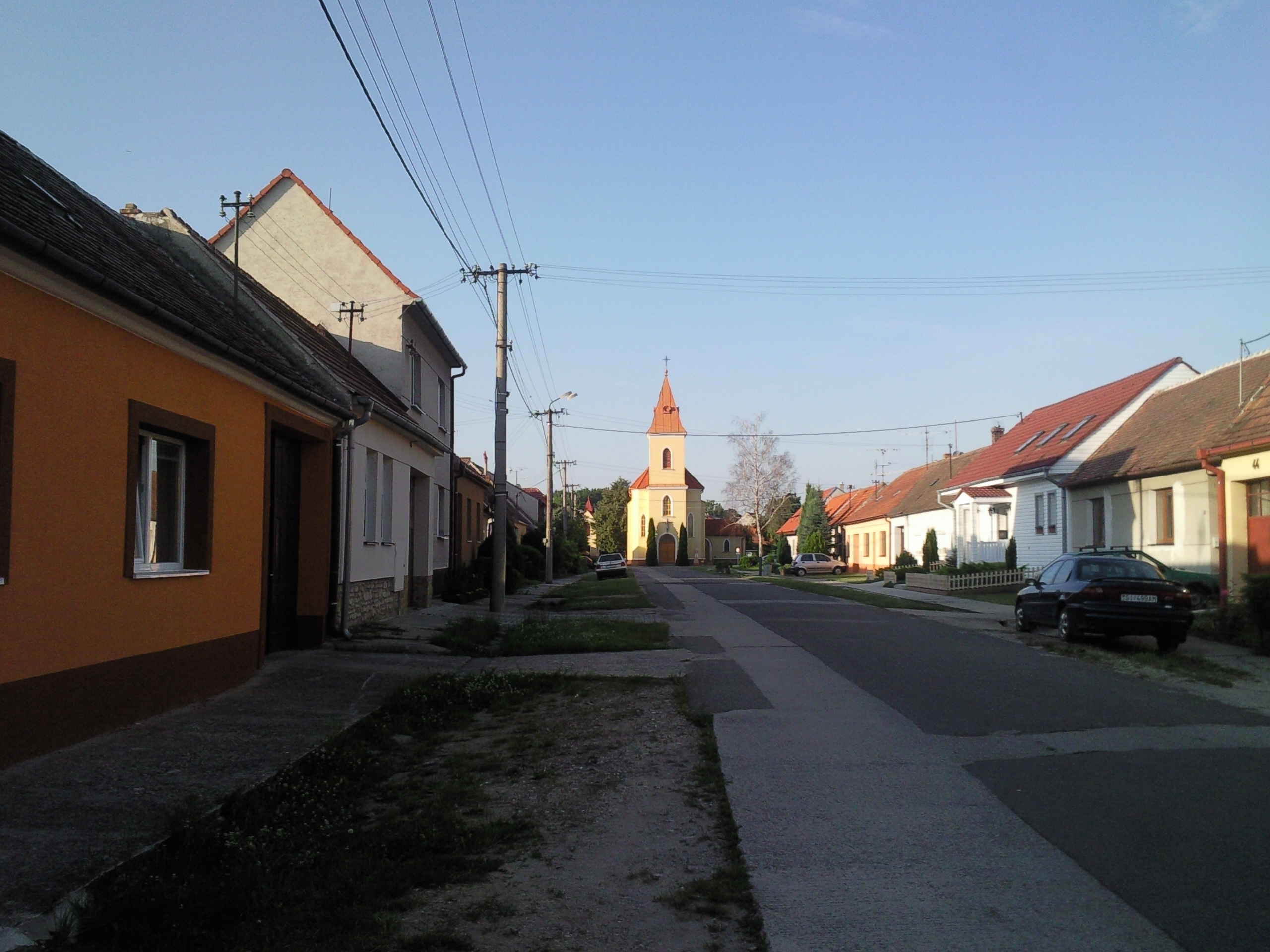

- Flag

- Location of Kátov in the Trnava Region Location of Kátov in Slovakia
- Coordinates: 48.83°N 17.17°E
- Country: Slovakia
- Region: Trnava Region
- District: Skalica District
- First mentioned: 1452

Area
  - Total: 4.39 km^{2} (1.69 sq mi)
- Elevation: 164 m (538 ft)

Population (2025)
  - Total: 627
- Time zone: UTC+1 (CET)
  - Summer (DST): UTC+2 (CEST)
- Postal code: 908 49
- Area code: +421 34
- Vehicle registration plate (until 2022): SI
- Website: www.katov.eu

Kátov (Hungarian: Kátó) is a village and municipality in Skalica District in the Trnava Region of western Slovakia.

== History ==
In historical records the village was first mentioned in 1452.

== Geography ==
The municipality lies at an altitude of 164 metres (538 ft) and covers an area of 4.39 km^{2} (1.69 sq mi) (2025).

== Population ==
Population statistic (10 years)
Year	1995	2005	2015	2025
Count	543	586	636	627
Difference		+7.91%	+8.53%	−1.41%

Population statistic
Year	2024	2025
Count	624	627
Difference		+0.48%

It has a population of 627 people (31 December 2025).

=== Ethnicity ===
Census 2021 (1+ %)
Ethnicity	Number	Fraction
Slovak	604	96.79%
Czech	21	3.36%
Not found out	8	1.28%
Total	624	

In year 2021 was 624 people by ethnicity 604 as Slovak, 21 as Czech, 8 as Not found out, 4 as Russian, 2 as Romanian, 2 as Hungarian, 1 as Ukrainian, 1 as Romani, 1 as Polish, 1 as Moravian, 1 as Other and 1 as English.

Note on population: The difference values of population numbers in the table "Population statistic" and in the sections "Ethnicity" & "Religion" is caused by the use of various statistical methods.

=== Religion ===
Census 2021 (1+ %)
Religion	Number	Fraction
Roman Catholic Church	352	56.41%
None	185	29.65%
Evangelical Church	53	8.49%
Not found out	23	3.69%
Total	624	

In year 2021 was 624 people by religion 352 from Roman Catholic Church, 185 from None, 53 from Evangelical Church, 23 from Not found out, 2 from Calvinist Church, 2 from Other and not ascertained christian church, 2 from Other, 1 from Christian Congregations in Slovakia, 1 from Islam, 1 from Greek Catholic Church, 1 from United Methodist Church and 1 from Buddhism.

== Genealogical resources ==
The records for genealogical research are available at the state archive "Statny Archiv in Bratislava, Slovakia"

- Roman Catholic church records (births/marriages/deaths): 1678-1922 (parish B)
- Lutheran church records (births/marriages/deaths): 1786-1895 (parish B)

== See also ==
- List of municipalities and towns in Slovakia
