= Radimov =

- Municipality
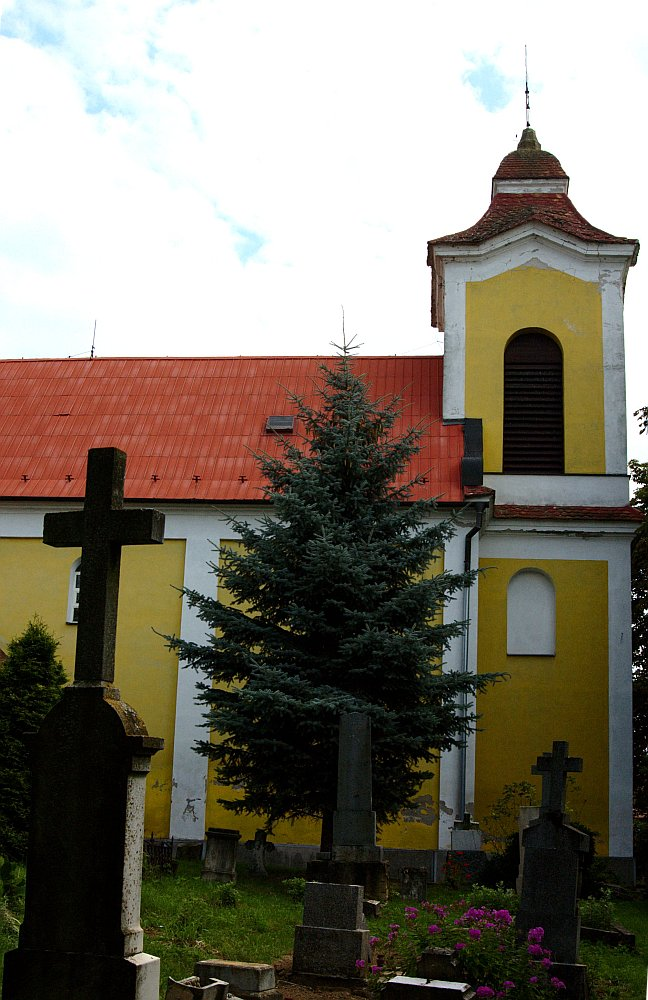
- Church of Saint Susanna

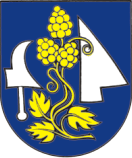
- Flag Coat of arms

- Location of Radimov in the Trnava Region Location of Radimov in Slovakia
- Coordinates: 48.75°N 17.20°E
- Country: Slovakia
- Region: Trnava Region
- District: Skalica District
- First mentioned: 1392

Area
  - Total: 12.83 km^{2} (4.95 sq mi)
- Elevation: 256 m (840 ft)

Population (2025)
  - Total: 501
- Time zone: UTC+1 (CET)
  - Summer (DST): UTC+2 (CEST)
- Postal code: 908 47
- Area code: +421 34
- Vehicle registration plate (until 2022): SI
- Website: www.radimov.sk

Radimov (Hungarian: Radimó) is a village and municipality in Skalica District in the Trnava Region of western Slovakia.

== History ==
In historical records the village was first mentioned in 1392.

== Geography ==
The municipality lies at an altitude of 256 metres (840 ft) and covers an area of 12.83 km^{2} (4.95 sq mi) (2025).

== Population ==
Population statistic (10 years)
Year	1995	2005	2015	2025
Count	589	590	573	501
Difference		+0.16%	−2.88%	−12.56%

Population statistic
Year	2024	2025
Count	507	501
Difference		−1.18%

It has a population of 501 people (31 December 2025).

=== Ethnicity ===
Census 2021 (1+ %)
Ethnicity	Number	Fraction
Slovak	529	98.87%
Not found out	6	1.12%
Total	535	

In year 2021 was 535 people by ethnicity 529 as Slovak, 6 as Not found out, 5 as Czech and 2 as Russian.

Note on population: The difference values of population numbers in the table "Population statistic" and in the sections "Ethnicity" & "Religion" is caused by the use of various statistical methods.

=== Religion ===
Census 2021 (1+ %)
Religion	Number	Fraction
Roman Catholic Church	414	77.38%
None	91	17.01%
Not found out	11	2.06%
Evangelical Church	8	1.5%
Total	535	

In year 2021 was 535 people by religion 414 from Roman Catholic Church, 91 from None, 11 from Not found out, 8 from Evangelical Church, 3 from Other, 3 from Greek Catholic Church, 2 from Buddhism, 2 from Ad hoc movements and 1 from Christian Congregations in Slovakia.
