= Bžany =

Bžany may refer to places:

- Bžany, Stropkov District, a municipality and village in Slovakia
- Bžany (Teplice District), a municipality and village in the Czech Republic
