= Gribov (disambiguation) =

- Gribov, a village in Slovakia.
- Alexey Gribov, Russian actor
- Boris Gribov, Russian chemist
- Vladimir Gribov, Russian theoretical physicist
- Gribov ambiguity, an issue in theoretical physics named after Vladimir Gribov
- Gribov Medal, a physics award named after Vladimir Gribov

== See also ==
- Gribow, a municipality in Germany
