= Breznička, Stropkov District =

Breznička
- Municipality
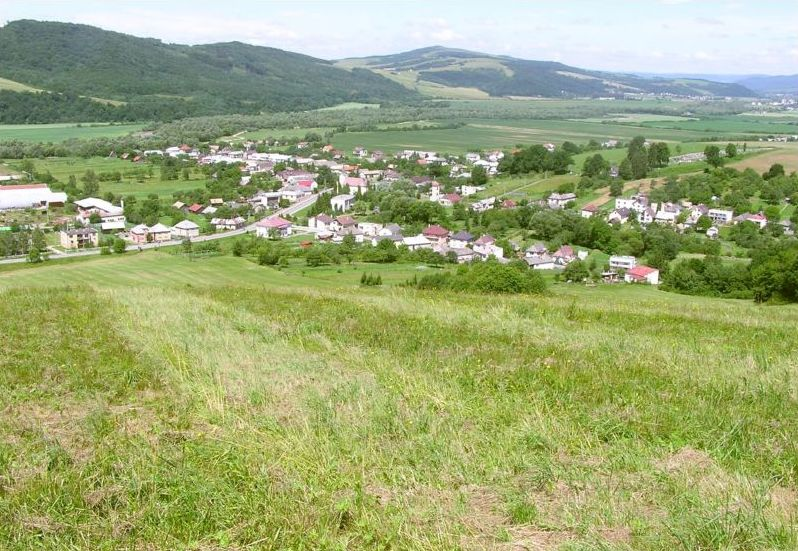

- Flag

- Location of Breznička in the Prešov Region Location of Breznička in Slovakia
- Coordinates: 49.22°N 21.70°E
- Country: Slovakia
- Region: Prešov Region
- District: Stropkov District
- First mentioned: 1430

Area
  - Total: 5.83 km^{2} (2.25 sq mi)
- Elevation: 235 m (771 ft)

Population (2025)
  - Total: 130
- Time zone: UTC+1 (CET)
  - Summer (DST): UTC+2 (CEST)
- Postal code: 910 1
- Area code: +421 54
- Vehicle registration plate (until 2022): SP
- Website: www.breznicka-sp.sk

Breznička (Rusyn: Бережничка; Hungarian: Kisberezsnye) is a village and municipality in Stropkov District in the Prešov Region of north-eastern Slovakia.

== History ==
In historical records the village was first mentioned in 1430.

== Geography ==
The municipality lies at an altitude of 235 metres (771 ft) and covers an area of 5.83 km^{2} (2.25 sq mi) (2025).

== Population ==
Population statistic (10 years)
Year	1995	2005	2015	2025
Count	133	120	121	130
Difference		−9.77%	+0.83%	+7.43%

Population statistic
Year	2024	2025
Count	131	130
Difference		−0.76%

It has a population of 130 people (31 December 2025).

=== Ethnicity ===
Census 2021 (1+ %)
Ethnicity	Number	Fraction
Slovak	115	90.55%
Rusyn	44	34.64%
Romani	3	2.36%
Total	127	

In year 2021 was 127 people by ethnicity 115 as Slovak, 44 as Rusyn, 3 as Romani and 1 as Not found out.

Note on population: The difference values of population numbers in the table "Population statistic" and in the sections "Ethnicity" & "Religion" is caused by the use of various statistical methods.

=== Religion ===
Census 2021 (1+ %)
Religion	Number	Fraction
Greek Catholic Church	107	84.25%
Eastern Orthodox Church	8	6.3%
None	7	5.51%
Roman Catholic Church	5	3.94%
Total	127	

In year 2021 was 127 people by religion 107 from Greek Catholic Church, 8 from Eastern Orthodox Church, 7 from None and 5 from Roman Catholic Church.

== Religion ==
According to the 2001 census, 93.3% were Greek Catholic, 4.5% Orthodox and 2.2% Roman Catholic.

== Genealogical resources ==
The records for genealogical research are available at the state archive "Statny Archiv in Presov, Slovakia"

== See also ==
- List of municipalities and towns in Slovakia
