= Stropkov District =

Coordinates: 49°12′9″N 21°39′7″E

- District
- Country: Slovakia
- Region (kraj): Prešov Region
- Seat: Stropkov

Area
  - Total: 388.92 km^{2} (150.16 sq mi)

Population (2025)
  - Total: 19,314
- Time zone: UTC+1 (CET)
  - Summer (DST): UTC+2 (CEST)
- Telephone prefix: 054
- Vehicle registration plate (until 2022): SP
- Municipalities: 43

Stropkov District (Slovak: okres Stropkov) is a district in the Prešov Region of eastern Slovakia. Until 1918, the district was mostly part of the county of Kingdom of Hungary of Zemplín, apart from an area in the north west around Duplín, Tisinec, Krušinec, Výškovce, Vislava, Oľšavka, Gribov and Kožuchovce which formed part of the county of Šariš.

== Population ==
Population statistic (10 years)
Year	1995	2005	2015	2025
Count	20,328	20,862	20,630	19,314
Difference		+2.62%	−1.11%	−6.37%

Population statistic
Year	2024	2025
Count	19,414	19,314
Difference		−0.51%

It has a population of 19,314 people (31 December 2025).

Historical population
Year	Pop.	±%
1970	18,123	—
1980	19,064	+5.2%
1991	20,098	+5.4%
2001	21,027	+4.6%
2011	20,931	−0.5%
2021	19,878	−5.0%
Source: Statistical Office of the Slovak Republic

=== Ethnicity ===
Census 2021 (1+ %)
Ethnicity	Number	Fraction
Slovak	17,422	75.51%
Rusyn	3066	13.29%
Not found out	1255	5.44%
Romani	931	4.03%
Total	23,070	

In year 2021 was 23,070 people by ethnicity 17,422 as Slovak, 3066 as Rusyn, 1255 as Not found out, 931 as Romani, 108 as Czech, 102 as Ukrainian, 52 as Other, 30 as Russian, 29 as Polish, 23 as Hungarian, 12 as English, 6 as Italian, 6 as Romanian, 6 as German, 4 as Vietnamese, 4 as Serbian, 3 as Irish, 3 as Albanian, 2 as Austrian, 2 as Korean, 1 as Moravian, 1 as Canadian, 1 as Croatian and 1 as Bulgarian.

Note on population: The difference values of population numbers in the table "Population statistic" and in the sections "Ethnicity" & "Religion" is caused by the use of various statistical methods.

=== Religion ===
Census 2021 (1+ %)
Religion	Number	Fraction
Roman Catholic Church	8526	42.89%
Greek Catholic Church	7567	38.07%
Not found out	1196	6.02%
Eastern Orthodox Church	1194	6.01%
None	1139	5.73%
Total	19,878	

In year 2021 was 19,878 people by religion 8526 from Roman Catholic Church, 7567 from Greek Catholic Church, 1196 from Not found out, 1194 from Eastern Orthodox Church, 1139 from None, 59 from Evangelical Church, 44 from Ad hoc movements, 30 from Jehovah's Witnesses, 23 from Other, 21 from Calvinist Church, 16 from Islam, 14 from Christian Congregations in Slovakia, 14 from Buddhism, 11 from Other and not ascertained christian church, 6 from Paganism and natural spirituality, 5 from Apostolic Church, 4 from Old Catholic Church, 2 from Church of the Brethren, 2 from Baptists Church, 1 from New Apostolic Church, 1 from Hinduism, 1 from Czechoslovak Hussite Church, 1 from Seventh-day Adventist Church and 1 from Bahá'i Community.

== Municipalities ==
Municipality	Area [km^{2}]	Population
Baňa	1.91	201
Breznica	9.93	852
Breznička	5.83	130
Brusnica	14.28	292
Bukovce	11.06	541
Bystrá	3.01	15
Bžany	17.06	221
Duplín	9.03	510
Gribov	7.94	187
Havaj	14.25	387
Chotča	10.58	646
Jakušovce	5.50	30
Kolbovce	9.43	187
Korunková	11.21	63
Kožuchovce	6.14	45
Krišlovce	4.37	27
Kručov	8.21	199
Krušinec	2.61	229
Lomné	7.46	230
Makovce	4.56	142
Malá Poľana	10.94	96
Miková	12.71	131
Miňovce	6.00	339
Mrázovce	4.65	76
Nižná Olšava	11.40	432
Oľšavka	8.53	164
Potôčky	3.55	71
Potoky	5.58	84
Soľník	4.40	32
Staškovce	8.45	235
Stropkov	24.66	9,660
Šandal	10.88	314
Tisinec	3.75	487
Tokajík	8.24	90
Turany nad Ondavou	9.59	337
Varechovce	10.58	132
Veľkrop	10.44	233
Vislava	10.96	183
Vladiča	26.98	63
Vojtovce	4.91	98
Vyškovce	6.62	117
Vyšná Olšava	13.77	622
Vyšný Hrabovec	6.71	184

Population and area values are current for year 2025.
