= Baňa =

- Municipality
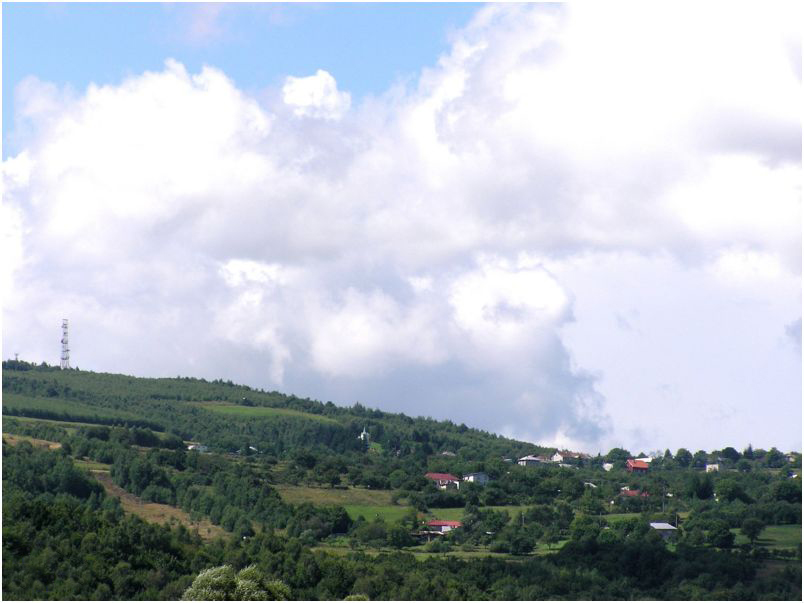

- Flag

- Location of Baňa in the Prešov Region Location of Baňa in Slovakia
- Coordinates: 49.22°N 21.61°E
- Country: Slovakia
- Region: Prešov Region
- District: Stropkov District
- First mentioned: 1957

Area
  - Total: 1.91 km^{2} (0.74 sq mi)
- Elevation: 413 m (1,355 ft)

Population (2025)
  - Total: 201
- Time zone: UTC+1 (CET)
  - Summer (DST): UTC+2 (CEST)
- Postal code: 910 1
- Area code: +421 54
- Vehicle registration plate (until 2022): SP
- Website: obecbana.sk

Baňa (Hungarian: Boksabánya) is a village and municipality in the Stropkov District in the Prešov Region of north-eastern Slovakia.

== History ==
In historical records the village was first mentioned in 1957.

== Geography ==
The municipality lies at an altitude of 413 metres (1,355 ft) and covers an area of 1.91 km^{2} (0.74 sq mi) (2025).

== Population ==
Population statistic (10 years)
Year	1995	2005	2015	2025
Count	201	189	172	201
Difference		−5.97%	−8.99%	+16.86%

Population statistic
Year	2024	2025
Count	202	201
Difference		−0.49%

It has a population of 201 people (31 December 2025).

=== Ethnicity ===
Census 2021 (1+ %)
Ethnicity	Number	Fraction
Slovak	178	95.18%
Rusyn	9	4.81%
Czech	5	2.67%
Not found out	5	2.67%
German	2	1.06%
Total	187	

In year 2021 was 187 people by ethnicity 178 as Slovak, 9 as Rusyn, 5 as Czech, 5 as Not found out, 2 as German, 1 as Polish, 1 as Other and 1 as Croatian.

Note on population: The difference values of population numbers in the table "Population statistic" and in the sections "Ethnicity" & "Religion" is caused by the use of various statistical methods.

=== Religion ===
Census 2021 (1+ %)
Religion	Number	Fraction
Roman Catholic Church	145	77.54%
Greek Catholic Church	16	8.56%
None	16	8.56%
Not found out	7	3.74%
Eastern Orthodox Church	3	1.6%
Total	187	

In year 2021 was 187 people by religion 145 from Roman Catholic Church, 16 from Greek Catholic Church, 16 from None, 7 from Not found out and 3 from Eastern Orthodox Church.

== Ethnicity ==
According to the 2001 Census, 100.0% were Slovak.

== Religion ==
According to the 2001 Census, 95.5% were Roman Catholic, 3.0% Greek Catholic and 1.0% Orthodox. 0.5% did not belong to any denomination.
