= Vyšný Hrabovec =

- Municipality
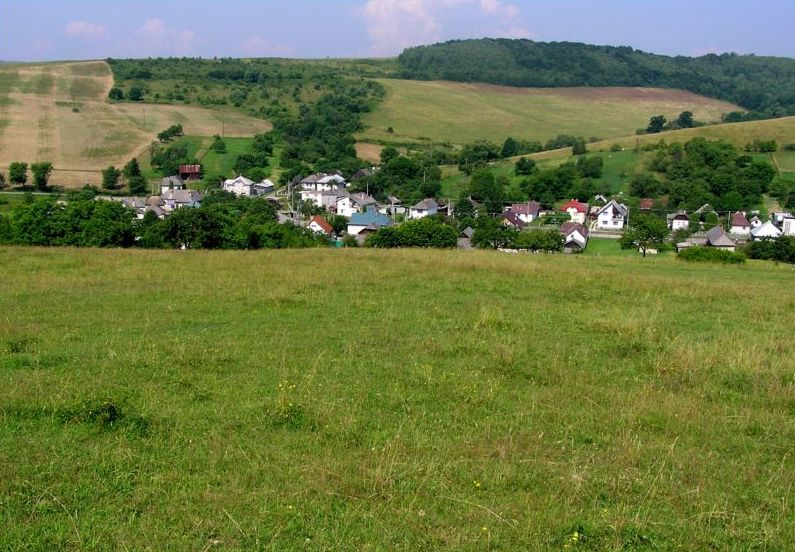

- Flag

- Location of Vyšný Hrabovec in the Prešov Region Location of Vyšný Hrabovec in Slovakia
- Coordinates: 49.08°N 21.70°E
- Country: Slovakia
- Region: Prešov Region
- District: Stropkov District
- First mentioned: 1408

Area
  - Total: 6.71 km^{2} (2.59 sq mi)
- Elevation: 176 m (577 ft)

Population (2025)
  - Total: 184
- Time zone: UTC+1 (CET)
  - Summer (DST): UTC+2 (CEST)
- Postal code: 903 4
- Area code: +421 54
- Vehicle registration plate (until 2022): SP

Vyšný Hrabovec is a village and municipality in Stropkov District in the Prešov Region of north-eastern Slovakia.

== History ==
In historical records the village was first mentioned in 1408.

== Geography ==
The municipality lies at an altitude of 176 metres (577 ft) and covers an area of 6.71 km^{2} (2.59 sq mi) (2025).

== Population ==
Population statistic (10 years)
Year	1995	2005	2015	2025
Count	198	200	185	184
Difference		+1.01%	−7.5%	−0.54%

Population statistic
Year	2024	2025
Count	188	184
Difference		−2.12%

It has a population of 184 people (31 December 2025).

=== Ethnicity ===
Census 2021 (1+ %)
Ethnicity	Number	Fraction
Slovak	192	97.46%
Romani	28	14.21%
Rusyn	9	4.56%
Not found out	4	2.03%
Czech	2	1.01%
Other	2	1.01%
Total	197	

In year 2021 was 197 people by ethnicity 192 as Slovak, 28 as Romani, 9 as Rusyn, 4 as Not found out, 2 as Czech and 2 as Other.

Note on population: The difference values of population numbers in the table "Population statistic" and in the sections "Ethnicity" & "Religion" is caused by the use of various statistical methods.

=== Religion ===
Census 2021 (1+ %)
Religion	Number	Fraction
Roman Catholic Church	96	48.73%
Greek Catholic Church	87	44.16%
None	6	3.05%
Not found out	3	1.52%
Islam	3	1.52%
Total	197	

In year 2021 was 197 people by religion 96 from Roman Catholic Church, 87 from Greek Catholic Church, 6 from None, 3 from Not found out, 3 from Islam, 1 from Eastern Orthodox Church and 1 from Evangelical Church.
