= Vojtovce =

- Municipality
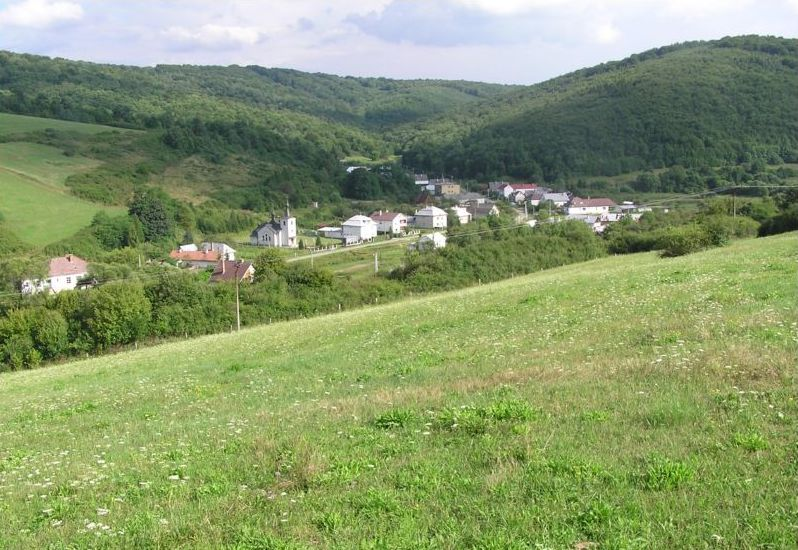

- Flag

- Location of Vojtovce in the Prešov Region Location of Vojtovce in Slovakia
- Coordinates: 49.20°N 21.68°E
- Country: Slovakia
- Region: Prešov Region
- District: Stropkov District
- First mentioned: 1408

Area
  - Total: 4.91 km^{2} (1.90 sq mi)
- Elevation: 211 m (692 ft)

Population (2025)
  - Total: 98
- Time zone: UTC+1 (CET)
  - Summer (DST): UTC+2 (CEST)
- Postal code: 910 1
- Area code: +421 54
- Vehicle registration plate (until 2022): SP
- Website: www.vojtovce.dcom.sk

Vojtovce (Rusyn: Війтївцї; Hungarian: Vojtvágása) is a village and municipality in Stropkov District in the Prešov Region of north-eastern Slovakia.

== History ==
In historical records the village was first mentioned in 1408.

== Geography ==
The municipality lies at an altitude of 211 metres (692 ft) and covers an area of 4.91 km^{2} (1.90 sq mi) (2025).

== Population ==
Population statistic (10 years)
Year	1995	2005	2015	2025
Count	126	118	109	98
Difference		−6.34%	−7.62%	−10.09%

Population statistic
Year	2024	2025
Count	102	98
Difference		−3.92%

It has a population of 98 people (31 December 2025).

=== Ethnicity ===
Census 2021 (1+ %)
Ethnicity	Number	Fraction
Slovak	79	80.61%
Rusyn	39	39.79%
Not found out	4	4.08%
Czech	2	2.04%
Ukrainian	2	2.04%
Total	98	

In year 2021 was 98 people by ethnicity 79 as Slovak, 39 as Rusyn, 4 as Not found out, 2 as Czech and 2 as Ukrainian.

Note on population: The difference values of population numbers in the table "Population statistic" and in the sections "Ethnicity" & "Religion" is caused by the use of various statistical methods.

=== Religion ===
Census 2021 (1+ %)
Religion	Number	Fraction
Greek Catholic Church	39	39.8%
Eastern Orthodox Church	35	35.71%
None	9	9.18%
Roman Catholic Church	8	8.16%
Not found out	5	5.1%
Buddhism	1	1.02%
Ad hoc movements	1	1.02%
Total	98	

In year 2021 was 98 people by religion 39 from Greek Catholic Church, 35 from Eastern Orthodox Church, 9 from None, 8 from Roman Catholic Church, 5 from Not found out, 1 from Buddhism and 1 from Ad hoc movements.
