= Jakušovce =

- Municipality
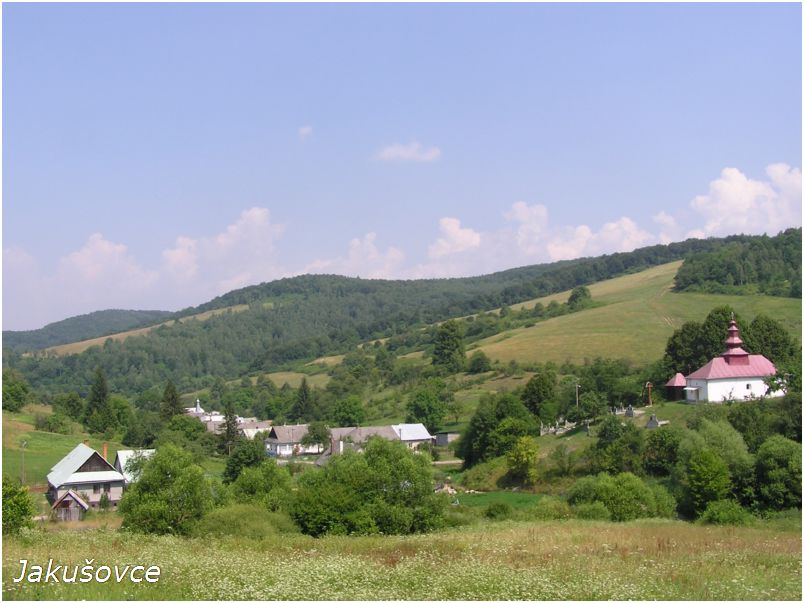

- Flag

- Location of Jakušovce in the Prešov Region Location of Jakušovce in Slovakia
- Coordinates: 49.15°N 21.77°E
- Country: Slovakia
- Region: Prešov Region
- District: Stropkov District
- First mentioned: 1454

Government
  - Mayor: Emília Kasardová (HLAS–SD)

Area
  - Total: 5.50 km^{2} (2.12 sq mi)
- Elevation: 265 m (869 ft)

Population (2025)
  - Total: 30
- Time zone: UTC+1 (CET)
  - Summer (DST): UTC+2 (CEST)
- Postal code: 903 1
- Area code: +421 54
- Vehicle registration plate (until 2022): SP
- Website: www.jakusovce.sk

Jakušovce (Rusyn: Якушівцї; Hungarian: Jakabvölgye) is a village and municipality in Stropkov District in the Prešov Region of north-eastern Slovakia.

== History ==
In historical records the village was first mentioned in 1454.

== Geography ==
The municipality lies at an altitude of 265 metres (869 ft) and covers an area of 5.50 km^{2} (2.12 sq mi) (2025).

== Population ==
Population statistic (10 years)
Year	1995	2005	2015	2025
Count	52	49	44	30
Difference		−5.76%	−10.20%	−31.81%

Population statistic
Year	2024	2025
Count	29	30
Difference		+3.44%

It has a population of 30 people (31 December 2025).

=== Ethnicity ===
Census 2021 (1+ %)
Ethnicity	Number	Fraction
Rusyn	24	60%
Slovak	21	52.5%
Czech	1	2.5%
Total	40	

In year 2021 was 40 people by ethnicity 24 as Rusyn, 21 as Slovak and 1 as Czech.

Note on population: The difference values of population numbers in the table "Population statistic" and in the sections "Ethnicity" & "Religion" is caused by the use of various statistical methods.

=== Religion ===
Census 2021 (1+ %)
Religion	Number	Fraction
Eastern Orthodox Church	18	45%
Greek Catholic Church	15	37.5%
Roman Catholic Church	5	12.5%
None	2	5%
Total	40	

In year 2021 was 40 people by religion 18 from Eastern Orthodox Church, 15 from Greek Catholic Church, 5 from Roman Catholic Church and 2 from None.
