= Duplín =

- Municipality
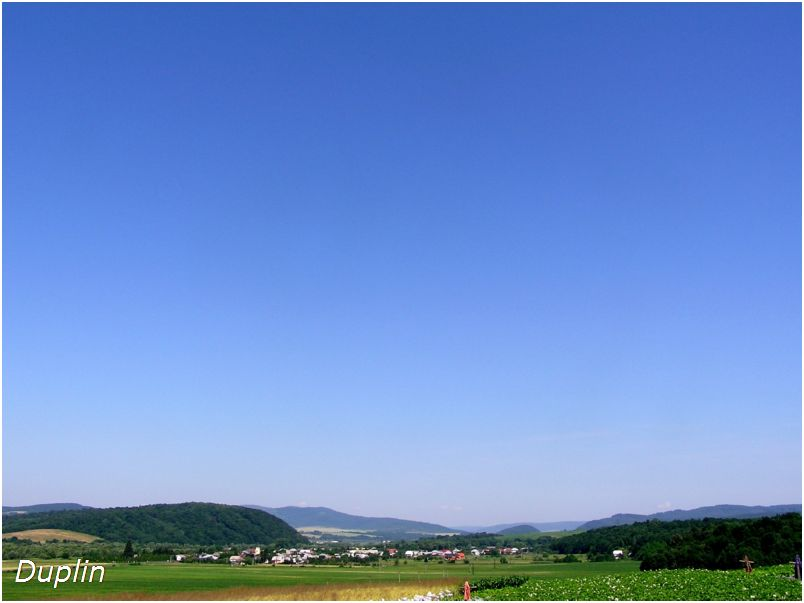

- Flag

- Location of Duplín in the Prešov Region Location of Duplín in Slovakia
- Coordinates: 49.23°N 21.63°E
- Country: Slovakia
- Region: Prešov Region
- District: Stropkov District
- First mentioned: 1379

Area
  - Total: 9.03 km^{2} (3.49 sq mi)
- Elevation: 195 m (640 ft)

Population (2025)
  - Total: 510
- Time zone: UTC+1 (CET)
  - Summer (DST): UTC+2 (CEST)
- Postal code: 910 1
- Area code: +421 54
- Vehicle registration plate (until 2022): SP
- Website: duplin.sk

Duplín (Hungarian: Bányavölgy; Rusyn: Дуплін) is a village and municipality in Stropkov District in the 'Prešov Region of north-eastern Slovakia.

== History ==
In historical records the village was first mentioned in 1379.

== Geography ==
The municipality lies at an altitude of 195 metres (640 ft) and covers an area of 9.03 km^{2} (3.49 sq mi) (2025).

== Population ==
Population statistic (10 years)
Year	1995	2005	2015	2025
Count	493	451	530	510
Difference		−8.51%	+17.51%	−3.77%

Population statistic
Year	2024	2025
Count	514	510
Difference		−0.77%

It has a population of 510 people (31 December 2025).

=== Ethnicity ===
Census 2021 (1+ %)
Ethnicity	Number	Fraction
Slovak	499	98.03%
Rusyn	32	6.28%
Not found out	10	1.96%
Total	509	

In year 2021 was 509 people by ethnicity 499 as Slovak, 32 as Rusyn, 10 as Not found out, 3 as Ukrainian, 2 as Czech, 2 as English, 1 as Romani, 1 as Polish and 1 as Hungarian.

Note on population: The difference values of population numbers in the table "Population statistic" and in the sections "Ethnicity" & "Religion" is caused by the use of various statistical methods.

=== Religion ===
Census 2021 (1+ %)
Religion	Number	Fraction
Roman Catholic Church	359	70.53%
Greek Catholic Church	93	18.27%
None	43	8.45%
Eastern Orthodox Church	6	1.18%
Total	509	

In year 2021 was 509 people by religion 359 from Roman Catholic Church, 93 from Greek Catholic Church, 43 from None, 6 from Eastern Orthodox Church, 3 from Jehovah's Witnesses, 3 from Evangelical Church and 2 from Not found out.
