= Lomné =

- Municipality
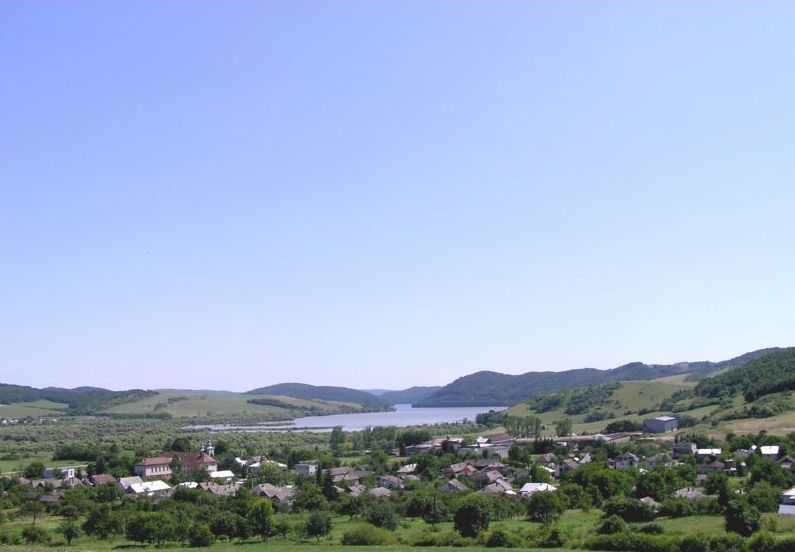

- Flag

- Location of Lomné in the Prešov Region Location of Lomné in Slovakia
- Coordinates: 49.10°N 21.63°E
- Country: Slovakia
- Region: Prešov Region
- District: Stropkov District
- First mentioned: 1369

Area
  - Total: 7.46 km^{2} (2.88 sq mi)
- Elevation: 170 m (560 ft)

Population (2025)
  - Total: 230
- Time zone: UTC+1 (CET)
  - Summer (DST): UTC+2 (CEST)
- Postal code: 903 3
- Area code: +421 54
- Vehicle registration plate (until 2022): SP
- Website: www.lomne.sk

Lomné (Hungarian: Lomna) is a village and municipality in Stropkov District in the Prešov Region of north-eastern Slovakia.

== History ==
In historical records the village was first mentioned in 1369.

== Geography ==
The municipality lies at an altitude of 170 metres (560 ft) and covers an area of 7.46 km^{2} (2.88 sq mi) (2025).

== Population ==
Population statistic (10 years)
Year	1995	2005	2015	2025
Count	315	275	248	230
Difference		−12.69%	−9.81%	−7.25%

Population statistic
Year	2024	2025
Count	233	230
Difference		−1.28%

It has a population of 230 people (31 December 2025).

=== Ethnicity ===
Census 2021 (1+ %)
Ethnicity	Number	Fraction
Slovak	226	95.76%
Rusyn	75	31.77%
Czech	4	1.69%
Not found out	4	1.69%
Total	236	

In year 2021 was 236 people by ethnicity 226 as Slovak, 75 as Rusyn, 4 as Czech, 4 as Not found out and 1 as Romani.

Note on population: The difference values of population numbers in the table "Population statistic" and in the sections "Ethnicity" & "Religion" is caused by the use of various statistical methods.

=== Religion ===
Census 2021 (1+ %)
Religion	Number	Fraction
Greek Catholic Church	144	61.02%
Roman Catholic Church	49	20.76%
Eastern Orthodox Church	28	11.86%
None	9	3.81%
Not found out	4	1.69%
Total	236	

In year 2021 was 236 people by religion 144 from Greek Catholic Church, 49 from Roman Catholic Church, 28 from Eastern Orthodox Church, 9 from None, 4 from Not found out, 1 from Islam and 1 from Ad hoc movements.
