= Korunková =

- Municipality
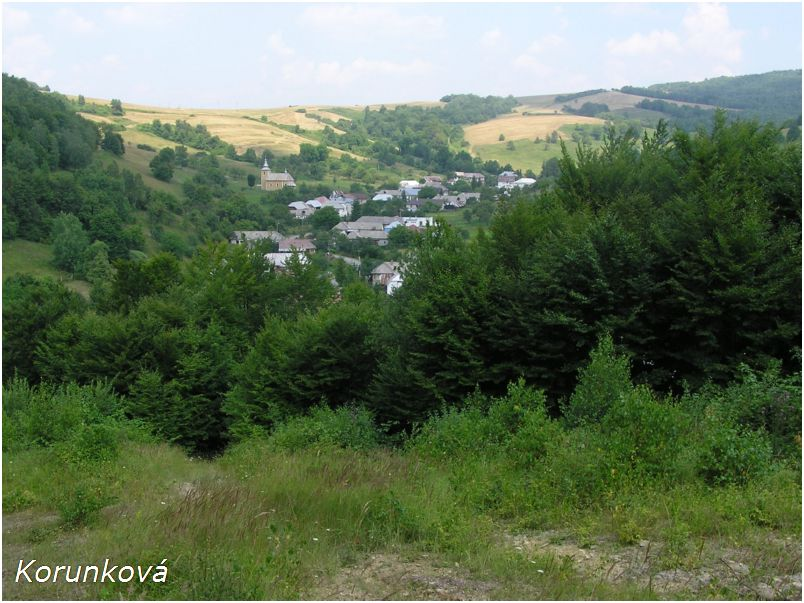

- Flag

- Location of Korunková in the Prešov Region Location of Korunková in Slovakia
- Coordinates: 49.20°N 21.75°E
- Country: Slovakia
- Region: Prešov Region
- District: Stropkov District
- First mentioned: 1408

Area
  - Total: 11.21 km^{2} (4.33 sq mi)
- Elevation: 263 m (863 ft)

Population (2025)
  - Total: 63
- Time zone: UTC+1 (CET)
  - Summer (DST): UTC+2 (CEST)
- Postal code: 903 1
- Area code: +421 54
- Vehicle registration plate (until 2022): SP
- Website: www.korunkova.sk

Korunková (Rusyn: Корунків; Hungarian: Pusztaháza) is a village and municipality in Stropkov District in the Prešov Region of north-eastern Slovakia.

== History ==
In historical records the village was first mentioned in 1408.

== Geography ==
The municipality lies at an altitude of 263 metres (863 ft) and covers an area of 11.21 km^{2} (4.33 sq mi) (2025).

== Population ==
Population statistic (10 years)
| Year | 1995 | 2005 | 2015 | 2025 |
|---|---|---|---|---|
| Count | 119 | 93 | 91 | 63 |
| Difference | | −21.84% | −2.15% | −30.76% |

Population statistic
| Year | 2024 | 2025 |
|---|---|---|
| Count | 59 | 63 |
| Difference | | +6.77% |

It has a population of 63 people (31 December 2025).

=== Ethnicity ===
Census 2021 (1+ %)
| Ethnicity | Number | Fraction |
|---|---|---|
| Slovak | 66 | 86.84% |
| Rusyn | 32 | 42.1% |
| Not found out | 2 | 2.63% |
| Czech | 1 | 1.31% |
| Total | 76 | |

In year 2021 was 76 people by ethnicity 66 as Slovak, 32 as Rusyn, 2 as Not found out and 1 as Czech.

Note on population: The difference values of population numbers in the table "Population statistic" and in the sections "Ethnicity" & "Religion" is caused by the use of various statistical methods.

=== Religion ===
Census 2021 (1+ %)
| Religion | Number | Fraction |
|---|---|---|
| Greek Catholic Church | 65 | 85.53% |
| Roman Catholic Church | 6 | 7.89% |
| Not found out | 2 | 2.63% |
| Christian Congregations in Slovakia | 2 | 2.63% |
| None | 1 | 1.32% |
| Total | 76 | |

In year 2021 was 76 people by religion 65 from Greek Catholic Church, 6 from Roman Catholic Church, 2 from Not found out, 2 from Christian Congregations in Slovakia and 1 from None.
