= Mrázovce =

- Municipality
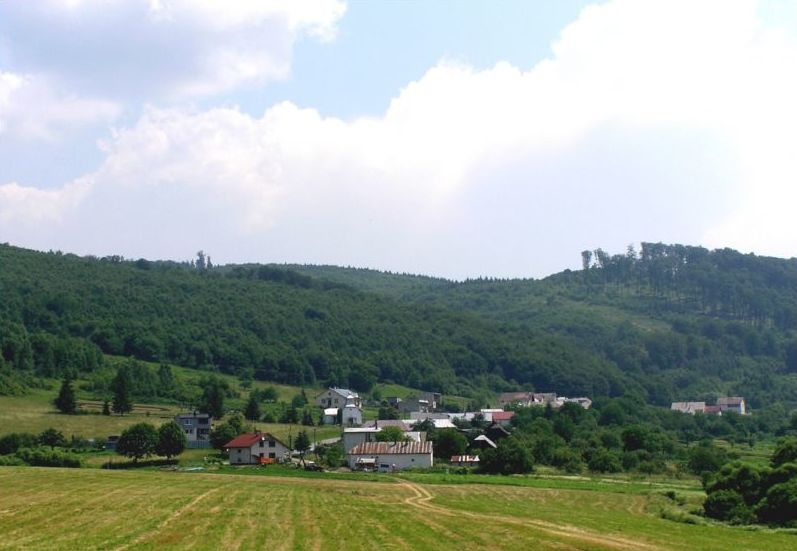

- Flag

- Location of Mrázovce in the Prešov Region Location of Mrázovce in Slovakia
- Coordinates: 49.12°N 21.68°E
- Country: Slovakia
- Region: Prešov Region
- District: Stropkov District
- First mentioned: 1408

Area
  - Total: 4.65 km^{2} (1.80 sq mi)
- Elevation: 231 m (758 ft)

Population (2025)
  - Total: 76
- Time zone: UTC+1 (CET)
  - Summer (DST): UTC+2 (CEST)
- Postal code: 903 4
- Area code: +421 54
- Vehicle registration plate (until 2022): SP

Mrázovce (Hungarian: Dér) is a village and municipality in Stropkov District in the Prešov Region of north-eastern Slovakia.

== History ==
In historical records, the village was first mentioned in 1408.

== Geography ==
The municipality lies at an altitude of 231 metres (758 ft) and covers an area of 4.65 km^{2} (1.80 sq mi) (2025).

== Population ==
Population statistic (10 years)
Year	1995	2005	2015	2025
Count	92	100	84	76
Difference		+8.69%	−16%	−9.52%

Population statistic
Year	2024	2025
Count	79	76
Difference		−3.79%

It has a population of 76 people (31 December 2025).

=== Ethnicity ===
Census 2021 (1+ %)
Ethnicity	Number	Fraction
Slovak	79	97.53%
Rusyn	6	7.4%
Not found out	1	1.23%
Total	81	

In year 2021 was 81 people by ethnicity 79 as Slovak, 6 as Rusyn and 1 as Not found out.

Note on population: The difference values of population numbers in the table "Population statistic" and in the sections "Ethnicity" & "Religion" is caused by the use of various statistical methods.

=== Religion ===
Census 2021 (1+ %)
Religion	Number	Fraction
Greek Catholic Church	66	81.48%
Roman Catholic Church	14	17.28%
Not found out	1	1.23%
Total	81	

In year 2021 was 81 people by religion 66 from Greek Catholic Church, 14 from Roman Catholic Church and 1 from Not found out.
