= Miňovce =

- Municipality
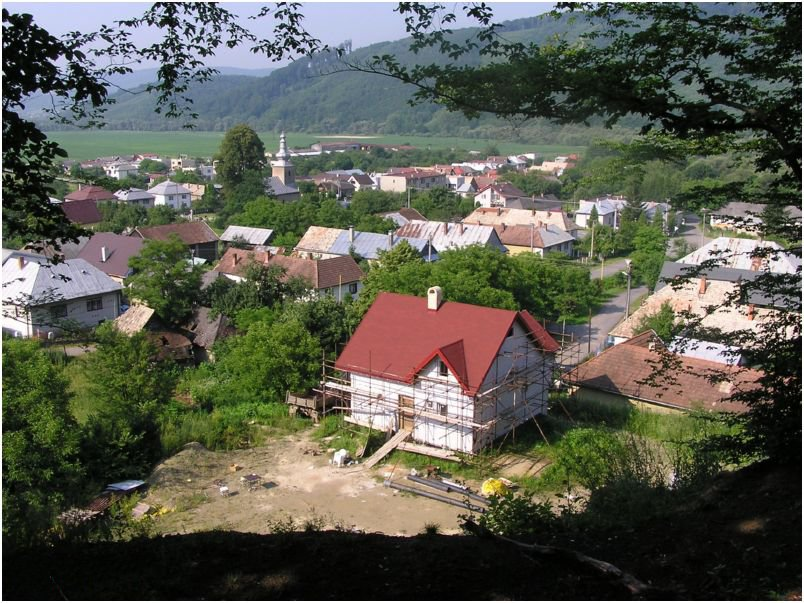

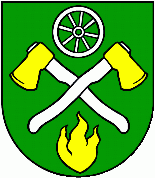
- Flag Coat of arms

- Location of Miňovce in the Prešov Region Location of Miňovce in Slovakia
- Coordinates: 49.13°N 21.65°E
- Country: Slovakia
- Region: Prešov Region
- District: Stropkov District
- First mentioned: 1430

Area
  - Total: 6.00 km^{2} (2.32 sq mi)
- Elevation: 168 m (551 ft)

Population (2025)
  - Total: 339
- Time zone: UTC+1 (CET)
  - Summer (DST): UTC+2 (CEST)
- Postal code: 903 2
- Area code: +421 54
- Vehicle registration plate (until 2022): SP
- Website: www.minovce.dcom.sk

Miňovce (Hungarian: Minyevágása) is a village and municipality in Stropkov District in the Prešov Region of north-eastern Slovakia.

== History ==
In historical records the village was first mentioned in 1430.

== Geography ==
The municipality lies at an altitude of 168 metres (551 ft) and covers an area of 6.00 km^{2} (2.32 sq mi) (2025).

== Population ==
Population statistic (10 years)
| Year | 1995 | 2005 | 2015 | 2025 |
|---|---|---|---|---|
| Count | 348 | 343 | 329 | 339 |
| Difference | | −1.43% | −4.08% | +3.03% |

Population statistic
| Year | 2024 | 2025 |
|---|---|---|
| Count | 338 | 339 |
| Difference | | +0.29% |

It has a population of 339 people (31 December 2025).

=== Ethnicity ===
Census 2021 (1+ %)
| Ethnicity | Number | Fraction |
|---|---|---|
| Slovak | 335 | 98.82% |
| Rusyn | 20 | 5.89% |
| Not found out | 5 | 1.47% |
| Total | 339 | |

In year 2021 was 339 people by ethnicity 335 as Slovak, 20 as Rusyn, 5 as Not found out, 2 as Czech, 1 as Polish and 1 as Hungarian.

Note on population: The difference values of population numbers in the table "Population statistic" and in the sections "Ethnicity" & "Religion" is caused by the use of various statistical methods.

=== Religion ===
Census 2021 (1+ %)
| Religion | Number | Fraction |
|---|---|---|
| Greek Catholic Church | 236 | 69.62% |
| Roman Catholic Church | 84 | 24.78% |
| None | 7 | 2.06% |
| Eastern Orthodox Church | 6 | 1.77% |
| Total | 339 | |

In year 2021 was 339 people by religion 236 from Greek Catholic Church, 84 from Roman Catholic Church, 7 from None, 6 from Eastern Orthodox Church, 2 from Not found out, 2 from Buddhism and 2 from Ad hoc movements.
