= Krušinec =

- Municipality
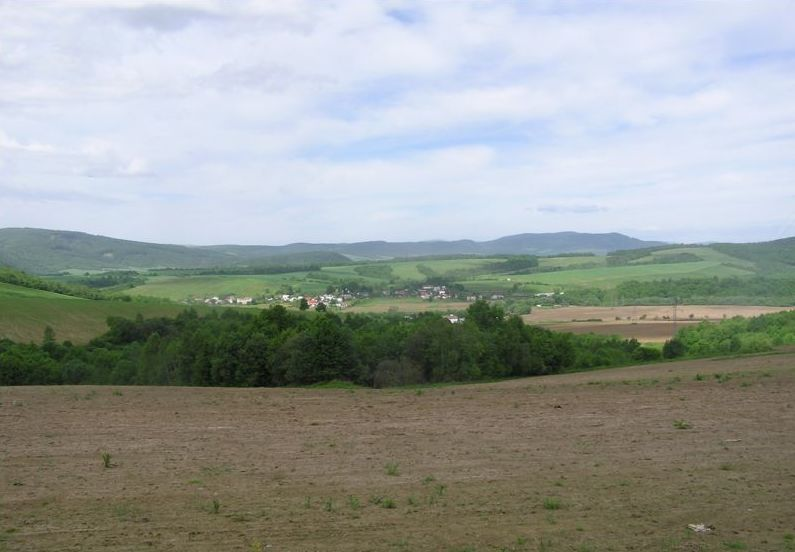

- Flag

- Location of Krušinec in the Prešov Region Location of Krušinec in Slovakia
- Coordinates: 49.23°N 21.67°E
- Country: Slovakia
- Region: Prešov Region
- District: Stropkov District
- First mentioned: 1543

Area
  - Total: 2.61 km^{2} (1.01 sq mi)
- Elevation: 204 m (669 ft)

Population (2025)
  - Total: 229
- Time zone: UTC+1 (CET)
  - Summer (DST): UTC+2 (CEST)
- Postal code: 910 1
- Area code: +421 54
- Vehicle registration plate (until 2022): SP
- Website: www.krusinec.dcom.sk

Krušinec (Hungarian: Körösény) is a village and municipality in Stropkov District in the 'Prešov Region of north-eastern Slovakia.

== History ==
In historical records the village was first mentioned in 1543.

== Geography ==
The municipality lies at an altitude of 204 metres (669 ft) and covers an area of 2.61 km^{2} (1.01 sq mi) (2025).

== Population ==
Population statistic (10 years)
| Year | 1995 | 2005 | 2015 | 2025 |
|---|---|---|---|---|
| Count | 214 | 258 | 253 | 229 |
| Difference | | +20.56% | −1.93% | −9.48% |

Population statistic
| Year | 2024 | 2025 |
|---|---|---|
| Count | 235 | 229 |
| Difference | | −2.55% |

It has a population of 229 people (31 December 2025).

=== Ethnicity ===
Census 2021 (1+ %)
| Ethnicity | Number | Fraction |
|---|---|---|
| Slovak | 221 | 92.85% |
| Rusyn | 34 | 14.28% |
| Not found out | 16 | 6.72% |
| Total | 238 | |

In year 2021 was 238 people by ethnicity 221 as Slovak, 34 as Rusyn, 16 as Not found out, 2 as Romani, 2 as Russian, 2 as Other and 1 as Ukrainian.

Note on population: The difference values of population numbers in the table "Population statistic" and in the sections "Ethnicity" & "Religion" is caused by the use of various statistical methods.

=== Religion ===
Census 2021 (1+ %)
| Religion | Number | Fraction |
|---|---|---|
| Greek Catholic Church | 171 | 71.85% |
| Roman Catholic Church | 41 | 17.23% |
| Not found out | 11 | 4.62% |
| None | 10 | 4.2% |
| Eastern Orthodox Church | 3 | 1.26% |
| Total | 238 | |

In year 2021 was 238 people by religion 171 from Greek Catholic Church, 41 from Roman Catholic Church, 11 from Not found out, 10 from None, 3 from Eastern Orthodox Church, 1 from Hinduism and 1 from Ad hoc movements.
