= Oľšavka, Stropkov District =

Oľšavka
- Municipality
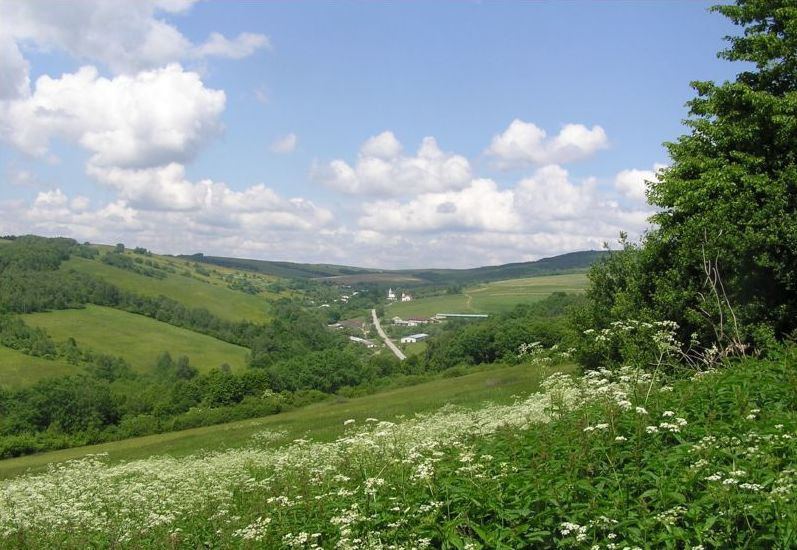

- Flag

- Location of Oľšavka in the Prešov Region Location of Oľšavka in Slovakia
- Coordinates: 49°17′32″N 21°41′15″E
- Country: Slovakia
- Region: Prešov Region
- District: Stropkov District
- First mentioned: 1551

Area
  - Total: 8.53 km^{2} (3.29 sq mi)
- Elevation: 286 m (938 ft)

Population (2025)
  - Total: 164
- Time zone: UTC+1 (CET)
  - Summer (DST): UTC+2 (CEST)
- Postal code: 902 2
- Area code: +421 54
- Vehicle registration plate (until 2022): SP
- Website: www.obec-olsavka.sk

Oľšavka (Rusyn: Вільшавка; Hungarian: Kisolysó) is a village and municipality in Stropkov District in the Prešov Region of north-eastern Slovakia.

== Population ==
Population statistic (10 years)
Year	1995	2005	2015	2025
Count	253	230	214	164
Difference		−9.09%	−6.95%	−23.36%

Population statistic
Year	2024	2025
Count	167	164
Difference		−1.79%

It has a population of 164 people (31 December 2025).

=== Ethnicity ===
Census 2021 (1+ %)
Ethnicity	Number	Fraction
Slovak	160	83.76%
Rusyn	101	52.87%
Not found out	9	4.71%
Czech	2	1.04%
Total	191	

In year 2021 was 191 people by ethnicity 160 as Slovak, 101 as Rusyn, 9 as Not found out, 2 as Czech and 1 as Ukrainian.

Note on population: The difference values of population numbers in the table "Population statistic" and in the sections "Ethnicity" & "Religion" is caused by the use of various statistical methods.

=== Religion ===
Census 2021 (1+ %)
Religion	Number	Fraction
Greek Catholic Church	99	51.83%
Eastern Orthodox Church	63	32.98%
Roman Catholic Church	16	8.38%
Not found out	8	4.19%
None	5	2.62%
Total	191	

In year 2021 was 191 people by religion 99 from Greek Catholic Church, 63 from Eastern Orthodox Church, 16 from Roman Catholic Church, 8 from Not found out and 5 from None.
