= Kolbovce =

- Municipality
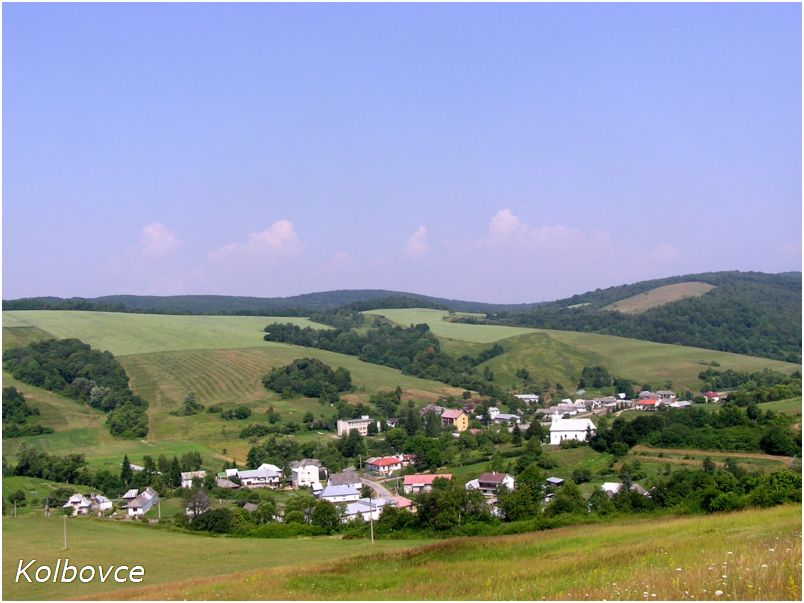

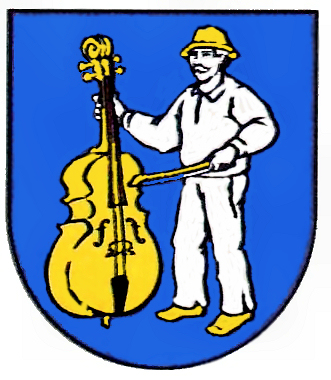
- Flag Coat of arms

- Location of Kolbovce in the Prešov Region Location of Kolbovce in Slovakia
- Coordinates: 49.17°N 21.72°E
- Country: Slovakia
- Region: Prešov Region
- District: Stropkov District
- First mentioned: 1408

Area
  - Total: 9.43 km^{2} (3.64 sq mi)
- Elevation: 211 m (692 ft)

Population (2025)
  - Total: 187
- Time zone: UTC+1 (CET)
  - Summer (DST): UTC+2 (CEST)
- Postal code: 903 1
- Area code: +421 57
- Vehicle registration plate (until 2022): SP
- Website: kolbovce.sk

Kolbovce (Rusyn: Колбівцї; Hungarian: Köves) is a village and municipality in Stropkov District in the Prešov Region of north-eastern Slovakia.

== History ==
In historical records the village was first mentioned in 1408.

== Geography ==
The municipality lies at an altitude of 211 metres (692 ft) and covers an area of 9.43 km^{2} (3.64 sq mi) (2025).

== Population ==
Population statistic (10 years)
Year	1995	2005	2015	2025
Count	144	179	195	187
Difference		+24.30%	+8.93%	−4.10%

Population statistic
Year	2024	2025
Count	185	187
Difference		+1.08%

It has a population of 187 people (31 December 2025).

=== Ethnicity ===
Census 2021 (1+ %)
Ethnicity	Number	Fraction
Slovak	101	57.06%
Romani	76	42.93%
Rusyn	63	35.59%
Not found out	5	2.82%
Russian	2	1.12%
Total	177	

In year 2021 was 177 people by ethnicity 101 as Slovak, 76 as Romani, 63 as Rusyn, 5 as Not found out, 2 as Russian and 1 as Ukrainian.

Note on population: The difference values of population numbers in the table "Population statistic" and in the sections "Ethnicity" & "Religion" is caused by the use of various statistical methods.

=== Religion ===
Census 2021 (1+ %)
Religion	Number	Fraction
Greek Catholic Church	143	80.79%
Eastern Orthodox Church	18	10.17%
Roman Catholic Church	7	3.95%
None	4	2.26%
Not found out	3	1.69%
Total	177	

In year 2021 was 177 people by religion 143 from Greek Catholic Church, 18 from Eastern Orthodox Church, 7 from Roman Catholic Church, 4 from None, 3 from Not found out, 1 from Calvinist Church and 1 from Evangelical Church.
