= Soľník =

- Municipality
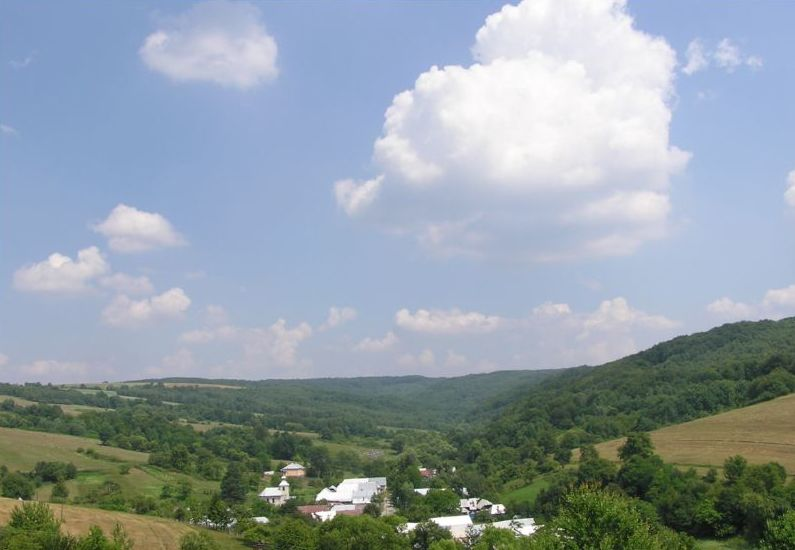

- Flag

- Location of Soľník in the Prešov Region Location of Soľník in Slovakia
- Coordinates: 49.22°N 21.74°E
- Country: Slovakia
- Region: Prešov Region
- District: Stropkov District
- First mentioned: 1454

Area
  - Total: 4.40 km^{2} (1.70 sq mi)
- Elevation: 288 m (945 ft)

Population (2025)
  - Total: 32
- Time zone: UTC+1 (CET)
  - Summer (DST): UTC+2 (CEST)
- Postal code: 903 1
- Area code: +421 54
- Vehicle registration plate (until 2022): SP

Soľník (Hungarian: Szálnok) is a village and municipality in Stropkov District in the Prešov Region of north-eastern Slovakia.

== History ==
In historical records the village was first mentioned in 1454.

== Geography ==
The municipality lies at an altitude of 288 metres (945 ft) and covers an area of 4.40 km^{2} (1.70 sq mi) (2025).

== Population ==
Population statistic (10 years)
Year	1995	2005	2015	2025
Count	69	42	35	32
Difference		−39.13%	−16.66%	−8.57%

Population statistic
Year	2024	2025
Count	33	32
Difference		−3.03%

It has a population of 32 people (31 December 2025).

=== Ethnicity ===
Census 2021 (1+ %)
Ethnicity	Number	Fraction
Slovak	35	100%
Rusyn	15	42.85%
Total	35	

In year 2021 was 35 people by ethnicity 35 as Slovak and 15 as Rusyn.

Note on population: The difference values of population numbers in the table "Population statistic" and in the sections "Ethnicity" & "Religion" is caused by the use of various statistical methods.

=== Religion ===
Census 2021 (1+ %)
Religion	Number	Fraction
Greek Catholic Church	23	65.71%
Eastern Orthodox Church	7	20%
Roman Catholic Church	4	11.43%
None	1	2.86%
Total	35	

In year 2021 was 35 people by religion 23 from Greek Catholic Church, 7 from Eastern Orthodox Church, 4 from Roman Catholic Church and 1 from None.
