= Makovce =

- Municipality
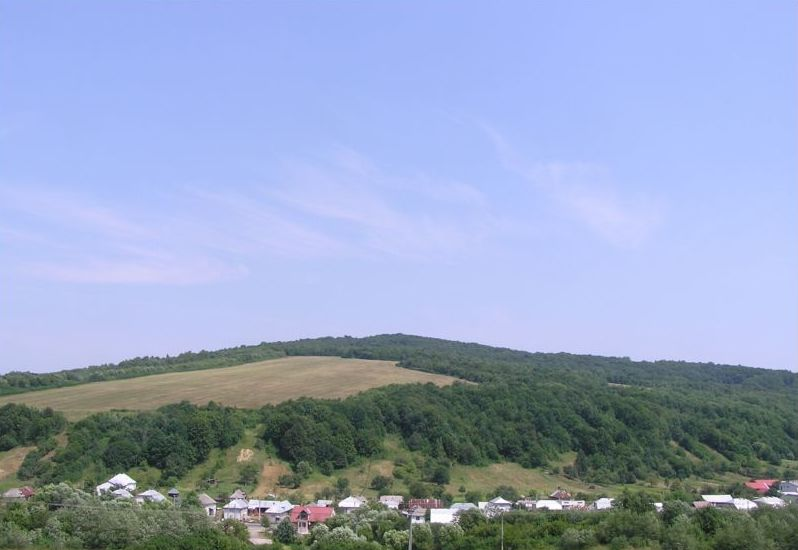

- Flag

- Location of Makovce in the Prešov Region Location of Makovce in Slovakia
- Coordinates: 49.27°N 21.75°E
- Country: Slovakia
- Region: Prešov Region
- District: Stropkov District
- First mentioned: 1408

Area
  - Total: 4.56 km^{2} (1.76 sq mi)
- Elevation: 255 m (837 ft)

Population (2025)
  - Total: 142
- Time zone: UTC+1 (CET)
  - Summer (DST): UTC+2 (CEST)
- Postal code: 902 3
- Area code: +421 54
- Vehicle registration plate (until 2022): SP
- Website: www.makovce.sk

Makovce (Hungarian: Mákos; Rusyn: Маківцї) is a village and municipality in Stropkov District in the Prešov Region of north-eastern Slovakia.

== History ==
In historical records the village was first mentioned in 1408.

== Geography ==
The municipality lies at an altitude of 255 metres (837 ft) and covers an area of 4.56 km^{2} (1.76 sq mi) (2025).

== Population ==
Population statistic (10 years)
Year	1995	2005	2015	2025
Count	181	186	157	142
Difference		+2.76%	−15.59%	−9.55%

Population statistic
Year	2024	2025
Count	146	142
Difference		−2.73%

It has a population of 142 people (31 December 2025).

=== Ethnicity ===
Census 2021 (1+ %)
Ethnicity	Number	Fraction
Slovak	118	81.94%
Rusyn	58	40.27%
Ukrainian	5	3.47%
Not found out	3	2.08%
Total	144	

In year 2021 was 144 people by ethnicity 118 as Slovak, 58 as Rusyn, 5 as Ukrainian, 3 as Not found out and 1 as Czech.

Note on population: The difference values of population numbers in the table "Population statistic" and in the sections "Ethnicity" & "Religion" is caused by the use of various statistical methods.

=== Religion ===
Census 2021 (1+ %)
Religion	Number	Fraction
Greek Catholic Church	119	82.64%
Eastern Orthodox Church	12	8.33%
Roman Catholic Church	6	4.17%
None	4	2.78%
Not found out	3	2.08%
Total	144	

In year 2021 was 144 people by religion 119 from Greek Catholic Church, 12 from Eastern Orthodox Church, 6 from Roman Catholic Church, 4 from None and 3 from Not found out.
