= Bystrá, Stropkov District =

Bystrá
- Municipality
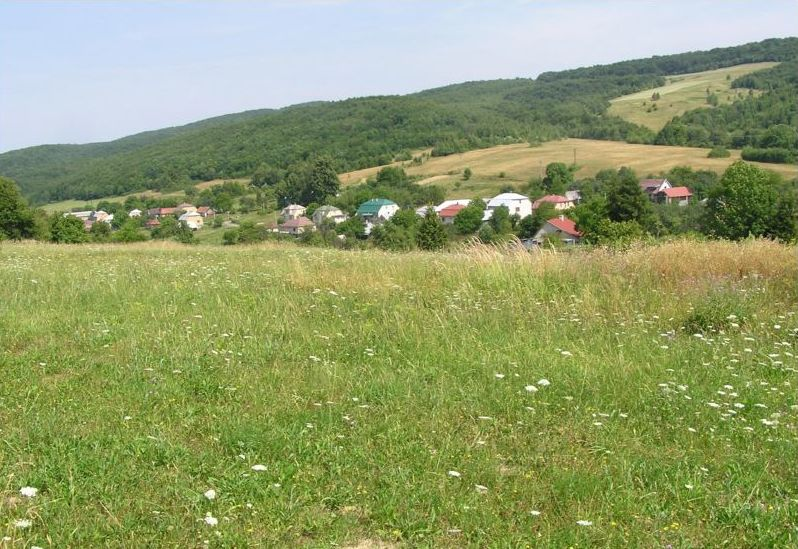

- Flag

- Location of Bystrá in the Prešov Region Location of Bystrá in Slovakia
- Coordinates: 49.24°N 21.82°E
- Country: Slovakia
- Region: Prešov Region
- District: Stropkov District
- First mentioned: 1405

Area
  - Total: 3.01 km^{2} (1.16 sq mi)
- Elevation: 379 m (1,243 ft)

Population (2025)
  - Total: 15
- Time zone: UTC+1 (CET)
  - Summer (DST): UTC+2 (CEST)
- Postal code: 902 3
- Area code: +421 54
- Vehicle registration plate (until 2022): SP

Bystrá (Rusyn: Быстра; Hungarian: Hegyesbisztra) is a village and municipality in Stropkov District in the Prešov Region of north-eastern Slovakia.

== Background ==
In historical records the village was first mentioned in 1405. The municipality lies at an altitude of 400 metres and covers an area of 3.012 km².

== Population ==
Population statistic (10 years)
Year	1995	2005	2015	2025
Count	45	30	29	15
Difference		−33.33%	−3.33%	−48.27%

Population statistic
Year	2024	2025
Count	16	15
Difference		−6.25%

It has a population of 15 people (31 December 2025).

=== Ethnicity ===
Census 2021 (1+ %)
Ethnicity	Number	Fraction
Slovak	18	85.71%
Rusyn	13	61.9%
Total	21	

In year 2021 was 21 people by ethnicity 18 as Slovak and 13 as Rusyn.

Note on population: The difference values of population numbers in the table "Population statistic" and in the sections "Ethnicity" & "Religion" is caused by the use of various statistical methods.

=== Religion ===
Census 2021 (1+ %)
Religion	Number	Fraction
Greek Catholic Church	19	90.48%
Roman Catholic Church	1	4.76%
Evangelical Church	1	4.76%
Total	21	

In year 2021 was 21 people by religion 19 from Greek Catholic Church, 1 from Roman Catholic Church and 1 from Evangelical Church.

According to the 2001 Census, the village has a population of about 33 people. 52.6% were Slovak and 47.4% Rusyn. 92.1% were Greek Catholic, 5.3% Orthodox and 2.6% Roman Catholic.

== Genealogical resources ==
The records for genealogical research are available at the state archive "Statny Archiv in Presov, Slovakia"

- Greek Catholic church records (births/marriages/deaths): 1885-1952 (parish B)

== See also ==
- List of municipalities and towns in Slovakia
