= Krišlovce =

- Municipality
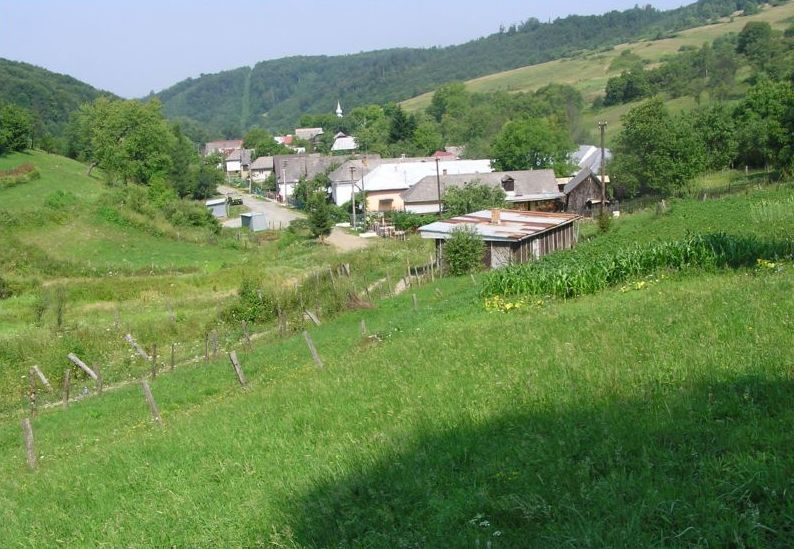

- Flag

- Location of Krišlovce in the Prešov Region Location of Krišlovce in Slovakia
- Coordinates: 49.13°N 21.73°E
- Country: Slovakia
- Region: Prešov Region
- District: Stropkov District
- First mentioned: 1567

Area
  - Total: 4.37 km^{2} (1.69 sq mi)
- Elevation: 275 m (902 ft)

Population (2025)
  - Total: 27
- Time zone: UTC+1 (CET)
  - Summer (DST): UTC+2 (CEST)
- Postal code: 903 1
- Area code: +421 54
- Vehicle registration plate (until 2022): SP

Krišlovce (Hungarian: Kisvölgy; Rusyn: Кришлівцї) is a village and municipality in Stropkov District in the Prešov Region of north-eastern Slovakia.

== History ==
In historical records the village was first mentioned in 1567.

== Geography ==
The municipality lies at an altitude of 275 metres (902 ft) and covers an area of 4.37 km^{2} (1.69 sq mi) (2025).

== Population ==
Population statistic (10 years)
| Year | 1995 | 2005 | 2015 | 2025 |
|---|---|---|---|---|
| Count | 62 | 45 | 33 | 27 |
| Difference | | −27.41% | −26.66% | −18.18% |

Population statistic
| Year | 2024 | 2025 |
|---|---|---|
| Count | 27 | 27 |
| Difference | | +0% |

It has a population of 27 people (31 December 2025).

=== Ethnicity ===
Census 2021 (1+ %)
| Ethnicity | Number | Fraction |
|---|---|---|
| Slovak | 22 | 68.75% |
| Rusyn | 22 | 68.75% |
| Total | 32 | |

In year 2021 was 32 people by ethnicity 22 as Slovak and 22 as Rusyn.

Note on population: The difference values of population numbers in the table "Population statistic" and in the sections "Ethnicity" & "Religion" is caused by the use of various statistical methods.

=== Religion ===
Census 2021 (1+ %)
| Religion | Number | Fraction |
|---|---|---|
| Greek Catholic Church | 30 | 93.75% |
| Roman Catholic Church | 2 | 6.25% |
| Total | 32 | |

In year 2021 was 32 people by religion 30 from Greek Catholic Church and 2 from Roman Catholic Church.
