= Staškovce =

- Municipality
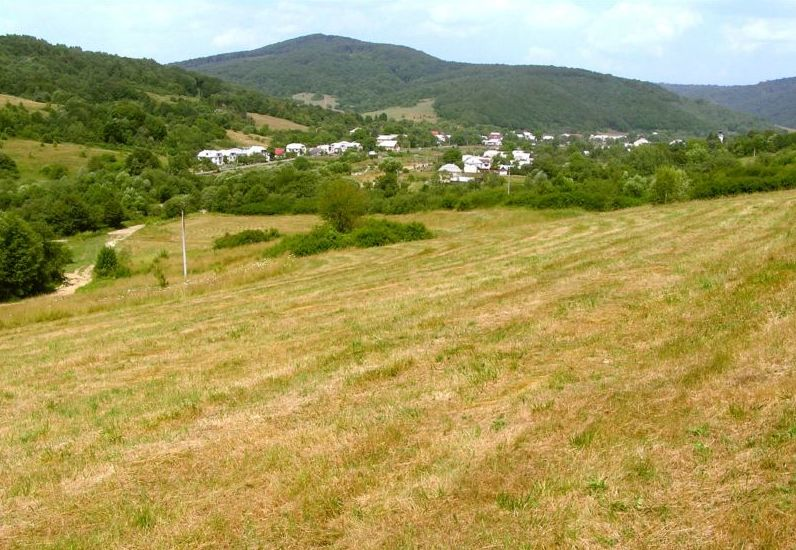

- Flag

- Location of Staškovce in the Prešov Region Location of Staškovce in Slovakia
- Coordinates: 49.28°N 21.75°E
- Country: Slovakia
- Region: Prešov Region
- District: Stropkov District
- First mentioned: 1408

Area
  - Total: 8.45 km^{2} (3.26 sq mi)
- Elevation: 271 m (889 ft)

Population (2025)
  - Total: 235
- Time zone: UTC+1 (CET)
  - Summer (DST): UTC+2 (CEST)
- Postal code: 902 3
- Area code: +421 54
- Vehicle registration plate (until 2022): SP
- Website: www.staskovce.sk

Staškovce (Hungarian: Sztaskóc) is a village and municipality in Stropkov District in the Prešov Region of north-eastern Slovakia.

== History ==
In historical records the village was first mentioned in 1414.

== Geography ==
The municipality lies at an altitude of 271 metres (889 ft) and covers an area of 8.45 km^{2} (3.26 sq mi) (2025).

== Population ==
Population statistic (10 years)
Year	1995	2005	2015	2025
Count	273	270	248	235
Difference		−1.09%	−8.14%	−5.24%

Population statistic
Year	2024	2025
Count	236	235
Difference		−0.42%

It has a population of 235 people (31 December 2025).

=== Ethnicity ===
Census 2021 (1+ %)
Ethnicity	Number	Fraction
Slovak	195	77.68%
Rusyn	107	42.62%
Not found out	14	5.57%
Total	251	

In year 2021 was 251 people by ethnicity 195 as Slovak, 107 as Rusyn, 14 as Not found out, 2 as Ukrainian, 1 as Czech, 1 as Romani, 1 as Russian and 1 as Hungarian.

Note on population: The difference values of population numbers in the table "Population statistic" and in the sections "Ethnicity" & "Religion" is caused by the use of various statistical methods.

=== Religion ===
Census 2021 (1+ %)
Religion	Number	Fraction
Greek Catholic Church	196	78.09%
Roman Catholic Church	25	9.96%
Not found out	12	4.78%
Eastern Orthodox Church	10	3.98%
None	7	2.79%
Total	251	

In year 2021 was 251 people by religion 196 from Greek Catholic Church, 25 from Roman Catholic Church, 12 from Not found out, 10 from Eastern Orthodox Church, 7 from None and 1 from Evangelical Church.
