= Varechovce =

- Municipality
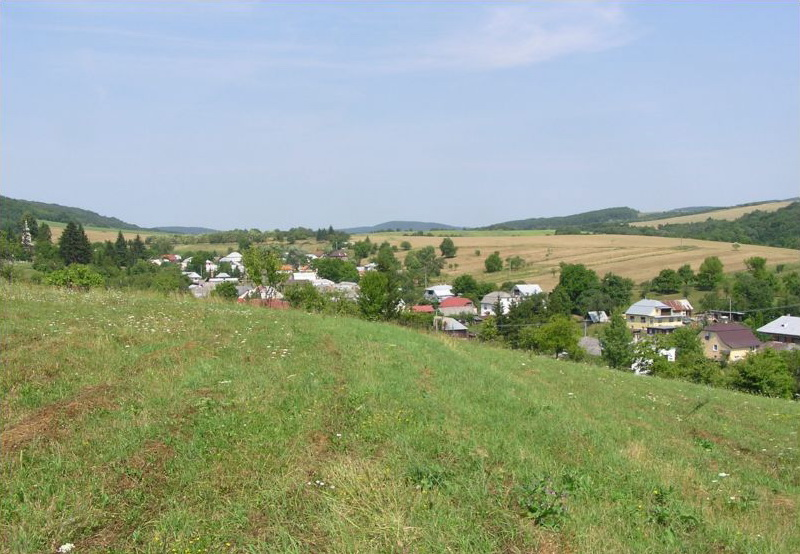

- Flag

- Location of Varechovce in the Prešov Region Location of Varechovce in Slovakia
- Coordinates: 49.23°N 21.80°E
- Country: Slovakia
- Region: Prešov Region
- District: Stropkov District
- First mentioned: 1430

Area
  - Total: 10.58 km^{2} (4.08 sq mi)
- Elevation: 318 m (1,043 ft)

Population (2025)
  - Total: 132
- Time zone: UTC+1 (CET)
  - Summer (DST): UTC+2 (CEST)
- Postal code: 902 3
- Area code: +421 54
- Vehicle registration plate (until 2022): SP
- Website: varechovce.sk

Varechovce (Hungarian: Variháza) is a village and municipality in Stropkov District in the Prešov Region of north-eastern Slovakia.

== History ==
In historical records the village was first mentioned in 1430.

== Geography ==
The municipality lies at an altitude of 318 metres (1,043 ft) and covers an area of 10.58 km^{2} (4.08 sq mi) (2025).

== Population ==
Population statistic (10 years)
Year	1995	2005	2015	2025
Count	180	157	158	132
Difference		−12.77%	+0.63%	−16.45%

Population statistic
Year	2024	2025
Count	135	132
Difference		−2.22%

It has a population of 132 people (31 December 2025).

=== Ethnicity ===
Census 2021 (1+ %)
Ethnicity	Number	Fraction
Slovak	111	80.43%
Rusyn	59	42.75%
Ukrainian	6	4.34%
Not found out	4	2.89%
Czech	2	1.44%
Total	138	

In year 2021 was 138 people by ethnicity 111 as Slovak, 59 as Rusyn, 6 as Ukrainian, 4 as Not found out, 2 as Czech, 1 as Russian and 1 as Polish.

Note on population: The difference values of population numbers in the table "Population statistic" and in the sections "Ethnicity" & "Religion" is caused by the use of various statistical methods.

=== Religion ===
Census 2021 (1+ %)
Religion	Number	Fraction
Greek Catholic Church	102	73.91%
Roman Catholic Church	18	13.04%
None	9	6.52%
Eastern Orthodox Church	4	2.9%
Not found out	3	2.17%
Ad hoc movements	2	1.45%
Total	138	

In year 2021 was 138 people by religion 102 from Greek Catholic Church, 18 from Roman Catholic Church, 9 from None, 4 from Eastern Orthodox Church, 3 from Not found out and 2 from Ad hoc movements.
