= Vyšná Olšava =

- Municipality
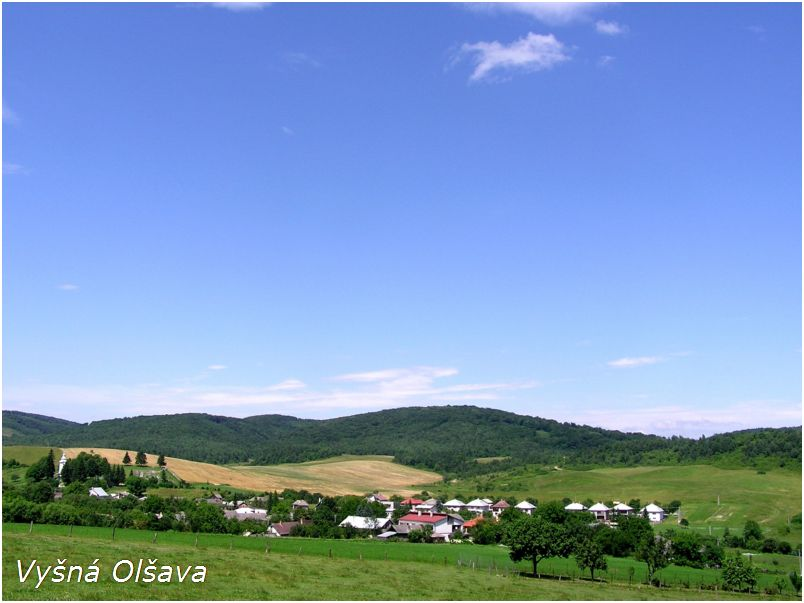

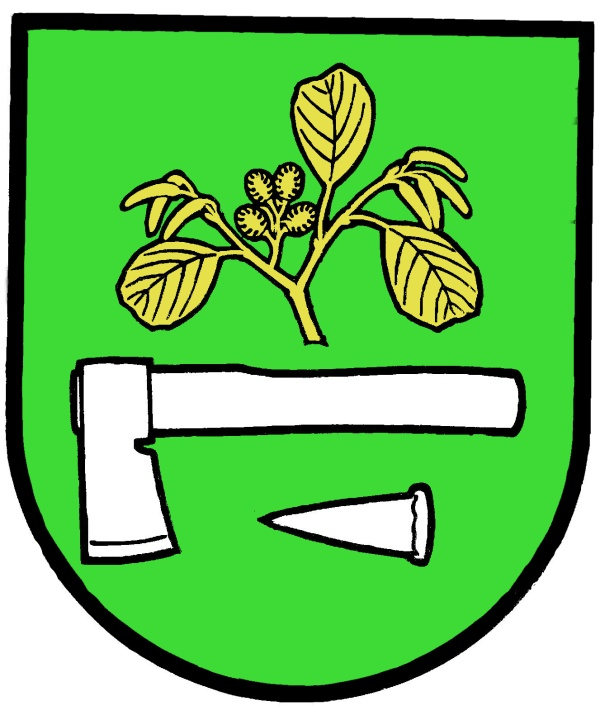
- Flag Coat of arms

- Location of Vyšná Olšava in the Prešov Region Location of Vyšná Olšava in Slovakia
- Coordinates: 49.17°N 21.60°E
- Country: Slovakia
- Region: Prešov Region
- District: Stropkov District
- First mentioned: 1382

Area
  - Total: 13.77 km^{2} (5.32 sq mi)
- Elevation: 204 m (669 ft)

Population (2025)
  - Total: 622
- Time zone: UTC+1 (CET)
  - Summer (DST): UTC+2 (CEST)
- Postal code: 903 2
- Area code: +421 54
- Vehicle registration plate (until 2022): SP
- Website: vysnaolsava.sk

Vyšná Olšava (Hungarian: Felsőolsva) is a village and municipality in Stropkov District in the Prešov Region of north-eastern Slovakia.

== History ==
In historical records the village was first mentioned in 1382.

== Geography ==
The municipality lies at an altitude of 204 metres (669 ft) and covers an area of 13.77 km^{2} (5.32 sq mi) (2025).

== Population ==
Population statistic (10 years)
Year	1995	2005	2015	2025
Count	516	611	645	622
Difference		+18.41%	+5.56%	−3.56%

Population statistic
Year	2024	2025
Count	623	622
Difference		−0.16%

It has a population of 622 people (31 December 2025).

=== Ethnicity ===
Census 2021 (1+ %)
Ethnicity	Number	Fraction
Slovak	583	90.95%
Rusyn	77	12.01%
Not found out	46	7.17%
Romani	15	2.34%
Total	641	

In year 2021 was 641 people by ethnicity 583 as Slovak, 77 as Rusyn, 46 as Not found out, 15 as Romani, 2 as Czech and 1 as Romanian.

Note on population: The difference values of population numbers in the table "Population statistic" and in the sections "Ethnicity" & "Religion" is caused by the use of various statistical methods.

=== Religion ===
Census 2021 (1+ %)
Religion	Number	Fraction
Greek Catholic Church	509	79.41%
Roman Catholic Church	50	7.8%
Not found out	44	6.86%
Eastern Orthodox Church	20	3.12%
None	12	1.87%
Total	641	

In year 2021 was 641 people by religion 509 from Greek Catholic Church, 50 from Roman Catholic Church, 44 from Not found out, 20 from Eastern Orthodox Church, 12 from None, 4 from Calvinist Church and 2 from Evangelical Church.
