= Chotča =

- Municipality
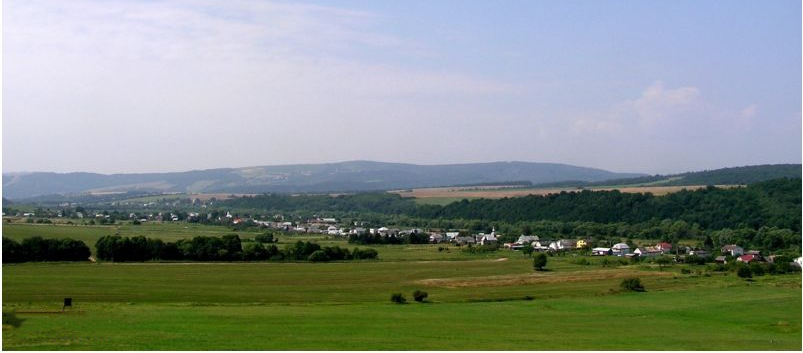

- Flag

- Location of Chotča in the Prešov Region Location of Chotča in Slovakia
- Coordinates: 49.25°N 21.78°E
- Country: Slovakia
- Region: Prešov Region
- District: Stropkov District
- First mentioned: 1408

Area
  - Total: 10.58 km^{2} (4.08 sq mi)
- Elevation: 217 m (712 ft)

Population (2025)
  - Total: 646
- Time zone: UTC+1 (CET)
  - Summer (DST): UTC+2 (CEST)
- Postal code: 902 1
- Area code: +421 54
- Vehicle registration plate (until 2022): SP
- Website: www.chotca.sk

Chotča (Hungarian: Hocsa) is a village and municipality in Stropkov District in the Prešov Region of north-eastern Slovakia.

== History ==
In historical records the village was first mentioned in 1408.

== Geography ==
The municipality lies at an altitude of 217 metres (712 ft) and covers an area of 10.58 km^{2} (4.08 sq mi) (2025).

== Population ==
Population statistic (10 years)
Year	1995	2005	2015	2025
Count	534	567	608	646
Difference		+6.17%	+7.23%	+6.25%

Population statistic
Year	2024	2025
Count	652	646
Difference		−0.92%

It has a population of 646 people (31 December 2025).

=== Ethnicity ===
Census 2021 (1+ %)
Ethnicity	Number	Fraction
Slovak	595	94.59%
Rusyn	104	16.53%
Not found out	16	2.54%
Total	629	

In year 2021 was 629 people by ethnicity 595 as Slovak, 104 as Rusyn, 16 as Not found out, 5 as Czech, 5 as Ukrainian and 1 as Hungarian.

Note on population: The difference values of population numbers in the table "Population statistic" and in the sections "Ethnicity" & "Religion" is caused by the use of various statistical methods.

=== Religion ===
Census 2021 (1+ %)
Religion	Number	Fraction
Roman Catholic Church	304	48.33%
Greek Catholic Church	268	42.61%
Eastern Orthodox Church	24	3.82%
None	18	2.86%
Not found out	11	1.75%
Total	629	

In year 2021 was 629 people by religion 304 from Roman Catholic Church, 268 from Greek Catholic Church, 24 from Eastern Orthodox Church, 18 from None, 11 from Not found out, 3 from Jehovah's Witnesses and 1 from Ad hoc movements.
