= Malá Poľana =

- Municipality
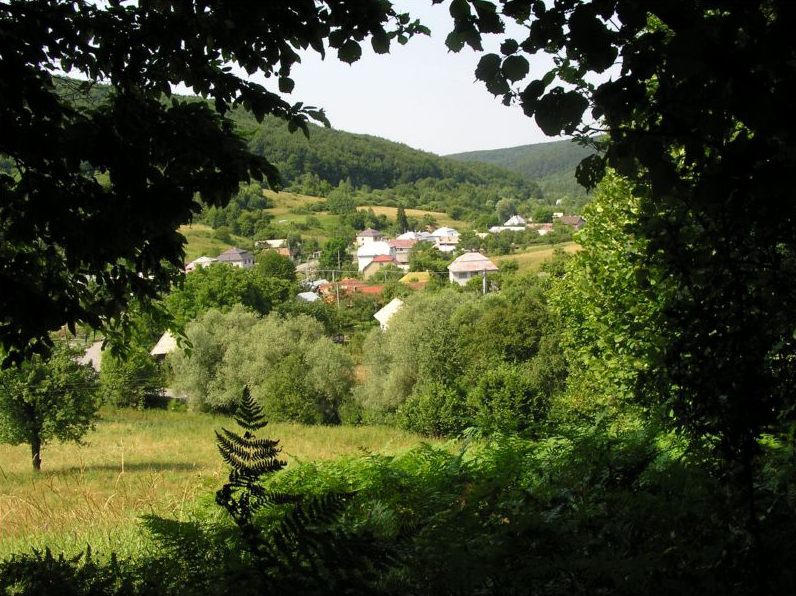

- Flag

- Location of Malá Poľana in the Prešov Region Location of Malá Poľana in Slovakia
- Coordinates: 49.28°N 21.82°E
- Country: Slovakia
- Region: Prešov Region
- District: Stropkov District
- First mentioned: 1567

Area
  - Total: 10.94 km^{2} (4.22 sq mi)
- Elevation: 327 m (1,073 ft)

Population (2025)
  - Total: 96
- Time zone: UTC+1 (CET)
  - Summer (DST): UTC+2 (CEST)
- Postal code: 902 4
- Area code: +421 54
- Vehicle registration plate (until 2022): SP

Malá Poľana (Rusyn: Мала Поляна; Hungarian: Kispolány) is a village and municipality in Stropkov District in the Prešov Region of north-eastern Slovakia.

== History ==
In historical records the village was first mentioned in 1567.

== Geography ==
The municipality lies at an altitude of 327 metres (1,073 ft) and covers an area of 10.94 km^{2} (4.22 sq mi) (2025).

== Population ==
Population statistic (10 years)
Year	1995	2005	2015	2025
Count	132	113	110	96
Difference		−14.39%	−2.65%	−12.72%

Population statistic
Year	2024	2025
Count	98	96
Difference		−2.04%

It has a population of 96 people (31 December 2025).

=== Ethnicity ===
Census 2021 (1+ %)
Ethnicity	Number	Fraction
Rusyn	77	66.95%
Slovak	70	60.86%
Other	4	3.47%
Romani	2	1.73%
Not found out	2	1.73%
Total	115	

In year 2021 was 115 people by ethnicity 77 as Rusyn, 70 as Slovak, 4 as Other, 2 as Romani, 2 as Not found out and 1 as Ukrainian.

Note on population: The difference values of population numbers in the table "Population statistic" and in the sections "Ethnicity" & "Religion" is caused by the use of various statistical methods.

=== Religion ===
Census 2021 (1+ %)
Religion	Number	Fraction
Greek Catholic Church	75	65.22%
Eastern Orthodox Church	23	20%
Roman Catholic Church	9	7.83%
None	4	3.48%
Buddhism	3	2.61%
Total	115	

In year 2021 was 115 people by religion 75 from Greek Catholic Church, 23 from Eastern Orthodox Church, 9 from Roman Catholic Church, 4 from None, 3 from Buddhism and 1 from Not found out.
