= Havaj =

- Municipality
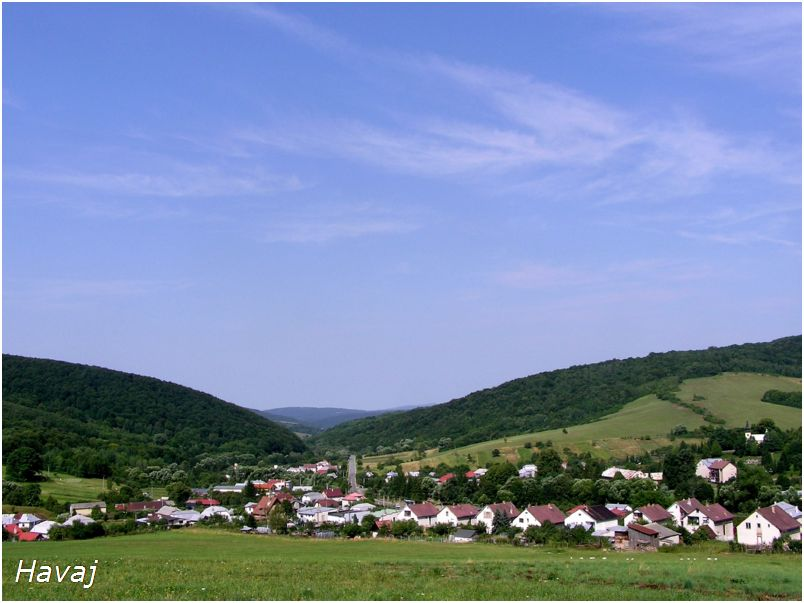

- Flag
- Motto(s): If your dreams don't scare you, they aren't big enough
- Location of Havaj in the Prešov Region Location of Havaj in Slovakia
- Coordinates: 49.25°N 21.78°E
- Country: Slovakia
- Region: Prešov Region
- District: Stropkov District
- First mentioned: 1403

Area
  - Total: 14.25 km^{2} (5.50 sq mi)
- Elevation: 274 m (899 ft)

Population (2025)
  - Total: 387
- Time zone: UTC+1 (CET)
  - Summer (DST): UTC+2 (CEST)
- Postal code: 902 3
- Area code: +421 54
- Vehicle registration plate (until 2022): SP
- Website: www.obechavaj.sk

Havaj (Rusyn: Гавай) is a village and municipality in Stropkov District in the Prešov Region of north-eastern Slovakia.

== History ==
In historical records, the village was first mentioned in 1403.

== Geography ==
The municipality lies at an altitude of 274 metres (899 ft) and covers an area of 14.25 km^{2} (5.50 sq mi) (2025).

== Population ==
Population statistic (10 years)
| Year | 1995 | 2005 | 2015 | 2025 |
|---|---|---|---|---|
| Count | 424 | 410 | 394 | 387 |
| Difference | | −3.30% | −3.90% | −1.77% |

Population statistic
| Year | 2024 | 2025 |
|---|---|---|
| Count | 393 | 387 |
| Difference | | −1.52% |

It has a population of 387 people (31 December 2025).

=== Ethnicity ===
Census 2021 (1+ %)
| Ethnicity | Number | Fraction |
|---|---|---|
| Slovak | 332 | 78.11% |
| Rusyn | 212 | 49.88% |
| Ukrainian | 8 | 1.88% |
| Total | 425 | |

In year 2021 was 425 people by ethnicity 332 as Slovak, 212 as Rusyn, 8 as Ukrainian, 4 as Czech, 3 as Romani, 3 as Not found out, 2 as Albanian, 1 as Russian and 1 as German.

Note on population: The difference values of population numbers in the table "Population statistic" and in the sections "Ethnicity" & "Religion" is caused by the use of various statistical methods.

=== Religion ===
Census 2021 (1+ %)
| Religion | Number | Fraction |
|---|---|---|
| Greek Catholic Church | 325 | 76.47% |
| Roman Catholic Church | 35 | 8.24% |
| None | 32 | 7.53% |
| Eastern Orthodox Church | 24 | 5.65% |
| Not found out | 5 | 1.18% |
| Total | 425 | |

In year 2021 was 425 people by religion 325 from Greek Catholic Church, 35 from Roman Catholic Church, 32 from None, 24 from Eastern Orthodox Church, 5 from Not found out, 2 from Islam, 1 from Old Catholic Church and 1 from Ad hoc movements.

== Trivia ==
Havaj is also the Slovak name of Hawaii.
