= Potôčky =

- Municipality
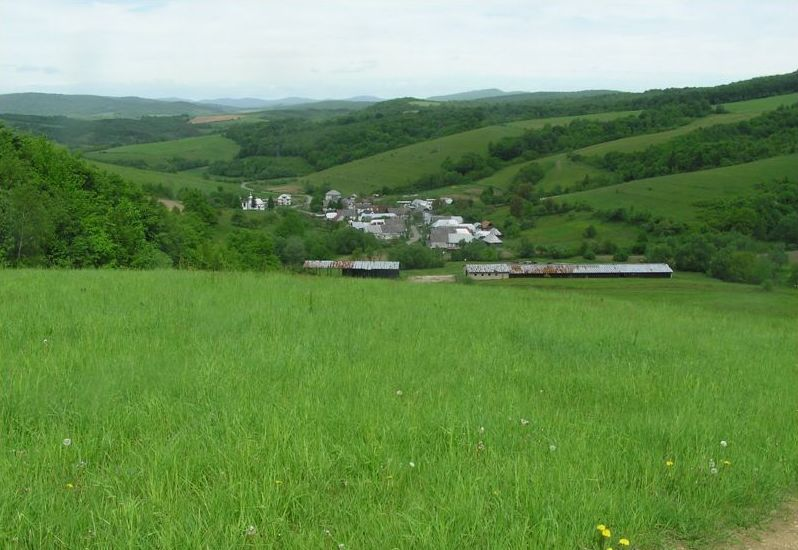

- Flag

- Location of Potôčky in the Prešov Region Location of Potôčky in Slovakia
- Coordinates: 49.21°N 21.72°E
- Country: Slovakia
- Region: Prešov Region
- District: Stropkov District
- First mentioned: 1567

Area
  - Total: 3.55 km^{2} (1.37 sq mi)
- Elevation: 254 m (833 ft)

Population (2025)
  - Total: 71
- Time zone: UTC+1 (CET)
  - Summer (DST): UTC+2 (CEST)
- Postal code: 910 1
- Area code: +421 54
- Vehicle registration plate (until 2022): SP

Potôčky (Rusyn: Потічкы; Hungarian: Érfalu) is a village and municipality in Stropkov District in the Prešov Region of north-eastern Slovakia.

== History ==
In historical records the village was first mentioned in 1567.

== Geography ==
The municipality lies at an altitude of 254 metres (833 ft) and covers an area of 3.55 km^{2} (1.37 sq mi) (2025).

== Population ==
Population statistic (10 years)
Year	1995	2005	2015	2025
Count	74	69	67	71
Difference		−6.75%	−2.89%	+5.97%

Population statistic
Year	2024	2025
Count	71	71
Difference		+0%

It has a population of 71 people (31 December 2025).

=== Ethnicity ===
Census 2021 (1+ %)
Ethnicity	Number	Fraction
Slovak	62	88.57%
Rusyn	37	52.85%
Total	70	

In year 2021 was 70 people by ethnicity 62 as Slovak and 37 as Rusyn.

Note on population: The difference values of population numbers in the table "Population statistic" and in the sections "Ethnicity" & "Religion" is caused by the use of various statistical methods.

=== Religion ===
Census 2021 (1+ %)
Religion	Number	Fraction
Greek Catholic Church	40	57.14%
Eastern Orthodox Church	22	31.43%
None	5	7.14%
Roman Catholic Church	3	4.29%
Total	70	

In year 2021 was 70 people by religion 40 from Greek Catholic Church, 22 from Eastern Orthodox Church, 5 from None and 3 from Roman Catholic Church.
