= Šandal =

- Municipality
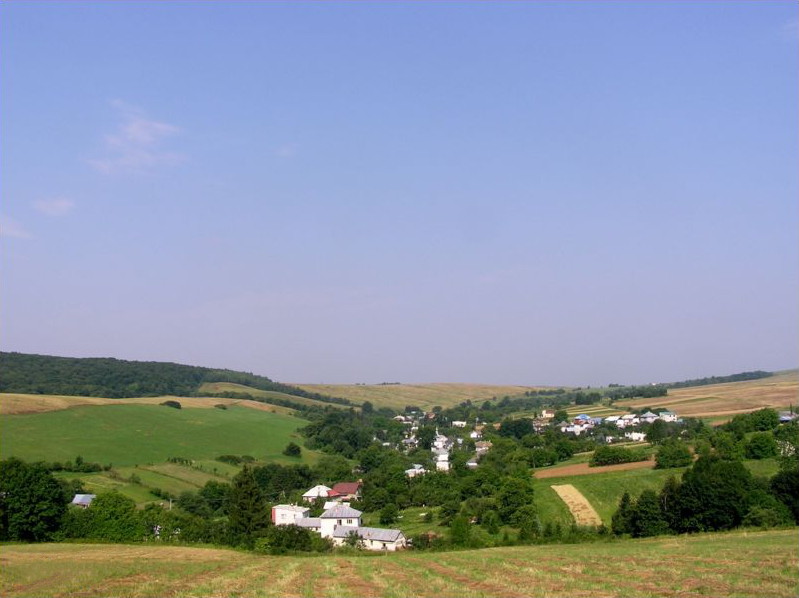

- Flag

- Location of Šandal in the Prešov Region Location of Šandal in Slovakia
- Coordinates: 49.18°N 21.62°E
- Country: Slovakia
- Region: Prešov Region
- District: Stropkov District
- First mentioned: 1427

Area
  - Total: 10.88 km^{2} (4.20 sq mi)
- Elevation: 252 m (827 ft)

Population (2025)
  - Total: 314
- Time zone: UTC+1 (CET)
  - Summer (DST): UTC+2 (CEST)
- Postal code: 910 1
- Area code: +421 54
- Vehicle registration plate (until 2022): SP
- Website: sandal.sk

Šandal (Hungarian: Sandal) is a village and municipality in Stropkov District in the Prešov Region of north-eastern Slovakia.

== History ==
In historical records the village was first mentioned in 1391.

== Geography ==
The municipality lies at an altitude of 252 metres (827 ft) and covers an area of 10.88 km^{2} (4.20 sq mi) (2025).

== Population ==
Population statistic (10 years)
| Year | 1995 | 2005 | 2015 | 2025 |
|---|---|---|---|---|
| Count | 310 | 305 | 311 | 314 |
| Difference | | −1.61% | +1.96% | +0.96% |

Population statistic
| Year | 2024 | 2025 |
|---|---|---|
| Count | 318 | 314 |
| Difference | | −1.25% |

It has a population of 314 people (31 December 2025).

=== Ethnicity ===
Census 2021 (1+ %)
| Ethnicity | Number | Fraction |
|---|---|---|
| Slovak | 302 | 97.41% |
| Rusyn | 20 | 6.45% |
| Total | 310 | |

In year 2021 was 310 people by ethnicity 302 as Slovak, 20 as Rusyn, 3 as Not found out, 2 as Polish and 1 as Czech.

Note on population: The difference values of population numbers in the table "Population statistic" and in the sections "Ethnicity" & "Religion" is caused by the use of various statistical methods.

=== Religion ===
Census 2021 (1+ %)
| Religion | Number | Fraction |
|---|---|---|
| Roman Catholic Church | 160 | 51.61% |
| Greek Catholic Church | 126 | 40.65% |
| None | 12 | 3.87% |
| Eastern Orthodox Church | 8 | 2.58% |
| Total | 310 | |

In year 2021 was 310 people by religion 160 from Roman Catholic Church, 126 from Greek Catholic Church, 12 from None, 8 from Eastern Orthodox Church, 1 from Not found out, 1 from Other, 1 from Evangelical Church and 1 from Apostolic Church.
