= Vislava =

- Municipality
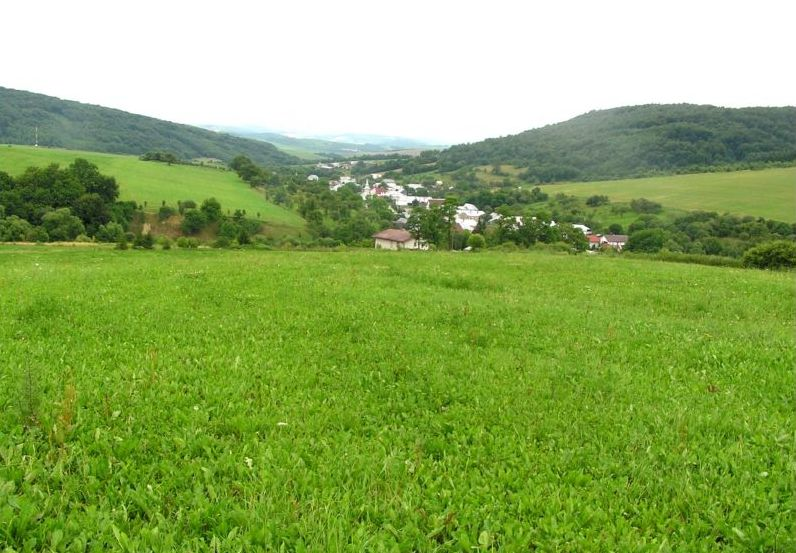

- Flag

- Location of Vislava in the Prešov Region Location of Vislava in Slovakia
- Coordinates: 49.28°N 21.67°E
- Country: Slovakia
- Region: Prešov Region
- District: Stropkov District
- First mentioned: 1353

Area
  - Total: 10.96 km^{2} (4.23 sq mi)
- Elevation: 260 m (850 ft)

Population (2025)
  - Total: 183
- Time zone: UTC+1 (CET)
  - Summer (DST): UTC+2 (CEST)
- Postal code: 902 1
- Area code: +421 54
- Vehicle registration plate (until 2022): SP
- Website: obecvislava.wordpress.com

Vislava (Hungarian: Kisvajszló; Rusyn: Віслава) is a village and municipality in Stropkov District in the Prešov Region of north-eastern Slovakia.

== History ==
In historical records the village was first mentioned in 1353.

== Geography ==
The municipality lies at an altitude of 260 metres (850 ft) and covers an area of 10.96 km^{2} (4.23 sq mi) (2025).

== Population ==
Population statistic (10 years)
Year	1995	2005	2015	2025
Count	242	228	199	183
Difference		−5.78%	−12.71%	−8.04%

Population statistic
Year	2024	2025
Count	187	183
Difference		−2.13%

It has a population of 183 people (31 December 2025).

=== Ethnicity ===
Census 2021 (1+ %)
Ethnicity	Number	Fraction
Slovak	188	93.53%
Rusyn	51	25.37%
Not found out	6	2.98%
Total	201	

In year 2021 was 201 people by ethnicity 188 as Slovak, 51 as Rusyn and 6 as Not found out.

Note on population: The difference values of population numbers in the table "Population statistic" and in the sections "Ethnicity" & "Religion" is caused by the use of various statistical methods.

=== Religion ===
Census 2021 (1+ %)
Religion	Number	Fraction
Greek Catholic Church	177	88.06%
Roman Catholic Church	13	6.47%
Not found out	6	2.99%
Eastern Orthodox Church	5	2.49%
Total	201	

In year 2021 was 201 people by religion 177 from Greek Catholic Church, 13 from Roman Catholic Church, 6 from Not found out and 5 from Eastern Orthodox Church.
