= Vladiča =

- Municipality
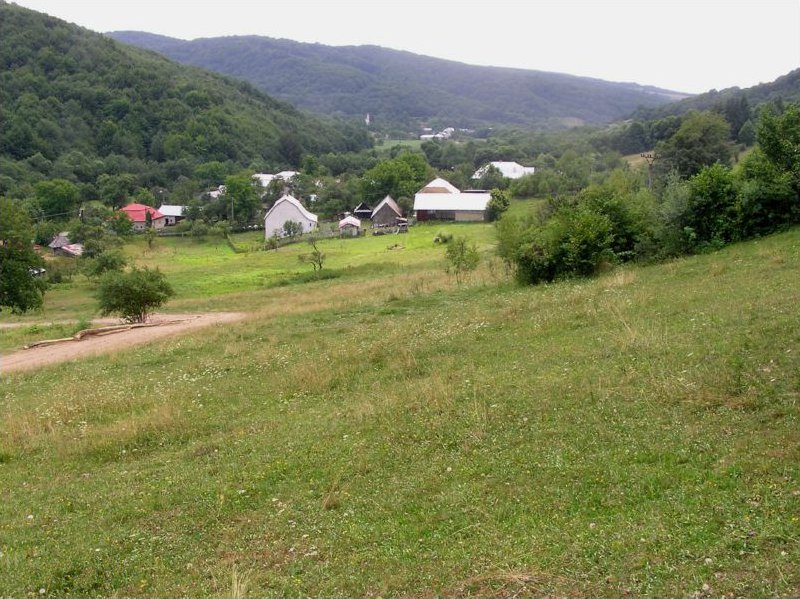

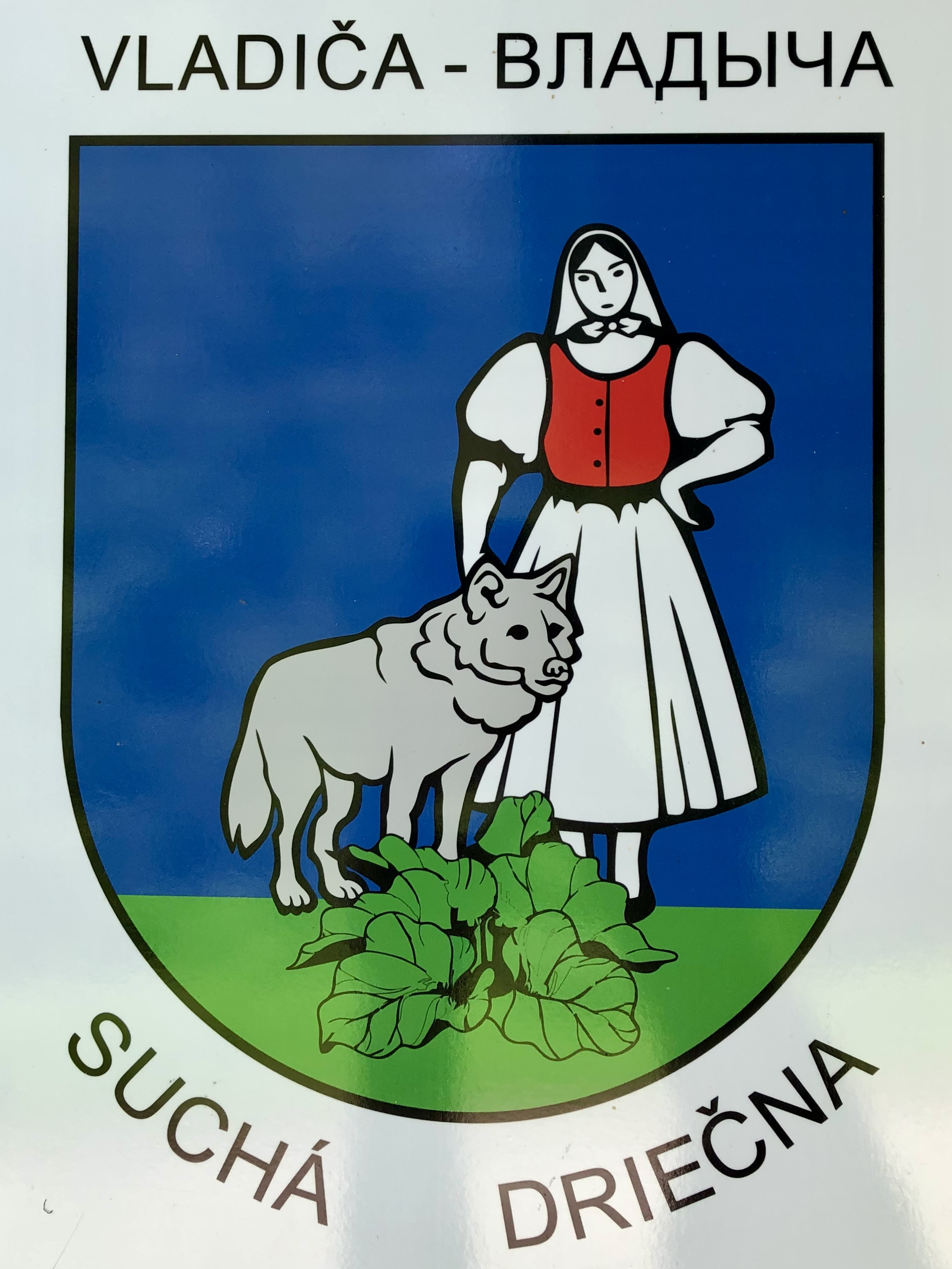
- Coat of arms

- Location of Vladiča in the Prešov Region Location of Vladiča in Slovakia
- Coordinates: 49.30°N 21.78°E
- Country: Slovakia
- Region: Prešov Region
- District: Stropkov District
- First mentioned: 1340

Area
  - Total: 26.98 km^{2} (10.42 sq mi)
- Elevation: 349 m (1,145 ft)

Population (2025)
  - Total: 63
- Time zone: UTC+1 (CET)
  - Summer (DST): UTC+2 (CEST)
- Postal code: 902 3
- Area code: +421 54
- Vehicle registration plate (until 2022): SP
- Website: vladica.estranky.sk

Vladiča (Hungarian: Ladács) is a village and municipality in Stropkov District in the 'Prešov Region of north-eastern Slovakia.

== History ==
In historical records the village was first mentioned in 1340.

== Geography ==
The municipality lies at an altitude of 349 metres (1,145 ft) and covers an area of 26.98 km^{2} (10.42 sq mi) (2025).

== Population ==
Population statistic (10 years)
Year	1995	2005	2015	2025
Count	107	68	59	63
Difference		−36.44%	−13.23%	+6.77%

Population statistic
Year	2024	2025
Count	59	63
Difference		+6.77%

It has a population of 63 people (31 December 2025).

=== Ethnicity ===
Census 2021 (1+ %)
Ethnicity	Number	Fraction
Slovak	52	80%
Rusyn	31	47.69%
Czech	7	10.76%
Ukrainian	1	1.53%
Canadian	1	1.53%
Total	65	

In year 2021 was 65 people by ethnicity 52 as Slovak, 31 as Rusyn, 7 as Czech, 1 as Ukrainian and 1 as Canadian.

Note on population: The difference values of population numbers in the table "Population statistic" and in the sections "Ethnicity" & "Religion" is caused by the use of various statistical methods.

=== Religion ===
Census 2021 (1+ %)
Religion	Number	Fraction
Greek Catholic Church	37	56.92%
Roman Catholic Church	14	21.54%
Eastern Orthodox Church	7	10.77%
None	5	7.69%
Ad hoc movements	2	3.08%
Total	65	

In year 2021 was 65 people by religion 37 from Greek Catholic Church, 14 from Roman Catholic Church, 7 from Eastern Orthodox Church, 5 from None and 2 from Ad hoc movements.
