= Nižná Olšava =

- Municipality
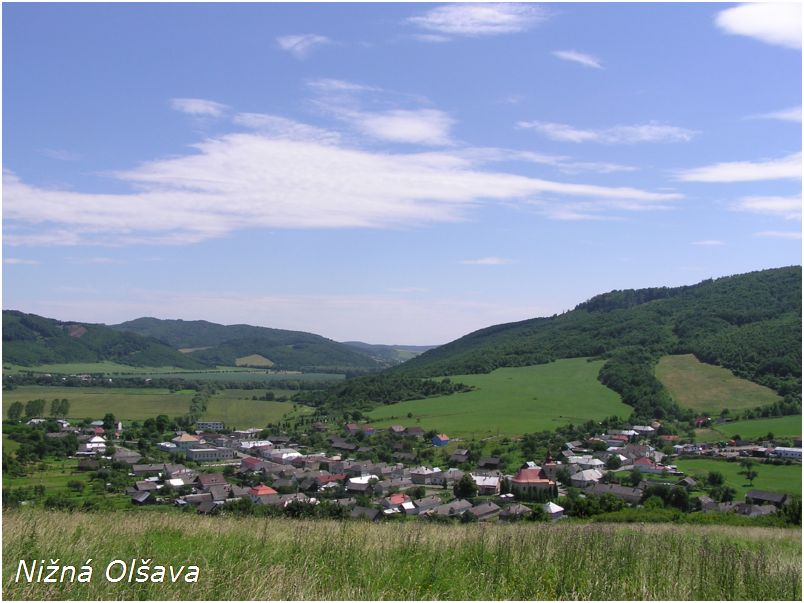

- Flag

- Location of Nižná Olšava in the Prešov Region Location of Nižná Olšava in Slovakia
- Coordinates: 49.15°N 21.63°E
- Country: Slovakia
- Region: Prešov Region
- District: Stropkov District
- First mentioned: 1390

Area
  - Total: 11.40 km^{2} (4.40 sq mi)
- Elevation: 175 m (574 ft)

Population (2025)
  - Total: 432
- Time zone: UTC+1 (CET)
  - Summer (DST): UTC+2 (CEST)
- Postal code: 903 2
- Area code: +421 54
- Vehicle registration plate (until 2022): SP
- Website: niznaolsava.sk

Nižná Olšava (Hungarian: Alsóolsva) is a village and municipality in Stropkov District in the Prešov Region of north-eastern Slovakia.

== History ==
In historical records the village was first mentioned in 1390.

== Geography ==
The municipality lies at an altitude of 175 metres (574 ft) and covers an area of 11.40 km^{2} (4.40 sq mi) (2025).

== Population ==
Population statistic (10 years)
Year	1995	2005	2015	2025
Count	381	391	426	432
Difference		+2.62%	+8.95%	+1.40%

Population statistic
Year	2024	2025
Count	431	432
Difference		+0.23%

It has a population of 432 people (31 December 2025).

=== Ethnicity ===
Census 2021 (1+ %)
Ethnicity	Number	Fraction
Slovak	408	96.45%
Romani	63	14.89%
Rusyn	20	4.72%
Not found out	8	1.89%
Total	423	

In year 2021 was 423 people by ethnicity 408 as Slovak, 63 as Romani, 20 as Rusyn, 8 as Not found out, 2 as Ukrainian, 1 as Czech and 1 as Other.

Note on population: The difference values of population numbers in the table "Population statistic" and in the sections "Ethnicity" & "Religion" is caused by the use of various statistical methods.

=== Religion ===
Census 2021 (1+ %)
Religion	Number	Fraction
Roman Catholic Church	248	58.63%
Greek Catholic Church	110	26%
Eastern Orthodox Church	43	10.17%
None	13	3.07%
Not found out	6	1.42%
Total	423	

In year 2021 was 423 people by religion 248 from Roman Catholic Church, 110 from Greek Catholic Church, 43 from Eastern Orthodox Church, 13 from None, 6 from Not found out, 1 from Christian Congregations in Slovakia, 1 from Other and 1 from Evangelical Church.
