= Bukovce =

- Municipality
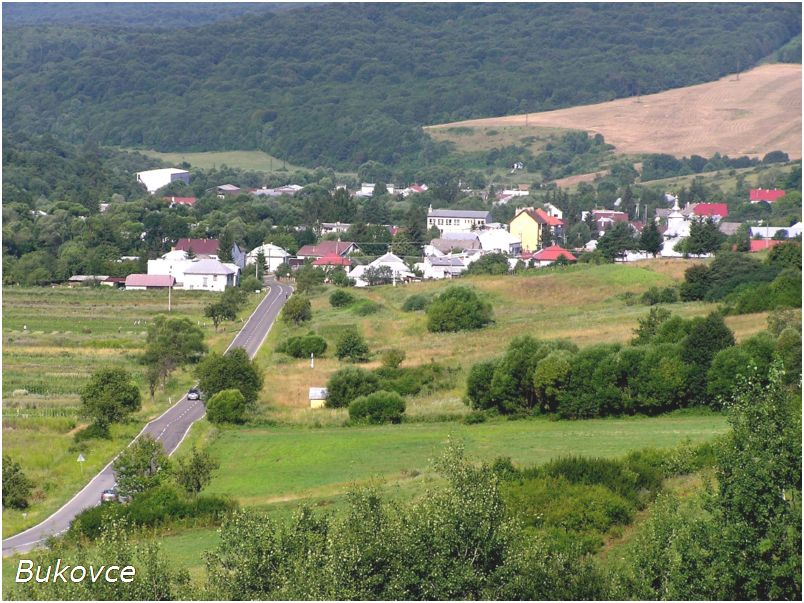

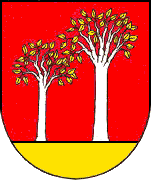
- Flag Coat of arms

- Location of Bukovce in the Prešov Region Location of Bukovce in Slovakia
- Coordinates: 49.27°N 21.71°E
- Country: Slovakia
- Region: Prešov Region
- District: Stropkov District
- First mentioned: 1379

Area
  - Total: 11.06 km^{2} (4.27 sq mi)
- Elevation: 235 m (771 ft)

Population (2025)
  - Total: 541
- Time zone: UTC+1 (CET)
  - Summer (DST): UTC+2 (CEST)
- Postal code: 902 2
- Area code: +421 54
- Vehicle registration plate (until 2022): SP
- Website: www.obecbukovce.sk

Bukovce (Rusyn: Буковець; Hungarian: Bukóc) is a village and municipality in Stropkov District in the Prešov Region of north-eastern Slovakia.

== History ==
In historical records the village was first mentioned in 1379.

== Geography ==
The municipality lies at an altitude of 235 metres (771 ft) and covers an area of 11.06 km^{2} (4.27 sq mi) (2025).

== Population ==
Population statistic (10 years)
| Year | 1995 | 2005 | 2015 | 2025 |
|---|---|---|---|---|
| Count | 494 | 572 | 534 | 541 |
| Difference | | +15.78% | −6.64% | +1.31% |

Population statistic
| Year | 2024 | 2025 |
|---|---|---|
| Count | 554 | 541 |
| Difference | | −2.34% |

It has a population of 541 people (31 December 2025).

=== Ethnicity ===
Census 2021 (1+ %)
| Ethnicity | Number | Fraction |
|---|---|---|
| Slovak | 467 | 89.46% |
| Rusyn | 176 | 33.71% |
| Romani | 34 | 6.51% |
| Not found out | 8 | 1.53% |
| Total | 522 | |

In year 2021 was 522 people by ethnicity 467 as Slovak, 176 as Rusyn, 34 as Romani, 8 as Not found out, 5 as Ukrainian, 2 as Romanian and 1 as Czech.

Note on population: The difference values of population numbers in the table "Population statistic" and in the sections "Ethnicity" & "Religion" is caused by the use of various statistical methods.

=== Religion ===
Census 2021 (1+ %)
| Religion | Number | Fraction |
|---|---|---|
| Greek Catholic Church | 436 | 83.52% |
| Roman Catholic Church | 38 | 7.28% |
| None | 18 | 3.45% |
| Eastern Orthodox Church | 16 | 3.07% |
| Total | 522 | |

In year 2021 was 522 people by religion 436 from Greek Catholic Church, 38 from Roman Catholic Church, 18 from None, 16 from Eastern Orthodox Church, 5 from Jehovah's Witnesses, 5 from Not found out, 3 from Evangelical Church and 1 from Other.

== Genealogical resources ==
The records for genealogical research are available at the state archive "Statny Archiv in Presov, Slovakia"

- Roman Catholic church records (births/marriages/deaths): 1700-1897 (parish B)
- Greek Catholic church records (births/marriages/deaths): 1851-1897 (parish A)

== See also ==
- List of municipalities and towns in Slovakia
