= Kožuchovce =

Village in Slovakia

- Municipality
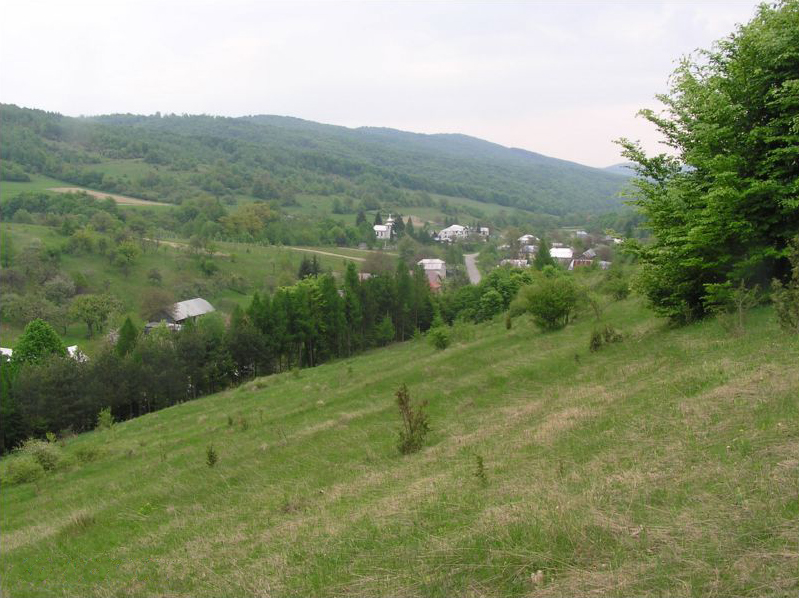

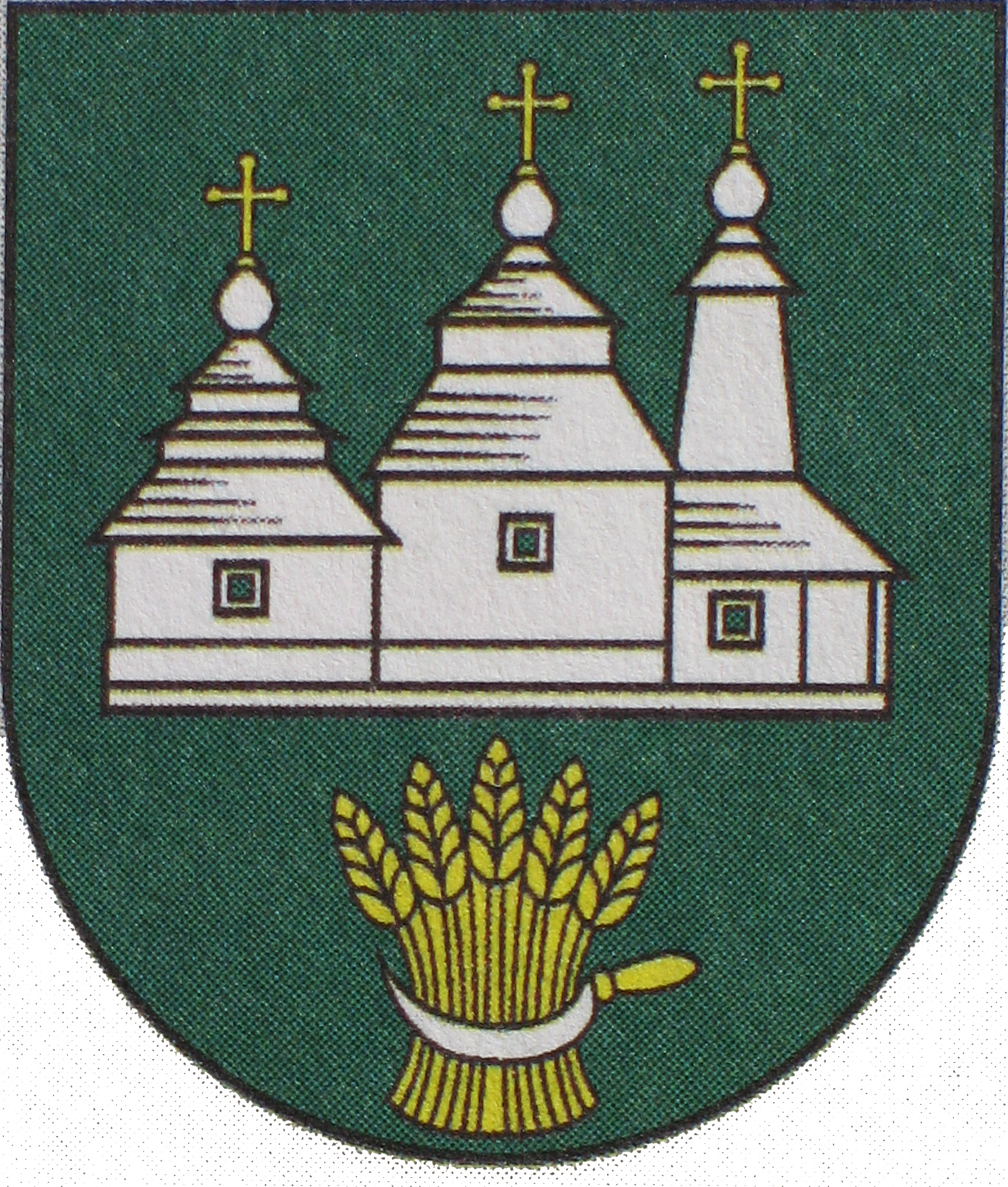
- Flag Coat of arms

- Location of Kožuchovce in the Prešov Region Location of Kožuchovce in Slovakia
- Coordinates: 49.32°N 21.70°E
- Country: Slovakia
- Region: Prešov Region
- District: Stropkov District
- First mentioned: 1618

Area
  - Total: 6.14 km^{2} (2.37 sq mi)
- Elevation: 340 m (1,120 ft)

Population (2025)
  - Total: 45
- Time zone: UTC+1 (CET)
  - Summer (DST): UTC+2 (CEST)
- Postal code: 902 2
- Area code: +421 54
- Vehicle registration plate (until 2022): SP

Kožuchovce (Rusyn: Кожухівцї; Hungarian: Körmös) is a village and municipality in Stropkov District in the Prešov Region of north-eastern Slovakia.

== History ==
In historical records the village was first mentioned in 1618.

== Geography ==
The municipality lies at an altitude of 340 metres (1,120 ft) and covers an area of 6.14 km^{2} (2.37 sq mi) (2025).

== Population ==
Population statistic (10 years)
Year	1995	2005	2015	2025
Count	73	72	64	45
Difference		−1.36%	−11.11%	−29.68%

Population statistic
Year	2024	2025
Count	46	45
Difference		−2.17%

It has a population of 45 people (31 December 2025).

=== Ethnicity ===
Census 2021 (1+ %)
Ethnicity	Number	Fraction
Slovak	42	87.5%
Rusyn	21	43.75%
Hungarian	1	2.08%
Total	48	

In year 2021 was 48 people by ethnicity 42 as Slovak, 21 as Rusyn and 1 as Hungarian.

Note on population: The difference values of population numbers in the table "Population statistic" and in the sections "Ethnicity" & "Religion" is caused by the use of various statistical methods.

=== Religion ===
Census 2021 (1+ %)
Religion	Number	Fraction
Greek Catholic Church	45	93.75%
Roman Catholic Church	1	2.08%
Eastern Orthodox Church	1	2.08%
Apostolic Church	1	2.08%
Total	48	

In year 2021 was 48 people by religion 45 from Greek Catholic Church, 1 from Roman Catholic Church, 1 from Eastern Orthodox Church and 1 from Apostolic Church.
