= Veľkrop =

- Municipality
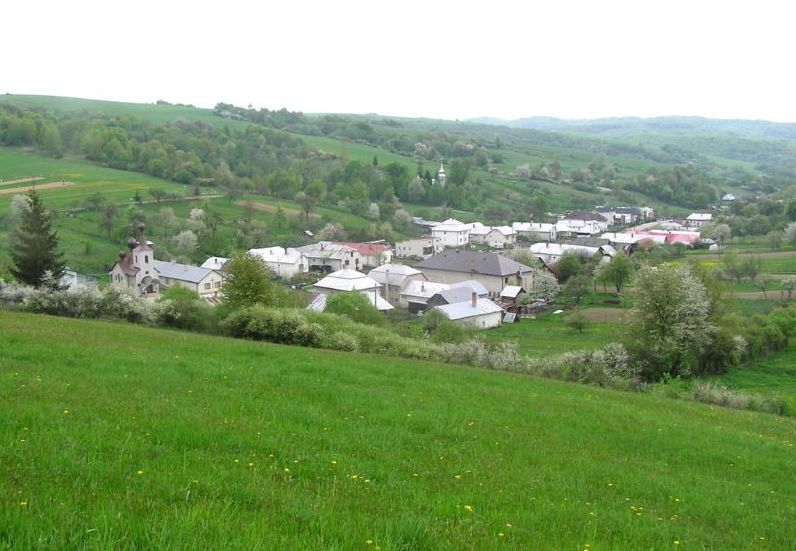

- Flag

- Location of Veľkrop in the Prešov Region Location of Veľkrop in Slovakia
- Coordinates: 49.23°N 21.75°E
- Country: Slovakia
- Region: Prešov Region
- District: Stropkov District
- First mentioned: 1408

Area
  - Total: 10.44 km^{2} (4.03 sq mi)
- Elevation: 283 m (928 ft)

Population (2025)
  - Total: 233
- Time zone: UTC+1 (CET)
  - Summer (DST): UTC+2 (CEST)
- Postal code: 910 1
- Area code: +421 54
- Vehicle registration plate (until 2022): SP
- Website: www.obecvelkrop.sk

Veľkrop (Hungarian: Velkő) is a village and municipality in Stropkov District in the Prešov Region of north-eastern Slovakia.

== History ==
In historical records the village was first mentioned in 1408.

== Geography ==
The municipality lies at an altitude of 283 metres (928 ft) and covers an area of 10.44 km^{2} (4.03 sq mi) (2025).

== Population ==
Population statistic (10 years)
Year	1995	2005	2015	2025
Count	220	218	223	233
Difference		−0.90%	+2.29%	+4.48%

Population statistic
Year	2024	2025
Count	231	233
Difference		+0.86%

It has a population of 233 people (31 December 2025).

=== Ethnicity ===
Census 2021 (1+ %)
Ethnicity	Number	Fraction
Slovak	209	90.47%
Romani	50	21.64%
Rusyn	42	18.18%
Not found out	13	5.62%
Czech	3	1.29%
Total	231	

In year 2021 was 231 people by ethnicity 209 as Slovak, 50 as Romani, 42 as Rusyn, 13 as Not found out and 3 as Czech.

Note on population: The difference values of population numbers in the table "Population statistic" and in the sections "Ethnicity" & "Religion" is caused by the use of various statistical methods.

=== Religion ===
Census 2021 (1+ %)
Religion	Number	Fraction
Eastern Orthodox Church	131	56.71%
Greek Catholic Church	72	31.17%
Roman Catholic Church	14	6.06%
Not found out	10	4.33%
None	3	1.3%
Total	231	

In year 2021 was 231 people by religion 131 from Eastern Orthodox Church, 72 from Greek Catholic Church, 14 from Roman Catholic Church, 10 from Not found out, 3 from None and 1 from Seventh-day Adventist Church.

== World War I cemetery ==
The Club of Military History Beskydy finished its restoration work on the largest war cemetery in Slovakia in 2018. The cemetery is dated to World War I. On Friday, September 28, 2018, it was made accessible to the public. 8862 soldiers of the Austro-Hungarian and Russian armies are buried there. The cemetery is restored in the same style as it was designed in the war times. Natural materials were used for the restoration which was based on historical drawings and sketches that were preserved. The restoration of the cemetery started in 2010 by more than 200 volunteers from Slovakia, Hungary, the Czech Republic, Poland, Ukraine and Romania. Out of the total number of buried soldiers, only 11 of them are known.

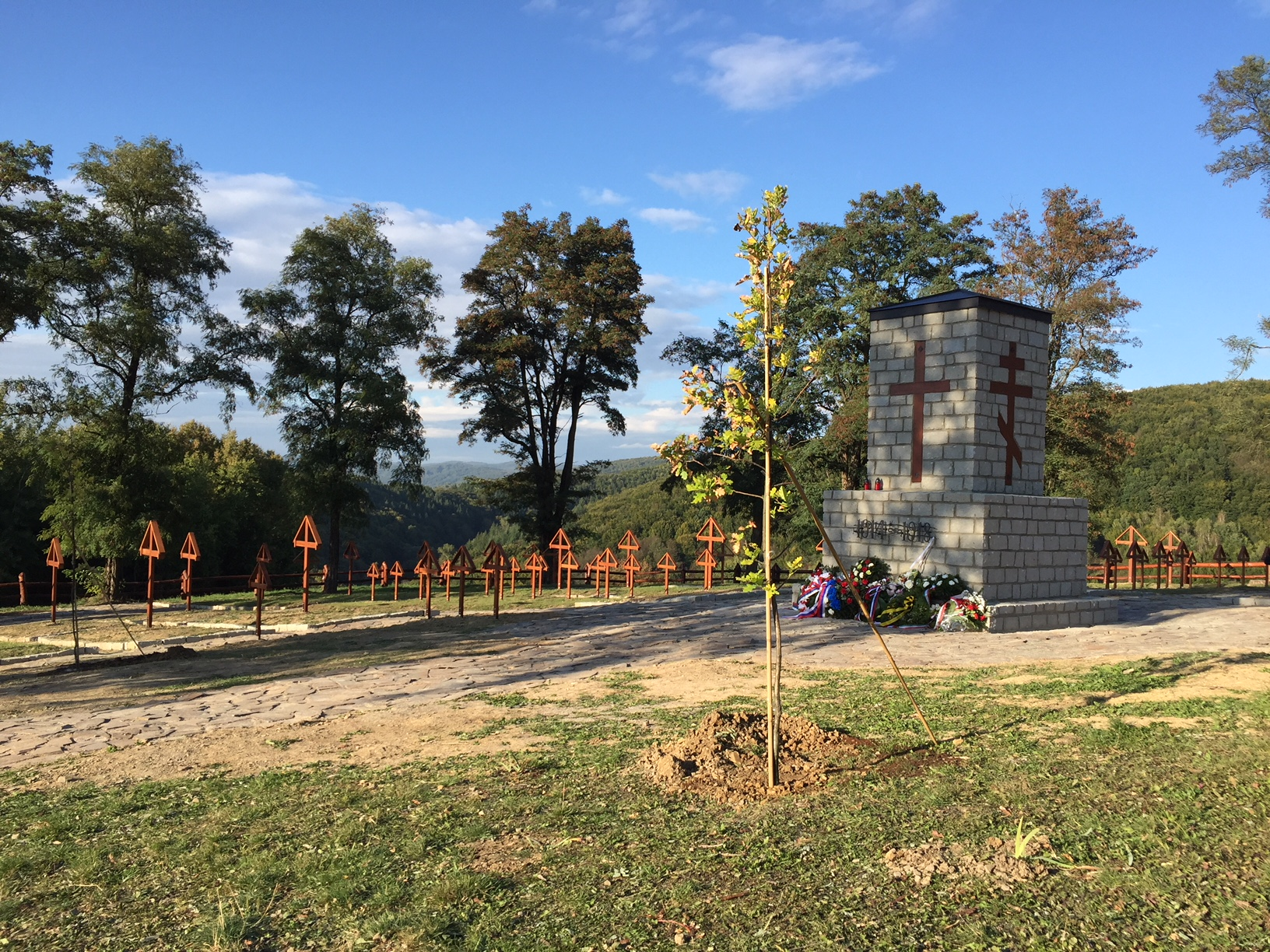
View of the cemetery
