= Kručov =

- Municipality
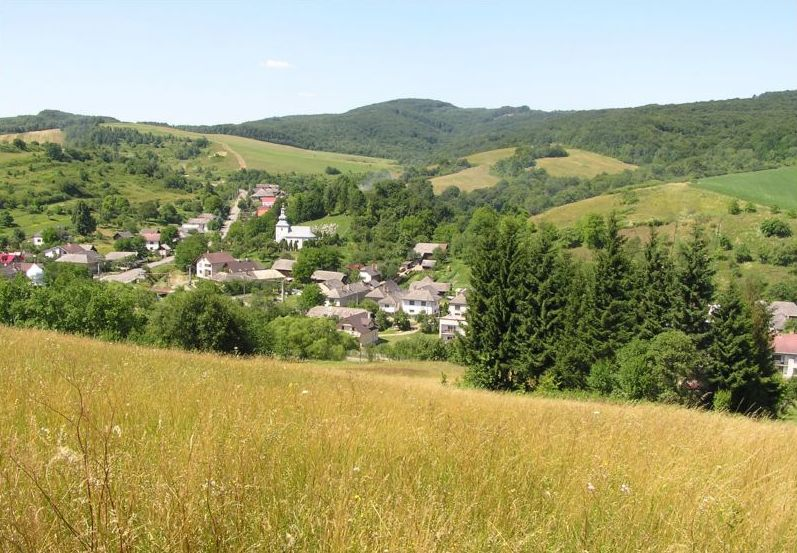

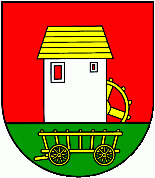
- Flag Coat of arms

- Location of Kručov in the Prešov Region Location of Kručov in Slovakia
- Coordinates: 49.11°N 21.61°E
- Country: Slovakia
- Region: Prešov Region
- District: Stropkov District
- First mentioned: 1390

Area
  - Total: 8.21 km^{2} (3.17 sq mi)
- Elevation: 202 m (663 ft)

Population (2025)
  - Total: 199
- Time zone: UTC+1 (CET)
  - Summer (DST): UTC+2 (CEST)
- Postal code: 903 2
- Area code: +421 54
- Vehicle registration plate (until 2022): SP
- Website: krucov.sk

Kručov (Hungarian: Felsőkrucsó) is a village and municipality in Stropkov District in the Prešov Region of north-eastern Slovakia.

== History ==
In historical records the village was first mentioned in 1390.

== Geography ==
The municipality lies at an altitude of 202 metres (663 ft) and covers an area of 8.21 km^{2} (3.17 sq mi) (2025).

== Population ==
Population statistic (10 years)
Year	1995	2005	2015	2025
Count	244	232	217	199
Difference		−4.91%	−6.46%	−8.29%

Population statistic
Year	2024	2025
Count	202	199
Difference		−1.48%

It has a population of 199 people (31 December 2025).

=== Ethnicity ===
Census 2021 (1+ %)
Ethnicity	Number	Fraction
Slovak	185	89.8%
Rusyn	66	32.03%
Czech	4	1.94%
Total	206	

In year 2021 was 206 people by ethnicity 185 as Slovak, 66 as Rusyn, 4 as Czech, 2 as Austrian, 1 as Russian, 1 as Not found out and 1 as English.

Note on population: The difference values of population numbers in the table "Population statistic" and in the sections "Ethnicity" & "Religion" is caused by the use of various statistical methods.

=== Religion ===
Census 2021 (1+ %)
Religion	Number	Fraction
Greek Catholic Church	142	68.93%
Eastern Orthodox Church	38	18.45%
Roman Catholic Church	16	7.77%
None	10	4.85%
Total	206	

In year 2021 was 206 people by religion 142 from Greek Catholic Church, 38 from Eastern Orthodox Church, 16 from Roman Catholic Church and 10 from None.
