= Vyškovce =

- Municipality
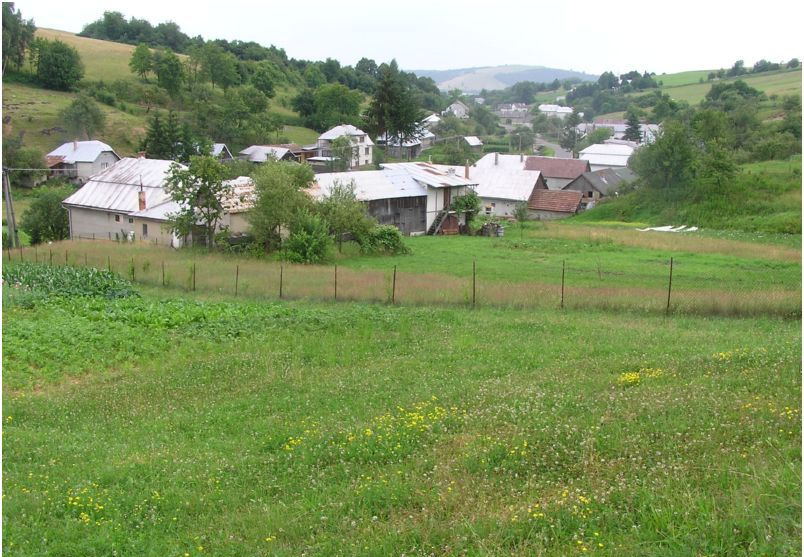

- Location of Vyškovce in the Prešov Region Location of Vyškovce in Slovakia
- Coordinates: 49°15′N 21°40′E
- Country: Slovakia
- Region: Prešov
- District: Stropkov
- First mentioned: 1414

Area
  - Total: 6.62 km^{2} (2.56 sq mi)
- Elevation: 217 m (712 ft)

Population (2025)
  - Total: 117
  - Density: 2.96/km^{2} (7.67/sq mi)
- Time zone: UTC+1 (CET)
  - Summer (DST): UTC+2 (CEST)
- Postal code: 091 01
- Area code: +421 54
- Vehicle registration plate (until 2022): SP
- Website: www.vyskovce.sk

Vyškovce (Hungarian: Viskó) is a village and municipality in Stropkov District in the Prešov Region of north-eastern Slovakia.

== History ==
In historical records the village was first mentioned in 1414.

== Geography ==
The municipality lies at an altitude of 217 metres (712 ft) and covers an area of 6.62 km^{2} (2.56 sq mi) (2025).

== Population ==
Population statistic (10 years)
Year	1995	2005	2015	2025
Count	138	144	134	117
Difference		+4.34%	−6.94%	−12.68%

Population statistic
Year	2024	2025
Count	119	117
Difference		−1.68%

It has a population of 117 people (31 December 2025).

=== Ethnicity ===
Census 2021 (1+ %)
Ethnicity	Number	Fraction
Slovak	100	75.75%
Rusyn	68	51.51%
Romani	16	12.12%
Not found out	6	4.54%
Romanian	3	2.27%
Total	132	

In year 2021 was 132 people by ethnicity 100 as Slovak, 68 as Rusyn, 16 as Romani, 6 as Not found out and 3 as Romanian.

Note on population: The difference values of population numbers in the table "Population statistic" and in the sections "Ethnicity" & "Religion" is caused by the use of various statistical methods.

=== Religion ===
Census 2021 (1+ %)
Religion	Number	Fraction
Greek Catholic Church	105	79.55%
Eastern Orthodox Church	15	11.36%
Roman Catholic Church	6	4.55%
Not found out	5	3.79%
Total	132	

In year 2021 was 132 people by religion 105 from Greek Catholic Church, 15 from Eastern Orthodox Church, 6 from Roman Catholic Church, 5 from Not found out and 1 from None.
