= Bžany, Stropkov District =

Bžany
- Municipality
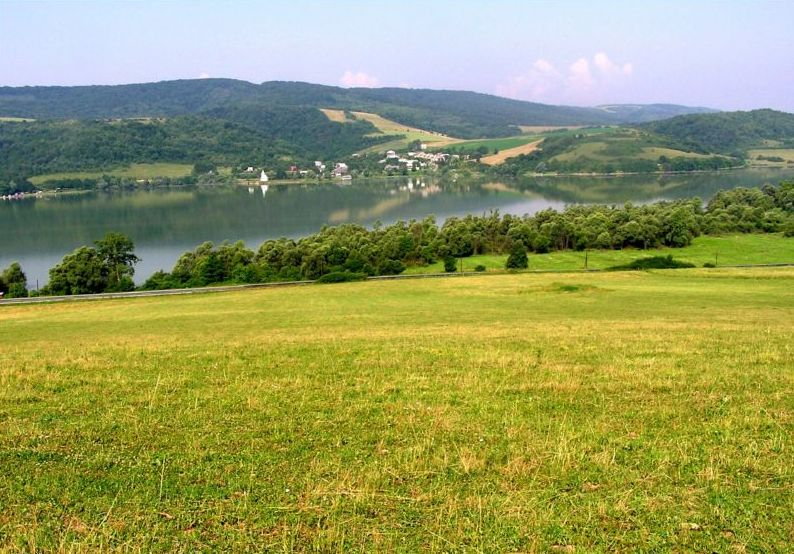

- Flag

- Location of Bžany in the Prešov Region Location of Bžany in Slovakia
- Coordinates: 49.10°N 21.65°E
- Country: Slovakia
- Region: Prešov Region
- District: Stropkov District
- First mentioned: 1410

Area
  - Total: 17.06 km^{2} (6.59 sq mi)
- Elevation: 172 m (564 ft)

Population (2025)
  - Total: 221
- Time zone: UTC+1 (CET)
  - Summer (DST): UTC+2 (CEST)
- Postal code: 903 3
- Area code: +421 54
- Vehicle registration plate (until 2022): SP
- Website: bzany.sk

Bžany (Hungarian: Bodzás; Rusyn: Бжаны) is a village and municipality in Stropkov District in the Prešov Region of north-eastern Slovakia.

== History ==
In historical records the village was first mentioned in 1410.

== Geography ==
The municipality lies at an altitude of 172 metres (564 ft) and covers an area of 17.06 km^{2} (6.59 sq mi) (2025).

== Population ==
Population statistic (10 years)
Year	1995	2005	2015	2025
Count	148	170	165	221
Difference		+14.86%	−2.94%	+33.93%

Population statistic
Year	2024	2025
Count	223	221
Difference		−0.89%

It has a population of 221 people (31 December 2025).

=== Ethnicity ===
Census 2021 (1+ %)
Ethnicity	Number	Fraction
Slovak	199	92.55%
Rusyn	31	14.41%
Romani	26	12.09%
Not found out	6	2.79%
Other	4	1.86%
Czech	3	1.39%
Total	215	

In year 2021 was 215 people by ethnicity 199 as Slovak, 31 as Rusyn, 26 as Romani, 6 as Not found out, 4 as Other, 3 as Czech and 2 as Ukrainian.

Note on population: The difference values of population numbers in the table "Population statistic" and in the sections "Ethnicity" & "Religion" is caused by the use of various statistical methods.

=== Religion ===
Census 2021 (1+ %)
Religion	Number	Fraction
Greek Catholic Church	115	53.49%
Roman Catholic Church	43	20%
None	25	11.63%
Eastern Orthodox Church	24	11.16%
Not found out	4	1.86%
Total	215	

In year 2021 was 215 people by religion 115 from Greek Catholic Church, 43 from Roman Catholic Church, 25 from None, 24 from Eastern Orthodox Church, 4 from Not found out, 1 from Calvinist Church, 1 from Paganism and natural spirituality, 1 from Other and 1 from Ad hoc movements.

== Genealogical resources ==
The records for genealogical research are available at the state archive "Statny Archiv in Presov, Slovakia"

- Roman Catholic church records (births/marriages/deaths): 1802-1895 (parish B)

== See also ==
- List of municipalities and towns in Slovakia
