= Gribov =

- Municipality
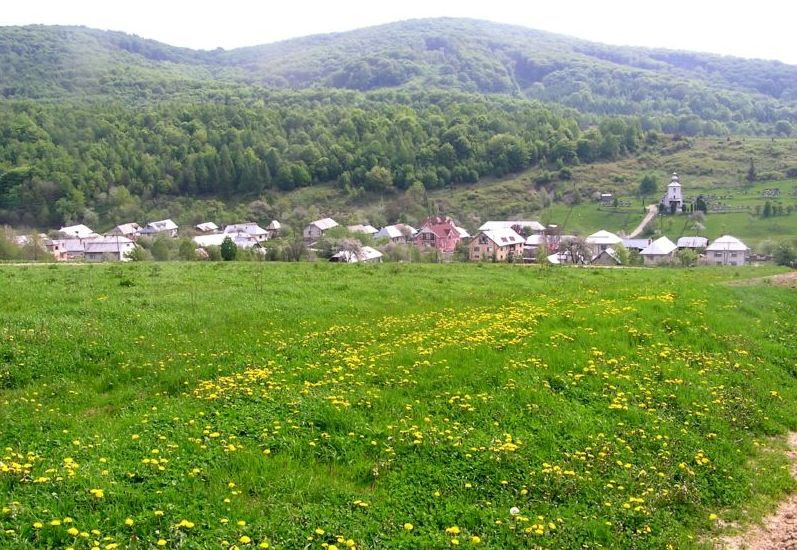

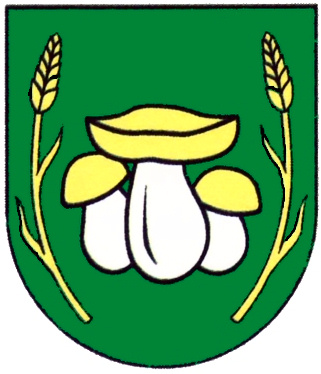
- Flag Coat of arms

- Location of Gribov in the Prešov Region Location of Gribov in Slovakia
- Coordinates: 49.28°N 21.72°E
- Country: Slovakia
- Region: Prešov Region
- District: Stropkov District
- First mentioned: 1414

Area
  - Total: 7.94 km^{2} (3.07 sq mi)
- Elevation: 278 m (912 ft)

Population (2025)
  - Total: 187
- Time zone: UTC+1 (CET)
  - Summer (DST): UTC+2 (CEST)
- Postal code: 902 2
- Area code: +421 54
- Vehicle registration plate (until 2022): SP
- Website: www.obecgribov.sk

Gribov (Rusyn: Ґрибів; Hungarian: Kisgombás) is a village and municipality in Stropkov District in the Prešov Region of north-eastern Slovakia.

== History ==
In historical records the village was first mentioned in 1414.

== Geography ==
The municipality lies at an altitude of 278 metres (912 ft) and covers an area of 7.94 km^{2} (3.07 sq mi) (2025).

== Population ==
Population statistic (10 years)
Year	1995	2005	2015	2025
Count	194	191	200	187
Difference		−1.54%	+4.71%	−6.5%

Population statistic
Year	2024	2025
Count	185	187
Difference		+1.08%

It has a population of 187 people (31 December 2025).

=== Ethnicity ===
Census 2021 (1+ %)
Ethnicity	Number	Fraction
Slovak	162	85.71%
Rusyn	59	31.21%
Romani	11	5.82%
Not found out	11	5.82%
Total	189	

In year 2021 was 189 people by ethnicity 162 as Slovak, 59 as Rusyn, 11 as Romani and 11 as Not found out.

Note on population: The difference values of population numbers in the table "Population statistic" and in the sections "Ethnicity" & "Religion" is caused by the use of various statistical methods.

=== Religion ===
Census 2021 (1+ %)
Religion	Number	Fraction
Greek Catholic Church	148	78.31%
Eastern Orthodox Church	18	9.52%
Roman Catholic Church	9	4.76%
Not found out	9	4.76%
None	3	1.59%
Total	189	

In year 2021 was 189 people by religion 148 from Greek Catholic Church, 18 from Eastern Orthodox Church, 9 from Roman Catholic Church, 9 from Not found out, 3 from None, 1 from Christian Congregations in Slovakia and 1 from Evangelical Church.
