= Hatne =

Hatne may refer to:

- Hatné, a village and municipality in Slovakia
- Hatne, Ukraine, a village
- Hatane or Hatne, a village in India
