= Čelko =

Čelko, Celko or Chelko is a surname of Slovak origin. Today the Čelko surname is still primarily found in Slovakia but a few branches of the family line can also be found in areas of United States (Brackenridge, PA and West Natrona, PA) and Argentina.

== Origin ==
The name originates from small village Čelkova Lehota (Hungarian: Cselkó-Szabadja, it means "Čelko's settlement") in Považská Bystrica District in Trenčín Region of north-western Slovakia. The village has about 140 - 150 inhabitants, mostly with the Čelko surname.

== People with the surname ==
- Joe Celko, American relational database expert
- Vojtech Čelko (born 1946), Slovak and Czech historian
