= Jasenica (village) =

Municipality in Trenčín Region, Slovakia

- Municipality
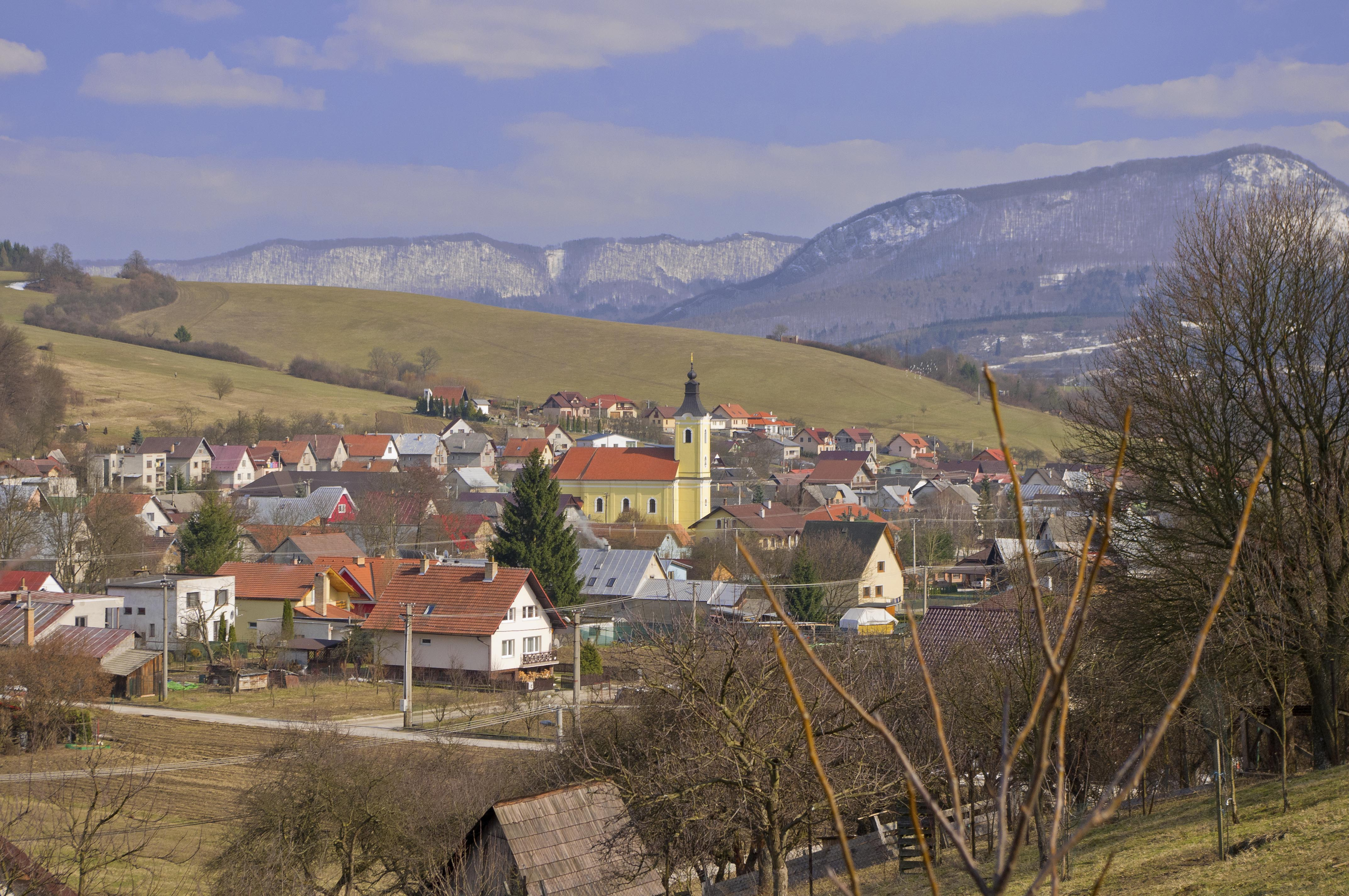
- Jasenica Village and Súľov hills

- Flag Coat of arms

- Location of Jasenica in the Trenčín Region Location of Jasenica in Slovakia
- Coordinates: 49°10′47″N 18°27′00″E
- Country: Slovakia
- Region: Trenčín Region
- District: Považská Bystrica District
- First mentioned: 1269

Area
  - Total: 7.29 km^{2} (2.81 sq mi)
- Elevation: 312 m (1,024 ft)

Population (2025)
  - Total: 1,274
- Time zone: UTC+1 (CET)
  - Summer (DST): UTC+2 (CEST)
- Postal code: 181 7
- Area code: +421 42
- Vehicle registration plate (until 2022): PB
- Website: www.jasenica.sk

Jasenica (Hungarian: Jeszence) is a village and municipality in Považská Bystrica District in the Trenčín Region of north-western Slovakia.

== History ==
In historical records the village was first mentioned in 1269.

== Geography ==
Jasenica is lying in Považie region in Papradno valley among four hills Hradište, Dúbrava, Súdna and Lopušná. Across this valley flows river called Papradnianka. The municipality lies at an altitude of 312 metres (1,024 ft) and covers an area of 7.29 km^{2} (2.81 sq mi) (2025).

== Population ==
Population statistic (10 years)
Year	1995	2005	2015	2025
Count	952	969	1075	1274
Difference		+1.78%	+10.93%	+18.51%

Population statistic
Year	2024	2025
Count	1245	1274
Difference		+2.32%

It has a population of 1274 people (31 December 2025).

=== Ethnicity ===
Census 2021 (1+ %)
Ethnicity	Number	Fraction
Slovak	1138	95.54%
Not found out	54	4.53%
Total	1191	

In year 2021 was 1191 people by ethnicity 1138 as Slovak, 54 as Not found out, 10 as Czech, 2 as Russian, 1 as Romani, 1 as Rusyn, 1 as German and 1 as Bulgarian.

Note on population: The difference values of population numbers in the table "Population statistic" and in the sections "Ethnicity" & "Religion" is caused by the use of various statistical methods.

=== Religion ===
Census 2021 (1+ %)
Religion	Number	Fraction
Roman Catholic Church	953	80.02%
None	141	11.84%
Not found out	48	4.03%
Total	1191	

In year 2021 was 1191 people by religion 953 from Roman Catholic Church, 141 from None, 48 from Not found out, 9 from Other and not ascertained christian church, 8 from Evangelical Church, 8 from Ad hoc movements, 7 from Greek Catholic Church, 6 from Other, 5 from Calvinist Church, 2 from Buddhism, 1 from Eastern Orthodox Church, 1 from Christian Congregations in Slovakia, 1 from Hinduism and 1 from Seventh-day Adventist Church.

== Religion ==
In village is Roman Catholic parish of St. Michael Archangel where two next village belong: Stupné and Podvažie. Parish church is Church of St. Michael Archangel in Jasenica.

== Genealogical resources ==
The records for genealogical research are available at the state archive "Statny Archiv in Bytca, Slovakia"

- Roman Catholic church records (births/marriages/deaths): 1717-1895 (parish A)

== See also ==
- List of municipalities and towns in Slovakia
