= Čelkova Lehota =

- Municipality
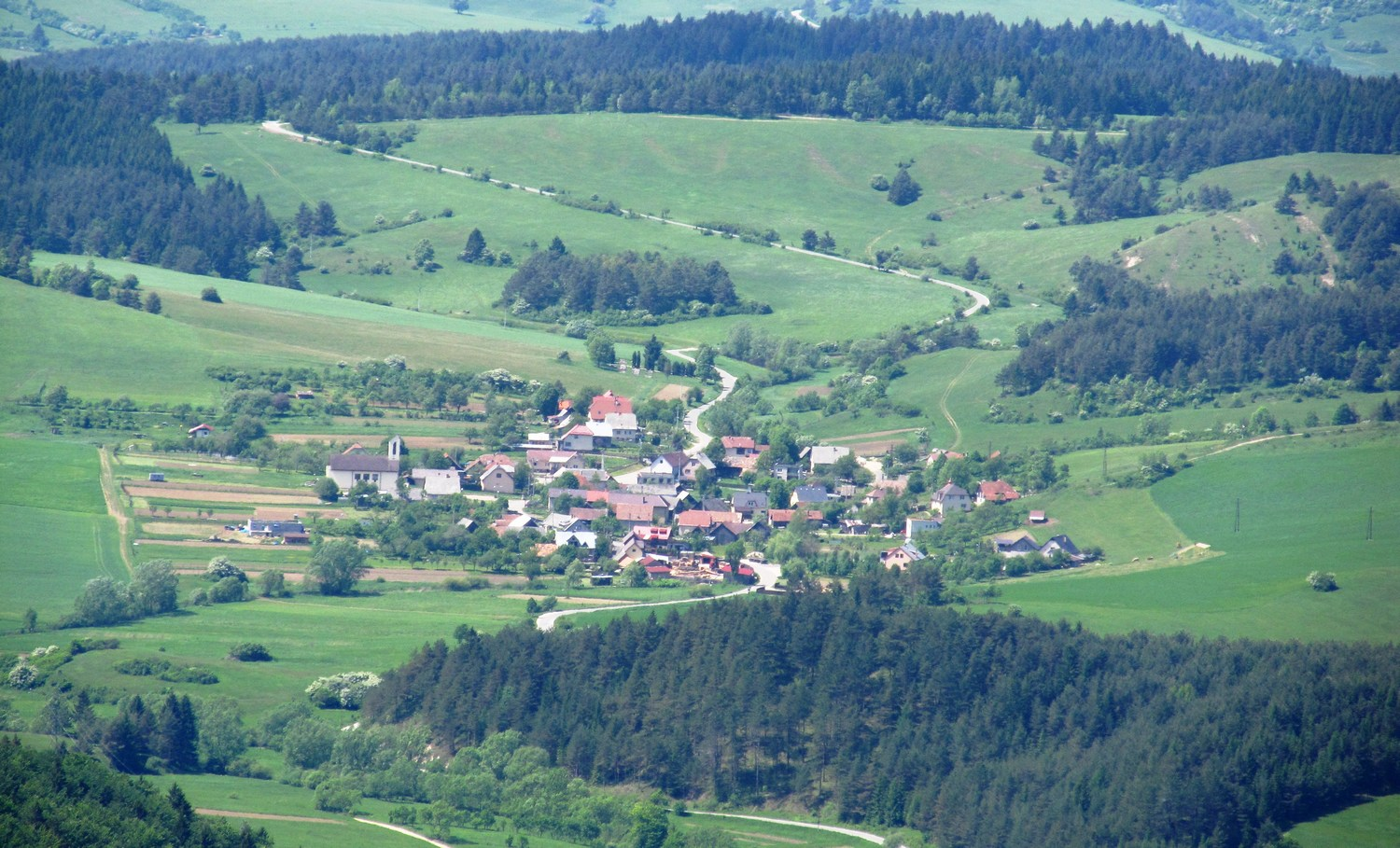

- Flag

- Location of Čelkova Lehota in the Trenčín Region Location of Čelkova Lehota in Slovakia
- Coordinates: 49.02°N 18.53°E
- Country: Slovakia
- Region: Trenčín Region
- District: Považská Bystrica District
- First mentioned: 1471

Area
  - Total: 3.70 km^{2} (1.43 sq mi)
- Elevation: 449 m (1,473 ft)

Population (2025)
  - Total: 157
- Time zone: UTC+1 (CET)
  - Summer (DST): UTC+2 (CEST)
- Postal code: 181 6
- Area code: +421 42
- Vehicle registration plate (until 2022): PB
- Website: celkovalehota.sk

Čelkova Lehota (Hungarian: Cselkószabadja) is a village and municipality in Považská Bystrica District in the Trenčín Region of north-western Slovakia.

The village lies in a natural environment near Strážovské vrchy mountain range at the end of Domaniža valley.

== History ==
In historical records the village was first mentioned in 1471.

== Geography ==
The municipality lies at an altitude of 449 metres (1,473 ft) and covers an area of 3.70 km^{2} (1.43 sq mi) (2025).

== Population ==
Population statistic (10 years)
Year	1995	2005	2015	2025
Count	142	141	140	157
Difference		−0.70%	−0.70%	+12.14%

Population statistic
Year	2024	2025
Count	160	157
Difference		−1.87%

It has a population of 157 people (31 December 2025).

=== Ethnicity ===
Census 2021 (1+ %)
Ethnicity	Number	Fraction
Slovak	147	99.32%
Not found out	2	1.35%
Total	148	

In year 2021 was 148 people by ethnicity 147 as Slovak, 2 as Not found out and 1 as Romani.

Note on population: The difference values of population numbers in the table "Population statistic" and in the sections "Ethnicity" & "Religion" is caused by the use of various statistical methods.

=== Religion ===
Census 2021 (1+ %)
Religion	Number	Fraction
Roman Catholic Church	124	83.78%
None	18	12.16%
Not found out	5	3.38%
Total	148	

In year 2021 was 148 people by religion 124 from Roman Catholic Church, 18 from None, 5 from Not found out and 1 from Ad hoc movements.

== Genealogical resources ==
The records for genealogical research are available at the state archive "Statny Archiv in Bytca, Slovakia"

- Roman Catholic church records (births/marriages/deaths): 1670-1894 (parish B)

== See also ==
- Čelko
- List of municipalities and towns in Slovakia
