= Bodiná =

- Municipality
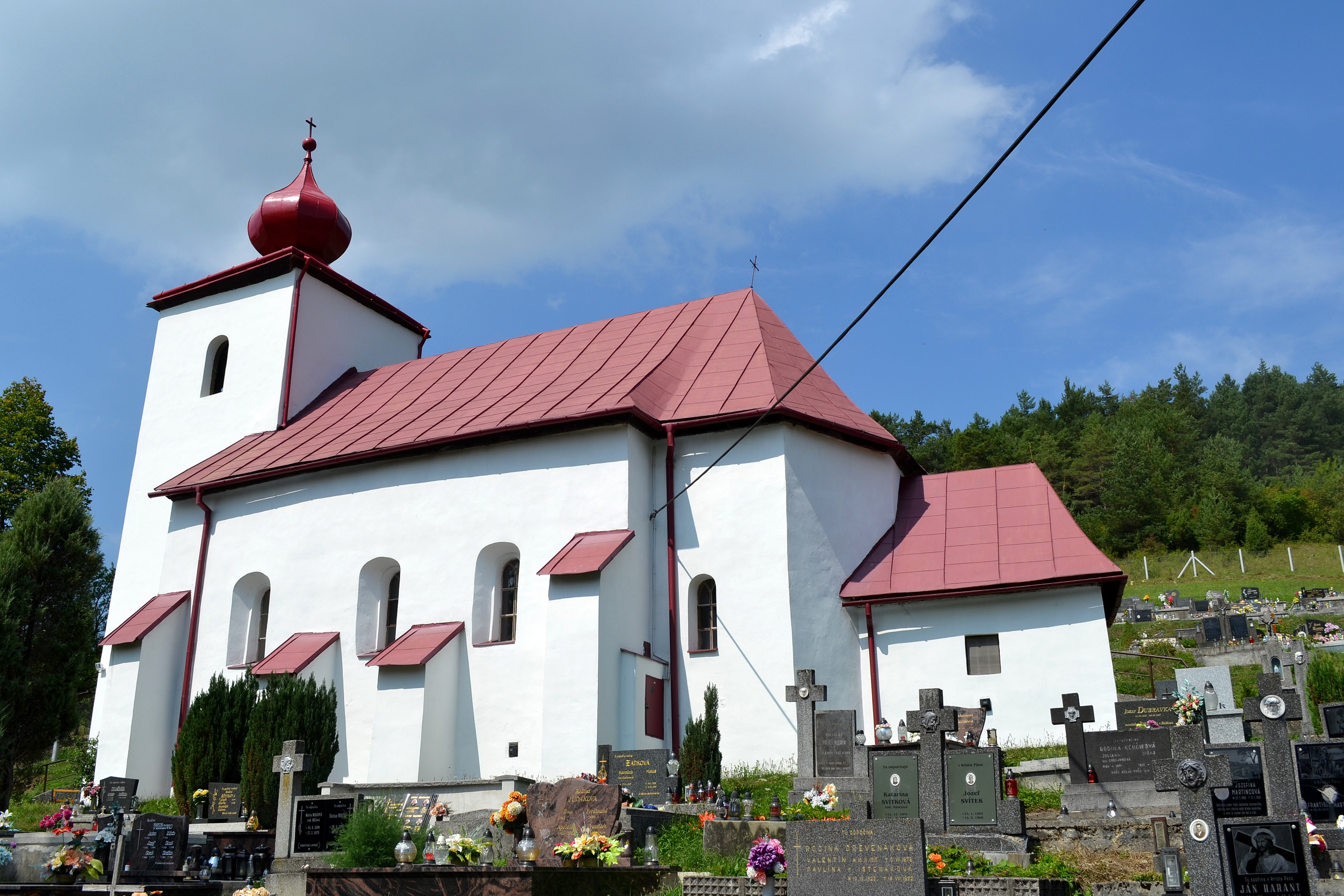

- Flag

- Location of Bodiná in the Trenčín Region Location of Bodiná in Slovakia
- Coordinates: 49.10°N 18.57°E
- Country: Slovakia
- Region: Trenčín Region
- District: Považská Bystrica District
- First mentioned: 1345

Area
  - Total: 7.47 km^{2} (2.88 sq mi)
- Elevation: 411 m (1,348 ft)

Population (2025)
  - Total: 476
- Time zone: UTC+1 (CET)
  - Summer (DST): UTC+2 (CEST)
- Postal code: 181 5
- Area code: +421 42
- Vehicle registration plate (until 2022): PB
- Website: www.bodina.eu

Bodiná (Hungarian: Bogyós) is a village and municipality in Považská Bystrica District in the Trenčín Region of north-western Slovakia.

== History ==
In historical records the village was first mentioned in 1345.

== Geography ==
The municipality lies at an altitude of 411 metres (1,348 ft) and covers an area of 7.47 km^{2} (2.88 sq mi) (2025).

== Population ==
Population statistic (10 years)
Year	1995	2005	2015	2025
Count	478	485	488	476
Difference		+1.46%	+0.61%	−2.45%

Population statistic
Year	2024	2025
Count	480	476
Difference		−0.83%

It has a population of 476 people (31 December 2025).

=== Ethnicity ===
Census 2021 (1+ %)
Ethnicity	Number	Fraction
Slovak	484	98.17%
Not found out	10	2.02%
Moravian	6	1.21%
Total	493	

In year 2021 was 493 people by ethnicity 484 as Slovak, 10 as Not found out, 6 as Moravian, 2 as Other, 1 as Czech and 1 as Polish.

Note on population: The difference values of population numbers in the table "Population statistic" and in the sections "Ethnicity" & "Religion" is caused by the use of various statistical methods.

=== Religion ===
Census 2021 (1+ %)
Religion	Number	Fraction
Roman Catholic Church	381	77.28%
None	51	10.34%
Evangelical Church	47	9.53%
Not found out	6	1.22%
Total	493	

In year 2021 was 493 people by religion 381 from Roman Catholic Church, 51 from None, 47 from Evangelical Church, 6 from Not found out, 3 from Other and not ascertained christian church, 2 from Greek Catholic Church, 1 from Jehovah's Witnesses, 1 from Hinduism and 1 from Ad hoc movements.

== Genealogical resources ==
The records for genealogical research are available at the state archive "Statny Archiv in Bytca, Slovakia"

- Roman Catholic church records (births/marriages/deaths): 1670-1899 (parish B)
- Lutheran church records (births/marriages/deaths): 1801-1907 (parish B)

== See also ==
- List of municipalities and towns in Slovakia
