= Prečín =

- Municipality
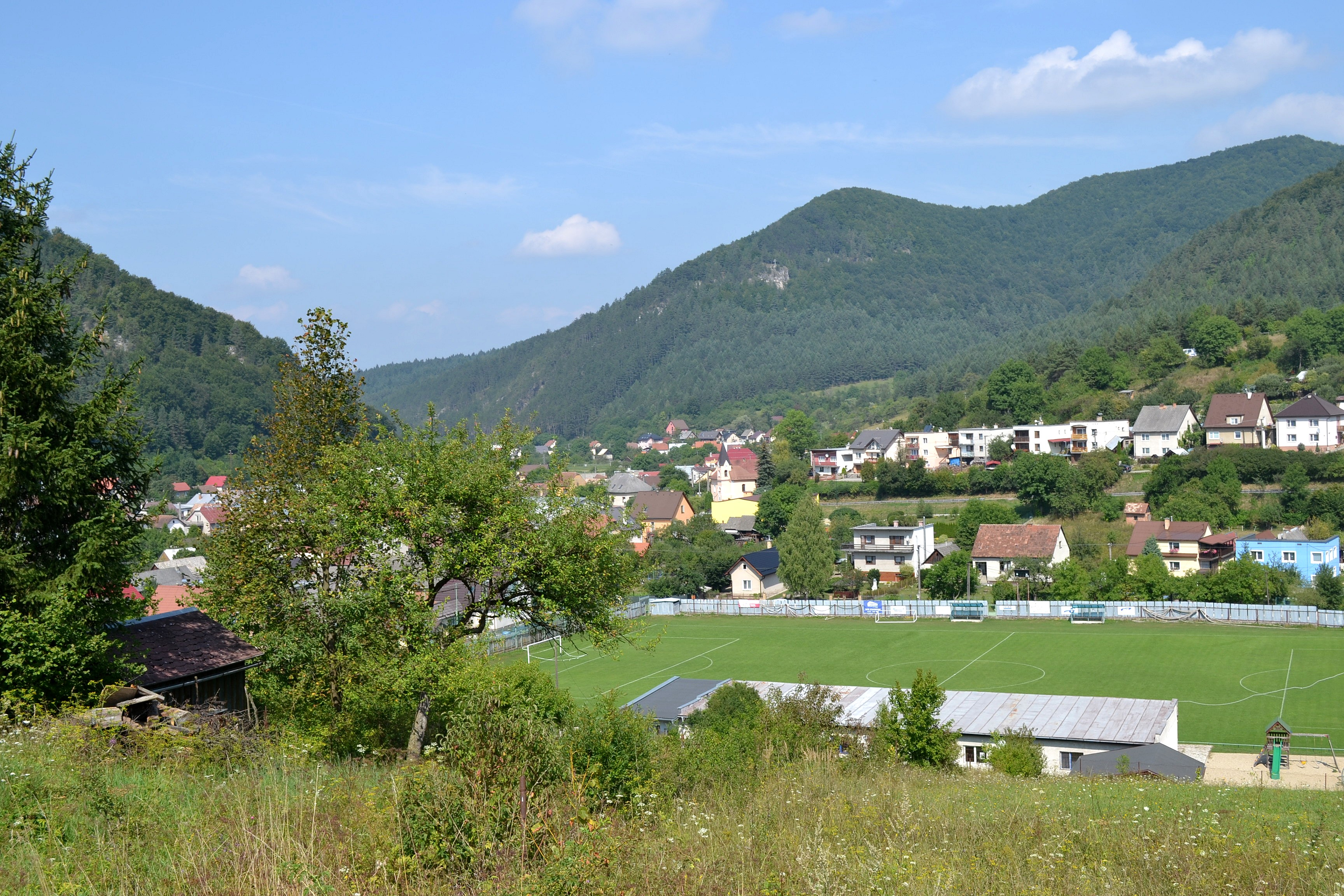

- Flag

- Location of Prečín in the Trenčín Region Location of Prečín in Slovakia
- Coordinates: 49.08°N 18.53°E
- Country: Slovakia
- Region: Trenčín Region
- District: Považská Bystrica District
- First mentioned: 1385

Area
  - Total: 17.63 km^{2} (6.81 sq mi)
- Elevation: 400 m (1,300 ft)

Population (2025)
  - Total: 1,555
- Time zone: UTC+1 (CET)
  - Summer (DST): UTC+2 (CEST)
- Postal code: 181 5
- Area code: +421 42
- Vehicle registration plate (until 2022): PB
- Website: www.precin.eu

Prečín (Hungarian: Soltészperecsény) is a village and municipality in Považská Bystrica District in the Trenčín Region in North-Western Slovakia.

== History ==
The first mention of the municipality in historical records is dated 1385. There are two churches, one from the 16th century and another from the 20th century.

== Geography ==
The municipality lies at an altitude of 400 metres (1,300 ft) and covers an area of 17.63 km^{2} (6.81 sq mi) (2025).

== Population ==
Population statistic (10 years)
Year	1995	2005	2015	2025
Count	1268	1391	1450	1555
Difference		+9.70%	+4.24%	+7.24%

Population statistic
Year	2024	2025
Count	1561	1555
Difference		−0.38%

It has a population of 1555 people (31 December 2025).

=== Ethnicity ===
Census 2021 (1+ %)
Ethnicity	Number	Fraction
Slovak	1446	95.76%
Not found out	53	3.5%
Czech	20	1.32%
Total	1510	

In year 2021 was 1510 people by ethnicity 1446 as Slovak, 53 as Not found out, 20 as Czech, 13 as Moravian, 7 as Other, 3 as Hungarian, 2 as Ukrainian, 2 as Russian, 1 as Serbian, 1 as Austrian and 1 as Croatian.

Note on population: The difference values of population numbers in the table "Population statistic" and in the sections "Ethnicity" & "Religion" is caused by the use of various statistical methods.

=== Religion ===
Census 2021 (1+ %)
Religion	Number	Fraction
Roman Catholic Church	1163	77.02%
None	224	14.83%
Not found out	67	4.44%
Total	1510	

In year 2021 was 1510 people by religion 1163 from Roman Catholic Church, 224 from None, 67 from Not found out, 13 from Evangelical Church, 11 from Other and not ascertained christian church, 7 from Greek Catholic Church, 6 from Ad hoc movements, 5 from Other, 4 from Christian Congregations in Slovakia, 4 from Buddhism, 4 from Apostolic Church, 1 from Eastern Orthodox Church and 1 from Paganism and natural spirituality.
