= Malé Lednice =

- Municipality
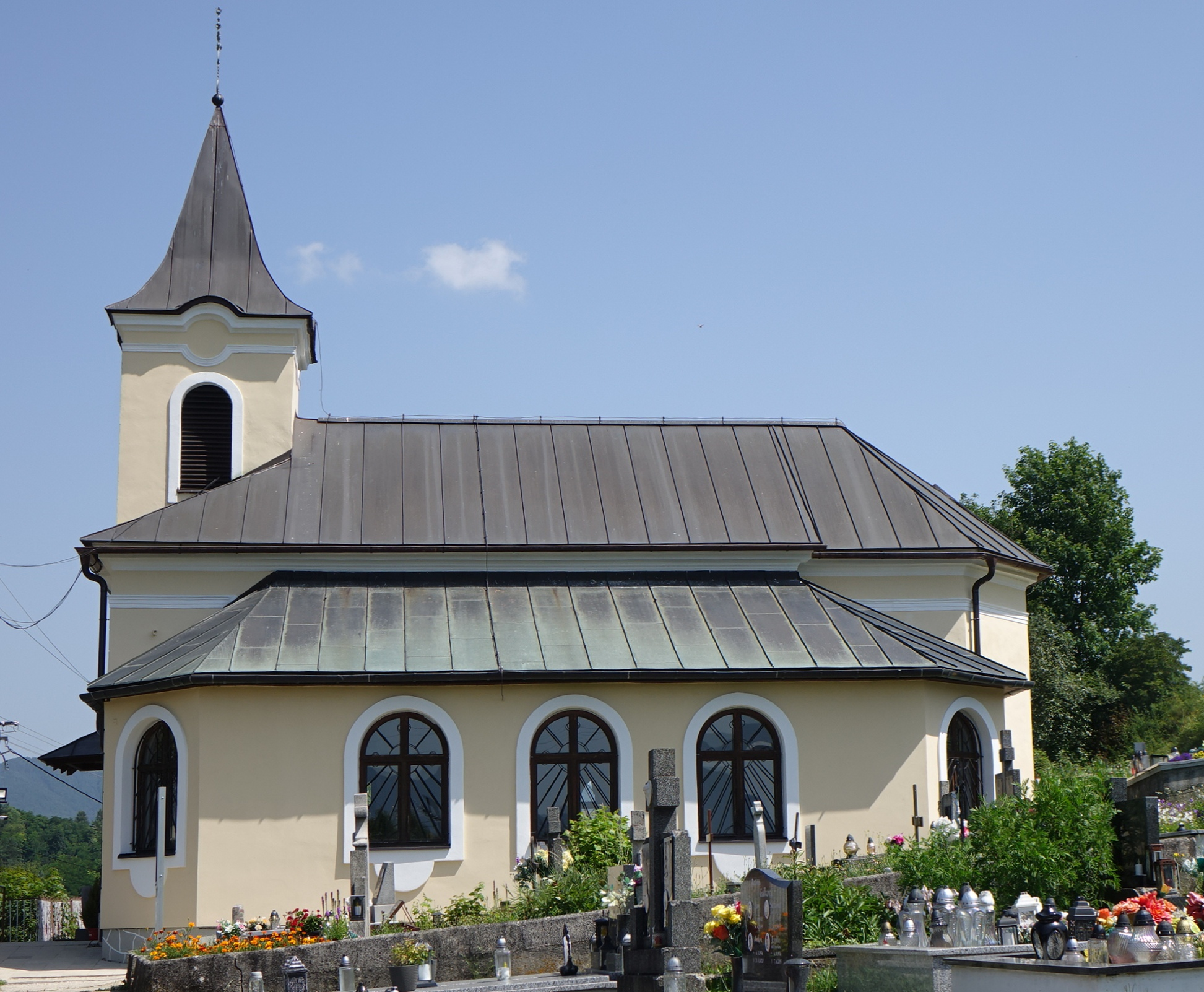

- Flag

- Location of Malé Lednice in the Trenčín Region Location of Malé Lednice in Slovakia
- Coordinates: 49.07°N 18.57°E
- Country: Slovakia
- Region: Trenčín Region
- District: Považská Bystrica District
- First mentioned: 1339

Area
  - Total: 14.99 km^{2} (5.79 sq mi)
- Elevation: 418 m (1,371 ft)

Population (2025)
  - Total: 493
- Time zone: UTC+1 (CET)
  - Summer (DST): UTC+2 (CEST)
- Postal code: 181 6
- Area code: +421 42
- Vehicle registration plate (until 2022): PB
- Website: www.malelednice.sk

Malé Lednice (Hungarian: Kislednic) is a village and municipality in Považská Bystrica District in the Trenčín Region of north-western Slovakia.

== History ==
In historical records the village was first mentioned in 1339.

== Geography ==
The municipality lies at an altitude of 418 metres (1,371 ft) and covers an area of 14.99 km^{2} (5.79 sq mi) (2025).

== Population ==
Population statistic (10 years)
Year	1995	2005	2015	2025
Count	545	522	512	493
Difference		−4.22%	−1.91%	−3.71%

Population statistic
Year	2024	2025
Count	494	493
Difference		−0.20%

It has a population of 493 people (31 December 2025).

=== Ethnicity ===
Census 2021 (1+ %)
Ethnicity	Number	Fraction
Slovak	476	99.16%
Not found out	6	1.25%
Total	480	

In year 2021 was 480 people by ethnicity 476 as Slovak, 6 as Not found out, 3 as Czech, 2 as Other, 1 as Rusyn, 1 as Russian, 1 as Moravian and 1 as Greek.

Note on population: The difference values of population numbers in the table "Population statistic" and in the sections "Ethnicity" & "Religion" is caused by the use of various statistical methods.

=== Religion ===
Census 2021 (1+ %)
Religion	Number	Fraction
Roman Catholic Church	447	93.13%
None	25	5.21%
Total	480	

In year 2021 was 480 people by religion 447 from Roman Catholic Church, 25 from None, 3 from Not found out, 2 from Greek Catholic Church, 1 from Eastern Orthodox Church, 1 from Other and 1 from Evangelical Church.
