= Horná Mariková =

- Municipality
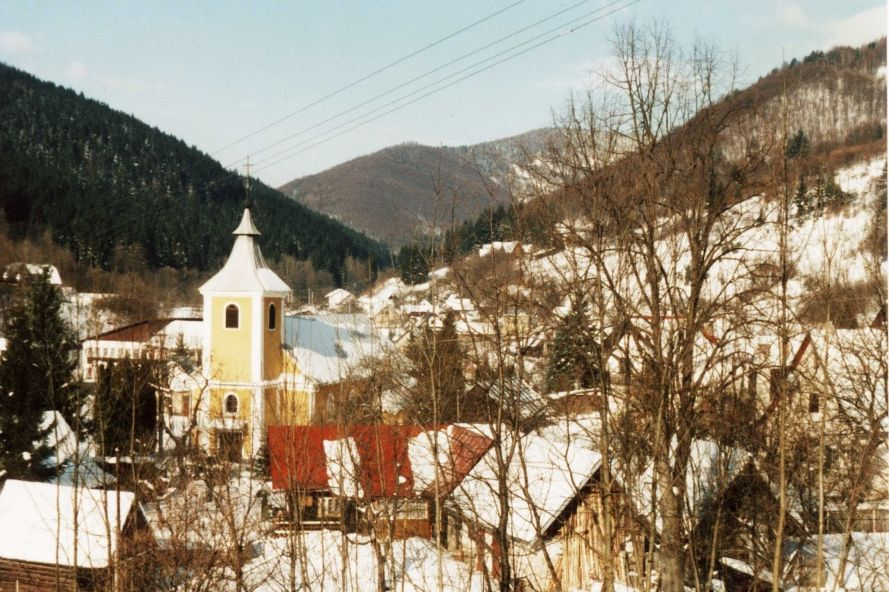

- Flag

- Location of Horná Mariková in the Trenčín Region Location of Horná Mariková in Slovakia
- Coordinates: 49.25°N 18.32°E
- Country: Slovakia
- Region: Trenčín Region
- District: Považská Bystrica District
- First mentioned: 1828

Area
  - Total: 47.54 km^{2} (18.36 sq mi)
- Elevation: 530 m (1,740 ft)

Population (2025)
  - Total: 589
- Time zone: UTC+1 (CET)
  - Summer (DST): UTC+2 (CEST)
- Postal code: 180 3
- Area code: +421 42
- Vehicle registration plate (until 2022): PB
- Website: www.hornamarikova.sk

Horná Mariková (Hungarian: Felsőmarikó) is a village and municipality in Považská Bystrica District in the Trenčín Region of north-western Slovakia.

== History ==
In historical records the village as Horná Mariková was first mentioned in 1828 but first sign of existence is from 1321.

== Geography ==
The municipality lies at an altitude of 530 metres (1,740 ft) and covers an area of 47.54 km^{2} (18.36 sq mi) (2025).

== Population ==
Population statistic (10 years)
Year	1995	2005	2015	2025
Count	894	734	603	589
Difference		−17.89%	−17.84%	−2.32%

Population statistic
Year	2024	2025
Count	583	589
Difference		+1.02%

It has a population of 589 people (31 December 2025).

=== Ethnicity ===
Census 2021 (1+ %)
Ethnicity	Number	Fraction
Slovak	550	95.48%
Not found out	22	3.81%
Czech	6	1.04%
Total	576	

In year 2021 was 576 people by ethnicity 550 as Slovak, 22 as Not found out, 6 as Czech, 4 as Other and 3 as Russian.

Note on population: The difference values of population numbers in the table "Population statistic" and in the sections "Ethnicity" & "Religion" is caused by the use of various statistical methods.

=== Religion ===
Census 2021 (1+ %)
Religion	Number	Fraction
Roman Catholic Church	457	79.34%
None	77	13.37%
Not found out	24	4.17%
Total	576	

In year 2021 was 576 people by religion 457 from Roman Catholic Church, 77 from None, 24 from Not found out, 4 from Paganism and natural spirituality, 3 from Christian Congregations in Slovakia, 3 from Other, 3 from Greek Catholic Church, 2 from Ad hoc movements, 1 from Eastern Orthodox Church, 1 from Evangelical Church and 1 from Apostolic Church.

== Genealogical resources ==
The records for genealogical research are available at the state archive "Statny Archiv in Bytca, Slovakia"

- Roman Catholic church records (births/marriages/deaths): 1756-1918 (parish A)

== See also ==
- List of municipalities and towns in Slovakia
