= Sádočné =

- Municipality
- Flag

- Location of Sádočné in the Trenčín Region Location of Sádočné in Slovakia
- Coordinates: 49.02°N 18.55°E
- Country: Slovakia
- Region: Trenčín Region
- District: Považská Bystrica District
- First mentioned: 1339

Area
  - Total: 7.50 km^{2} (2.90 sq mi)
- Elevation: 415 m (1,362 ft)

Population (2025)
  - Total: 159
- Time zone: UTC+1 (CET)
  - Summer (DST): UTC+2 (CEST)
- Postal code: 181 6
- Area code: +421 42
- Vehicle registration plate (until 2022): PB
- Website: www.sadocne.dcom.sk

Sádočné (Hungarian: Sádecsne) is a village and municipality in Považská Bystrica District in the Trenčín Region of north-western Slovakia.

== History ==
In historical records the village was first mentioned in 1339.

== Geography ==
The municipality lies at an altitude of 415 metres (1,362 ft) and covers an area of 7.50 km^{2} (2.90 sq mi) (2025).

== Population ==
Population statistic (10 years)
Year	1995	2005	2015	2025
Count	177	163	162	159
Difference		−7.90%	−0.61%	−1.85%

Population statistic
Year	2024	2025
Count	158	159
Difference		+0.63%

It has a population of 159 people (31 December 2025).

=== Ethnicity ===
Census 2021 (1+ %)
Ethnicity	Number	Fraction
Slovak	154	99.35%
Total	155	

In year 2021 was 155 people by ethnicity 154 as Slovak and 1 as Not found out.

Note on population: The difference values of population numbers in the table "Population statistic" and in the sections "Ethnicity" & "Religion" is caused by the use of various statistical methods.

=== Religion ===
Census 2021 (1+ %)
Religion	Number	Fraction
Roman Catholic Church	136	87.74%
None	16	10.32%
Total	155	

In year 2021 was 155 people by religion 136 from Roman Catholic Church, 16 from None, 1 from Eastern Orthodox Church, 1 from Not found out and 1 from Evangelical Church.
