= Horný Lieskov =

- Municipality
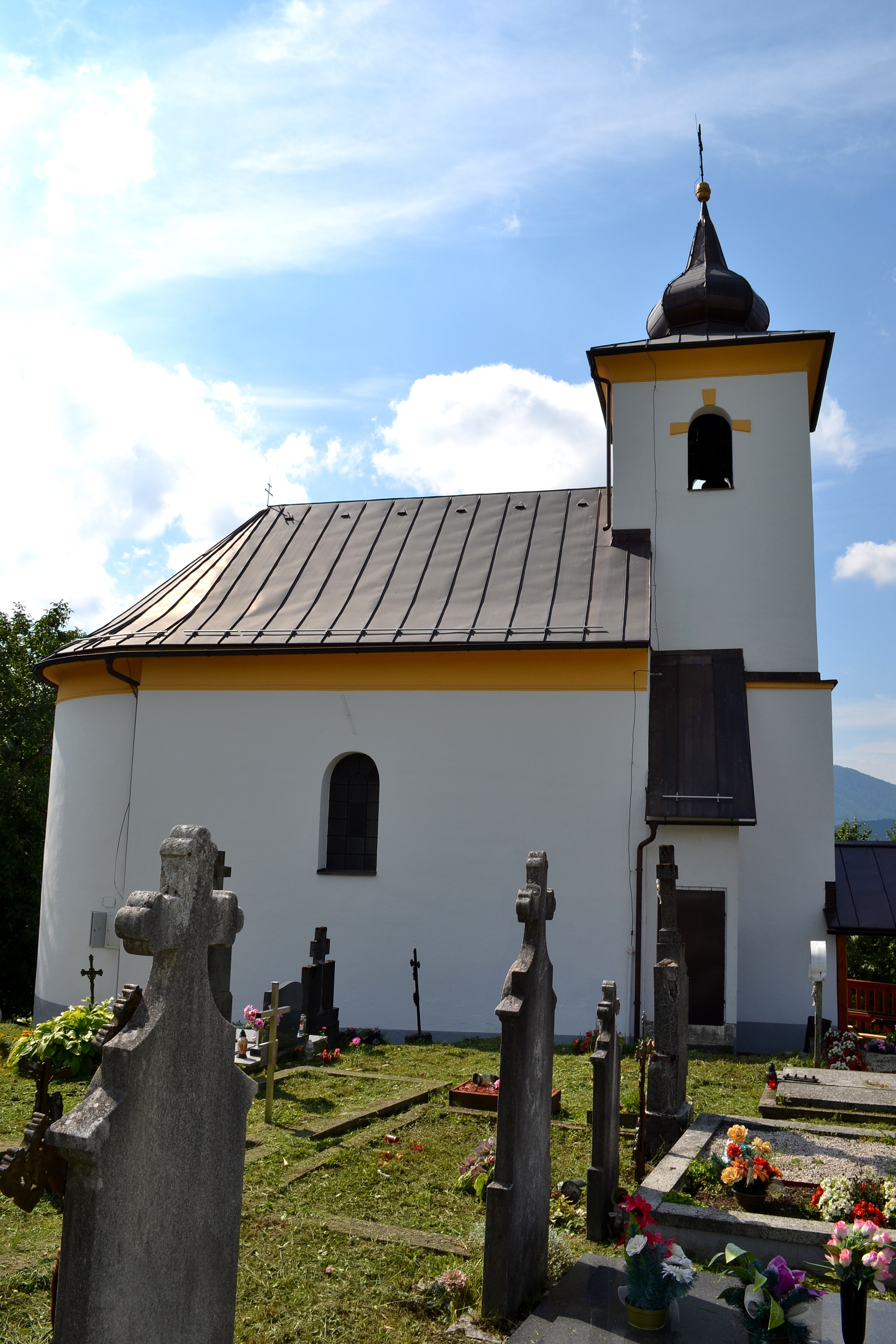

- Flag

- Location of Horný Lieskov in the Trenčín Region Location of Horný Lieskov in Slovakia
- Coordinates: 49.07°N 18.43°E
- Country: Slovakia
- Region: Trenčín Region
- District: Považská Bystrica District
- First mentioned: 1330

Area
  - Total: 4.89 km^{2} (1.89 sq mi)
- Elevation: 355 m (1,165 ft)

Population (2025)
  - Total: 507
- Time zone: UTC+1 (CET)
  - Summer (DST): UTC+2 (CEST)
- Postal code: 182 1
- Area code: +421 42
- Vehicle registration plate (until 2022): PB
- Website: hornylieskov.sk

Horný Lieskov (Slovak pronunciation: [ˈɦɔrniː ˈlɪeskɔw]; Hungarian: Felsőmogyoród) is a village and municipality in Považská Bystrica District in the Trenčín Region of north-western Slovakia.

== History ==
In historical records the village was first mentioned in 1330.

== Geography ==
The municipality lies at an altitude of 355 metres (1,165 ft) and covers an area of 4.89 km^{2} (1.89 sq mi) (2025).

== Population ==
Population statistic (10 years)
Year	1995	2005	2015	2025
Count	374	377	387	507
Difference		+0.80%	+2.65%	+31.00%

Population statistic
Year	2024	2025
Count	502	507
Difference		+0.99%

It has a population of 507 people (31 December 2025).

=== Ethnicity ===
Census 2021 (1+ %)
Ethnicity	Number	Fraction
Slovak	432	99.53%
Total	434	

In year 2021 was 434 people by ethnicity 432 as Slovak, 2 as Czech, 2 as Not found out, 1 as Romani, 1 as Austrian, 1 as German and 1 as Other.

Note on population: The difference values of population numbers in the table "Population statistic" and in the sections "Ethnicity" & "Religion" is caused by the use of various statistical methods.

=== Religion ===
Census 2021 (1+ %)
Religion	Number	Fraction
Roman Catholic Church	387	89.17%
None	38	8.76%
Total	434	

In year 2021 was 434 people by religion 387 from Roman Catholic Church, 38 from None, 3 from Apostolic Church, 1 from Other and not ascertained christian church, 1 from Not found out, 1 from Christian Congregations in Slovakia, 1 from Other, 1 from Greek Catholic Church and 1 from Ad hoc movements.

== Genealogical resources ==
The records for genealogical research are available at the state archive "Statny Archiv in Bytca, Slovakia"

- Roman Catholic church records (births/marriages/deaths): 1657-1900 (parish B)

== See also ==
- List of municipalities and towns in Slovakia
