= Podskalie =

- Municipality
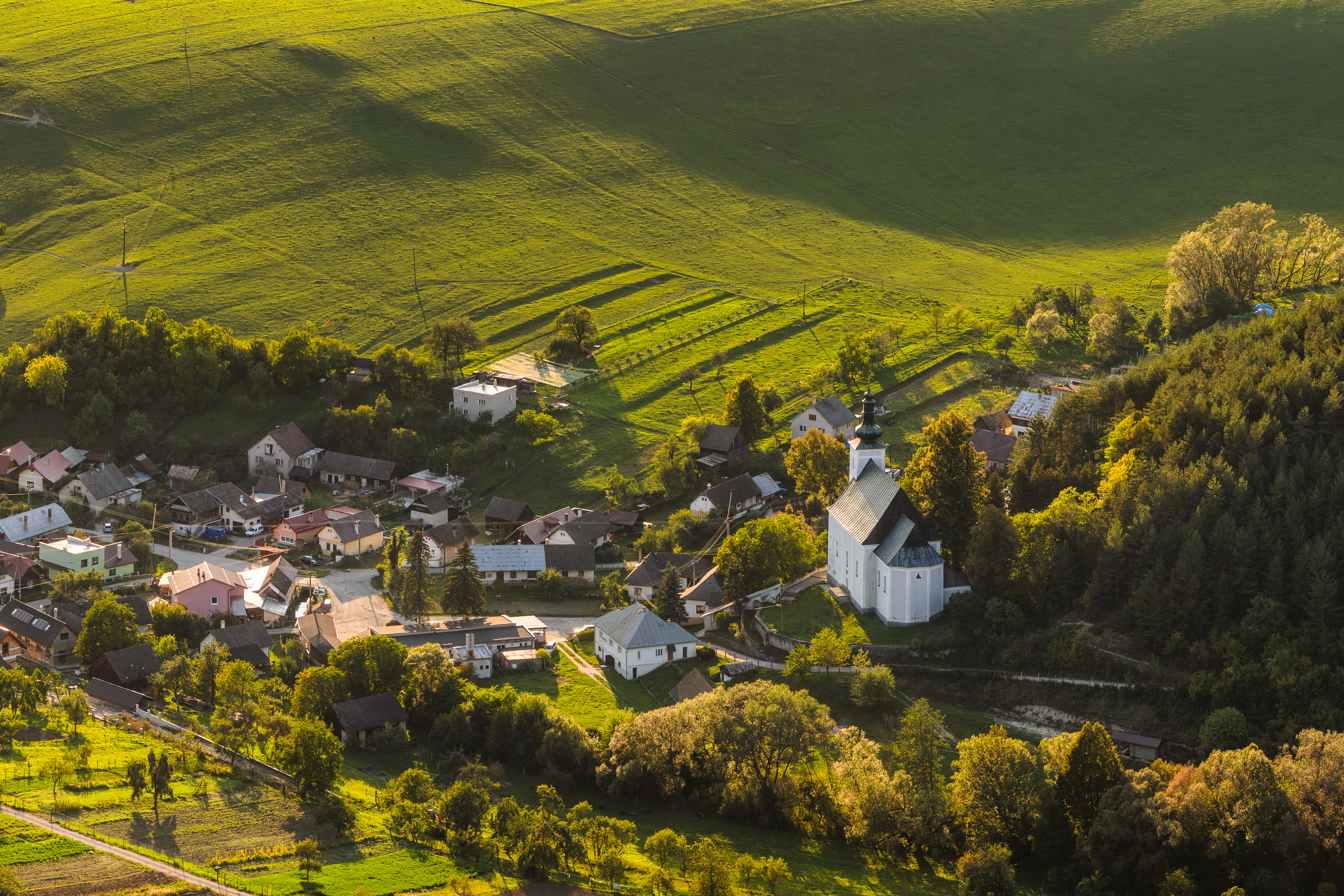

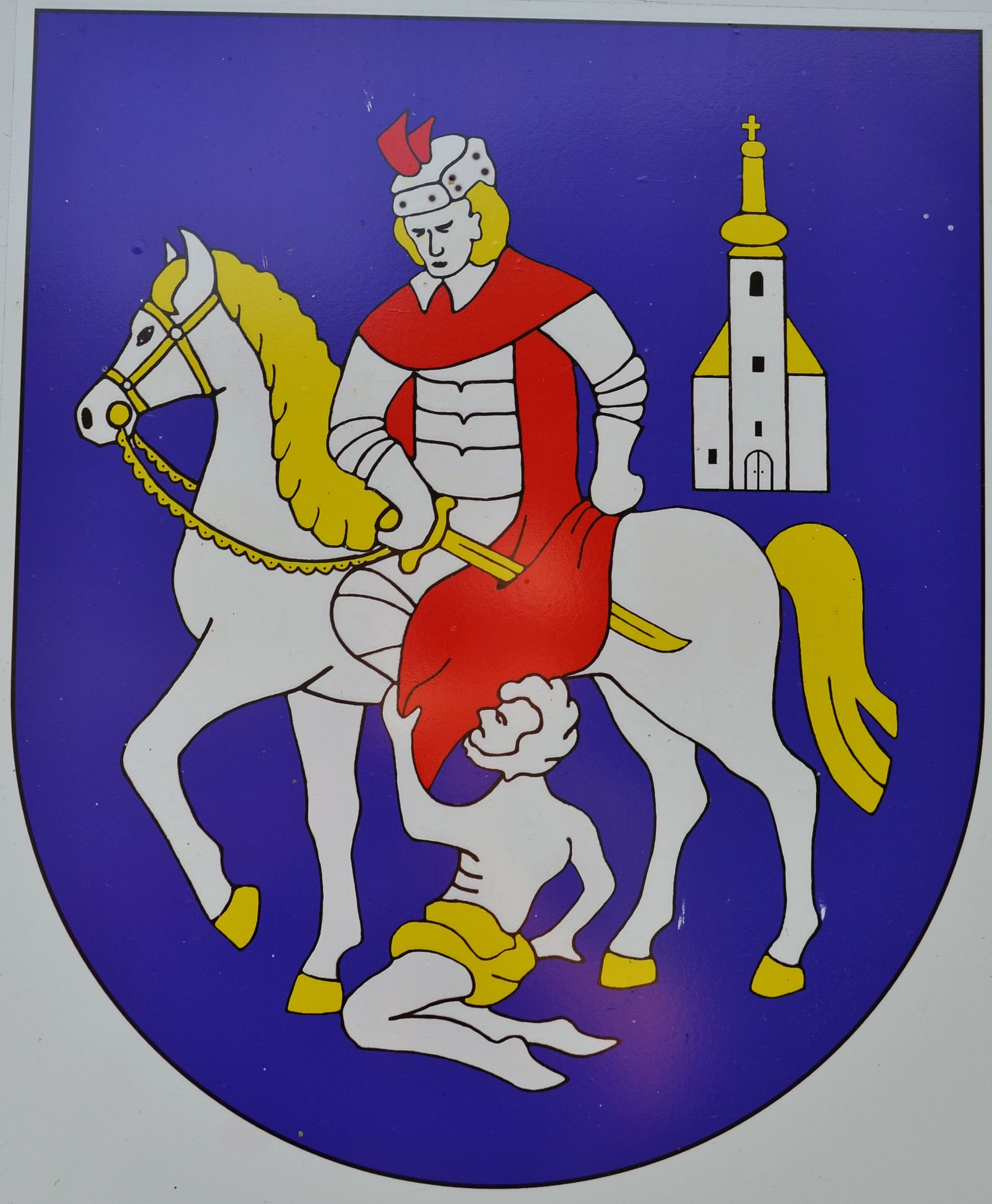
- Flag Coat of arms

- Location of Podskalie in the Trenčín Region Location of Podskalie in Slovakia
- Coordinates: 49.05°N 18.45°E
- Country: Slovakia
- Region: Trenčín Region
- District: Považská Bystrica District
- First mentioned: 1330

Area
  - Total: 7.68 km^{2} (2.97 sq mi)
- Elevation: 360 m (1,180 ft)

Population (2025)
  - Total: 156
- Time zone: UTC+1 (CET)
  - Summer (DST): UTC+2 (CEST)
- Postal code: 182 2
- Area code: +421 42
- Vehicle registration plate (until 2022): PB
- Website: www.obecpodskalie.sk

Podskalie (Hungarian: Egyházasnádas) is a municipality (village) in Slovakia in the Považská Bystrica District. It has 7,68 km^{2} and 145 inhabitants.

== Geography ==
The municipality lies at an altitude of 360 metres (1,180 ft) and covers an area of 7.68 km^{2} (2.97 sq mi) (2025).

== Population ==
Population statistic (10 years)
Year	1995	2005	2015	2025
Count	165	139	123	156
Difference		−15.75%	−11.51%	+26.82%

Population statistic
Year	2024	2025
Count	153	156
Difference		+1.96%

It has a population of 156 people (31 December 2025).

=== Ethnicity ===
Census 2021 (1+ %)
Ethnicity	Number	Fraction
Slovak	124	99.2%
Total	125	

In year 2021 was 125 people by ethnicity 124 as Slovak and 1 as Czech.

Note on population: The difference values of population numbers in the table "Population statistic" and in the sections "Ethnicity" & "Religion" is caused by the use of various statistical methods.

=== Religion ===
Census 2021 (1+ %)
Religion	Number	Fraction
Roman Catholic Church	116	92.8%
None	8	6.4%
Total	125	

In year 2021 was 125 people by religion 116 from Roman Catholic Church, 8 from None and 1 from Evangelical Church.
