= Dolný Lieskov =

- Municipality
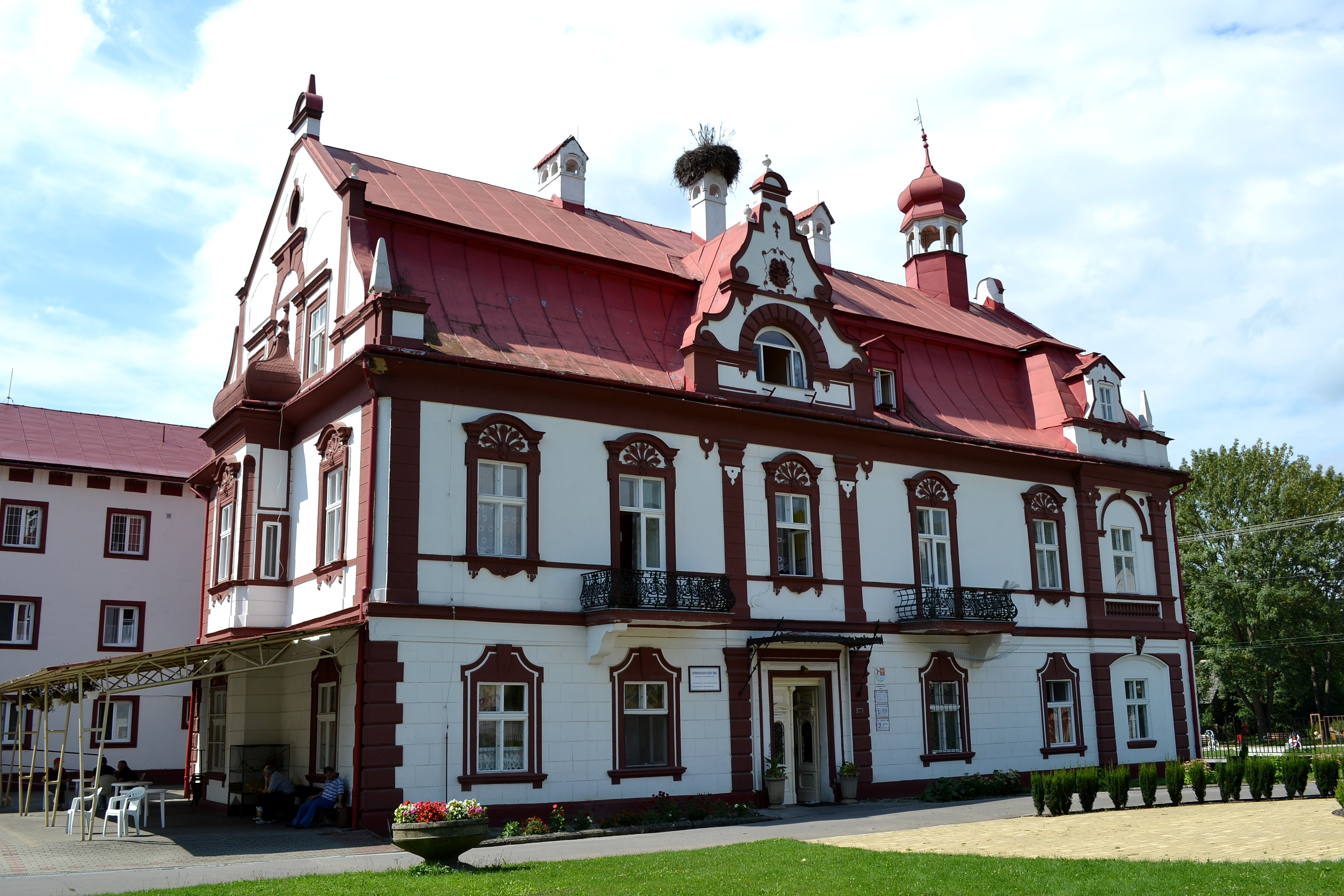

- Flag

- Location of Dolný Lieskov in the Trenčín Region Location of Dolný Lieskov in Slovakia
- Coordinates: 49.05°N 18.42°E
- Country: Slovakia
- Region: Trenčín Region
- District: Považská Bystrica District
- First mentioned: 1327

Area
  - Total: 16.47 km^{2} (6.36 sq mi)
- Elevation: 318 m (1,043 ft)

Population (2025)
  - Total: 786
- Time zone: UTC+1 (CET)
  - Summer (DST): UTC+2 (CEST)
- Postal code: 182 1
- Area code: +421 42
- Vehicle registration plate (until 2022): PB
- Website: www.dolnylieskov.sk

Dolný Lieskov (Slovak pronunciation: [ˈdɔlniː ˈlɪeskɔw]; Hungarian: Alsómogyoród) is a village and municipality in Považská Bystrica District in the Trenčín Region of north-western Slovakia.

== History ==
In historical records the village was first mentioned in 1327.

== Geography ==
The municipality lies at an altitude of 318 metres (1,043 ft) and covers an area of 16.47 km^{2} (6.36 sq mi) (2025).

== Population ==
Population statistic (10 years)
| Year | 1995 | 2005 | 2015 | 2025 |
|---|---|---|---|---|
| Count | 718 | 813 | 806 | 786 |
| Difference | | +13.23% | −0.86% | −2.48% |

Population statistic
| Year | 2024 | 2025 |
|---|---|---|
| Count | 793 | 786 |
| Difference | | −0.88% |

It has a population of 786 people (31 December 2025).

=== Ethnicity ===
Census 2021 (1+ %)
| Ethnicity | Number | Fraction |
|---|---|---|
| Slovak | 802 | 97.8% |
| Czech | 9 | 1.09% |
| Not found out | 9 | 1.09% |
| Total | 820 | |

In year 2021 was 820 people by ethnicity 802 as Slovak, 9 as Czech, 9 as Not found out, 6 as Other, 2 as Hungarian, 2 as English and 1 as Romani.

Note on population: The difference values of population numbers in the table "Population statistic" and in the sections "Ethnicity" & "Religion" is caused by the use of various statistical methods.

=== Religion ===
Census 2021 (1+ %)
| Religion | Number | Fraction |
|---|---|---|
| Roman Catholic Church | 703 | 85.73% |
| None | 78 | 9.51% |
| Not found out | 11 | 1.34% |
| Total | 820 | |

In year 2021 was 820 people by religion 703 from Roman Catholic Church, 78 from None, 11 from Not found out, 7 from Other, 5 from Christian Congregations in Slovakia, 5 from Seventh-day Adventist Church, 4 from Calvinist Church, 4 from Ad hoc movements, 1 from Other and not ascertained christian church, 1 from Greek Catholic Church and 1 from Evangelical Church.

== Genealogical resources ==
The records for genealogical research are available at the state archive "Statny Archiv in Bytca, Slovakia"

- Roman Catholic church records (births/marriages/deaths): 1657-1900 (parish B)

== See also ==
- List of municipalities and towns in Slovakia
