= Dolná Mariková =

- Municipality
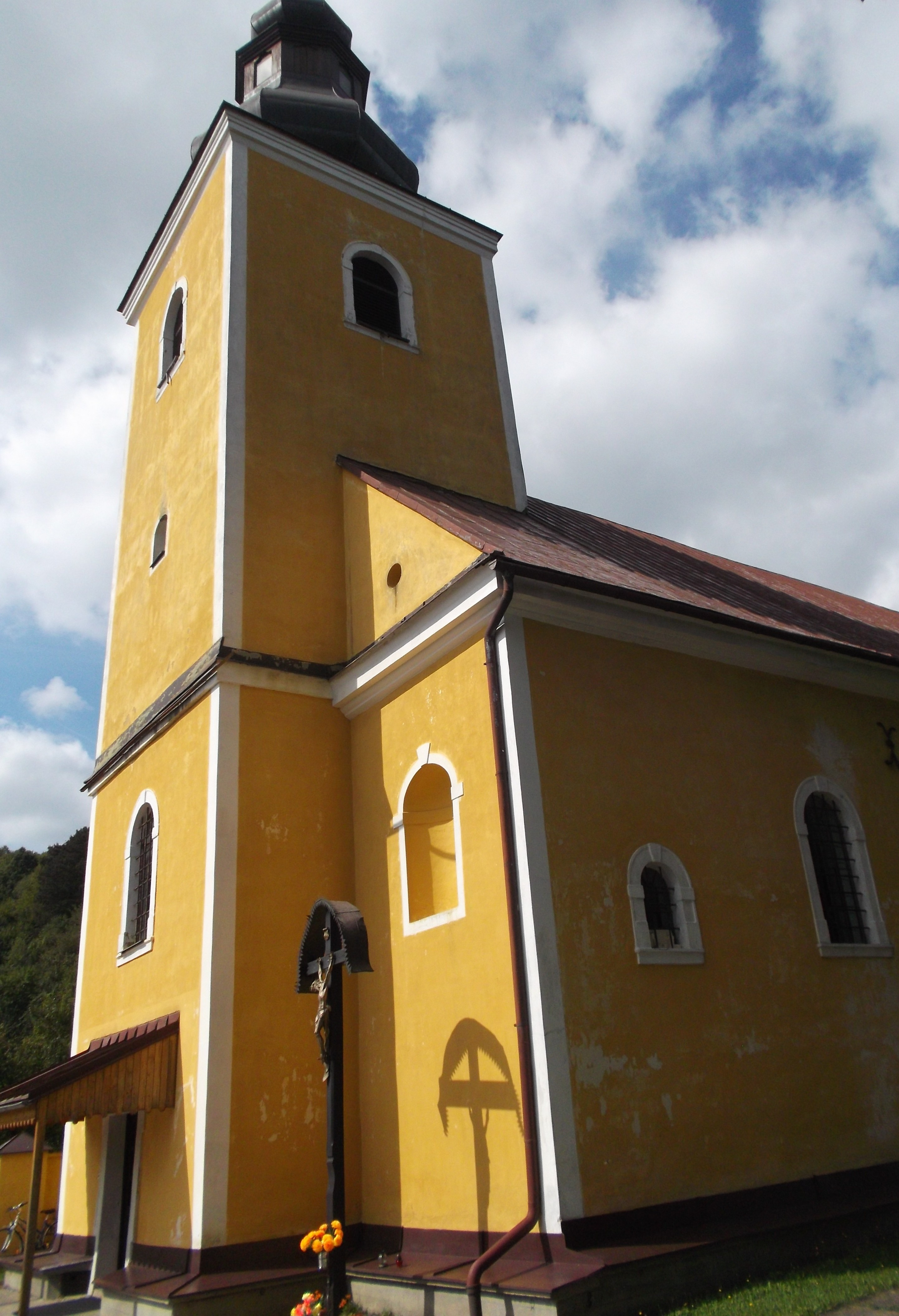
- Saints Peter and Paul Church

- Flag

- Location of Dolná Mariková in the Trenčín Region Location of Dolná Mariková in Slovakia
- Coordinates: 49.25°N 18.37°E
- Country: Slovakia
- Region: Trenčín Region
- District: Považská Bystrica District
- First mentioned: 1321

Area
  - Total: 22.12 km^{2} (8.54 sq mi)
- Elevation: 427 m (1,401 ft)

Population (2025)
  - Total: 1,406
- Time zone: UTC+1 (CET)
  - Summer (DST): UTC+2 (CEST)
- Postal code: 180 2
- Area code: +421 42
- Vehicle registration plate (until 2022): PB
- Website: www.dolnamarikova.sk

Dolná Mariková (Hungarian: Alsómarikó) is a village and municipality in Považská Bystrica District in the Trenčín Region of north-western Slovakia.

== History ==
In historical records the village was first mentioned in 1321.

== Geography ==
The municipality lies at an altitude of 427 metres (1,401 ft) and covers an area of 22.12 km^{2} (8.54 sq mi) (2025).

== Population ==
Population statistic (10 years)
Year	1995	2005	2015	2025
Count	1544	1446	1415	1406
Difference		−6.34%	−2.14%	−0.63%

Population statistic
Year	2024	2025
Count	1406	1406
Difference		+0%

It has a population of 1406 people (31 December 2025).

=== Ethnicity ===
Census 2021 (1+ %)
Ethnicity	Number	Fraction
Slovak	1381	97.8%
Not found out	29	2.05%
Total	1412	

In year 2021 was 1412 people by ethnicity 1381 as Slovak, 29 as Not found out, 10 as Czech, 2 as Romani, 2 as Other, 1 as Russian, 1 as Polish, 1 as Hungarian and 1 as Bulgarian.

Note on population: The difference values of population numbers in the table "Population statistic" and in the sections "Ethnicity" & "Religion" is caused by the use of various statistical methods.

=== Religion ===
Census 2021 (1+ %)
Religion	Number	Fraction
Roman Catholic Church	1142	80.88%
None	200	14.16%
Not found out	29	2.05%
Total	1412	

In year 2021 was 1412 people by religion 1142 from Roman Catholic Church, 200 from None, 29 from Not found out, 12 from Christian Congregations in Slovakia, 7 from Evangelical Church, 6 from Ad hoc movements, 4 from Greek Catholic Church, 3 from Paganism and natural spirituality, 3 from Other, 2 from Other and not ascertained christian church, 1 from Old Catholic Church, 1 from Calvinist Church, 1 from Jehovah's Witnesses and 1 from Islam.

== Genealogical resources ==
The records for genealogical research are available at the state archive "Statny Archiv in Bytca, Slovakia"

- Roman Catholic church records (births/marriages/deaths): 1711-1895 (parish A)

== See also ==
- List of municipalities and towns in Slovakia
