= Záskalie =

- Municipality
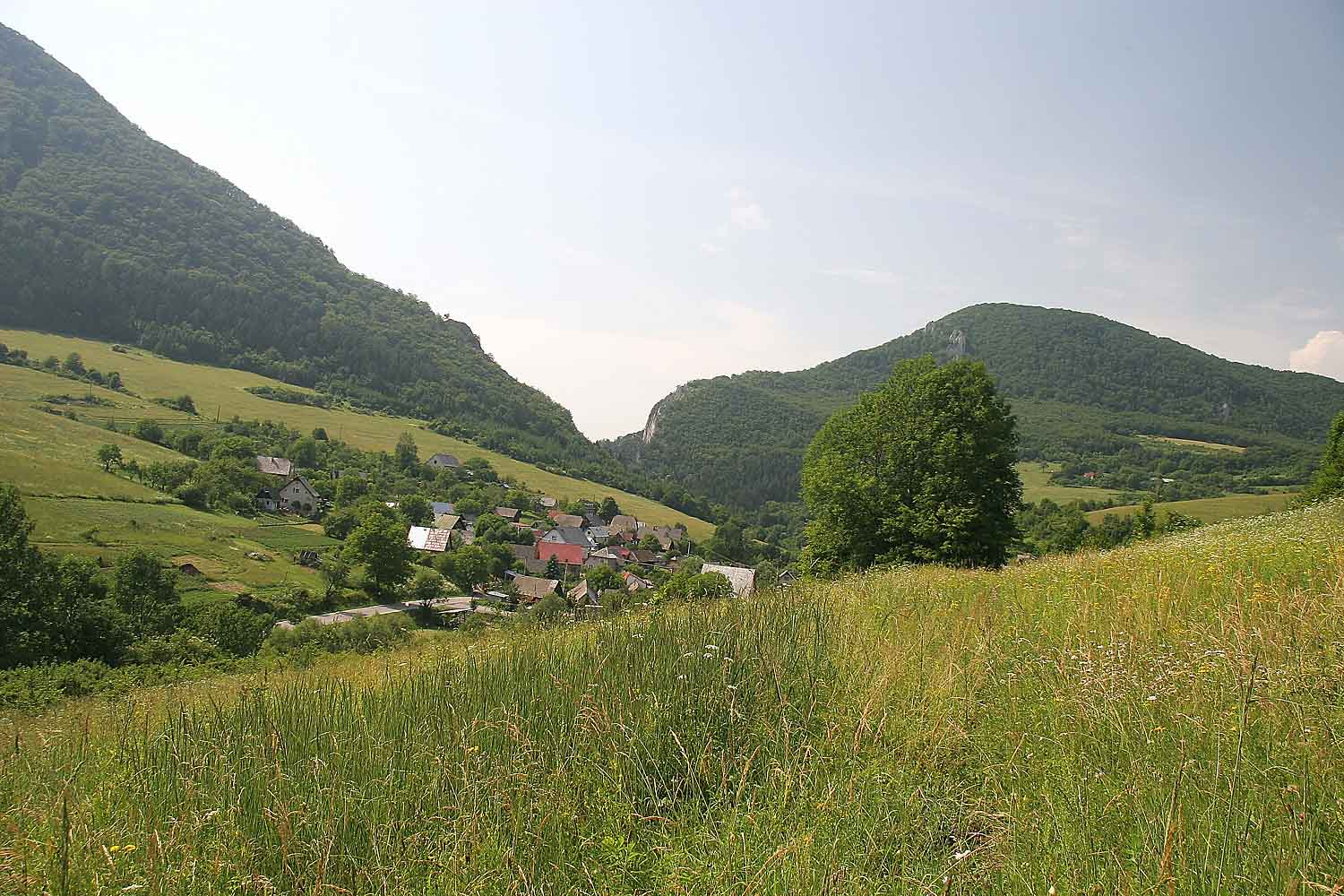

- Flag

- Location of Záskalie in the Trenčín Region Location of Záskalie in Slovakia
- Coordinates: 49.14°N 18.52°E
- Country: Slovakia
- Region: Trenčín Region
- District: Považská Bystrica District
- First mentioned: 1379

Area
  - Total: 2.38 km^{2} (0.92 sq mi)
- Elevation: 397 m (1,302 ft)

Population (2025)
  - Total: 229
- Time zone: UTC+1 (CET)
  - Summer (DST): UTC+2 (CEST)
- Postal code: 170 5
- Area code: +421 42
- Vehicle registration plate (until 2022): PB
- Website: zaskalie.webnode.sk

Záskalie (Hungarian: Sziklahát) is a village and municipality in Považská Bystrica District in the Trenčín Region of north-western Slovakia.

== History ==
In historical records the village was first mentioned in 1379.

== Geography ==
The municipality lies at an altitude of 397 metres (1,302 ft) and covers an area of 2.38 km^{2} (0.92 sq mi) (2025).

== Population ==
Population statistic (10 years)
| Year | 1995 | 2005 | 2015 | 2025 |
|---|---|---|---|---|
| Count | 194 | 183 | 177 | 229 |
| Difference | | −5.67% | −3.27% | +29.37% |

Population statistic
| Year | 2024 | 2025 |
|---|---|---|
| Count | 223 | 229 |
| Difference | | +2.69% |

It has a population of 229 people (31 December 2025).

=== Ethnicity ===
Census 2021 (1+ %)
| Ethnicity | Number | Fraction |
|---|---|---|
| Slovak | 188 | 96.9% |
| Not found out | 4 | 2.06% |
| Czech | 3 | 1.54% |
| Total | 194 | |

In year 2021 was 194 people by ethnicity 188 as Slovak, 4 as Not found out, 3 as Czech, 1 as German and 1 as Hungarian.

Note on population: The difference values of population numbers in the table "Population statistic" and in the sections "Ethnicity" & "Religion" is caused by the use of various statistical methods.

=== Religion ===
Census 2021 (1+ %)
| Religion | Number | Fraction |
|---|---|---|
| Roman Catholic Church | 174 | 89.69% |
| None | 15 | 7.73% |
| Not found out | 4 | 2.06% |
| Total | 194 | |

In year 2021 was 194 people by religion 174 from Roman Catholic Church, 15 from None, 4 from Not found out and 1 from Buddhism.
