= Dolný Moštenec =

Coordinates: 49.08790°N 18.44353°E

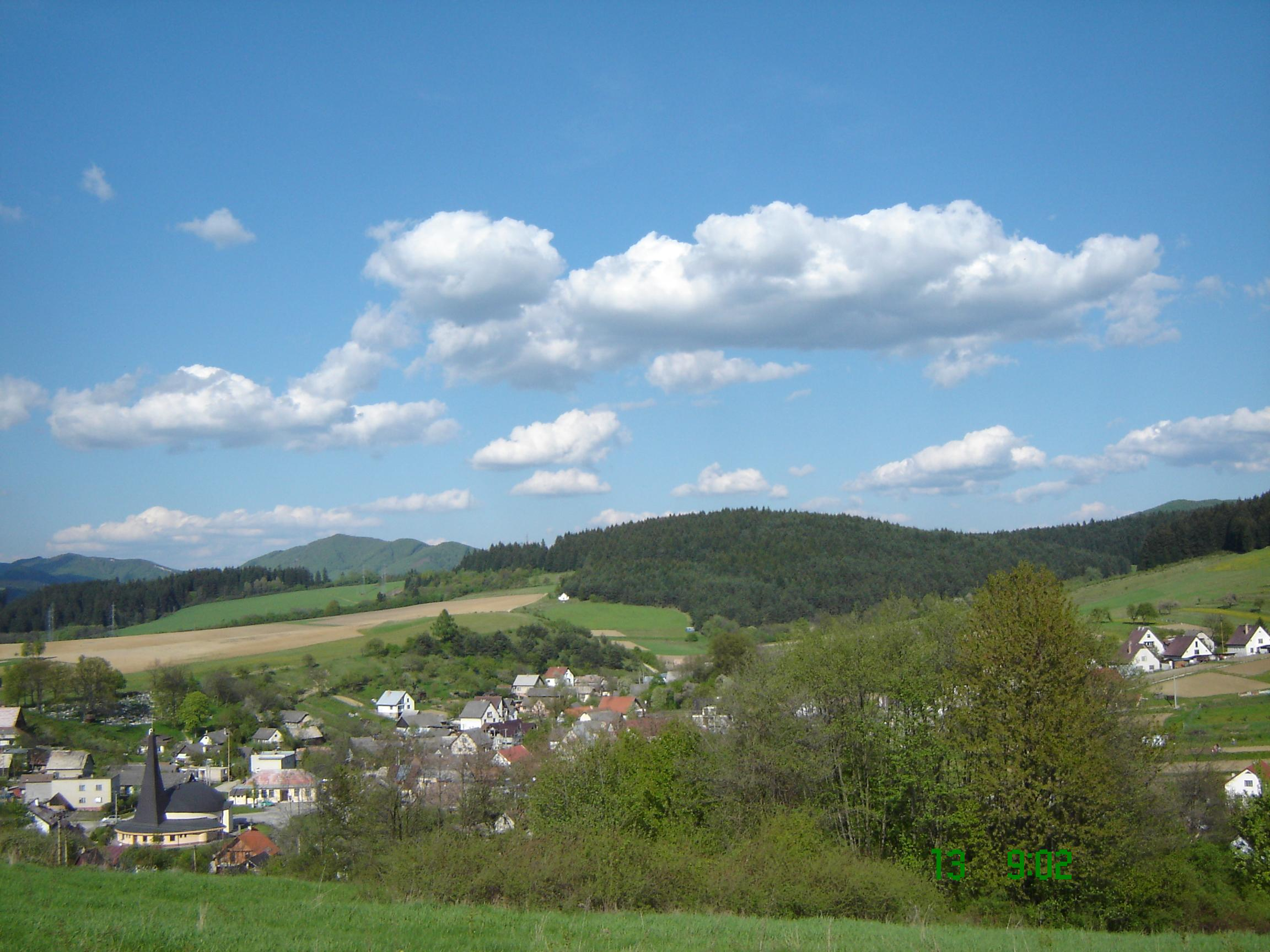
View on Dolný Moštenec

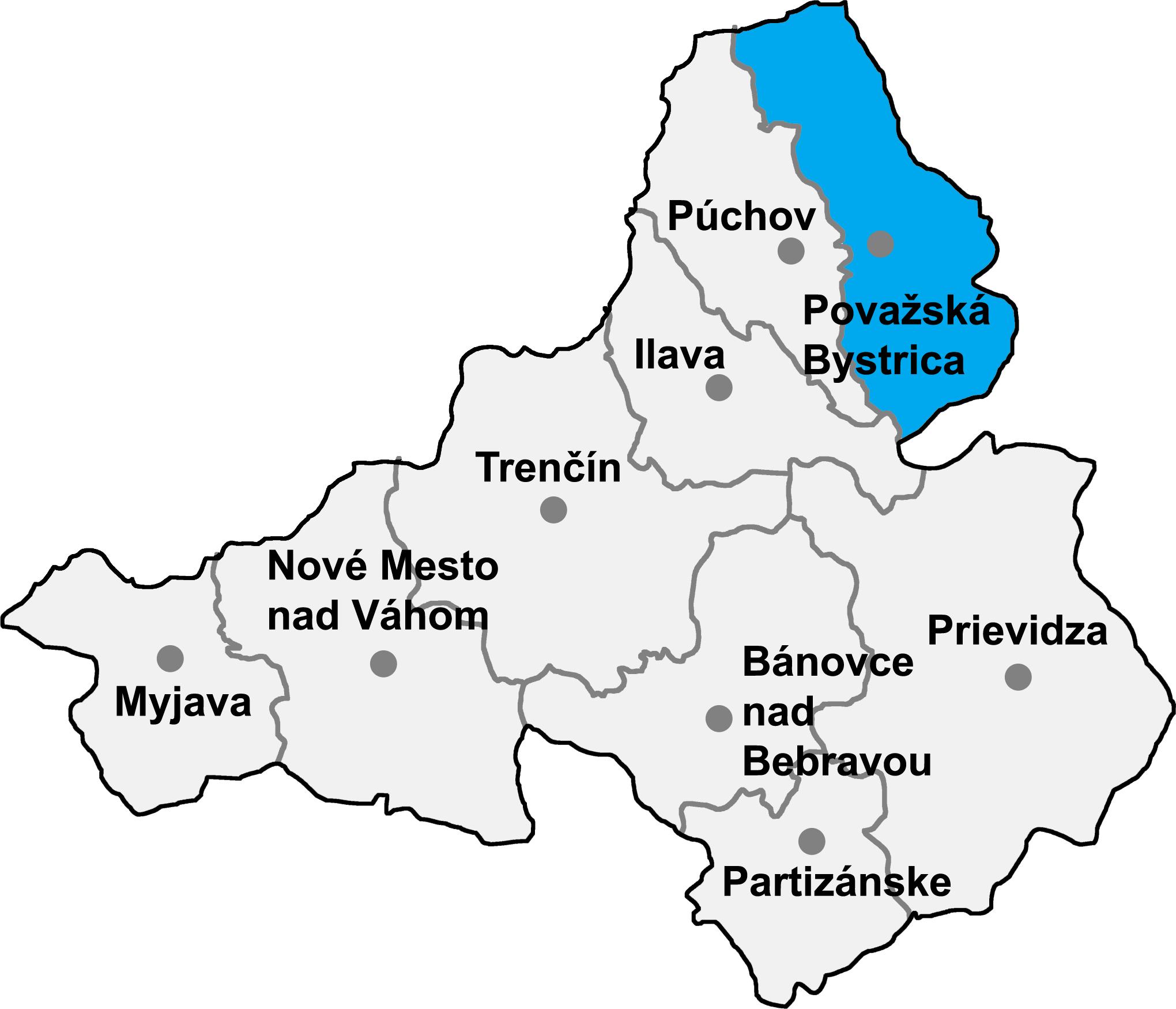
Location of Považská Bystrica District in the Trenčín Region

Dolný Moštenec is a town section of Považská Bystrica District in the Trenčín Region of north-western Slovakia.

== History ==
In historical records the village was first mentioned in 1397.

== Geography ==
The municipality lies at an altitude of 344 meters and covers an area of 5.74 km^{2}. It has a population of about 741 people.
