= Ďurďové =

- Municipality
- Flag

- Location of Ďurďové in the Trenčín Region Location of Ďurďové in Slovakia
- Coordinates: 49.03°N 18.50°E
- Country: Slovakia
- Region: Trenčín Region
- District: Považská Bystrica District
- First mentioned: 1393

Area
  - Total: 4.81 km^{2} (1.86 sq mi)
- Elevation: 447 m (1,467 ft)

Population (2025)
  - Total: 172
- Time zone: UTC+1 (CET)
  - Summer (DST): UTC+2 (CEST)
- Postal code: 182 2
- Area code: +421 42
- Vehicle registration plate (until 2022): PB
- Website: durdove.eu

Ďurďové (Hungarian: Gergőfalva) is a village and municipality in Považská Bystrica District in the Trenčín Region of north-western Slovakia.

== History ==
In historical records the village was first mentioned in 1393.

== Geography ==
The municipality lies at an altitude of 447 metres (1,467 ft) and covers an area of 4.81 km^{2} (1.86 sq mi) (2025).

== Population ==
Population statistic (10 years)
Year	1995	2005	2015	2025
Count	182	189	149	172
Difference		+3.84%	−21.16%	+15.43%

Population statistic
Year	2024	2025
Count	165	172
Difference		+4.24%

It has a population of 172 people (31 December 2025).

=== Ethnicity ===
Census 2021 (1+ %)
Ethnicity	Number	Fraction
Slovak	141	99.29%
Total	142	

In year 2021 was 142 people by ethnicity 141 as Slovak, 1 as Czech and 1 as Polish.

Note on population: The difference values of population numbers in the table "Population statistic" and in the sections "Ethnicity" & "Religion" is caused by the use of various statistical methods.

=== Religion ===
Census 2021 (1+ %)
Religion	Number	Fraction
Roman Catholic Church	132	92.96%
None	8	5.63%
Total	142	

In year 2021 was 142 people by religion 132 from Roman Catholic Church, 8 from None, 1 from Evangelical Church and 1 from Church of Jesus Christ of Latter-day Saints.

== Genealogical resources ==
The records for genealogical research are available at the state archive "Statny Archiv in Bytca, Slovakia"

- Roman Catholic church records (births/marriages/deaths): 1788-1948 (parish B)

== See also ==
- List of municipalities and towns in Slovakia
