= Slopná =

- Municipality
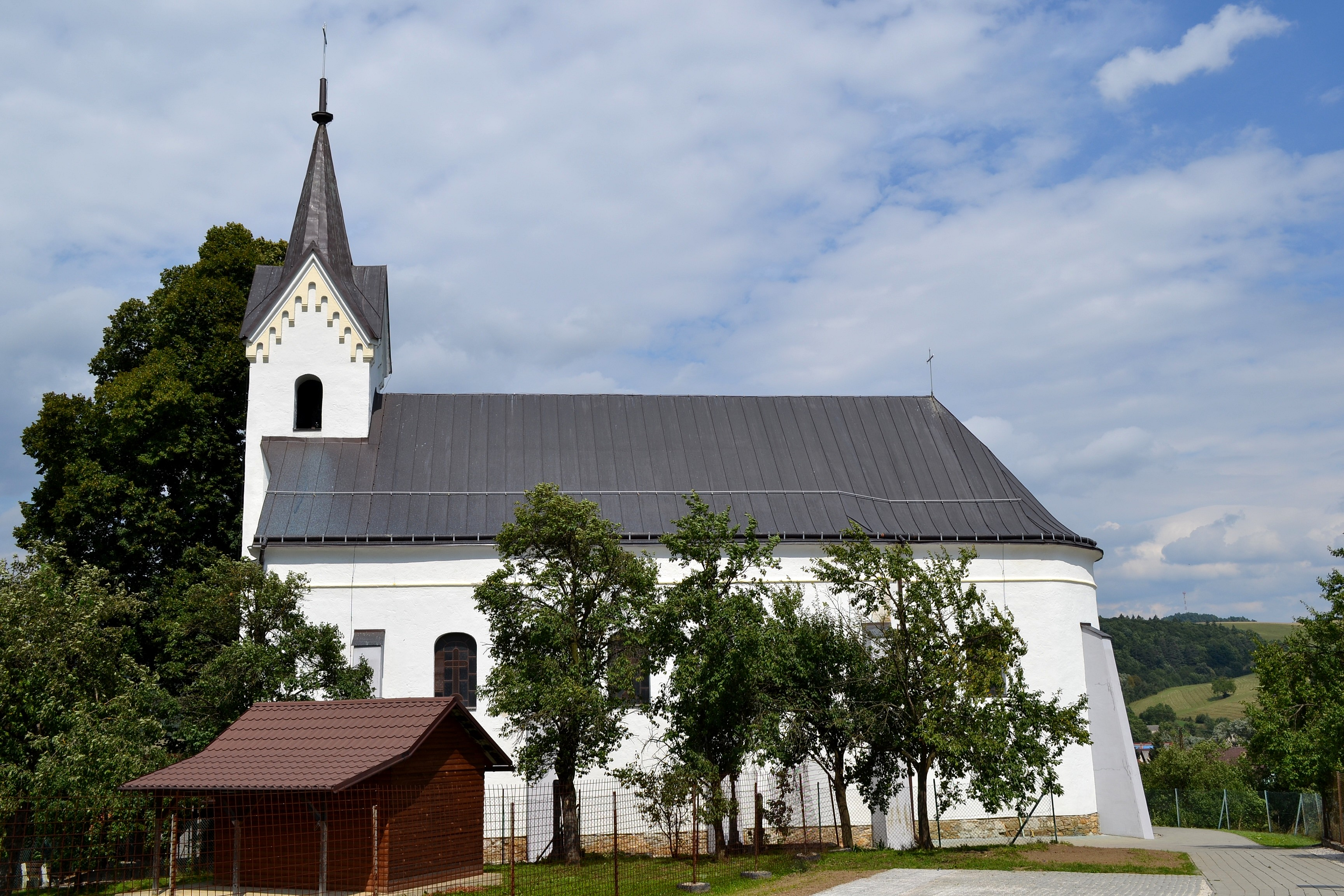
- St. Andrew's Church

- Flag

- Location of Slopná in the Trenčín Region Location of Slopná in Slovakia
- Coordinates: 49.05°N 18.40°E
- Country: Slovakia
- Region: Trenčín Region
- District: Považská Bystrica District
- First mentioned: 1277

Area
  - Total: 7.64 km^{2} (2.95 sq mi)
- Elevation: 309 m (1,014 ft)

Population (2025)
  - Total: 494
- Time zone: UTC+1 (CET)
  - Summer (DST): UTC+2 (CEST)
- Postal code: 182 1
- Area code: +421 42
- Vehicle registration plate (until 2022): PB
- Website: www.slopna.sk

Slopná (Hungarian: Szolopna) is a village and municipality in Považská Bystrica District in the Trenčín Region of north-western Slovakia.

== History ==
In historical records the village was first mentioned in 1277.

== Geography ==
The municipality lies at an altitude of 309 metres (1,014 ft) and covers an area of 7.64 km^{2} (2.95 sq mi) (2025).

== Population ==
Population statistic (10 years)
Year	1995	2005	2015	2025
Count	505	480	492	494
Difference		−4.95%	+2.5%	+0.40%

Population statistic
Year	2024	2025
Count	496	494
Difference		−0.40%

It has a population of 494 people (31 December 2025).

=== Ethnicity ===
Census 2021 (1+ %)
Ethnicity	Number	Fraction
Slovak	479	98.96%
Total	484	

In year 2021 was 484 people by ethnicity 479 as Slovak, 3 as Czech, 3 as Not found out, 1 as Italian, 1 as Romani and 1 as Other.

Note on population: The difference values of population numbers in the table "Population statistic" and in the sections "Ethnicity" & "Religion" is caused by the use of various statistical methods.

=== Religion ===
Census 2021 (1+ %)
Religion	Number	Fraction
Roman Catholic Church	457	94.42%
None	14	2.89%
Total	484	

In year 2021 was 484 people by religion 457 from Roman Catholic Church, 14 from None, 4 from Other, 3 from Not found out, 2 from Christian Congregations in Slovakia, 2 from Evangelical Church and 2 from Ad hoc movements.
