= Brvnište =

- Municipality
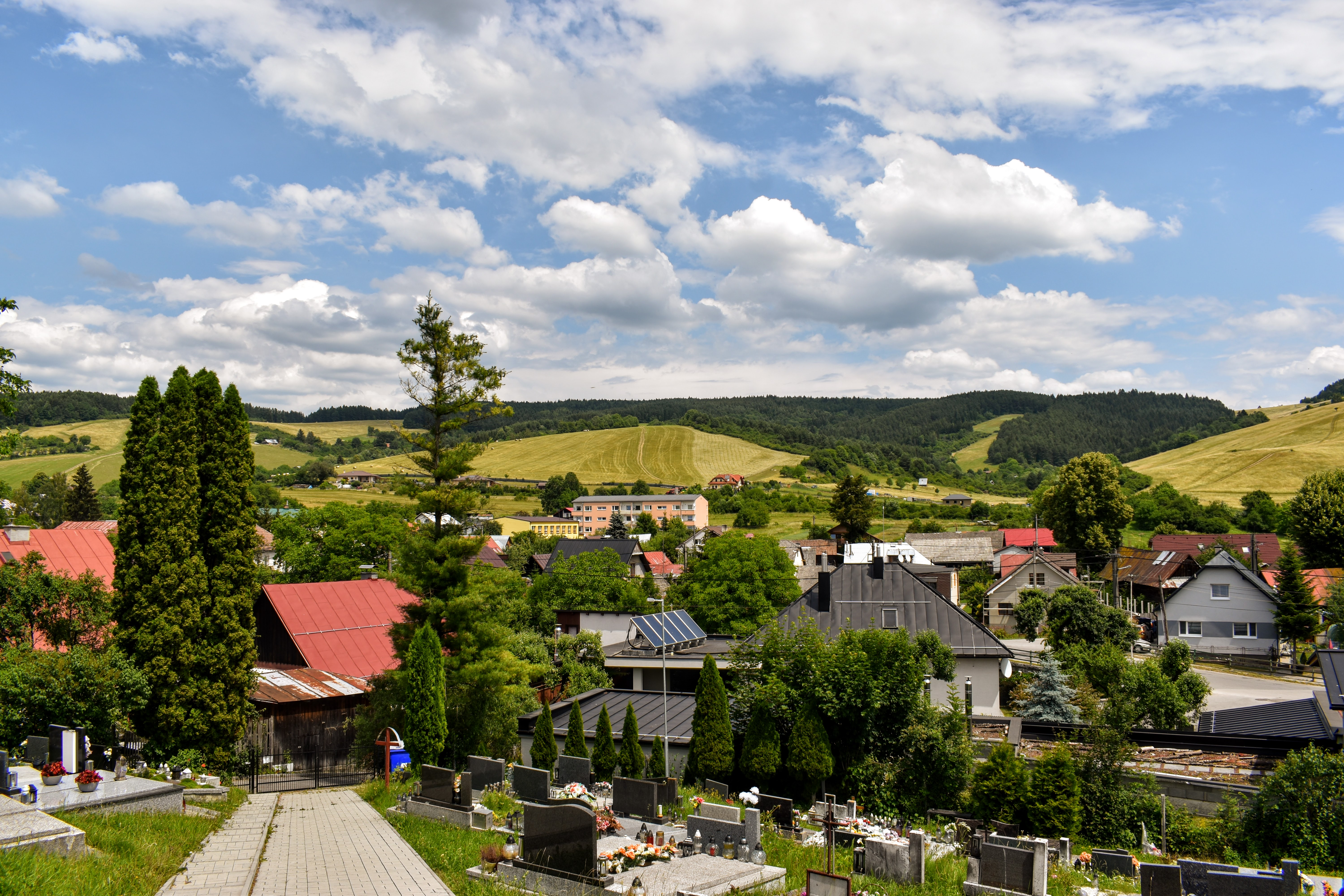

- Flag

- Location of Brvnište in the Trenčín Region Location of Brvnište in Slovakia
- Coordinates: 49.22°N 18.43°E
- Country: Slovakia
- Region: Trenčín Region
- District: Považská Bystrica District
- First mentioned: 1598

Area
  - Total: 6.93 km^{2} (2.68 sq mi)
- Elevation: 360 m (1,180 ft)

Population (2025)
  - Total: 1,147
- Time zone: UTC+1 (CET)
  - Summer (DST): UTC+2 (CEST)
- Postal code: 181 2
- Area code: +421 42
- Vehicle registration plate (until 2022): PB

Brvnište (Hungarian: Boronás) is a village and municipality in Považská Bystrica District in the Trenčín Region of north-western Slovakia.

== History ==
In historical records the village was first mentioned in 1598.

== Geography ==
The municipality lies at an altitude of 360 metres (1,180 ft) and covers an area of 6.93 km^{2} (2.68 sq mi) (2025).

== Population ==
Population statistic (10 years)
Year	1995	2005	2015	2025
Count	1134	1162	1189	1147
Difference		+2.46%	+2.32%	−3.53%

Population statistic
Year	2024	2025
Count	1167	1147
Difference		−1.71%

It has a population of 1147 people (31 December 2025).

=== Ethnicity ===
Census 2021 (1+ %)
Ethnicity	Number	Fraction
Slovak	1158	95.38%
Not found out	56	4.61%
Total	1214	

In year 2021 was 1214 people by ethnicity 1158 as Slovak, 56 as Not found out, 6 as Czech, 2 as English and 1 as Moravian.

Note on population: The difference values of population numbers in the table "Population statistic" and in the sections "Ethnicity" & "Religion" is caused by the use of various statistical methods.

=== Religion ===
Census 2021 (1+ %)
Religion	Number	Fraction
Roman Catholic Church	949	78.17%
None	173	14.25%
Not found out	54	4.45%
Total	1214	

In year 2021 was 1214 people by religion 949 from Roman Catholic Church, 173 from None, 54 from Not found out, 10 from Christian Congregations in Slovakia, 7 from Greek Catholic Church, 7 from Evangelical Church, 4 from Ad hoc movements, 3 from Other, 2 from Calvinist Church, 2 from Paganism and natural spirituality, 2 from Jehovah's Witnesses and 1 from Buddhism.

== Genealogical resources ==
The records for genealogical research are available at the state archive "Statny Archiv in Bytca, Slovakia"

- Roman Catholic church records (births/marriages/deaths): 1714-1901 (parish B)

== See also ==
- List of municipalities and towns in Slovakia
