= Vrchteplá =

- Municipality
- Flag

- Location of Vrchteplá in the Trenčín Region Location of Vrchteplá in Slovakia
- Coordinates: 49.13°N 18.57°E
- Country: Slovakia
- Region: Trenčín Region
- District: Považská Bystrica District
- First mentioned: 1430

Area
  - Total: 4.89 km^{2} (1.89 sq mi)
- Elevation: 522 m (1,713 ft)

Population (2025)
  - Total: 251
- Time zone: UTC+1 (CET)
  - Summer (DST): UTC+2 (CEST)
- Postal code: 170 5
- Area code: +421 42
- Vehicle registration plate (until 2022): PB
- Website: www.vrchtepla.sk

Vrchteplá (Hungarian: Felsőhéve) is a village and municipality in Považská Bystrica District in the Trenčín Region of north-western Slovakia.

== History ==
In historical records the village was first mentioned in 1430.

== Geography ==
The municipality lies at an altitude of 522 metres (1,713 ft) and covers an area of 4.89 km^{2} (1.89 sq mi) (2025).

== Population ==
Population statistic (10 years)
Year	1995	2005	2015	2025
Count	258	260	274	251
Difference		+0.77%	+5.38%	−8.39%

Population statistic
Year	2024	2025
Count	248	251
Difference		+1.20%

It has a population of 251 people (31 December 2025).

=== Ethnicity ===
Census 2021 (1+ %)
Ethnicity	Number	Fraction
Slovak	233	93.95%
Not found out	13	5.24%
Total	248	

In year 2021 was 248 people by ethnicity 233 as Slovak, 13 as Not found out, 2 as German and 1 as English.

Note on population: The difference values of population numbers in the table "Population statistic" and in the sections "Ethnicity" & "Religion" is caused by the use of various statistical methods.

=== Religion ===
Census 2021 (1+ %)
Religion	Number	Fraction
Evangelical Church	132	53.23%
Roman Catholic Church	55	22.18%
None	47	18.95%
Not found out	13	5.24%
Total	248	

In year 2021 was 248 people by religion 132 from Evangelical Church, 55 from Roman Catholic Church, 47 from None, 13 from Not found out and 1 from Eastern Orthodox Church.
