= Udiča =

- Municipality
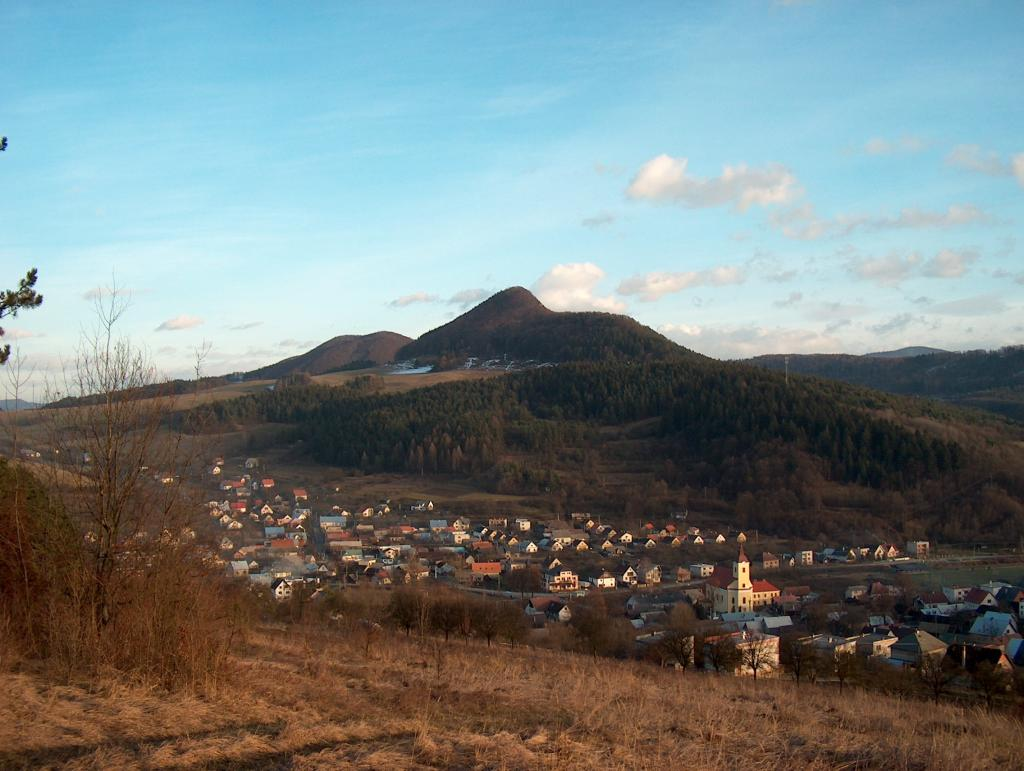

- Flag

- Location of Udiča in the Trenčín Region Location of Udiča in Slovakia
- Coordinates: 49.17°N 18.40°E
- Country: Slovakia
- Region: Trenčín Region
- District: Považská Bystrica District
- First mentioned: 1321

Area
  - Total: 22.14 km^{2} (8.55 sq mi)
- Elevation: 306 m (1,004 ft)

Population (2025)
  - Total: 2,237
- Time zone: UTC+1 (CET)
  - Summer (DST): UTC+2 (CEST)
- Postal code: 180 1
- Area code: +421 42
- Vehicle registration plate (until 2022): PB
- Website: www.obecudica.sk

Udiča (Hungarian: Váguda) is a village and municipality in Považská Bystrica District in the Trenčín Region of north-western Slovakia.

== History ==
In historical records the village was first mentioned in 1321.

== Geography ==
The municipality lies at an altitude of 306 metres (1,004 ft) and covers an area of 22.14 km^{2} (8.55 sq mi) (2025).

== Population ==
Population statistic (10 years)
Year	1995	2005	2015	2025
Count	2173	2217	2207	2237
Difference		+2.02%	−0.45%	+1.35%

Population statistic
Year	2024	2025
Count	2249	2237
Difference		−0.53%

It has a population of 2237 people (31 December 2025).

=== Ethnicity ===
Census 2021 (1+ %)
Ethnicity	Number	Fraction
Slovak	2116	94.17%
Not found out	128	5.69%
Total	2247	

In year 2021 was 2247 people by ethnicity 2116 as Slovak, 128 as Not found out, 10 as Czech, 3 as Polish, 3 as Hungarian, 2 as Romani, 2 as Other, 1 as Irish, 1 as Rusyn and 1 as Russian.

Note on population: The difference values of population numbers in the table "Population statistic" and in the sections "Ethnicity" & "Religion" is caused by the use of various statistical methods.

=== Religion ===
Census 2021 (1+ %)
Religion	Number	Fraction
Roman Catholic Church	1817	80.86%
None	237	10.55%
Not found out	125	5.56%
Evangelical Church	24	1.07%
Total	2247	

In year 2021 was 2247 people by religion 1817 from Roman Catholic Church, 237 from None, 125 from Not found out, 24 from Evangelical Church, 8 from Christian Congregations in Slovakia, 8 from Other, 7 from Greek Catholic Church, 6 from Ad hoc movements, 3 from Seventh-day Adventist Church, 2 from Calvinist Church, 2 from Other and not ascertained christian church, 2 from Buddhism, 1 from Jewish community, 1 from Eastern Orthodox Church, 1 from Paganism and natural spirituality, 1 from Islam, 1 from Hinduism and 1 from Apostolic Church.
