= Kostolec =

- Municipality
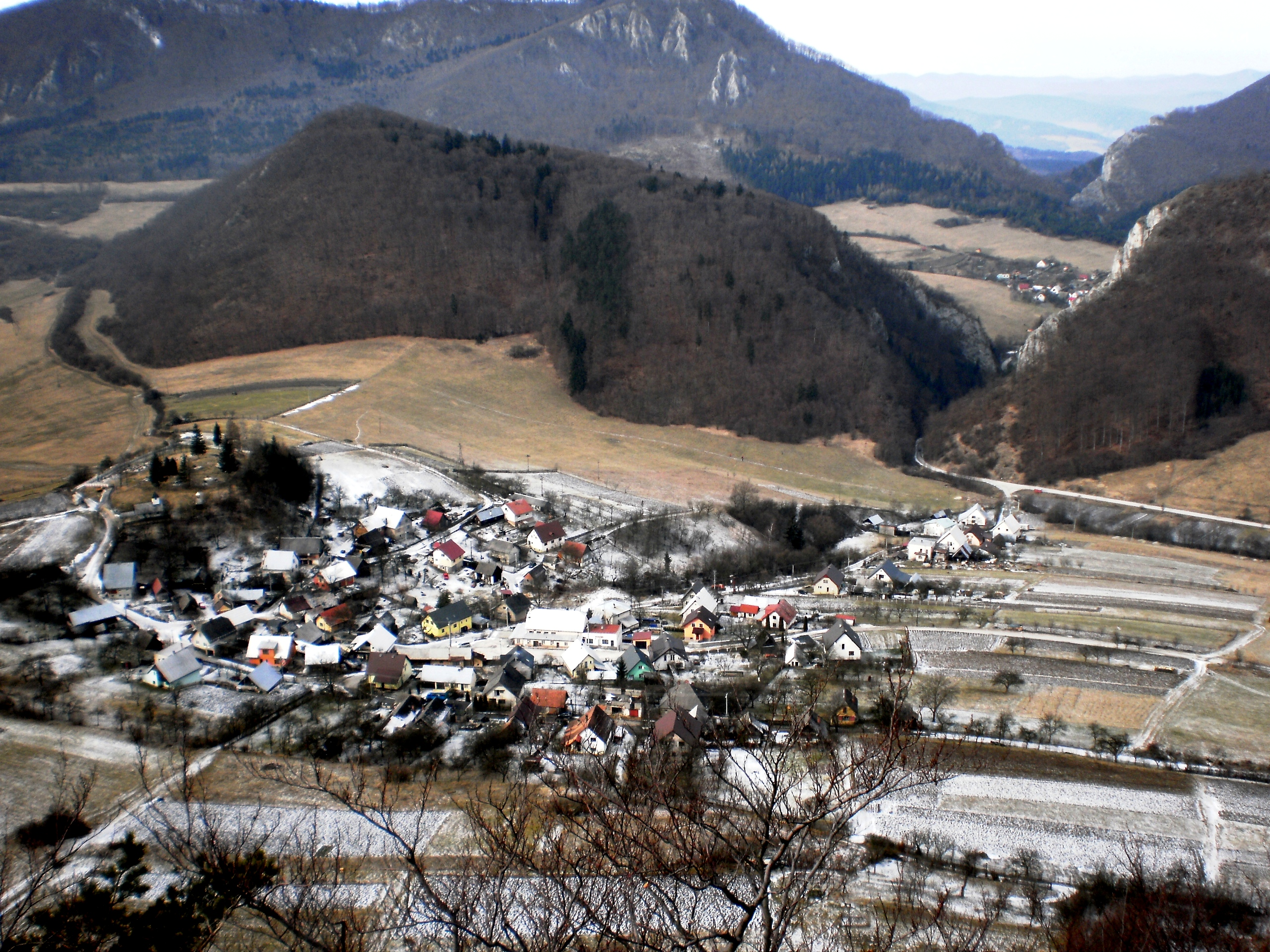

- Flag

- Location of Kostolec in the Trenčín Region Location of Kostolec in Slovakia
- Coordinates: 49.13°N 18.53°E
- Country: Slovakia
- Region: Trenčín Region
- District: Považská Bystrica District
- First mentioned: 1430

Area
  - Total: 4.00 km^{2} (1.54 sq mi)
- Elevation: 495 m (1,624 ft)

Population (2025)
  - Total: 267
- Time zone: UTC+1 (CET)
  - Summer (DST): UTC+2 (CEST)
- Postal code: 170 5
- Area code: +421 42
- Vehicle registration plate (until 2022): PB
- Website: www.kostolec.sk

Kostolec (Hungarian: Kosfalu) is a village and municipality in Považská Bystrica District in the Trenčín Region of north-western Slovakia.

== History ==
In historical records the village was first mentioned in 1430.

== Geography ==
The municipality lies at an altitude of 495 metres (1,624 ft) and covers an area of 4.00 km^{2} (1.54 sq mi) (2025).

== Population ==
Population statistic (10 years)
Year	1995	2005	2015	2025
Count	239	251	230	267
Difference		+5.02%	−8.36%	+16.08%

Population statistic
Year	2024	2025
Count	272	267
Difference		−1.83%

It has a population of 267 people (31 December 2025).

=== Ethnicity ===
Census 2021 (1+ %)
Ethnicity	Number	Fraction
Slovak	245	98.79%
Total	248	

In year 2021 was 248 people by ethnicity 245 as Slovak, 2 as Czech and 1 as Not found out.

Note on population: The difference values of population numbers in the table "Population statistic" and in the sections "Ethnicity" & "Religion" is caused by the use of various statistical methods.

=== Religion ===
Census 2021 (1+ %)
Religion	Number	Fraction
Roman Catholic Church	194	78.23%
Evangelical Church	23	9.27%
None	20	8.06%
Other	5	2.02%
Not found out	3	1.21%
Total	248	

In year 2021 was 248 people by religion 194 from Roman Catholic Church, 23 from Evangelical Church, 20 from None, 5 from Other, 3 from Not found out, 1 from United Methodist Church, 1 from Buddhism and 1 from Ad hoc movements.

== Genealogical resources ==
The records for genealogical research are available at the state archive "Statny Archiv in Bytca, Slovakia"

- Roman Catholic church records (births/marriages/deaths): 1764-1895 (parish B)
- Lutheran church records (births/marriages/deaths): 1801-1907 (parish B)

== See also ==
- List of municipalities and towns in Slovakia
