= Počarová =

- Municipality
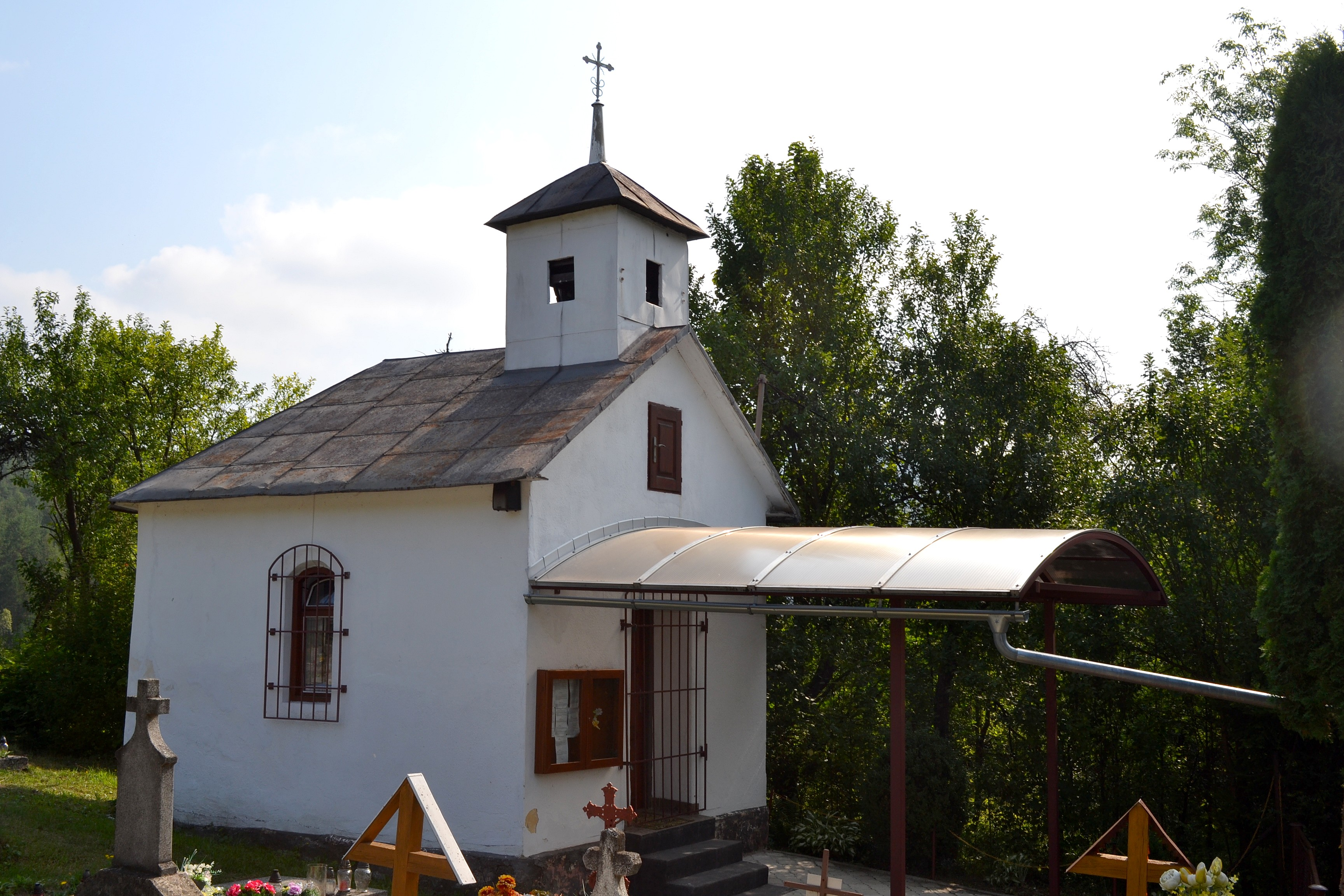

- Flag

- Location of Počarová in the Trenčín Region Location of Počarová in Slovakia
- Coordinates: 49.07°N 18.52°E
- Country: Slovakia
- Region: Trenčín Region
- District: Považská Bystrica District
- First mentioned: 1466

Area
  - Total: 2.31 km^{2} (0.89 sq mi)
- Elevation: 383 m (1,257 ft)

Population (2025)
  - Total: 161
- Time zone: UTC+1 (CET)
  - Summer (DST): UTC+2 (CEST)
- Postal code: 181 5
- Area code: +421 42
- Vehicle registration plate (until 2022): PB
- Website: www.pocarova.dcom.sk

Počarová (Hungarian: Pocsaró) is a village and municipality in Považská Bystrica District in the Trenčín Region of north-western Slovakia.

== History ==
In historical records the village was first mentioned in 1466.

== Geography ==
The municipality lies at an altitude of 383 metres (1,257 ft) and covers an area of 2.31 km^{2} (0.89 sq mi) (2025).

== Population ==
Population statistic (10 years)
Year	1995	2005	2015	2025
Count	141	144	142	161
Difference		+2.12%	−1.38%	+13.38%

Population statistic
Year	2024	2025
Count	158	161
Difference		+1.89%

It has a population of 161 people (31 December 2025).

=== Ethnicity ===
Census 2021 (1+ %)
Ethnicity	Number	Fraction
Slovak	148	99.32%
Czech	2	1.34%
Total	149	

In year 2021 was 149 people by ethnicity 148 as Slovak, 2 as Czech and 1 as Moravian.

Note on population: The difference values of population numbers in the table "Population statistic" and in the sections "Ethnicity" & "Religion" is caused by the use of various statistical methods.

=== Religion ===
Census 2021 (1+ %)
Religion	Number	Fraction
Roman Catholic Church	136	91.28%
None	11	7.38%
Total	149	

In year 2021 was 149 people by religion 136 from Roman Catholic Church, 11 from None, 1 from Calvinist Church and 1 from Other.
