= Hatane =

Village in Maharashtra

Hatane Hatne
- village
- Location in Maharashtra, India Hatane (India)
- Coordinates: 19.7547243°N 73.0493825°E
- Country: India
- State: Maharashtra
- District: Palghar
- Taluka: Vikramgad
- Elevation: 46 m (151 ft)

Population (2011)
  - Total: 661
- Time zone: UTC+5:30 (IST)
- 2011 census code: 551815

Hatane or Hatne is a village in the Palghar district of Maharashtra, India. It is located in the Vikramgad taluka.

== Demographics ==
According to the 2011 census of India, Hatane has 145 households. The effective literacy rate (i.e. the literacy rate of population excluding children aged 6 and below) is 70.45%.

Demographics (2011 Census)
	Total	Male	Female
Population	661	343	318
Children aged below 6 years	106	55	51
Scheduled caste	2	1	1
Scheduled tribe	511	251	260
Literates	391	231	160
Workers (all)	409	216	193
Main workers (total)	144	84	60
Main workers: Cultivators	46	26	20
Main workers: Agricultural labourers	26	10	16
Main workers: Household industry workers	0	0	0
Main workers: Other	72	48	24
Marginal workers (total)	265	132	133
Marginal workers: Cultivators	62	43	19
Marginal workers: Agricultural labourers	102	30	72
Marginal workers: Household industry workers	1	1	0
Marginal workers: Others	100	58	42
Non-workers	252	127	125
