= Hatné =

Municipality of Slovakia

- Municipality
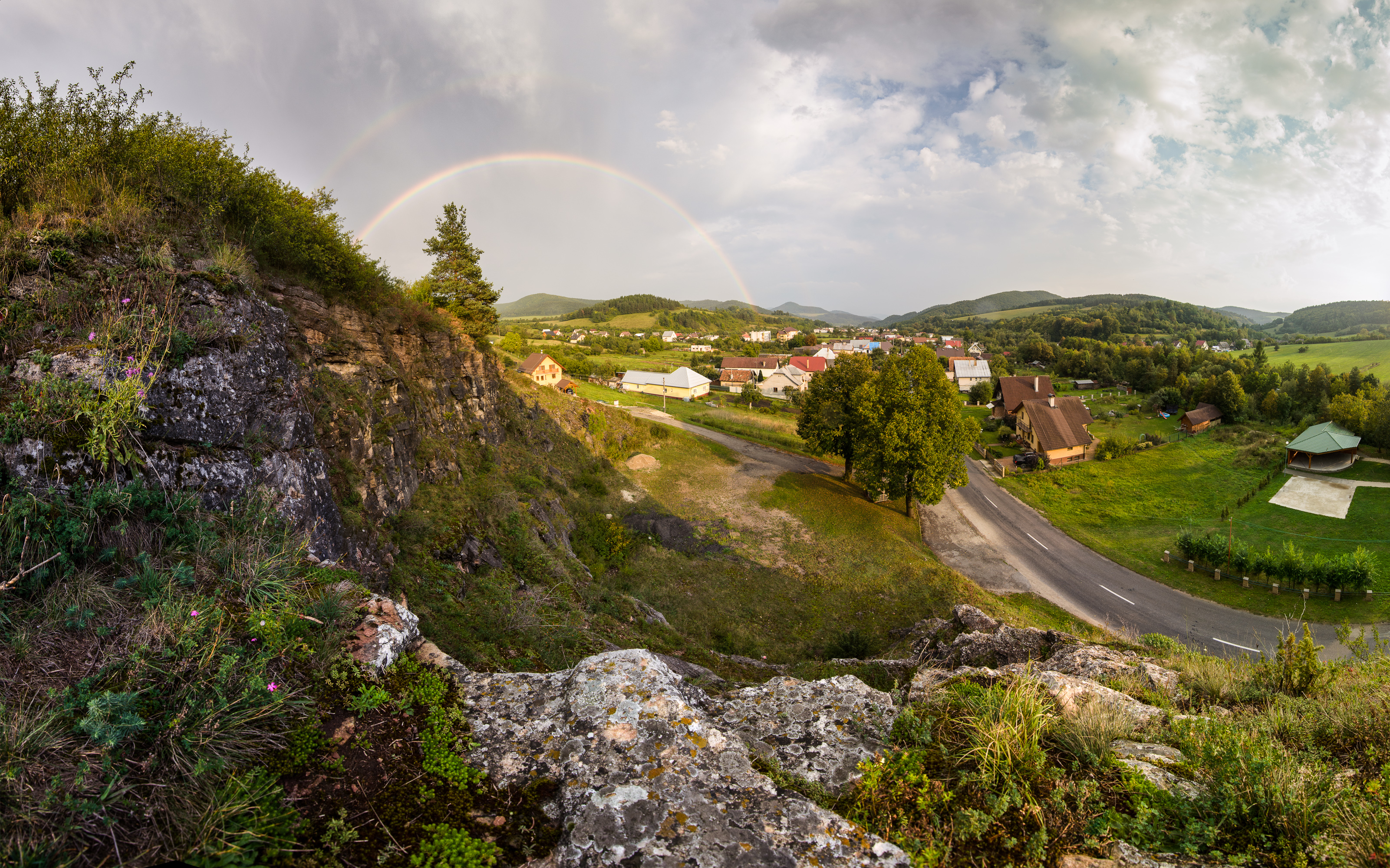

- Flag

- Location of Hatné in the Trenčín Region Location of Hatné in Slovakia
- Coordinates: 49.18°N 18.38°E
- Country: Slovakia
- Region: Trenčín Region
- District: Považská Bystrica District
- First mentioned: 1321

Area
  - Total: 5.43 km^{2} (2.10 sq mi)
- Elevation: 313 m (1,027 ft)

Population (2025)
  - Total: 631
- Time zone: UTC+1 (CET)
  - Summer (DST): UTC+2 (CEST)
- Postal code: 180 2
- Area code: +421 42
- Vehicle registration plate (until 2022): PB
- Website: hatne.sk

Hatné (Hungarian: Hatna) is a village and municipality in Považská Bystrica District in the Trenčín Region of north-western Slovakia.

== History ==
In historical records the village was first mentioned in 1321.

== Geography ==
The municipality lies at an altitude of 313 metres (1,027 ft) and covers an area of 5.43 km^{2} (2.10 sq mi) (2025).

== Population ==
Population statistic (10 years)
Year	1995	2005	2015	2025
Count	588	571	599	631
Difference		−2.89%	+4.90%	+5.34%

Population statistic
Year	2024	2025
Count	632	631
Difference		−0.15%

It has a population of 631 people (31 December 2025).

=== Ethnicity ===
Census 2021 (1+ %)
Ethnicity	Number	Fraction
Slovak	627	98.58%
Not found out	7	1.1%
Total	636	

In year 2021 was 636 people by ethnicity 627 as Slovak, 7 as Not found out, 4 as Polish, 1 as Czech, 1 as Irish, 1 as Serbian and 1 as Hungarian.

Note on population: The difference values of population numbers in the table "Population statistic" and in the sections "Ethnicity" & "Religion" is caused by the use of various statistical methods.

=== Religion ===
Census 2021 (1+ %)
Religion	Number	Fraction
Roman Catholic Church	543	85.38%
None	62	9.75%
Not found out	13	2.04%
Evangelical Church	7	1.1%
Total	636	

In year 2021 was 636 people by religion 543 from Roman Catholic Church, 62 from None, 13 from Not found out, 7 from Evangelical Church, 4 from Greek Catholic Church, 4 from Ad hoc movements, 1 from Eastern Orthodox Church, 1 from Christian Congregations in Slovakia and 1 from Other.

== Genealogical resources ==
The records for genealogical research are available at the state archive "Statny Archiv in Bytca, Slovakia"

- Roman Catholic church records (births/marriages/deaths): 1756-1895 (parish B)

== See also ==
- List of municipalities and towns in Slovakia
