= Považská Bystrica District =

Coordinates: 49°7′2″N 18°26′54″E

- District
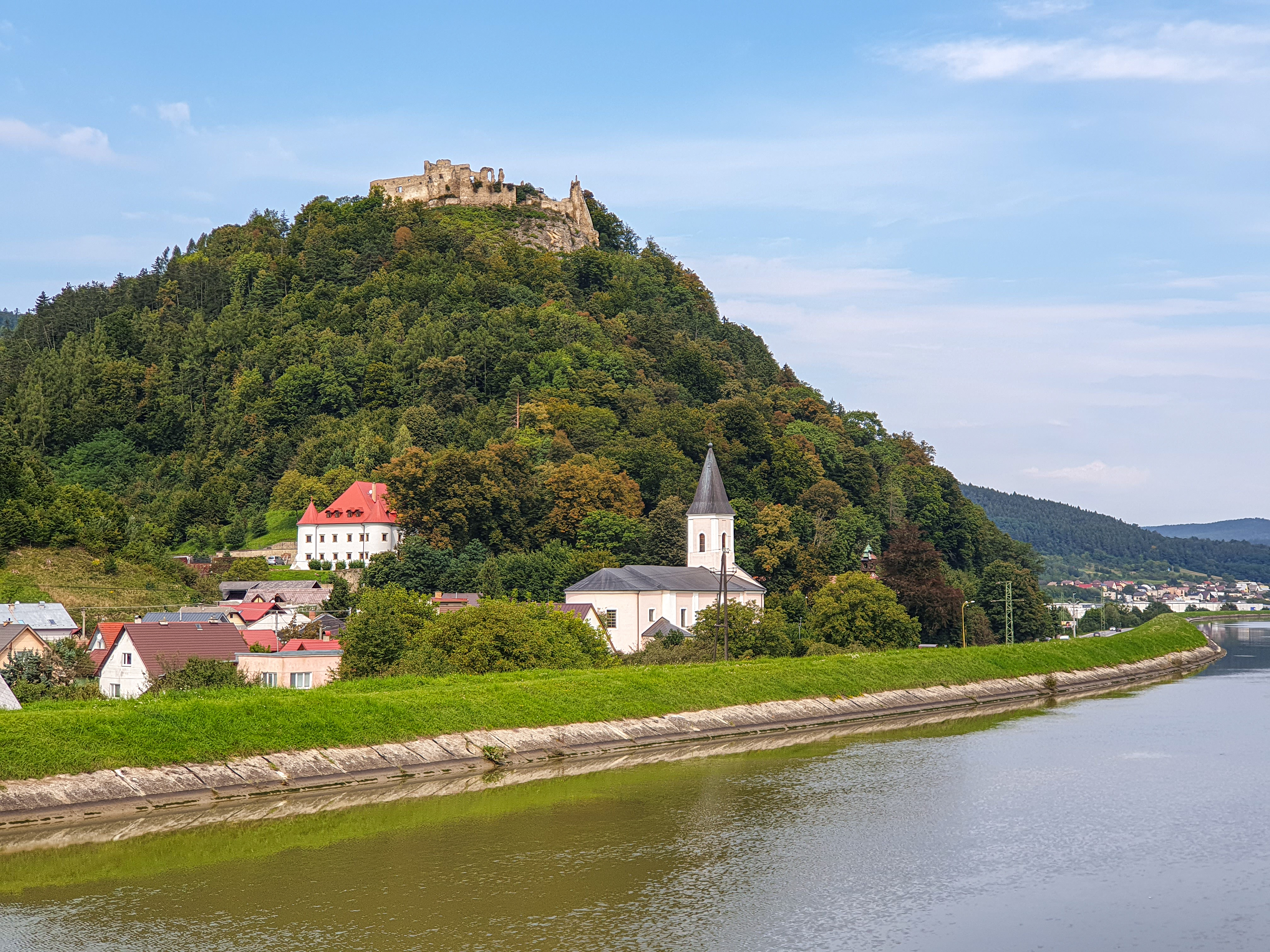
- Country: Slovakia
- Region (kraj): Trenčín Region
- Seat: Považská Bystrica

Area
  - Total: 463.15 km^{2} (178.82 sq mi)

Population (2025)
  - Total: 60,099
- Time zone: UTC+1 (CET)
  - Summer (DST): UTC+2 (CEST)
- Telephone prefix: 042
- Vehicle registration plate (until 2022): PB
- Municipalities: 28

Považská Bystrica District (Slovak: okres Považská Bystrica, pronounced [ˈɔkres ˈpɔʋaʂskaː ˈbistritsa]; Hungarian: Vágbesztercei járás) is a district in the Trenčín Region of western Slovakia. Until 1918, the district was part of the county of Kingdom of Hungary of Trencsén.

== Population ==
Population statistic (10 years)
Year	1995	2005	2015	2025
Count	65,580	64,549	63,025	60,099
Difference		−1.57%	−2.36%	−4.64%

Population statistic
Year	2024	2025
Count	60,361	60,099
Difference		−0.43%

It has a population of 60,099 people (31 December 2025).

Historical population
Year	Pop.	±%
1970	51,359	—
1980	56,375	+9.8%
1991	63,033	+11.8%
2001	65,150	+3.4%
2011	63,550	−2.5%
2021	61,617	−3.0%
Source: Statistical Office of the Slovak Republic

=== Ethnicity ===
Census 2021 (1+ %)
Ethnicity	Number	Fraction
Slovak	58,484	93.45%
Not found out	2816	4.49%
Total	62,582	

In year 2021 was 62,582 people by ethnicity 58,484 as Slovak, 2816 as Not found out, 546 as Czech, 207 as Other, 83 as Russian, 69 as Moravian, 68 as Hungarian, 52 as Polish, 40 as German, 36 as Romani, 32 as Ukrainian, 30 as Rusyn, 20 as English, 18 as Italian, 15 as Serbian, 9 as French, 7 as Jewish, 7 as Vietnamese, 6 as Austrian, 6 as Croatian, 5 as Canadian, 4 as Silesian, 4 as Korean, 4 as Bulgarian, 3 as Irish, 3 as Greek, 2 as Turkish, 2 as Romanian, 2 as Iranian and 2 as Albanian.

Note on population: The difference values of population numbers in the table "Population statistic" and in the sections "Ethnicity" & "Religion" is caused by the use of various statistical methods.

=== Religion ===
Census 2021 (1+ %)
Religion	Number	Fraction
Roman Catholic Church	44,344	71.97%
None	11,370	18.45%
Not found out	3343	5.43%
Evangelical Church	1088	1.77%
Total	61,617	

In year 2021 was 61,617 people by religion 44,344 from Roman Catholic Church, 11,370 from None, 3343 from Not found out, 1088 from Evangelical Church, 284 from Greek Catholic Church, 251 from Other, 220 from Ad hoc movements, 175 from Christian Congregations in Slovakia, 117 from Other and not ascertained christian church, 71 from Eastern Orthodox Church, 69 from Buddhism, 56 from Paganism and natural spirituality, 51 from Calvinist Church, 45 from Jehovah's Witnesses, 44 from Seventh-day Adventist Church, 22 from Islam, 22 from Apostolic Church, 14 from Hinduism, 8 from Jewish community, 8 from Old Catholic Church, 5 from United Methodist Church, 4 from Church of the Brethren, 3 from Czechoslovak Hussite Church, 2 from Church of Jesus Christ of Latter-day Saints and 1 from Bahá'i Community.

== Municipalities ==
Municipality	Area [km^{2}]	Population
Bodiná	7.47	476
Brvnište	6.93	1,147
Čelkova Lehota	3.70	157
Dolná Mariková	22.12	1,406
Dolný Lieskov	16.47	786
Domaniža	26.05	1,614
Ďurďové	4.81	172
Hatné	5.43	631
Horná Mariková	47.54	589
Horný Lieskov	4.89	507
Jasenica	7.29	1,274
Klieština	5.31	332
Kostolec	4.00	267
Malé Lednice	14.99	493
Papradno	55.81	2,373
Plevník-Drienové	13.00	1,716
Počarová	2.31	161
Podskalie	7.68	156
Považská Bystrica	90.55	36,690
Prečín	17.63	1,555
Pružina	40.43	2,109
Sádočné	7.50	159
Slopná	7.64	494
Stupné	7.51	690
Sverepec	6.23	1,428
Udiča	22.14	2,237
Vrchteplá	4.89	251
Záskalie	2.38	229

Population and area values are current for year 2025.

== See also ==
- Dolný Moštenec
