= Domaniža =

- Municipality
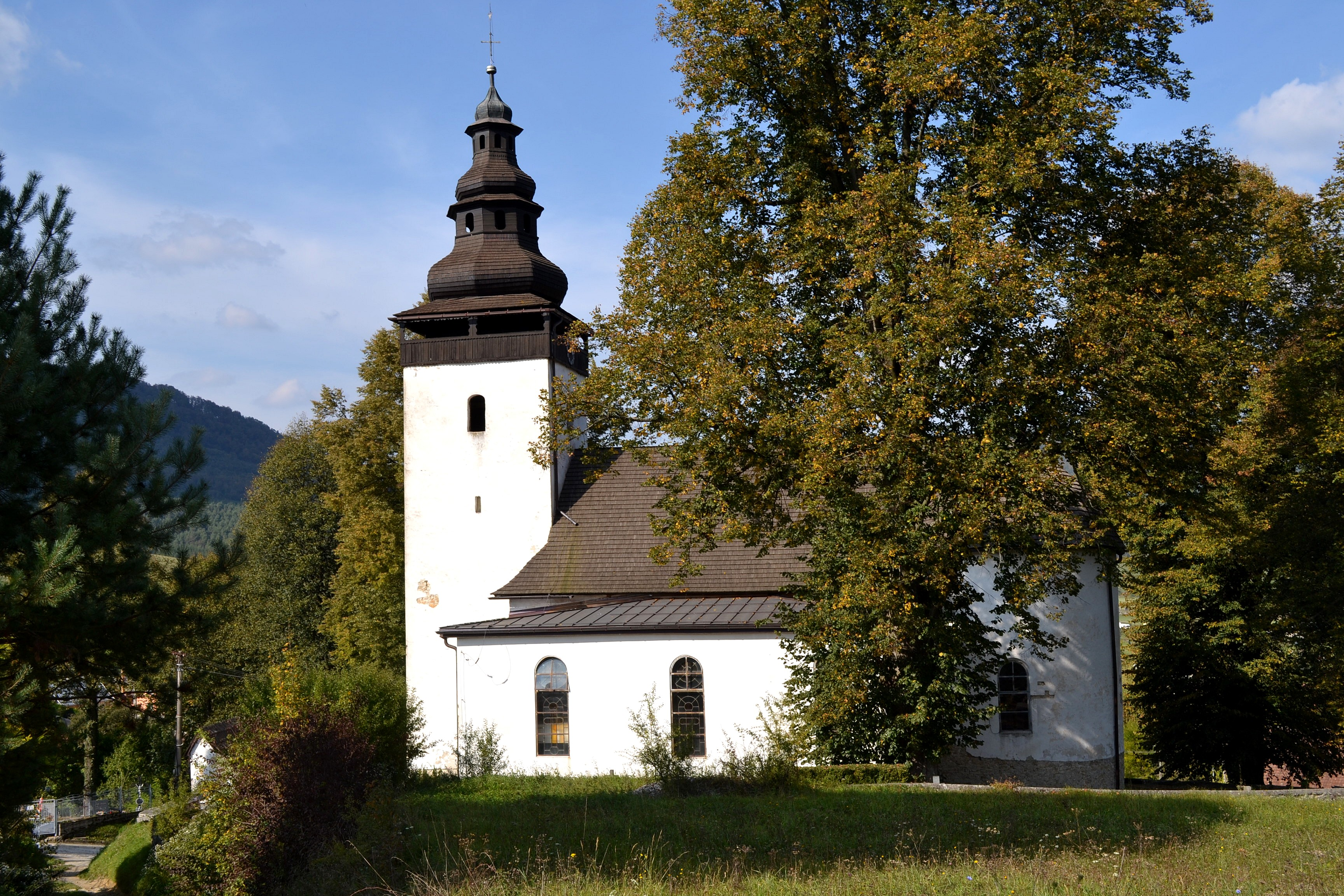

- Flag

- Location of Domaniža in the Trenčín Region Location of Domaniža in Slovakia
- Coordinates: 49.05°N 18.55°E
- Country: Slovakia
- Region: Trenčín Region
- District: Považská Bystrica District
- First mentioned: 1268

Area
  - Total: 26.05 km^{2} (10.06 sq mi)
- Elevation: 382 m (1,253 ft)

Population (2025)
  - Total: 1,614
- Time zone: UTC+1 (CET)
  - Summer (DST): UTC+2 (CEST)
- Postal code: 181 6
- Area code: +421 42
- Vehicle registration plate (until 2022): PB
- Website: www.domaniza.sk

Domaniža (Hungarian: Demény) is a village and municipality in Považská Bystrica District in the Trenčín Region of north-western Slovakia.

== History ==
In historical records, the village was first mentioned in 1268.

== Geography ==
The municipality lies at an altitude of 382 metres (1,253 ft) and covers an area of 26.05 km^{2} (10.06 sq mi) (2025).

== Population ==
Population statistic (10 years)
| Year | 1995 | 2005 | 2015 | 2025 |
|---|---|---|---|---|
| Count | 1533 | 1490 | 1541 | 1614 |
| Difference | | −2.80% | +3.42% | +4.73% |

Population statistic
| Year | 2024 | 2025 |
|---|---|---|
| Count | 1644 | 1614 |
| Difference | | −1.82% |

It has a population of 1614 people (31 December 2025).

=== Ethnicity ===
Census 2021 (1+ %)
| Ethnicity | Number | Fraction |
|---|---|---|
| Slovak | 1546 | 96.56% |
| Not found out | 59 | 3.68% |
| Total | 1601 | |

In year 2021 was 1601 people by ethnicity 1546 as Slovak, 59 as Not found out, 11 as Czech, 8 as Other, 4 as Russian, 3 as Moravian, 2 as Ukrainian, 2 as Italian, 1 as Rusyn and 1 as French.

Note on population: The difference values of population numbers in the table "Population statistic" and in the sections "Ethnicity" & "Religion" is caused by the use of various statistical methods.

=== Religion ===
Census 2021 (1+ %)
| Religion | Number | Fraction |
|---|---|---|
| Roman Catholic Church | 1307 | 81.64% |
| None | 171 | 10.68% |
| Not found out | 54 | 3.37% |
| Evangelical Church | 24 | 1.5% |
| Total | 1601 | |

In year 2021 was 1601 people by religion 1307 from Roman Catholic Church, 171 from None, 54 from Not found out, 24 from Evangelical Church, 14 from Christian Congregations in Slovakia, 13 from Other, 6 from Greek Catholic Church, 4 from Calvinist Church, 2 from Apostolic Church, 1 from Old Catholic Church, 1 from Paganism and natural spirituality, 1 from Other and not ascertained christian church, 1 from Jehovah's Witnesses, 1 from Seventh-day Adventist Church and 1 from Ad hoc movements.

== Genealogical resources ==
The records for genealogical research are available at the state archive "Statny Archiv in Bytca, Slovakia"

- Roman Catholic church records (births/marriages/deaths): 1670-1894 (parish A)

== Sport ==
Domaniža has football club TJ Partizán Domaniža, that plays in V. liga Severozápad HUMMEL ZsFZ.

== See also ==
- List of municipalities and towns in Slovakia
