= Stupné =

- Municipality
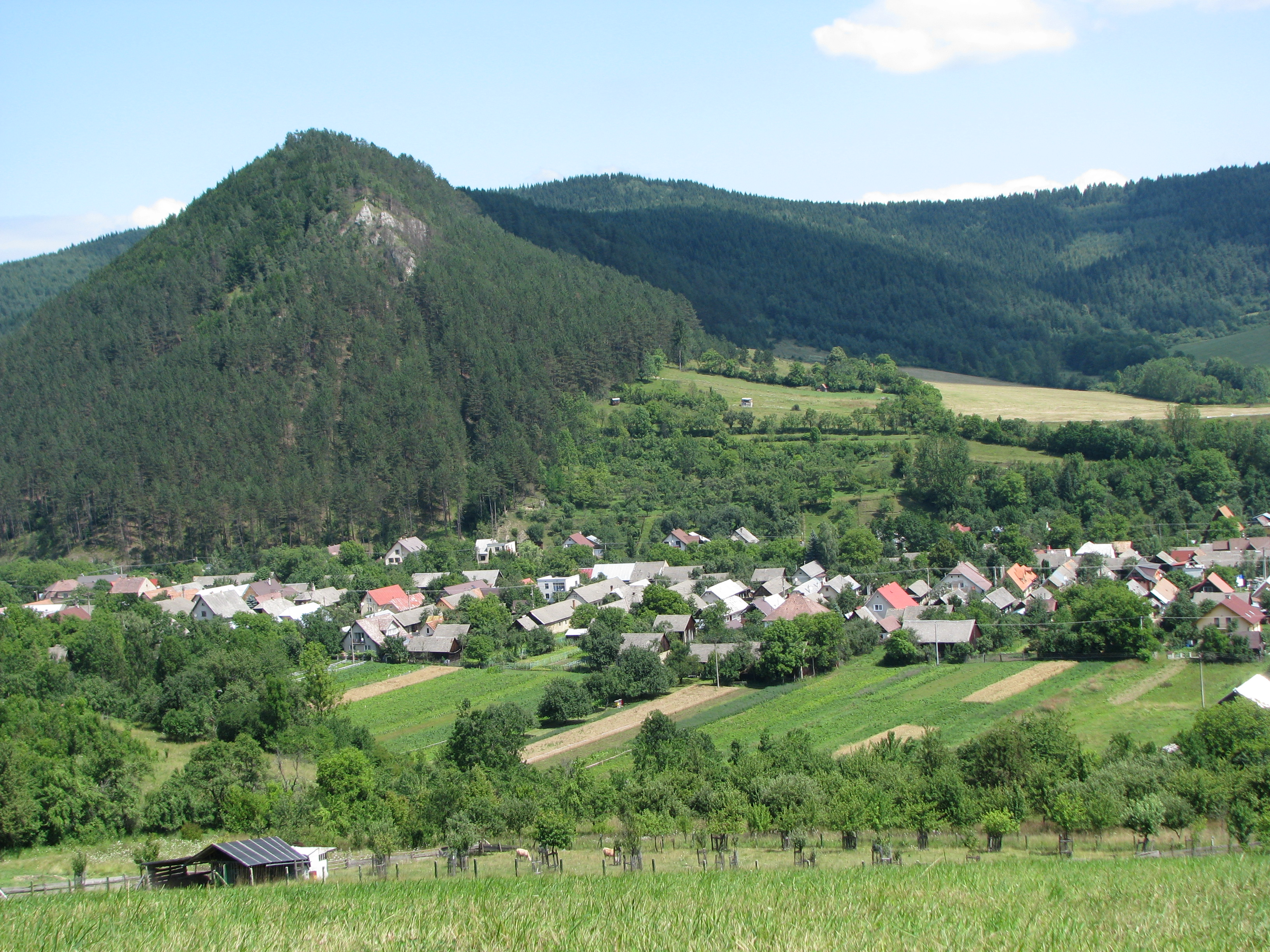

- Flag

- Location of Stupné in the Trenčín Region Location of Stupné in Slovakia
- Coordinates: 49.20°N 18.43°E
- Country: Slovakia
- Region: Trenčín Region
- District: Považská Bystrica District
- First mentioned: 1416

Area
  - Total: 7.51 km^{2} (2.90 sq mi)
- Elevation: 330 m (1,080 ft)

Population (2025)
  - Total: 690
- Time zone: UTC+1 (CET)
  - Summer (DST): UTC+2 (CEST)
- Postal code: 181 2
- Area code: +421 42
- Vehicle registration plate (until 2022): PB
- Website: www.obecstupne.sk

Stupné (Hungarian: Osztopna) is a village and municipality in Považská Bystrica District in the Trenčín Region of north-western Slovakia in Považie region.

== History ==
In historical records the village was first mentioned in 1416.

== Geography ==
The municipality lies at an altitude of 330 metres (1,080 ft) and covers an area of 7.51 km^{2} (2.90 sq mi) (2025).

== Population ==
Population statistic (10 years)
Year	1995	2005	2015	2025
Count	702	684	716	690
Difference		−2.56%	+4.67%	−3.63%

Population statistic
Year	2024	2025
Count	687	690
Difference		+0.43%

It has a population of 690 people (31 December 2025).

=== Ethnicity ===
Census 2021 (1+ %)
Ethnicity	Number	Fraction
Slovak	661	96.63%
Not found out	24	3.5%
Total	684	

In year 2021 was 684 people by ethnicity 661 as Slovak, 24 as Not found out, 2 as Czech, 1 as Romani, 1 as Russian, 1 as Polish and 1 as German.

Note on population: The difference values of population numbers in the table "Population statistic" and in the sections "Ethnicity" & "Religion" is caused by the use of various statistical methods.

=== Religion ===
Census 2021 (1+ %)
Religion	Number	Fraction
Roman Catholic Church	594	86.84%
None	51	7.46%
Not found out	25	3.65%
Total	684	

In year 2021 was 684 people by religion 594 from Roman Catholic Church, 51 from None, 25 from Not found out, 5 from Christian Congregations in Slovakia, 2 from Greek Catholic Church, 2 from Evangelical Church, 2 from Buddhism, 1 from Paganism and natural spirituality, 1 from Other and 1 from Ad hoc movements.
