= Vojtech Čelko =

Slovak historian (born 1946)

Vojtech Čelko (born 26 July 1946, Bratislava) is a Slovak historian.

He studied at FF UK in Prague and FF UJEP in Brno. He worked in Institute of history ČSAV and Oriental institute ČSAV. He worked in "Dům Slovenské kultury" in Prague in 1985–1993 (from 1990 as director) and then he worked in "Ústav pro soudobé dějiny AV ČR".
