= Peter Madáč =

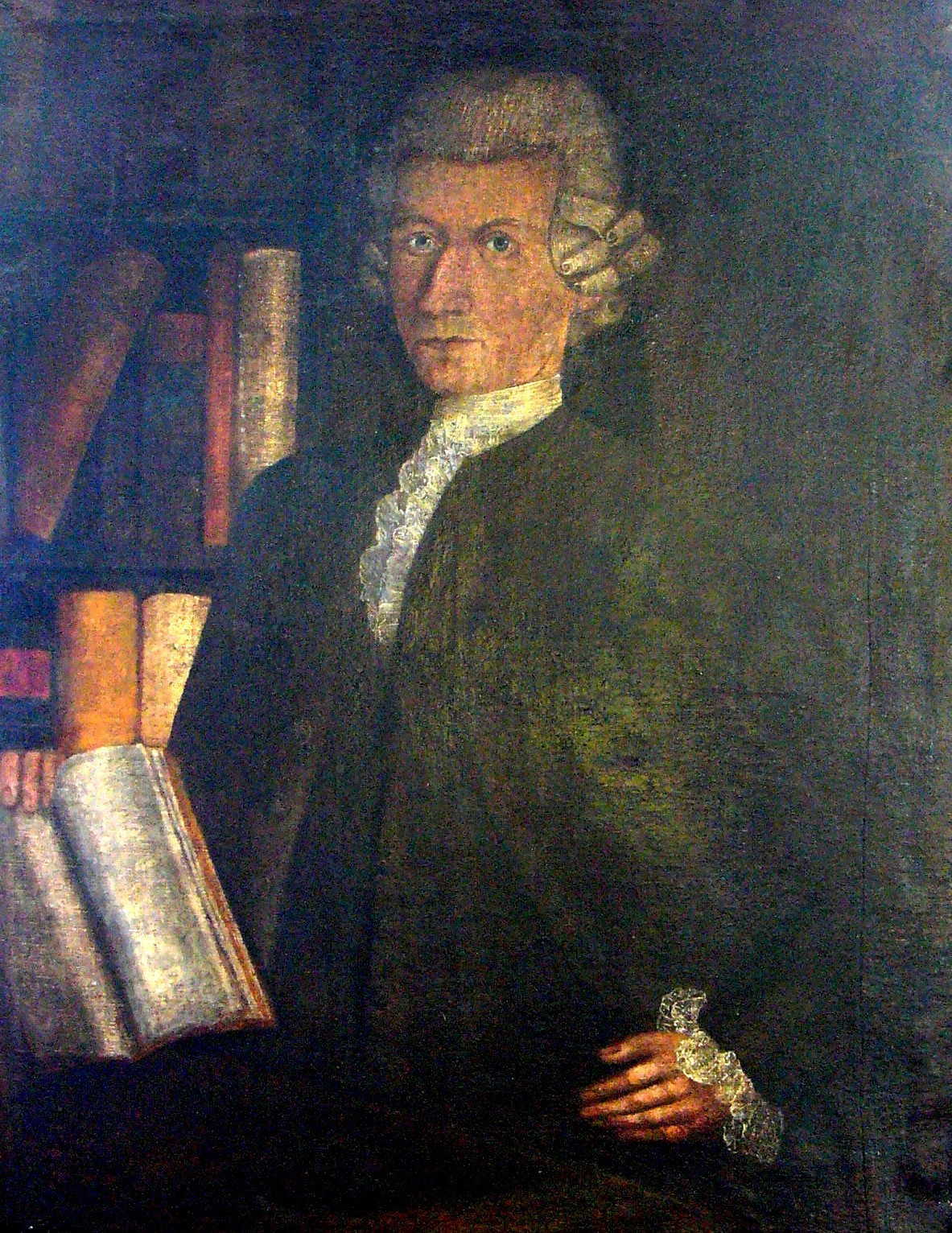
Peter Madáč

Peter Madáč (28 February 1729 in Veľká Poloma, now part of Gemerská Poloma – 24 November 1805, Rimavská Sobota) was a Slovak doctor, chemist, and professional writer and publicist. His father Juraj Madáč was a farmer from Veľká Poloma.

Peter Madáč obtained a basic education from the local Catholic school, and later studied in Horná Slaná and Patakiho Olácha. In 1743 he arrived in Štítnik and studied grammar, Latin, and the Catechetism under Tubelu. He studied at the school in Kežmarok, in Levoča, and in Debrecen, and from 1757 onwards studied medicine in Wittenberg, Leipzig, and Berlin.

Madáč laid the foundations of public health in Liptov in Malohont and also prepared a proposal for the training of midwives. His thesis on the regeneration of blood vessels and work on a chemical reaction earned him a medical degree from the University of Trnava.
