= Gemerská Poloma =

Gemerská Poloma Veszverés
- Municipality
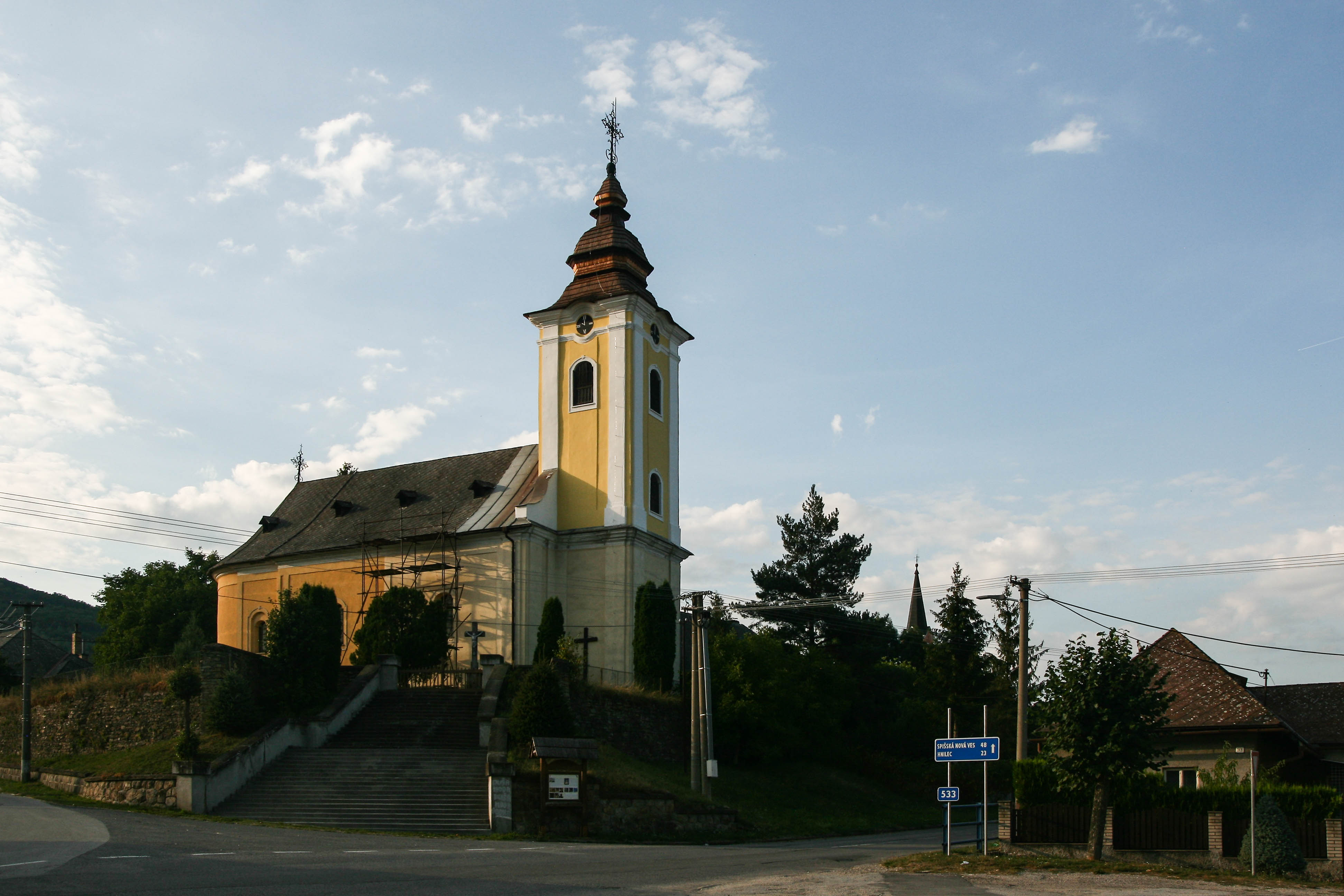

- Flag

- Location of Gemerská Poloma in the Košice Region Location of Gemerská Poloma in Slovakia
- Coordinates: 48.71°N 20.48°E
- Country: Slovakia
- Region: Košice Region
- District: Rožňava District
- First mentioned: 1282

Government
  - Mayor: Karol Horník

Area
  - Total: 57.63 km^{2} (22.25 sq mi)
- Elevation: 327 m (1,073 ft)

Population (2025)
  - Total: 1,893
- Time zone: UTC+1 (CET)
  - Summer (DST): UTC+2 (CEST)
- Postal code: 492 2
- Area code: +421 58
- Vehicle registration plate (until 2022): RV
- Website: www.gemerskapoloma.sk

Gemerská Poloma (Hungarian: Veszverés) is a village and large municipality in the Rožňava District. It is located in the Košice Region of middle-eastern Slovakia.

== History ==
The area of Gemerská Poloma was variously part of Great Moravia and the medieval Kingdom of Hungary. In 1241 the area was subject to Mongol invasion.

The first historical mention of the village was in 1282; as "Poloma". At the end of the 14th century, Poloma was divided into two distinct villages: Malá Poloma ("Small Poloma") and Veľká Poloma ("Big Poloma"). The two villages were ultimately united together again in 1958.

The original name of the village comes from polom, meaning "broken" in Slovak. The story says that there was a big storm one day nearby the current village in the mountains and ruined the dwellings of the inhabitants. They therefore chose to move away from the place and settle down closer to the river on the current village site.

Gemerská Poloma was invaded by the Ottoman Turks in 1557 and belonged to the Bebek family of Štítnik until the end of the 16th century.

Several people died from the cholera epidemic in the period 1873–1875.

Before the establishment of independent Czechoslovakia in 1918, Gemerská Poloma was part of Gömör and Kishont County within the Kingdom of Hungary. From 1939 to 1945, it was part of the Slovak Republic. On 23 January 1945, troops of the Romanian 4th Army entered Gemerská Poloma and it was once again part of Czechoslovakia.

== Geography ==
The municipality lies at an altitude of 327 metres (1,073 ft) and covers an area of 57.63 km^{2} (22.25 sq mi) (2025). The river Slana passes on the southern part of the village. There are three important mountains surrounding the village: Turecka on the south, Volovec on the south-west and Sulova on the north.

== Population ==
Population statistic (10 years)
Year	1995	2005	2015	2025
Count	1956	2029	2028	1893
Difference		+3.73%	−0.04%	−6.65%

Population statistic
Year	2024	2025
Count	1885	1893
Difference		+0.42%

It has a population of 1893 people (31 December 2025).

=== Ethnicity ===
Census 2021 (1+ %)
Ethnicity	Number	Fraction
Slovak	1868	96.04%
Romani	136	6.99%
Not found out	48	2.46%
Total	1945	

In year 2021 was 1945 people by ethnicity 1868 as Slovak, 136 as Romani, 48 as Not found out, 18 as Hungarian, 10 as Czech, 6 as Russian, 4 as German, 4 as Other and 1 as Rusyn.

Note on population: The difference values of population numbers in the table "Population statistic" and in the sections "Ethnicity" & "Religion" is caused by the use of various statistical methods.

=== Religion ===
Census 2021 (1+ %)
Religion	Number	Fraction
Evangelical Church	1011	51.98%
None	574	29.51%
Roman Catholic Church	262	13.47%
Not found out	59	3.03%
Total	1945	

In year 2021 was 1945 people by religion 1011 from Evangelical Church, 574 from None, 262 from Roman Catholic Church, 59 from Not found out, 10 from Jehovah's Witnesses, 9 from United Methodist Church, 7 from Greek Catholic Church, 7 from Apostolic Church, 2 from Ad hoc movements, 1 from Paganism and natural spirituality, 1 from Christian Congregations in Slovakia, 1 from Other and 1 from Buddhism.

== Culture ==
The village has a public library a swimming pool (non-functional) and a football pitch.

The most important people born in Gemerska Poloma are Peter Kellner-Hostinský and Peter Madáč. Peter Kellner-Hostinský (1823-1873) was an important writer, philosopher, historitian, economist. Peter Madac was a famous doctor of medicine and a specialist in physics.

== Genealogical resources ==
The records for genealogical research are available at the state archive "Statny Archiv in Kosice, Slovakia"

- Roman Catholic church records (births/marriages/deaths): 1777-1897 (parish A)
- Lutheran church records (births/marriages/deaths): 1784-1865 (parish A)

== See also ==
- Poloma, a town in Prešov Region
- List of municipalities and towns in Slovakia
