= Poloma =

- Municipality
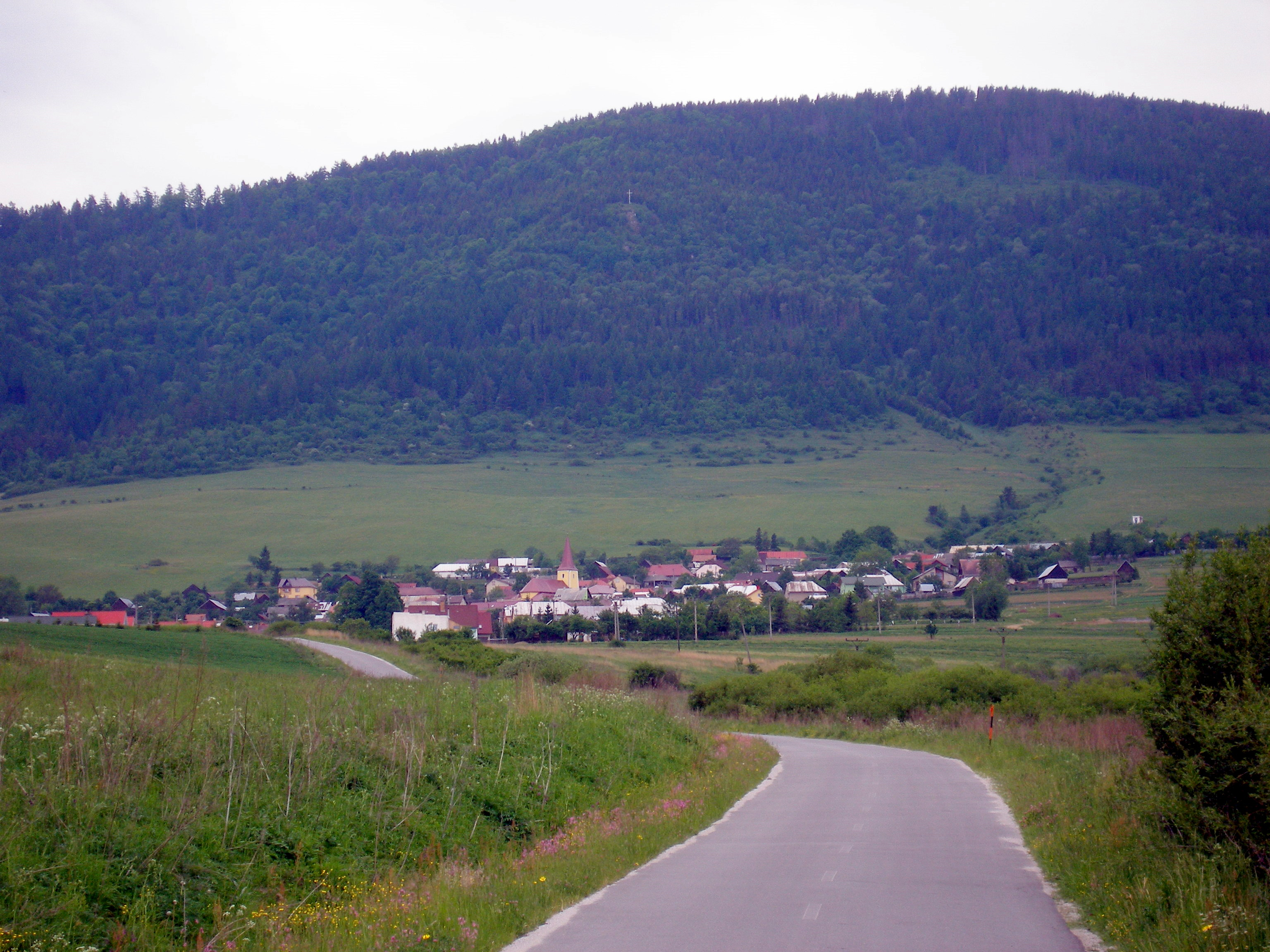

- Flag

- Location of Poloma in the Prešov Region Location of Poloma in Slovakia
- Coordinates: 49.17°N 20.83°E
- Country: Slovakia
- Region: Prešov Region
- District: Sabinov District
- First mentioned: 1330

Area
  - Total: 5.91 km^{2} (2.28 sq mi)
- Elevation: 582 m (1,909 ft)

Population (2025)
  - Total: 926
- Time zone: UTC+1 (CET)
  - Summer (DST): UTC+2 (CEST)
- Postal code: 827 3
- Area code: +421 51
- Vehicle registration plate (until 2022): SB
- Website: www.poloma.sk

Poloma is a village and municipality in Sabinov District in the Prešov Region of north-eastern Slovakia.

== History ==
In historical records the village was first mentioned in 1330.

== Geography ==
The municipality lies at an altitude of 582 metres (1,909 ft) and covers an area of 5.91 km^{2} (2.28 sq mi) (2025).

== Population ==
Population statistic (10 years)
Year	1995	2005	2015	2025
Count	921	966	944	926
Difference		+4.88%	−2.27%	−1.90%

Population statistic
Year	2024	2025
Count	944	926
Difference		−1.90%

It has a population of 926 people (31 December 2025).

=== Ethnicity ===
Census 2021 (1+ %)
Ethnicity	Number	Fraction
Slovak	920	98.6%
Not found out	12	1.28%
Total	933	

In year 2021 was 933 people by ethnicity 920 as Slovak, 12 as Not found out, 8 as Rusyn, 7 as Czech, 2 as German, 1 as Italian, 1 as Polish, 1 as Hungarian and 1 as Other.

Note on population: The difference values of population numbers in the table "Population statistic" and in the sections "Ethnicity" & "Religion" is caused by the use of various statistical methods.

=== Religion ===
Census 2021 (1+ %)
Religion	Number	Fraction
Roman Catholic Church	911	97.64%
Total	933	

In year 2021 was 933 people by religion 911 from Roman Catholic Church, 7 from Not found out, 7 from Greek Catholic Church, 6 from None, 1 from Evangelical Church and 1 from Seventh-day Adventist Church.

== See also ==
- Gemerská Poloma, a town in Košice Region, Slovakia
