= Štítnik =

Štítnik Csetnek
- Municipality
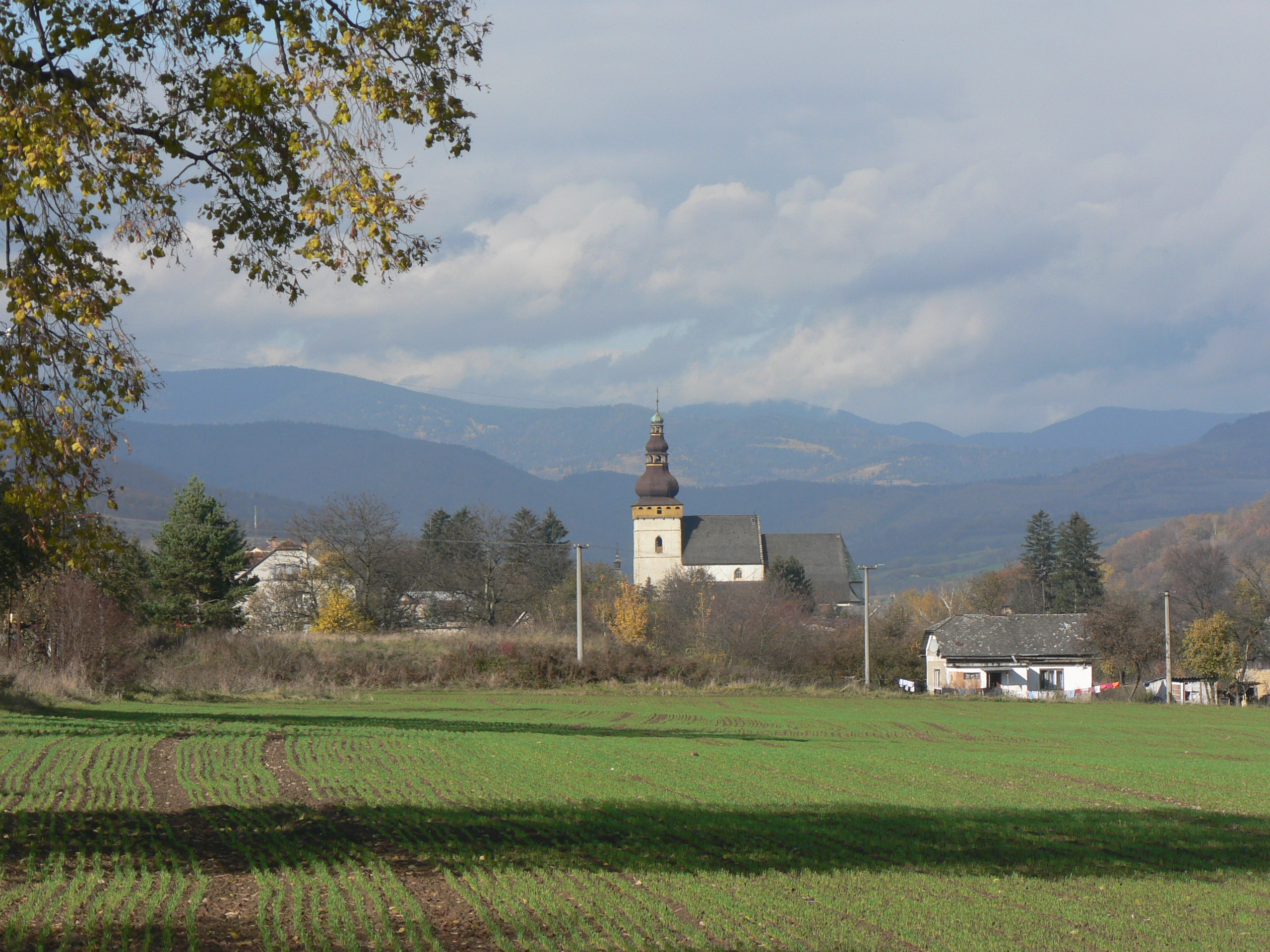

- Flag

- Location of Štítnik in the Košice Region Location of Štítnik in Slovakia
- Coordinates: 48.66°N 20.36°E
- Country: Slovakia
- Region: Košice Region
- District: Rožňava District
- First mentioned: 1243

Government
  - Mayor: Ladislav Belányi

Area
  - Total: 34.54 km^{2} (13.34 sq mi)
- Elevation: 284 m (932 ft)

Population (2025)
  - Total: 1,468
- Time zone: UTC+1 (CET)
  - Summer (DST): UTC+2 (CEST)
- Postal code: 493 2
- Area code: +421 58
- Vehicle registration plate (until 2022): RV
- Website: www.obecstitnik.sk

Štítnik (Hungarian: Csetnek) is a village and municipality in the Rožňava District in the Košice Region of middle-eastern Slovakia.

== Geography ==
The municipality lies at an altitude of 284 metres (932 ft) and covers an area of 34.54 km^{2} (13.34 sq mi) (2025).

The village is situated in the historical region of Gemer. It is located about 14 kilometers from Rožňava.

The village has a public library, high school and a football pitch. It also has a cinema.

== History ==
Historical discoveries prove that the origin of this settlement dates from the earlier part of the Middle Ages, from the 12th century. The name is Slovak and is derived from Slovak word štít meaning shield, and it could be related to the production of shields and weapons in village. It was mentioned for the first time in 1243 in a charter issued by Hungarian king Béla IV. for Dietrich and Filip from Akóš/Bebek noble family. Štítnik became dominion of Bebek family. Later, it had split up into two branches known by the centre of their dominion. Branch of Bebek family, which had centre in Štítnik became known as Lords of Štítnik (Štítnickí in Slovak, Csetneki in Hungarian).

In 1328 Štítnik got town privileges. During the Middle Ages, it had developed into an important mining town. History of the town was also connected with production of weapons. In 16th century Štítnik under influence of German miners converted to the Lutheranism. Already in the 16th century, first Latin school in the region was opened in Štítnik. In the same century, Štítnik was occupied by Ottomans.

Before the establishment of independent Czechoslovakia in 1918, Štítnik was part of Gömör and Kishont County within the Kingdom of Hungary. From 1939 to 1945, it was part of the Slovak Republic.

== Population ==
Population statistic (10 years)
Year	1995	2005	2015	2025
Count	1509	1508	1514	1468
Difference		−0.06%	+0.39%	−3.03%

Population statistic
Year	2024	2025
Count	1463	1468
Difference		+0.34%

It has a population of 1468 people (31 December 2025).

=== Ethnicity ===
Census 2021 (1+ %)
Ethnicity	Number	Fraction
Slovak	1403	94.92%
Romani	62	4.19%
Hungarian	41	2.77%
Not found out	27	1.82%
Czech	17	1.15%
Total	1478	

In year 2021 was 1478 people by ethnicity 1403 as Slovak, 62 as Romani, 41 as Hungarian, 27 as Not found out, 17 as Czech, 4 as Rusyn, 3 as Other, 1 as Jewish, 1 as Russian, 1 as Bulgarian and 1 as English.

Note on population: The difference values of population numbers in the table "Population statistic" and in the sections "Ethnicity" & "Religion" is caused by the use of various statistical methods.

=== Religion ===
Census 2021 (1+ %)
Religion	Number	Fraction
None	715	48.38%
Evangelical Church	541	36.6%
Roman Catholic Church	139	9.4%
Not found out	40	2.71%
Greek Catholic Church	15	1.01%
Total	1478	

In year 2021 was 1478 people by religion 715 from None, 541 from Evangelical Church, 139 from Roman Catholic Church, 40 from Not found out, 15 from Greek Catholic Church, 5 from Apostolic Church, 4 from Eastern Orthodox Church, 4 from Ad hoc movements, 3 from Jehovah's Witnesses, 2 from Calvinist Church, 2 from United Methodist Church, 2 from Buddhism, 1 from Old Catholic Church, 1 from Paganism and natural spirituality, 1 from Other and not ascertained christian church, 1 from Christian Congregations in Slovakia, 1 from Other and 1 from Hinduism.

== Historic buildings ==
=== Lutheran church ===
Three-nave Gothic basilica with a polygonal end of the presbytery and a tower was built in the 14th century. It stands on the site of an older Romanesque building from the 13th century. It is a representative family church of the local noble family of Lords from Štítnik (Štítnickí/Csetneki). Large areas of interior walls are covered with medieval frescoes, the oldest are from the last third of the 14th century, the younger from the late 15th and early 16th century. This is the largest collection of medieval murals in Slovakia. Gothic, Renaissance and Baroque styles are represented in this church. The baptistery is Gothic, made from bronze in 1454. Altar is in Renaissance style, with a mannerist painting of the birth of Christ from 1636 (the authorship of the altar paintings is attributed to Hans von Aachen, the court painter of Emperor Rudolf II.). Next to the altar is a Gothic carved stallum from the early 16th century. There are two organs in the church, a smaller Renaissance one from 1639 is located on the upper matroneum and it was donated to the church by the local landowner Gabriel Bakoš, a larger lower Baroque organ is from 1776. There are also numerous funeral monuments, gothic stone tombstones and medieval epitaphs and Renaissance mortuaries. The facades of the church are divided by supporting pillars and windows with a curved arch and linings. The corners have stone squaring. On the south facade is a fresco depicting St. Christopher.

Lutheran church in Štítnik is part of touristic route Gotická cesta (Gothic Route).

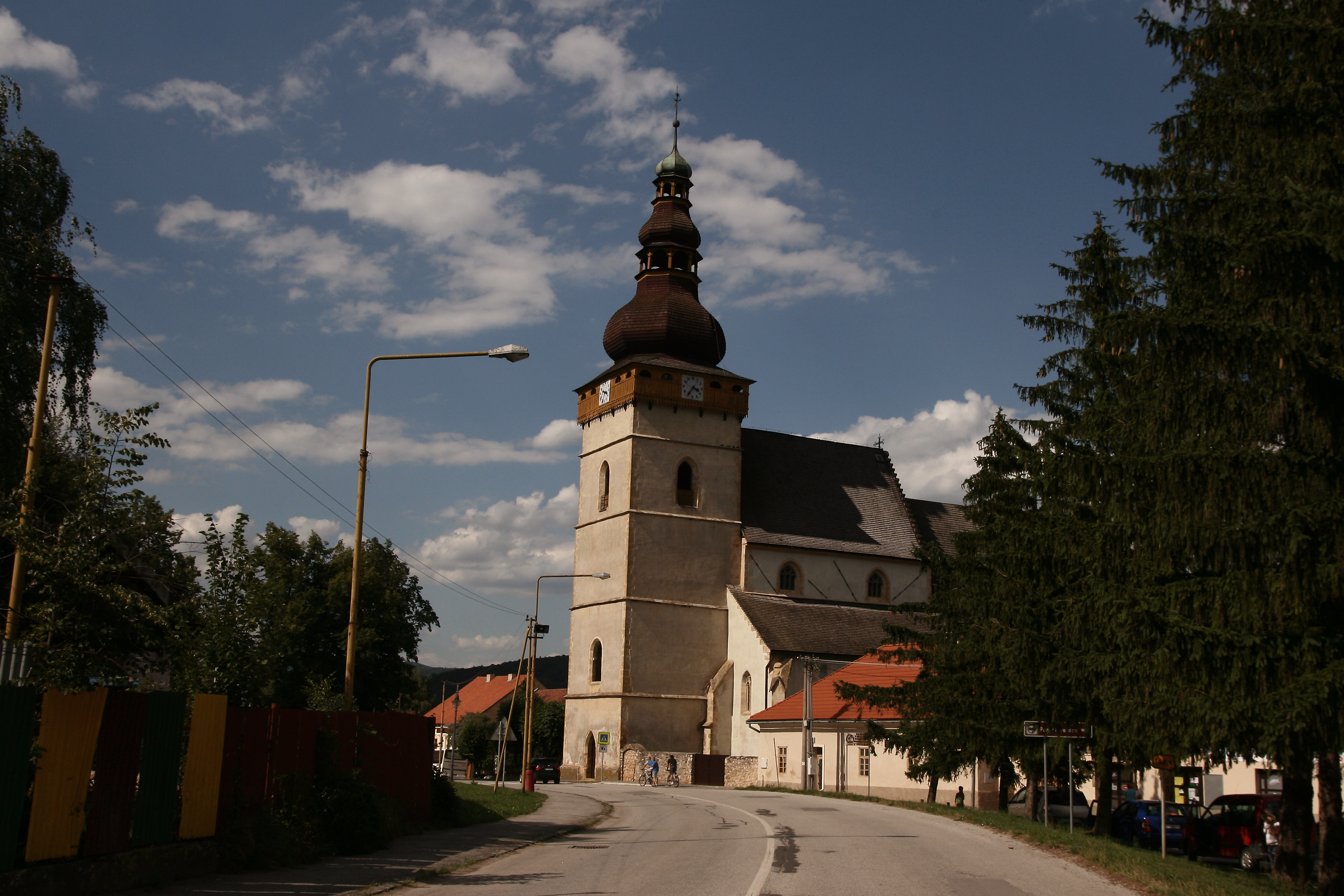
Gothic Lutheran church in Štítnik

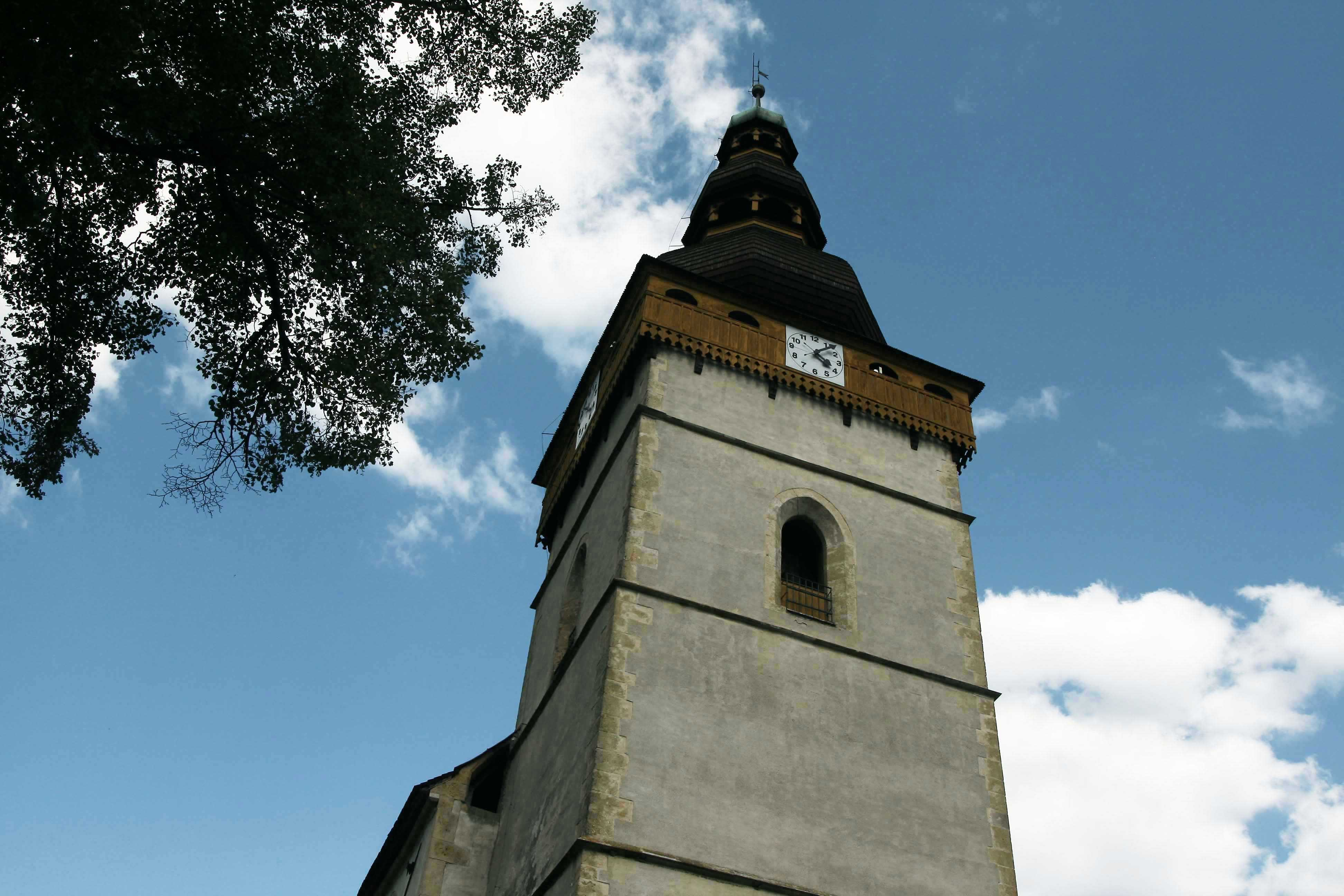
Tower of fothic Lutheran church in Štítnik

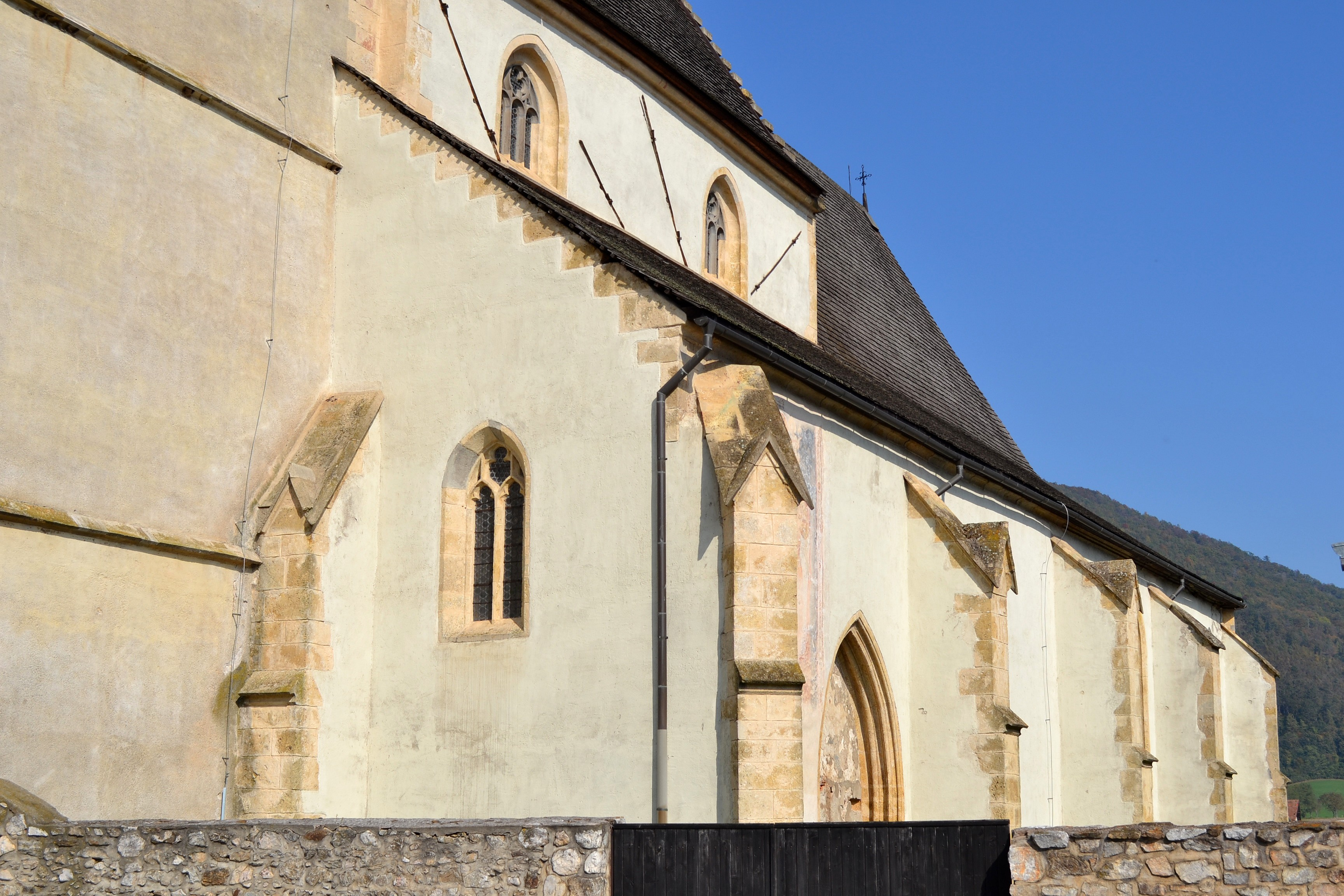
Side nave of Gothic Lutheran church in Štítnik

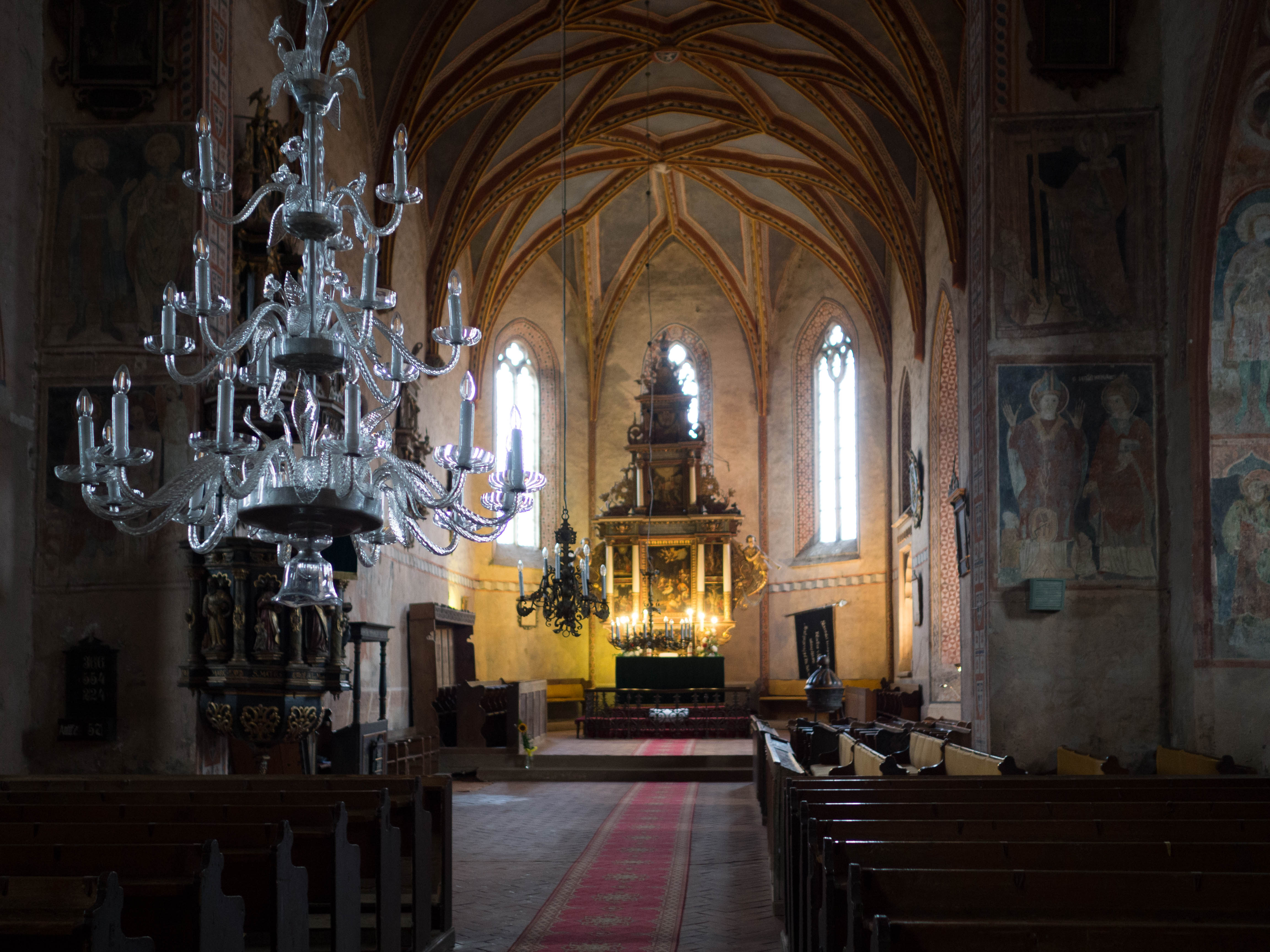
Interior of the Gothic Lutheran church in Štítnik

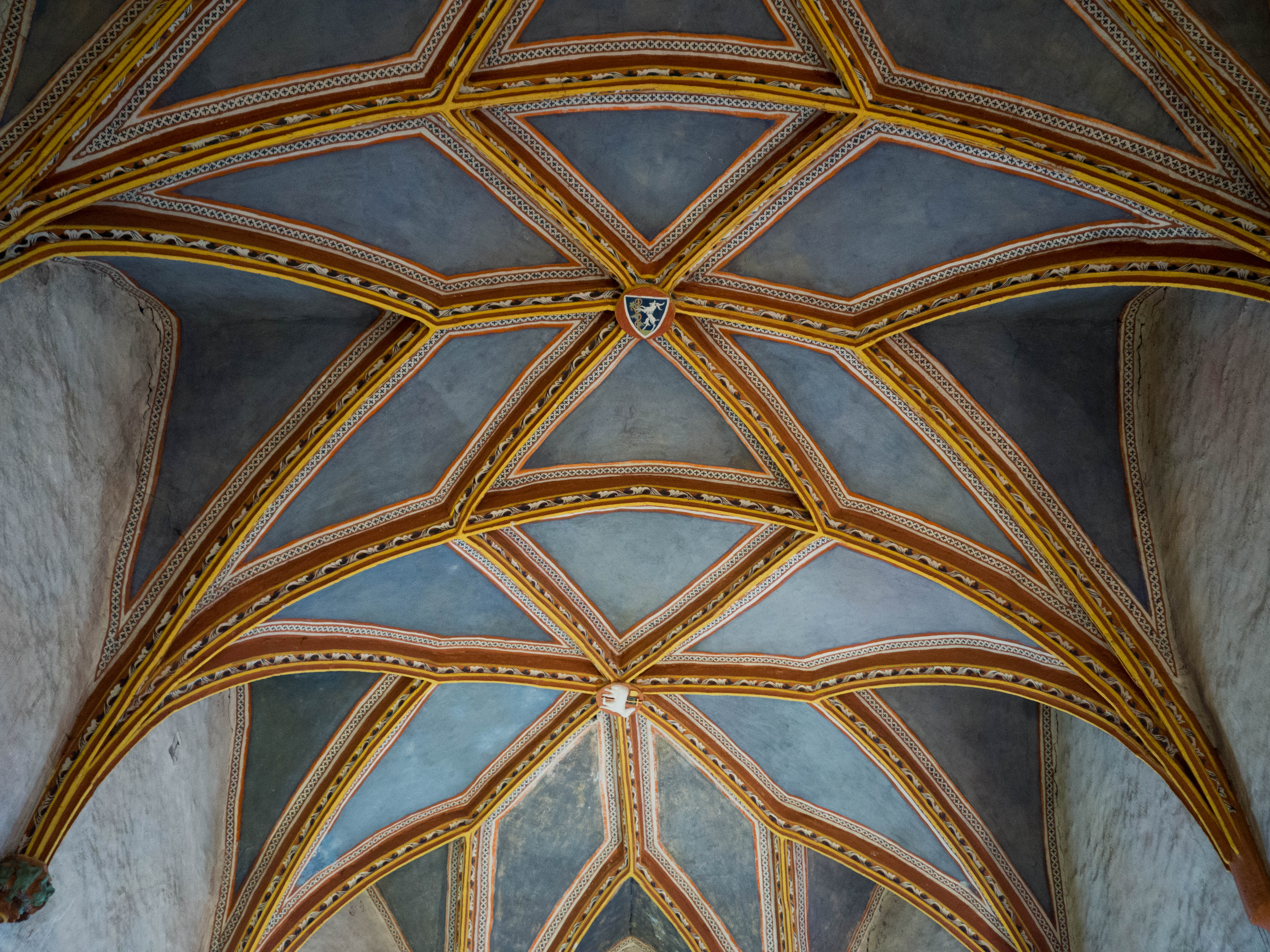
Gothic vaults of the Lutheran church in Štítnik

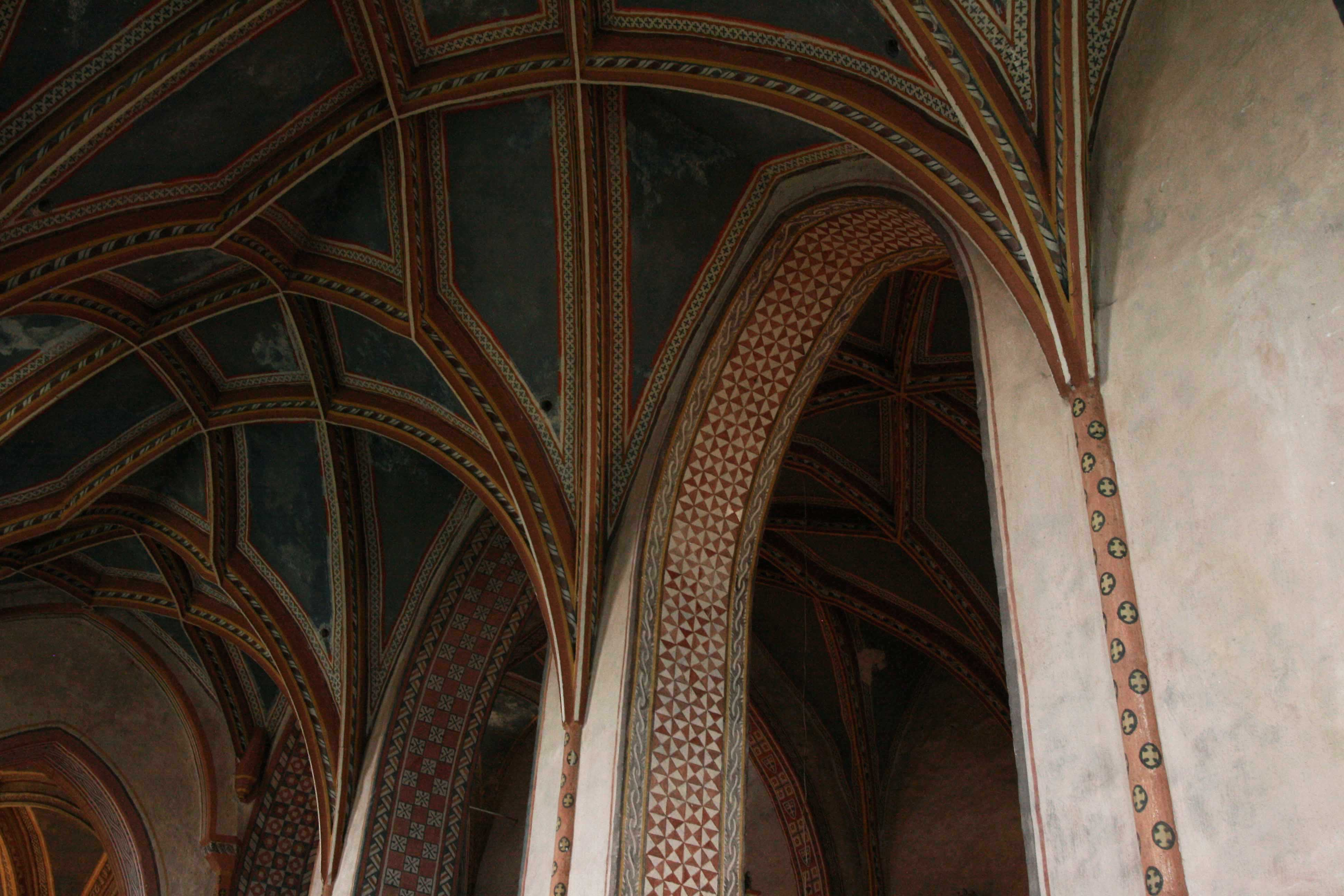
Gothic vaults of the Lutheran church in Štítnik

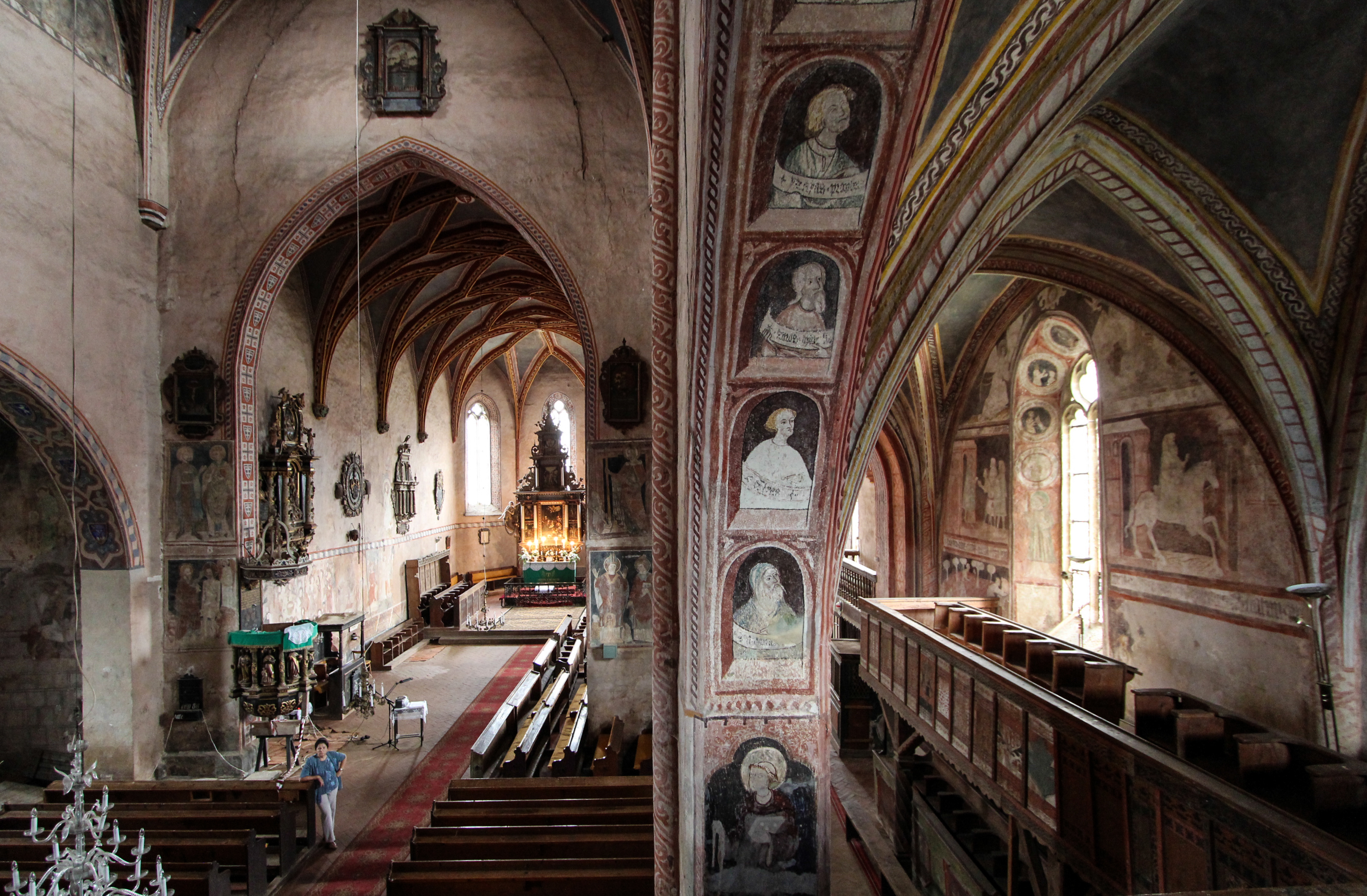
Interior of the Gothic Lutheran church in Štítnik with Gothic frescoes

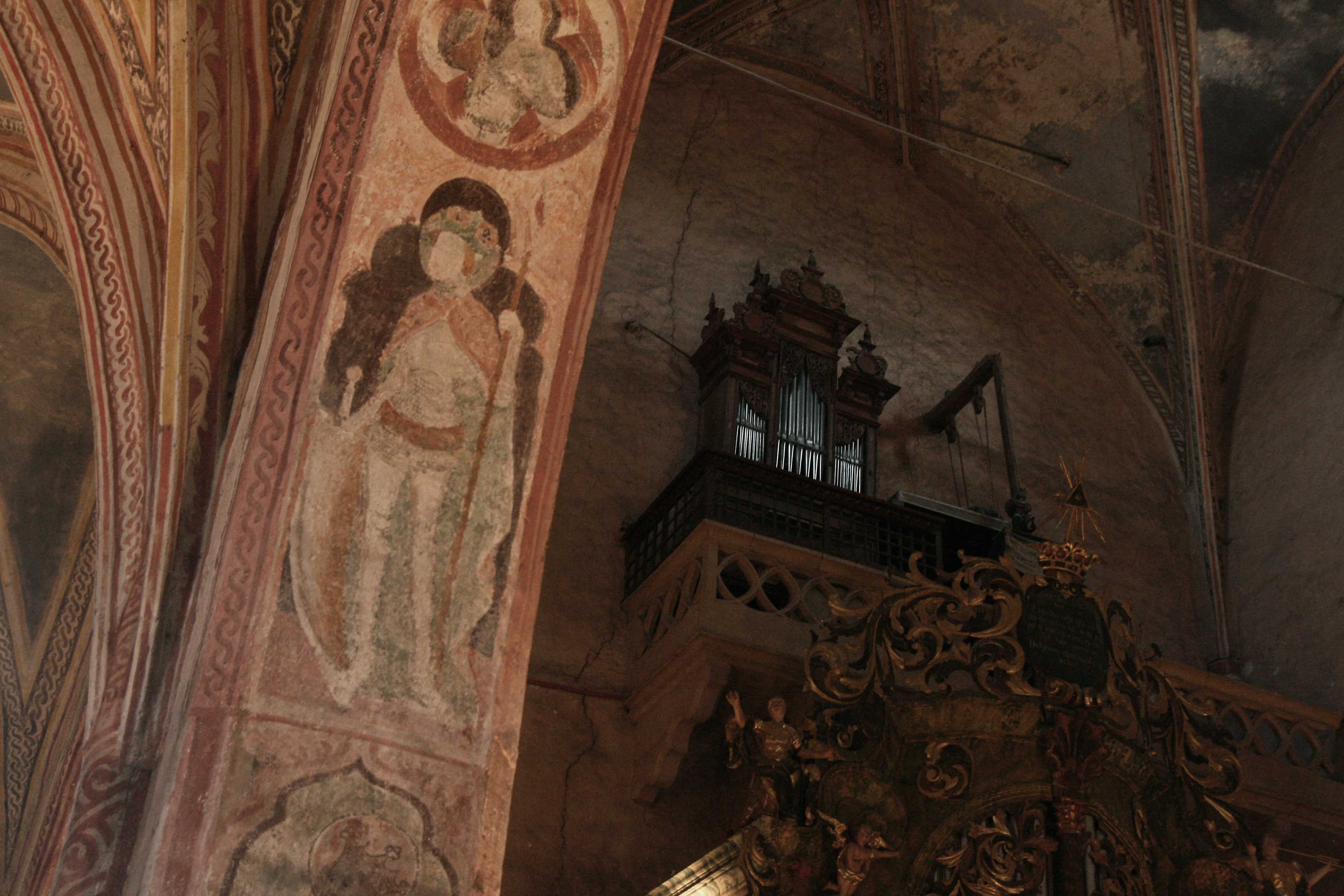
Gothic frescoes

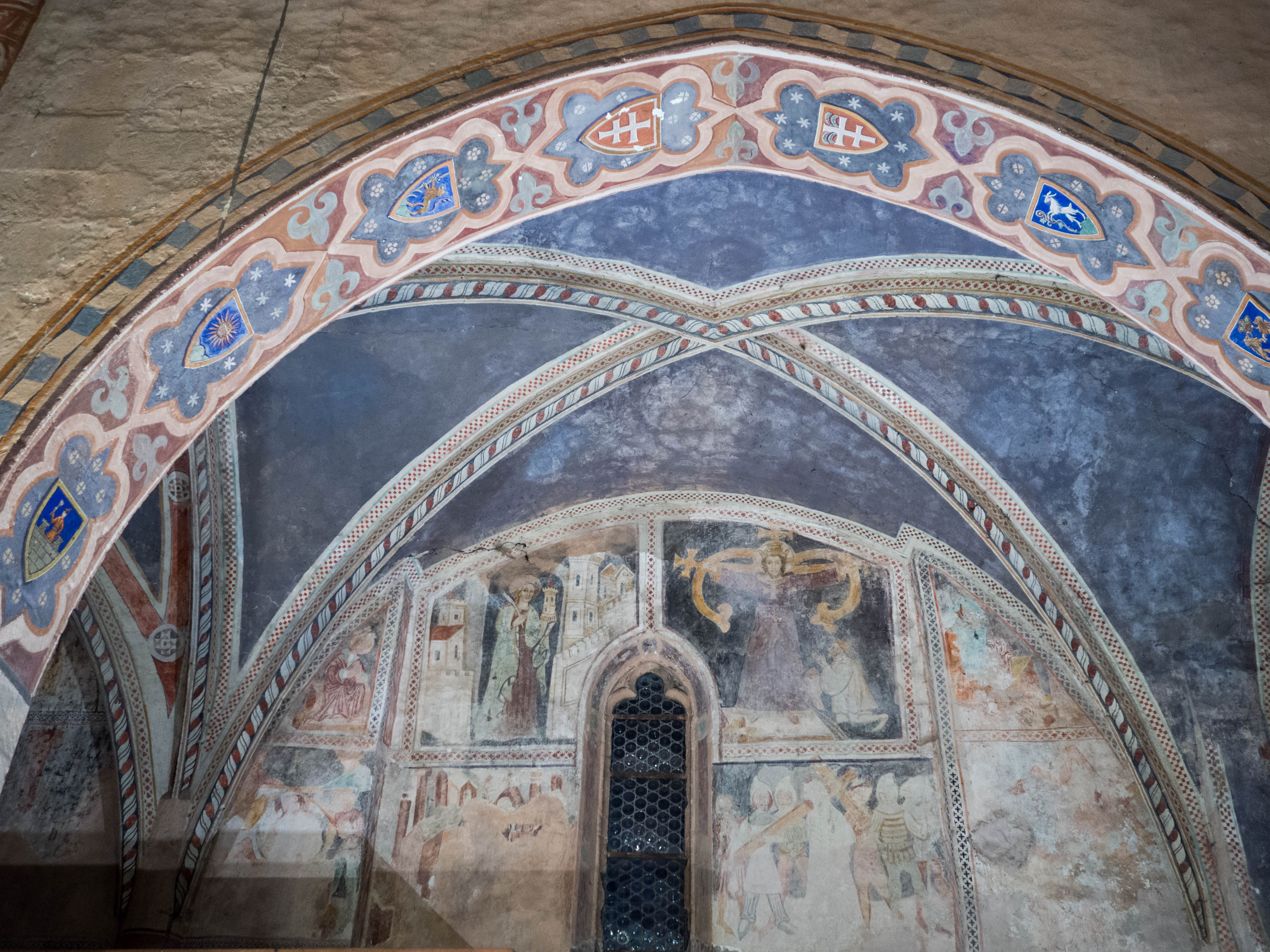
Gothic frescoes in side nave

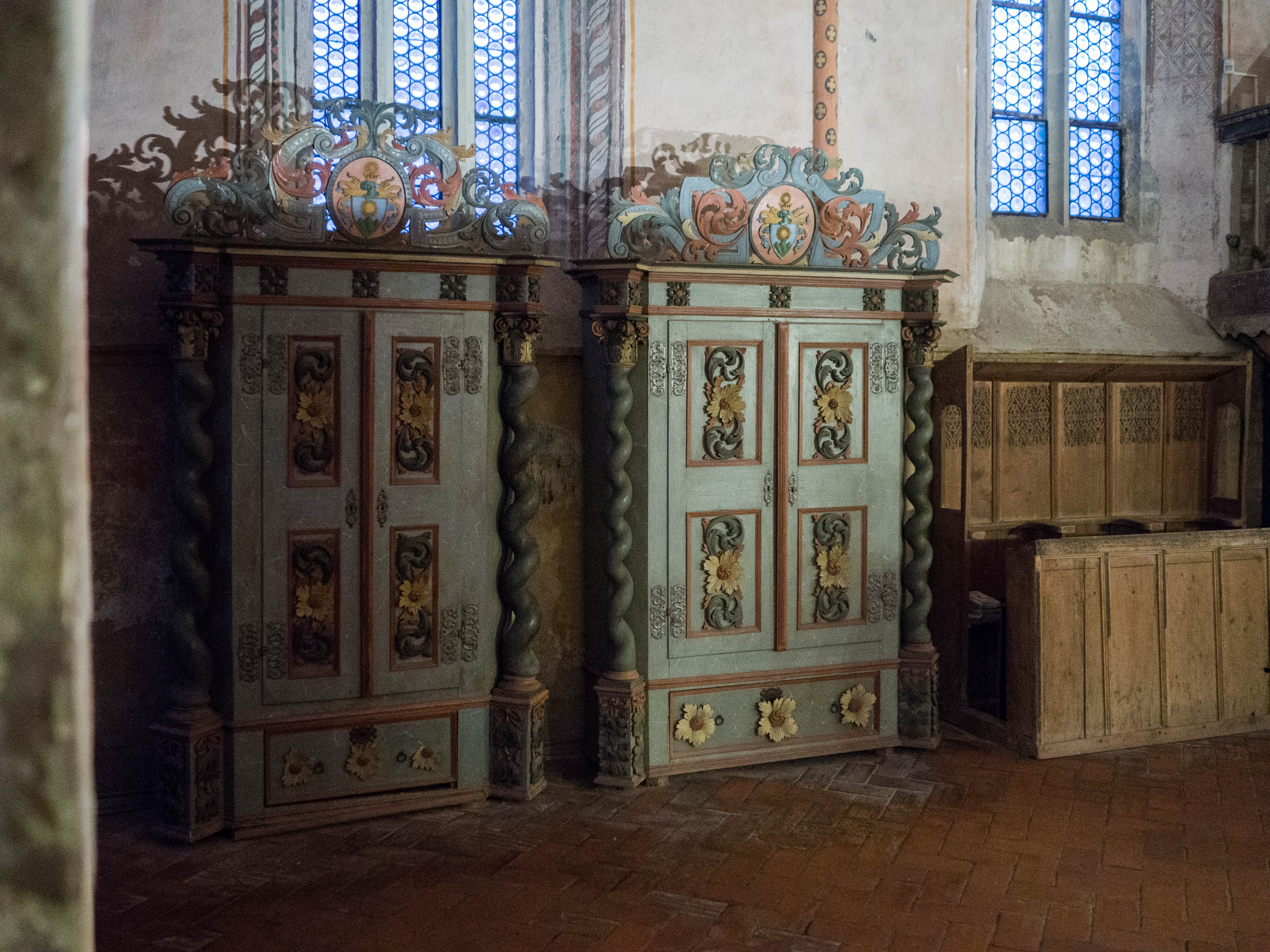
Unique furniture of the church

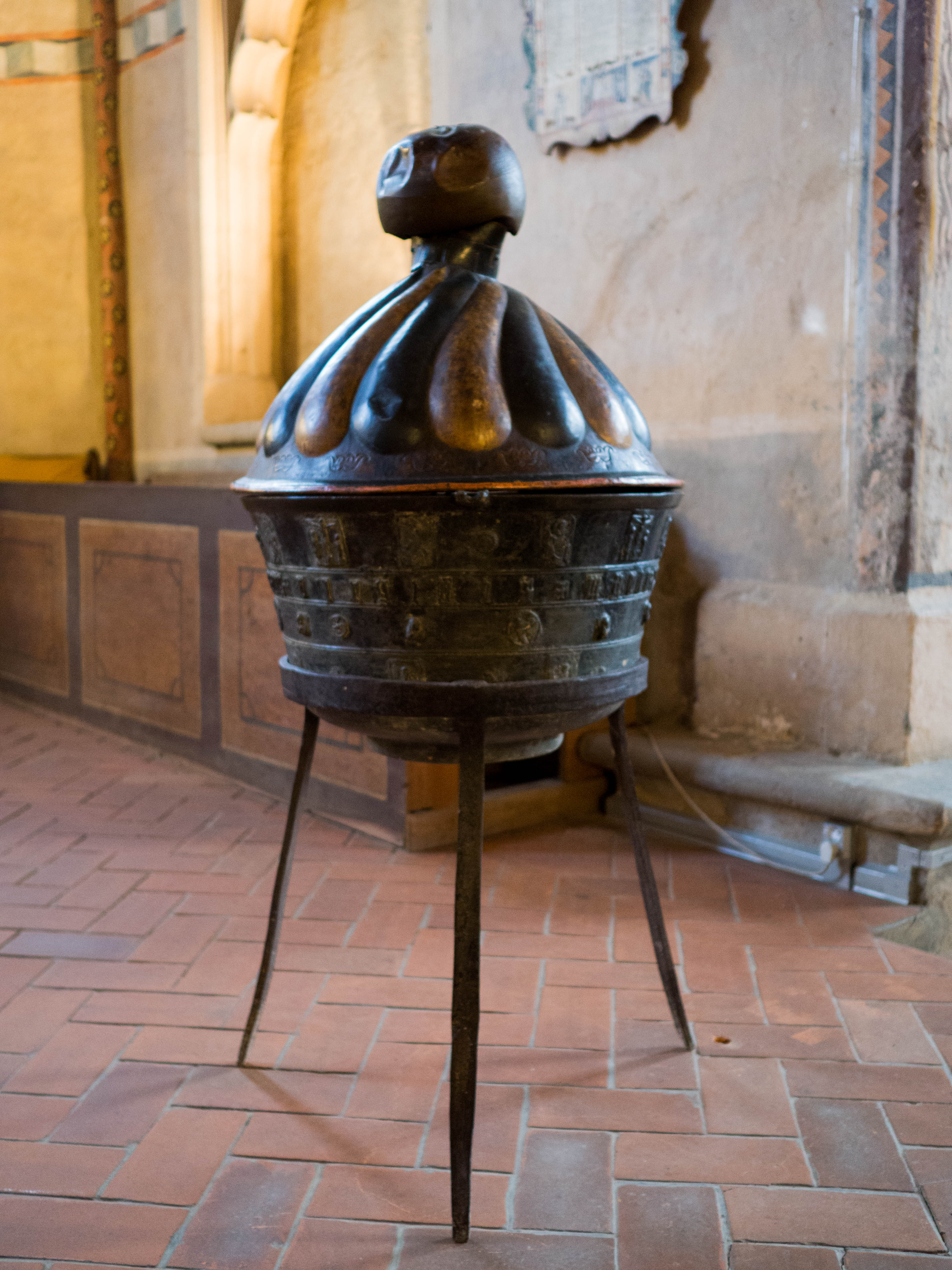
Baroque baptismal font

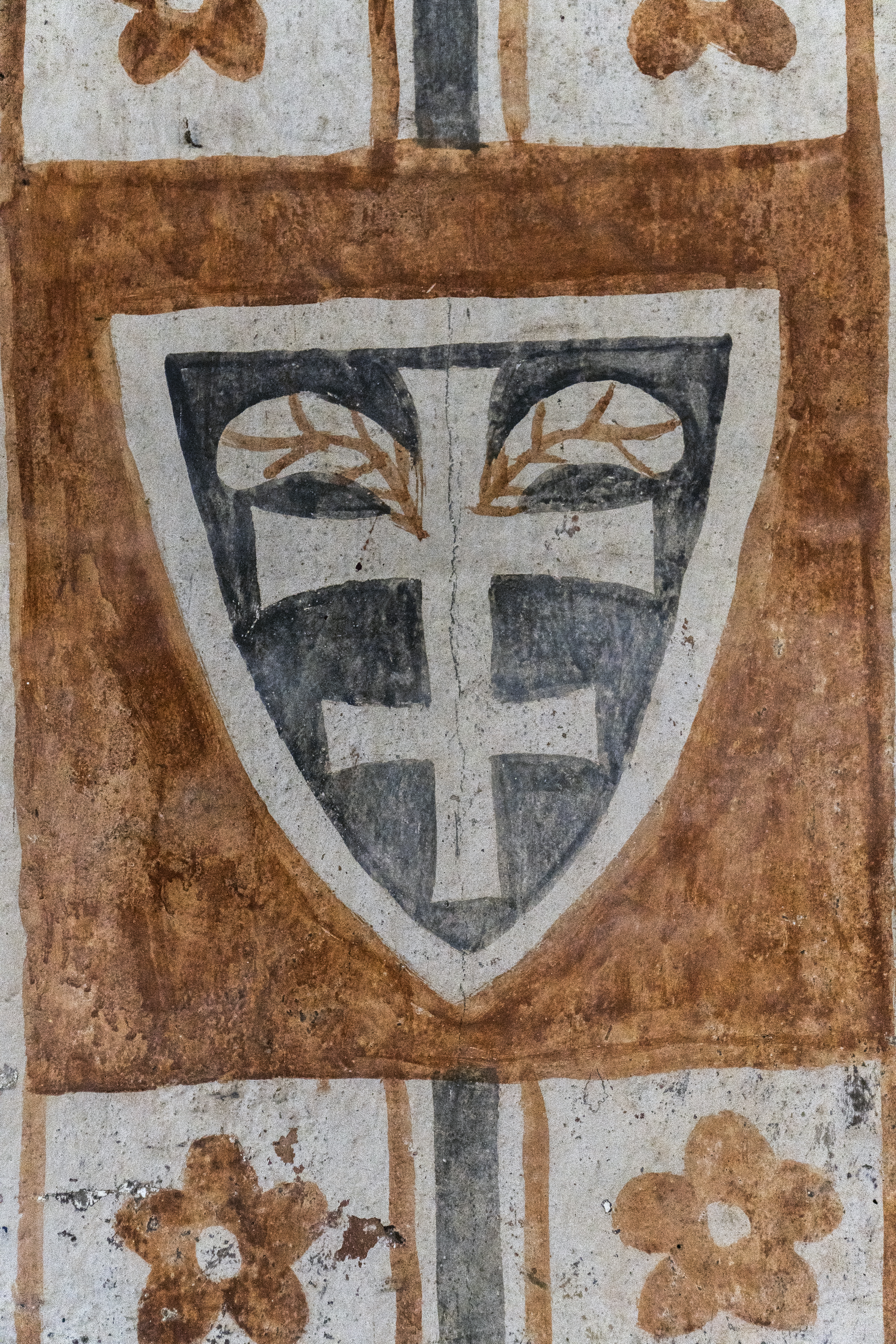
Coat of arms of Bebek family on gothic fresco

=== Roman Catholic Church of Saint Jude the Apostle ===
Baroque building with a segmental end of the presbytery and a tower was built in years 1749 to 1753. The church was built on behalf of Maria Theresa in a purely evangelical town. It underwent modifications in 1896. The facades of the church are divided by pilasters and semicircular windows with arches. The tower grows from the gable façade with niches, terminated by a crown ledge with and a bell-shaped shingled helmet with a lantern. A baroque plaque column was built next to the church.

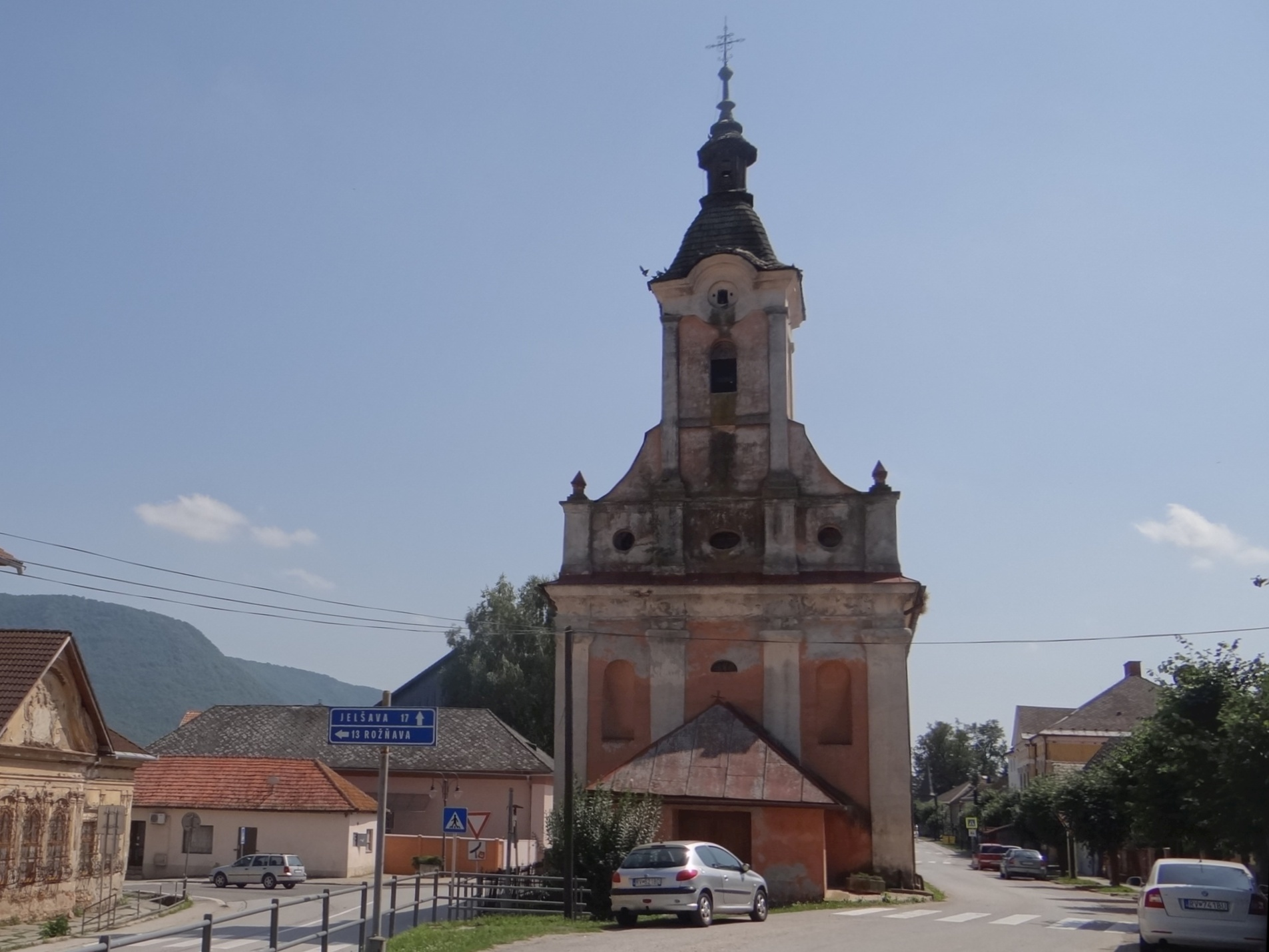
Roman Catholic Church of Saint Juda the Apostle

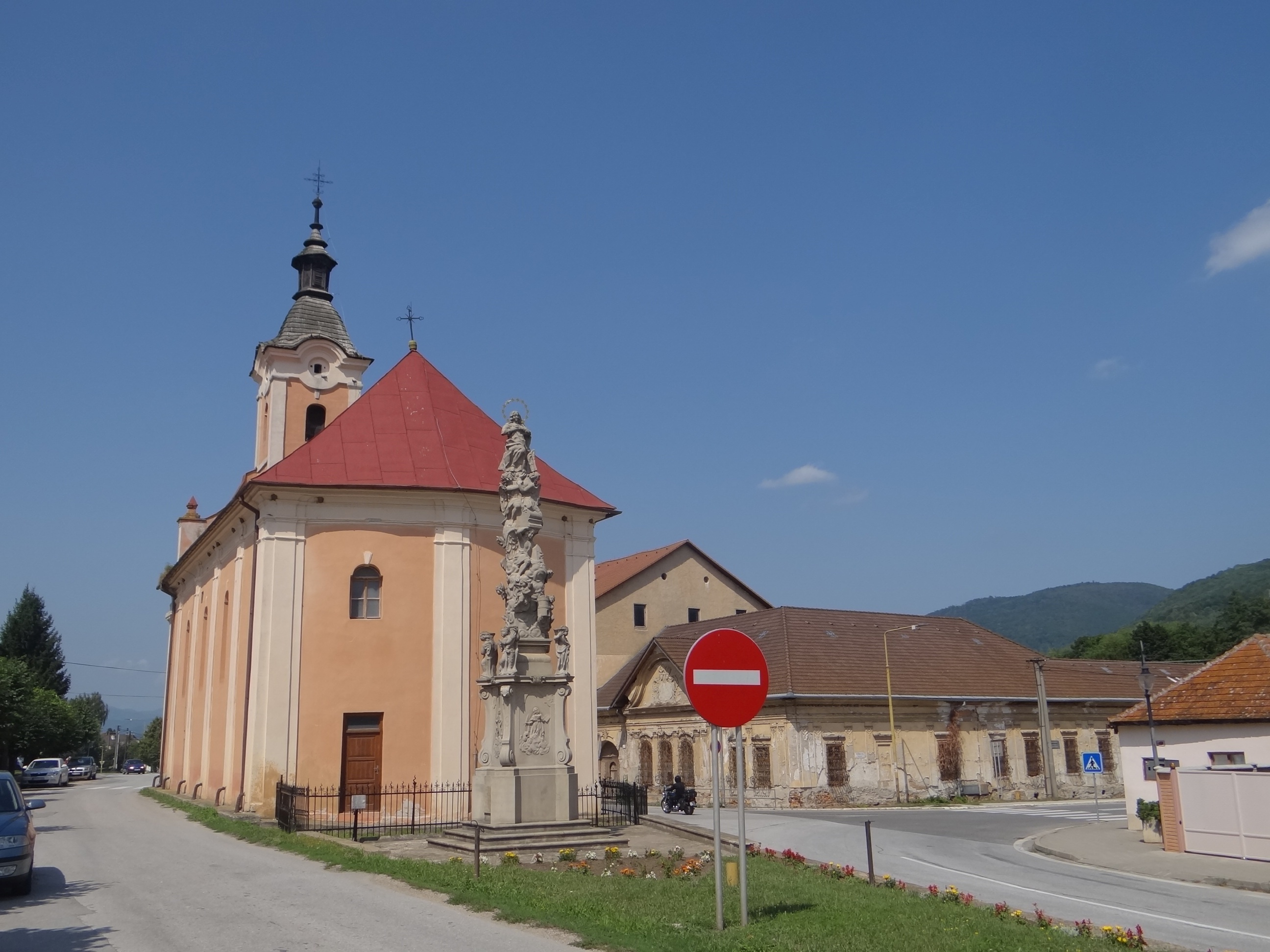
Roman Catholic Church of Saint Juda the Apostle

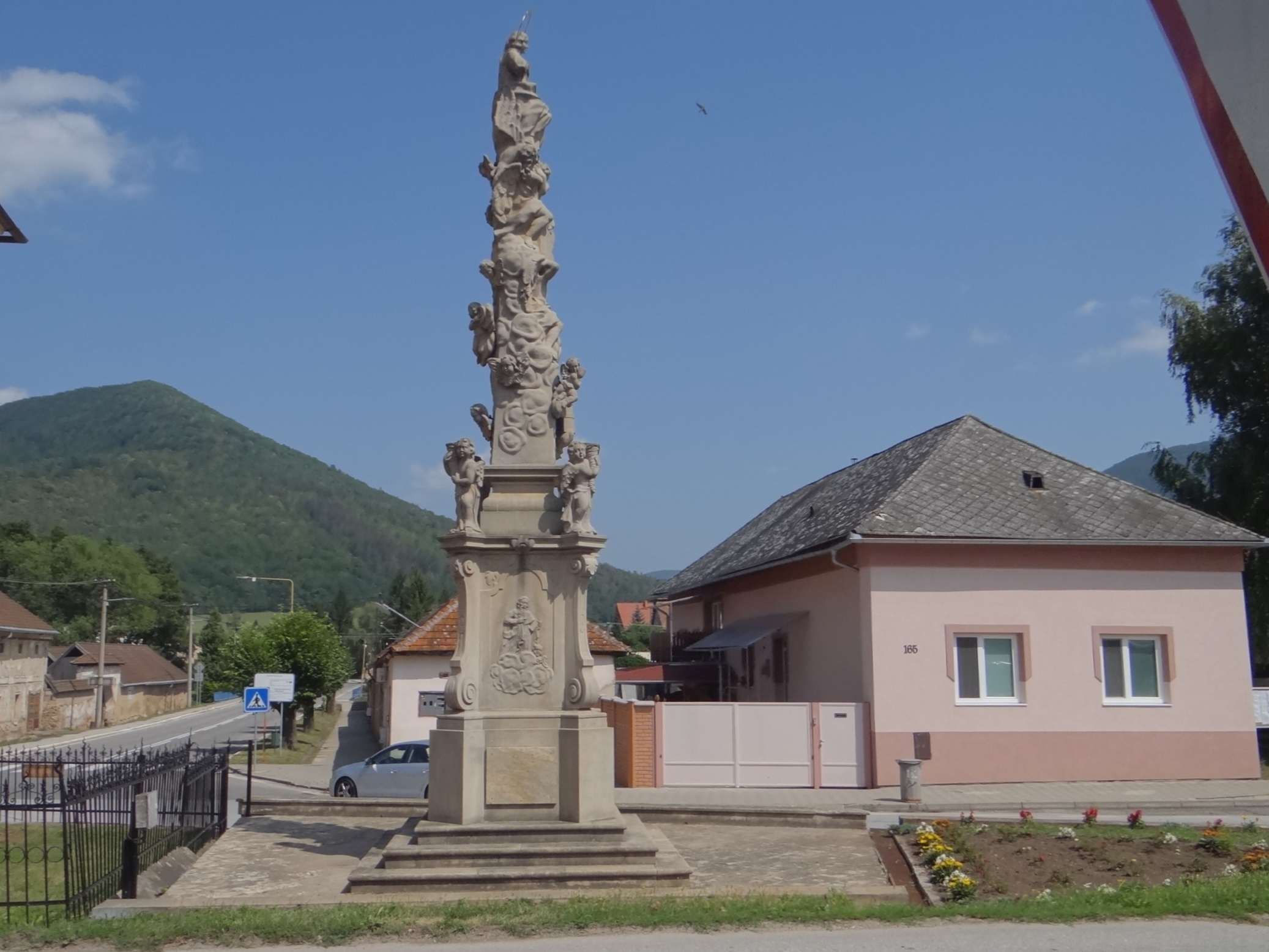
Baroque plaque column

=== Water Castle ===
Complex of medieval castle, from which two bastions of fortifications from the 16th century have been preserved. It was founded around 1432. The castle belonged to the family of Lords from Štítnik. At the beginning of the 19th century, a classicist manor house was built inside of area, a one-storey two-wing block building.

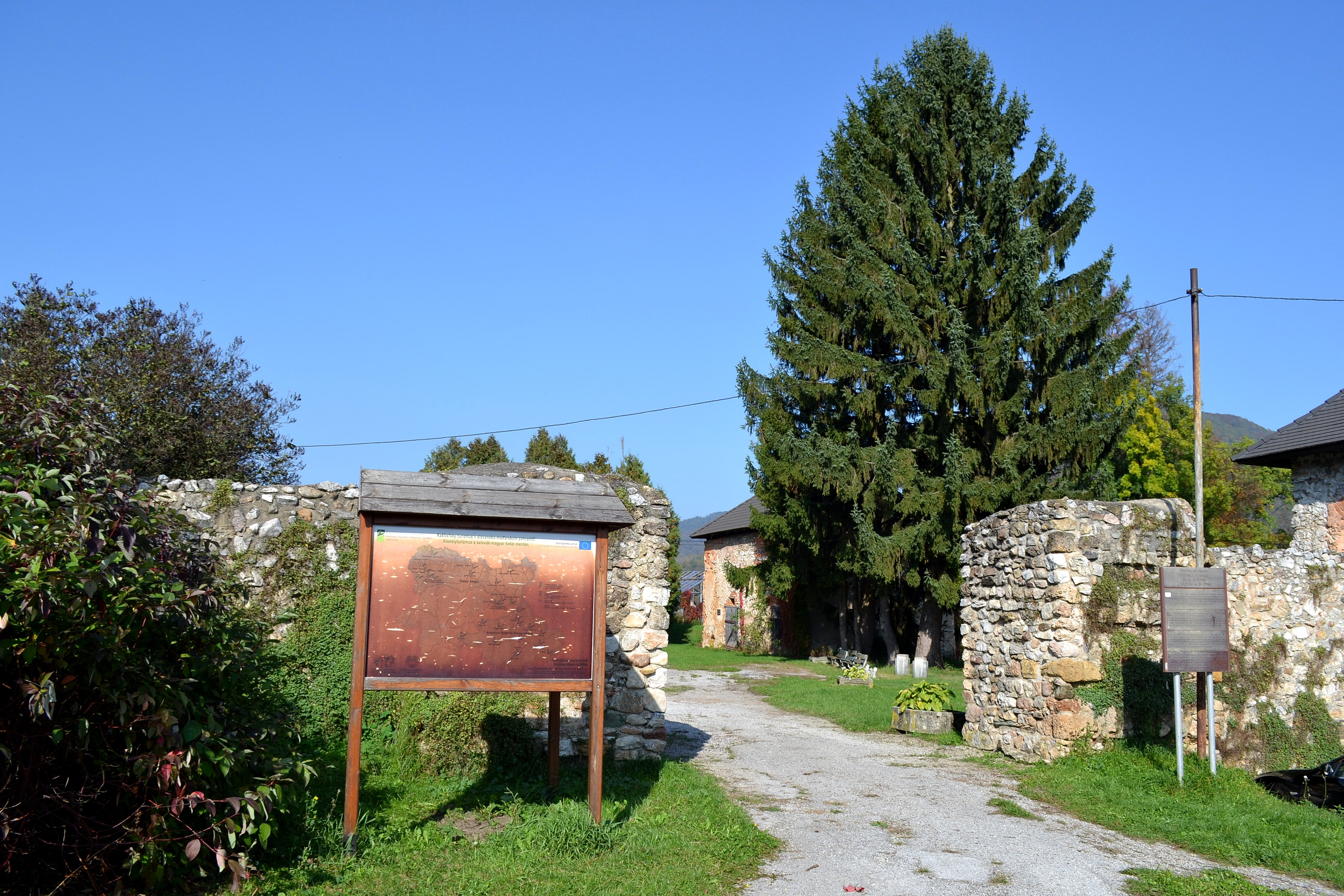
Entrance to the castle

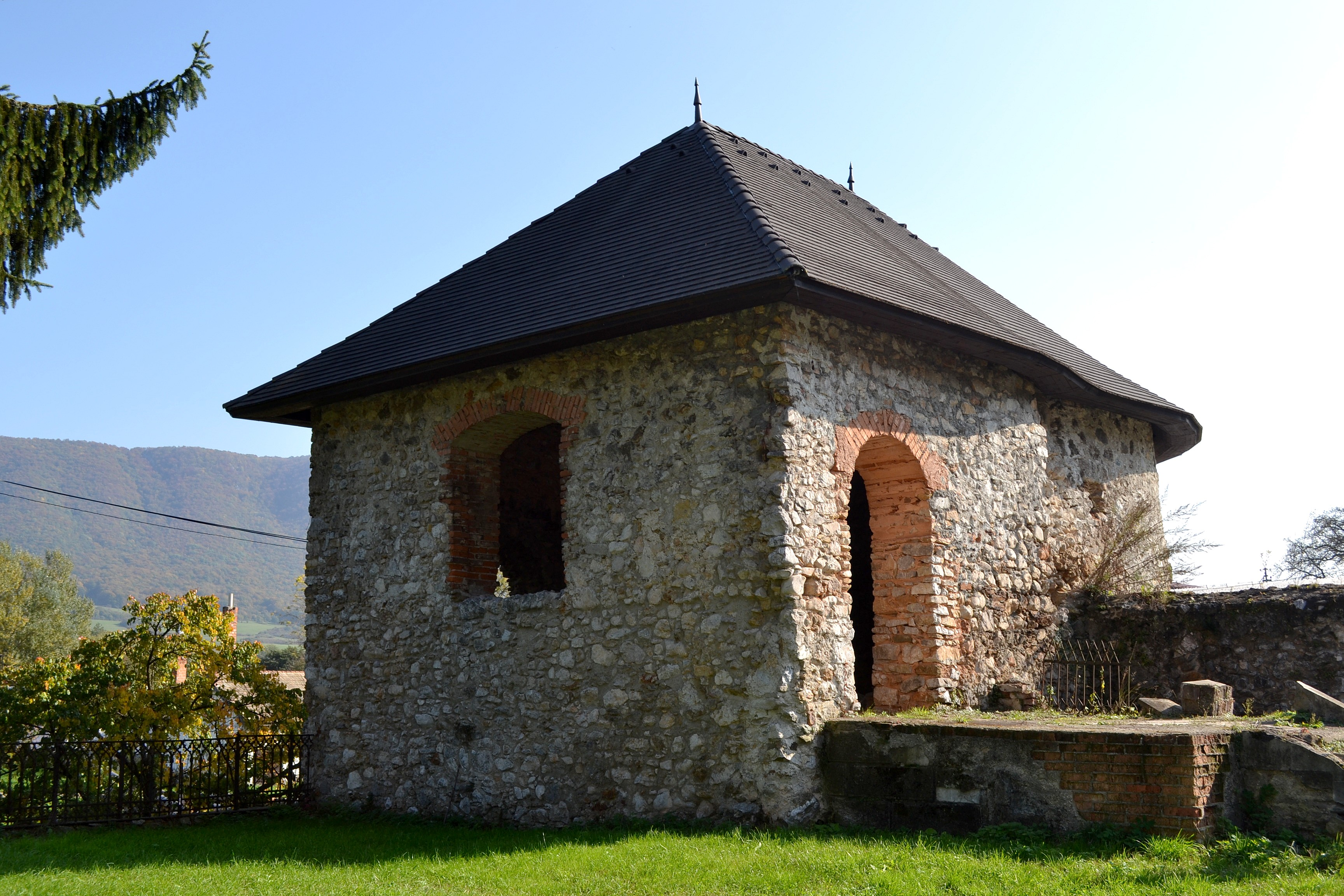
Preserved medieval part of water castle in Štítnik

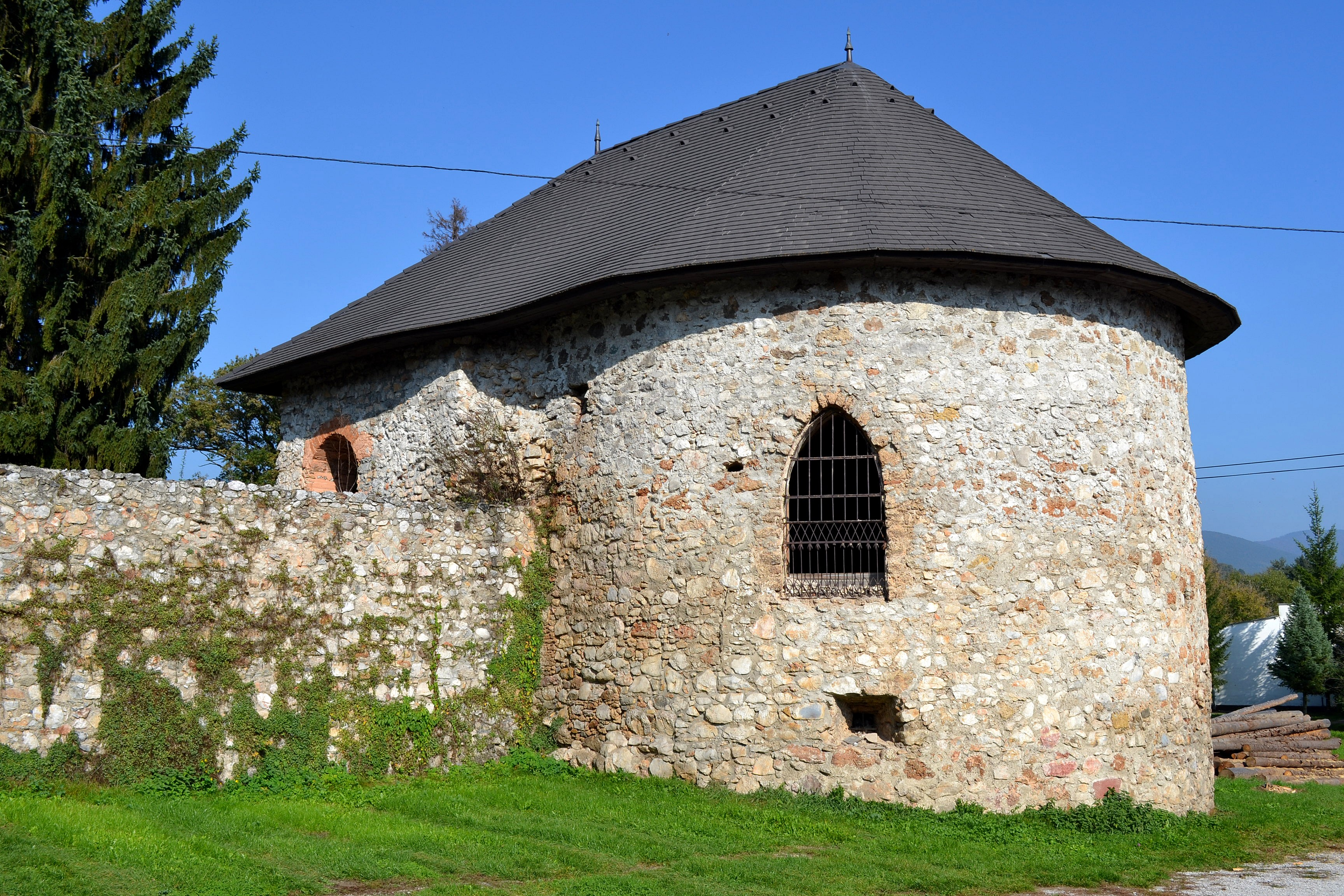
Preserved medieval part of water castle in Štítnik

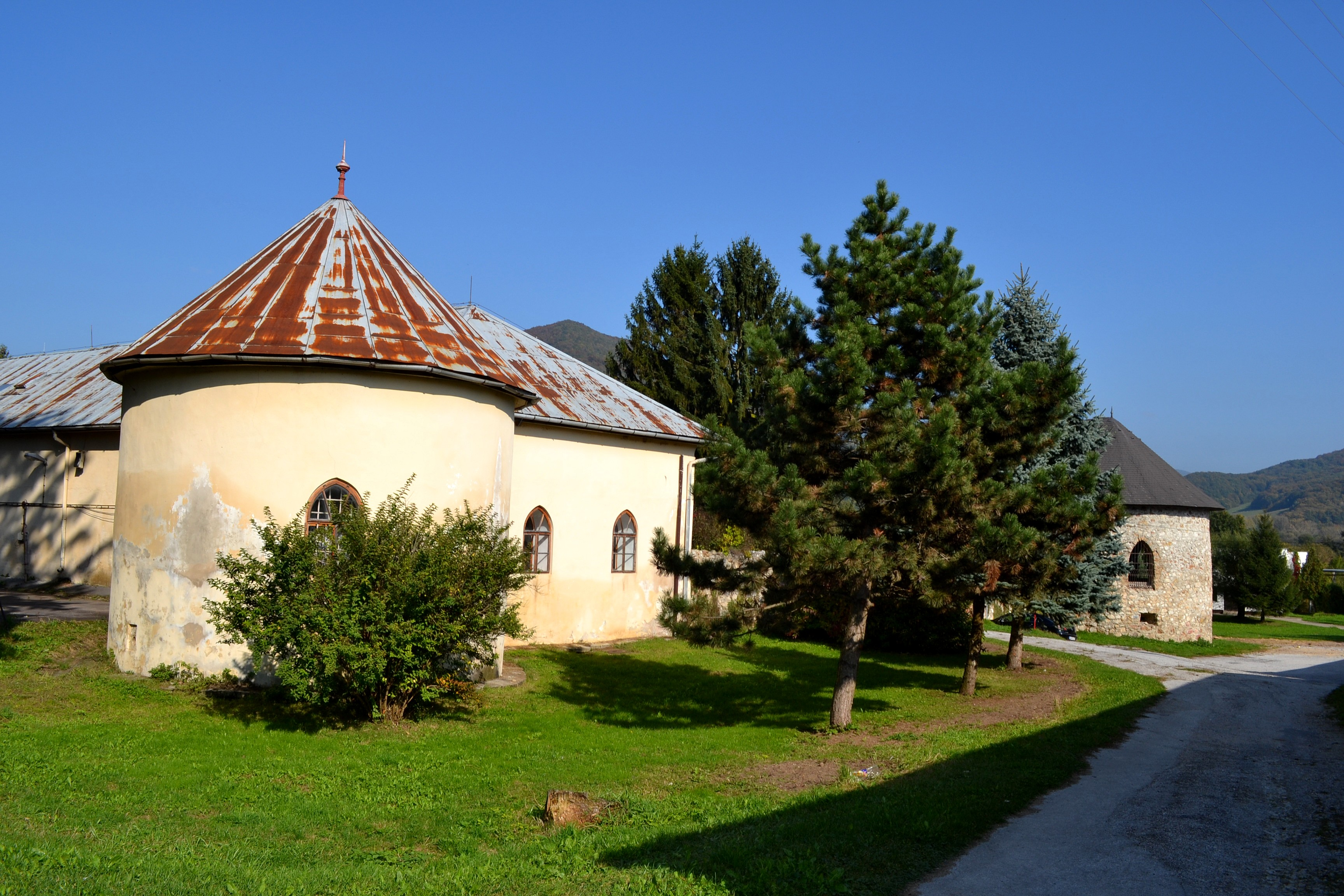
Mansion in the area of water castle in Štítnik

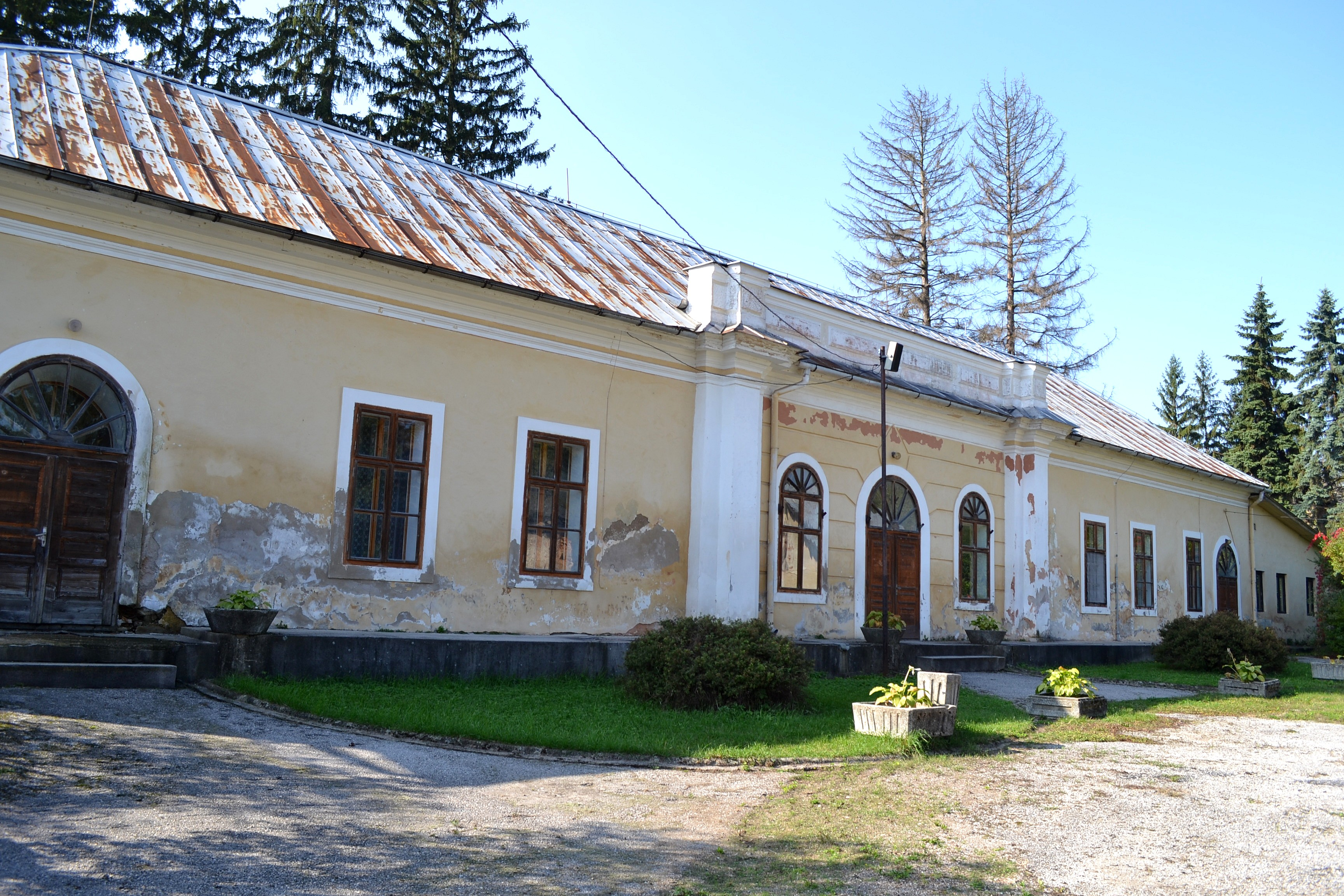
Mansion in the area of water castle in Štítnik

=== Other historical buildings ===
Several other historical buildings are preserved in village. These include renaissance town hall, rococo style Šebek's mansion and late baroque Sontág's mansion.

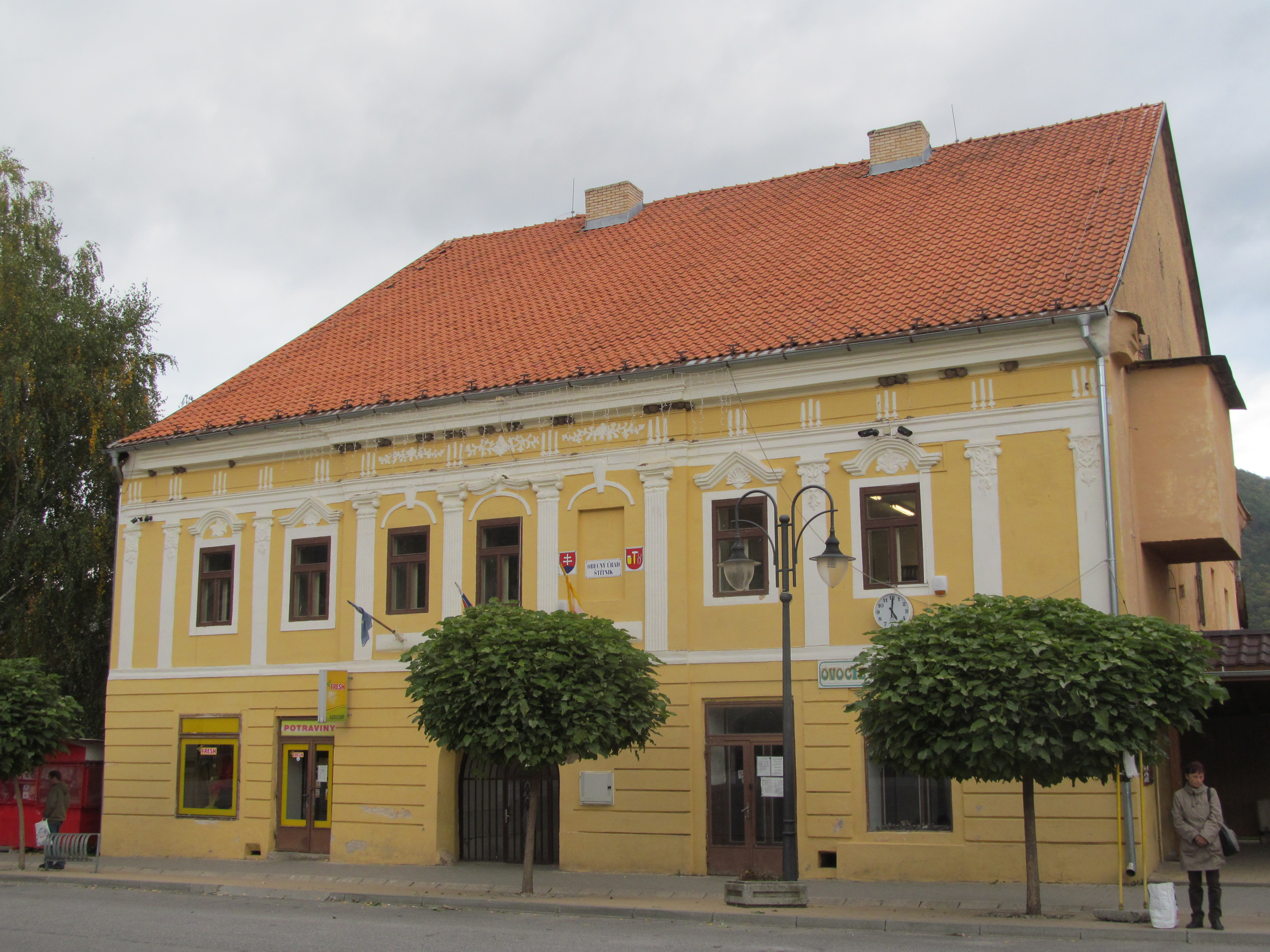
Renaissance town hall

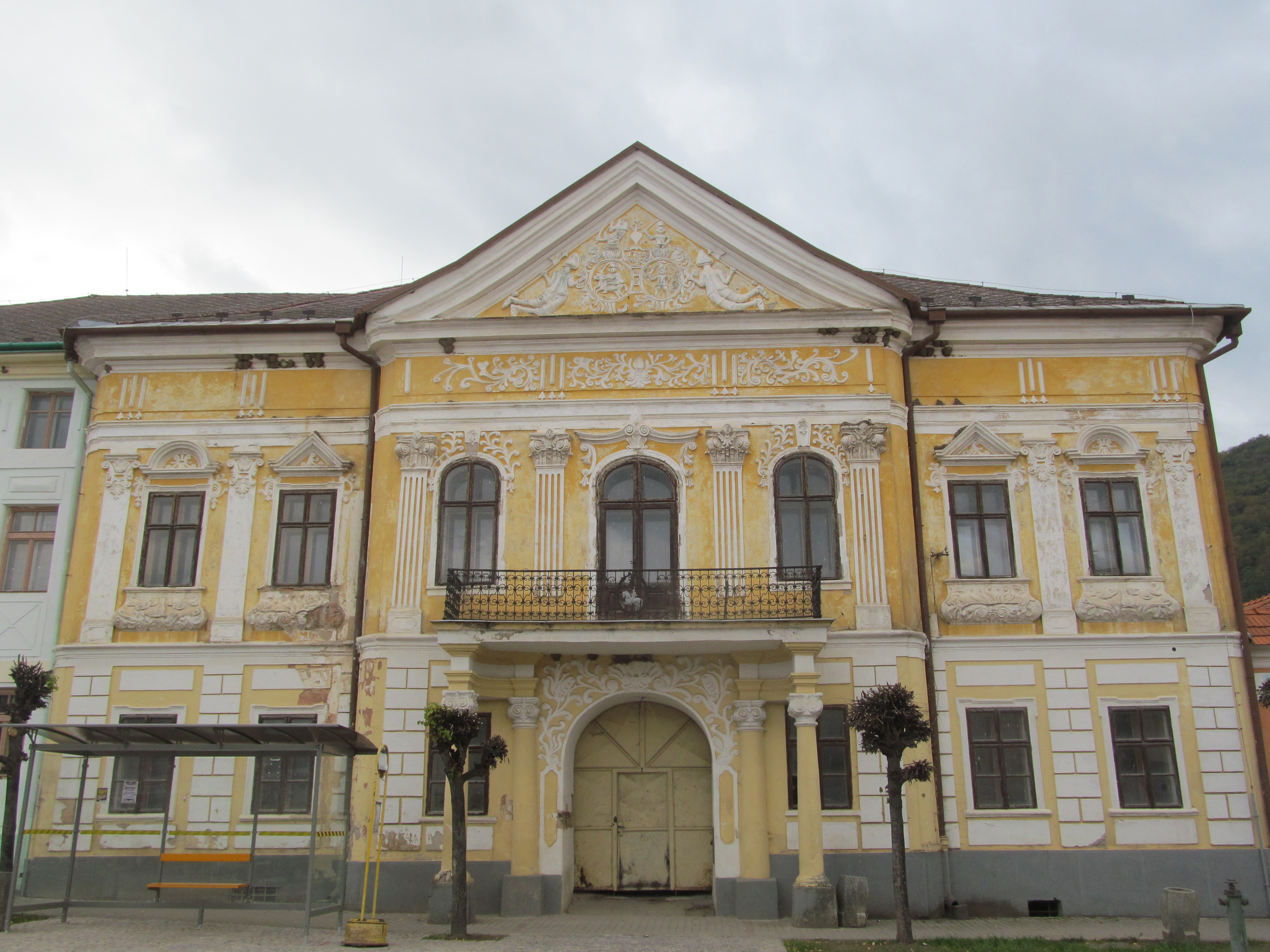
Late baroque Sontág's mansion

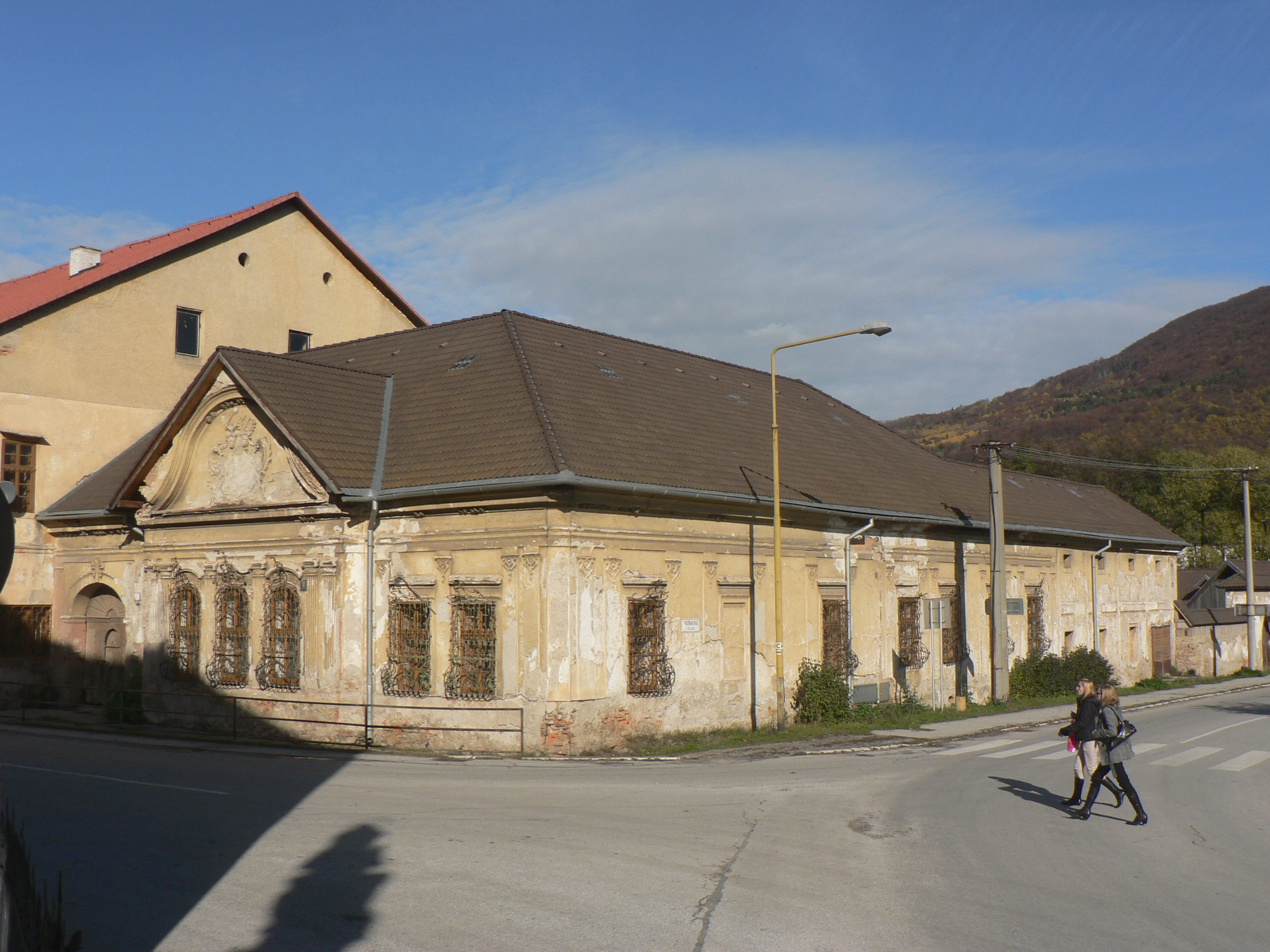
Rococo style Šebek's mansion

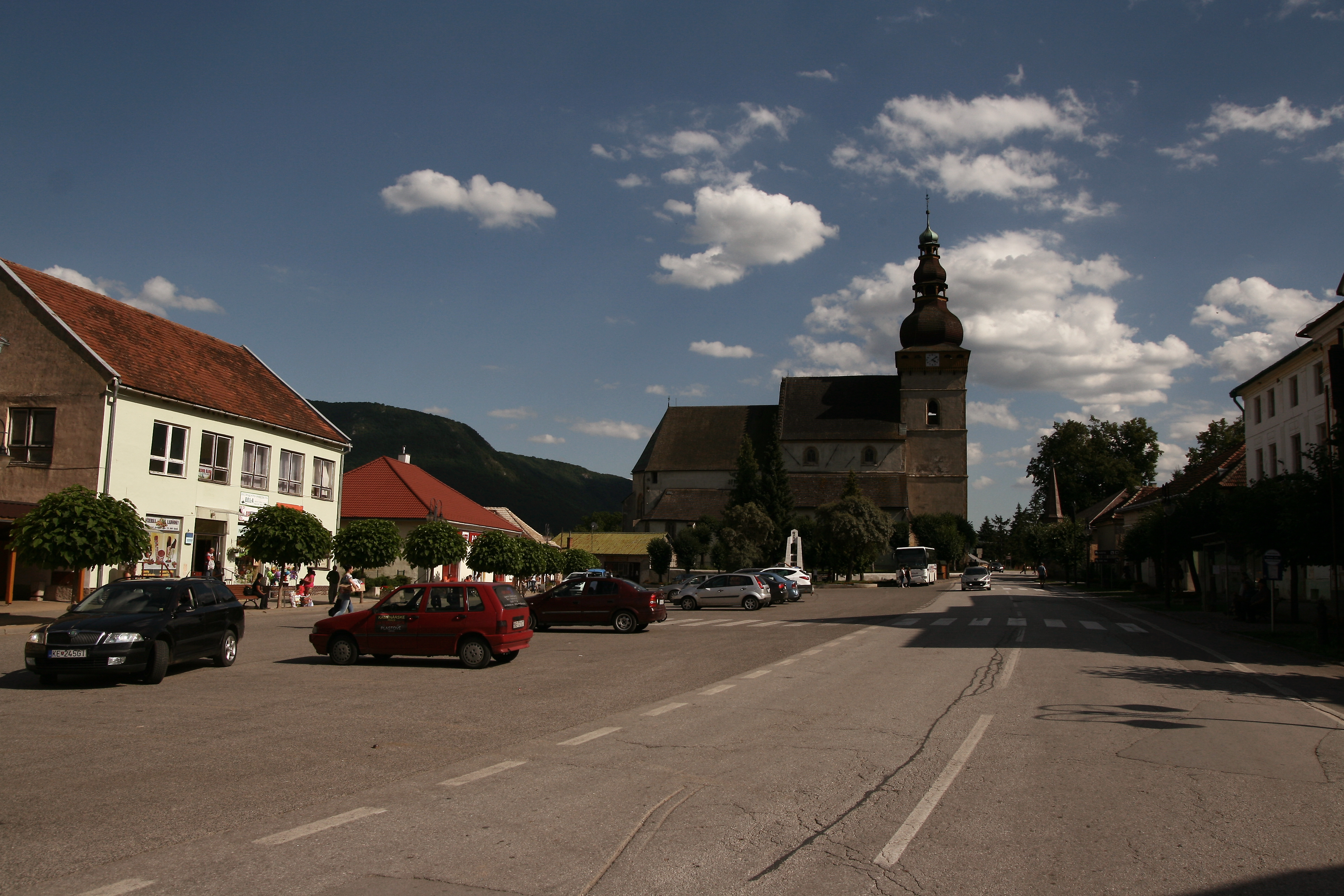
View of the square in the middle of village

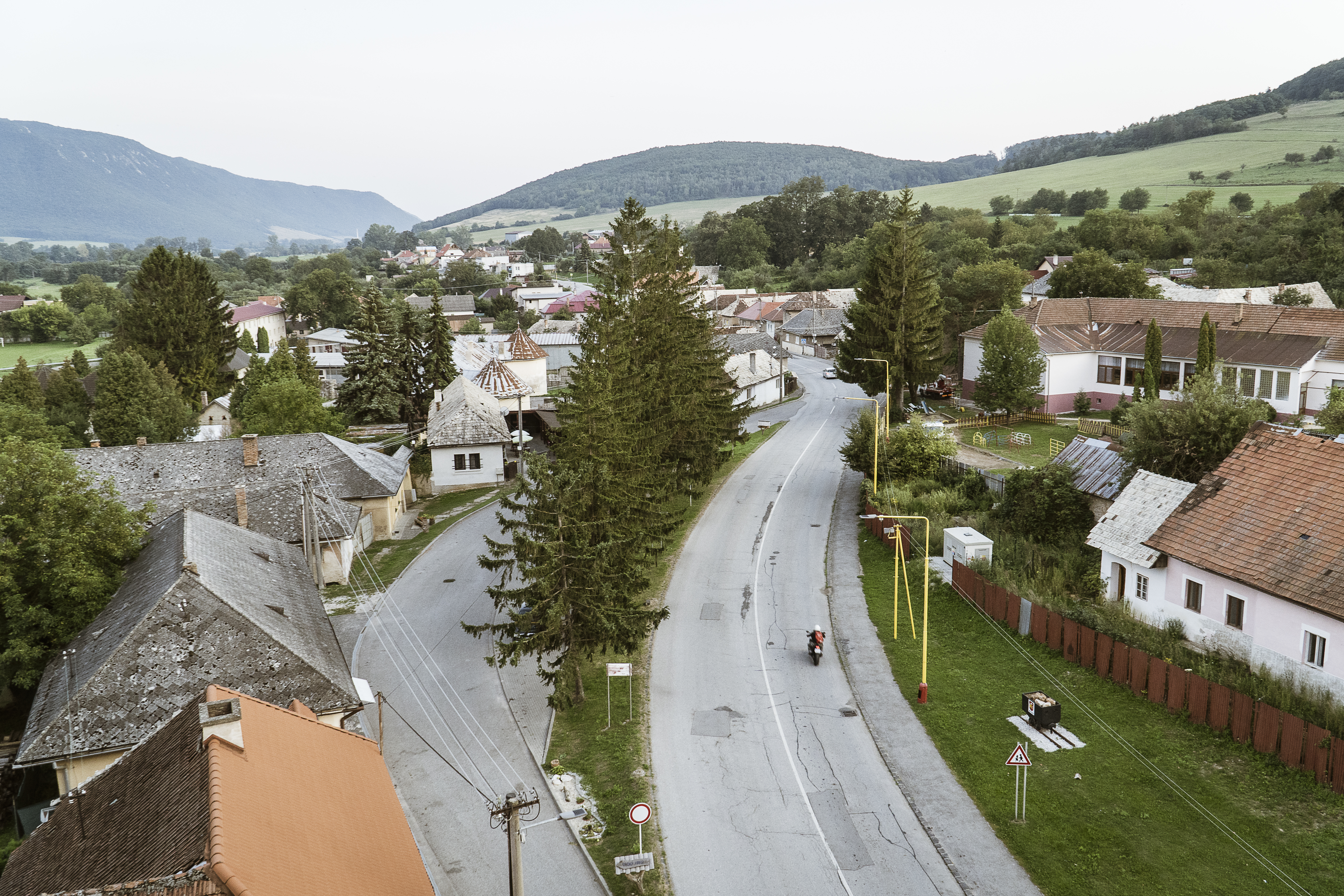
Overview of the southern part of village from the church tower
