= Kučín =

Kučín may refer to several places in Slovakia notably in the Prešov Region.

- Kučín, Bardejov District
- Kučín, Vranov nad Topľou District
