= Kučín, Bardejov District =

Village of Slovakia

Kučín
- Municipality
- Flag

- Location of Kučín in the Prešov Region Location of Kučín in Slovakia
- Coordinates: 49.21°N 21.46°E
- Country: Slovakia
- Region: Prešov Region
- District: Bardejov District
- First mentioned: 1335

Area
  - Total: 7.19 km^{2} (2.78 sq mi)
- Elevation: 207 m (679 ft)

Population (2025)
  - Total: 326
- Time zone: UTC+1 (CET)
  - Summer (DST): UTC+2 (CEST)
- Postal code: 861 2
- Area code: +421 54
- Vehicle registration plate (until 2022): BJ
- Website: www.kucin.eu

Kučín is a village and municipality in Bardejov District in the Prešov Region of north-east Slovakia.

== History ==
In historical records the village was first mentioned in 1335.

== Geography ==
The municipality lies at an altitude of 207 metres (679 ft) and covers an area of 7.19 km^{2} (2.78 sq mi) (2025).

== Population ==
Population statistic (10 years)
Year	1995	2005	2015	2025
Count	326	321	324	326
Difference		−1.53%	+0.93%	+0.61%

Population statistic
Year	2024	2025
Count	327	326
Difference		−0.30%

It has a population of 326 people (31 December 2025).

=== Ethnicity ===
Census 2021 (1+ %)
Ethnicity	Number	Fraction
Slovak	315	97.52%
Not found out	4	1.23%
Total	323	

In year 2021 was 323 people by ethnicity 315 as Slovak, 4 as Not found out, 3 as Czech, 3 as Italian and 3 as Rusyn.

Note on population: The difference values of population numbers in the table "Population statistic" and in the sections "Ethnicity" & "Religion" is caused by the use of various statistical methods.

=== Religion ===
Census 2021 (1+ %)
Religion	Number	Fraction
Roman Catholic Church	288	89.16%
Greek Catholic Church	10	3.1%
Evangelical Church	10	3.1%
None	10	3.1%
Not found out	5	1.55%
Total	323	

In year 2021 was 323 people by religion 288 from Roman Catholic Church, 10 from Greek Catholic Church, 10 from Evangelical Church, 10 from None and 5 from Not found out.
