= Kučín, Vranov nad Topľou District =

Kučín
- Municipality
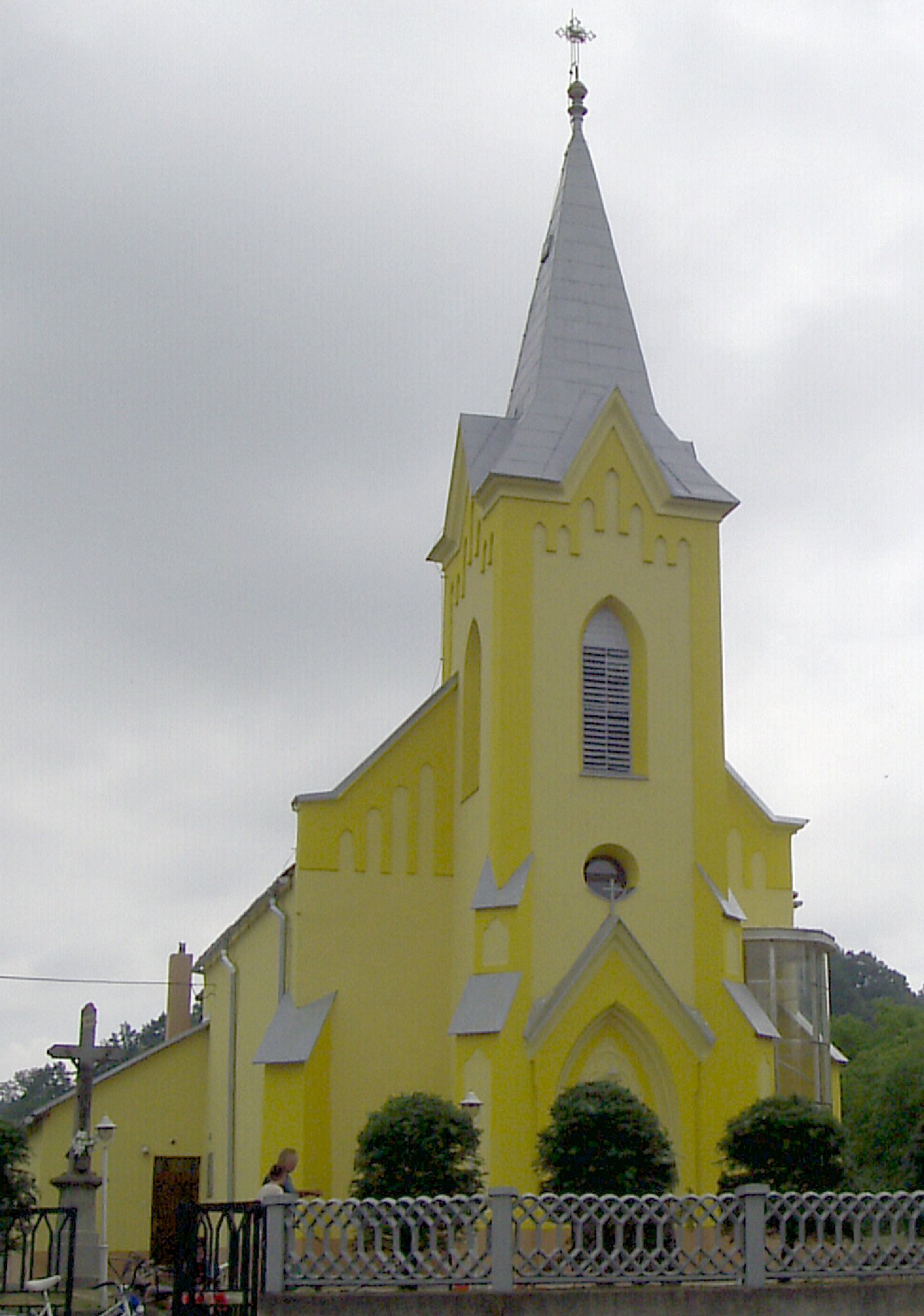

- Flag

- Location of Kučín in the Prešov Region Location of Kučín in Slovakia
- Coordinates: 48°52′09″N 21°44′48″E
- Country: Slovakia
- Region: Prešov Region
- District: Vranov nad Topľou District
- First mentioned: 1335

Area
  - Total: 3.97 km^{2} (1.53 sq mi)
- Elevation: 127 m (417 ft)

Population (2025)
  - Total: 523
- Time zone: UTC+1 (CET)
  - Summer (DST): UTC+2 (CEST)
- Postal code: 942 1
- Area code: +421 57
- Vehicle registration plate (until 2022): VT
- Website: www.obeckucin.sk

Kučín (Hungarian: Alsóköcsény, until 1899: Kucsin) is a village and municipality in Vranov nad Topľou District in the Prešov Region of eastern Slovakia.

== Population ==
Population statistic (10 years)
Year	1995	2005	2015	2025
Count	400	502	527	523
Difference		+25.5%	+4.98%	−0.75%

Population statistic
Year	2024	2025
Count	536	523
Difference		−2.42%

It has a population of 523 people (31 December 2025).

=== Ethnicity ===
Census 2021 (1+ %)
Ethnicity	Number	Fraction
Slovak	513	92.26%
Romani	34	6.11%
Not found out	19	3.41%
Total	556	

In year 2021 was 556 people by ethnicity 513 as Slovak, 34 as Romani, 19 as Not found out, 3 as Other, 2 as Ukrainian, 2 as Rusyn, 2 as Hungarian and 1 as Russian.

Note on population: The difference values of population numbers in the table "Population statistic" and in the sections "Ethnicity" & "Religion" is caused by the use of various statistical methods.

=== Religion ===
Census 2021 (1+ %)
Religion	Number	Fraction
Roman Catholic Church	332	59.71%
Greek Catholic Church	76	13.67%
None	75	13.49%
Evangelical Church	37	6.65%
Not found out	18	3.24%
Jehovah's Witnesses	12	2.16%
Total	556	

In year 2021 was 556 people by religion 332 from Roman Catholic Church, 76 from Greek Catholic Church, 75 from None, 37 from Evangelical Church, 18 from Not found out, 12 from Jehovah's Witnesses, 3 from Eastern Orthodox Church, 1 from Old Catholic Church, 1 from Calvinist Church and 1 from Other and not ascertained christian church.
