= Štefanovce =

Štefanovce may refer to several places in Slovakia notably in the Prešov Region.

- Štefanovce, Prešov District
- Štefanovce, Vranov nad Topľou District
