= Štefanovce, Prešov District =

Štefanovce
- Municipality
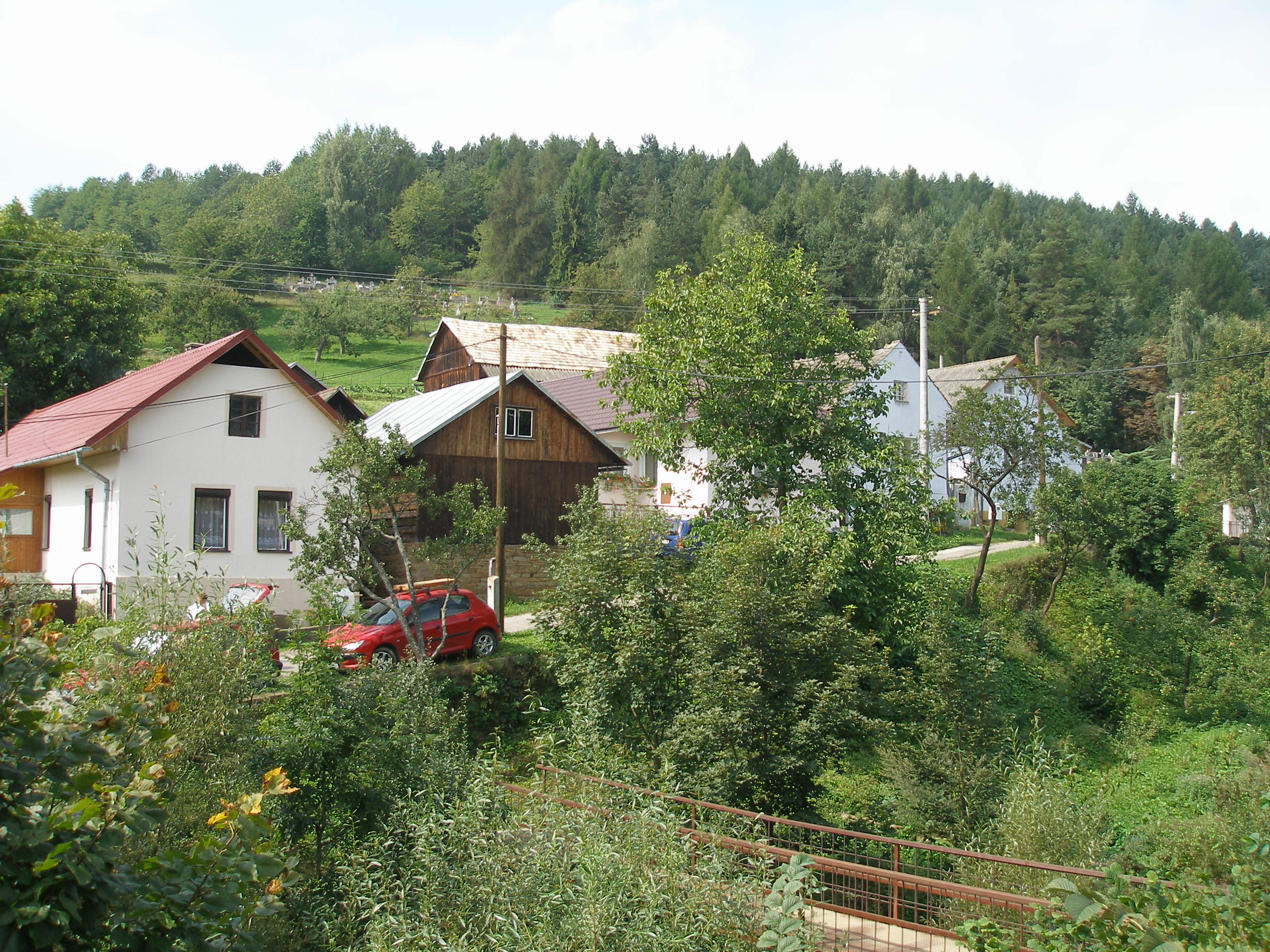

- Flag

- Location of Štefanovce in the Prešov Region Location of Štefanovce in Slovakia
- Coordinates: 49.04°N 20.97°E
- Country: Slovakia
- Region: Prešov Region
- District: Prešov District
- First mentioned: 1331

Area
  - Total: 5.25 km^{2} (2.03 sq mi)
- Elevation: 548 m (1,798 ft)

Population (2025)
  - Total: 202
- Time zone: UTC+1 (CET)
  - Summer (DST): UTC+2 (CEST)
- Postal code: 823 5
- Area code: +421 51
- Vehicle registration plate (until 2022): PO
- Website: www.stefanovce.sk

Štefanovce (Hungarian: Istvánvágás) is a village and municipality in Prešov District in the Prešov Region of eastern Slovakia.

== Population ==
Population statistic (10 years)
Year	1995	2005	2015	2025
Count	195	228	218	202
Difference		+16.92%	−4.38%	−7.33%

Population statistic
Year	2024	2025
Count	207	202
Difference		−2.41%

It has a population of 202 people (31 December 2025).

=== Ethnicity ===
Census 2021 (1+ %)
Ethnicity	Number	Fraction
Slovak	199	100%
Total	199	

In year 2021 was 199 people by ethnicity 199 as Slovak.

Note on population: The difference values of population numbers in the table "Population statistic" and in the sections "Ethnicity" & "Religion" is caused by the use of various statistical methods.

=== Religion ===
Census 2021 (1+ %)
Religion	Number	Fraction
Roman Catholic Church	197	98.99%
Total	199	

In year 2021 was 199 people by religion 197 from Roman Catholic Church, 1 from Christian Congregations in Slovakia and 1 from Greek Catholic Church.
