= Štefanovce, Vranov nad Topľou District =

Štefanovce
- Municipality
- Flag

- Location of Štefanovce in the Prešov Region Location of Štefanovce in Slovakia
- Coordinates: 48°57′36″N 21°46′26″E
- Country: Slovakia
- Region: Prešov Region
- District: Vranov nad Topľou District
- First mentioned: 1473

Area
  - Total: 8.92 km^{2} (3.44 sq mi)
- Elevation: 199 m (653 ft)

Population (2025)
  - Total: 89
- Time zone: UTC+1 (CET)
  - Summer (DST): UTC+2 (CEST)
- Postal code: 940 1
- Area code: +421 57
- Vehicle registration plate (until 2022): VT
- Website: stefanovce.eu

Štefanovce (Hungarian: Istvántelke, until 1899: Stefanócz) is a village and municipality in Vranov nad Topľou District in the Prešov Region of eastern Slovakia.

== History ==
In historical records, the village was first mentioned in 1473. Mayor of the city Jozef Hobľák.

== Geography ==
The municipality lies at an altitude of 199 metres (653 ft) and covers an area of 8.92 km^{2} (3.44 sq mi) (2025).

== Population ==
Population statistic (10 years)
Year	1995	2005	2015	2025
Count	105	109	118	89
Difference		+3.80%	+8.25%	−24.57%

Population statistic
Year	2024	2025
Count	86	89
Difference		+3.48%

It has a population of 89 people (31 December 2025).

=== Ethnicity ===
Census 2021 (1+ %)
Ethnicity	Number	Fraction
Slovak	103	96.26%
Not found out	3	2.8%
Czech	2	1.86%
Total	107	

In year 2021 was 107 people by ethnicity 103 as Slovak, 3 as Not found out and 2 as Czech.

Note on population: The difference values of population numbers in the table "Population statistic" and in the sections "Ethnicity" & "Religion" is caused by the use of various statistical methods.

=== Religion ===
Census 2021 (1+ %)
Religion	Number	Fraction
Roman Catholic Church	51	47.66%
Greek Catholic Church	46	42.99%
Not found out	7	6.54%
None	2	1.87%
Total	107	

In year 2021 was 107 people by religion 51 from Roman Catholic Church, 46 from Greek Catholic Church, 7 from Not found out, 2 from None and 1 from Eastern Orthodox Church.
