= Prešov =

City in Slovakia

- City
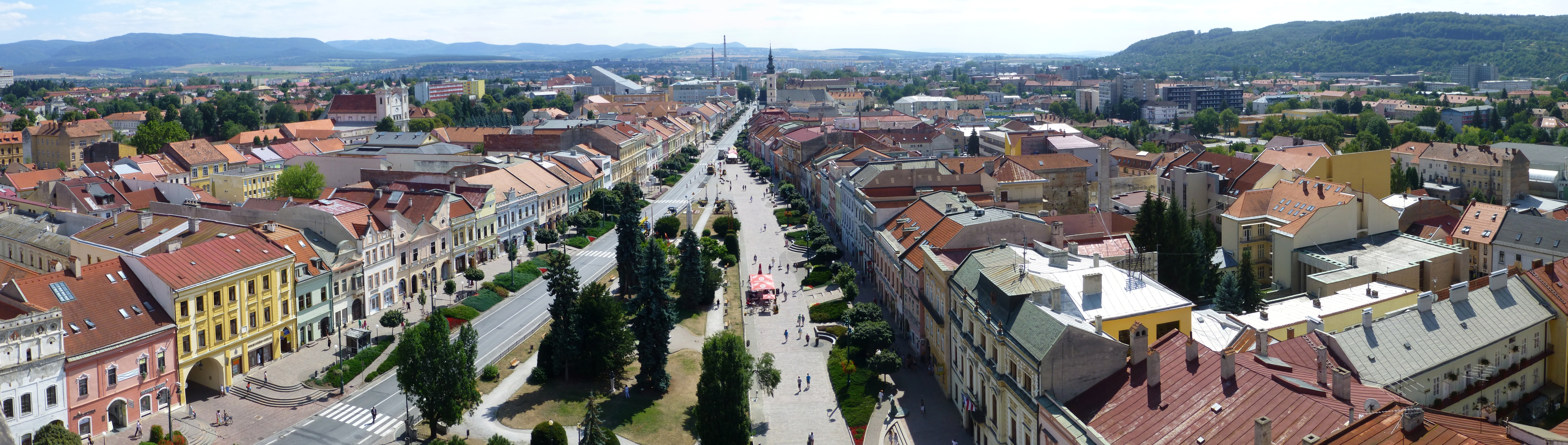
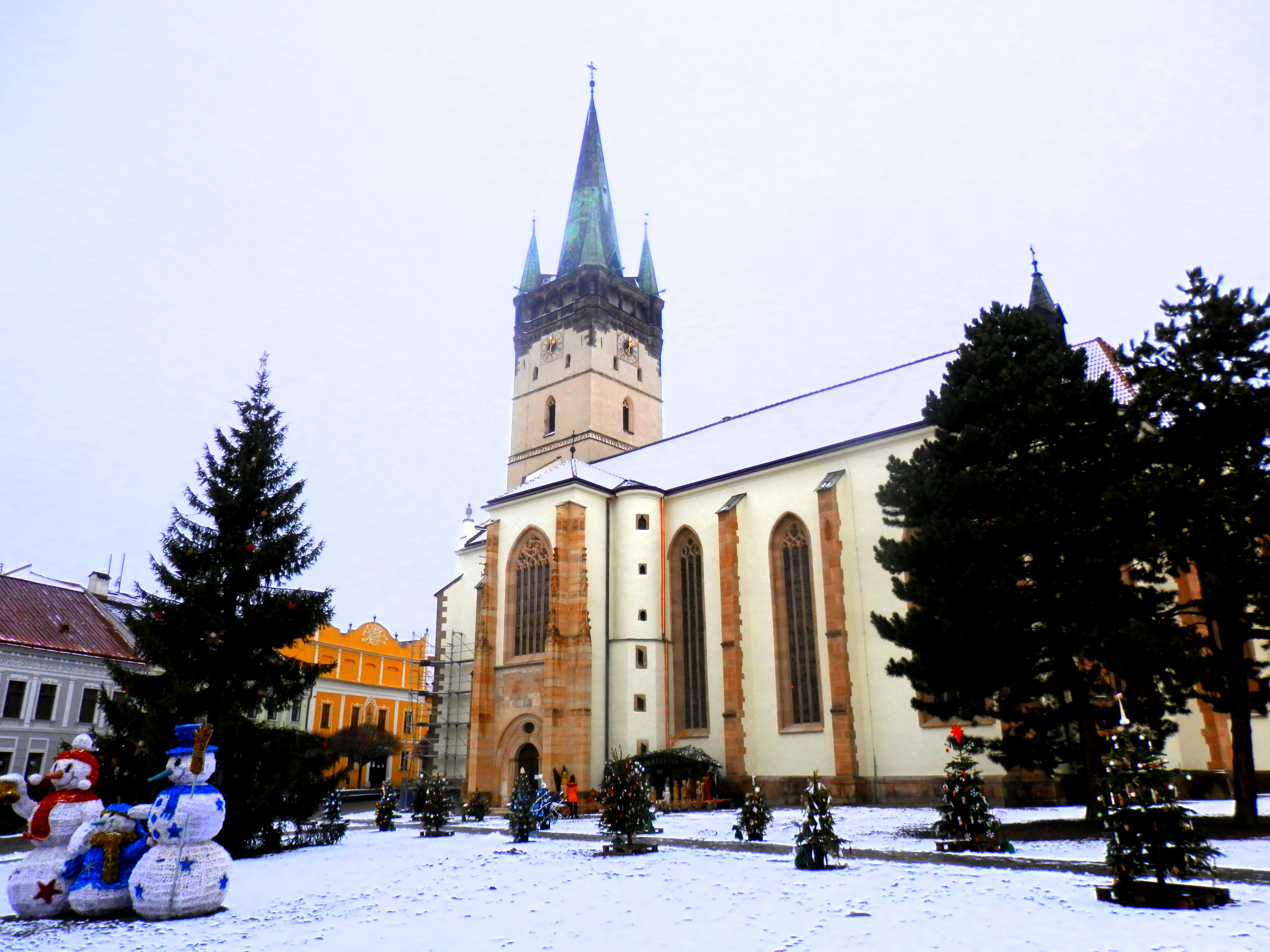
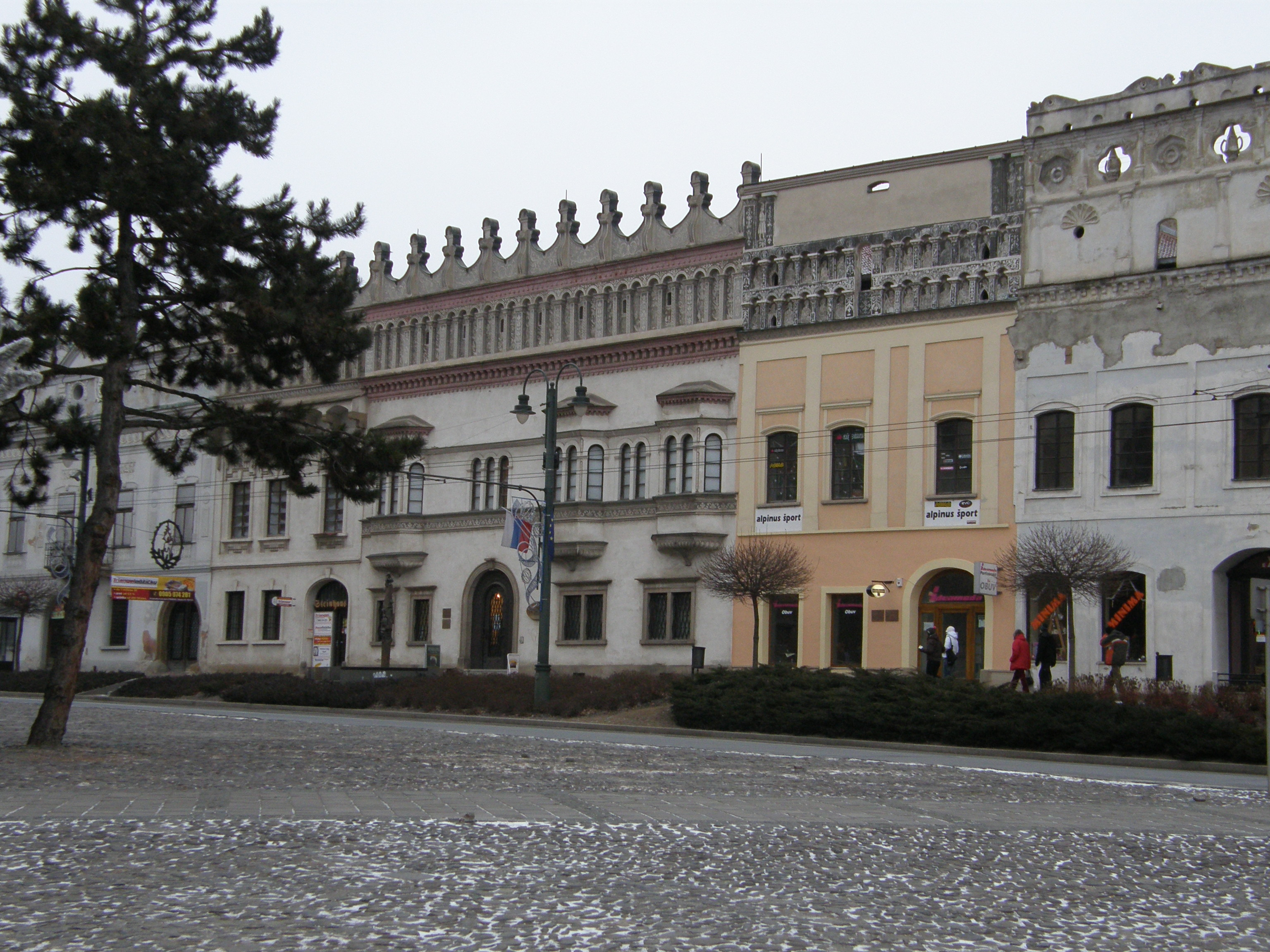
- View over Central Prešov (2015) Co-Cathedral of Saint Nicholas Rakóczi's Palace

- Flag Coat of arms
- Nicknames: PO, (Note: Derived from the historical car plate of the Prešov District.) PO City, (Note: also POCITY, PO derived from the historical car plate of the Prešov District, pocity also means "feelings" in Slovak.) Atény nad Torysou (Athens above Torysa), Slovenský Seattle (Slovak Seattle), (Note: For more info and sources, see the Music section.) Mesto hudby (City of Music), Preshow (Note: Reference to the fact that many people in Slovak show business are from Prešov. Pre means "for" in Slovak, so Pre show = For show.)
- Location in Slovakia Prešov (Slovakia)
- Coordinates: 49°00′06″N 21°14′22″E
- Country: Slovakia
- Region: Prešov
- District: Prešov
- First mentioned: 1247

Government
  - Mayor: Ing. František Oľha (Democrats)

Area
  - City: 71.09 km^{2} (27.45 sq mi)
- (2022)
- Elevation: 296 m (971 ft)

Population (2025)
  - City: 81,223
  - Urban: 110,978
- Demonym(s): Prešovčan (m.); Prešovčanka (f.) (sk)
- Time zone: UTC+1 (CET)
  - Summer (DST): UTC+2 (CEST)
- Postal code: 080 01
- Area code: +421 51
- Historical car plate: PO, PV, PS (Note: The Prešov District has reserved additional abbreviations marked in italics for the purposes of assigning license plates in the future. This, however, became obsolete from 2023 when a new state-wide numbering scheme was introduced, preserving the same layout, but replacing the initial two-letter district code with arbitrary letters of the alphabet (assigned alphabetically, starting with AA).)
- Website: presov.sk

Prešov (Note: Slovak: [ˈpreʂɔw]; Hungarian: Eperjes [ˈɛpɛrjɛʃ]; German: Eperies; Rusyn and Ukrainian: Пряшів [ˈprʲɑʃiu̯].) is a city in eastern Slovakia. It is the seat of administrative Prešov Region (Slovak: Prešovský kraj) and Šariš. With a population of approximately 85,000 for the city, and in total more than 100,000 with the urban area, it is the second-largest city in eastern Slovakia and the third-largest city in all of Slovakia, after the nearby city of Košice. It belongs to the Košice-Prešov agglomeration and is the natural cultural, economic, transport, and administrative center of the Prešov Region. It lends its name to the Eperjes-Tokaj Hill-Chain, which was considered the geographic entity on the first map of Hungary from 1528. There are many tourist attractions in Prešov, such as castles (e.g. Šariš Castle), pools, and the old town.

== Etymology ==
The first written mention is from 1247 (Theutonici de Epuryes). Several authors derived the name from Hungarian eper (strawberry).

Other alternative names of the city include Preschau (in German), Eperjes (in Hungarian), Preszów (in Polish), Peryeshis (in Romani), Пряшев (Pryashev) (in Russian), Пряшово (Pryashovo) (in Rusyn) (Note: Subcarpathian and Pr'ašiv Rusyn) and Пряшів (Priashiv) (in Ukrainian).

People from Prešov are traditionally known as koňare which means "horse keepers". (Note: Public horse breeding stud was built in 1859 in Prešov on Sabinovská street, it was a stop for horses on their way to Budapest and gained popularity quickly, so citizens of Prešov were called horse keepers after this famous spot of Austria-Hungary. Horses are also depicted on the jerseys of Prešov's football team, 1. FC Tatran Prešov, which is the very first official football team in Slovakia, was founded on 25 May 1898 as Eperjesi Torna és Vívó Egyesület (in Hungarian).)

== Characteristics ==
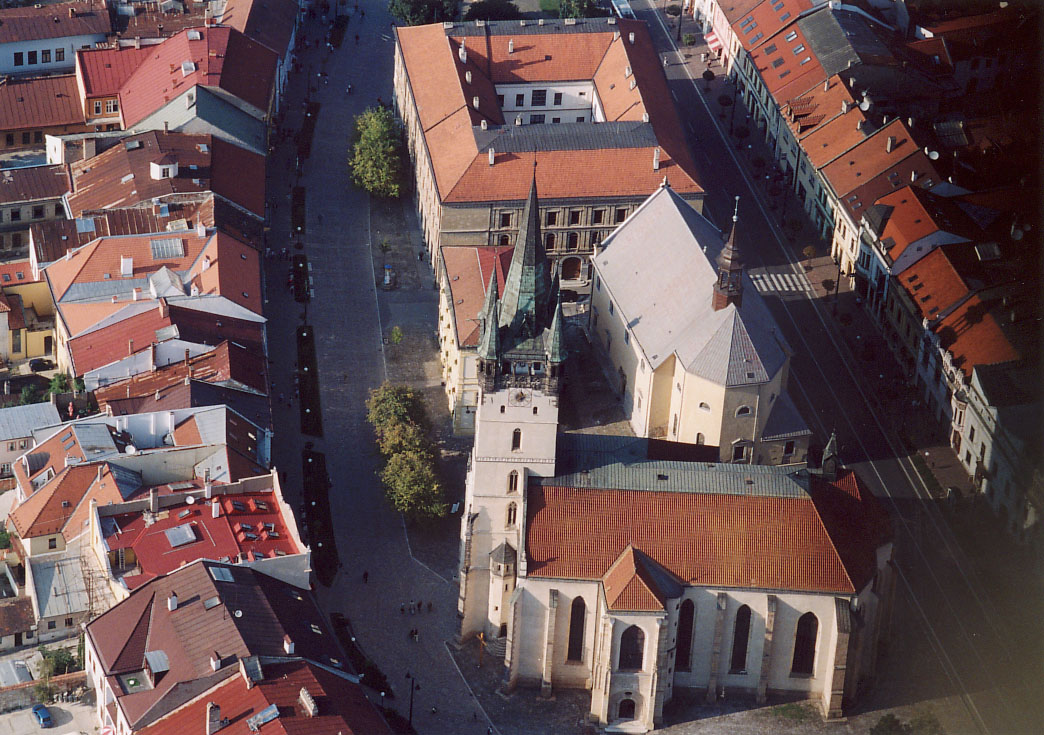
View over Co-Cathedral of Saint Nicholas, Prešov

The old town is a showcase of Baroque, Rococo, and Gothic architecture. The historical center is lined with buildings built in these styles. On the outskirts, however, the Soviet influence is clearly evident through the massive concrete panel buildings (paneláky) of the housing estates (sídliská) and specifically the Sekčov housing estate, the largest housing estate in Prešov. More Soviet-style architecture is seen in the government buildings near the city center.

Significant industries in the city include mechanical and electrical engineering companies and the clothing industry. Solivary, the only salt mining and processing company in Slovakia, also operates in the city. The city is the seat of a Greek Catholic metropolitan see and of the primate of the autocephalous Orthodox Church of the Czech Lands and Slovakia.

Many concerts, operas, operettas, and stage plays are performed at the new building of the Jonáš Záborský Theatre (Divadlo Jonáša Záborského), as well as at the older theatre premises.

The city and the region were contenders for European Capital of Culture 2013. The nearby city of Košice was chosen.

== Topography ==
Prešov lies in the eastern part of Slovakia at the confluence of the rivers Torysa and Sekčov in the Košice Basin. It is surrounded by Slanské vrchy from the east and Šarišská vrchovina from the west. Roads I / 18 (Poprad – Michalovce), I / 68 (direction Stará Ľubovňa), I / 20 (direction Košice) intersect in the town and the south-western connection of the D1 motorway (Poprad – Košice) is being built. The Košice – Muszyna railway line leads through Prešov, to which the lines to Humenné and Bardejov connect. Košice lies 36 km (22 mi) south, Poprad 75 km (47 mi) west, Bardejov 41 km (25 mi) north and Vranov nad Topľou 46 km (29 mi) east.

== City Districts ==
Self-governing city districts. Territorial districts of self-governing city districts:

- Circuit number 1: Sídlisko III, Sídlisko Mladosť, Rúrky
- Circuit number 2: Sídlisko II, Kalvária, pod Kamennou baňou, pod Wilecovou hôrkou, Borkút, Vydumanec, Kvašná voda, Cemjata
- Circuit number 3: north of the city, Mier, Šidlovec, Dúbrava, Surdok, Kúty, Širpo, Nižná Šebastová
- Circuit number 4: city center – Staré mesto, Táborisko, Sídlisko Duklianskych hrdinov
- Circuit number 5: Solivar, Soľná Baňa, Šváby, Delňa, Tichá Dolina
- Circuit number 6: southern part of the housing estate Sekčov – building 1–4
- Circuit number 7: northern part of the housing estate Sekčov – building 5–7, Šalgovík

Cadastral city district: Prešov, Nižná Šebastová, Solivar, Šalgovík, Cemjata

Other districts: Delňa, Dúbrava, Kalvária, Rúrky, Soľná Baňa, Šarišské Lúky, Širpo, Šidlovec, Táborisko, Teľov, Vydumanec, Borkút, Kúty, Surdok

Housing estates: Sídlisko Duklianskych hrdinov, Mier, Mladosť, Sekčov, Sídlisko II, Sídlisko III, Šváby

Previous city districts: Haniska (1970–1990), Ľubotice (1970–1990), Šarišské Lúky (1970–1990, since 1990 it's a part of the village Ľubotice)

In the last few years and today, the construction of new residential areas and satellite towns in Prešov is being realized, especially in the districts Šidlovec, Solivar, Šalgovík, Tichá dolina, and Surdok.

== Watercourses ==
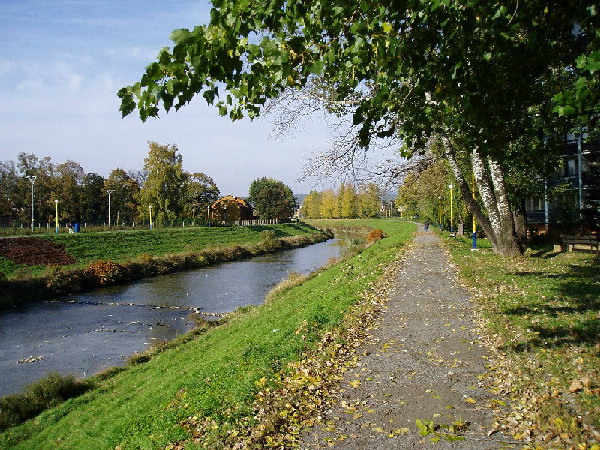
Torysa riverbank

- Torysa with tributaries:
  - Šidlovský potok (L)
  - Vydumanec (R)
  - Malkovský potok (R)
  - Sekčov (L)
  - Delňa (L)
- Continues to Sekčov:
  - Šebastovka (L)
  - Ľubotický potok (L)
  - Šalgovícky potok (L)
  - Soľný potok (L)
  - Baracký potok (R)

== History ==
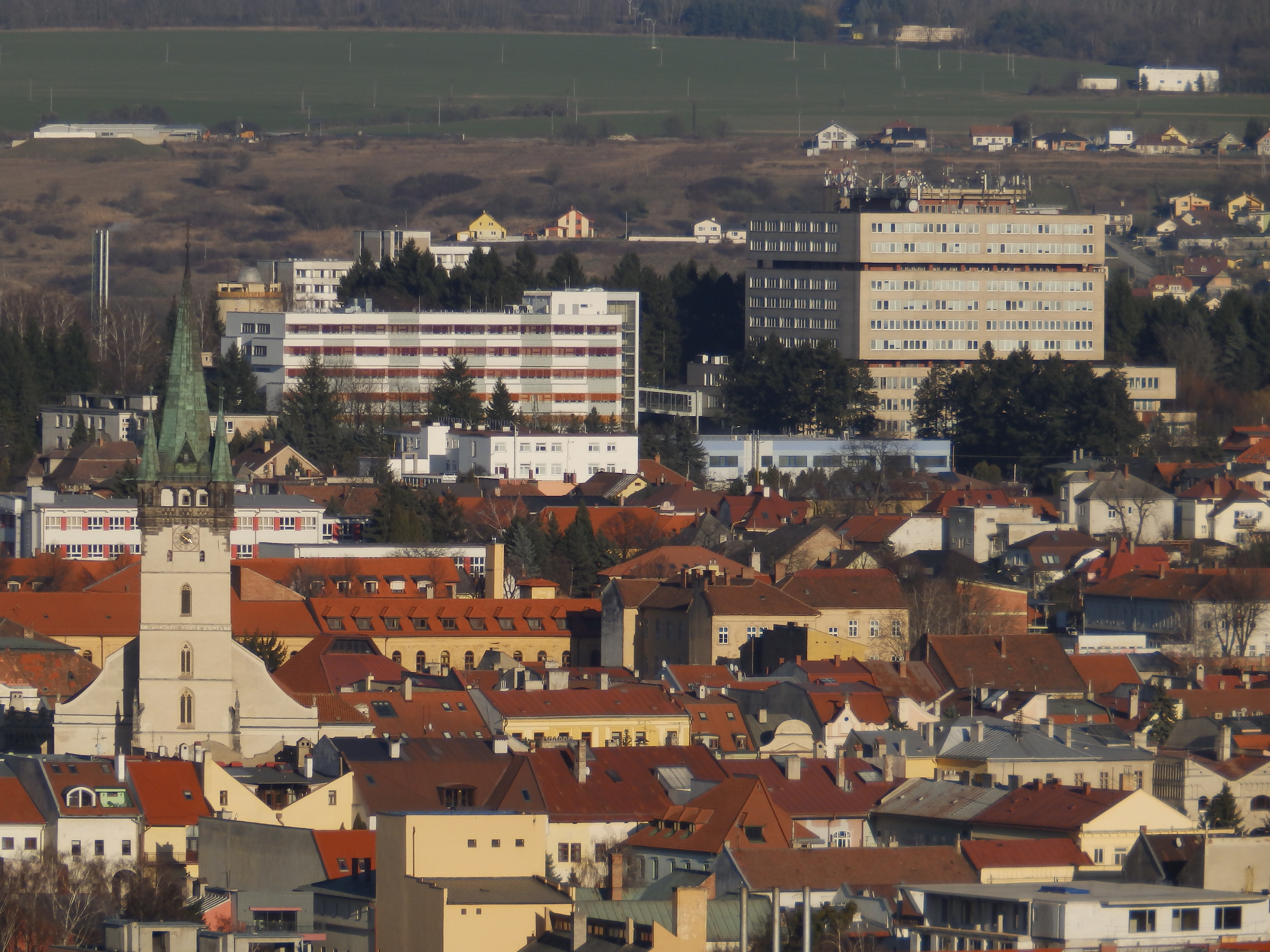
The historic center with the tower of the Co-Cathedral of St. Nicholas. In the background building is the University Hospital

Habitation in the area around Prešov dates as far back as the Paleolithic period. The oldest discovered tools and mammoth bones are 28,000 years old. Continuous settlement dates back to the 8th century.

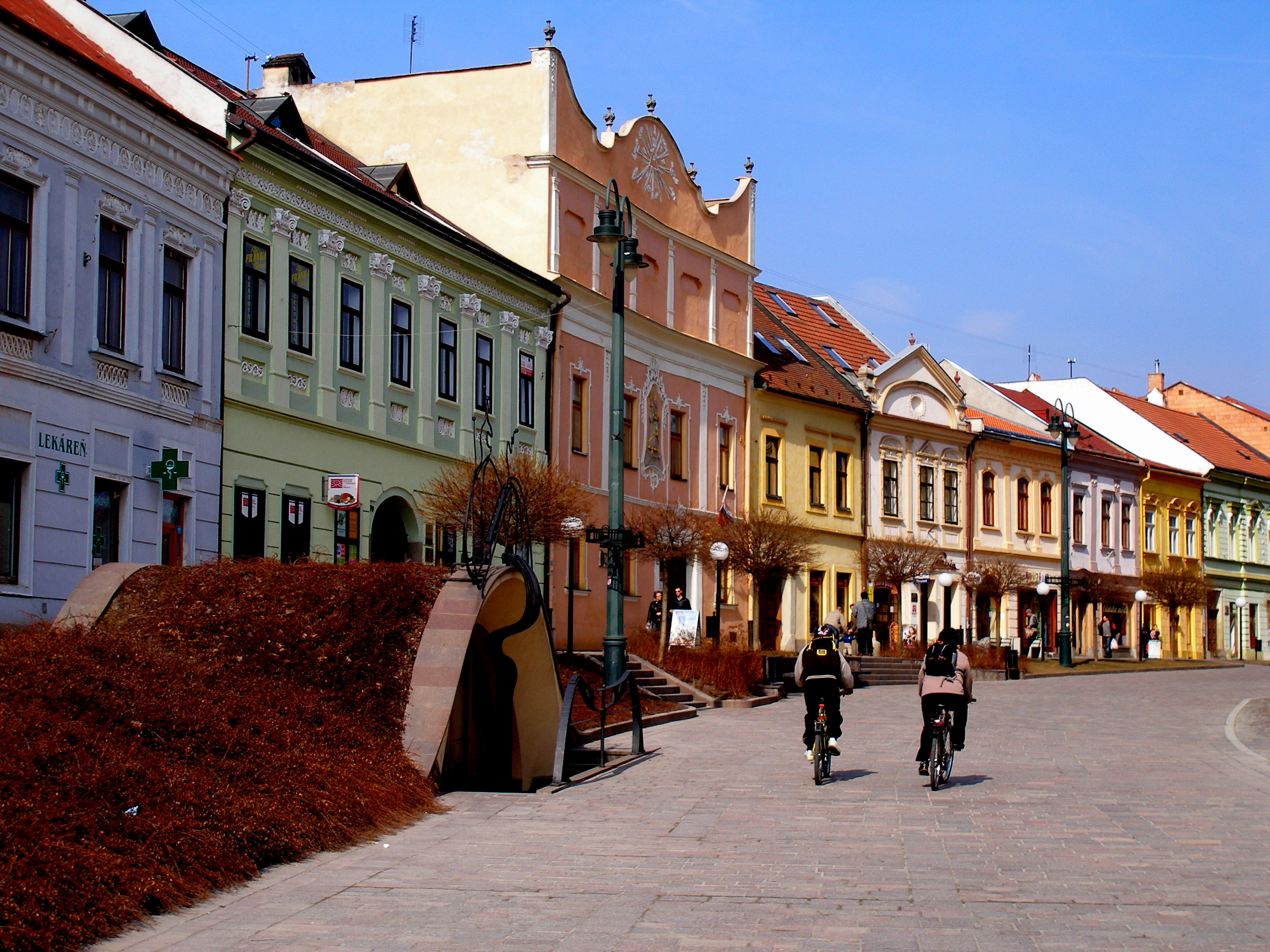
Historic town houses

After the Mongol invasion in 1241, King Béla IV of Hungary invited German colonists to fill the gaps in population. Prešov became a German-speaking settlement, related to the Zipser German and Carpathian German areas, and was elevated to the rank of a royal free town in 1347 by Louis the Great.

In 1412, Prešov helped to create the Pentapolitana, the league of five towns, a trading group. The first record of a school dates from 1429. After the collapse of the old Kingdom of Hungary after the Ottoman invasion of 1526, Prešov became a border city and changed hands several times between two usually rivalrous domains, Habsburg Royal Hungary and Hungarian states normally backed by the Ottomans: the Eastern Hungarian Kingdom, the Principality of Transylvania, and the Principality of Upper Hungary.

Still, Prešov went through an economic boom thanks to trade with the Polish–Lithuanian Commonwealth. In the 16th century, it brought in grape vines from the nearby Tokaj wine region, and was home to German-Hungarian, Polish, and Greek wine merchants. Some of the first books on Tokaj wine were written in German in Prešov.

In 1572, salt mining began in Solivar (at that time a nearby town, now a part of Prešov).

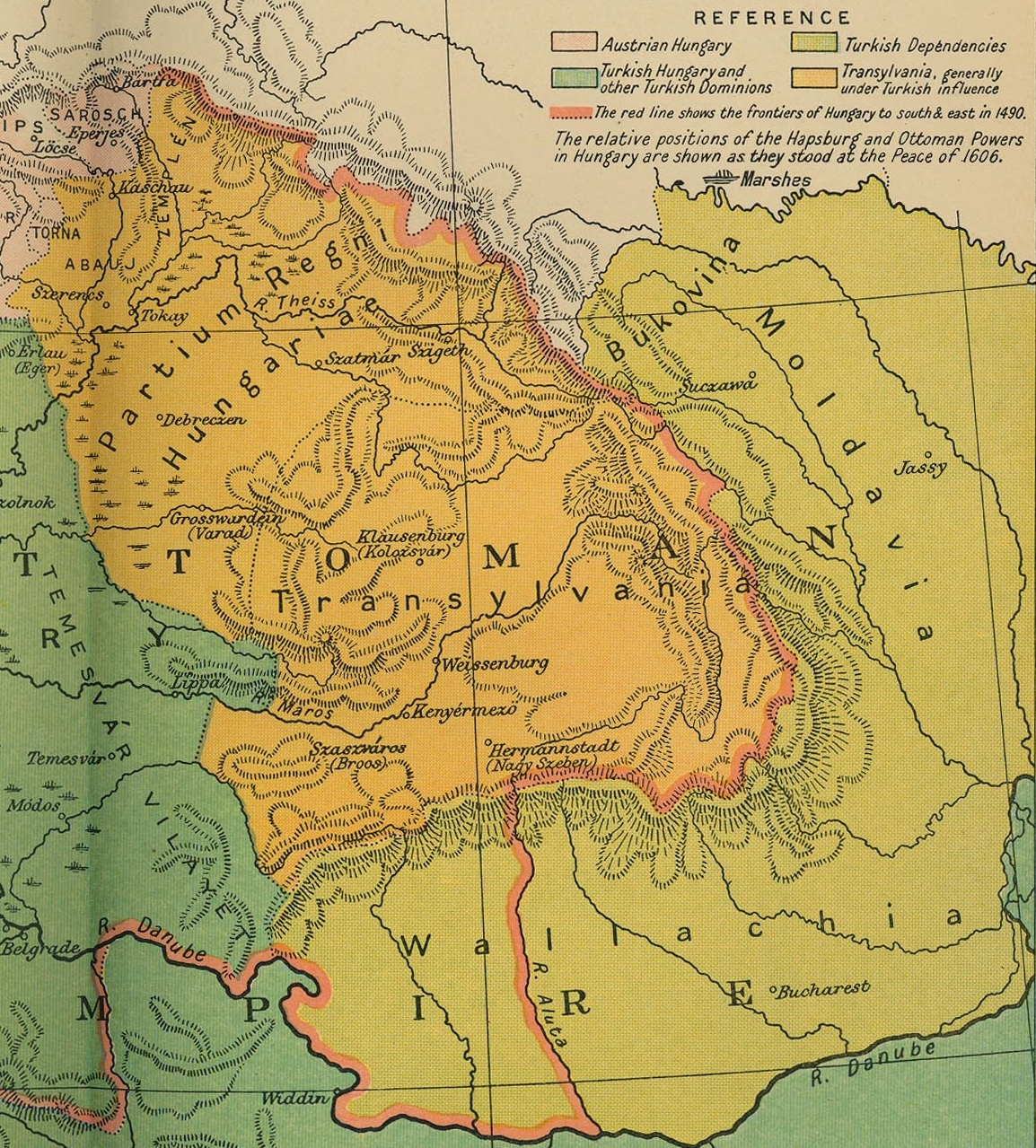
Prešov, named here as Eperjes, shown close to the border with Transylvania in 1606.

Antun Vrančić, a Croatian prelate, writer, diplomat and Archbishop of Esztergom, died in Prešov in 1573.

Prešov was prominent in the Protestant Reformation. It was at the front line in the 1604–1606 Bocskai uprising, when Imperial Army commander Giorgio Basta retreated to the town after failing to take Košice from the Protestant rebels.

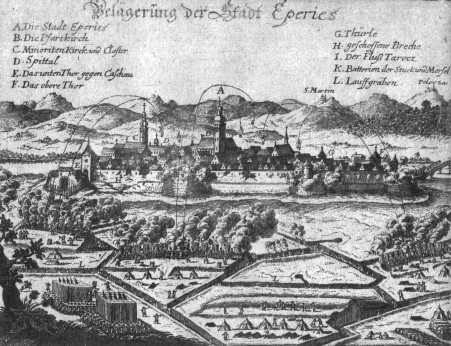
A 17th-century siege of Prešov, named here as Eperies.

In 1647, the Habsburgs designated it the capital of Sáros County. In late January 1657, Transylvanian Prince George II Rákóczi, a Protestant, invaded Poland with an army of some 25,000, which crossed the Carpathians on the road from Prešov to Krosno.

Wolfgang Schustel, a Lutheran reformer during the Reformation, who adopted an uncompromising position on public piety, worked in Prešov and other towns. In 1667, the important Evangelical Lutheran College of Eperjes was established by Lutherans in the town.

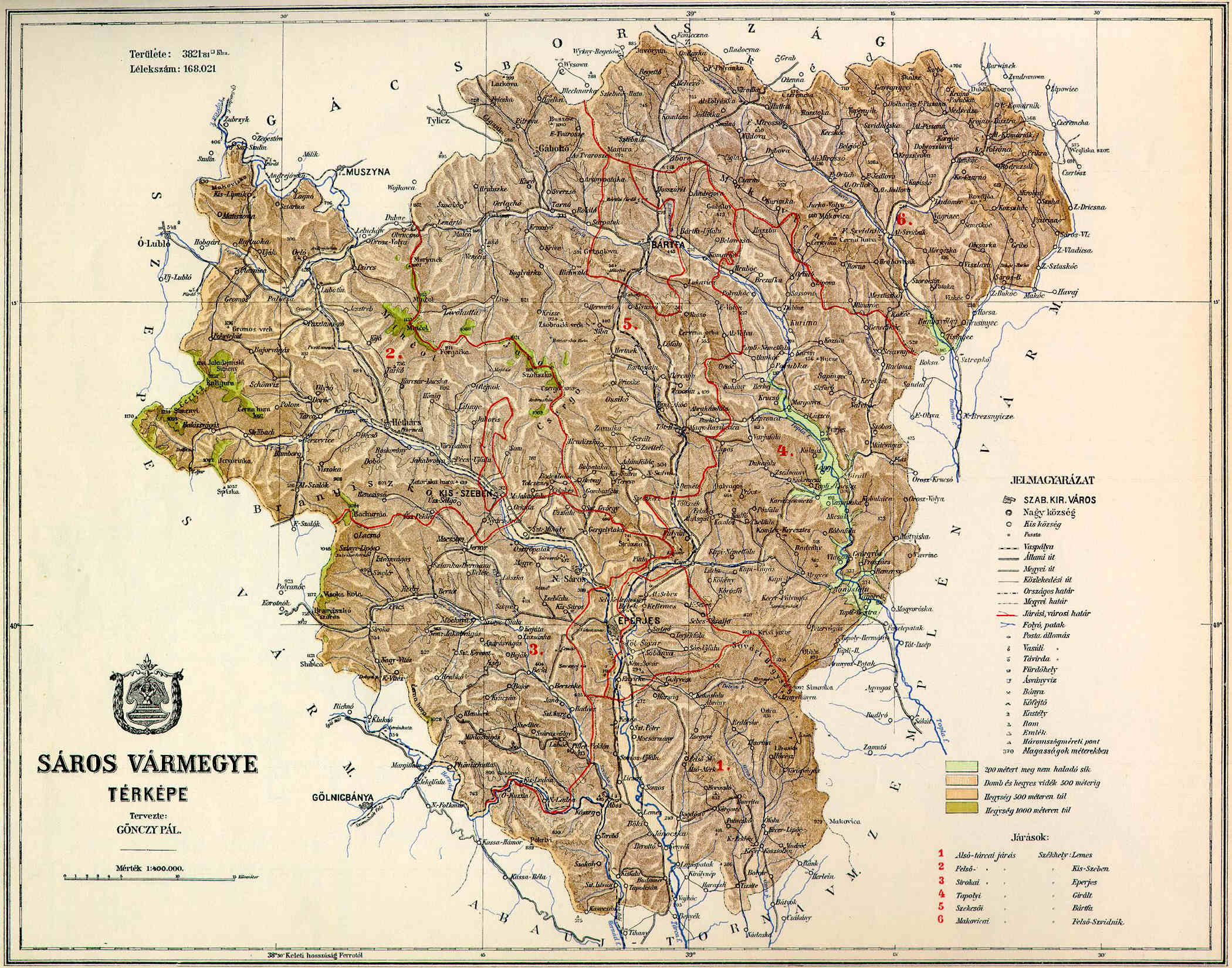
Map of Sáros County showing Prešov, named here as Eperjes.

Imre Thököly, the Protestant Hungarian rebel and Ottoman ally, studied at the Protestant college here. In 1685, he was defeated here by the Habsburgs at the Battle of Eperjes. In 1687, twenty-four prominent citizens and noblemen were executed, under a tribunal instituted by the Austrian general Antonio Caraffa, for supporting the uprising of Imre Thököly:

"The city particularly suffered during the religious conflicts of the seventeenth century, when it had a reputation for Protestant anti-Habsburg sentiment. In 1687, General Carafa, an emissary of the Austrian emperor, imprisoned a group of local noblemen suspected of insurrection in a former wine warehouse off the square now known as Caraffa's Prison. He subsequently, and notoriously, had 24 of them tortured, executed, and their heads placed on spikes around the town, after what we would now call a show trial."

At the beginning of the 18th century, the population was decimated by the Bubonic plague and fires and was reduced to a mere 2,000 inhabitants. By the second half of the century, however, the town had recovered; crafts and trade improved, and new factories were built. In 1752, the salt mine in Solivar was flooded. Since then, salt has been extracted from salt brine through boiling.

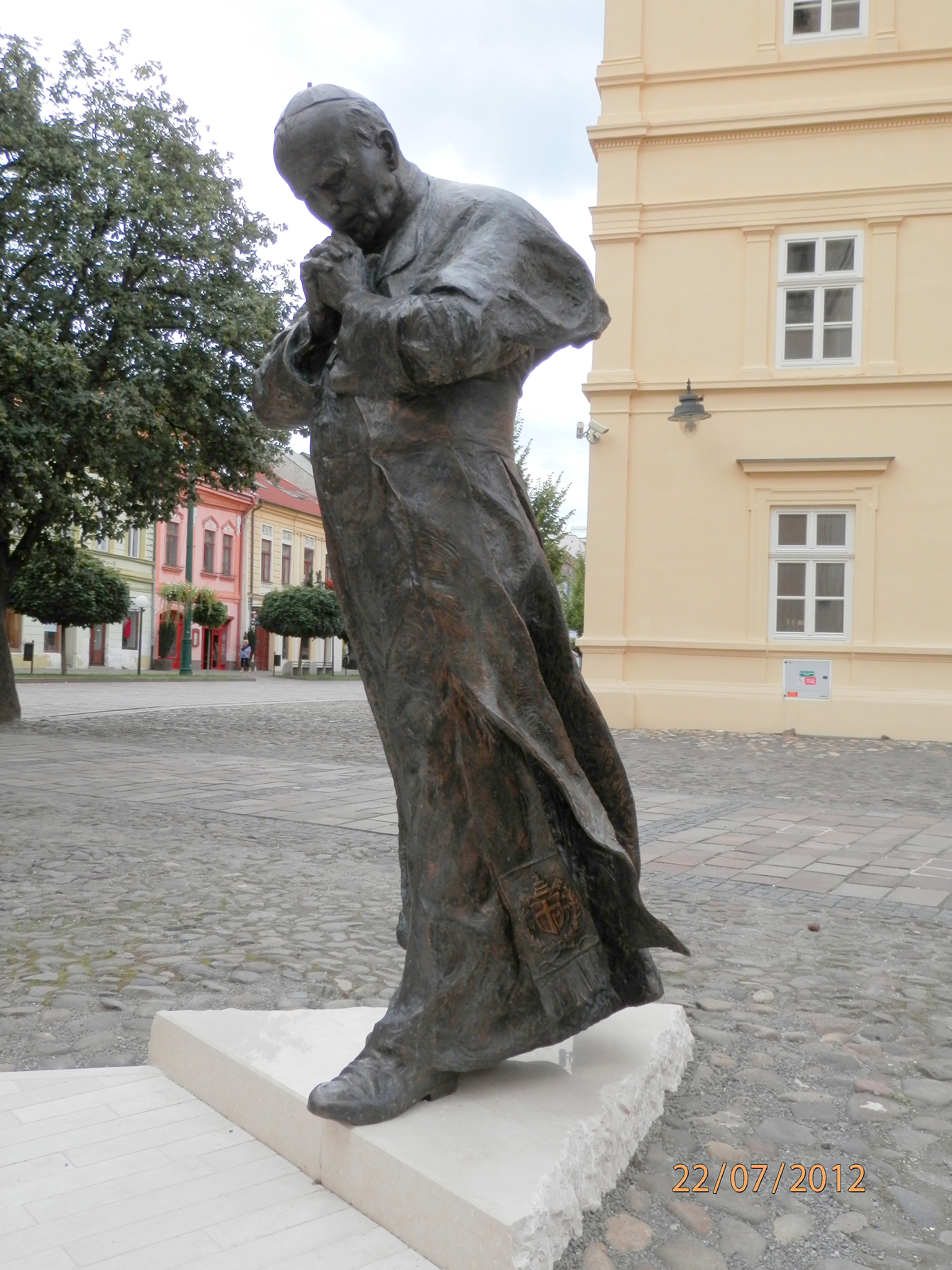
Statue of Pope John Paul II

The English author John Paget visited Prešov and describes it in his 1839 book, Hungary and Transylvania. In 1870 the first railway line was built, connecting the town to Košice. At the end of the 19th century, the town introduced electricity, telephone, telegraph, and sewage systems. In 1887, fire destroyed a large part of the town.

In 1918, Czechoslovak troops began occupying eastern Slovakia, along with Prešov. On 16 June 1919, Hungarian troops entered the city and the very brief Slovak Soviet Republic was declared here with the support of the Hungarian Soviet Republic. The short-lived republic collapsed on 7 July 1919, and Czechoslovak troops re-entered Prešov. In 1920, after the Treaty of Trianon, Prešov definitively became part of the newly created Czechoslovakia. During World War II, the nearby town of Košice again became part of the Kingdom of Hungary as a result of the First Vienna Award. As a result, many institutions moved from Košice to Prešov, thus increasing the town's importance. In 1944, a professional Slovak Theatre was established in Prešov. The city is a site in the Holocaust:

"In 1940, on the eve of the Holocaust, Prešov contained five synagogues and more than one in six of the city's population—4,308 people—was Jewish. Three of the synagogues are still standing, but the Jewish community now numbers fewer than 60. Outside the sole functioning synagogue, on Švermova just off the main square, is a memorial to the 6,400 Jews from Prešov and the surrounding region who died in the Holocaust. The broad path leading to the tombstone-shaped monument, surrounded by prison-like bars, is intended to represent the Jewish pre-war population; the narrow path that leads on from it to the synagogue, those who survived."

About two thousand Jews were deported from Prešov to the Dęblin–Irena Ghetto in May 1942. Only a few dozen survived.

On 19 January 1945, Prešov was taken by Soviet troops of the 1st Guards Army. After 1948, during the Communist era in Czechoslovakia, Prešov became an industrial center. Due to World War II, Prešov lost the majority of its Jewish population. Nonetheless, the population of the city increased rapidly from 28,000 in 1950 to 52,000 in 1970 and 89,000 in 1990.

=== Overview of significant historical events ===
- 4th–5th century – arrival of Slavs to the territory of Prešov
- 1247 – the first written mention of Prešov
- 1299 – granting of city rights by King Andrew III of Hungary
- 1412 (the 80s of the 15th century) – Prešov belongs to Pentapolitana (community of 5 royal cities – Prešov, Košice, Bardejov, Levoča, Sabinov)
- 1429 – the first mention of a town school in Prešov
- 1453 – the first coat of arms of Prešov
- 1455 – granting the right of the city of Prešov to organize an annual three-day fair by King Ladislaus the Posthumous
- 1502–1505 – beginning of the construction of the Co-Cathedral of St. Nicholas
- 1647 – sanctification of the Evangelical Church of the Augsburg Confession of the Holy Trinity Church
- 1667 – College in Prešov, Evangelical Educational Center of Upper Hungary, National Cultural Monument
- 1687 – Caraffa's slaughterhouse, 24 executed townspeople
- 1703 – the beginning of the most powerful anti-Habsburg uprising led by Francis II Rákóczi
- End of the 18th century – arrival of the first Jews in Prešov
- 1816 – Prešov becomes the seat of an independent Greek Catholic diocese
- 1848 – construction of the 1st Jewish synagogue
- 1886–1887 – big devastating fires affect Prešov
- 1 November 1918 – in the afternoon, 41 soldiers and 2 civilians were executed in the city square. This event is also known as the Prešov Uprising (Prešovská vzbura)
- 16 June 1919 – from the balcony of the town hall, the Slovak Soviet Republic (SSR) was declared
- 1923–1924 – construction of the Art Nouveau building of the Bosáková bank
- 20 December 1944 – the bombing of the city is reminiscent of a small monument on Konštantínova Street
- 19 January 1945 – liberation of Prešov by the Red Army, the end of World War II, is reminiscent of the Liberators Memorial
- 1950 – the center becomes a city monument reserve
- 1972 – The Solivary is becoming a national cultural monument
- 2 July 1995 – Pope John Paul II visited Prešov
- 14 September 2021 – Pope Francis visited Prešov

==== The highest representatives of the city ====
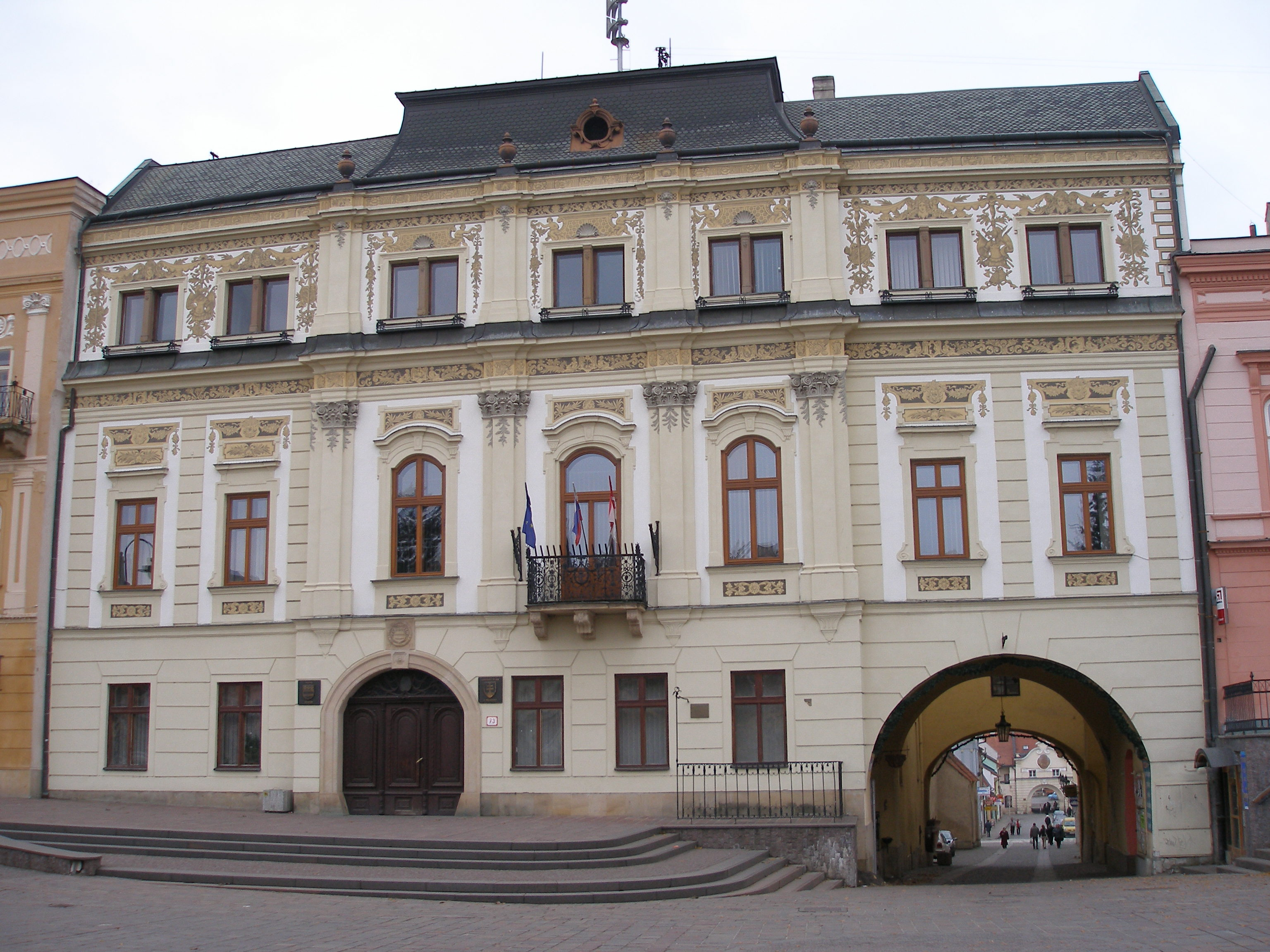
City Hall

By granting city privileges in 1299, the people of Prešov gained the right to elect their Vogt. Such a Vogt embodied the highest executive and judicial power in the city. He was elected among the esteemed burghers, usually for one year. The first Vogt in the city of Prešov, whose name has been preserved, was Hanus called Ogh, who is mentioned in historical sources as early as 1314. However, historians have not been able to complete the list of all the Vogts of Prešov until 1497. For the first time, a woman became the highest representative of Prešov in 2014, when Andrea Turčanová became the winner of the election. In the elections of 2018, she strengthened her position and won the elections to be the mayor of Prešov.

== Military ==
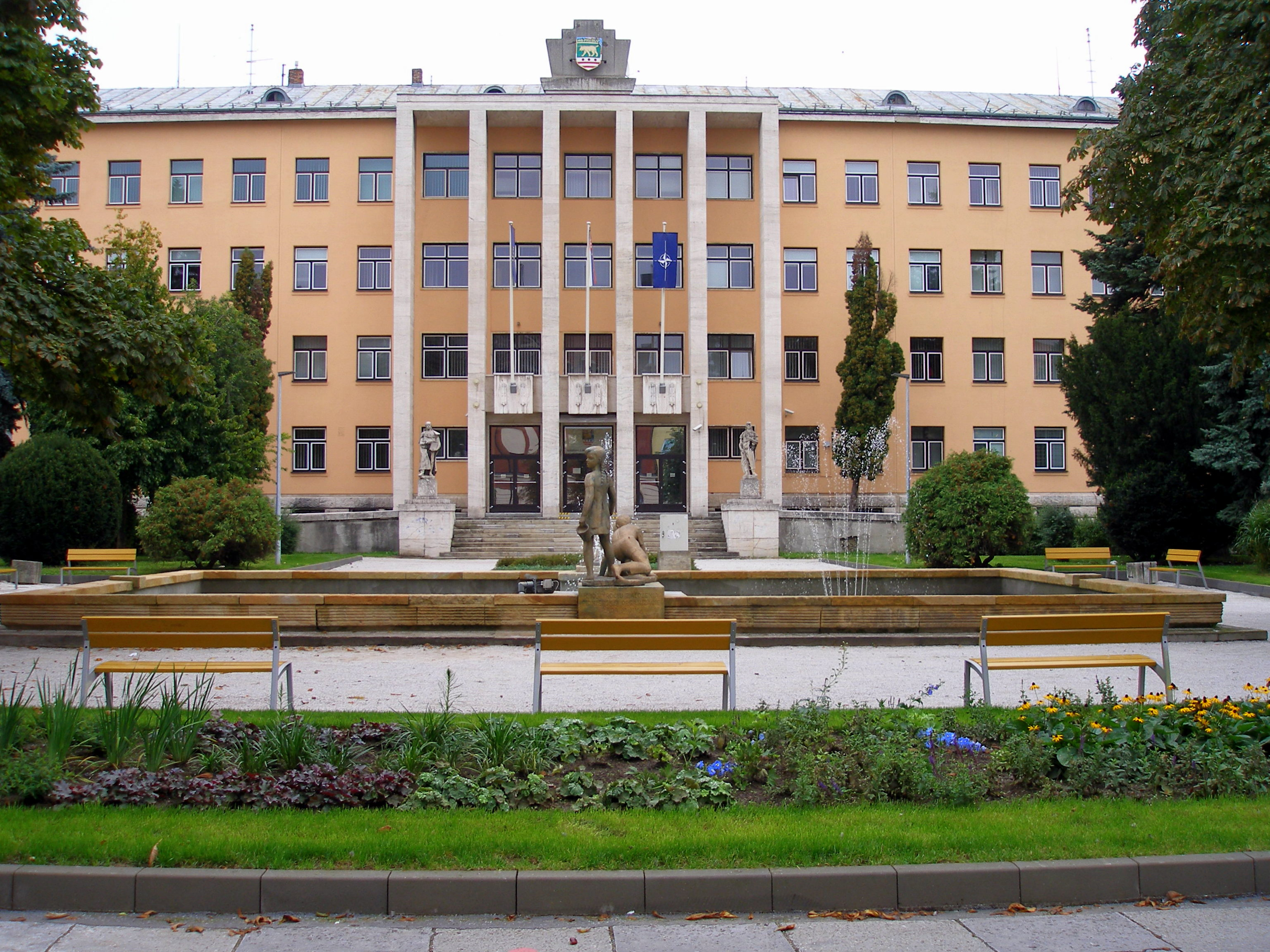
Military headquarters

Prešov already had an important geographical position in the Middle Ages, because it was located at the crossroads of trade routes and also belonged to the important defense system of the emerging Hungarian state. The beginnings of the army in Prešov date back to this area, as Hungarian tribes and their allies, which were military-guard groups of Asian ethnic groups, came to these areas to establish guard settlements and fortresses to defend the emerging Kingdom of Hungary from enemy attacks. To this day, the names of the nearby hills Veľká and Lysá stráž have been preserved.

The city had its own garrison probably since 1374, when it was given the right to build defensive walls with bastions and towers by King Louis I. The importance of the military garrison certainly increased because the city of Prešov became a free royal town in the 14th century. At the end of the 16th century, during the 15-year war with Turkey, the city had to sustain a large imperial army. From 1604, when the first of several anti-Habsburg uprisings of the Hungarian estates broke out, until 1710, when the city capitulated to a strong Habsburg army, Prešov was besieged many times by various insurgent troops, even by imperial troops. For example: Bocskai uprising, General Bast's troops, George I Rákóczi's insurgents, Veshelini's conspiracy, Kuruk's insurgents, Tököli's uprising, General Caraffa's Prešov slaughterhouses, and the insurgents led by Francis II Rákóczi. Prešov then flourished until 1848, because it did not experience any war.

The revolutionary years of 1848–49 pulled not only the free royal city of Prešov, but the whole country into the whirlwind of events. Due to its strategic location, Prešov experienced several changes of military forces during this period. For example, General Schlick's imperial army was replaced by Görgey's Hungarian army, which was soon replaced by Austrian and Slovak volunteer units, which in turn were replaced by imperial soldiers together with the Russian army. The fact that the military importance of Prešov continued to grow is also evidenced by the data from the census of 1900, when out of 14,447 inhabitants of Prešov, there were up to 1,349 soldiers. The local military garrison consisted of several units of the joint army and militia, the largest of which was the 67th Imperial and Royal Infantry Regiment. The hardships of World War I and especially its end tragically affected the life of Prešov, because on 1 November 1918, under the influence of the revolution in Budapest, soldiers of the 67th Regiment and some other smaller units in Prešov refused to obey their commanders and looted some shops in Prešov. After the arrival of military reinforcements, the insurgents were arrested, and even though there were no casualties during the riots, the statistical court sentenced the participants in the uprising to death. On the same day, 1 November 1918, 41 soldiers and 2 civilians were executed in the square. This event is also known as the Prešov Uprising (Prešovská vzbura). The bombing of the city on 20 December 1944 was also devastating for the city of Prešov.

From 4 July 1945, shortly after the end of World War II, military units in the territory of Czechoslovakia were reorganized according to the model of the Red Army. Since then, the following military headquarters have been located in the city of Prešov: infantry regiment headquarters, rifle division headquarters, tank division headquarters, motorized rifle division headquarters, mechanized division headquarters, army corps headquarters, and mechanized brigade headquarters.

From 1918 to 2019, these soldiers, who were born in Prešov, brigadier general František Bartko, major general Vojtech Gejza Danielovič, lieutenant general Alexander Mucha, brigadier general Ing. Karol Navrátil, brigadier general Ing. Ivan Pach, major general Emil Perko, major general Jozef Zadžora.

== Geography ==
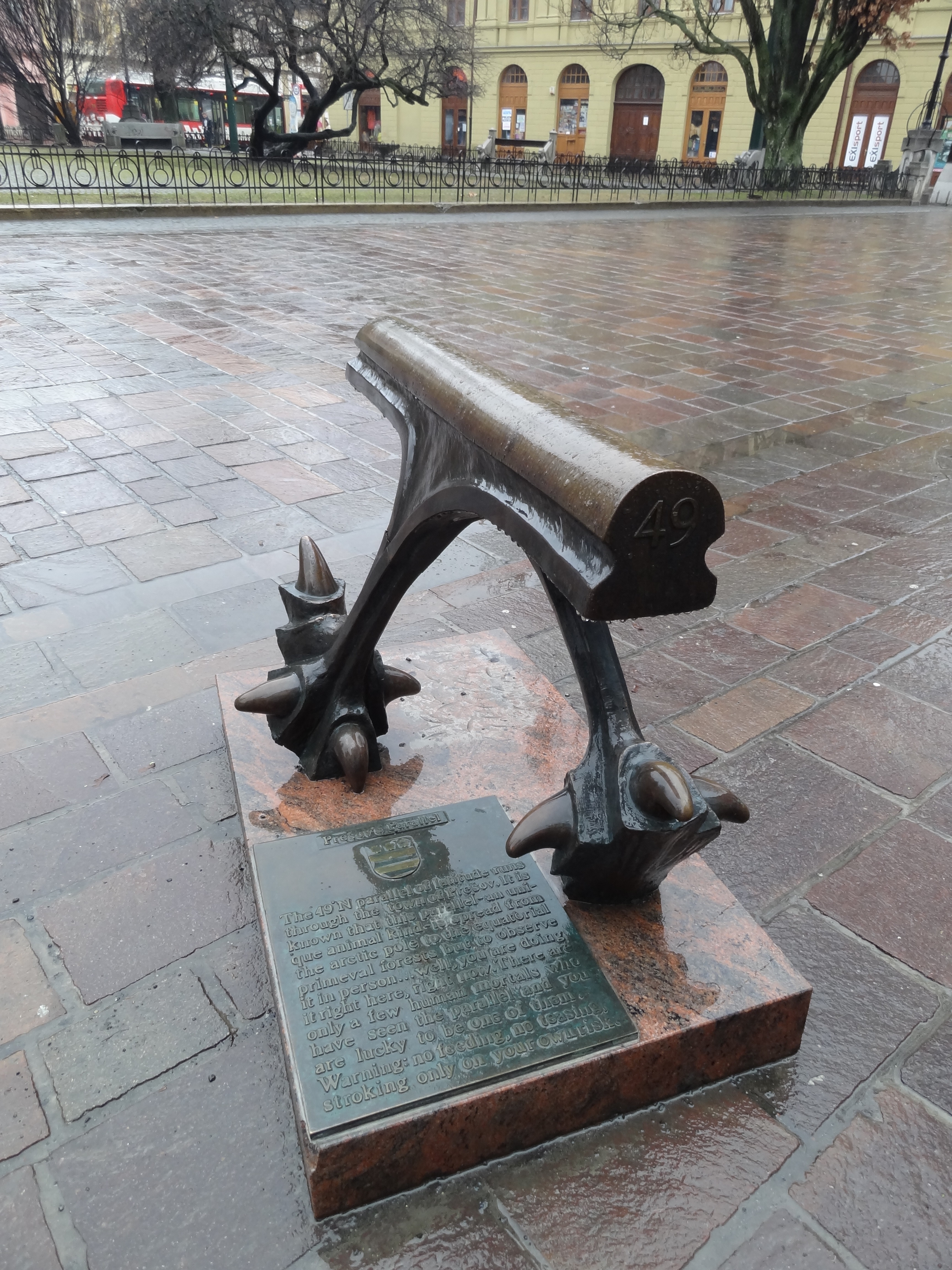
The 49° latitude is marked by a monument.

The municipality lies at an altitude of 296 metres (971 ft) and covers an area of 71.09 km^{2} (27.45 sq mi) (2025). It is located in north-eastern Slovakia, at the northern reaches of the Košice Basin, at the confluence of the Torysa river with its tributary Sekčov. Mountain ranges nearby include Slanské vrchy (south-east), Šarišská vrchovina (south-west), Bachureň (west), and Čergov (north). The neighbouring city of Košice is 34 km (21 mi) to the south. Prešov is about 50 km (31 mi) south of the Polish border, 60 km (37 mi) north of the Hungarian border and is some 410 km (250 mi) northeast of Bratislava (by road).

=== Climate ===
Prešov has a warm humid continental climate, bordering an oceanic climate. Prešov has four distinct seasons and is characterized by a significant variation between somewhat warm summers and slightly cold, snowy winters.

Climate data for Prešov (1991–2020)
Month	Jan	Feb	Mar	Apr	May	Jun	Jul	Aug	Sep	Oct	Nov	Dec	Year
Record high °C (°F)	11.5 (52.7)	15.5 (59.9)	22.3 (72.1)	27.9 (82.2)	32.3 (90.1)	35.1 (95.2)	36.4 (97.5)	35.2 (95.4)	34.3 (93.7)	25.7 (78.3)	20.7 (69.3)	13.8 (56.8)	36.4 (97.5)
Mean daily maximum °C (°F)	0.2 (32.4)	2.7 (36.9)	8.7 (47.7)	15.6 (60.1)	20.4 (68.7)	23.9 (75.0)	25.7 (78.3)	25.8 (78.4)	20.1 (68.2)	13.8 (56.8)	7.1 (44.8)	1.2 (34.2)	13.8 (56.8)
Daily mean °C (°F)	−2.6 (27.3)	−1.0 (30.2)	3.5 (38.3)	9.6 (49.3)	14.2 (57.6)	17.9 (64.2)	19.4 (66.9)	19.0 (66.2)	13.9 (57.0)	8.7 (47.7)	3.7 (38.7)	−1.3 (29.7)	8.8 (47.8)
Mean daily minimum °C (°F)	−5.5 (22.1)	−4.7 (23.5)	−1.2 (29.8)	3.2 (37.8)	7.8 (46.0)	11.7 (53.1)	13.3 (55.9)	12.8 (55.0)	8.6 (47.5)	4.3 (39.7)	0.5 (32.9)	−4.0 (24.8)	3.9 (39.0)
Record low °C (°F)	−21.6 (−6.9)	−22.7 (−8.9)	−18.0 (−0.4)	−7.8 (18.0)	−7.2 (19.0)	2.8 (37.0)	5.0 (41.0)	4.7 (40.5)	−2.3 (27.9)	−11.7 (10.9)	−14.3 (6.3)	−24.8 (−12.6)	−24.8 (−12.6)
Average precipitation mm (inches)	21.7 (0.85)	24.8 (0.98)	24.1 (0.95)	43.2 (1.70)	82.8 (3.26)	95.0 (3.74)	110.2 (4.34)	76.8 (3.02)	56.7 (2.23)	53.8 (2.12)	33.0 (1.30)	25.9 (1.02)	647.9 (25.51)
Average precipitation days (≥ 1.0 mm)	5.8	5.9	5.4	7.5	10.8	10.2	11.6	8.4	7.5	7.9	6.4	6.4	93.9
Average snowy days	12.8	11.1	7.3	1.9	0.0	0.0	0.0	0.0	0.0	0.8	5.0	10.9	49.8
Average relative humidity (%)	84.7	79.9	71.4	64.0	70.3	69.9	70.3	72.0	76.0	80.3	85.6	86.8	75.9
Mean monthly sunshine hours	46.0	68.3	132.9	181.5	213.9	219.1	232.8	239.2	167.0	114.0	56.1	35.2	1,706
Source: NOAA

== Population ==
=== Modern ===
Population statistic (10 years)
Year	1995	2005	2015	2025
Count	92,687	91,621	89,959	81,223
Difference		−1.15%	−1.81%	−9.71%

Population statistic
Year	2024	2025
Count	81,702	81,223
Difference		−0.58%

It has a population of 81,223 people (31 December 2025).

==== Ethnicity ====
Census 2021 (1+%)
Ethnicity	Number	Fraction
Slovak	75,844	89.41%
Not found out	6329	7.46%
Rusyn	2652	3.12%
Romani	918	1.08%
Total	84,824	

In year 2021 was 84,824 people by ethnicity 75,844 as Slovak, 6329 as Not found out, 2652 as Rusyn, 918 as Romani, 756 as Czech, 685 as Ukrainian, 395 as Other, 260 as Polish, 248 as Hungarian, 165 as Russian, 119 as German, 65 as Italian, 50 as Vietnamese, 47 as Jewish, 47 as Bulgarian, 39 as French, 34 as English, 32 as Albanian, 28 as Moravian, 27 as Chinese, 25 as Irish, 25 as Croatian, 22 as Canadian, 19 as Greek, 15 as Austrian, 10 as Turkish, 10 as Serbian, 9 as Romanian, 4 as Silesian and 1 as Iranian.

Note on population: The difference values of population numbers in the table "Population statistic" and in the sections "Ethnicity" & "Religion" is caused by the use of various statistical methods.

==== Religion ====
Census 2021 (1+%)
Religion	Number	Fraction
Roman Catholic Church	46,449	54.76%
None	16,613	19.59%
Not found out	7449	8.78%
Greek Catholic Church	7346	8.66%
Evangelical Church	3608	4.25%
Eastern Orthodox Church	1305	1.54%
Total	84,824	

In year 2021 was 84,824 people by religion 46,449 from Roman Catholic Church, 16,613 from None, 7449 from Not found out, 7346 from Greek Catholic Church, 3608 from Evangelical Church, 1305 from Eastern Orthodox Church, 268 from Ad hoc movements, 249 from Other, 234 from Church of the Brethren, 217 from Christian Congregations in Slovakia, 206 from Jehovah's Witnesses, 197 from Apostolic Church, 162 from Other and not ascertained christian church, 123 from Calvinist Church, 78 from Paganism and natural spirituality, 77 from Buddhism, 65 from Seventh-day Adventist Church, 51 from Islam, 40 from Jewish community, 28 from United Methodist Church, 25 from Baptists Church, 12 from Hinduism, 9 from Old Catholic Church, 9 from Church of Jesus Christ of Latter-day Saints, 2 from Czechoslovak Hussite Church and 2 from Bahá'i Community.

=== Historic ===
In the past, Prešov was a typical multiethnic town where Slovak, Hungarian, German, and Yiddish were spoken.

Population of Prešov according to "mother tongue" 1880–1910
Mother tongue	census 1880		census 1890		census 1900		census 1910	
Mother tongue	Number	%	Number	%	Number	%	Number	%
Slovak	5,705	56.27%	5,573	53.74%	6,804	47.10%	6,494	39.78%
Hungarian	1,963	19.36%	2,670	25.74%	5,513	38.16%	7,976	48.86%
German	1,889	18.63%	1,786	17.22%	1,705	11.80%	1,404	8.60%
Romanian	2	0.02%	4	0.04%	27	0.19%	170	1.04%
Rusyn	162	1.60%	106	1.02%	121	0.84%	47	0.29%
Serbo-Croatian	5	0.05%	–	–	–	–	–	–
Serbian	–	–	5	0.05%	5	0.03%	2	0.01%
Croatian	–	–	0	0.0%	6	0.04%	4	0.02%
Slovenian	–	–	0	0.0%	–	–	–	–
Other	132	1.30%	227	2.19%	226	1.84%	226	1.38%
Foreign (non-Hungarian)	30	0.30%	–	–	–	–	–	–
Cannot speak	251	2.48%	–	–	–	–	–	–
Total	10,139		10,317		14,447		16,323	

Historical population
Year	Pop.	±%
1910	16,323	—
1930	21,377	+31.0%
1950	20,300	−5.0%
1970	51,917	+155.7%
1980	68,529	+32.0%
1991	87,765	+28.1%
2001	92,786	+5.7%
2011	91,782	−1.1%
2021	84,824	−7.6%

Before World War II, Prešov was home to a large Jewish population of 4,300 and housed a major Jewish museum. During 1939 and 1940, the Jewish community absorbed a flow of Jewish refugees from German Nazi-occupied Poland, and in 1941, additional deportees from Bratislava. In 1942, a series of deportations of Prešov's Jews to the German Nazi death camps in Poland began. Plaques in the town hall and a memorial in the surviving synagogue record that 6,400 Jews were deported from the town under the Tiso government of the First Slovak Republic. Only 716 Jewish survivors were found in the city and its surroundings when it was liberated by the Soviet Red Army in January 1945.

== Religion ==
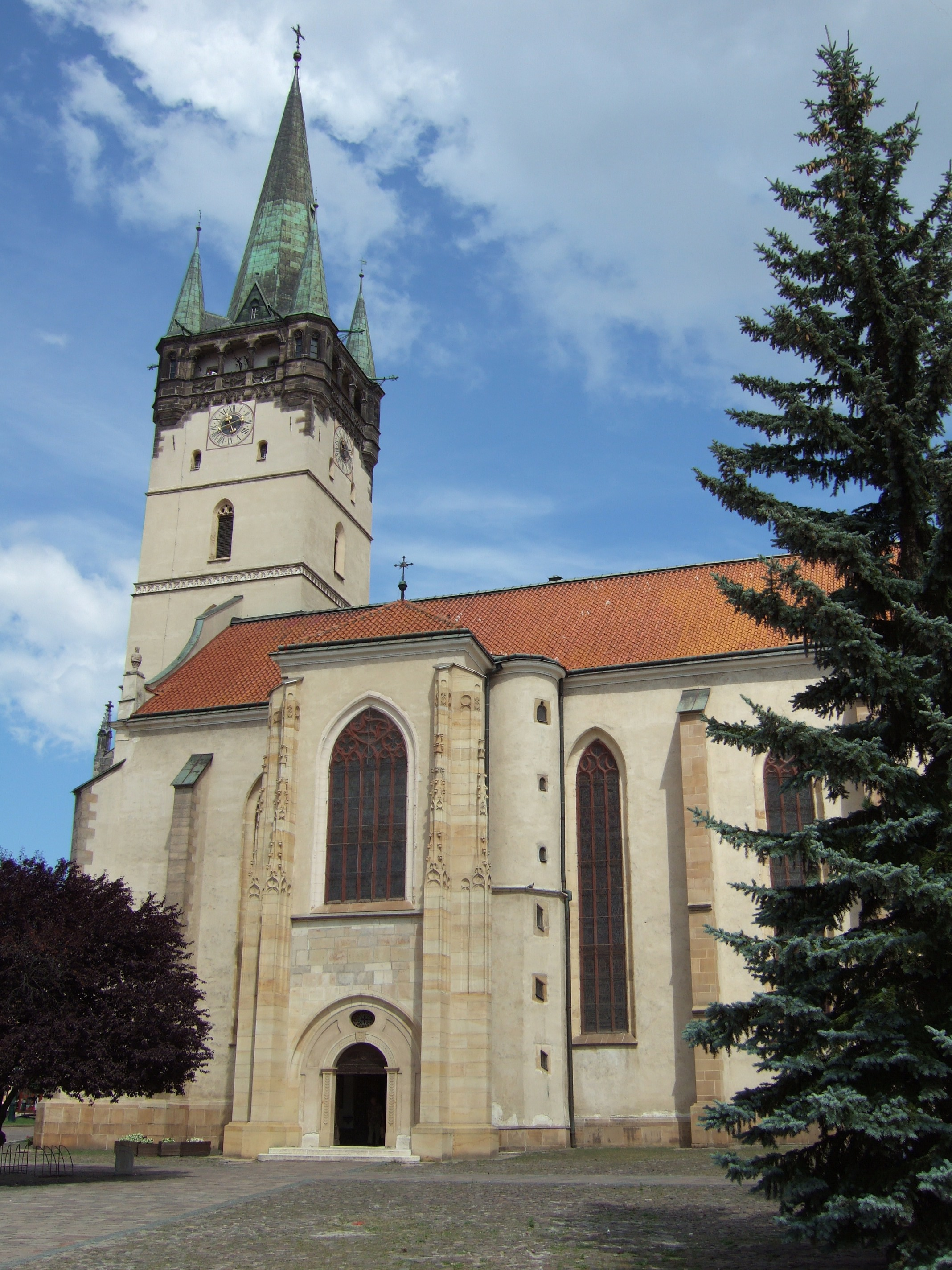
Co-Cathedral of St. Nicholas

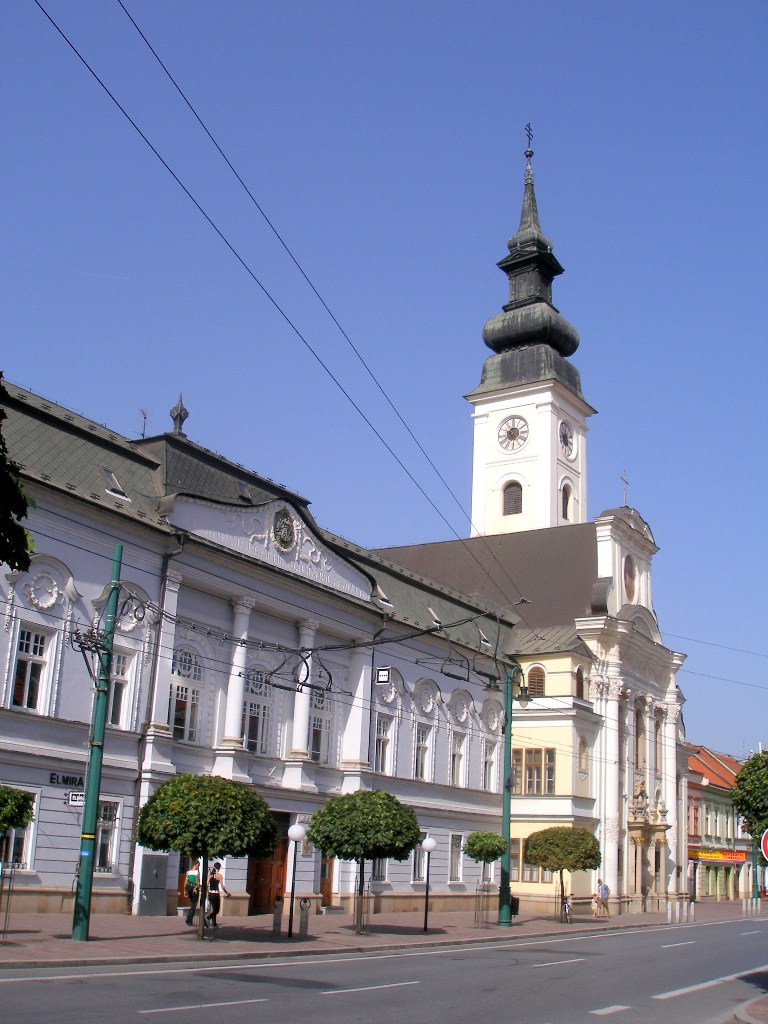
Greek Catholic Archbishop's and Metropolitan Office and Cathedral on Hlavná ulica (Main Street)

=== Roman Catholic Church ===
Prešov is the seat of the Roman Co-Cathedral of St. Nicholas. The city is part of the metropolitan Košice Archdiocese.

=== Greek Catholic Church ===
Prešov is the seat of the Slovak Greek Catholic metropolis and the Prešov Greek Catholic Archeparchy, which was founded on 3 November 1815, by Emperor Francis II.

=== Orthodox Church ===
The Prešov Orthodox Diocese was established after World War II by the division of the Mukachevo-Prešov Orthodox Diocese. The Cathedral of St. Prince Alexander Nevsky was built between 1946 and 1950 in the traditional Russian style.

=== Evangelical Church of the Augsburg Confession ===
Prešov is also the seat of the diocese of the Evangelical Church of the Augsburg Confession in Slovakia.

=== Religious education ===
There are two theological faculties in the city – the Greek Catholic Theological Faculty and the Orthodox Theological Faculty. Both are part of the University of Prešov.

=== Religious make-up ===
The religious makeup in 2011 was 55.8% Roman Catholics, 12.44% people with no religious affiliation, 8.15% Greek Catholics, 4.05% Lutherans, 1.55% Orthodox, 17.16% did not declare any religious affiliation. On the contrary, there was an increase in the number of atheists, Greek Catholics and the unidentified.

== Culture ==
=== Theaters ===
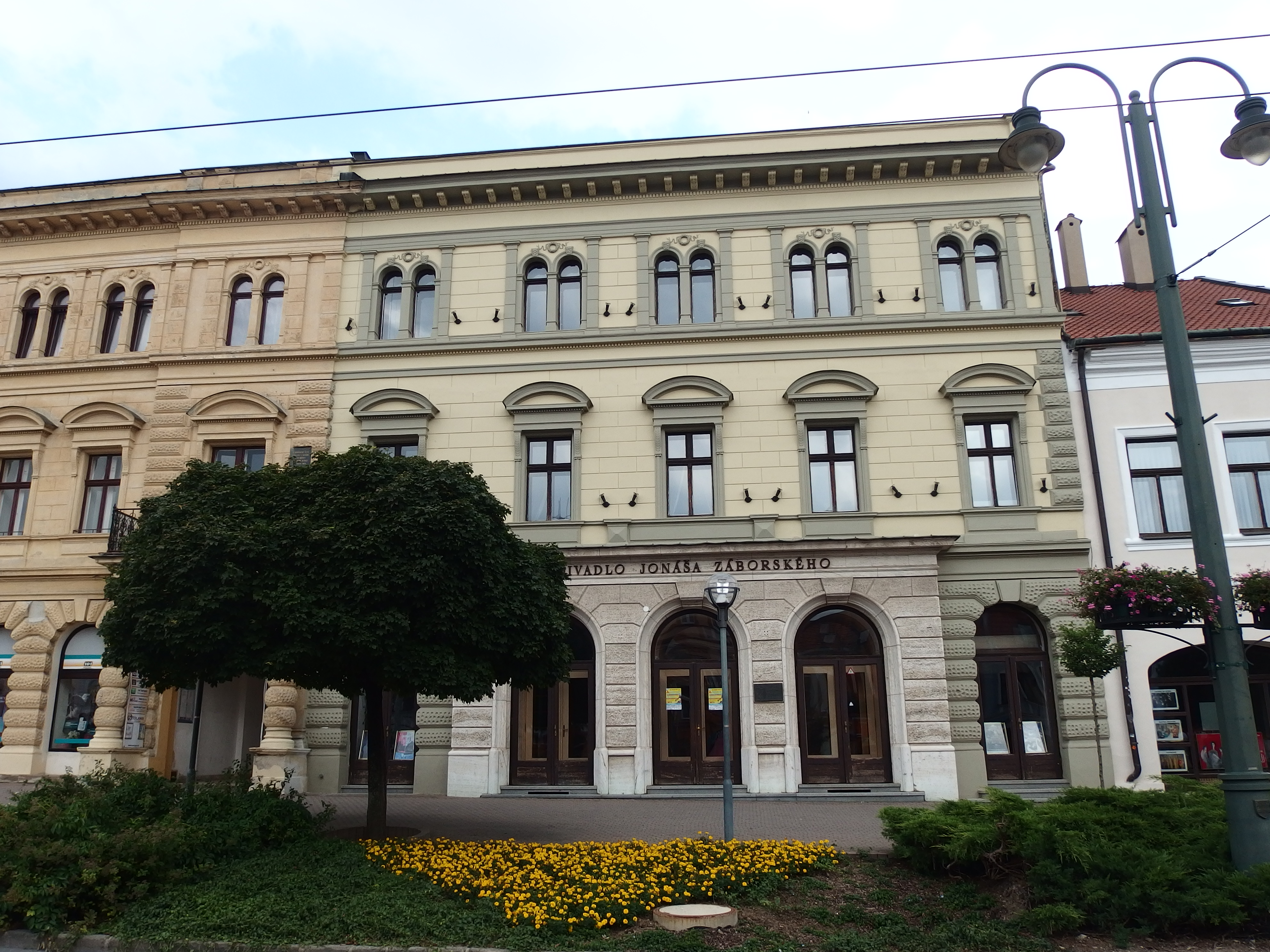
The historic building of the Jonáš Záborský Theater

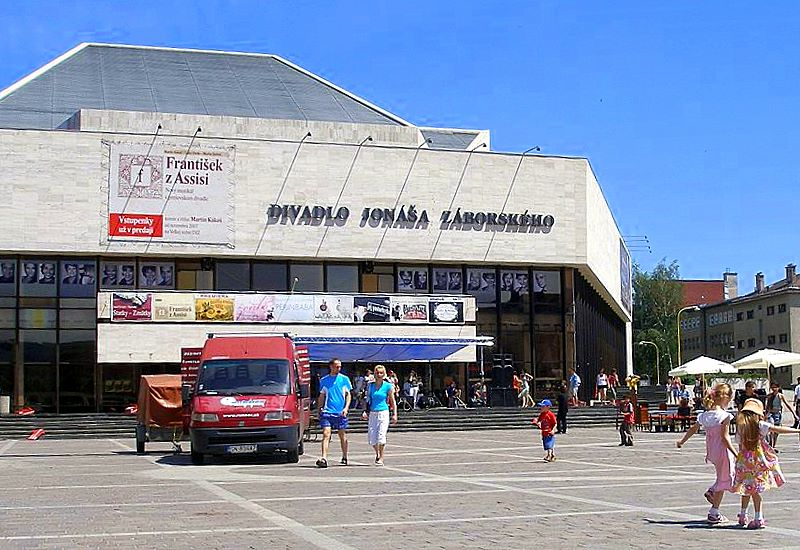
Jonas Záborský Theater

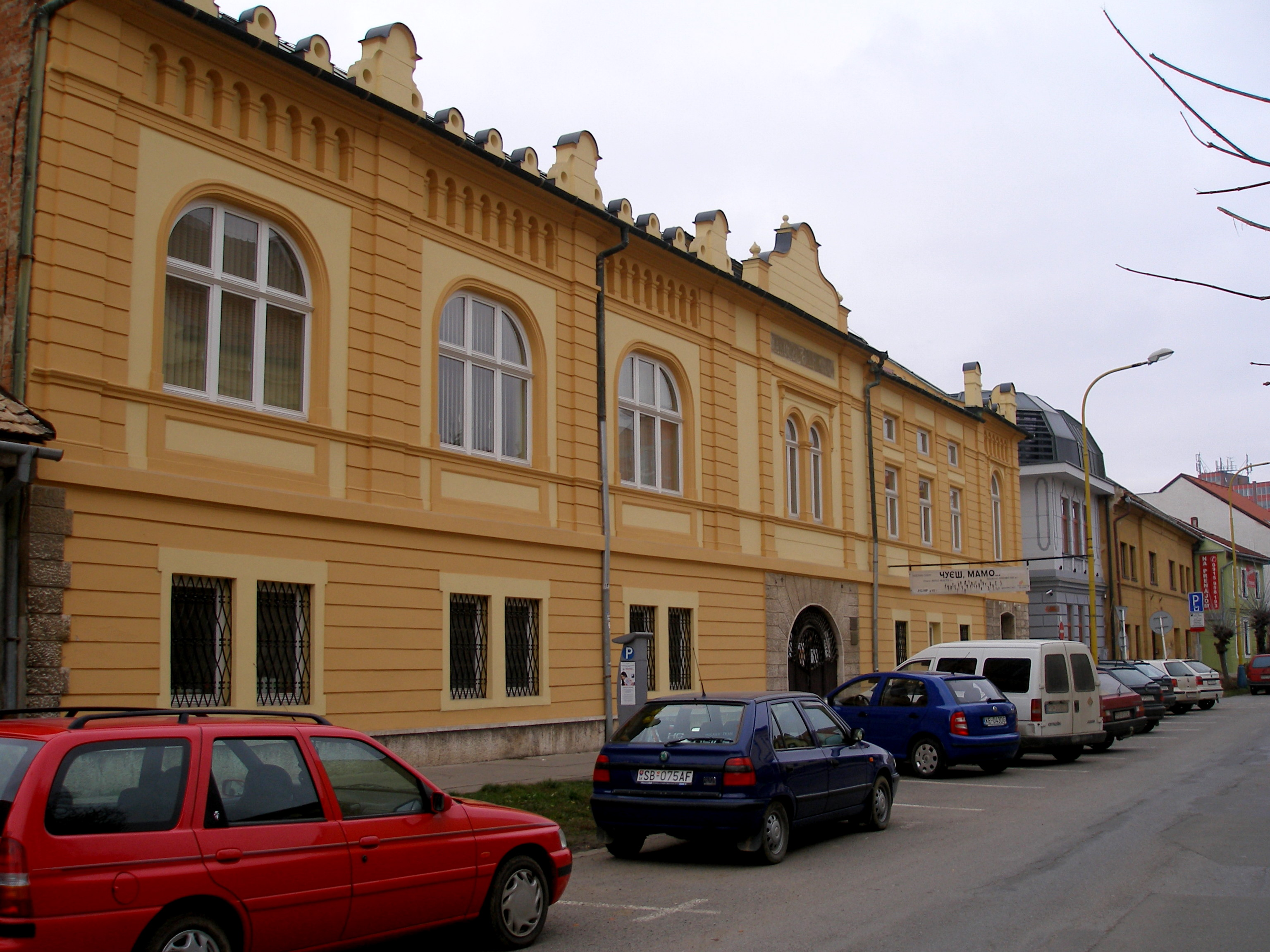
Alexander Dukhnovych Theater

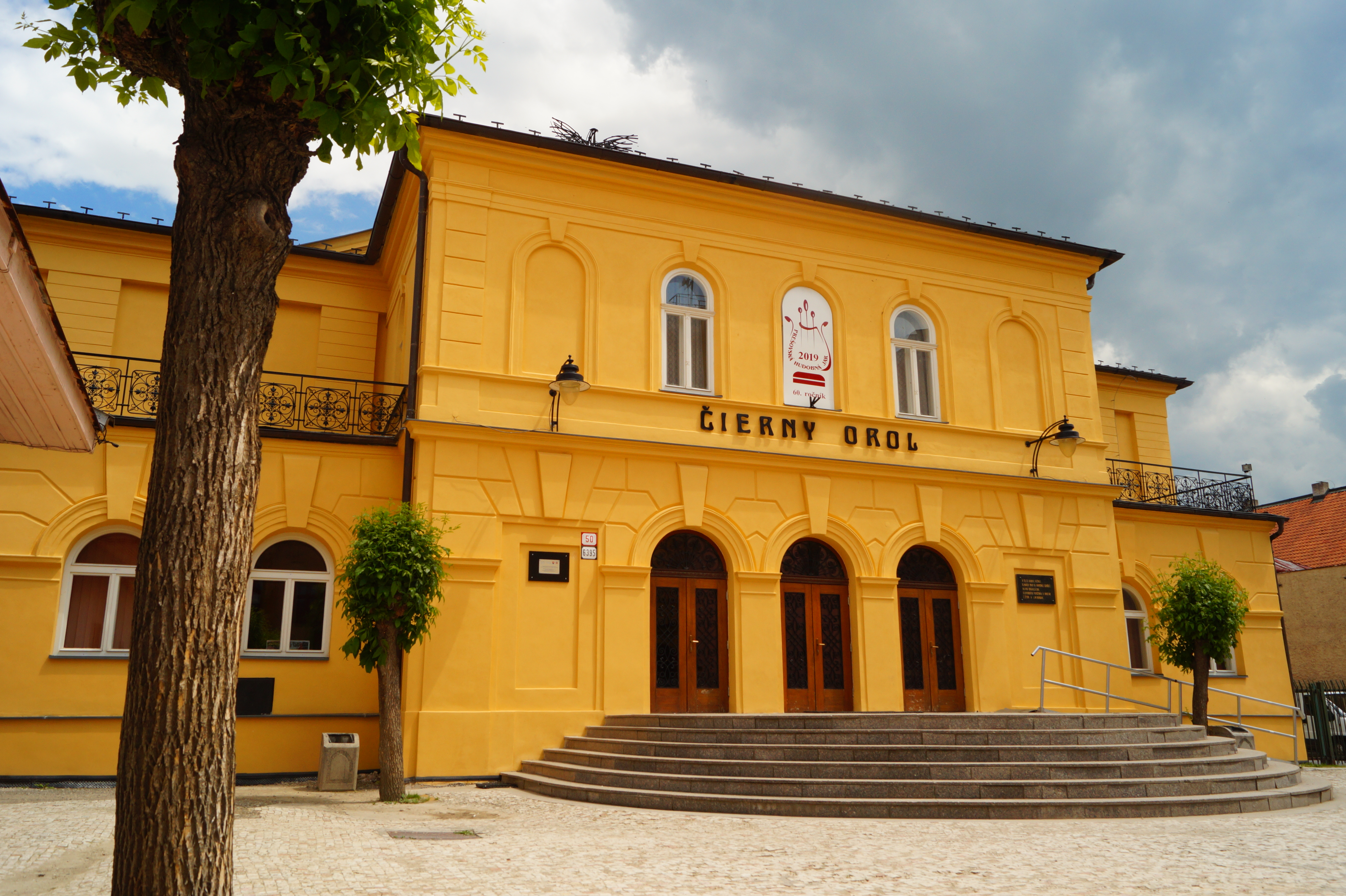
Black Eagle Culture and Recreation Park

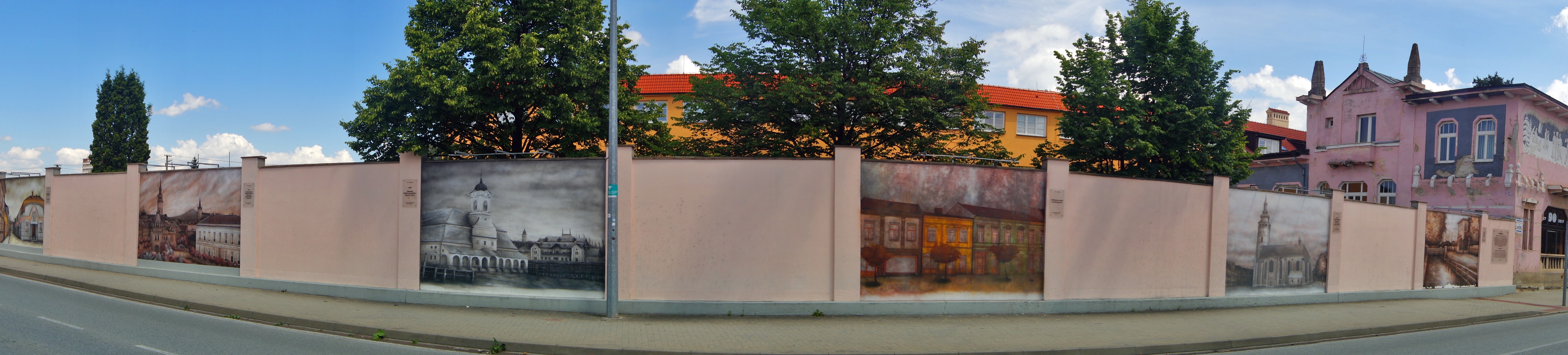
Exterior gallery on Okružná street

- Divadlo Alexandra Duchnoviča (Alexander Dukhnovych Theater)
- Divadlo Jonáša Záborského (Jonas Záborský Theater)
- Divadlo pre deti CILILING (CILILING Children's Theater)
- Detské divadlo Babadlo (Babadlo Children's Theater)
- Detské divadlo DRaK (DRaK Children's Theater)
- Divadlo Portál (Portal Theater)
- Divadelné štúdio na Hlavnej (Theater studio on Hlavná)
- Divadlo Erika Németha (Erik Németh Theater)
- Prešovské národné divadlo (Prešov National Theater)
- Park kultúry a oddychu Čierny orol (Black Eagle Culture and Recreation Park)
- Viola - centrum pre umenie (Viola – center for art)
- Wave~centrum nezávislej kultúry (Wave~center for independent culture)

=== Museums ===
- Krajské múzeum (Regional Museum)
- Múzeum rusínskej kultúry SNM (Museum of Ruthenian Culture SNM)
- Múzeum Solivar (Solivar Museum)
- Barkányova zbierka judaík – expozícia Múzea židovskej kultúry v Prešovskej synagoge (Barkány's collection of Judaica – exposition of the Museum of Jewish Culture in the Prešov Synagogue)
- Múzeum vín (Wine Museum)

=== Galleries ===
- Šarišská galéria (Šariš Gallery)
- Galéria v Caraffovej väznici (Caraffa Prison Gallery)
- Galéria Múr (Wall Gallery)
- Creative Design Gallery
- Galéria Átrium (Atrium Gallery)
- J.D Galéria J.L - exteriérová galéria na Okružnej ulici, znázorňujúca maľby historického Prešova (J.D Galéria J.L – exterior gallery on Okružná street, showing paintings of historical Prešov)

=== Libraries ===
- Knižnica P. O. Hviezdoslava v Prešove (P. O. Hviezdoslav Library in Prešov)
- Štátna vedecká knižnica Prešov (State Scientific Library Prešov)
- Univerzitná knižnica Prešovskej univerzity v Prešove (University Library of the University of Prešov)

=== Cinemas ===
- Scala (former Panorama Cinema)
- Cinemax Max (5 halls)
- Cinemax Novum (8 halls)
- Star OC Eperia (5 halls)
- Záhradné kino (Garden Cinema)
- Amfiteáter Prešov (Prešov Amphitheater)

=== Science ===
- Krajská hvezdáreň a planetárium (Regional Observatory and Planetarium)
- Unipolab - vedecký park Prešovskej univerzity (Unipolab – science park of the University of Prešov)

=== Music ===
Following Prešov's, the city of Prešov has earned the nickname "Slovak Seattle" (Slovenský Seattle) or "City of Music" (Mesto hudby) long ago, mainly through the media. However, many musicians from Prešov work not only within their hometown or region, but also reap success in the whole of Slovakia, neighboring countries, or even Europe.

However, not only the number of mainstream successful musicians contributed to the musical life of the city, in the past and today, but also more or less (un)known groups and musical subcultures, steadily operating in the city foothills (genres: metal, punk, alternative, hip-hop, R&B, gospel, rock, pop-rock, folk, jazz, country, and possibly others), concert rooms and clubs (Véčko, Bizarre, Christiania, City Club, Stromoradie, Za siedmimi oknami, Wave, Ester rock club, Netopier, Staré Mexiko, Insomnia, Ponorka, ENCORE), rock shows of bands with a long tradition (Rocková liga, vyše 20. ročníkov, Prešovský študentský Liverpool, 6. ročníkov, Rebrík) but also festivals (Sigortus, Dobrý festival, (t)urbanfest, ImROCK FEST, East Side Music Festival, Festival zlej hudby, Farfest, Jazz Prešov).

Important events include the Dni mesta Prešov (Days of the City of Prešov), which are held annually on the occasion of the celebrations of the first written mention of the city (as of 2021, 774th anniversary). The celebrations usually include open-air concerts right in the center of Hlavná street, whereas several guests from the domestic and European alternative scene have taken turns throughout the years. That includes: Deti Picasso (Russia-Armenia), Myster Möbius (France/Hungary), Masfél (Hungary), Prague Selection II.; Laura a její tygři (Czech Republic), Srečna Mladina (Slovenia), Squartet (Italy), but also Slovak groups Heľenine Oči, Chiki liki tu-a, Arzén, Mango Molas, Alter Ego, Kapátske chrbáty, and Komajota.

Part of the city's celebrations are also side stages, where young bands can also try their luck.

In 2009, the first Prešov film festival, the Bastion film festival, was established. The festival takes place on the historic wall behind the Franciscan Church. The organizers are PKO Prešov and Prešov composer and guitarist David Kollar.

After many years, the constant influx and modification of music groups, which are often enforced throughout Slovakia, required documentation, which took place through the internet database of Prešov bands and performers under the name Frenky's Music Encyclopedia. Historically and currently, the ever-growing database of Prešov musicians is run by Michal Frank, a journalist and editor-in-chief of the Prešov Korzár.

Prominent Prešov musicians and bands include IMT Smile, Peha, Katarína Knechtová, Katarína Koščová, Peter Lipa, David Kollar, Hrdza and Peter Nagy.

== Buildings ==
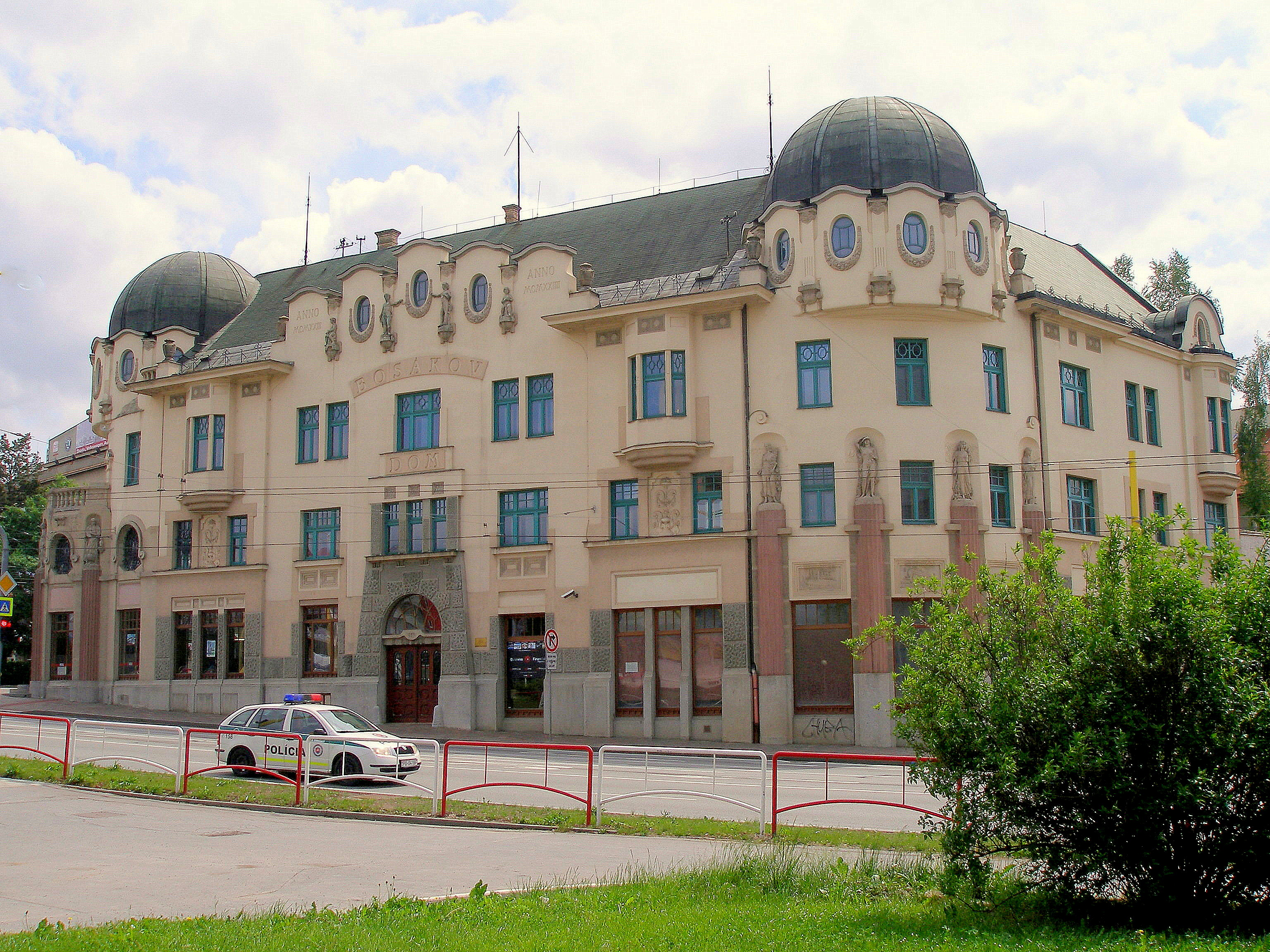
Bosák's house

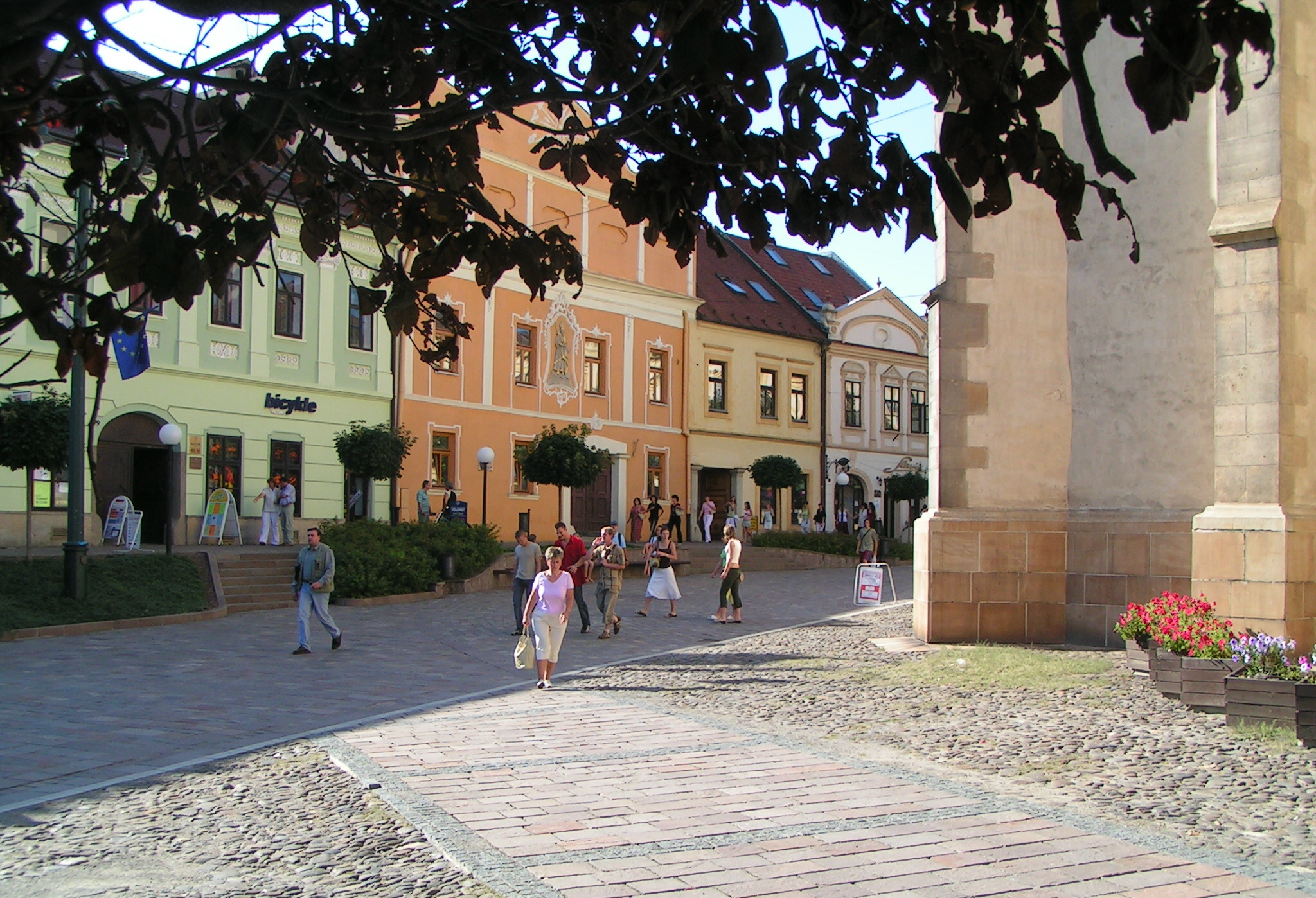
Historic houses and St. Nicolaus Church

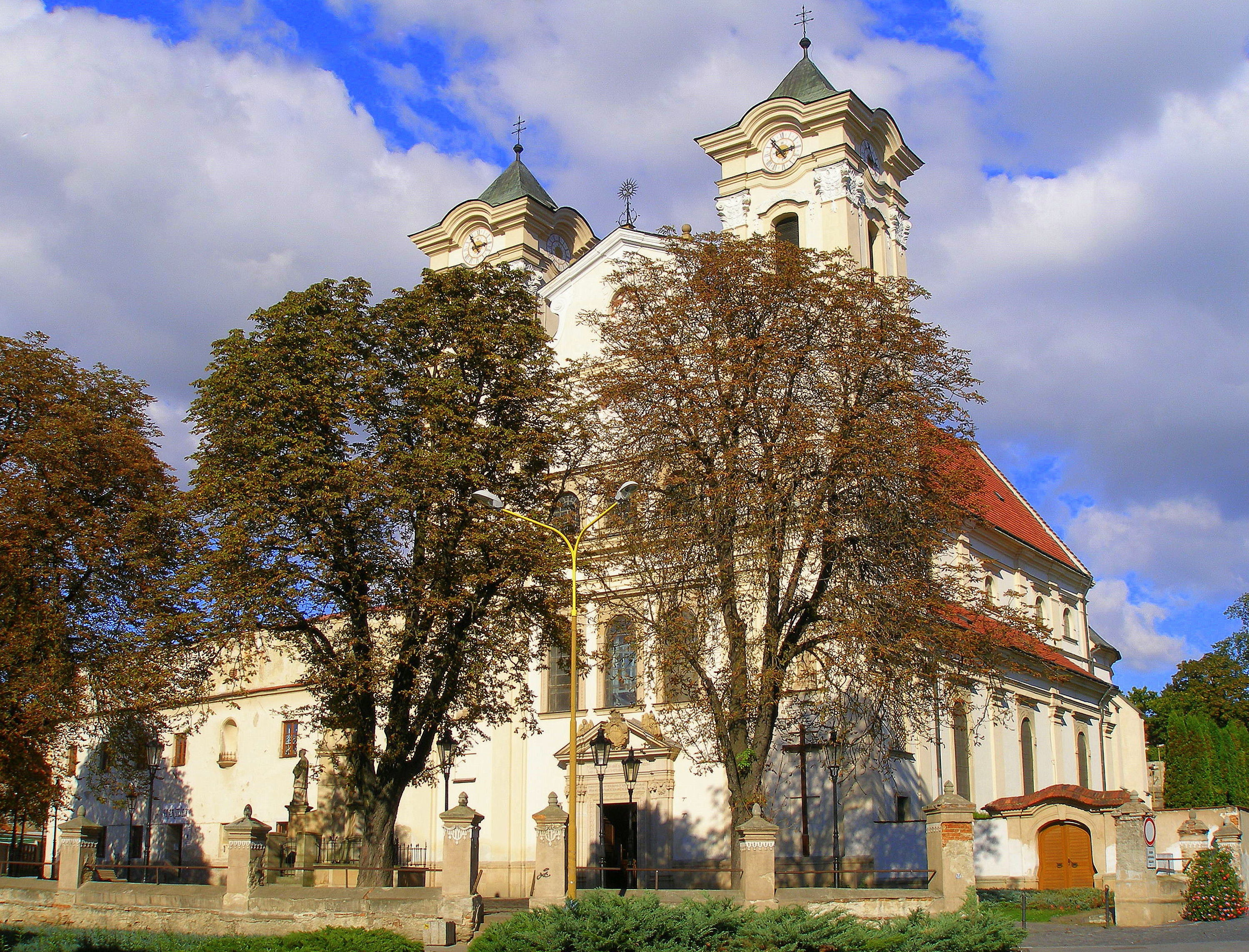
Church of St. Joseph (Franciscan)

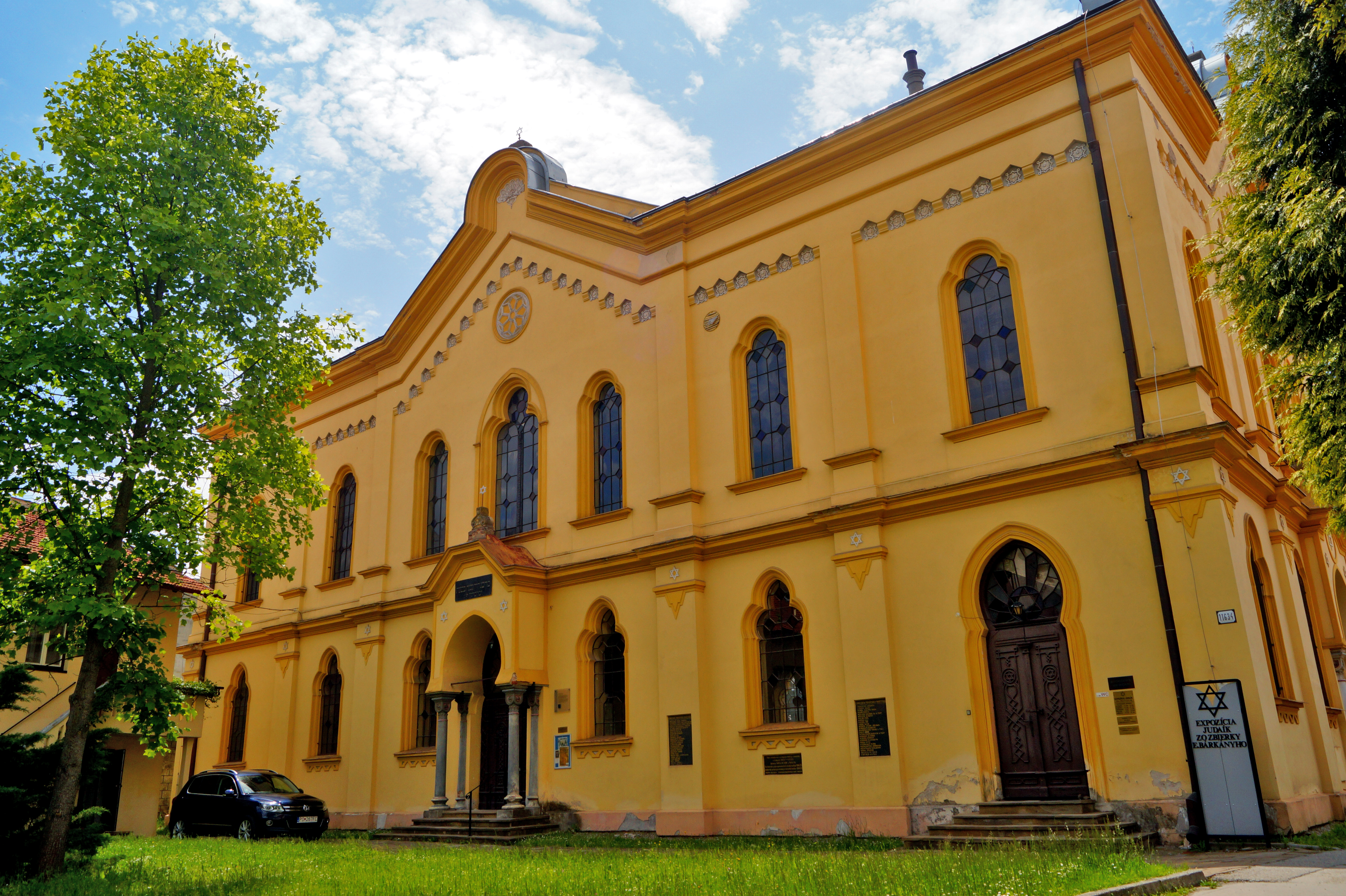
Orthodox synagogue on Okružná street

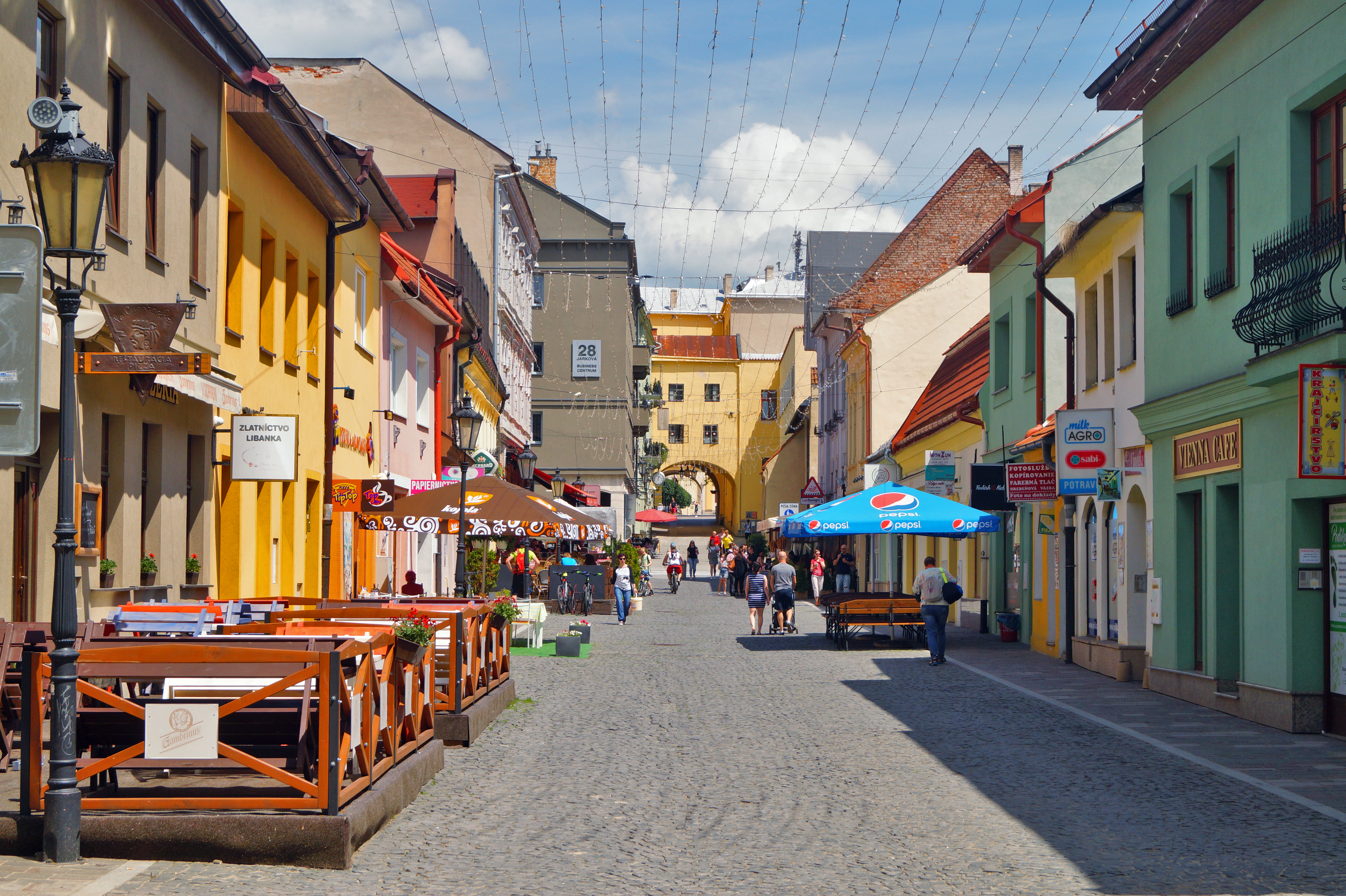
Floriánova street

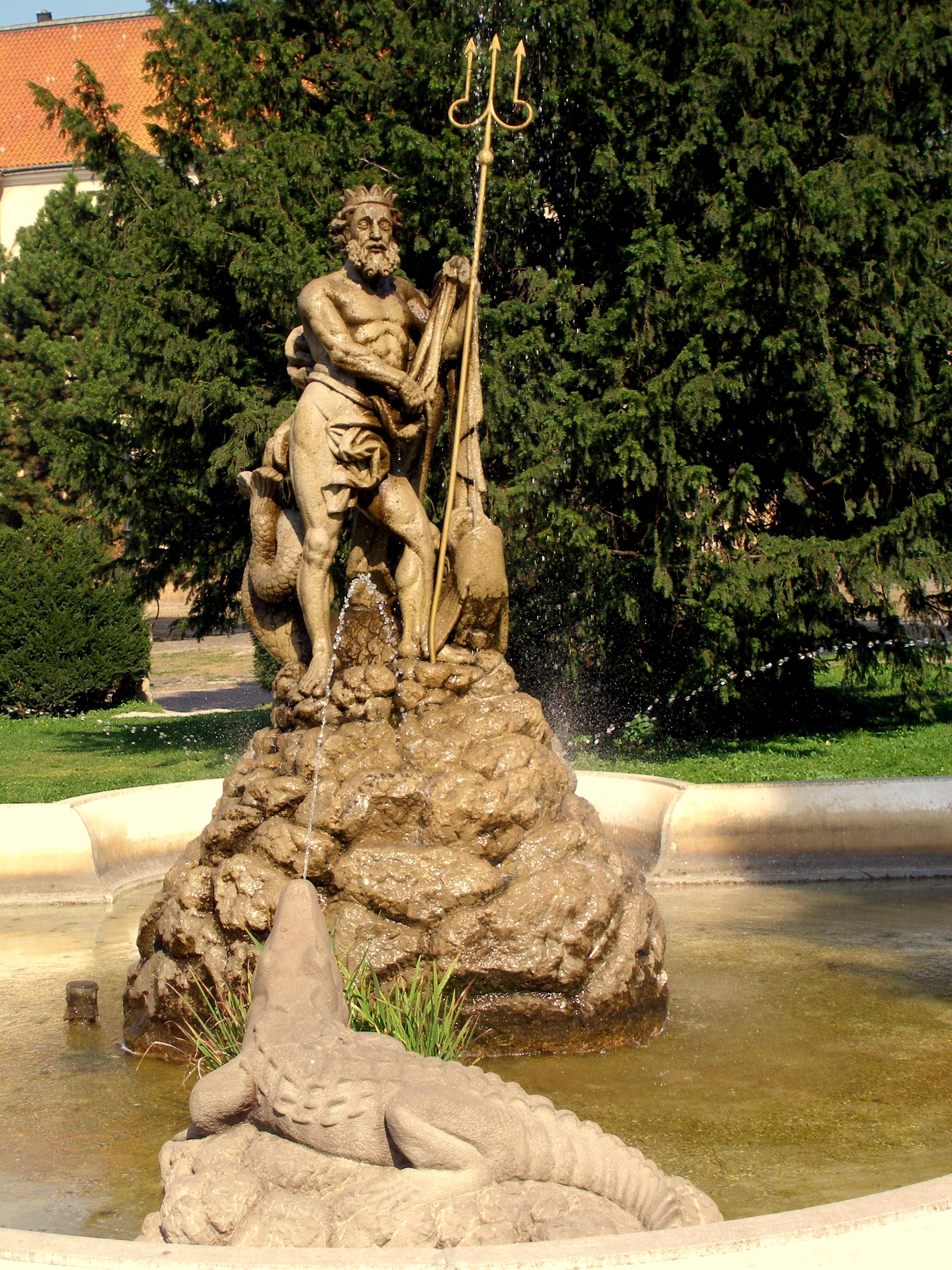
Neptune Fountain on Hlavná ulica (Main Street)

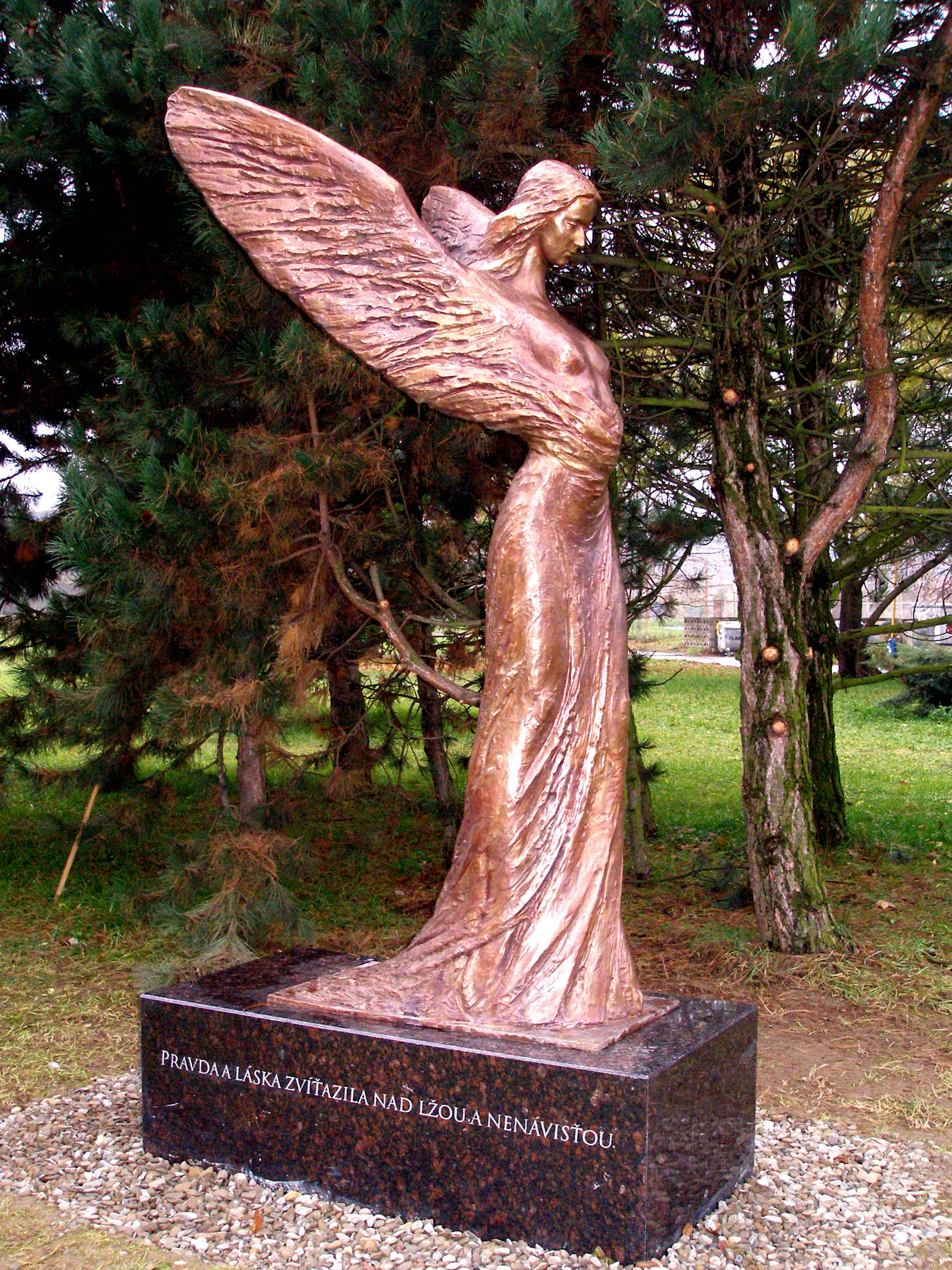
Memorial – Prešovská Sloboda (Prešov Freedom)

- Štátna vedecká knižnica (State Scientific Library)
- Park kultúry a oddychu (Culture and Recreation Park)
- Hvezdáreň a planetárium (Observatory and planetarium)
- Fontány a fontánky (Fountains and small fountains)
- Nové Divadlo Jonáša Záborského (New Jonáš Záborský Theater)
- Historické Divadlo Jonáša Záborského (Historical Jonáš Záborský Theater)
- Biely dom (sídlo PSK) (White House (PSK headquarters))
- Vyhliadková veža (Lesopark Prešov) (Observation tower (Prešov Forest Park))

=== Historical monuments ===
- Gréckokatolícka katedrála svätého Jána Krstiteľa (Cathedral of St. John the Baptist, which houses the remains of the Blessed Martyrs of Prešov Bishop Pavel Petr Gojdič and Vasil Hopek and a faithful copy of the Turin Canvas)
- Konkatedrála svätého Mikuláša (Co-Cathedral of St. Nicholas)
- Pravoslávny katedrálny chrám svätého kniežaťa Alexandra Nevského (Church of St. Alexander Nevsky)
- Bosákov dom (banka) (Bosák's house (bank))
- Caraffova väznica (galéria) (Caraffa Prison (gallery))
- Floriánova brána (Florian's Gate)
- Gotická brána (Gothic gate)
- Súsošie Panny Márie, Pomocnica kresťanov (Sculpture of the Immaculate Conception)
- Súsošie svätého Róchusa (Sculpture of St. Roch)
- Evanjelické kolégium (Evangelical College)
- Evanjelický a.v. chrám Svätej Trojice (Evangelical Church of the Augsburg Confession)
- Františkánsky kostol svätého Jozefa a františkánsky kláštor (Church of St. Joseph)
- Gréckokatolícky biskupský palác (Greek Catholic Episcopal Palace)
- Rákócziho palác - sídlo Krajského múzea (Rákóczi Palace – the seat of the Regional Museum)
- Palác Klobušických - sídlo Krajského súdu (Klobušický Palace – seat of the Regional Court)
- Tauthov dom (Tauth's house)
- Weberov dom (Weber's house)
- De Rossiho dom (De Rossi's House)
- Szyrmayiova kúria - sídlo Pravoslávnej bohosloveckej fakulty Prešovskej univerzity (Szyrmayi Curia – the seat of the Orthodox Theological Faculty of University of Prešov)
- Stará mestská škola (Old town school)
- Wierdtov dom - sídlo krajského pamiatkového úradu (Wierdt House – the seat of the regional monument office)
- Prešovská kalvária (Prešov Calvary – an important monument from the first half of the 18th century. Construction began in 1721 and was completed around 1752. The construction was led by the Jesuits, who administered the Roman Catholic parish. Calvary consists of 16 baroque chapels and a church in honor of St. Cross, which is built on the highest point)
- Historická radnica (Historic town hall)
- Židovská synagóga (Jewish Synagogue – it houses the Judaica Museum of the Jewish Culture of the Slovak National Museum in Bratislava (one of the most beautiful synagogues in Slovakia))
- Neologická synagóga na Konštantínovej ulici (Neological synagogue on Konštantínova street)
- Ústav Sancta Maria - sídlo gymnázia na Konštantínovej ulici (Sancta Maria Institute – the seat of the gymnasium on Konštantínova Street)
- Kumšt – originally a bastion, rebuilt into the Vodárenská bastion, Jewish Museum (1929–1939), since 1947 under the administration of the Regional Museum in Prešov
- Mlynský náhon a historická mestská elektráreň (Mill drive and historic city power plant)
- Kováčska bašta (Blacksmith's bastion)
- Františkánska bašta (Franciscan Bastion)
- Zvyšky mestského opevnenia (Remains of the city fortifications)
- Kostol sv. Donáta na Cemjate (Church of Donatus of Muenstereifel on Cemjata)
- Neptúnova fontána (Neptune Fountain)
- Divadlo Jonáša Záborského (Jonas Záborský Theater)
- PKO Čierny orol (Black Eagle Culture and Recreation Park)
- Divadlo Alexandra Duchnoviča - Palác Pulských (Alexander Dukhnovych Theater – Pulský Palace)
- Suchý mlyn (Dry mill)
- Národná kultúrna pamiatka Solivar (Solivar National Cultural Monument)
- Kostol sv. Štefana na Hrádku - Soľný hrad (Castrum Salis) (Church of St. Stephen on Hrádku – Salt Castle (Castrum Salis))
- Vodárenská veža (Water tower (currently a lookout tower))
- Renesančný kaštieľ (Renaissance manor-house)
- Farský kostol Najsvätejšieho mena Ježiš a Mária a kláštor františkánov (Parish Church of the Blessed Name of Jesus and Mary and Franciscan Monastery)
- Socha Krista v Rio de Janeiro na Trojici (Statue of Christ in Rio de Janeiro on Trojica)
- Socha Jána Pavla II. (Statue of John Paul II)
- Historický podzemný vodojem na Kalvárii (Historic underground reservoir on Calvary)
- Župný dom (County House, Prešov)

=== Castles ===
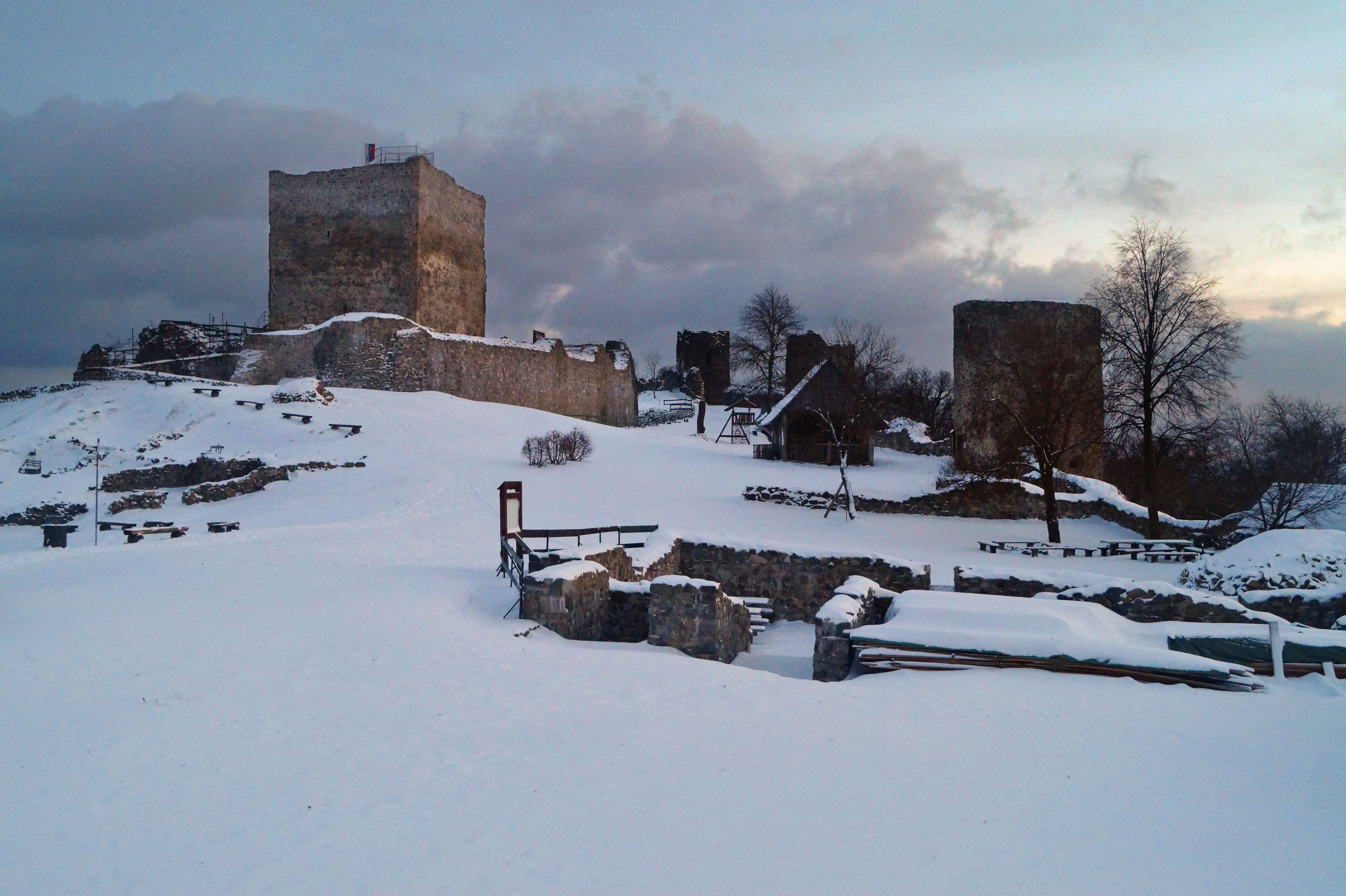
The area of Šariš Castle in winter

Prešov has the largest number of preserved castle ruins among all the regional towns in its vicinity, which led to the creation of the Prešov Castle Road project in 2019. The aim was to connect these castles with an imaginary tourist line and thus support the development of tourism in Prešov and its surroundings. 6 castles took part in the Prešov Castle Road project, namely:

- Šarišský hrad (Šariš Castle)
- Kapušiansky hrad (Kapušany Castle)
- Zbojnícký hrad (Zbojnícky Castle)
- Lipovský hrad (Lipov Castle)
- Obišovský hrad (Obišov Castle)
- Hrad Šebeš (Šebeš Castle)

=== Parks ===
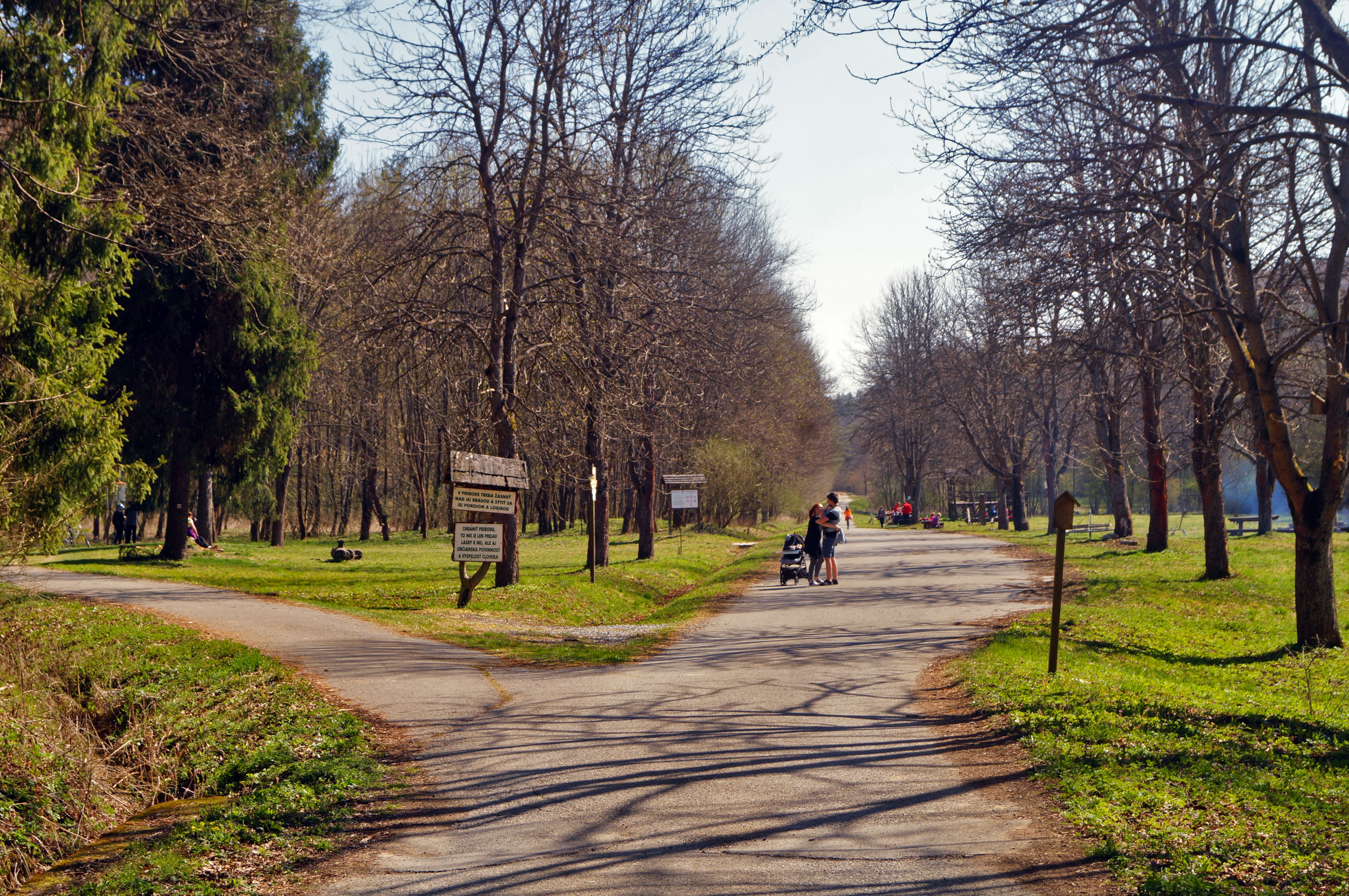
Cemjata Lesopark – Fermented water (Kvašná voda)

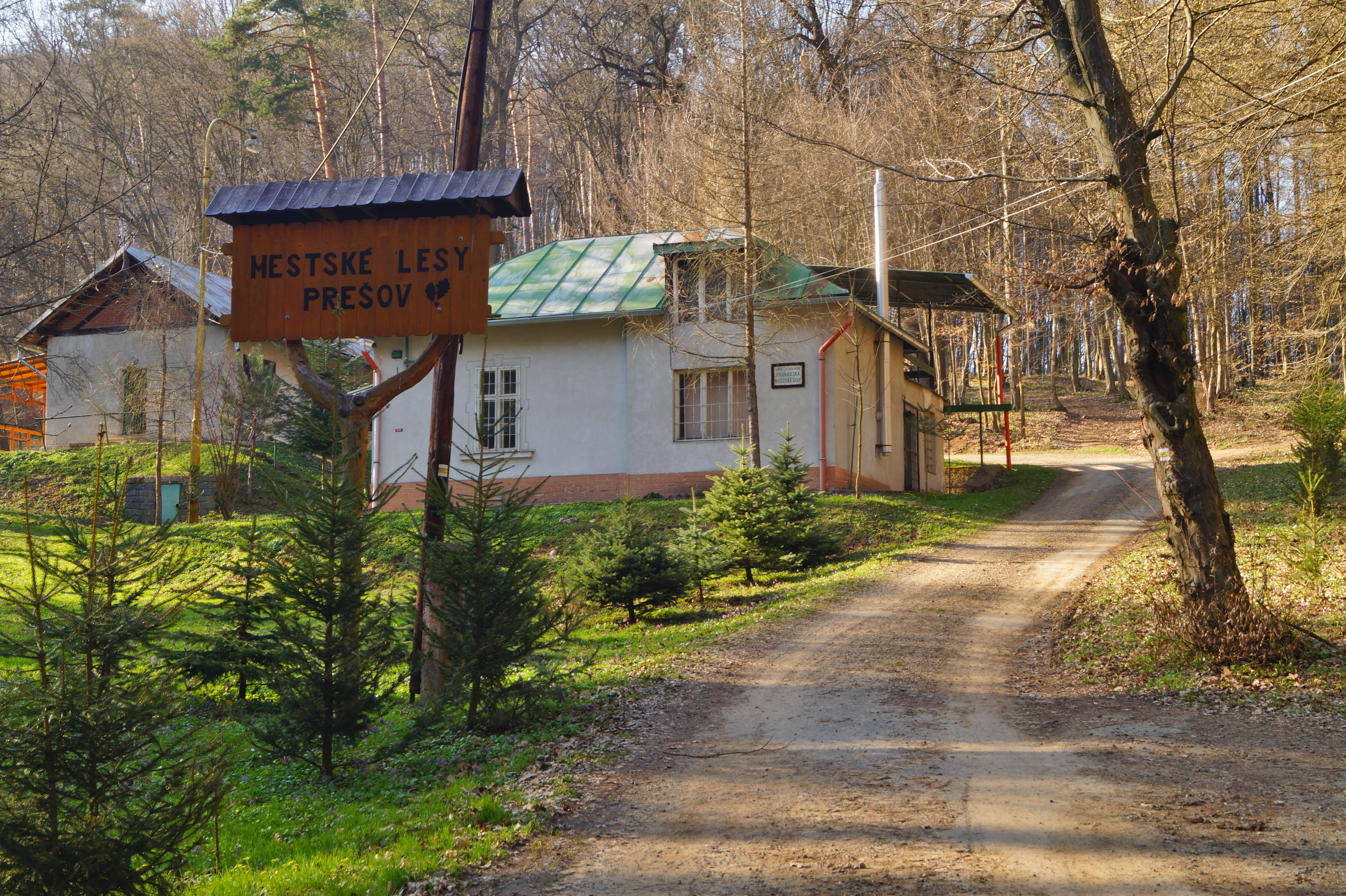
Borkút lesopark

The construction of a central city park, situated between the Sekčov housing estate and Táborisko, is being prepared. In addition to the planned central city park, there are several parks and parks in Prešov:

- Severný park (Northern Park – near Trojica, there is a sculpture of the Immaculate Conception)
- Južný park (South Park – Main (Hlavná) Street, includes a monument to the liberators and the Neptune Fountain)
- Garden of Art (Záhrada umenia) – Svätoplukova street
- Manor garden (Panská záhrada) – Nižná Šebastová
- Kolmanova záhrada (Kolman's garden)
- Sochársky park pri amfiteátri (Sculpture park by the amphitheater)
- Park sv. Jána Nepomuckého (St. John of Nepomuk Park) – Nižná Šebastová
- Park Námestie Legionárov (Legionary Square Park)
- Park Lesík delostrelcov (Park artillerymen's Lesík)
- Park Čierny Most (Black Bridge Park)
- Sekčov Park
- Clementisova Park
- Park Námestie mládeže (Youth Square Park)
- Zabíjaná Lesopark
- Cemjata Lesopark
- Borkút Lesopark

== Sports ==
=== Football ===
Prešov is home to one professional football team: 1. FC Tatran Prešov which is the oldest football team in Slovakia.

=== Ice hockey ===
The city's ice hockey club is HC Prešov. The home arena of Prešov is the ICE Arena, and it has a capacity of 3600 visitors. Prešov had a hockey team since 1928 (HC Prešov Penguins), but in 2019 it folded.

=== Handball ===
The city's handball club is HT Tatran Prešov, which is Slovakia's most popular and currently most successful club. The handball team of Prešov is taking part in the Slovak league and also in the international SEHA League with the best handball teams from the region. Many handball players from this team are also members of the Slovak national handball team.

=== Other ===
- City multipurpose sports hall
- Tatran Handball Arena (home stadium HT Tatran Prešov)
- Women's Handball Hall – Sídlisko II, by the river Torysa, near Kaufland
- ICE Arena (home stadium HC Prešov)
- University of Prešov Hall
- Velodrome Prešov
- Bike Center Prešov, Pumptrack and Dirt track, Sekčov

== Regular events ==
- Akademický Prešov – festival študentského umenia (Academic Prešov – student art festival)
- Turbanfest – festival alternatívnej hudby, divadiel a workshopov (Turbanfest – a festival of alternative music, theaters and workshops)
- Prešovská hudobná jar (koncerty vážnej hudby) (Prešov Music Spring (classical music concerts))
- Zlatý súdok – prehliadka karikaturistov z celého sveta (Golden Barrel – a show of cartoonists from around the world)
- Týždeň slovenských knižníc (Slovak Libraries Week)
- Deň Zeme (Earth Day)
- Večerný beh Prešovom (Evening run through Prešov)
- Šariš(ský) hackathon
- Prešov Half Marathon
- Lear Run
- Tour de Prešov – cyklomaratón (cycling marathon)
- Mikulášsky beh (St. Nicholas' run)
- Mikulášska nádielka (St. Nicholas' share)
- Deň soli (Salt day)
- Soľnobanský jarmok spojený s Medzinárodným dňom múzeí (Salt Fair, connected with the International Museum Day)
- Festival paličkovanej čipky (The bobbin lace festival – the international participation of bobbins – lasts 1 week. The first days are the courses of bobbin lace and by the end of the week, the event itself is connected with the demonstration of bobbin and the sale of everything related to this technique)
- Dobrý festival (Good festival)
- Festival zlej hudby (Bad music festival)
- Dni mesta Prešov (Days of the city of Prešov)
- Objavovanie Prešova (Exploring Prešov)
- Prešovský trojičný jarmok a festival skupín historického šermu a remesiel (Prešov Trinity Fair and festival of historical fencing and craft groups)
- Prešovské kultúrne leto (Prešov Cultural Summer)
- Pivný festival – jazdecký areál na Sídlisku III (Beer Festival – equestrian complex in Sídlisko III)
- Muvina – prehliadka vín (Muvina – wine show)
- Noc kostolov (Church Night)
- Prešovské trhy a parkúrové preteky (Prešov markets and parkour races)
- Prešovská hudobná jeseň (koncerty vážnej hudby) (Prešov Music Autumn (classical music concerts))
- JAZZ Prešov – Medzinárodný jazzový festival (JAZZ Prešov – International Jazz Festival)
- Jazz rock festival
- Súťaž mladých barmanov a čašníkov – EUROCUP (Young bartenders and waiters competition – EUROCUP)
- IMAGE – Módna prehliadka (IMAGE – Fashion Show)
- Opálové zrnko – súťaž podnikateľov (Opal grain – Entrepreneurs' Competition)
- Gorazdov literárny Prešov (Gorazd's literary Prešov)
- Farmárske trhy (Farmers markets)
- Prešovský študentský Liverpool – mladé hudobné talenty (Prešov Student Liverpool – Young musical talents)
- Vianočný salón – výstava prešovských výtvarníkov (Christmas Salon – exhibition of Prešov artists)
- Prešovské vianočné trhy (Prešov Christmas Markets)
- Silvester – spoločná oslava nového roka (New Year's Eve – a joint celebration of the New Year)
- Guitar Night
- Prešov číta rád (Prešov likes to read)

== Economy and infrastructure ==
=== Industrial parks ===
The following industrial parks and industrial zones are located in Prešov:

- Priemyselný park IPZ Prešov – Záborské (Industrial park IPZ Prešov – Záborské)
- CTPark Prešov juh (south)
- CTPark Prešov sever (north)
- Priemyselný park Záturecká (Záturecká Industrial park)
- Priemyselný park Grófske (Grófske Industrial park – under construction)
- Priemyselný areál Šalgovík (Šalgovík industrial area)
- Priemyselná zóna Budovateľská (Budovateľská Industrial zone)
- Priemyselná zóna Širpo (Širpo Industrial zone)
- Priemyselná zóna Delňa (Delňa Industrial zone)

=== Transport ===
==== Traffic ====
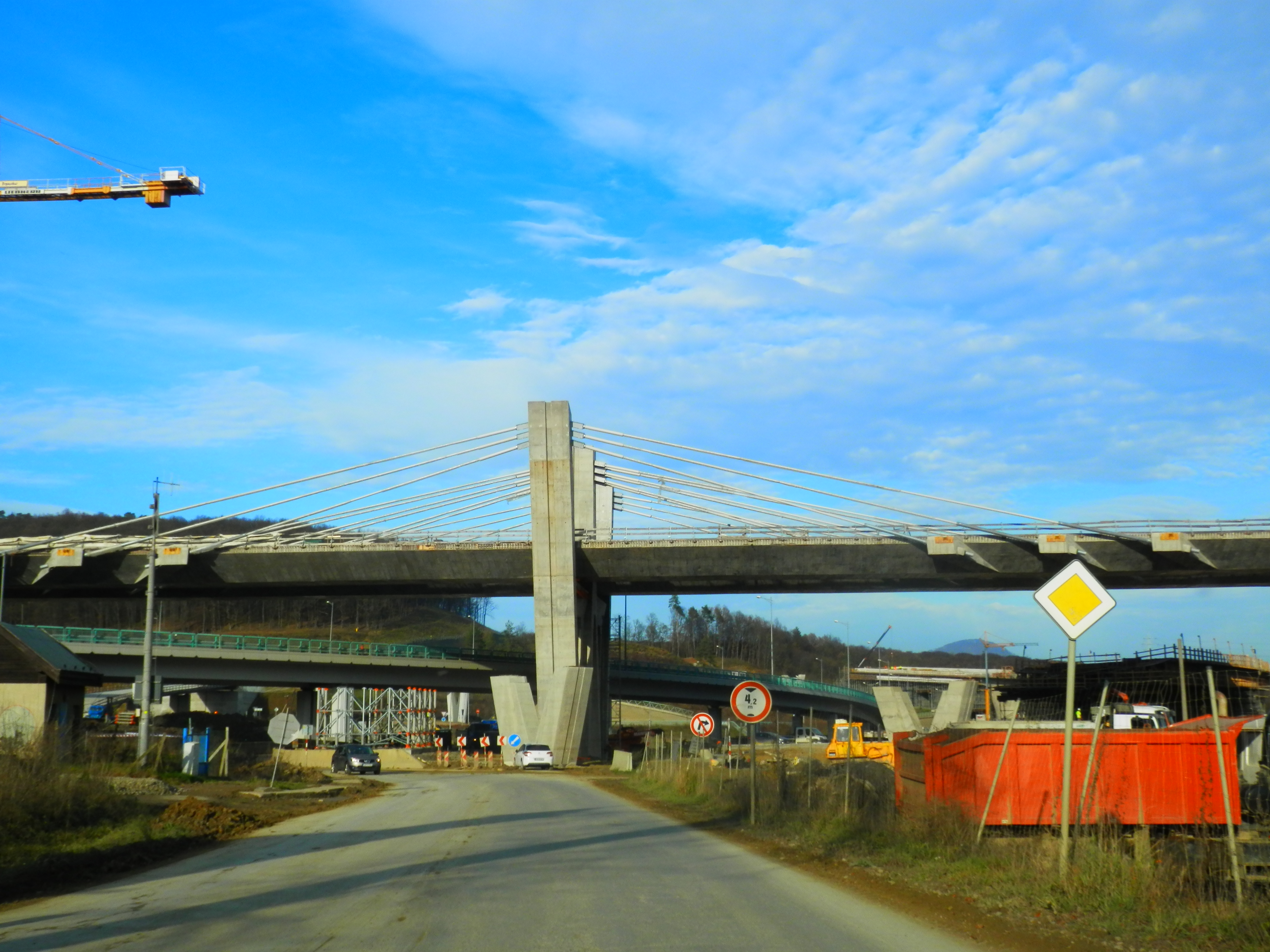
Construction of the southwestern bypass of Prešov

Prešov is connected by the D1 motorway to the south with Košice, to the west with Poprad and Ružomberok. The completion of its connecting sections enabling motorway connections to Bratislava and Žilina is expected in 2024. A high-quality connection with Poland via Svidník and Hungary is to be provided by the R4 expressway.

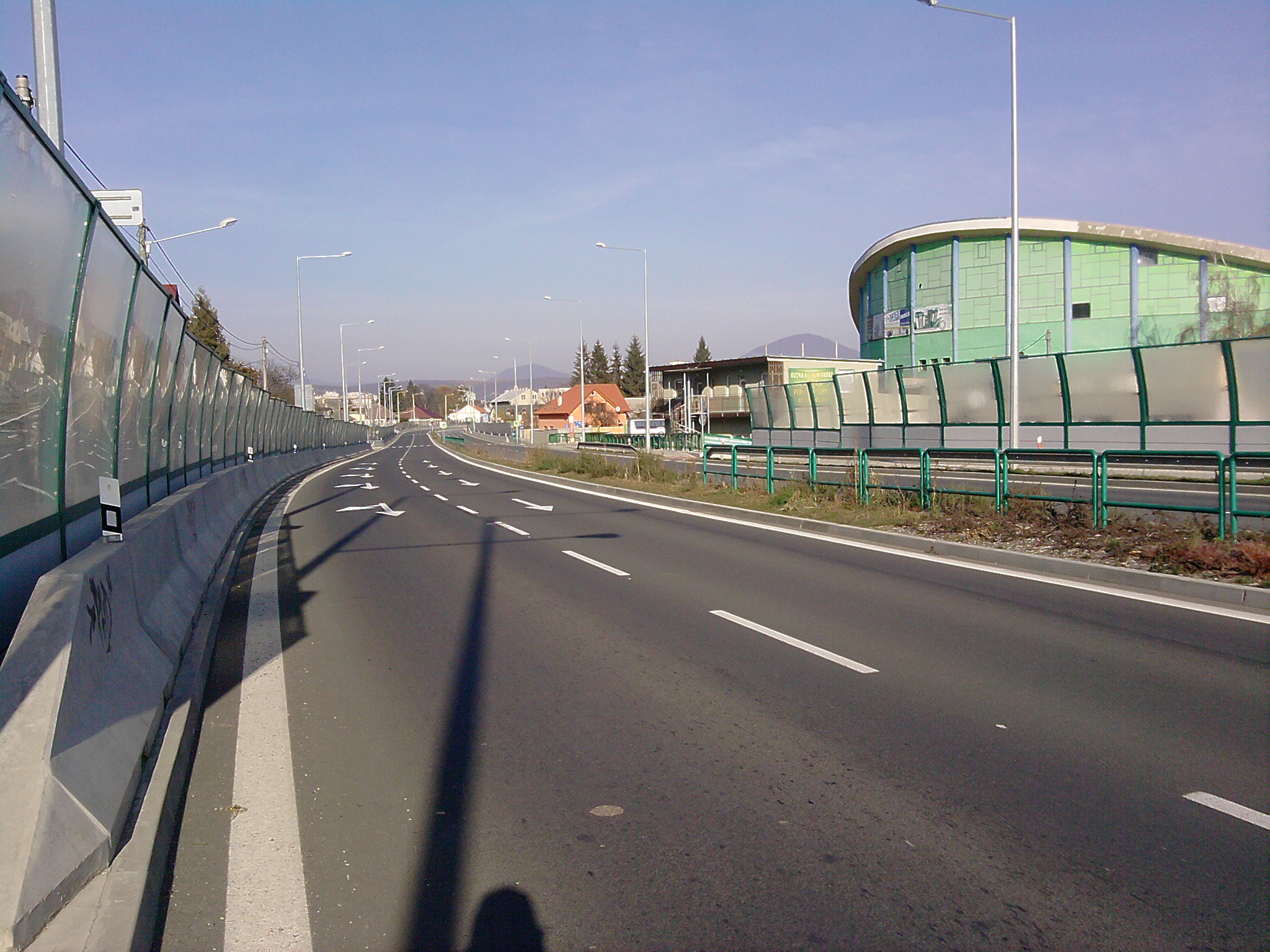
The inner bypass of Prešov, the so-called Waterfront communication

Today, Prešov has a southwestern motorway bypass, which has been under construction since 2017 and was officially opened on 28 October 2021. The southwestern bypass of Prešov forms part of the D1 motorway in the section Prešov – west and Prešov – south. Since 2019, the 1st stage of the northern bypass from the Prešov – West (Vydumanec) junction to the Prešov – North (Dúbrava) junction, which will be part of the R4 expressway, has been under construction. After the overall construction, the Prešov motorway bypass will bypass the whole city, divert transit traffic in all directions, and connect the D1 with the R4. It will start at D1 Prešov – South junction, continue towards the northwest, to the Prešov – West junction, where it will connect to the already completed parts of the D1 motorway. At this junction, the R4 will connect to D1. Completion of the construction of the 1st stage (PO west-PO north) of the northern bypass R4 is planned for the summer of 2023, and the 2nd stage (PO north-PO east) is now under the tender with planned opening in 2027.

International routes of European importance E50 and E371, first-class roads I/18, I/68, and I/20, and second-class road 546 pass through Prešov. In 2017, the last stage of the so-called Embankment communication (Nábrežná komunikácia) was finished, including the reconstruction of the intersection at ZVL, which relieved the city center of transit traffic.

==== City transport ====
Urban public transport is provided by the Transport Company of the City of Prešov (Dopravný podnik mesta Prešov, a. s.), which operates a total of 45 regular public transport lines by the following means of transport:

- trolleybuses (lines: 1, 2, 4, 5, 5D, 7, 8, 38)
- buses (daily lines: 10, 11, 12, 13, 14, 15, 17, 18, 19, 21, 22, 23, 24, 26, 27, 28, 29, 30, 32, 32A, 33, 34, 35, 36, 37, 39, 41, 42, 43, 44, 45, 46, night lines: N1, N2)

==== Vehicle fleet MHD ====
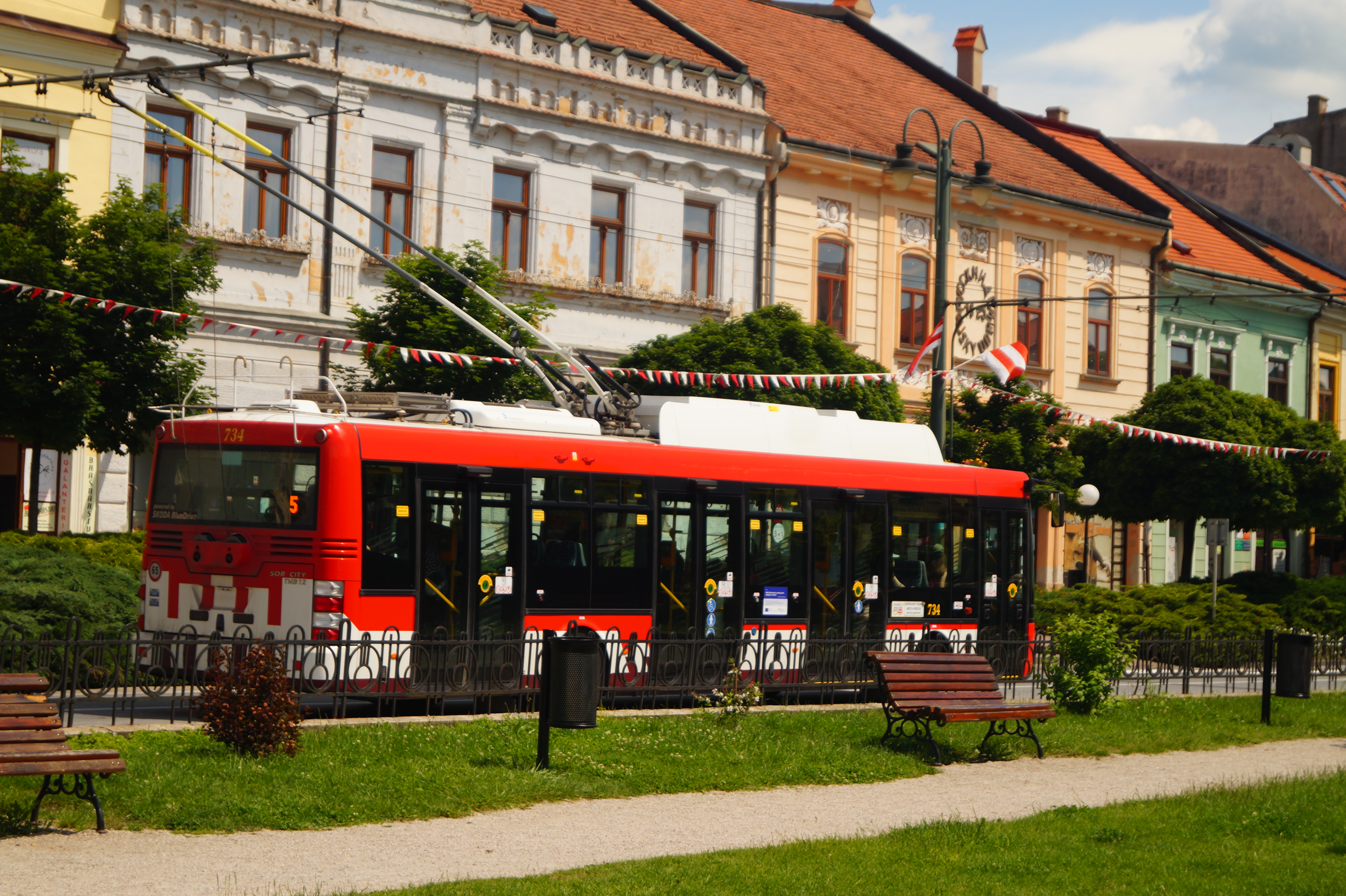
One of the newest types of trolleybuses in Prešov – Trolleybus Škoda 30Tr SOR

Today, the following vehicles are operated in MHD (Metská hromadná doprava – Public transport) Prešov:

- trolleybuses: Škoda 24 Tr Irisbus, Škoda 31 Tr SOR, Škoda 30 Tr SOR, SOR TNS 12, Škoda 27 Tr Solaris
- buses: Solaris Urbino 12, Irisbus Citelis 12M, Irisbus Citelis 18M, Iveco First FCLLI, SOR NB 12 City, SOR NB 18 City, Solaris Urbino 18, Irisbus Crossway LE 12M, SOR BN 10.5 (leased from DPB), SOR EBN 8

==== History of public transport ====
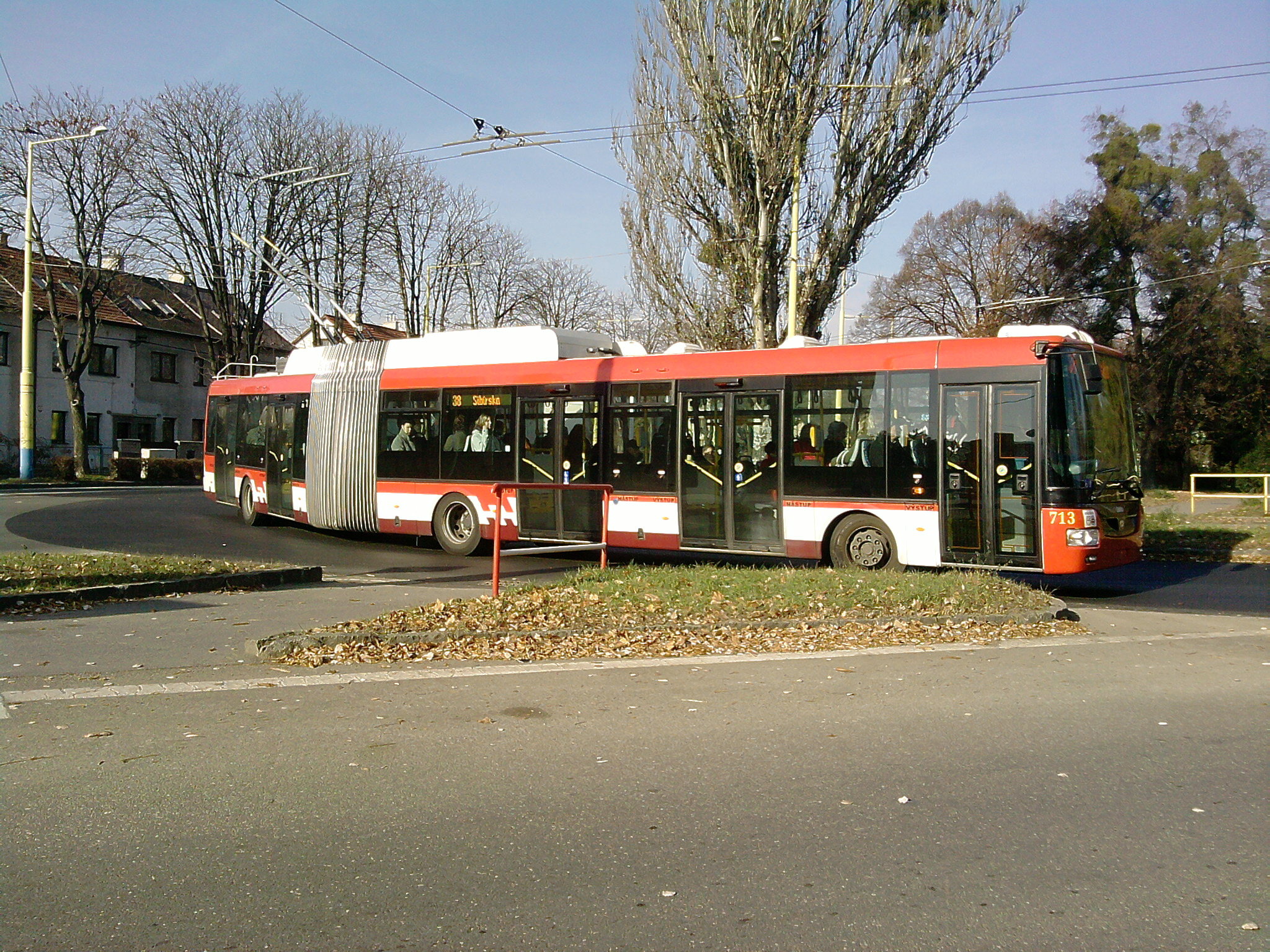
Trolleybus Škoda 31Tr SOR

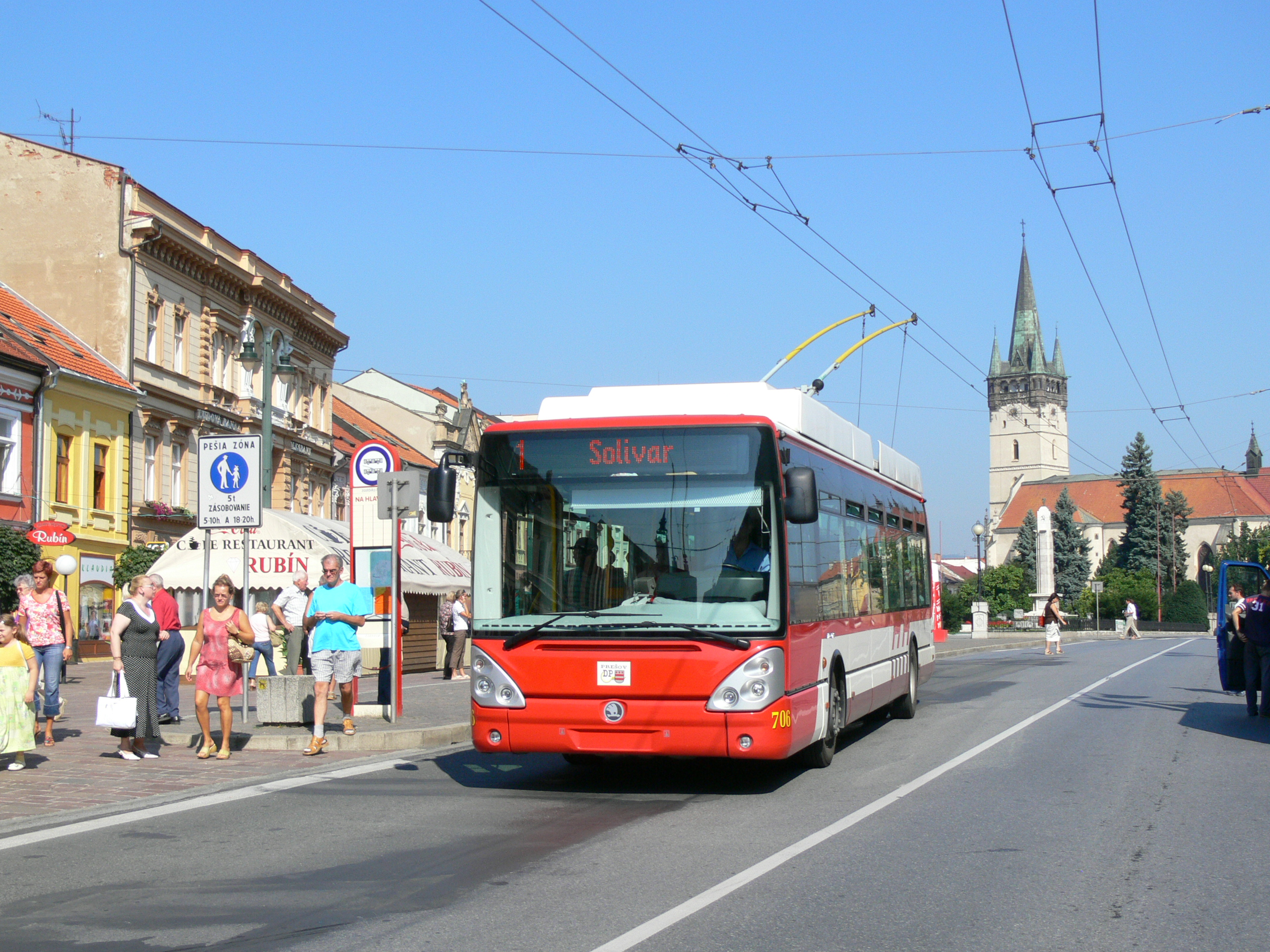
Low-floor trolleybuses have been running in Prešov since 2006. The Škoda 24Tr on Hlavná Street on line 1 goes on the oldest section of the track to the town of Solivar

The history of public transport in Prešov began in 1949, when Local Transport was established, a municipal enterprise of the city of Prešov, as the operator of regular public transport in the territory of Prešov. After the end of World War II, it was not possible to start public transport with a new vehicle fleet, so an offer was accepted for the purchase of older Tatra vehicles from public transport facilities in Prague, Plzeň, and Bratislava. The vehicles were initially parked in the courtyard of the old prison on Konštantínova street, where the company was also located.

On 4 September 1949, the traffic on the first lines was ceremoniously opened. Already in the first year of operation, the Prešov public transport buses went beyond the city limits to the municipalities of Šarišské Lúky, Nižná Šebastová, Haniska, and Solivar. The following year, the development of public transport continued with the introduction of additional bus lines. The state hospital, Záhrady, Sídlisko II, Budovateľská and Čapajevova street were all gradually connected to the public transport network in the 1950s, as well as other municipalities: the town of Veľký Šariš and its part Kanaš, Malý Šariš, Ľubotice, Fintice, Teriakovce and Záborské.

In 1959, the first night line began operating, and the company was located on its own premises on Petrovanská street, where it moved in 1951. In 1958, when the construction of the trolleybus network in the city was approved, it brought a new stage in the development of urban transport. All high-capacity intra-city lines were to be electrified, while bus transport was to remain ancillary. Line 1 was the first to be electrified, which led from Nižná Šebastová through Šarišské Lúky to Solivar. Although its construction was delayed by several technical problems, on 13 May 1962, passengers got to experience trolleybuses. A new depot for trolleybuses and buses was completed in Šarišské Lúky, where the entire vehicle fleet as well as the company's administration moved. Work on other sections soon began, so in 1966, trolleybuses were already running on Košická, Sabinovská, Budovateľská streets, and Gottwald, the present-day 17 November Street.

In the first half of the 1970s, the track along Sabinovská street was extended to Dúbrava, and trolleybuses also began to serve industrial Širpo. Other projects of lines to Sídlisko III, Šváby, Haniska, and Delňa could no longer be carried out. Under the influence of cheap oil, buses also began to gain ground in Prešov. Bus transport recorded a quantitative development, when buses also started to run to Táborisko, Šidlovec, Cemjata, Pod Kamennou baňou street, and Sídlisko III. In terms of quality, however, this mode of transport has struggled with constant difficulties such as the lack of vehicles, their low capacity, and breakdowns. These shortcomings were not gradually overcome until the late 1970s. Nevertheless, due to the non-construction of the trolleybus line to Sídlisko III, the service of which was crucial at that time, the buses fully prevailed.

The period of the turn of the 1970s and 1980s, when the possibilities of public transport were significantly limited by the lack of fuel, pointed to the suitability of trolleybus transport. Following a review at the government level, the electrification program was re-launched. Sídlisko III was the first to be connected to the trolleybus transport network in 1985. Trolleybuses achieved a majority share in public transport in the city of Prešov after 1992, when trolleybus transport was introduced to the largest housing estate, Sekčov. The issue of the tariff in Prešov has always been characterized by an ever-changing number of tariff bands, based on which the rates for individual journeys were set. In 1949, there were three fare zones, and it was possible to change to another vehicle on one ticket. In 1969, single-ticket transfers were canceled, and the number of bands was reduced to two. Since 1984, the government has simplified the tariff, and there has been no division of the network into bands.

Different fares for travel to neighboring municipalities were reintroduced in 1993 and existed until 1996. Special rates also applied in 1997 – 99 and again in 2000. Tickets were originally bought from the guide directly in the vehicle, later sold by the driver, respectively a ticketing machine was installed in the vehicle. In 1977, the sale of tickets outside the vehicle was introduced. Since 1995, it has again been possible to buy a ticket from the driver, but at an increased price. Public transport is improved by the gradual renewal of the vehicle fleet, focused on low-floor vehicles, the introduction of computer technology into traffic management, as well as the reconstruction of track sections of the trolleybus track and overhauls of vehicles. In the future, it is planned to expand ecological trolleybus transport to the Šváby housing estate and the second connection of the city center and the Sekčov housing estate along Rusínská Street.

==== Rail transport ====
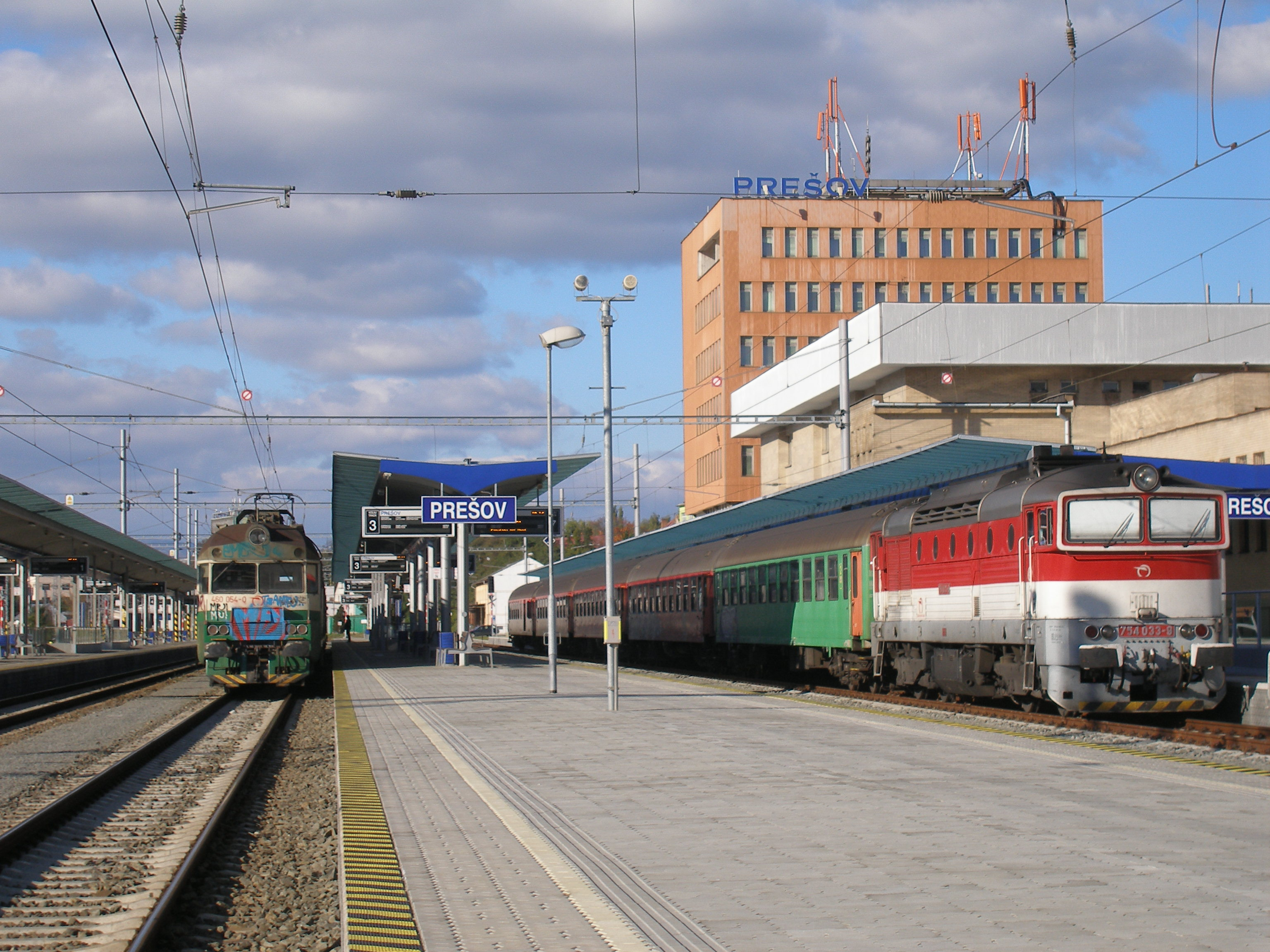
Prešov railway station

Three railway lines, Košice – Muszyna with a connection to Poland, the line Prešov – Humenné and Prešov – Bardejov pass through the city. The length of the railway network in the city is 16.7 km (10.4 mi). In 2007, the main railway station in Prešov was modernized, and in 2019, the pre-station area was reconstructed, including the underpass under Masarykova street, as well as MHD (Public transport) stops.

The following railway stations and stops are located in Prešov:

- Železničná stanica Prešov – Hlavná stanica (Prešov railway station – Main station)
- Železničná zastávka Prešov – mesto (Prešov railway stop – city)
- Železničná stanica Šarišské Lúky (Šarišské Lúky railway station)
- Železničná stanica Prešov – Nižná Šebastová (Prešov railway station – Nižná Šebastová)

As part of the integrated transport project, the construction of other railway stops in the city is also planned.

==== Bus transport ====
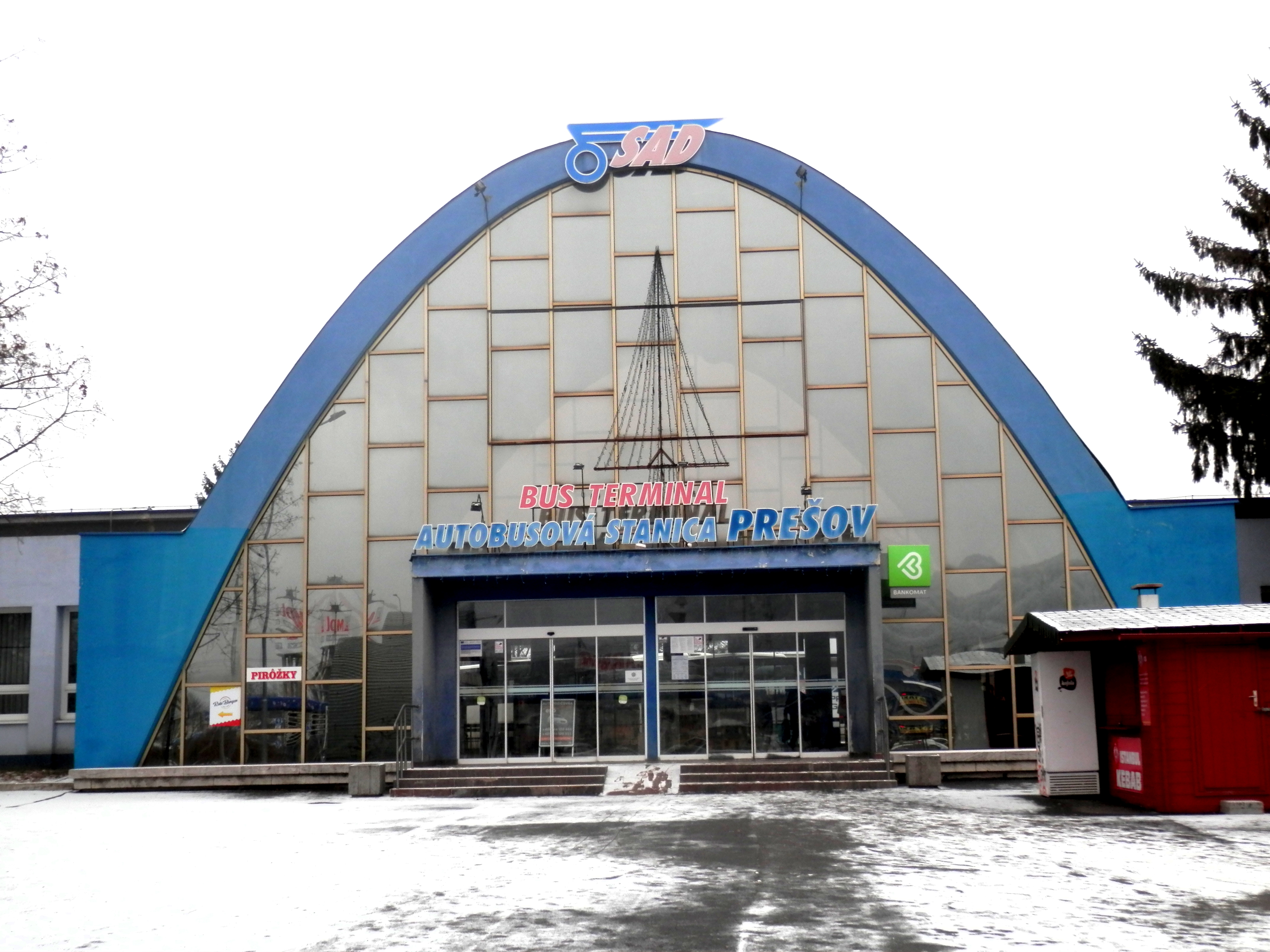
Prešov bus station

The main bus transport operator in the Prešov self-governing region is the company SAD Prešov, a.s., which provides suburban, long-distance, and international transport. Suburban transport is performed on 63 bus lines serving the districts of Prešov, Bardejov, Sabinov, Svidník, Košice-okolie, Košice, Vranov nad Topľou, Stropkov, Stará Ľubovňa, and Levoča. The main transport terminal in Prešov for the bus service is the Prešov Bus Station. SAD Prešov, a.s., in addition to the performance of suburban, long-distance, and international transport, also ensures the performance of public transport in Bardejov.

==== Air transport ====
There is currently no public civil airport in Prešov. There is an air base in the Nižná Šebastová district.

==== Bicycle transport ====
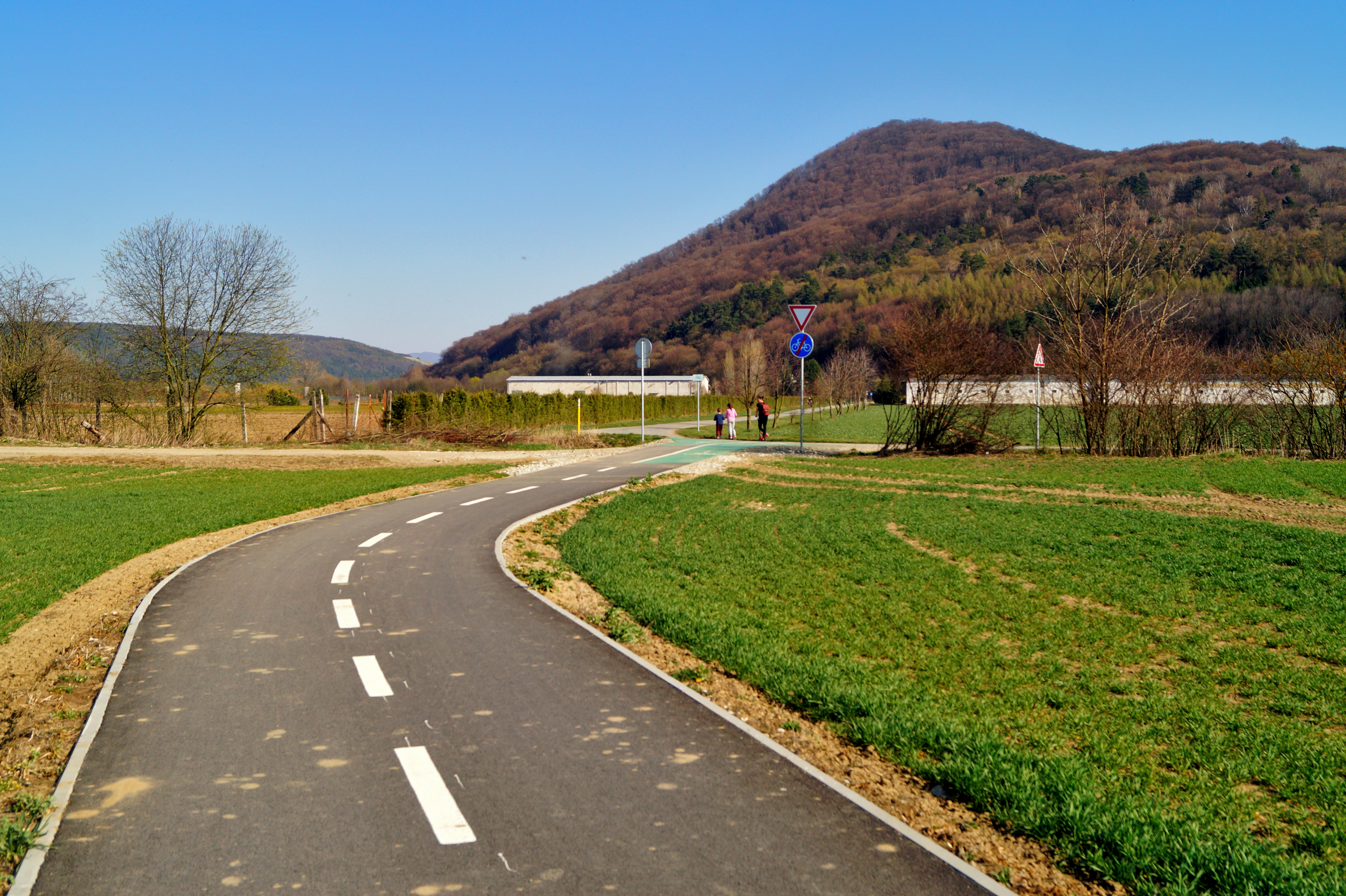
International cycle route EuroVelo 11

The international cycle route of European significance EuroVelo 11 leads through the functional territory of the city of Prešov, which passes through the cadastres of the municipalities of Veľký Šariš, Prešov, Haniska, and Kendice. The route is a part of the General Cycling Route as branch H1 – the main cycling route and belongs to the strategic goals of the Prešov self-governing region, as the main axis of the region. Currently, within the framework of EuroVelo 11, a continuous cycle route is in operation on the route Wilec hórka – City Hall – Sídlisko II – Sídlisko III – Veľký Šariš – Šarišské Michaľany. A part of this route is also a bicycle bridge under the Šariš Castle with a historical look, which has become a new sought-after attraction. Another important cycling route is the so-called cycle railway leading from Solivar in Prešov to the Sigord recreational area.

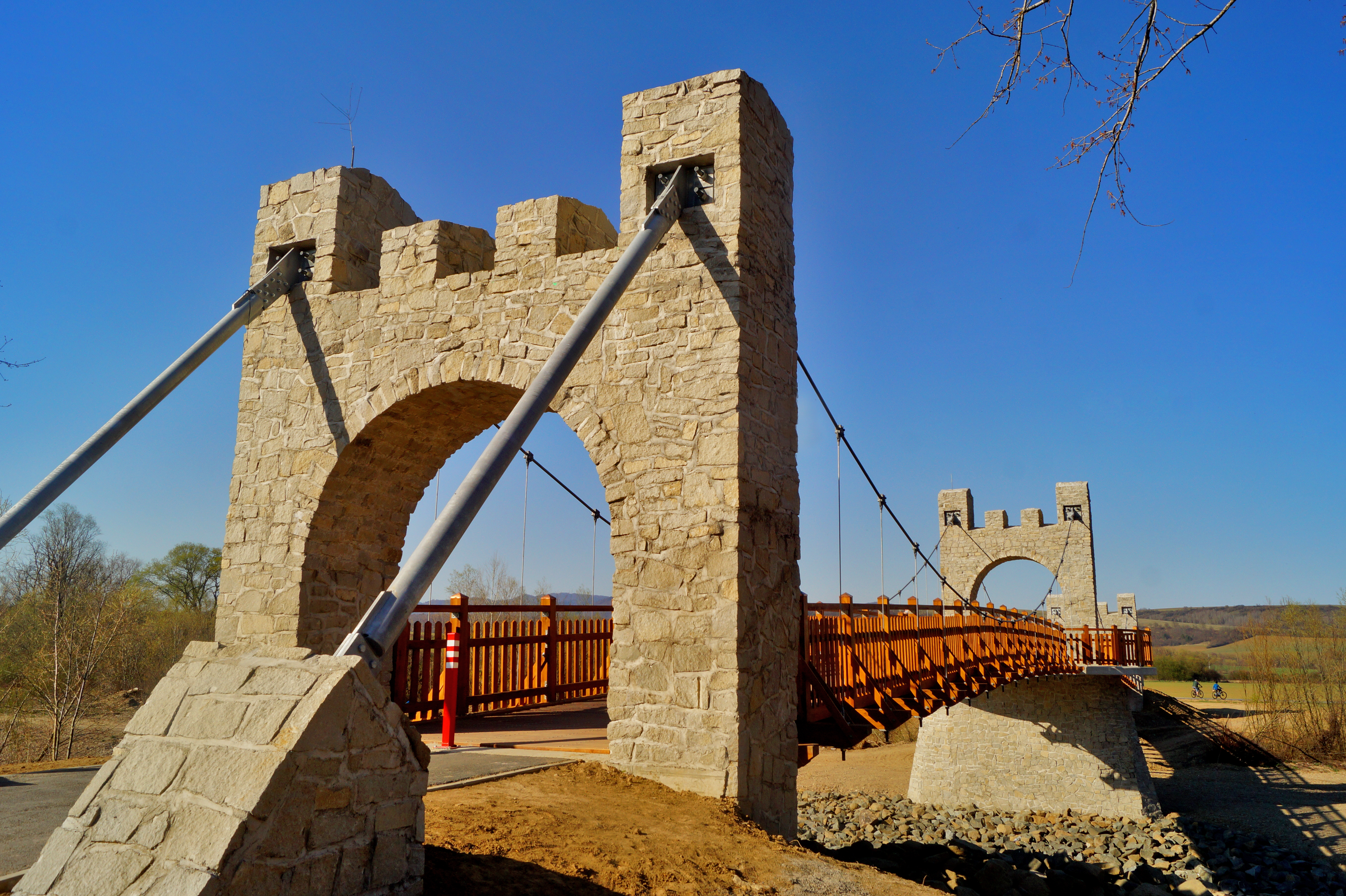
Bicycle bridge under Šariš Castle

In addition to these important cycle routes, there are several other local cycle routes in Prešov in various parts of the city. So far, the newest cycle routes in Prešov are the cycle route on Masarykova street, completed in 2019, and the Mlynský náhon cycle route, completed in 2020. Their completion was ensured by the cycling connection of Sídlisko III with the city center and with the Sekčov and Šváby housing estates. In 2020, a new cycle route was also completed in the Sekčov housing estate on the route from Laca Novomeského street to Šalgovík. For lovers of mountain biking, there are Prešov singletracks available in the Prešov forests, which together form eight routes of varying difficulty with a total length of approximately 20 km (12 mi). Prešov singletracks are one of the most attractive cycling areas in Prešov and its surroundings. They are well-marked and maintained in excellent condition. The routes lead through Malkovská hôrka, to the recreation center Cemjata (Kyslá and Kvašná voda), to Borkút, and it is also possible to get to the Calvary in Prešov.

== Healthcare ==
The largest providers of health care in Prešov are the following public and private facilities:

- Fakultná nemocnica s poliklinikou J. A. Raimana Prešov (University Hospital with J. A. Raiman Polyclinic Prešov)
- Vojenská nemocnica (Military hospital)
- Všeobecná nemocnica Oáza (Oáza General Hospital)
- Poliklinika Prešov (Polyclinic Prešov)
- Poliklinika ProCare Prešov (Polyclinic ProCare Prešov)
- Nemocnica svätej Alžbety (St. Elizabeth Hospital)
- Analyticko-diagnostické laboratórium a ambulancie (AdLa) (Analytical-diagnostic laboratory and outpatient clinics)
- Sofyc Clinic – klinika jednodňovej chirurgie (Sofyc Clinic – one-day surgery clinic)
- Gynstar – jednodňová starostlivosť v odbore gynekológia a pôrodníctvo (Gynstar – one-day care in the field of gynecology and obstetrics)

In addition to these facilities, medical services are also provided by other smaller clinics and health centers.

== Education ==
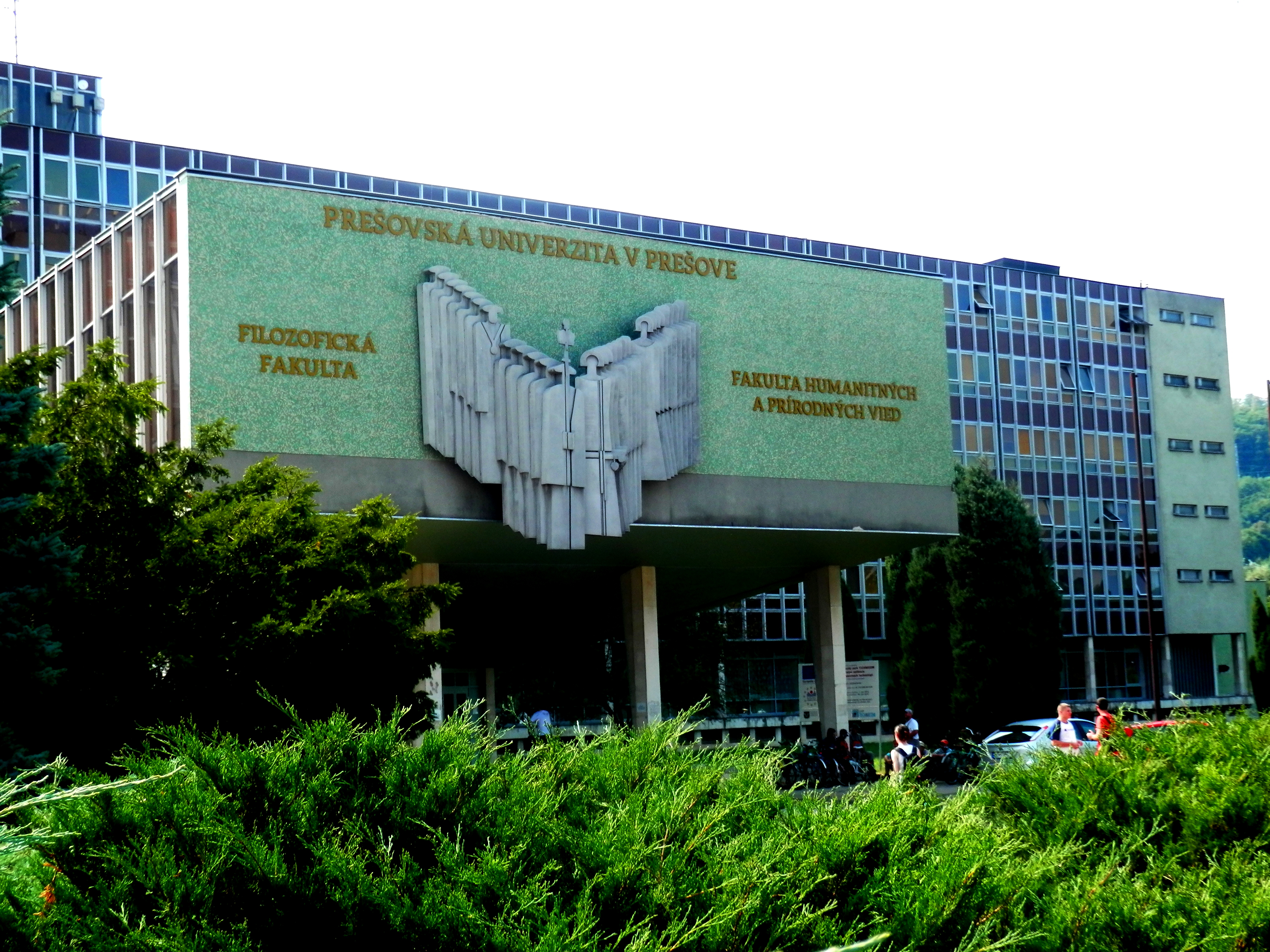
Faculty of Arts, University of Prešov in Prešov

Institutions of tertiary education in the city are the University of Prešov with 12,600 students, including 867 doctoral students, and the private International Business College ISM Slovakia in Prešov, with 455 students. In addition, the Faculty of Manufacturing Technologies of the Technical University of Košice is based in the city.

There are 15 public primary schools, six private primary schools and two religious primary schools. Overall, they enroll 9,079 pupils. The city's system of secondary education consists of 10 gymnasiums with 3,675 students, 4 specialized high schools with 5,251 students and 11 vocational schools with 5,028 students.

== Business ==
There are several business (shopping) centers in Prešov. EPERIA Shopping Mall has taken its name according to the historic city name Eperies. It is located at the river bank Sekčov, between the "Hobby park" at the west side (with DIY chain store HORNBACH) and STOP SHOP point from south side. Total shopping area of all three units is approximately 140.000 m^{2} (1,506.95 sq ft). ZOC MAX is also located in Sekčov. NOVUM Shopping Mall in the very heart of city centre with 33.000 m^{2} (355.21 sq ft) is the second largest. There are also ZOC Koral, Solivaria SC and the nearby Ľubotice Retail Park, with an additional area together of c. 40.000 m^{2} (430.56 sq ft).

One of the most popular locations in Prešov is Plaza Beach Resort. It is an exotic place in a cozy and calm city area, consisting of a luxury hotel with a restaurant and outside swimming pools. The resort has been built in a Mediterranean style.

== Hiking trails ==
- European walking route E8
  - Prešov – Miháľov – Kurimka – Dukla – Iwonicz-Zdrój – Rymanów-Zdrój – Puławy – Tokarnia (778 m) – Kamień (717 m) – Komańcza – Cisna – Ustrzyki Górne – Tarnica – Wołosate

== Twin towns – sister cities ==
Prešov is twinned with:

- Brugherio, Italy
- Gabrovo, Bulgaria
- Keratsini, Greece
- La Courneuve, France
- Mukachevo, Ukraine
- Nowy Sącz, Poland
- Nyíregyháza, Hungary
- Pittsburgh, United States
- Prague 10 (Prague), Czech Republic
- Remscheid, Germany
- Rishon LeZion, Israel
- Malatya, Turkey

== Panorama ==
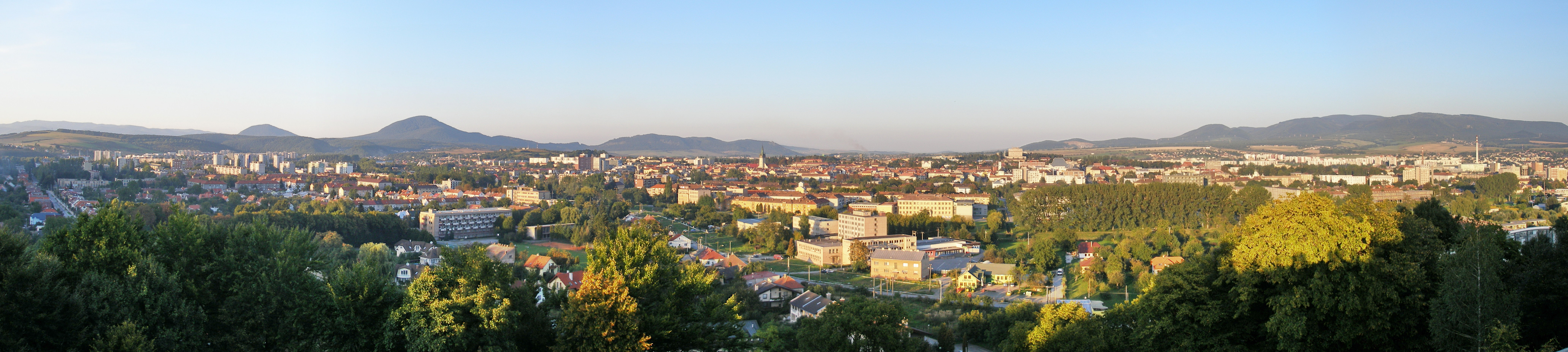
View from Calvary (2006)

== Gallery ==
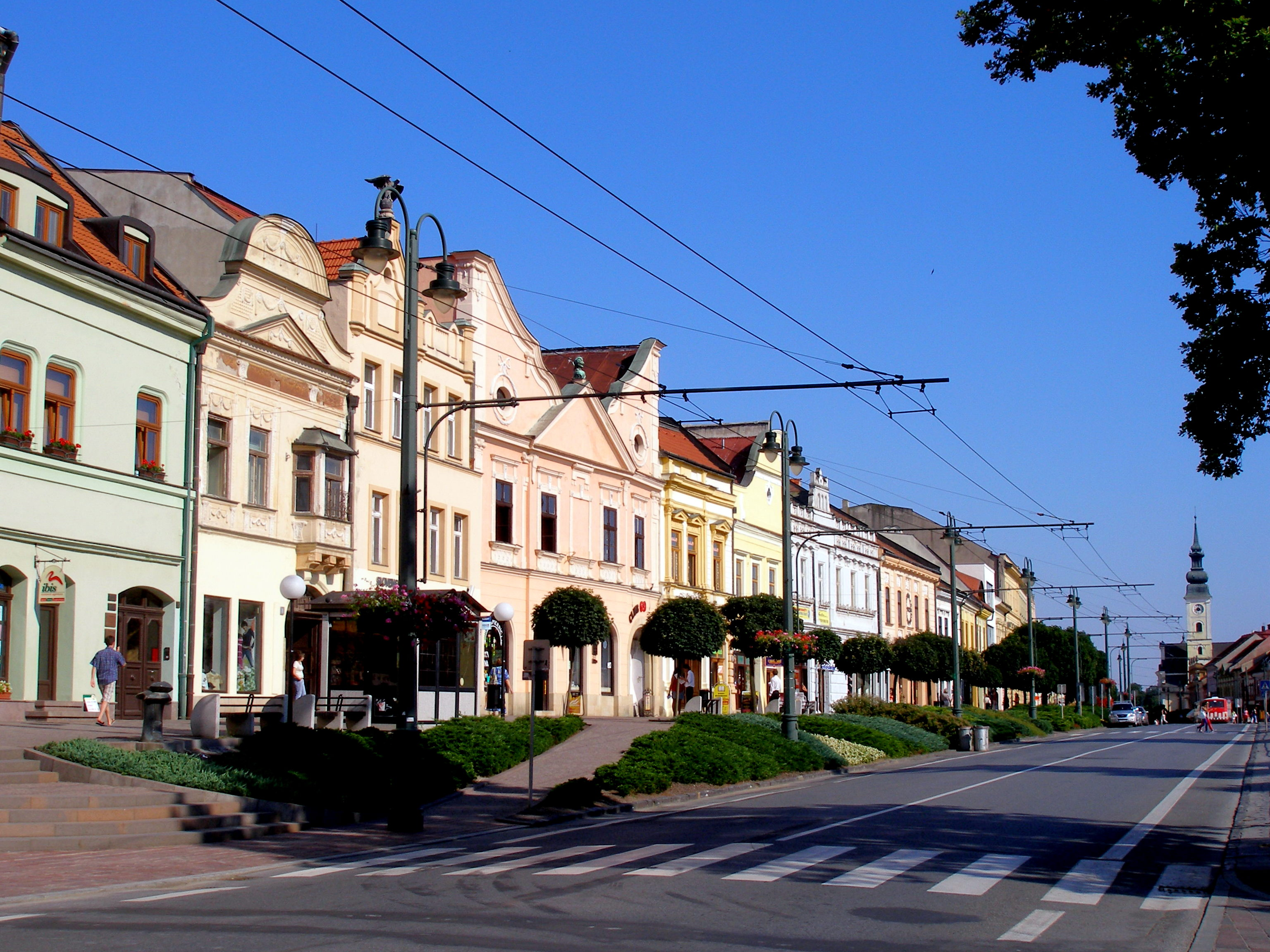
Main Street

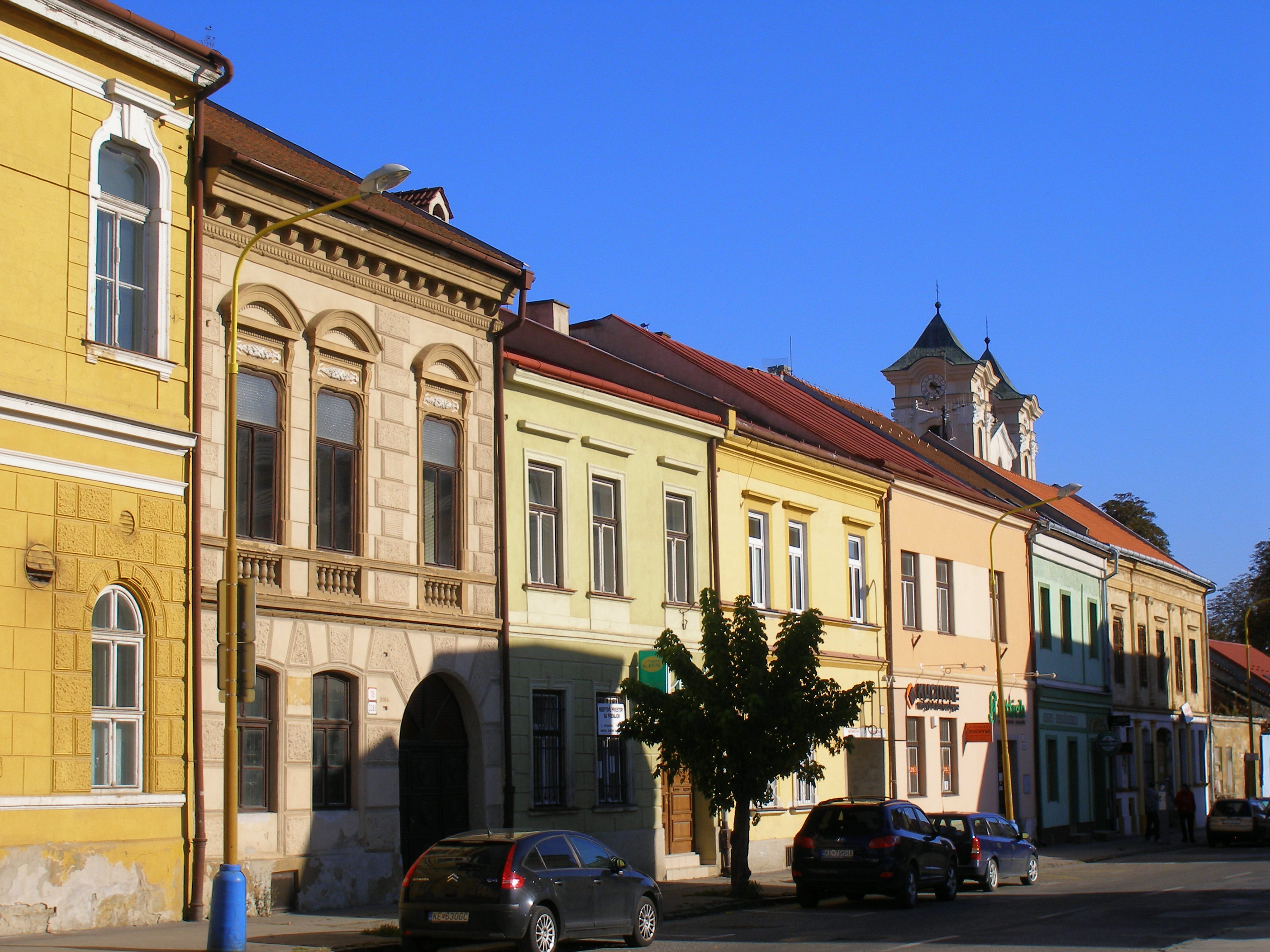
Slovak street

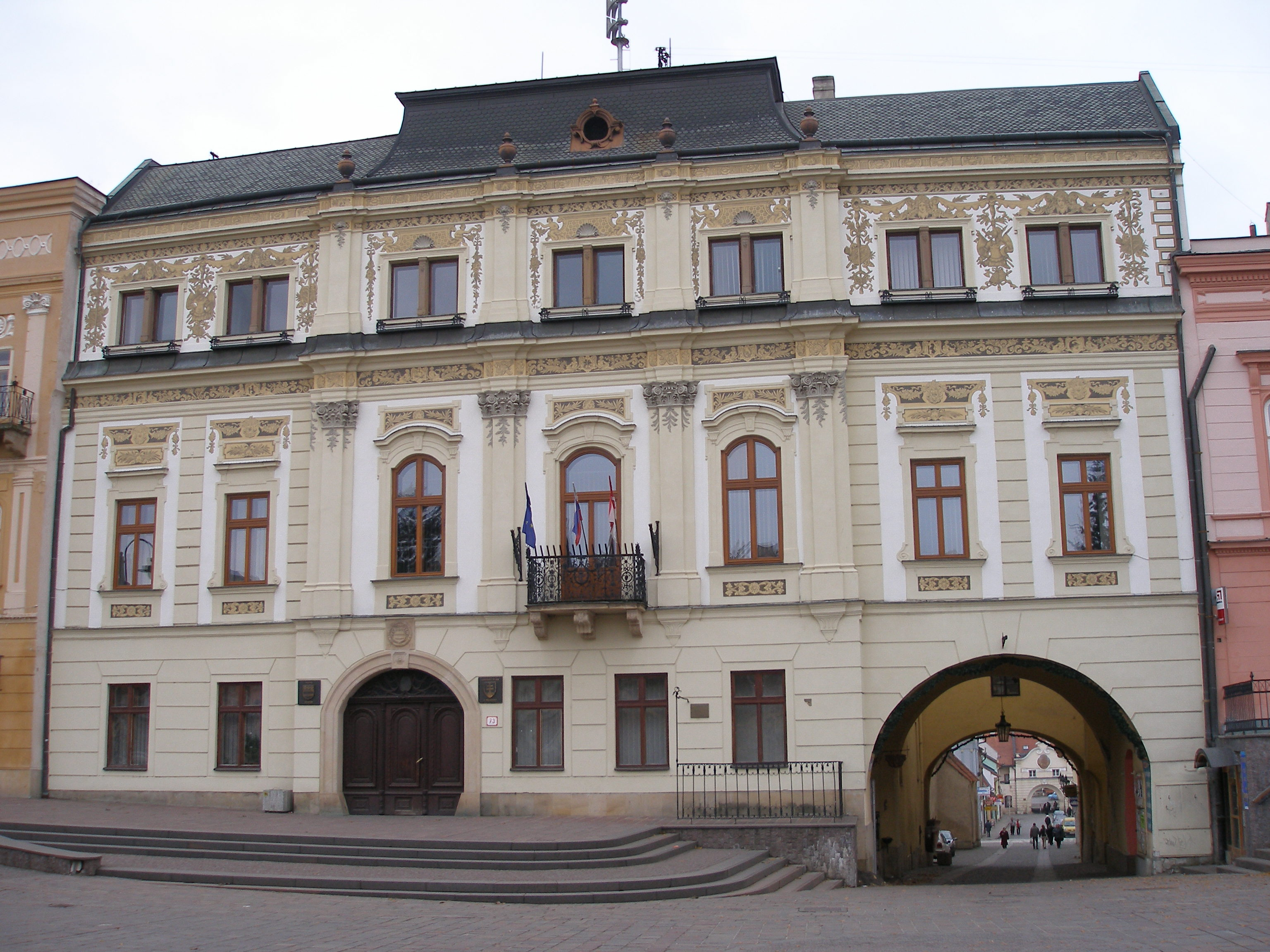
Town hall

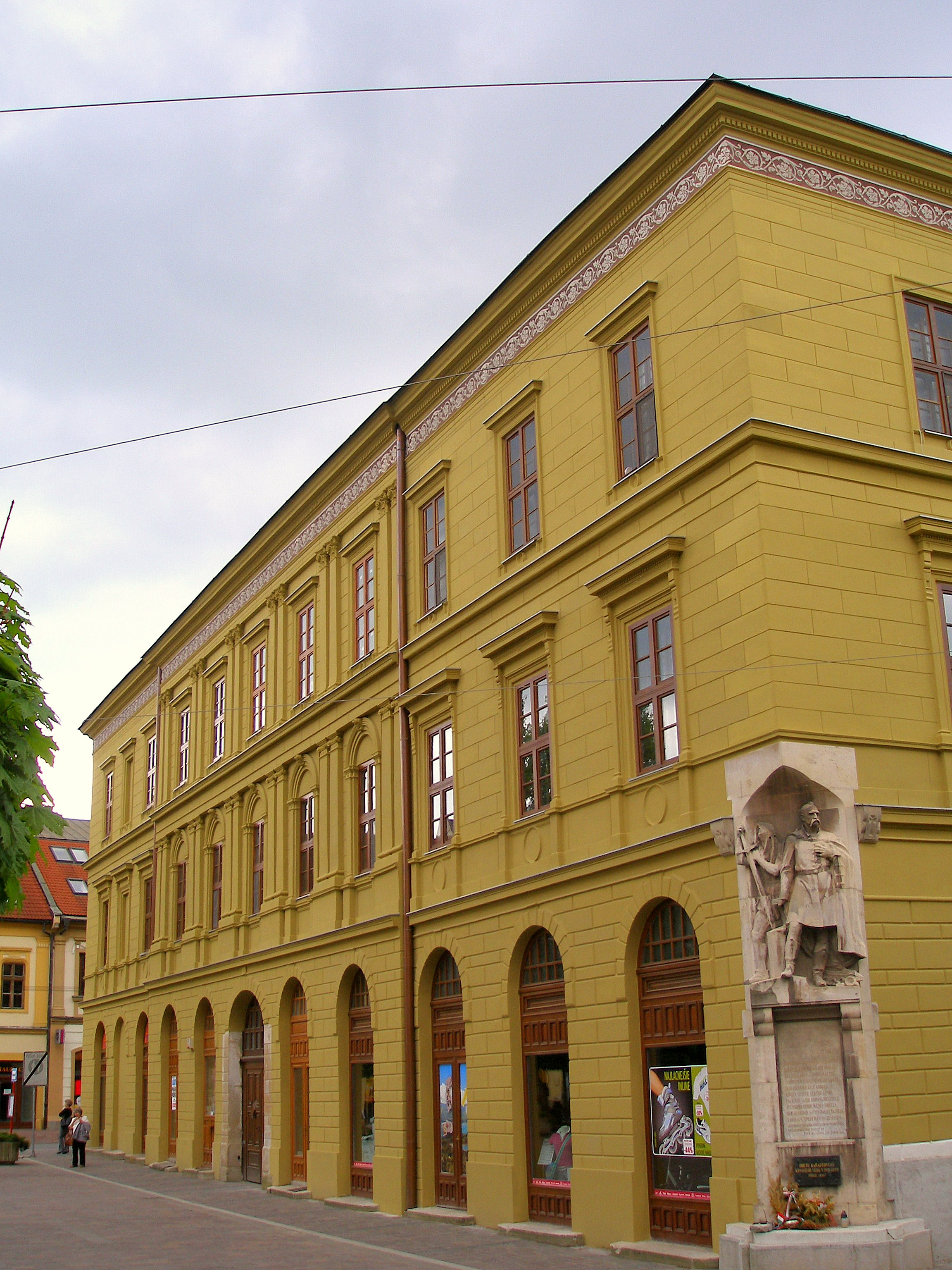
Historical building of the college

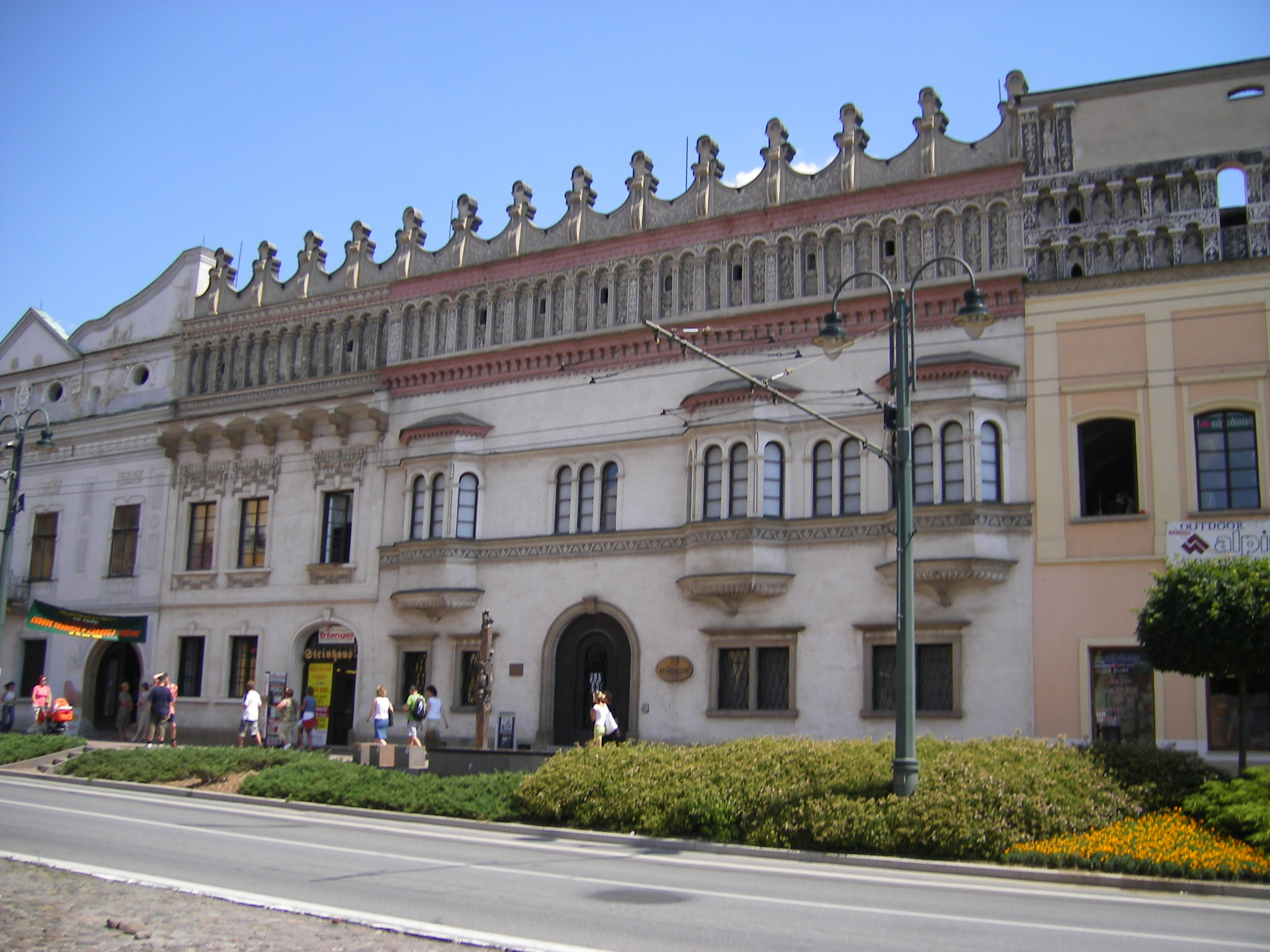
Renaissance House Sigismund Rákóczi

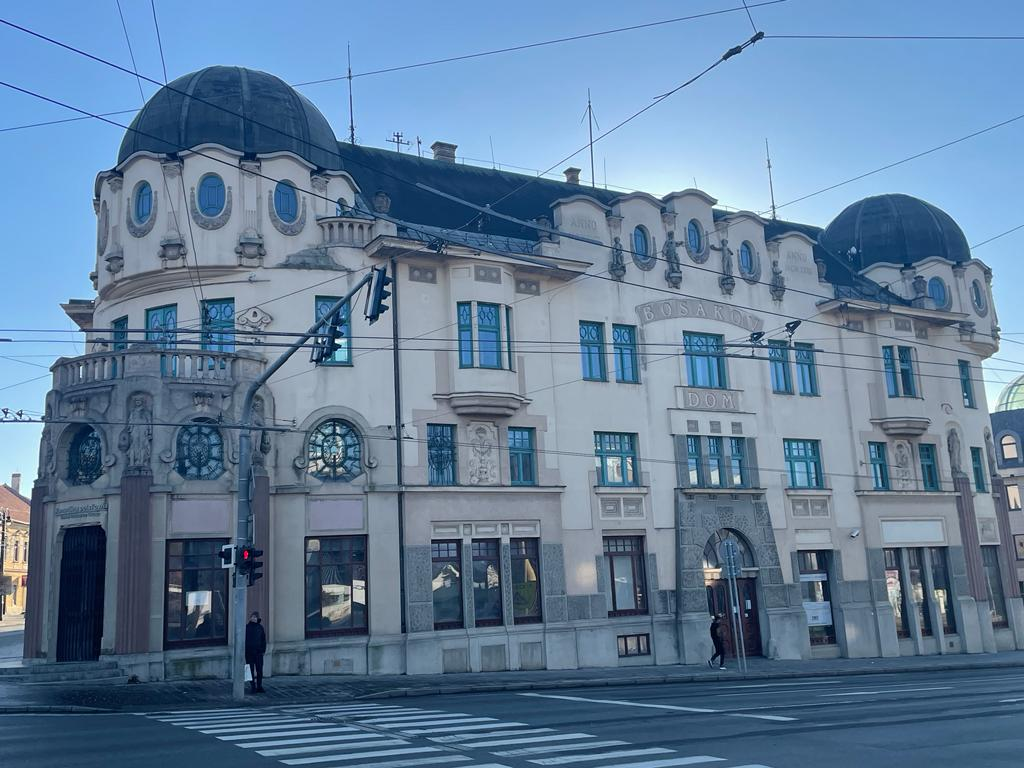
Bosák's house

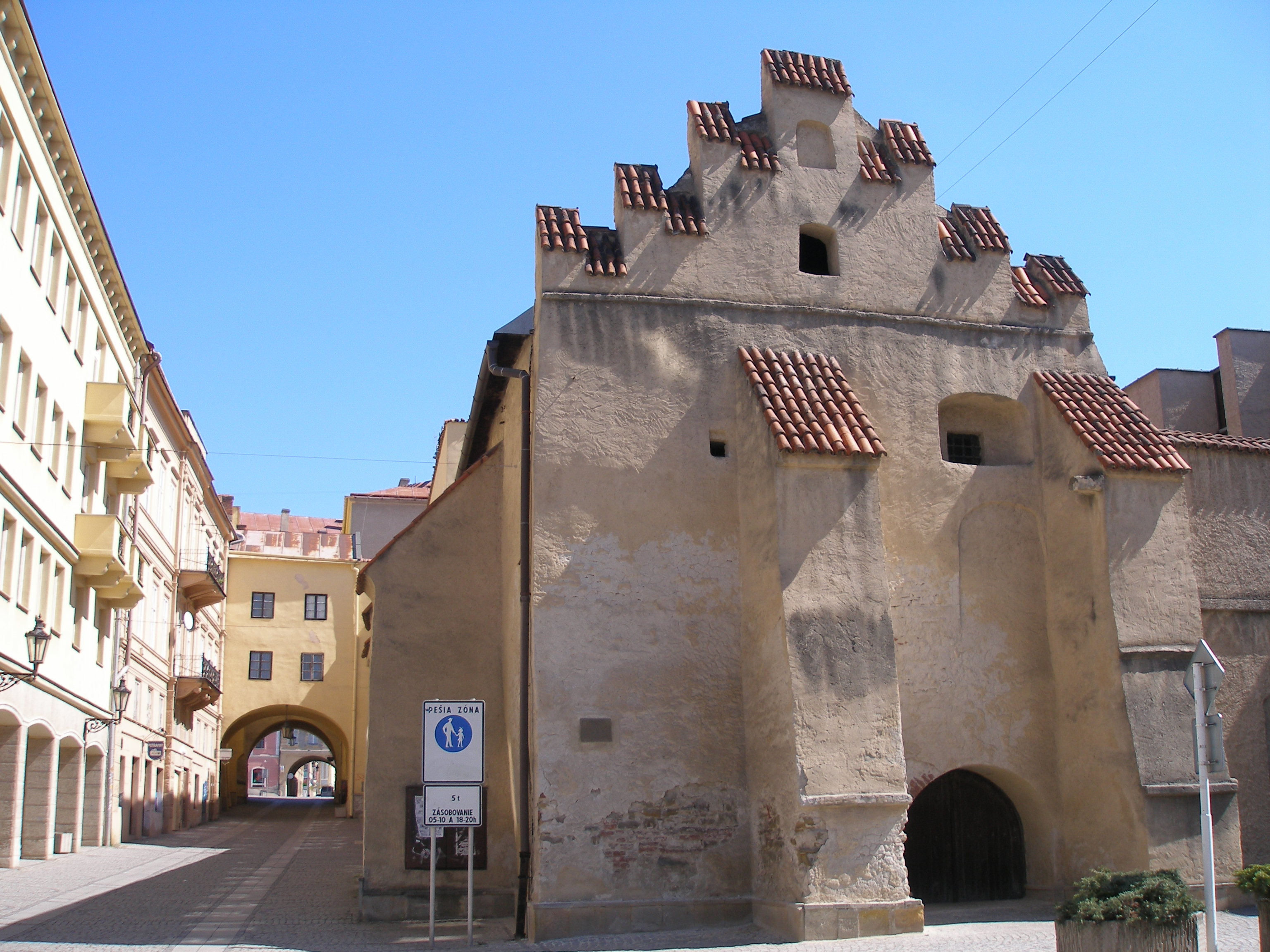
Late Gothic Caraffa prison

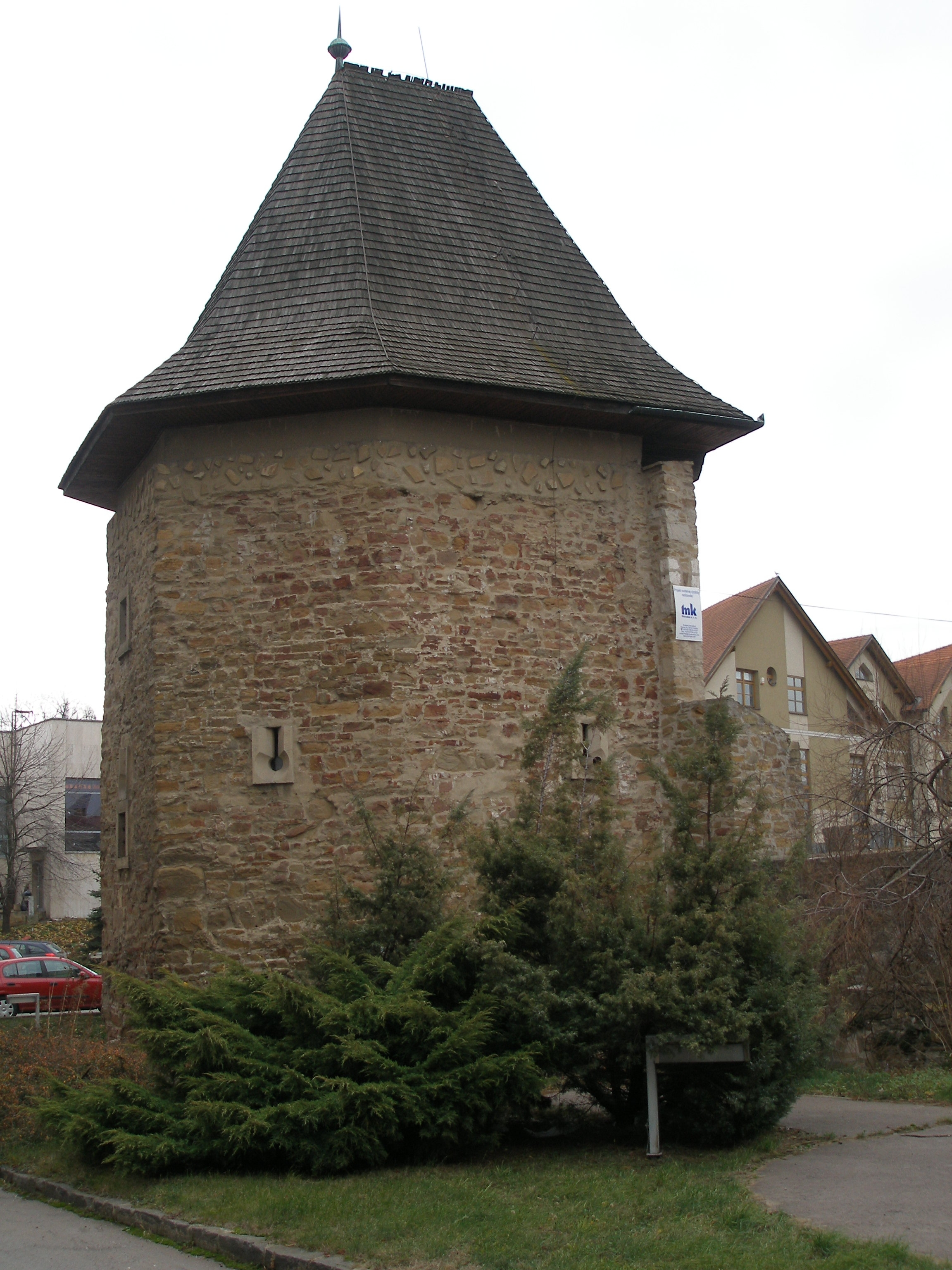
Blacksmith bastion

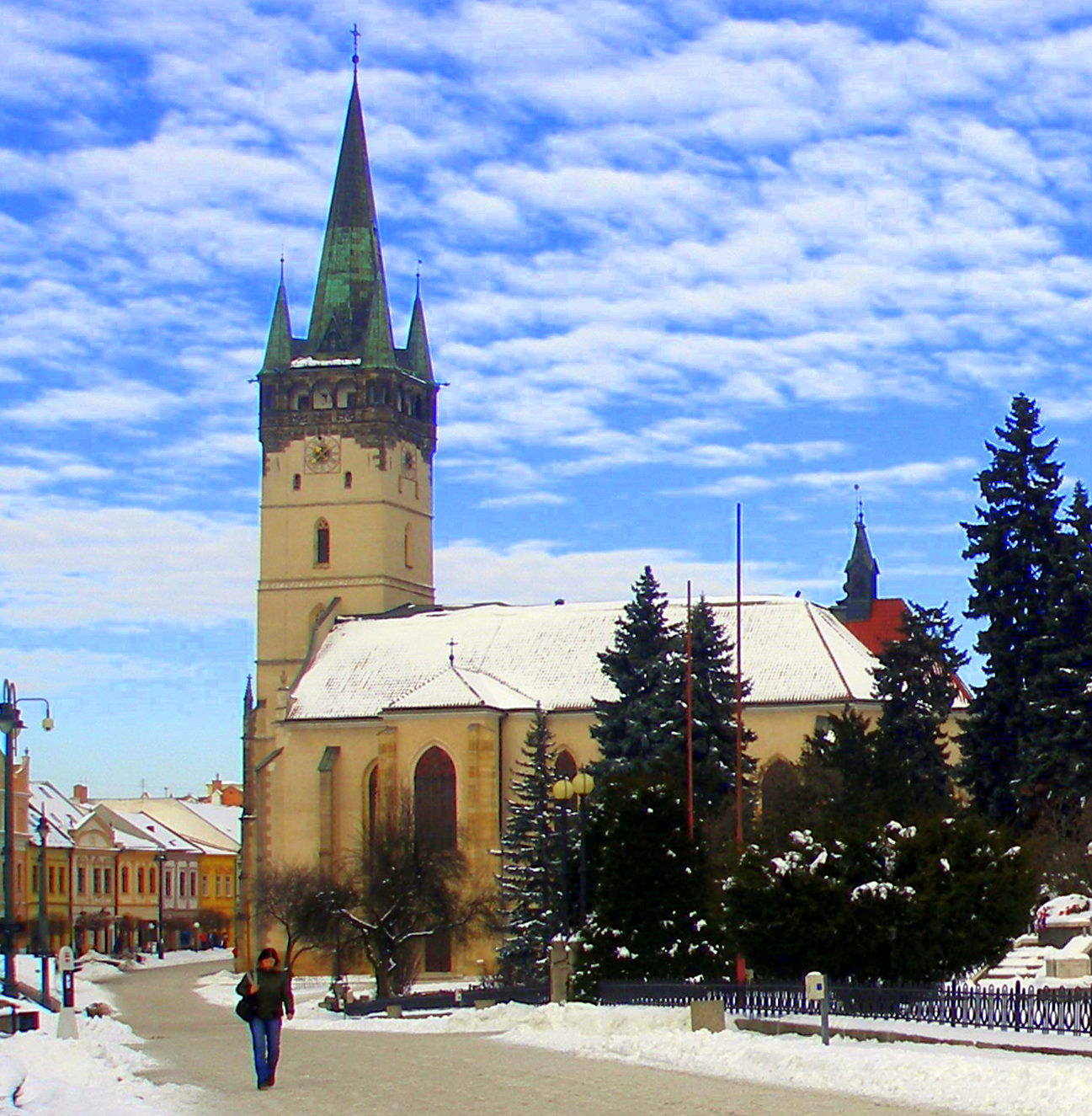
Cathedral of St. Nicholas

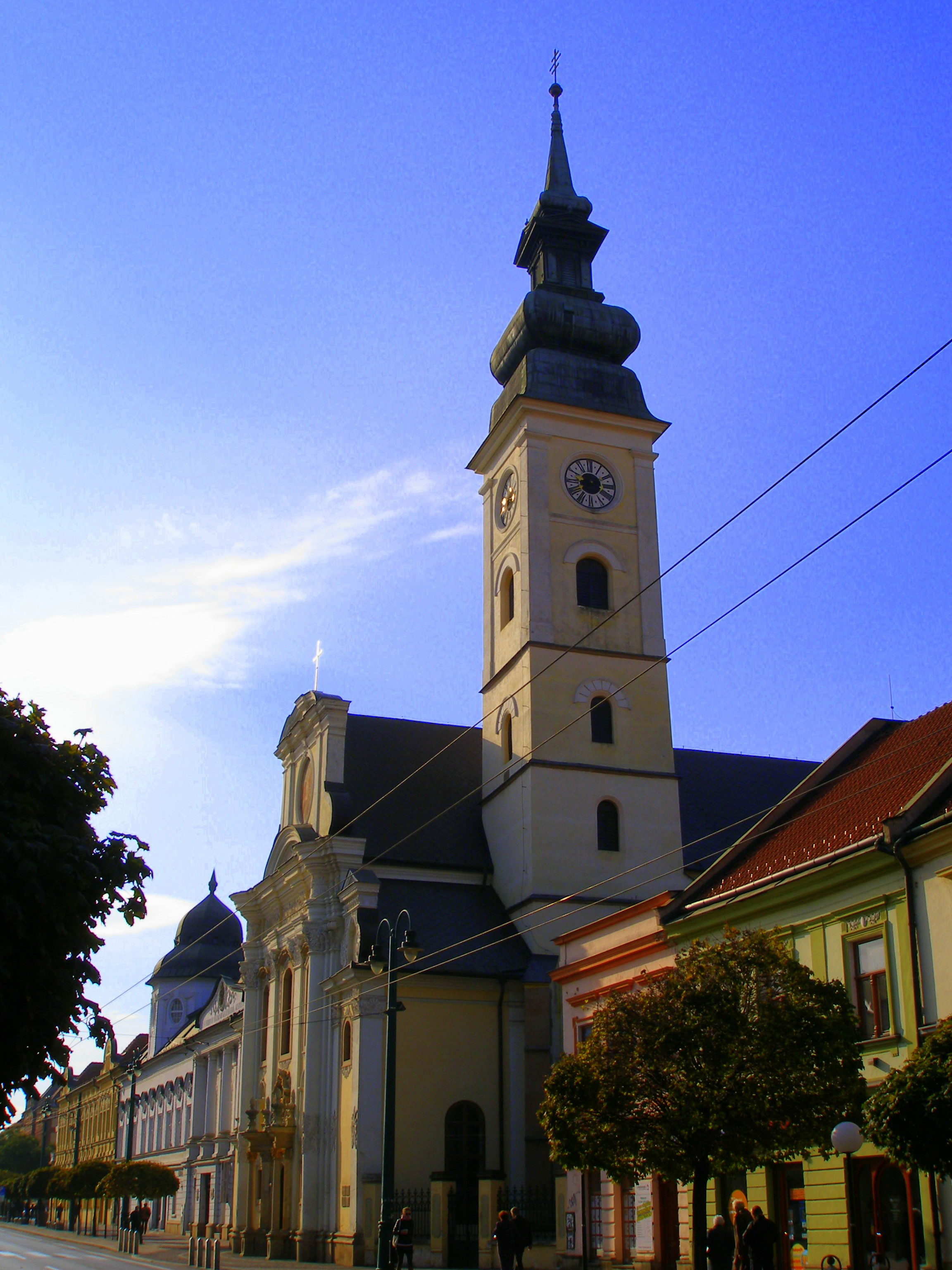
Cathedral of St. John the Baptist

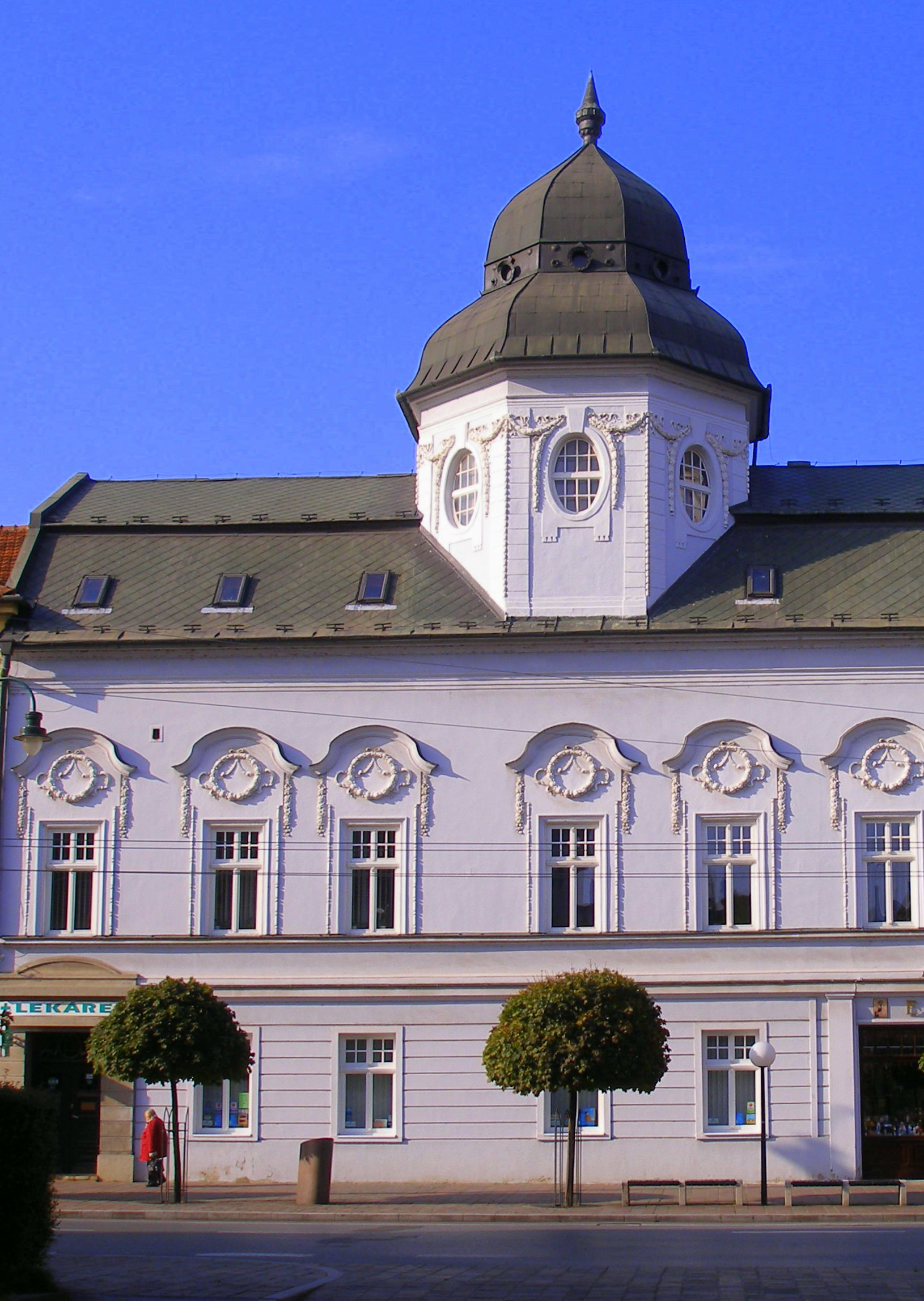
Bishop's Palace Greek Catholic Church

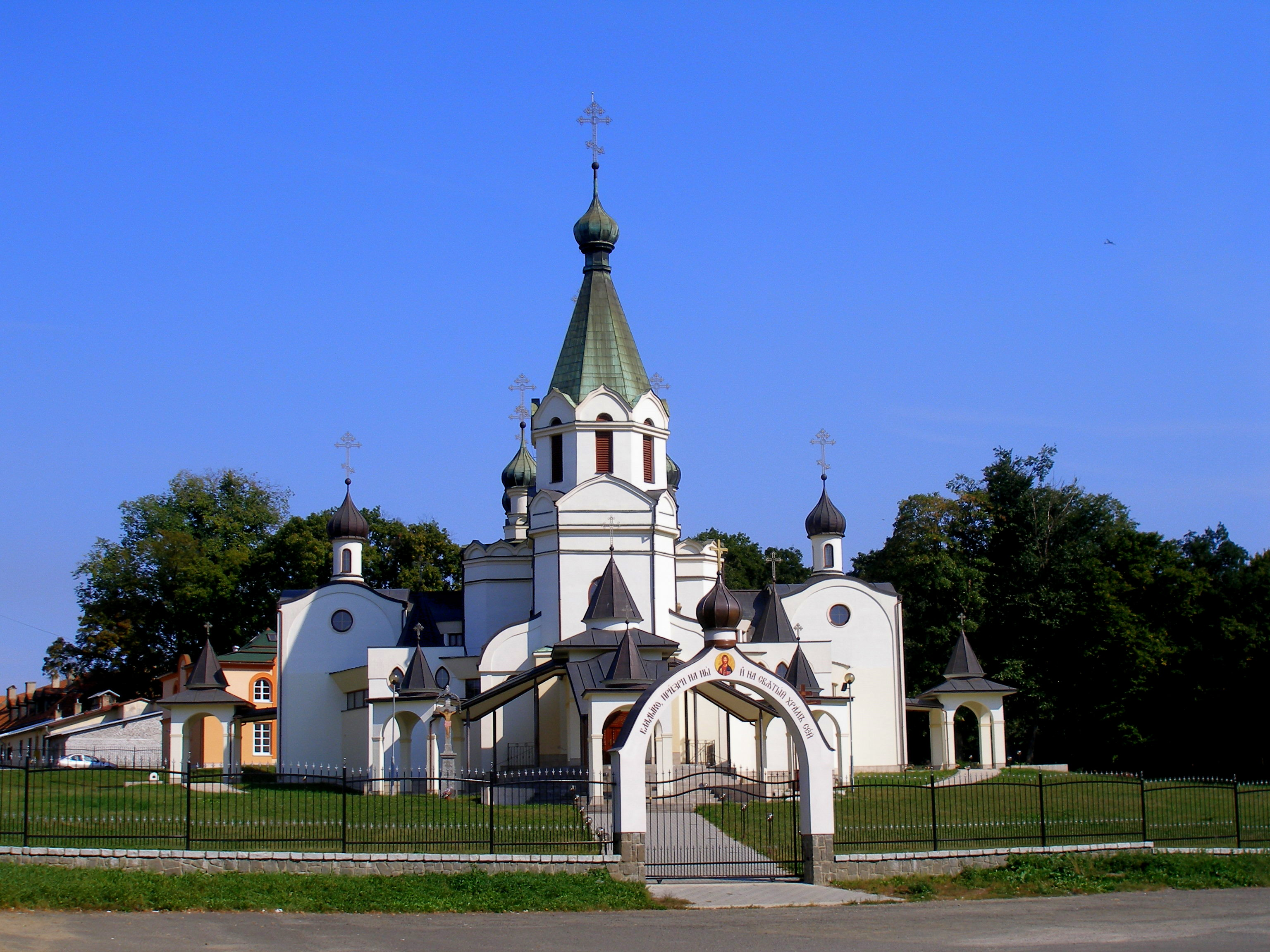
Orthodox Cathedral of St. Prince A. Nevsky

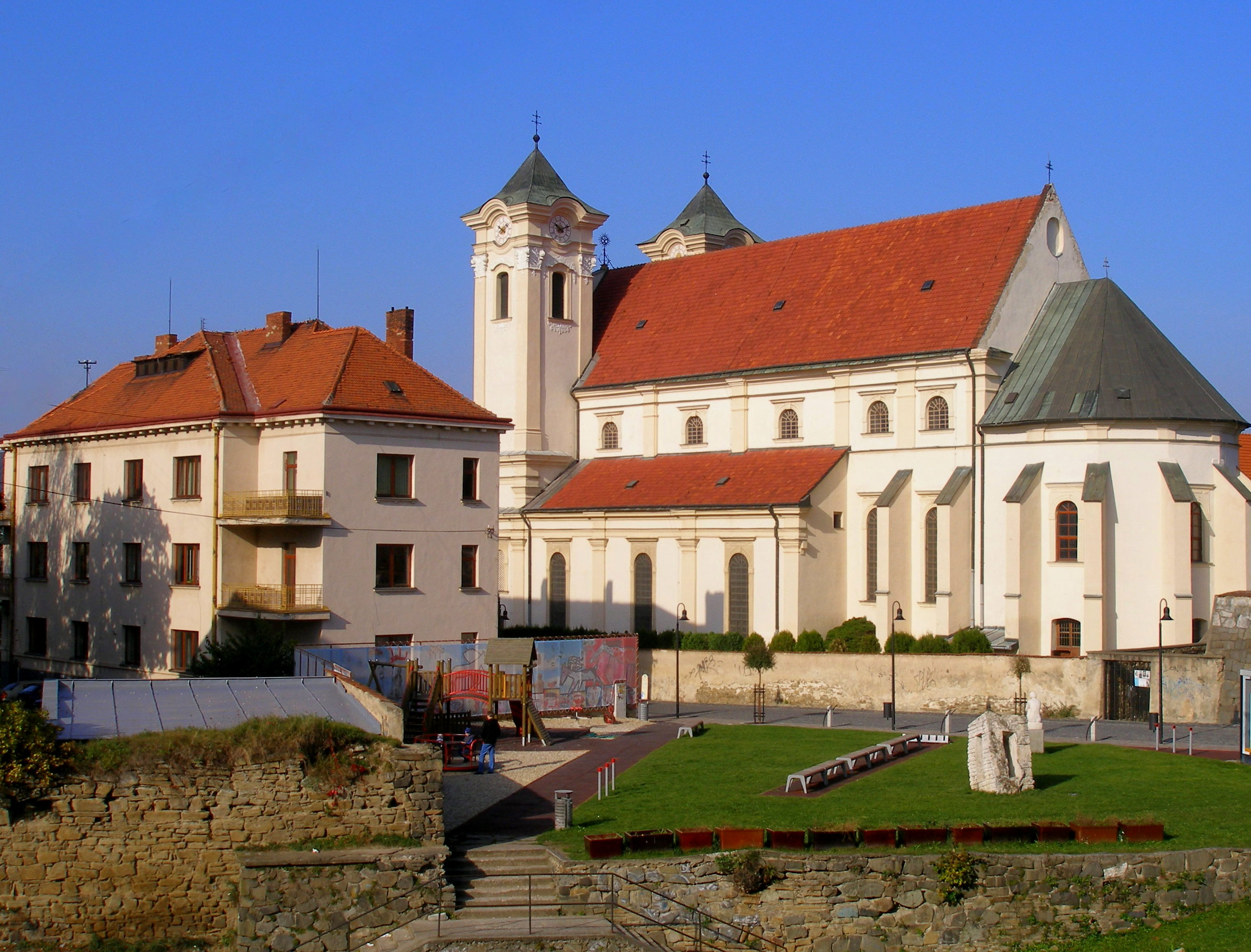
Franciscan Church of St. Joseph

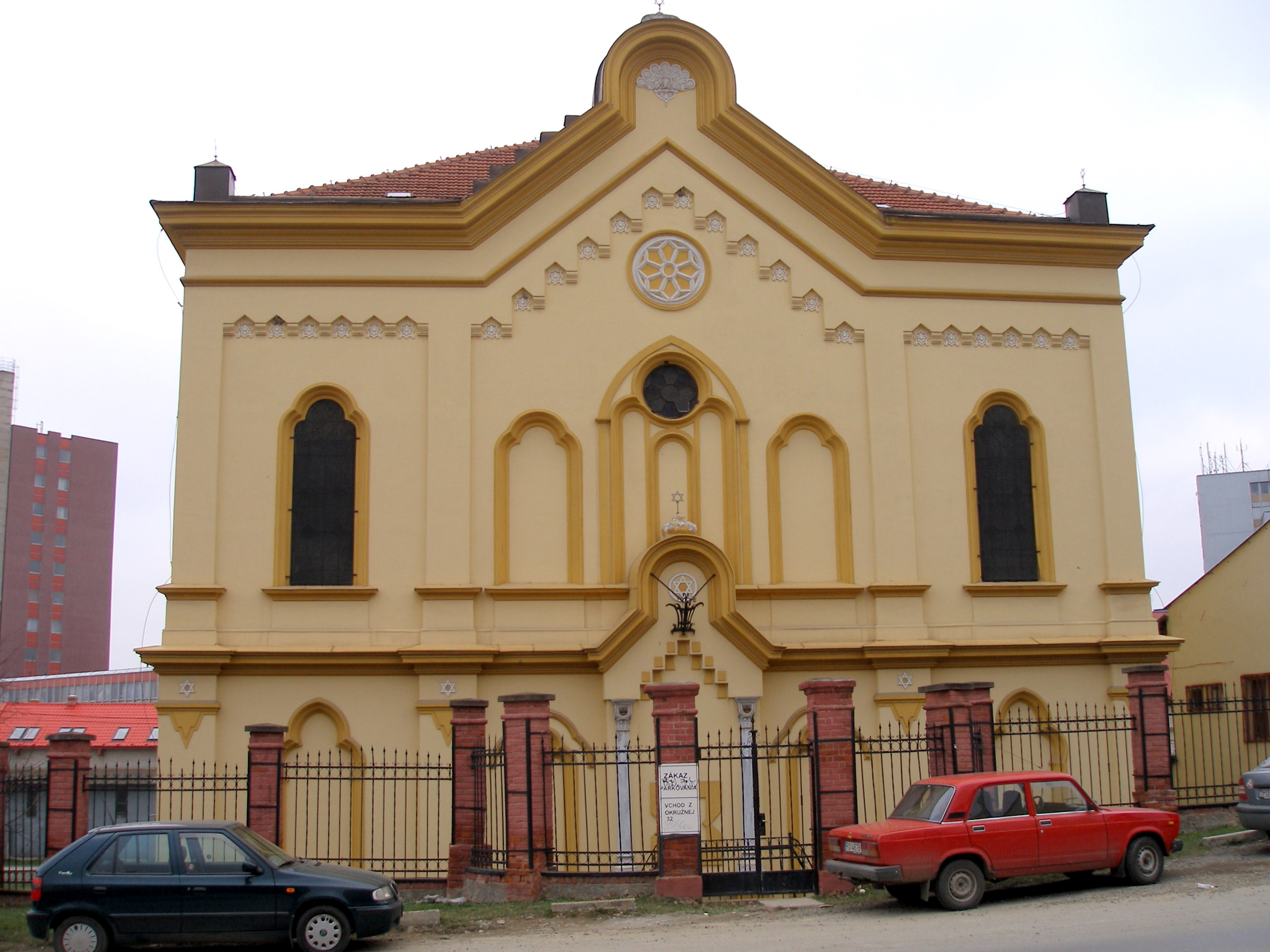
Synagogue

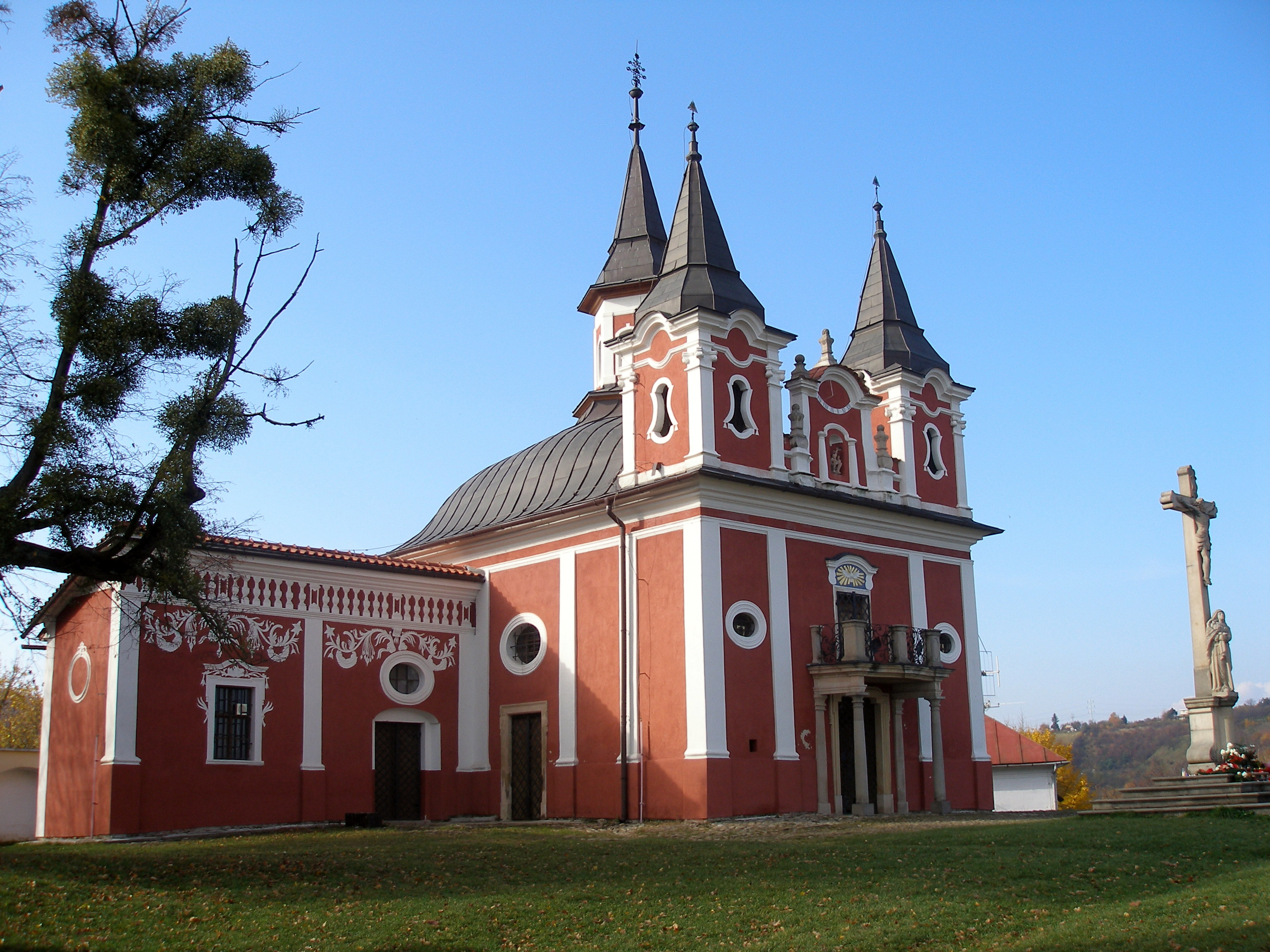
Calvary

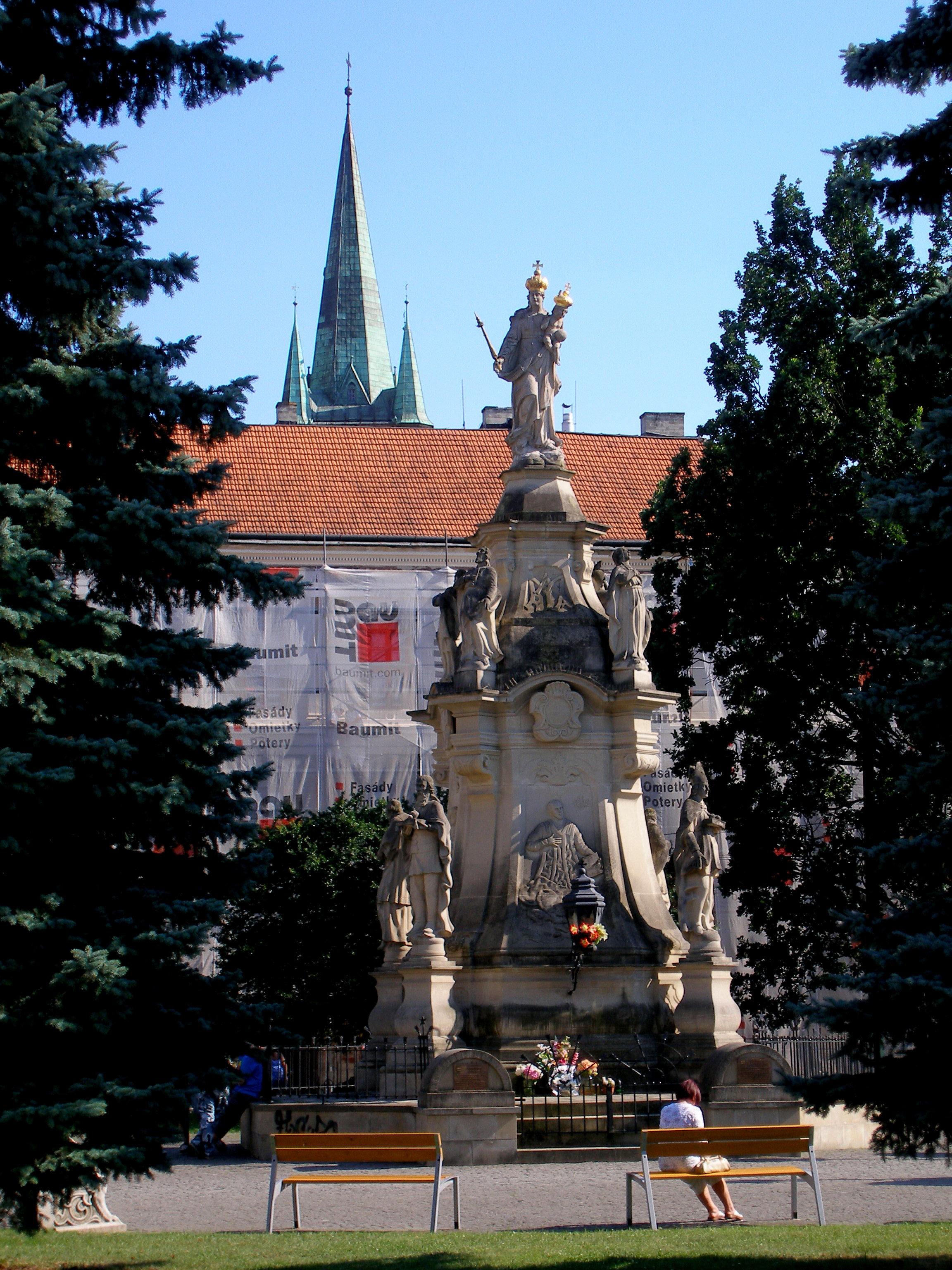
Immaculata

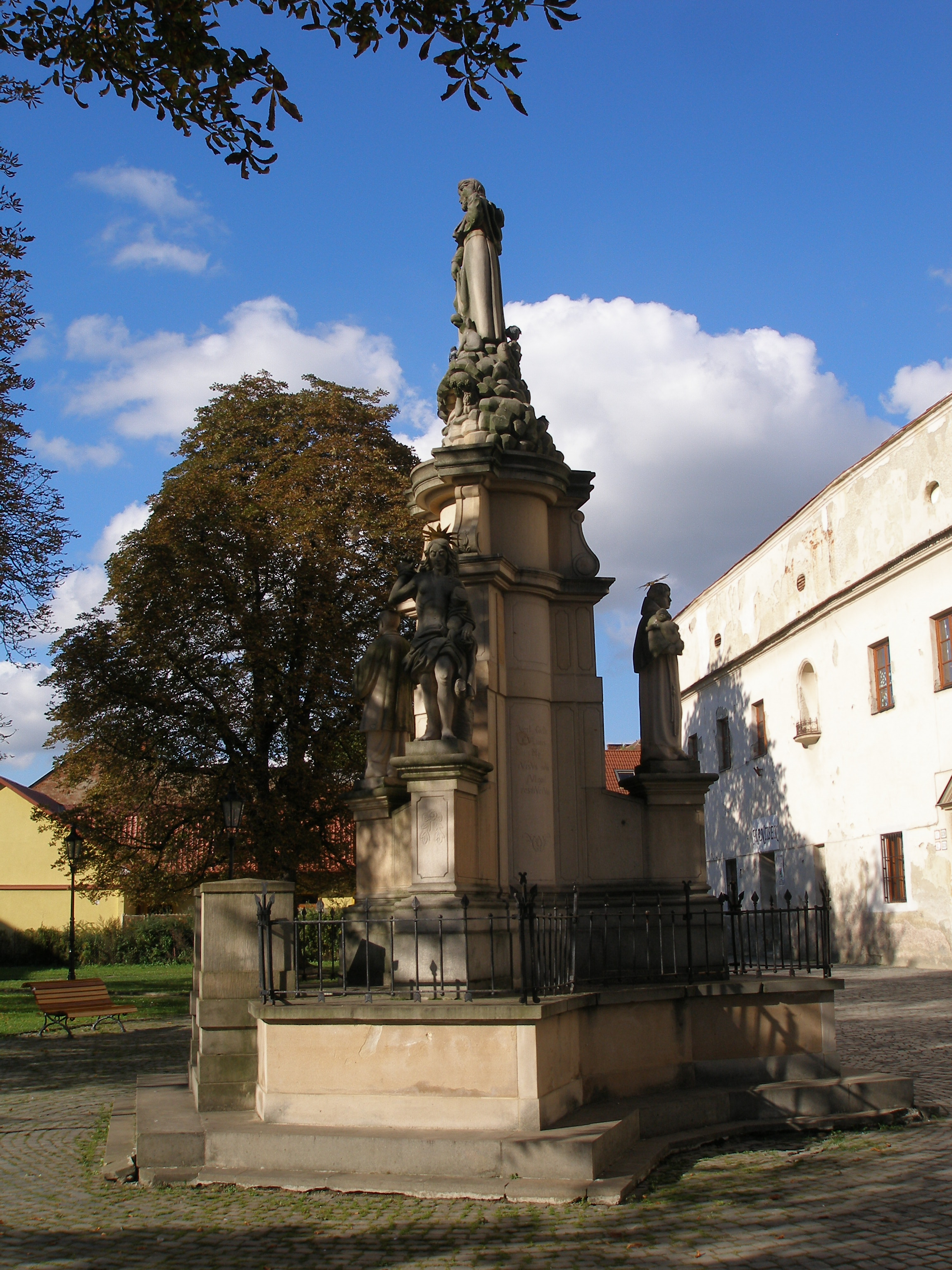
Statue of St. Rochus

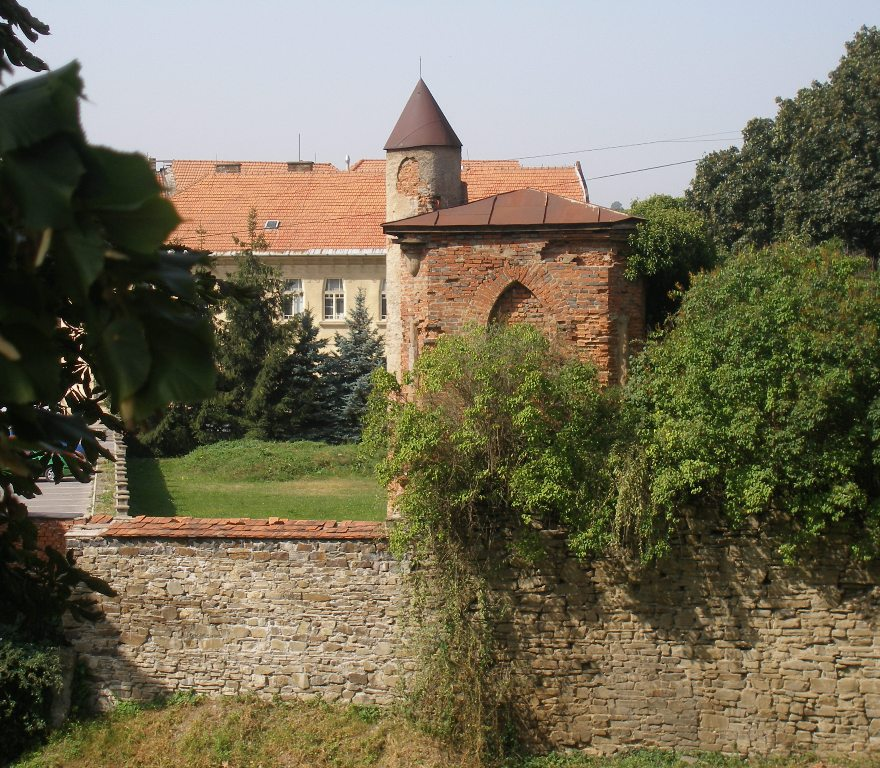
Remnants of city walls

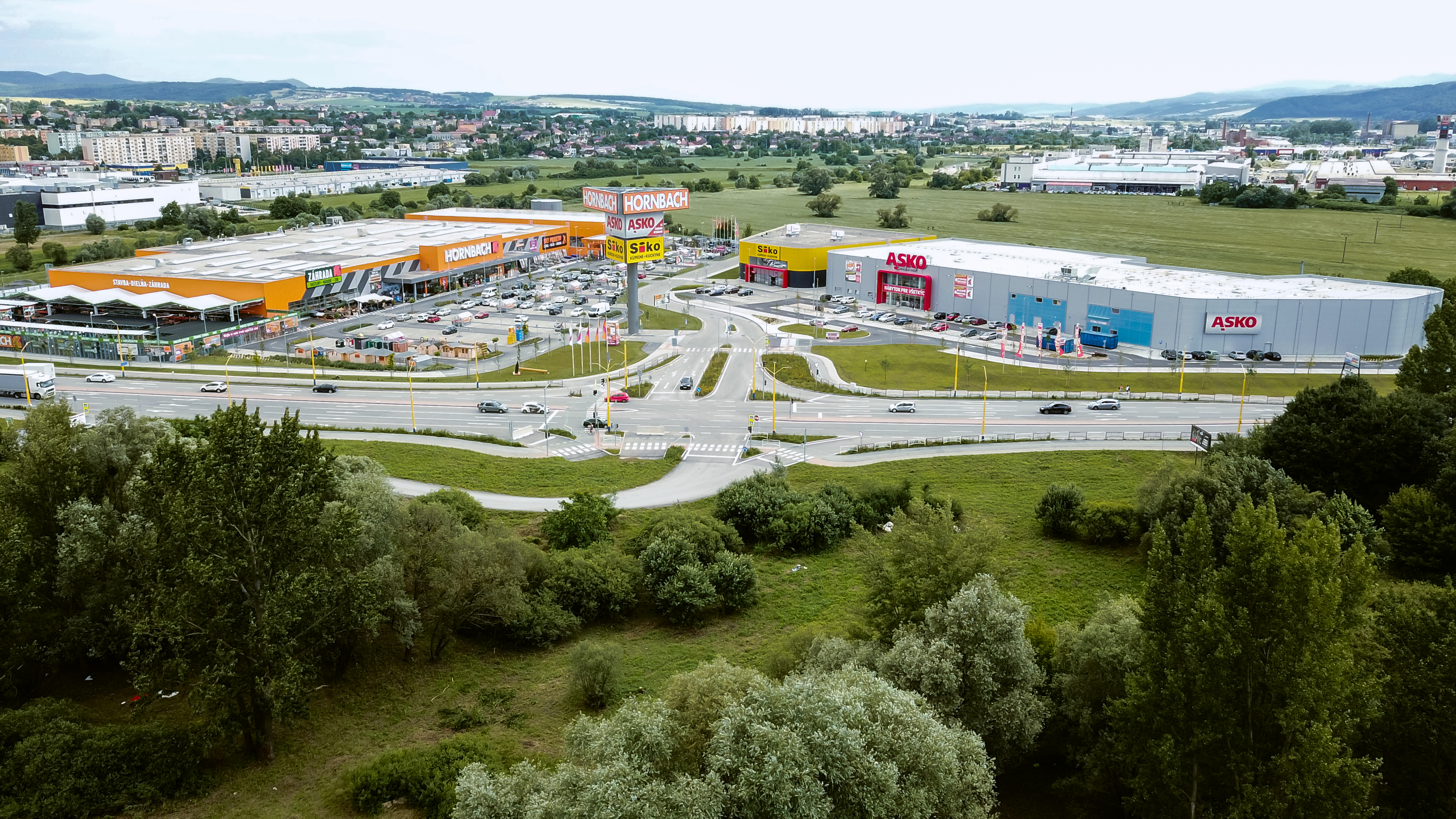
Hobby Park Prešov

== See also ==
- List of cities and towns in Slovakia
- University of Prešov
- Executive Court of Prešov
- Šariš Brewery
