= Kvačany =

Kvačany may refer to several villages in Slovakia:

- Kvačany, Liptovský Mikuláš District
- Kvačany, Prešov District
