= Šarišské Bohdanovce =

- Municipality
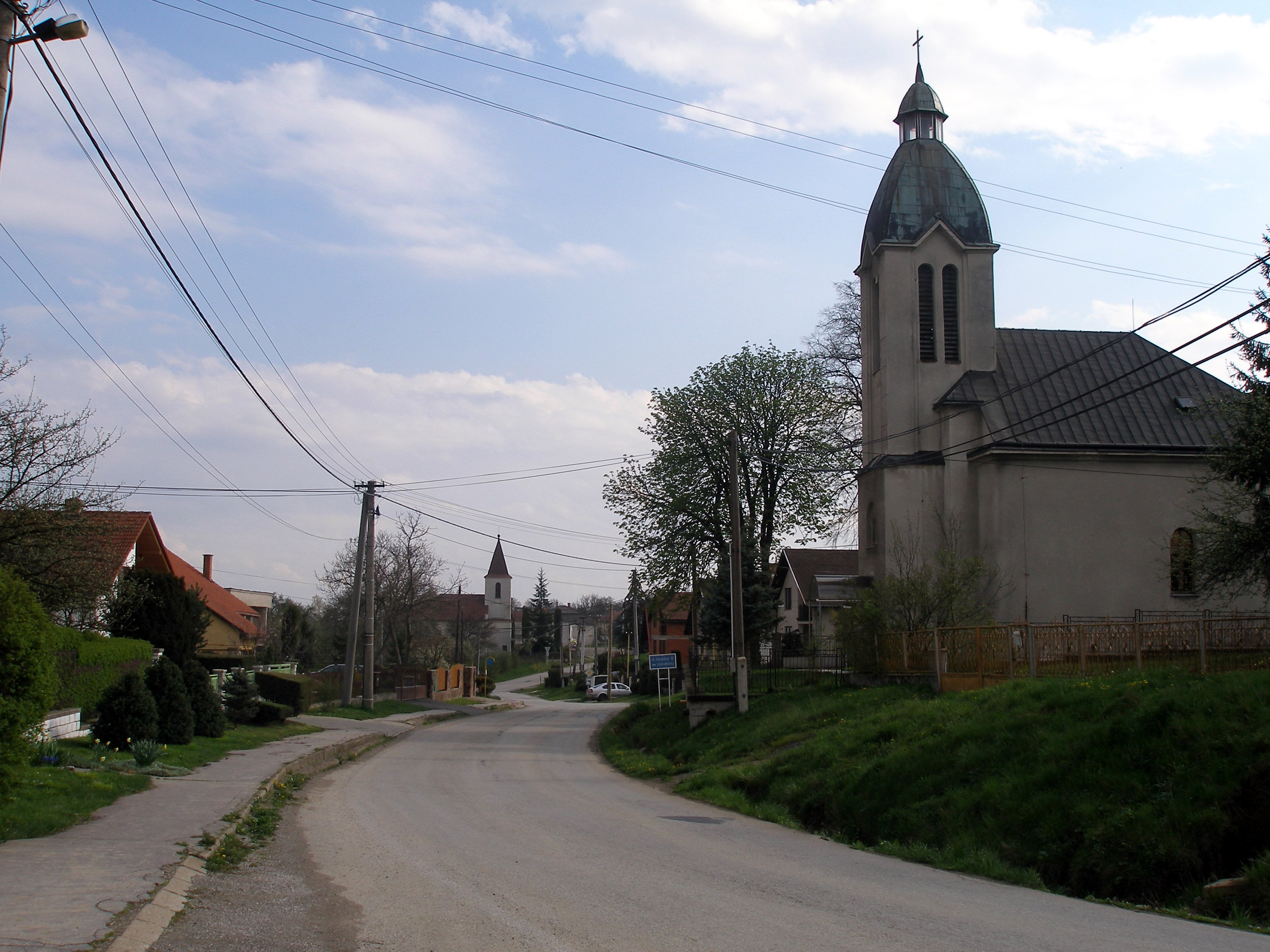

- Flag

- Location of Šarišské Bohdanovce in the Prešov Region Location of Šarišské Bohdanovce in Slovakia
- Coordinates: 48.85°N 21.32°E
- Country: Slovakia
- Region: Prešov Region
- District: Prešov District
- First mentioned: 1351

Government
  - Mayor: Patrik Halčišák (KDH)

Area
  - Total: 9.36 km^{2} (3.61 sq mi)
- Elevation: 217 m (712 ft)

Population (2025)
  - Total: 1,025
- Time zone: UTC+1 (CET)
  - Summer (DST): UTC+2 (CEST)
- Postal code: 820 5
- Area code: +421 51
- Vehicle registration plate (until 2022): PO
- Website: www.sarisskebohdanovce.sk

Šarišské Bohdanovce (Hungarian: Sárosbogdány) is a village and municipality in Prešov District in the Prešov Region of eastern Slovakia.

== History ==
In historical records the village was first mentioned in 1351.

== Geography ==
The municipality lies at an altitude of 217 metres (712 ft) and covers an area of 9.36 km^{2} (3.61 sq mi) (2025).

== Population ==
Population statistic (10 years)
Year	1995	2005	2015	2025
Count	610	634	824	1025
Difference		+3.93%	+29.96%	+24.39%

Population statistic
Year	2024	2025
Count	1024	1025
Difference		+0.09%

It has a population of 1025 people (31 December 2025).

=== Ethnicity ===
Census 2021 (1+ %)
Ethnicity	Number	Fraction
Slovak	939	98.94%
Czech	12	1.26%
Total	949	

In year 2021 was 949 people by ethnicity 939 as Slovak, 12 as Czech, 8 as Not found out, 7 as Rusyn, 4 as Other, 3 as Ukrainian, 3 as Romani, 3 as Hungarian, 1 as Austrian and 1 as English.

Note on population: The difference values of population numbers in the table "Population statistic" and in the sections "Ethnicity" & "Religion" is caused by the use of various statistical methods.

=== Religion ===
Census 2021 (1+ %)
Religion	Number	Fraction
Roman Catholic Church	589	62.07%
None	146	15.38%
Evangelical Church	132	13.91%
Greek Catholic Church	60	6.32%
Total	949	

In year 2021 was 949 people by religion 589 from Roman Catholic Church, 146 from None, 132 from Evangelical Church, 60 from Greek Catholic Church, 4 from Jehovah's Witnesses, 4 from Not found out, 4 from Apostolic Church, 3 from Calvinist Church, 3 from Christian Congregations in Slovakia, 2 from Eastern Orthodox Church, 1 from Jewish community and 1 from Ad hoc movements.
