= Žehňa =

- Municipality
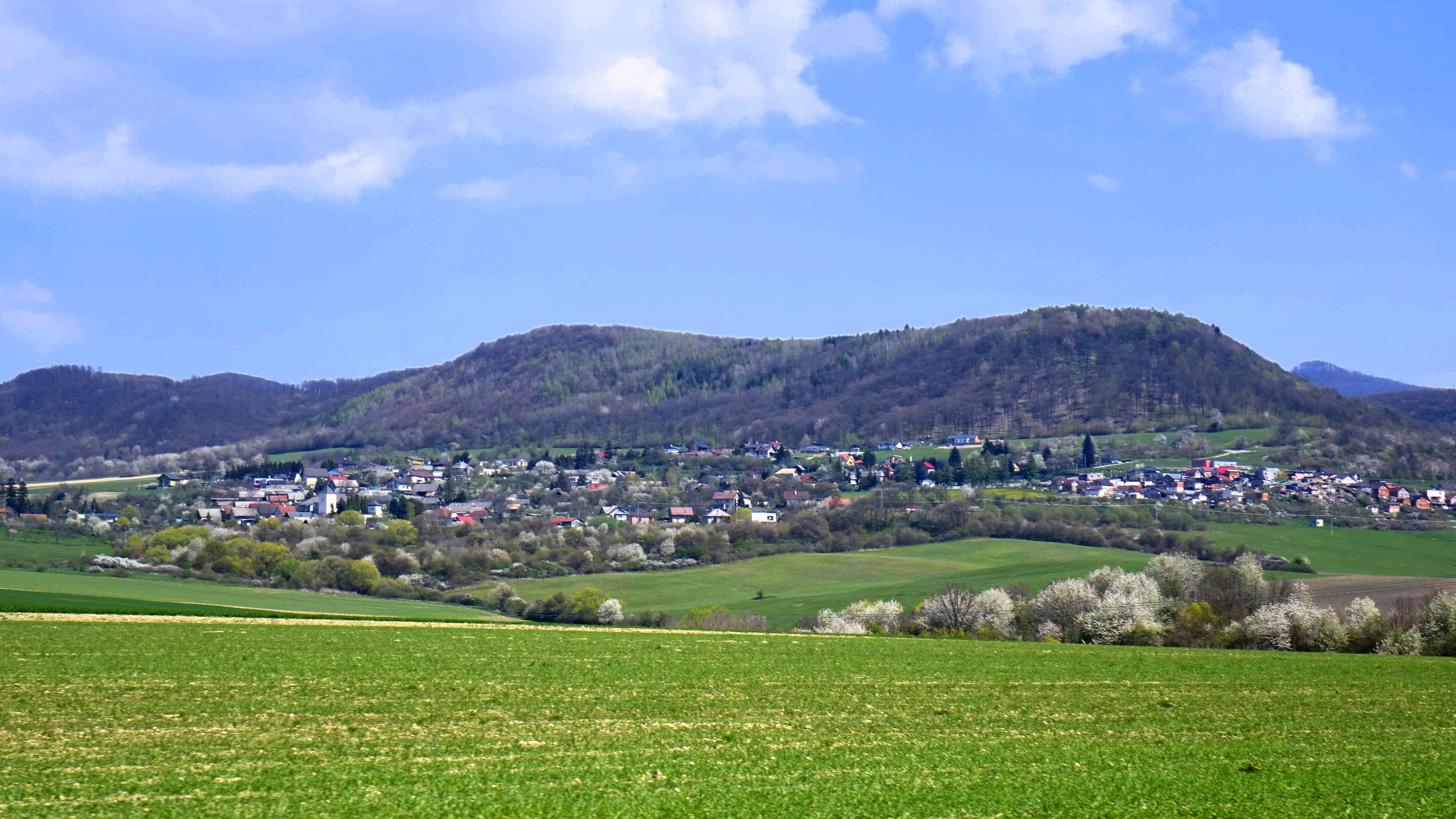

- Location of Žehňa in the Prešov Region Location of Žehňa in Slovakia
- Coordinates: 48.92°N 21.35°E
- Country: Slovakia
- Region: Prešov Region
- District: Prešov District
- First mentioned: 1330

Area
  - Total: 16.75 km^{2} (6.47 sq mi)
- Elevation: 394 m (1,293 ft)

Population (2025)
  - Total: 1,431
- Time zone: UTC+1 (CET)
  - Summer (DST): UTC+2 (CEST)
- Postal code: 820 6
- Area code: +421 51
- Vehicle registration plate (until 2022): PO
- Website: www.obec-zehna.sk

Žehňa (Hungarian: Zsegnye) is a village and municipality in Prešov District in the Prešov Region of eastern Slovakia.

== History ==
In historical records the village was first mentioned in 1330.

== Geography ==
The municipality lies at an altitude of 394 metres (1,293 ft) and covers an area of 16.75 km^{2} (6.47 sq mi) (2025).

== Population ==
Population statistic (10 years)
Year	1995	2005	2015	2025
Count	696	867	1122	1431
Difference		+24.56%	+29.41%	+27.54%

Population statistic
Year	2024	2025
Count	1399	1431
Difference		+2.28%

It has a population of 1431 people (31 December 2025).

=== Ethnicity ===
Census 2021 (1+ %)
Ethnicity	Number	Fraction
Slovak	1133	88.72%
Romani	163	12.76%
Not found out	116	9.08%
Total	1277	

In year 2021 was 1277 people by ethnicity 1133 as Slovak, 163 as Romani, 116 as Not found out, 4 as German, 3 as Rusyn, 3 as Hungarian, 2 as Other, 1 as Irish, 1 as Ukrainian, 1 as Polish and 1 as Canadian.

Note on population: The difference values of population numbers in the table "Population statistic" and in the sections "Ethnicity" & "Religion" is caused by the use of various statistical methods.

=== Religion ===
Census 2021 (1+ %)
Religion	Number	Fraction
Roman Catholic Church	911	71.34%
Evangelical Church	117	9.16%
Not found out	98	7.67%
Greek Catholic Church	74	5.79%
None	53	4.15%
Total	1277	

In year 2021 was 1277 people by religion 911 from Roman Catholic Church, 117 from Evangelical Church, 98 from Not found out, 74 from Greek Catholic Church, 53 from None, 9 from Eastern Orthodox Church, 6 from Christian Congregations in Slovakia, 4 from Islam, 2 from United Methodist Church, 1 from Paganism and natural spirituality, 1 from Buddhism and 1 from Baptists Church.
