= Radatice =

Village and municipality in Slovakia

- Municipality
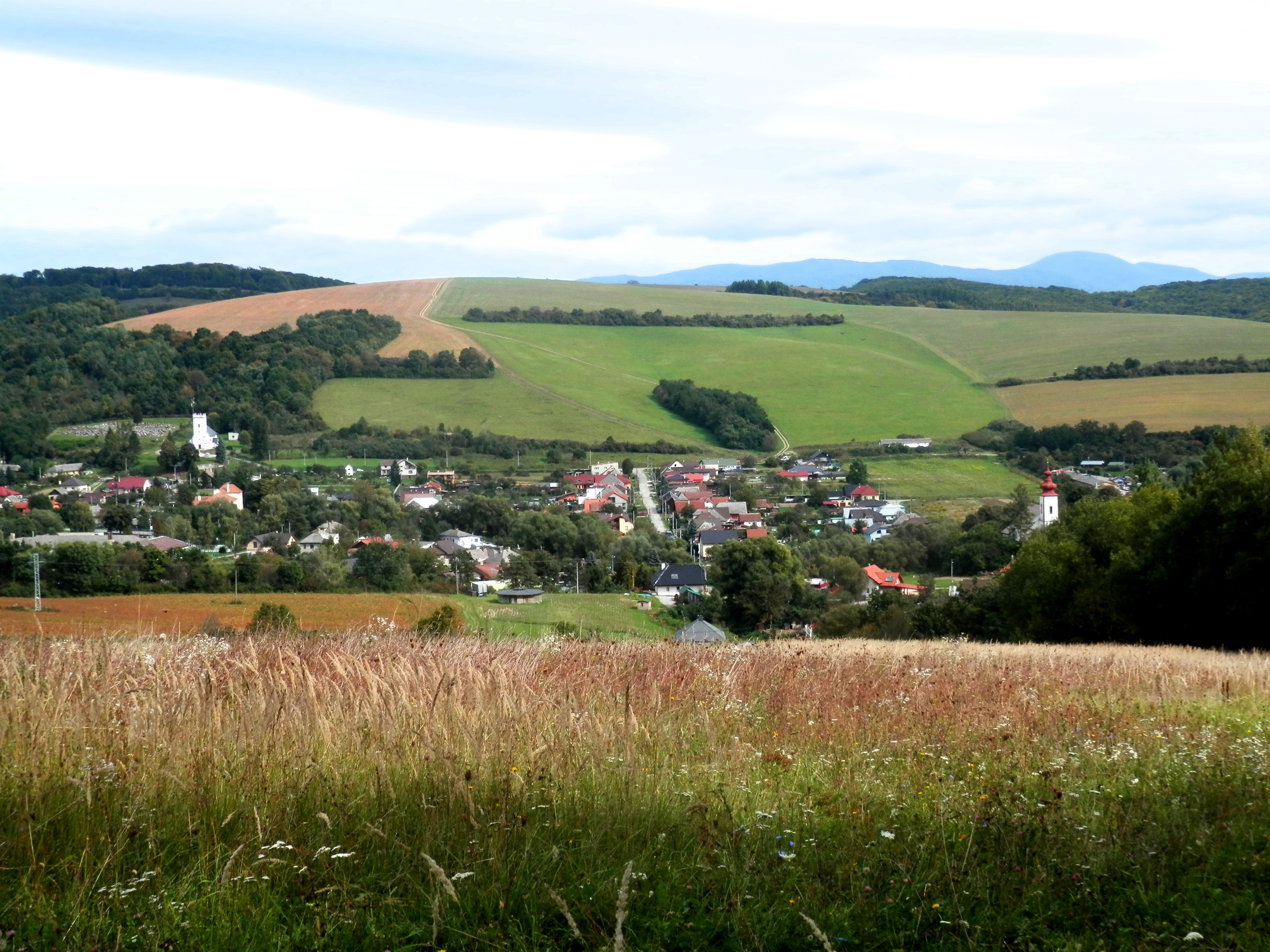

- Flag

- Location of Radatice in the Prešov Region Location of Radatice in Slovakia
- Coordinates: 48.93°N 21.19°E
- Country: Slovakia
- Region: Prešov Region
- District: Prešov District
- First mentioned: 1964

Area
  - Total: 19.27 km^{2} (7.44 sq mi)
- Elevation: 284 m (932 ft)

Population (2025)
  - Total: 788
- Time zone: UTC+1 (CET)
  - Summer (DST): UTC+2 (CEST)
- Postal code: 824 2
- Area code: +421 51
- Vehicle registration plate (until 2022): PO
- Website: www.obecradatice.sk

Radatice (Hungarian: Radácsszentimre) is a village and municipality in Prešov District in the Prešov Region of eastern Slovakia.

== History ==
Radatice village was built in 1964.

== Geography ==
The municipality lies at an altitude of 284 metres (932 ft) and covers an area of 19.27 km^{2} (7.44 sq mi) (2025).

== Population ==
Population statistic (10 years)
Year	1995	2005	2015	2025
Count	779	743	781	788
Difference		−4.62%	+5.11%	+0.89%

Population statistic
Year	2024	2025
Count	784	788
Difference		+0.51%

It has a population of 788 people (31 December 2025).

=== Ethnicity ===
Census 2021 (1+ %)
Ethnicity	Number	Fraction
Slovak	778	99.23%
Czech	8	1.02%
Total	784	

In year 2021 was 784 people by ethnicity 778 as Slovak, 8 as Czech, 7 as Not found out, 2 as Rusyn and 1 as Canadian.

Note on population: The difference values of population numbers in the table "Population statistic" and in the sections "Ethnicity" & "Religion" is caused by the use of various statistical methods.

=== Religion ===
Census 2021 (1+ %)
Religion	Number	Fraction
Roman Catholic Church	682	86.99%
None	40	5.1%
Greek Catholic Church	29	3.7%
Evangelical Church	15	1.91%
Not found out	8	1.02%
Total	784	

In year 2021 was 784 people by religion 682 from Roman Catholic Church, 40 from None, 29 from Greek Catholic Church, 15 from Evangelical Church, 8 from Not found out, 3 from Jehovah's Witnesses, 3 from Other, 2 from Eastern Orthodox Church, 1 from Other and not ascertained christian church and 1 from Christian Congregations in Slovakia.
