= Tuhrina =

Municipality in Slovakia

- Municipality
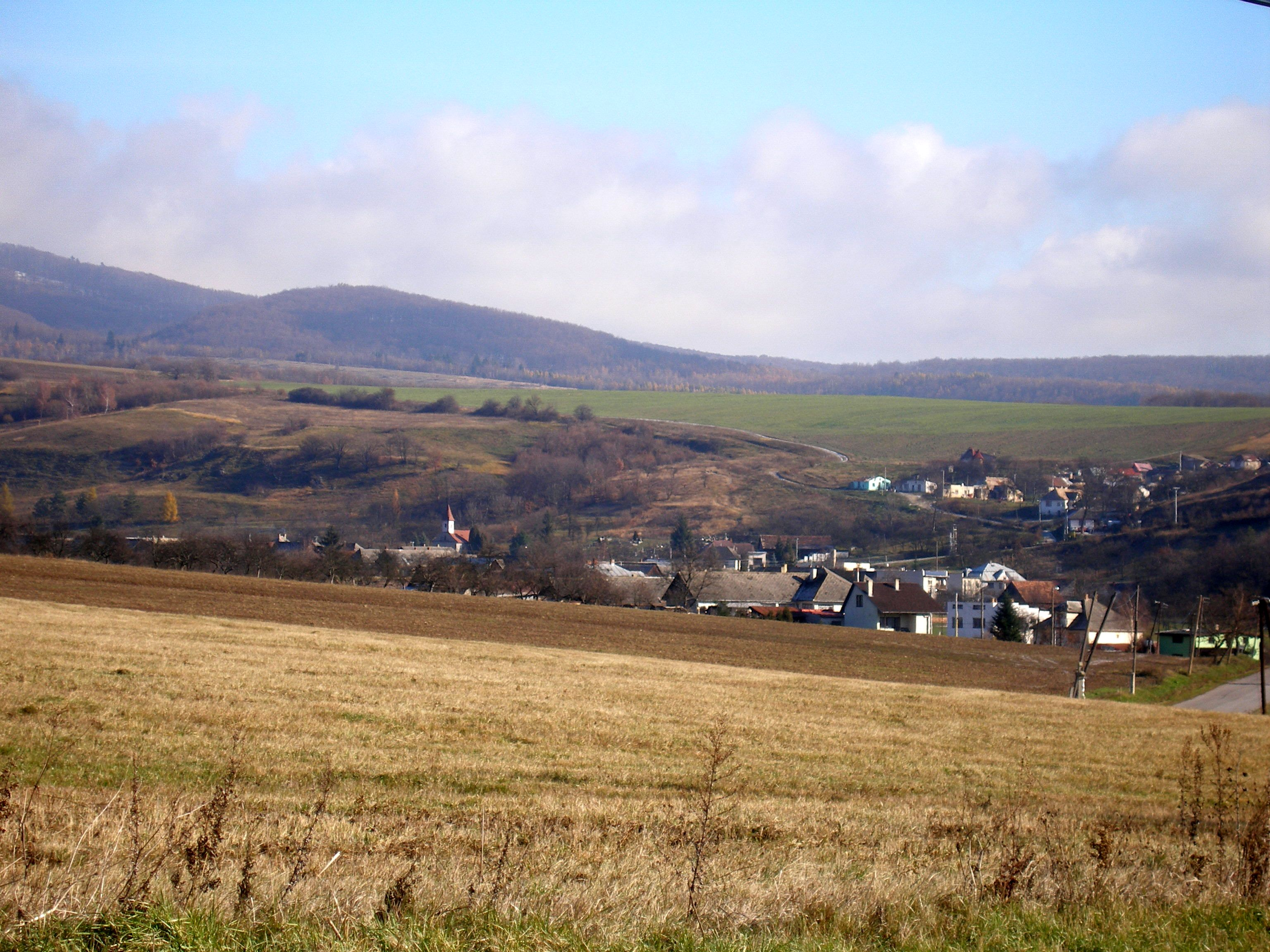

- Flag

- Location of Tuhrina in the Prešov Region Location of Tuhrina in Slovakia
- Coordinates: 48.90°N 21.42°E
- Country: Slovakia
- Region: Prešov Region
- District: Prešov District
- First mentioned: 1427

Area
  - Total: 13.25 km^{2} (5.12 sq mi)
- Elevation: 456 m (1,496 ft)

Population (2025)
  - Total: 563
- Time zone: UTC+1 (CET)
  - Summer (DST): UTC+2 (CEST)
- Postal code: 820 7
- Area code: +421 51
- Vehicle registration plate (until 2022): PO
- Website: www.obectuhrina.sk

Tuhrina (Hungarian: Turina) is a municipality in Prešov District in the Prešov Region of eastern Slovakia.

== History ==
In historical records the village was first mentioned in 1427.

== Geography ==
The municipality lies at an altitude of 456 metres (1,496 ft) and covers an area of 13.25 km^{2} (5.12 sq mi) (2025).

== Population ==
Population statistic (10 years)
Year	1995	2005	2015	2025
Count	390	434	475	563
Difference		+11.28%	+9.44%	+18.52%

Population statistic
Year	2024	2025
Count	554	563
Difference		+1.62%

It has a population of 563 people (31 December 2025).

=== Ethnicity ===
Census 2021 (1+ %)
Ethnicity	Number	Fraction
Slovak	465	91.35%
Romani	240	47.15%
Not found out	45	8.84%
Total	509	

In year 2021 was 509 people by ethnicity 465 as Slovak, 240 as Romani, 45 as Not found out, 3 as Ukrainian, 3 as Rusyn, 2 as Czech and 1 as Other.

Note on population: The difference values of population numbers in the table "Population statistic" and in the sections "Ethnicity" & "Religion" is caused by the use of various statistical methods.

=== Religion ===
Census 2021 (1+ %)
Religion	Number	Fraction
Roman Catholic Church	295	57.96%
None	112	22%
Evangelical Church	57	11.2%
Not found out	24	4.72%
Apostolic Church	8	1.57%
Greek Catholic Church	7	1.38%
Total	509	

In year 2021 was 509 people by religion 295 from Roman Catholic Church, 112 from None, 57 from Evangelical Church, 24 from Not found out, 8 from Apostolic Church, 7 from Greek Catholic Church, 4 from Seventh-day Adventist Church and 2 from Church of the Brethren.

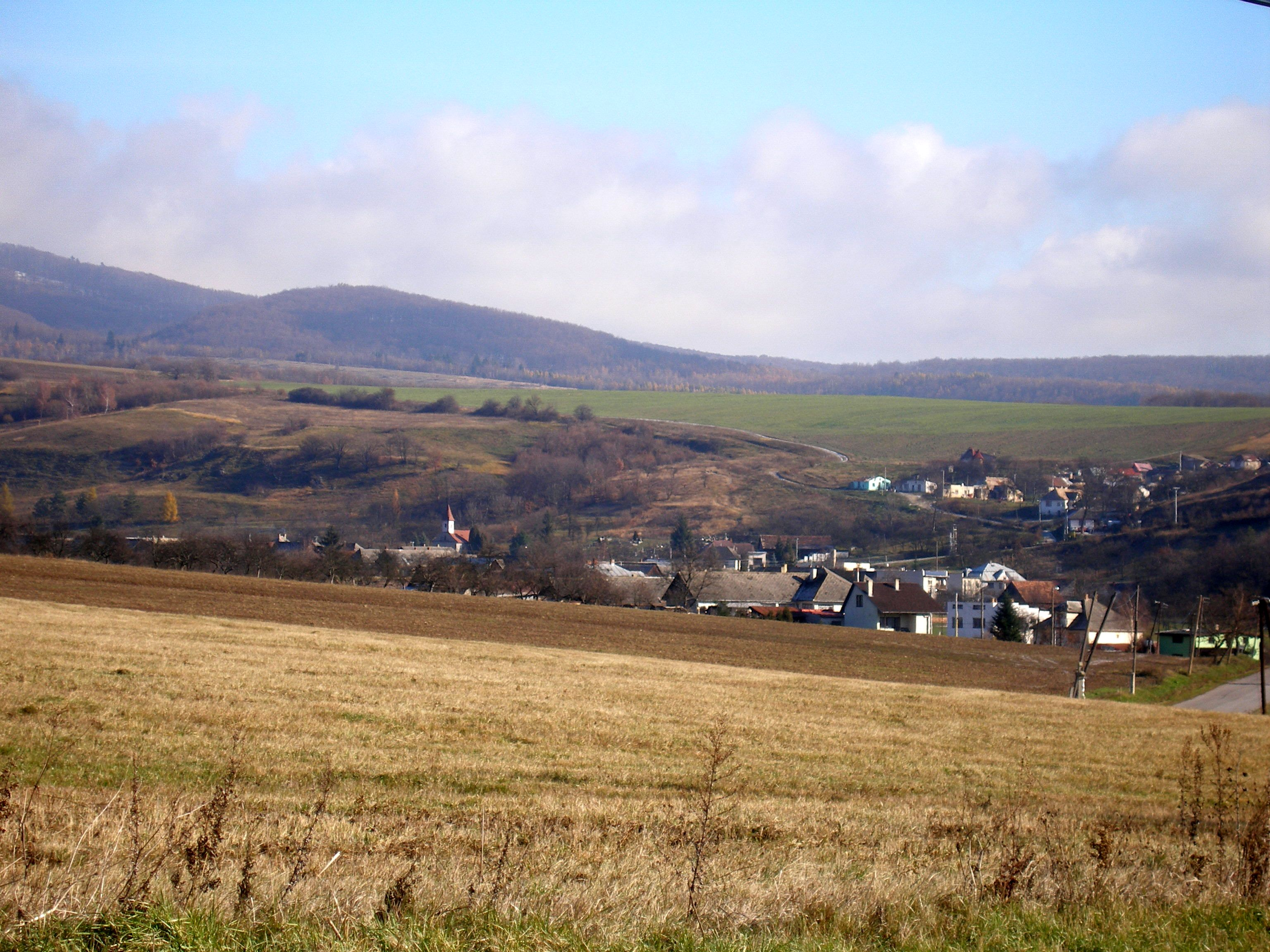
The municipality of Tuhrina
