= Seniakovce =

Village and municipality in Slovakia

- Municipality
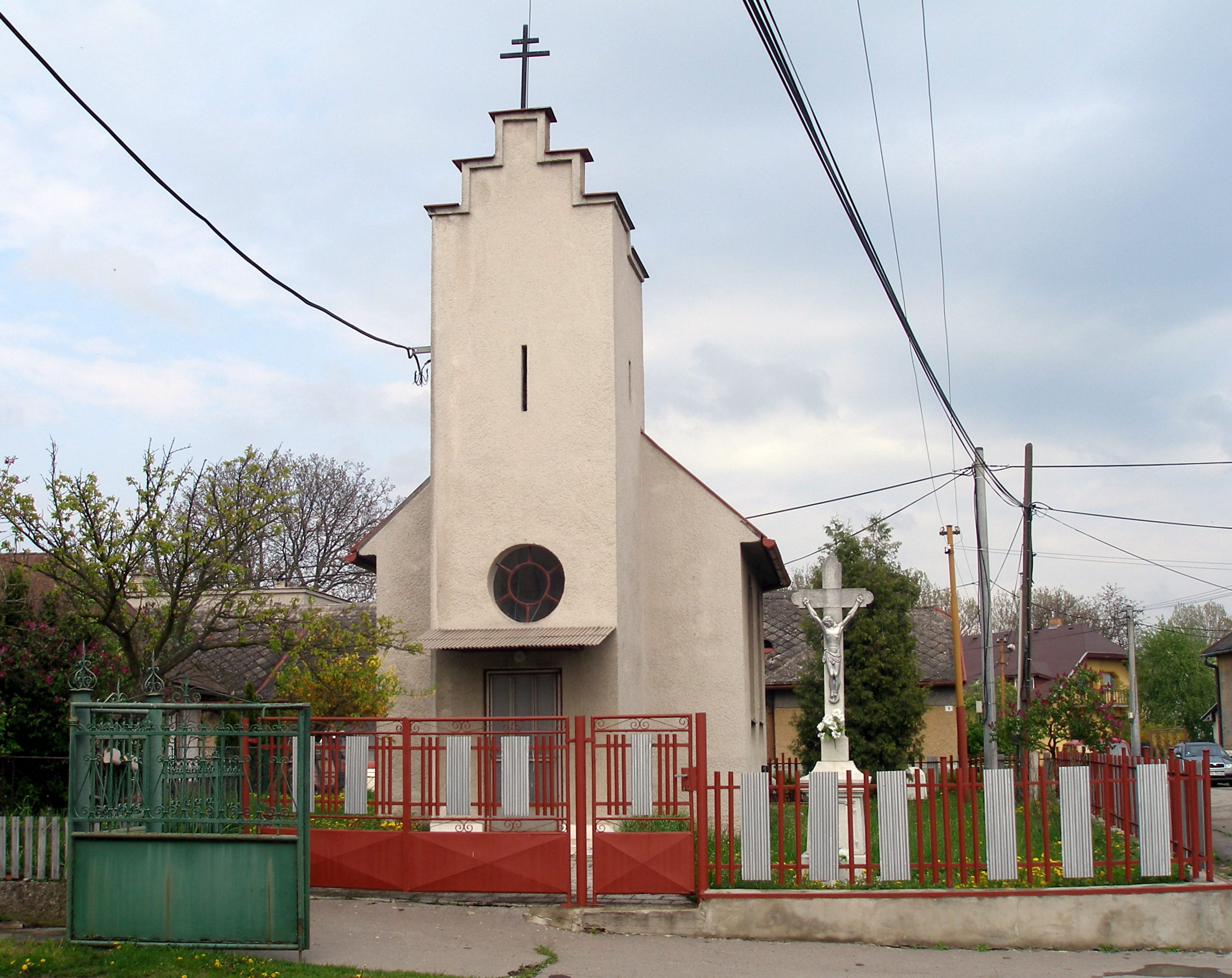

- Flag

- Location of Seniakovce in the Prešov Region Location of Seniakovce in Slovakia
- Coordinates: 48.83°N 21.30°E
- Country: Slovakia
- Region: Prešov Region
- District: Prešov District
- First mentioned: 1289

Area
  - Total: 2.57 km^{2} (0.99 sq mi)
- Elevation: 206 m (676 ft)

Population (2025)
  - Total: 207
- Time zone: UTC+1 (CET)
  - Summer (DST): UTC+2 (CEST)
- Postal code: 820 3
- Area code: +421 51
- Vehicle registration plate (until 2022): PO
- Website: seniakovce.sk

Seniakovce (Hungarian: Senyék) is a village and municipality in Prešov District in the Prešov Region of eastern Slovakia.

== History ==
In historical records the village was first mentioned in 1289.

== Geography ==
The municipality lies at an altitude of 206 metres (676 ft) and covers an area of 2.57 km^{2} (0.99 sq mi) (2025).

== Population ==
Population statistic (10 years)
Year	1995	2005	2015	2025
Count	100	122	136	207
Difference		+22%	+11.47%	+52.20%

Population statistic
Year	2024	2025
Count	187	207
Difference		+10.69%

It has a population of 207 people (31 December 2025).

=== Ethnicity ===
Census 2021 (1+ %)
Ethnicity	Number	Fraction
Slovak	157	96.31%
Not found out	6	3.68%
Rusyn	5	3.06%
Total	163	

In year 2021 was 163 people by ethnicity 157 as Slovak, 6 as Not found out and 5 as Rusyn.

Note on population: The difference values of population numbers in the table "Population statistic" and in the sections "Ethnicity" & "Religion" is caused by the use of various statistical methods.

=== Religion ===
Census 2021 (1+ %)
Religion	Number	Fraction
Roman Catholic Church	80	49.08%
None	27	16.56%
Evangelical Church	26	15.95%
Greek Catholic Church	22	13.5%
Not found out	7	4.29%
Total	163	

In year 2021 was 163 people by religion 80 from Roman Catholic Church, 27 from None, 26 from Evangelical Church, 22 from Greek Catholic Church, 7 from Not found out and 1 from Eastern Orthodox Church.
