= Mošurov =

Village and municipality in Slovakia

- Municipality
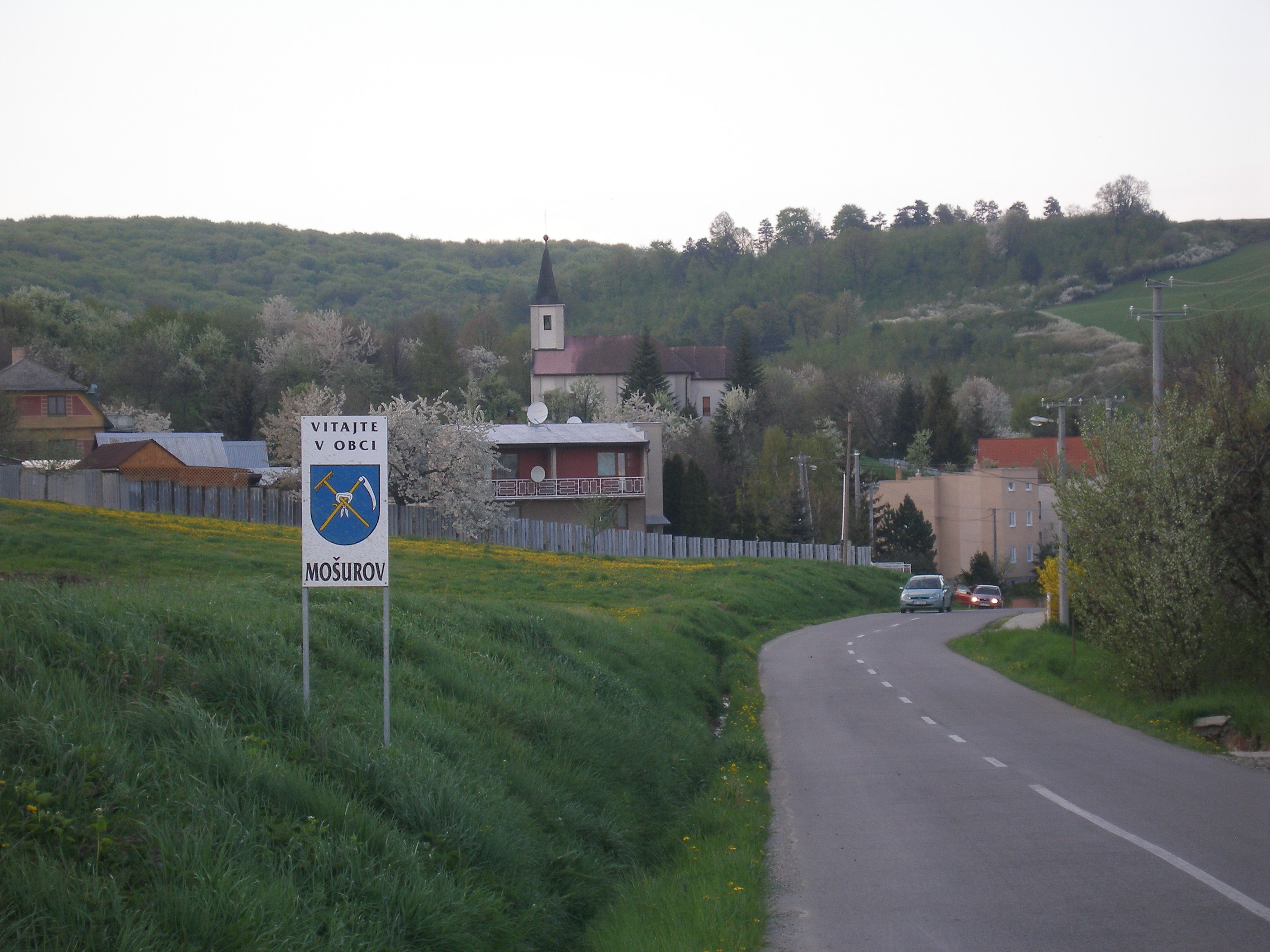

- Flag

- Location of Mošurov in the Prešov Region Location of Mošurov in Slovakia
- Coordinates: 49.12°N 21.25°E
- Country: Slovakia
- Region: Prešov Region
- District: Prešov District
- First mentioned: 1383

Area
  - Total: 5.44 km^{2} (2.10 sq mi)
- Elevation: 367 m (1,204 ft)

Population (2025)
  - Total: 196
- Time zone: UTC+1 (CET)
  - Summer (DST): UTC+2 (CEST)
- Postal code: 826 7
- Area code: +421 51
- Vehicle registration plate (until 2022): PO
- Website: mosurov-obec.sk

Mošurov (Hungarian: Ádámfölde) is a village and municipality in Prešov District in the Prešov Region of eastern Slovakia.

== History ==
In historical records the village was first mentioned in 1383.

== Geography ==
The municipality lies at an altitude of 367 metres (1,204 ft) and covers an area of 5.44 km^{2} (2.10 sq mi) (2025).

== Population ==
Population statistic (10 years)
Year	1995	2005	2015	2025
Count	136	160	185	196
Difference		+17.64%	+15.62%	+5.94%

Population statistic
Year	2024	2025
Count	197	196
Difference		−0.50%

It has a population of 196 people (31 December 2025).

=== Ethnicity ===
Census 2021 (1+ %)
Ethnicity	Number	Fraction
Slovak	177	98.33%
Czech	3	1.66%
Rusyn	3	1.66%
Total	180	

In year 2021 was 180 people by ethnicity 177 as Slovak, 3 as Czech, 3 as Rusyn and 1 as Not found out.

Note on population: The difference values of population numbers in the table "Population statistic" and in the sections "Ethnicity" & "Religion" is caused by the use of various statistical methods.

=== Religion ===
Census 2021 (1+ %)
Religion	Number	Fraction
Roman Catholic Church	158	87.78%
None	12	6.67%
Greek Catholic Church	5	2.78%
Other and not ascertained christian church	3	1.67%
Total	180	

In year 2021 was 180 people by religion 158 from Roman Catholic Church, 12 from None, 5 from Greek Catholic Church, 3 from Other and not ascertained christian church, 1 from Eastern Orthodox Church and 1 from Not found out.
