= Lesíček =

Village and municipality in Slovakia

- Municipality
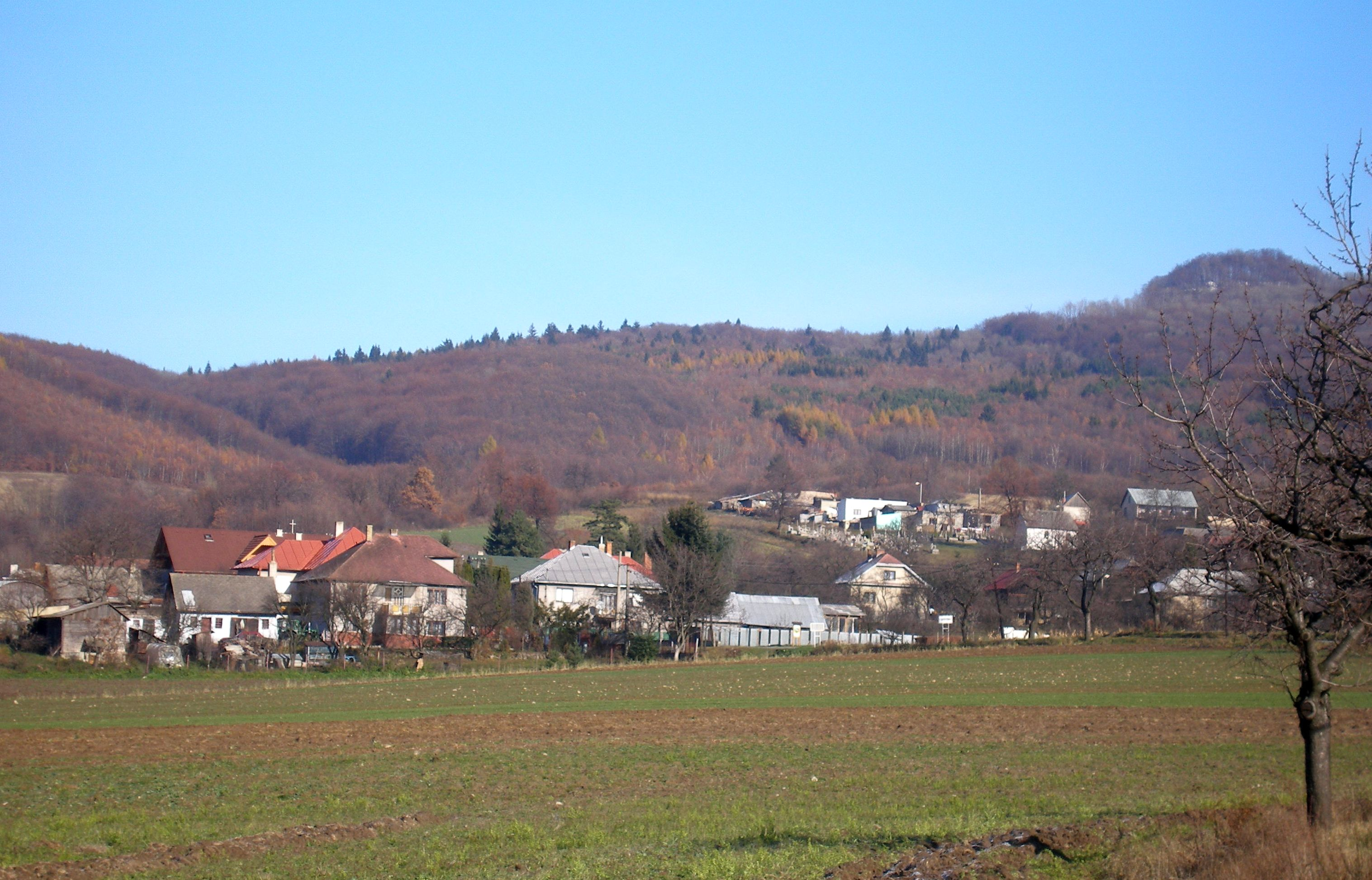

- Flag

- Location of Lesíček in the Prešov Region Location of Lesíček in Slovakia
- Coordinates: 48.92°N 21.38°E
- Country: Slovakia
- Region: Prešov Region
- District: Prešov District
- First mentioned: 1402

Area
  - Total: 6.71 km^{2} (2.59 sq mi)
- Elevation: 523 m (1,716 ft)

Population (2025)
  - Total: 452
- Time zone: UTC+1 (CET)
  - Summer (DST): UTC+2 (CEST)
- Postal code: 820 7
- Area code: +421 51
- Vehicle registration plate (until 2022): PO
- Website: www.lesicek.sk

Lesíček is a village and municipality in Prešov District in the Prešov Region of eastern Slovakia.

== History ==
In historical records the village was first mentioned in 1402.

== Geography ==
The municipality lies at an altitude of 523 metres (1,716 ft) and covers an area of 6.71 km^{2} (2.59 sq mi) (2025).

== Population ==
Population statistic (10 years)
Year	1995	2005	2015	2025
Count	256	301	379	452
Difference		+17.57%	+25.91%	+19.26%

Population statistic
Year	2024	2025
Count	449	452
Difference		+0.66%

It has a population of 452 people (31 December 2025).

=== Ethnicity ===
Census 2021 (1+ %)
Ethnicity	Number	Fraction
Slovak	390	93.3%
Romani	78	18.66%
Not found out	30	7.17%
Total	418	

In year 2021 was 418 people by ethnicity 390 as Slovak, 78 as Romani, 30 as Not found out, 1 as Czech and 1 as Rusyn.

Note on population: The difference values of population numbers in the table "Population statistic" and in the sections "Ethnicity" & "Religion" is caused by the use of various statistical methods.

=== Religion ===
Census 2021 (1+ %)
Religion	Number	Fraction
Roman Catholic Church	205	49.04%
Apostolic Church	102	24.4%
Evangelical Church	43	10.29%
Greek Catholic Church	34	8.13%
Not found out	24	5.74%
None	10	2.39%
Total	418	

In year 2021 was 418 people by religion 205 from Roman Catholic Church, 102 from Apostolic Church, 43 from Evangelical Church, 34 from Greek Catholic Church, 24 from Not found out and 10 from None.
