= Suchá Dolina =

- Municipality
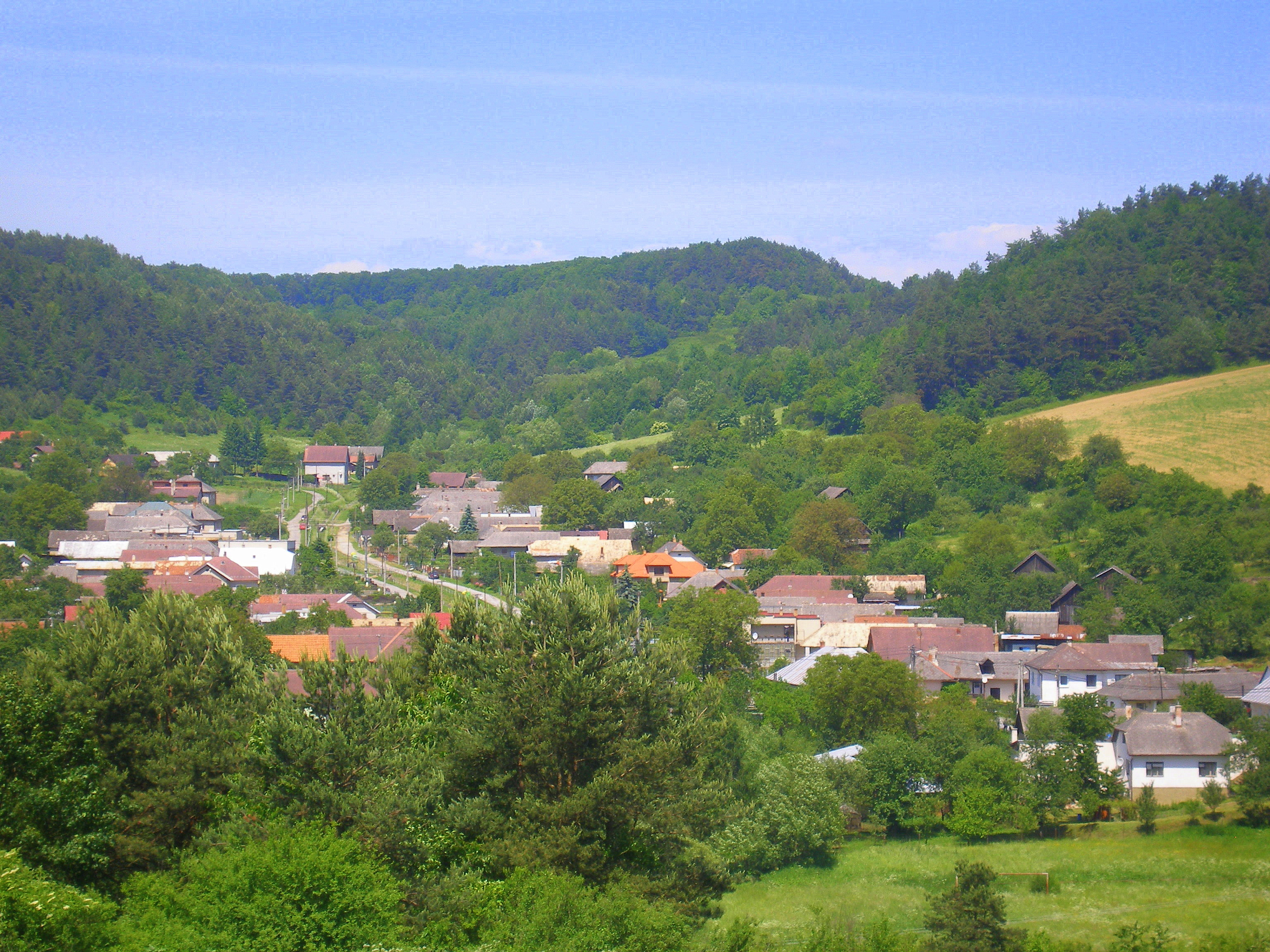

- Flag

- Location of Suchá Dolina in the Prešov Region Location of Suchá Dolina in Slovakia
- Coordinates: 48.92°N 21.15°E
- Country: Slovakia
- Region: Prešov Region
- District: Prešov District
- First mentioned: 1330

Area
  - Total: 6.12 km^{2} (2.36 sq mi)
- Elevation: 442 m (1,450 ft)

Population (2025)
  - Total: 193
- Time zone: UTC+1 (CET)
  - Summer (DST): UTC+2 (CEST)
- Postal code: 824 3
- Area code: +421 51
- Vehicle registration plate (until 2022): PO
- Website: www.suchadolina.sk

Suchá Dolina (Hungarian: Szárazvölgy) is a village and municipality in Prešov District in the Prešov Region of eastern Slovakia.

== History ==
In historical records the village was first mentioned in 1330.

== Geography ==
The municipality lies at an altitude of 442 metres (1,450 ft) and covers an area of 6.12 km^{2} (2.36 sq mi) (2025).

== Population ==
Population statistic (10 years)
Year	1995	2005	2015	2025
Count	226	197	188	193
Difference		−12.83%	−4.56%	+2.65%

Population statistic
Year	2024	2025
Count	196	193
Difference		−1.53%

It has a population of 193 people (31 December 2025).

=== Ethnicity ===
Census 2021 (1+ %)
Ethnicity	Number	Fraction
Slovak	196	96.07%
Not found out	6	2.94%
Total	204	

In year 2021 was 204 people by ethnicity 196 as Slovak, 6 as Not found out, 2 as Czech and 1 as Hungarian.

Note on population: The difference values of population numbers in the table "Population statistic" and in the sections "Ethnicity" & "Religion" is caused by the use of various statistical methods.

=== Religion ===
Census 2021 (1+ %)
Religion	Number	Fraction
Roman Catholic Church	119	58.33%
Greek Catholic Church	55	26.96%
Evangelical Church	12	5.88%
None	12	5.88%
Not found out	6	2.94%
Total	204	

In year 2021 was 204 people by religion 119 from Roman Catholic Church, 55 from Greek Catholic Church, 12 from Evangelical Church, 12 from None and 6 from Not found out.
