= Bzenov =

- Municipality
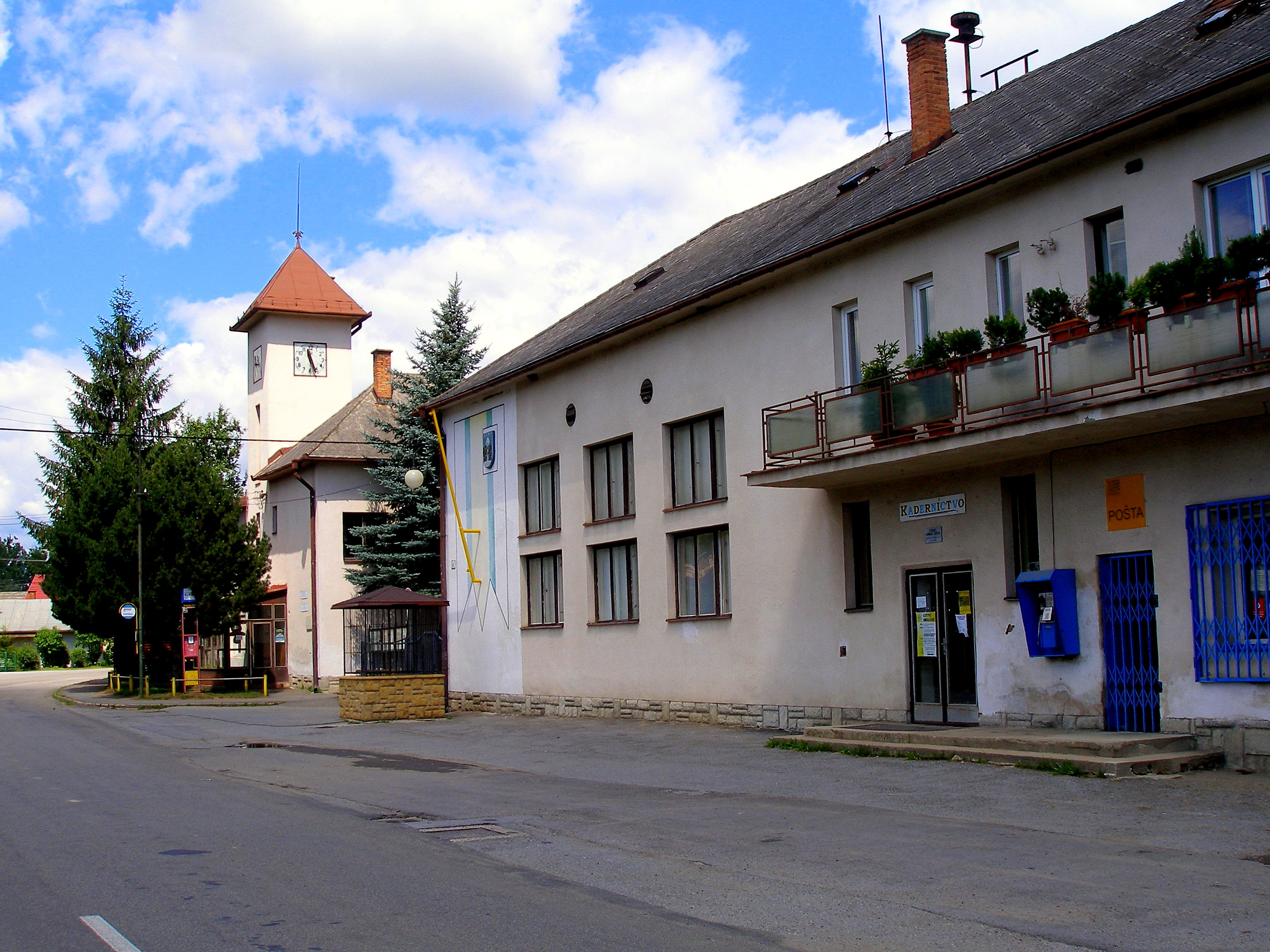

- Flag

- Location of Bzenov in the Prešov Region Location of Bzenov in Slovakia
- Coordinates: 48.95°N 21.17°E
- Country: Slovakia
- Region: Prešov Region
- District: Prešov District
- First mentioned: 1423

Area
  - Total: 3.19 km^{2} (1.23 sq mi)
- Elevation: 304 m (997 ft)

Population (2025)
  - Total: 783
- Time zone: UTC+1 (CET)
  - Summer (DST): UTC+2 (CEST)
- Postal code: 824 2
- Area code: +421 51
- Vehicle registration plate (until 2022): PO
- Website: www.obecbzenov.sk

Bzenov (Hungarian: Berzenke) is a village and municipality in Prešov District in the Prešov Region of eastern Slovakia.

== History ==
In historical records the village was first mentioned in 1423.

== Geography ==
The municipality lies at an altitude of 304 metres (997 ft) and covers an area of 3.19 km^{2} (1.23 sq mi) (2025).

== Population ==
Population statistic (10 years)
Year	1995	2005	2015	2025
Count	693	727	771	783
Difference		+4.90%	+6.05%	+1.55%

Population statistic
Year	2024	2025
Count	778	783
Difference		+0.64%

It has a population of 783 people (31 December 2025).

=== Ethnicity ===
Census 2021 (1+ %)
Ethnicity	Number	Fraction
Slovak	723	96.65%
Romani	40	5.34%
Not found out	20	2.67%
Total	748	

In year 2021 was 748 people by ethnicity 723 as Slovak, 40 as Romani, 20 as Not found out, 6 as Rusyn, 4 as Other, 3 as Chinese, 2 as Czech, 2 as Ukrainian, 1 as Austrian and 1 as Polish.

Note on population: The difference values of population numbers in the table "Population statistic" and in the sections "Ethnicity" & "Religion" is caused by the use of various statistical methods.

=== Religion ===
Census 2021 (1+ %)
Religion	Number	Fraction
Roman Catholic Church	539	72.06%
Evangelical Church	92	12.3%
None	47	6.28%
Greek Catholic Church	27	3.61%
Not found out	21	2.81%
Apostolic Church	10	1.34%
Total	748	

In year 2021 was 748 people by religion 539 from Roman Catholic Church, 92 from Evangelical Church, 47 from None, 27 from Greek Catholic Church, 21 from Not found out, 10 from Apostolic Church, 4 from Calvinist Church, 3 from Jehovah's Witnesses, 2 from Eastern Orthodox Church, 2 from United Methodist Church and 1 from Christian Congregations in Slovakia.

== Genealogical resources ==
The records for genealogical research are available at the state archive "Statny Archiv in Presov, Slovakia"

- Roman Catholic church records (births/marriages/deaths): 1720–1895 (parish B)
- Greek Catholic church records (births/marriages/deaths): 1812–1904 (parish B)
- Lutheran church records (births/marriages/deaths): 1704–1895 (parish B)

== See also ==
- List of municipalities and towns in Slovakia
