= Janovík =

Village and municipality in Slovakia

- Municipality
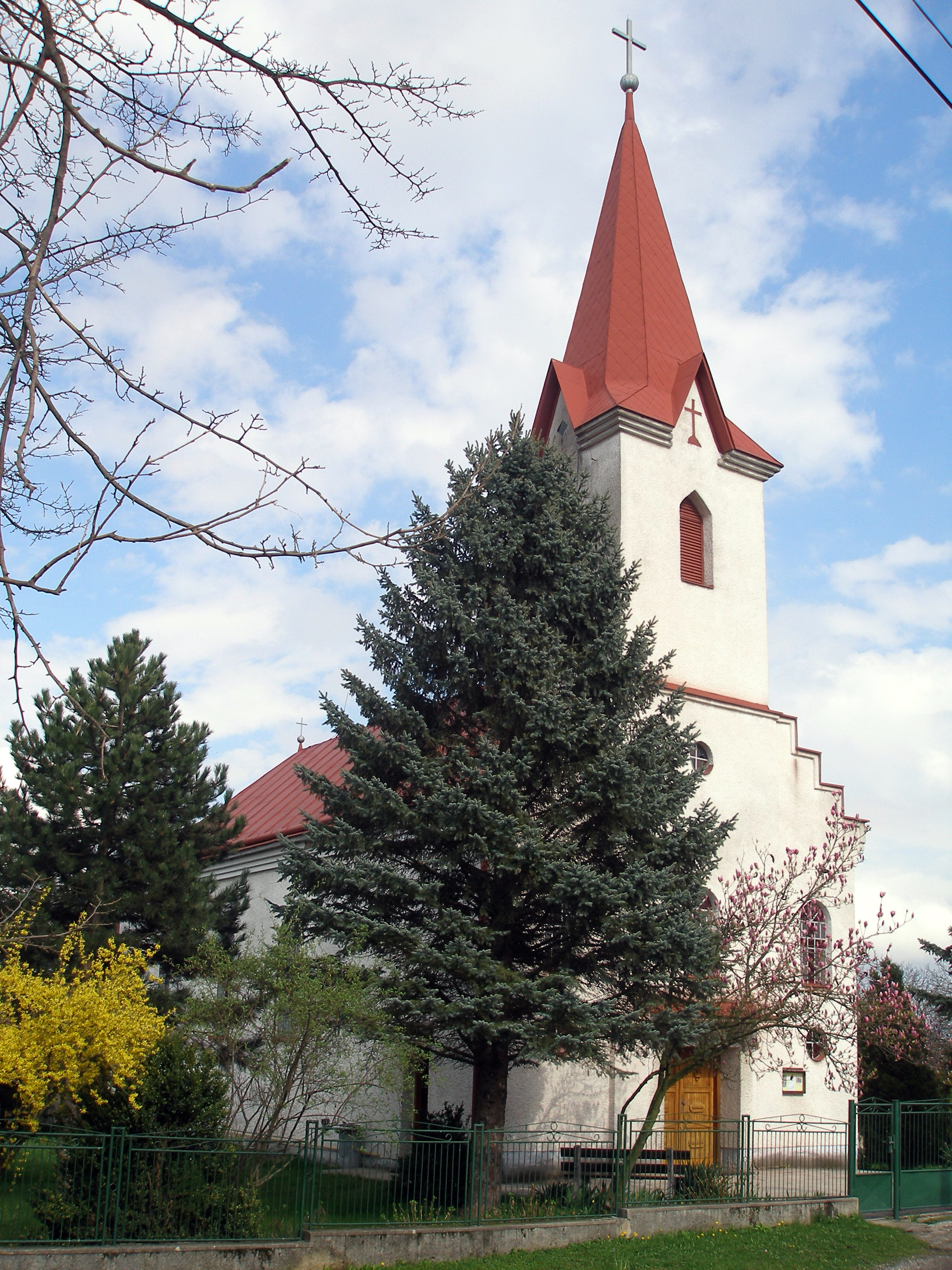

- Flag

- Location of Janovík in the Prešov Region Location of Janovík in Slovakia
- Coordinates: 48.83°N 21.25°E
- Country: Slovakia
- Region: Prešov Region
- District: Prešov District
- First mentioned: 1330

Area
  - Total: 2.38 km^{2} (0.92 sq mi)
- Elevation: 230 m (750 ft)

Population (2025)
  - Total: 467
- Time zone: UTC+1 (CET)
  - Summer (DST): UTC+2 (CEST)
- Postal code: 820 3
- Area code: +421 51
- Vehicle registration plate (until 2022): PO
- Website: www.janovik.sk

Janovík (Hungarian: Janovík) is a village and municipality in Prešov District in the Prešov Region of eastern Slovakia.

== History ==
In historical records the village was first mentioned in 1330.

== Geography ==
The municipality lies at an altitude of 230 metres (750 ft) and covers an area of 2.38 km^{2} (0.92 sq mi) (2025).

== Population ==
Population statistic (10 years)
Year	1995	2005	2015	2025
Count	301	281	286	467
Difference		−6.64%	+1.77%	+63.28%

Population statistic
Year	2024	2025
Count	453	467
Difference		+3.09%

It has a population of 467 people (31 December 2025).

=== Ethnicity ===
Census 2021 (1+ %)
Ethnicity	Number	Fraction
Slovak	372	96.62%
Not found out	12	3.11%
Rusyn	10	2.59%
Total	385	

In year 2021 was 385 people by ethnicity 372 as Slovak, 12 as Not found out, 10 as Rusyn, 1 as Czech, 1 as Romani and 1 as Hungarian.

Note on population: The difference values of population numbers in the table "Population statistic" and in the sections "Ethnicity" & "Religion" is caused by the use of various statistical methods.

=== Religion ===
Census 2021 (1+ %)
Religion	Number	Fraction
Roman Catholic Church	301	78.18%
None	43	11.17%
Greek Catholic Church	17	4.42%
Evangelical Church	10	2.6%
Not found out	9	2.34%
Total	385	

In year 2021 was 385 people by religion 301 from Roman Catholic Church, 43 from None, 17 from Greek Catholic Church, 10 from Evangelical Church, 9 from Not found out, 2 from Other, 1 from Calvinist Church, 1 from Eastern Orthodox Church and 1 from Ad hoc movements.

== Genealogical resources ==
The records for genealogical research are available at the state archive "Statny Archiv in Presov, Slovakia"

== See also ==
- List of municipalities and towns in Slovakia
