= Trnkov =

Village and municipality in Slovakia

- Municipality
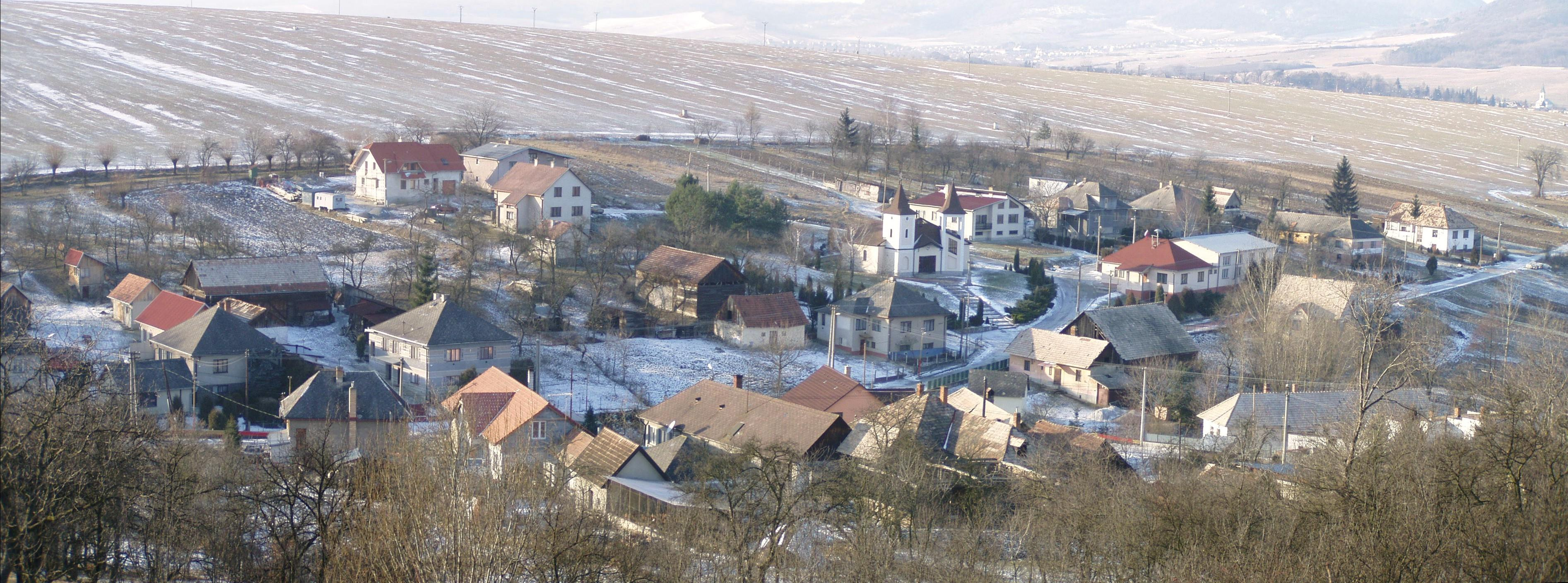

- Flag

- Location of Trnkov in the Prešov Region Location of Trnkov in Slovakia
- Coordinates: 49.03°N 21.37°E
- Country: Slovakia
- Region: Prešov Region
- District: Prešov District
- First mentioned: 1330

Area
  - Total: 1.79 km^{2} (0.69 sq mi)
- Elevation: 305 m (1,001 ft)

Population (2025)
  - Total: 369
- Time zone: UTC+1 (CET)
  - Summer (DST): UTC+2 (CEST)
- Postal code: 821 2
- Area code: +421 51
- Vehicle registration plate (until 2022): PO
- Website: www.trnkov.sk

Trnkov (Hungarian: Kiskökény) is a village and municipality in Prešov District in the Prešov Region of eastern Slovakia.

== History ==
In historical records the village was first mentioned in 1330.

== Geography ==
The municipality lies at an altitude of 305 metres (1,001 ft) and covers an area of 1.79 km^{2} (0.69 sq mi) (2025).

== Population ==
Population statistic (10 years)
Year	1995	2005	2015	2025
Count	189	214	223	369
Difference		+13.22%	+4.20%	+65.47%

Population statistic
Year	2024	2025
Count	333	369
Difference		+10.81%

It has a population of 369 people (31 December 2025).

=== Ethnicity ===
Census 2021 (1+ %)
Ethnicity	Number	Fraction
Slovak	236	94.02%
Not found out	8	3.18%
Rusyn	5	1.99%
Total	251	

In year 2021 was 251 people by ethnicity 236 as Slovak, 8 as Not found out, 5 as Rusyn, 2 as Czech, 1 as Silesian, 1 as Russian and 1 as Other.

Note on population: The difference values of population numbers in the table "Population statistic" and in the sections "Ethnicity" & "Religion" is caused by the use of various statistical methods.

=== Religion ===
Census 2021 (1+ %)
Religion	Number	Fraction
Greek Catholic Church	126	50.2%
Roman Catholic Church	88	35.06%
None	17	6.77%
Not found out	9	3.59%
Evangelical Church	7	2.79%
Eastern Orthodox Church	3	1.2%
Total	251	

In year 2021 was 251 people by religion 126 from Greek Catholic Church, 88 from Roman Catholic Church, 17 from None, 9 from Not found out, 7 from Evangelical Church, 3 from Eastern Orthodox Church and 1 from Other.
