= Ovčie =

- Municipality
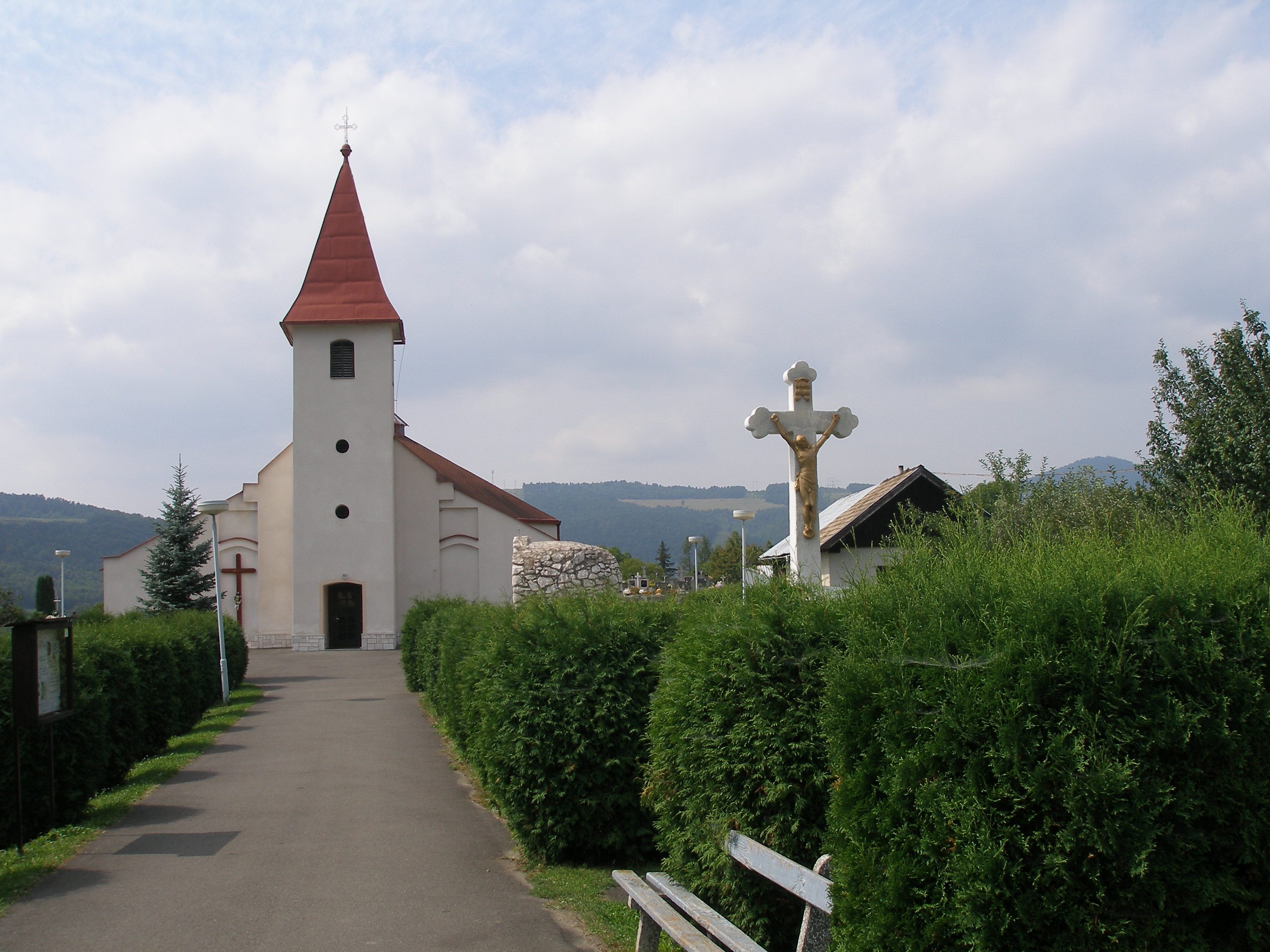

- Flag

- Location of Ovčie in the Prešov Region Location of Ovčie in Slovakia
- Coordinates: 48.97°N 20.98°E
- Country: Slovakia
- Region: Prešov Region
- District: Prešov District
- First mentioned: 1320

Area
  - Total: 3.15 km^{2} (1.22 sq mi)
- Elevation: 479 m (1,572 ft)

Population (2025)
  - Total: 678
- Time zone: UTC+1 (CET)
  - Summer (DST): UTC+2 (CEST)
- Postal code: 823 8
- Area code: +421 51
- Vehicle registration plate (until 2022): PO
- Website: www.ovcie.sk

Ovčie (Hungarian: Kisvitéz) is a village and municipality in Prešov District in the Prešov Region of eastern Slovakia.

== History ==
In historical records the village was first mentioned in 1320.

== Geography ==
The municipality lies at an altitude of 479 metres (1,572 ft) and covers an area of 3.15 km^{2} (1.22 sq mi) (2025).

== Population ==
Population statistic (10 years)
Year	1995	2005	2015	2025
Count	635	670	670	678
Difference		+5.51%	+0%	+1.19%

Population statistic
Year	2024	2025
Count	679	678
Difference		−0.14%

It has a population of 678 people (31 December 2025).

=== Ethnicity ===
Census 2021 (1+ %)
Ethnicity	Number	Fraction
Slovak	631	95.46%
Not found out	28	4.23%
Total	661	

In year 2021 was 661 people by ethnicity 631 as Slovak, 28 as Not found out, 2 as Czech, 2 as Romani and 1 as Ukrainian.

Note on population: The difference values of population numbers in the table "Population statistic" and in the sections "Ethnicity" & "Religion" is caused by the use of various statistical methods.

=== Religion ===
Census 2021 (1+ %)
Religion	Number	Fraction
Roman Catholic Church	616	93.19%
Not found out	26	3.93%
None	16	2.42%
Total	661	

In year 2021 was 661 people by religion 616 from Roman Catholic Church, 26 from Not found out, 16 from None and 3 from Greek Catholic Church.
