= Malý Slivník =

Village and municipality in Slovakia

- Municipality
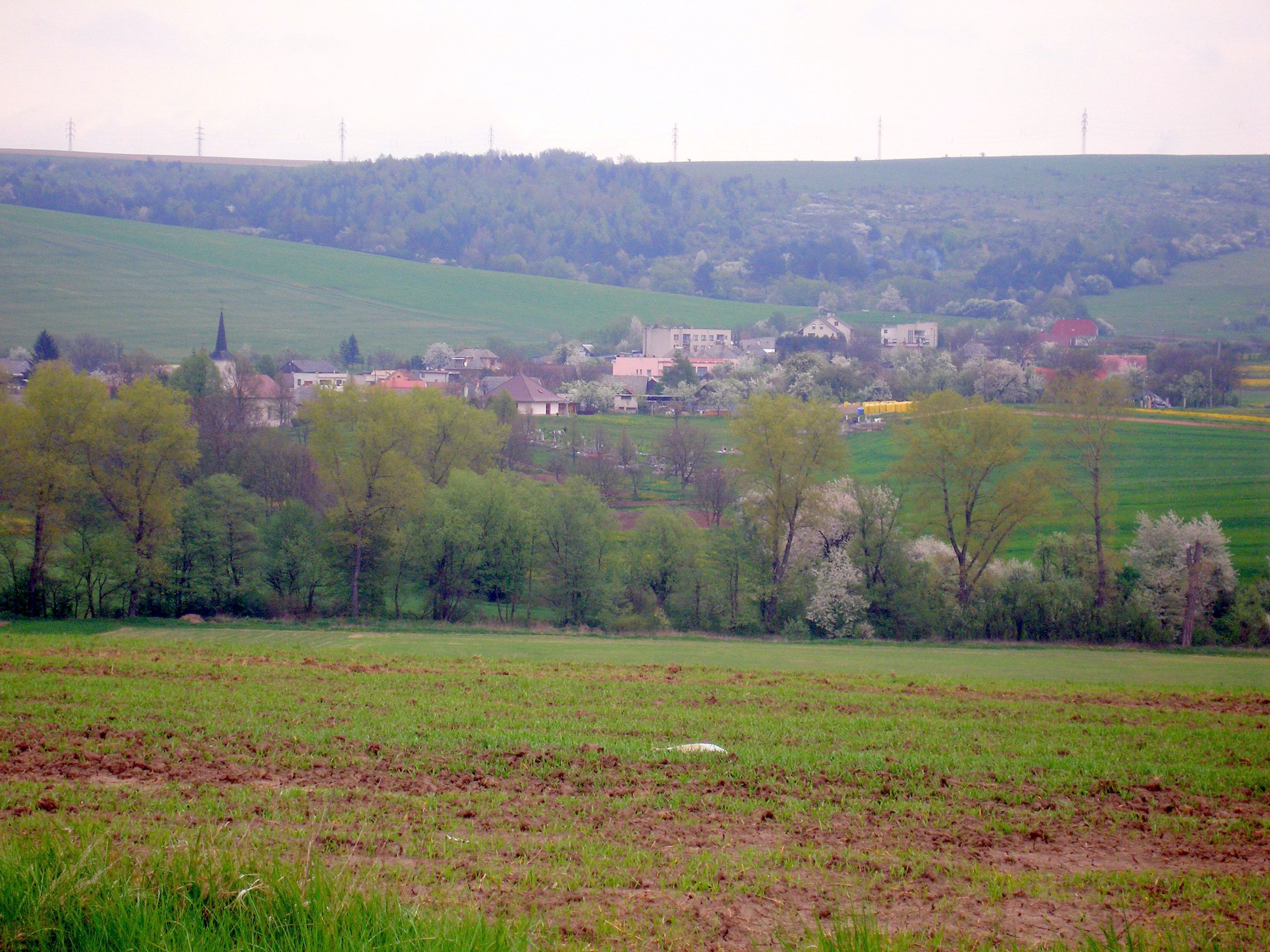

- Flag

- Location of Malý Slivník in the Prešov Region Location of Malý Slivník in Slovakia
- Coordinates: 49.12°N 21.27°E
- Country: Slovakia
- Region: Prešov Region
- District: Prešov District
- First mentioned: 1248

Area
  - Total: 2.60 km^{2} (1.00 sq mi)
- Elevation: 385 m (1,263 ft)

Population (2025)
  - Total: 1,177
- Time zone: UTC+1 (CET)
  - Summer (DST): UTC+2 (CEST)
- Postal code: 826 7
- Area code: +421 51
- Vehicle registration plate (until 2022): PO
- Website: malyslivnik.sk

Malý Slivník is a village and municipality in Prešov District, in eastern Slovakia.

== History ==
The village was first mentioned in 1248.

== Geography ==
The municipality lies at an altitude of 385 metres (1,263 ft) and covers an area of 2.60 km^{2} (1.00 sq mi) (2025).

== Population ==
Population statistic (10 years)
Year	1995	2005	2015	2025
Count	543	735	908	1177
Difference		+35.35%	+23.53%	+29.62%

Population statistic
Year	2024	2025
Count	1122	1177
Difference		+4.90%

It has a population of 1177 people (31 December 2025).

=== Ethnicity ===
Census 2021 (1+ %)
Ethnicity	Number	Fraction
Slovak	869	84.2%
Romani	703	68.12%
Not found out	87	8.43%
Total	1032	

In year 2021 was 1032 people by ethnicity 869 as Slovak, 703 as Romani, 87 as Not found out, 3 as Czech and 1 as Rusyn.

Note on population: The difference values of population numbers in the table "Population statistic" and in the sections "Ethnicity" & "Religion" is caused by the use of various statistical methods.

The vast majority of the municipality's population consists of the local Roma community. In 2019, they constituted an estimated 72% of the local population.

=== Religion ===
Census 2021 (1+ %)
Religion	Number	Fraction
Roman Catholic Church	851	82.46%
Not found out	63	6.1%
Greek Catholic Church	52	5.04%
Christian Congregations in Slovakia	20	1.94%
None	17	1.65%
Total	1032	

In year 2021 was 1032 people by religion 851 from Roman Catholic Church, 63 from Not found out, 52 from Greek Catholic Church, 20 from Christian Congregations in Slovakia, 17 from None, 8 from Calvinist Church, 8 from Eastern Orthodox Church, 5 from Apostolic Church, 3 from Evangelical Church, 2 from Old Catholic Church, 1 from Other, 1 from Church of the Brethren and 1 from Ad hoc movements.
