= Hrabkov =

Hrabkov Harapkó
- Municipality
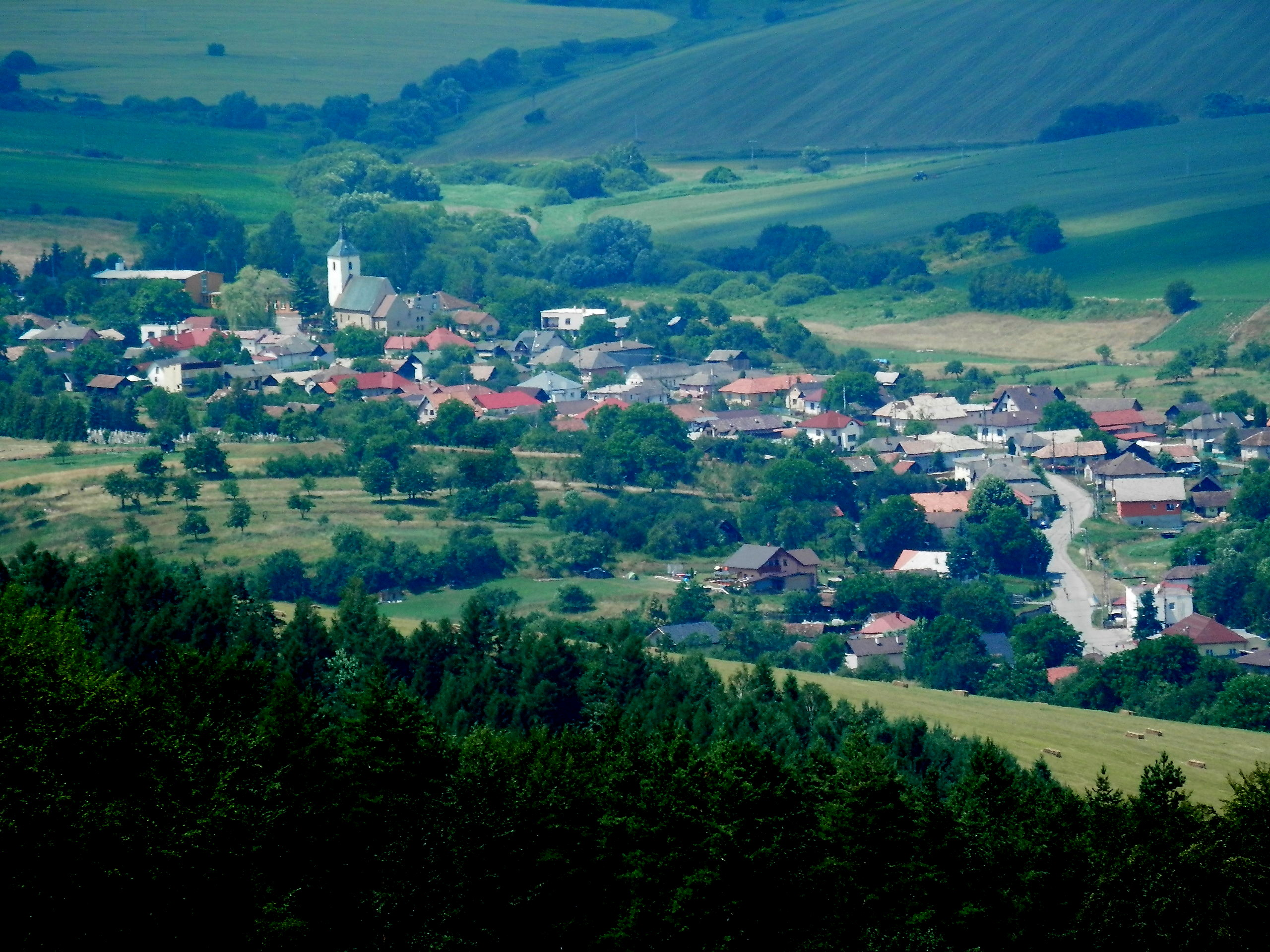

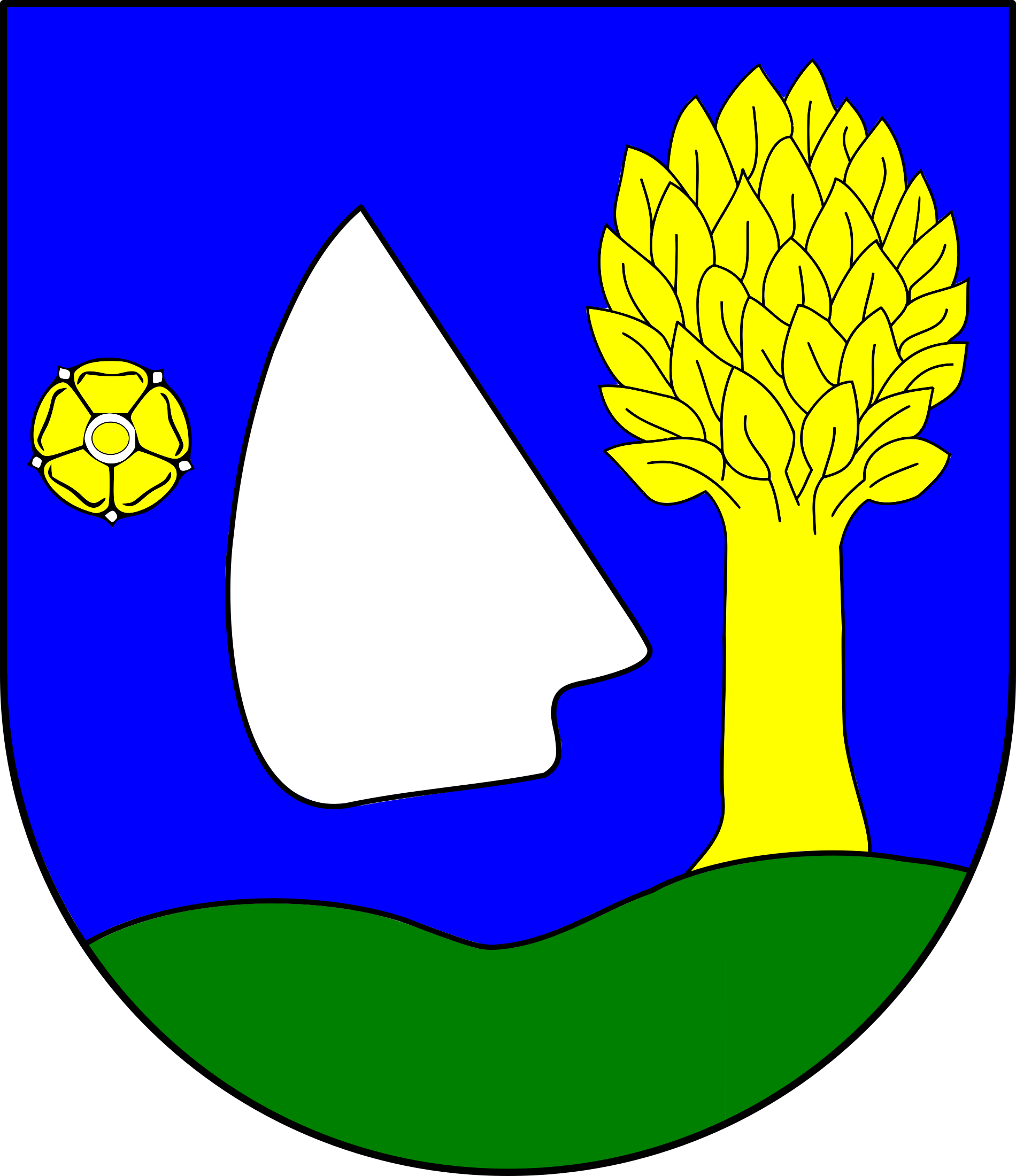
- Flag Coat of arms

- Location of Hrabkov in the Prešov Region Location of Hrabkov in Slovakia
- Coordinates: 48.97°N 21.02°E
- Country: Slovakia
- Region: Prešov Region
- District: Prešov District
- First mentioned: 1330

Area
  - Total: 16.69 km^{2} (6.44 sq mi)
- Elevation: 446 m (1,463 ft)

Population (2025)
  - Total: 737
- Time zone: UTC+1 (CET)
  - Summer (DST): UTC+2 (CEST)
- Postal code: 082 33
- Area code: +421 51
- Vehicle registration plate (until 2022): PO
- Website: www.hrabkov.sk

Hrabkov (Hungarian: Harapkó) is a village and municipality in Prešov District in the Prešov Region of eastern Slovakia.

== History ==
In historical records the village was first mentioned in 1330.

== Geography ==
The municipality lies at an altitude of 446 metres (1,463 ft) and covers an area of 16.69 km^{2} (6.44 sq mi) (2025).

== Population ==
Population statistic (10 years)
Year	1995	2005	2015	2025
Count	766	699	706	737
Difference		−8.74%	+1.00%	+4.39%

Population statistic
Year	2024	2025
Count	735	737
Difference		+0.27%

It has a population of 737 people (31 December 2025).

=== Ethnicity ===
Census 2021 (1+%)
Ethnicity	Number	Fraction
Slovak	680	97.42%
Not found out	17	2.43%
Rusyn	11	1.57%
Total	698	

In year 2021 was 698 people by ethnicity 680 as Slovak, 17 as Not found out, 11 as Rusyn, 2 as Czech, 1 as Italian, 1 as Russian and 1 as Hungarian.

Note on population: The difference values of population numbers in the table "Population statistic" and in the sections "Ethnicity" & "Religion" is caused by the use of various statistical methods.

=== Religion ===
Census 2021 (1+%)
Religion	Number	Fraction
Roman Catholic Church	617	88.4%
None	34	4.87%
Greek Catholic Church	22	3.15%
Not found out	12	1.72%
Total	698	

In year 2021 was 698 people by religion 617 from Roman Catholic Church, 34 from None, 22 from Greek Catholic Church, 12 from Not found out, 4 from Calvinist Church, 4 from Eastern Orthodox Church, 2 from Evangelical Church, 2 from Ad hoc movements and 1 from Other.

== Genealogical resources ==
The records for genealogical research are available at the state archive "Statny Archiv in Presov, Slovakia".

- Roman Catholic church records (births/marriages/deaths): 1792–1895 (parish B)
- Greek Catholic church records (births/marriages/deaths): 1825–1898 (parish B)

== See also ==
- List of municipalities and towns in Slovakia
