= Veľký Slivník =

Village and municipality in Slovakia

- Municipality
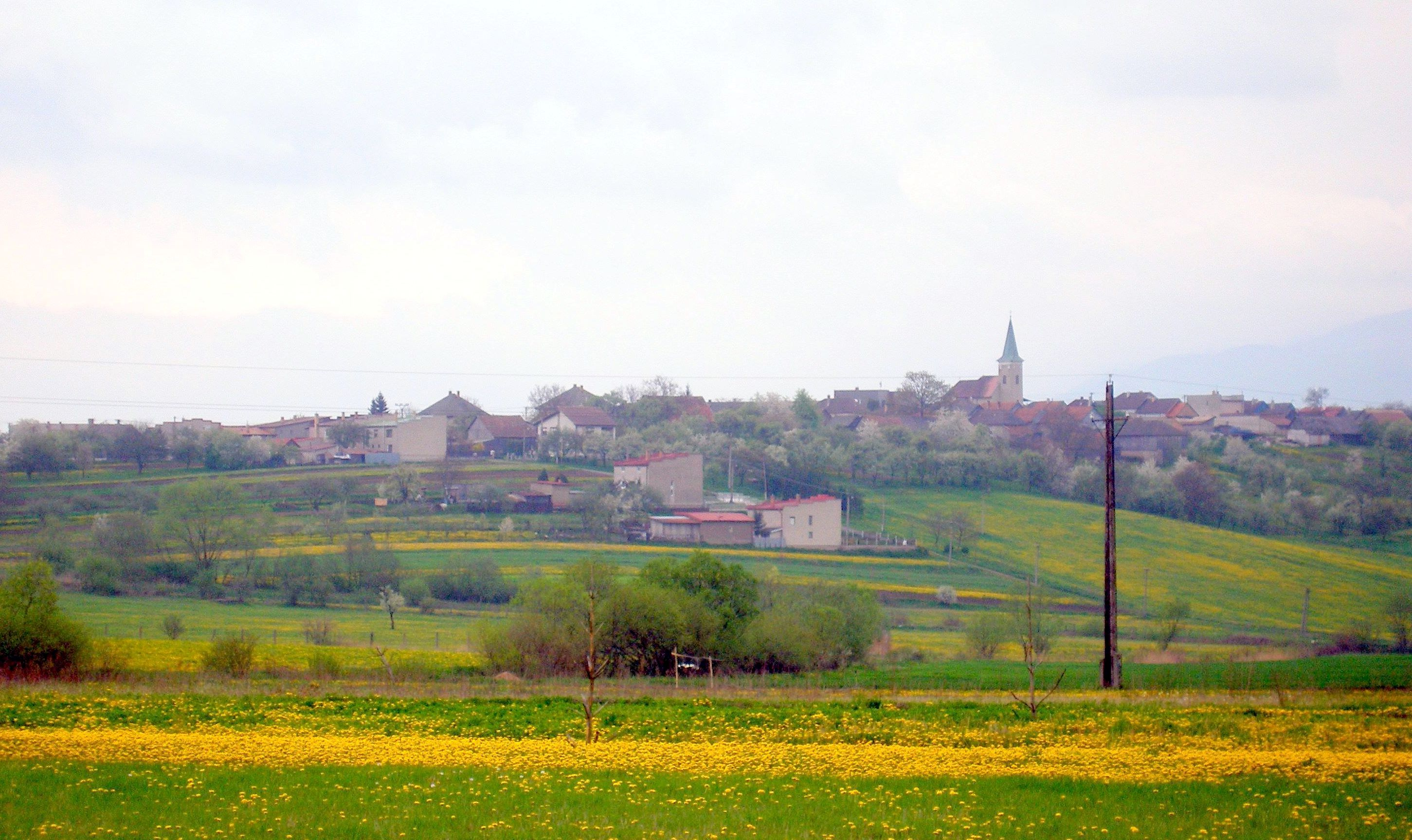

- Flag

- Location of Veľký Slivník in the Prešov Region Location of Veľký Slivník in Slovakia
- Coordinates: 49.12°N 21.28°E
- Country: Slovakia
- Region: Prešov Region
- District: Prešov District
- First mentioned: 1282

Area
  - Total: 6.08 km^{2} (2.35 sq mi)
- Elevation: 391 m (1,283 ft)

Population (2025)
  - Total: 322
- Time zone: UTC+1 (CET)
  - Summer (DST): UTC+2 (CEST)
- Postal code: 826 7
- Area code: +421 54
- Vehicle registration plate (until 2022): PO
- Website: www.velkyslivnik.sk

Veľký Slivník (Hungarian: Nagyszilva) is a village and municipality in Prešov District in the Prešov Region of eastern Slovakia.

== History ==
In historical records the village was first mentioned in 1282.

== Geography ==
The municipality lies at an altitude of 391 metres (1,283 ft) and covers an area of 6.08 km^{2} (2.35 sq mi) (2025).

== Population ==
Population statistic (10 years)
Year	1995	2005	2015	2025
Count	295	318	343	322
Difference		+7.79%	+7.86%	−6.12%

Population statistic
Year	2024	2025
Count	324	322
Difference		−0.61%

It has a population of 322 people (31 December 2025).

=== Ethnicity ===
Census 2021 (1+ %)
Ethnicity	Number	Fraction
Slovak	319	99.06%
Total	322	

In year 2021 was 322 people by ethnicity 319 as Slovak, 3 as Not found out, 2 as Hungarian, 1 as Czech and 1 as Other.

Note on population: The difference values of population numbers in the table "Population statistic" and in the sections "Ethnicity" & "Religion" is caused by the use of various statistical methods.

=== Religion ===
Census 2021 (1+ %)
Religion	Number	Fraction
Roman Catholic Church	295	91.61%
None	17	5.28%
Not found out	4	1.24%
Greek Catholic Church	4	1.24%
Total	322	

In year 2021 was 322 people by religion 295 from Roman Catholic Church, 17 from None, 4 from Not found out, 4 from Greek Catholic Church, 1 from Eastern Orthodox Church and 1 from Ad hoc movements.
