= Kokošovce =

Village and municipality in Slovakia

- Municipality
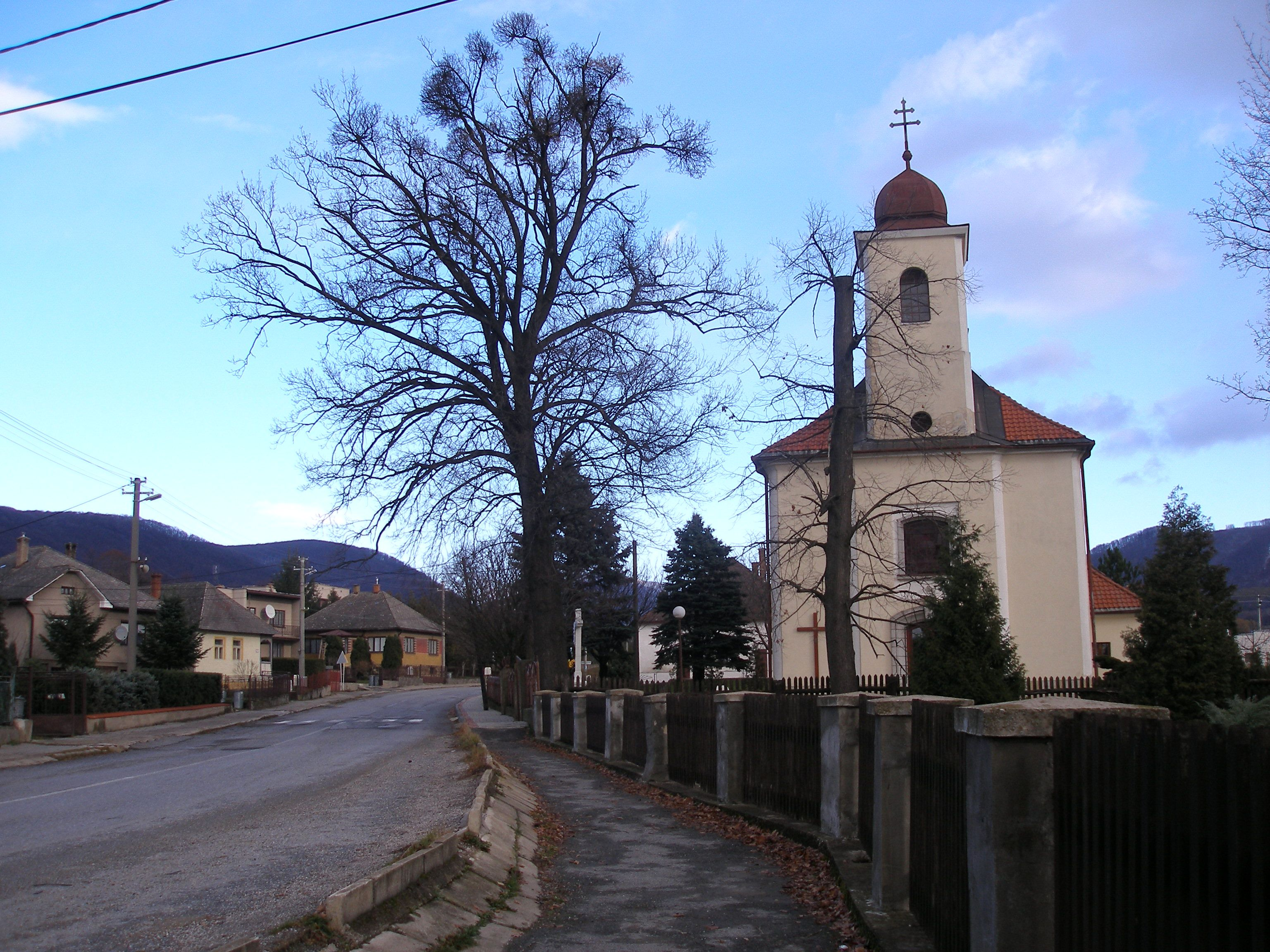

- Flag

- Location of Kokošovce in the Prešov Region Location of Kokošovce in Slovakia
- Coordinates: 48.95°N 21.33°E
- Country: Slovakia
- Region: Prešov Region
- District: Prešov District
- First mentioned: 1272

Area
  - Total: 11.31 km^{2} (4.37 sq mi)
- Elevation: 424 m (1,391 ft)

Population (2025)
  - Total: 947
- Time zone: UTC+1 (CET)
  - Summer (DST): UTC+2 (CEST)
- Postal code: 825 2
- Area code: +421 51
- Vehicle registration plate (until 2022): PO
- Website: www.kokosovce.sk

Kokošovce (Hungarian: Delnekakasfalva) is a village and municipality in Prešov District in the Prešov Region of eastern Slovakia.

== History ==
In historical records the village was first mentioned in 1272.

== Geography ==
The municipality lies at an altitude of 424 metres (1,391 ft) and covers an area of 11.31 km^{2} (4.37 sq mi) (2025).

== Population ==
Population statistic (10 years)
Year	1995	2005	2015	2025
Count	627	672	812	947
Difference		+7.17%	+20.83%	+16.62%

Population statistic
Year	2024	2025
Count	937	947
Difference		+1.06%

It has a population of 947 people (31 December 2025).

=== Ethnicity ===
Census 2021 (1+ %)
Ethnicity	Number	Fraction
Slovak	896	98.03%
Rusyn	13	1.42%
Total	914	

In year 2021 was 914 people by ethnicity 896 as Slovak, 13 as Rusyn, 9 as Czech, 9 as Not found out, 3 as Polish, 3 as Other, 2 as Ukrainian, 2 as Romani, 2 as Russian, 1 as Hungarian and 1 as Croatian.

Note on population: The difference values of population numbers in the table "Population statistic" and in the sections "Ethnicity" & "Religion" is caused by the use of various statistical methods.

=== Religion ===
Census 2021 (1+ %)
Religion	Number	Fraction
Roman Catholic Church	756	82.71%
None	79	8.64%
Greek Catholic Church	33	3.61%
Evangelical Church	21	2.3%
Total	914	

In year 2021 was 914 people by religion 756 from Roman Catholic Church, 79 from None, 33 from Greek Catholic Church, 21 from Evangelical Church, 8 from Not found out, 4 from Eastern Orthodox Church, 4 from Seventh-day Adventist Church, 3 from Bahá'i Community, 2 from Christian Congregations in Slovakia, 1 from Jewish community, 1 from Other and not ascertained christian church, 1 from Other and 1 from Ad hoc movements.

== Genealogical resources ==
The records for genealogical research are available at the state archive "Statny Archiv in Presov, Slovakia"

- Roman Catholic church records (births/marriages/deaths): 1814–1895 (parish A)
- Greek Catholic church records (births/marriages/deaths): 1762–1895 (parish B)
- Lutheran church records (births/marriages/deaths): 1768–1898 (parish B)

== See also ==
- List of municipalities and towns in Slovakia
