= Šindliar =

Village and municipality in Slovakia

- Municipality
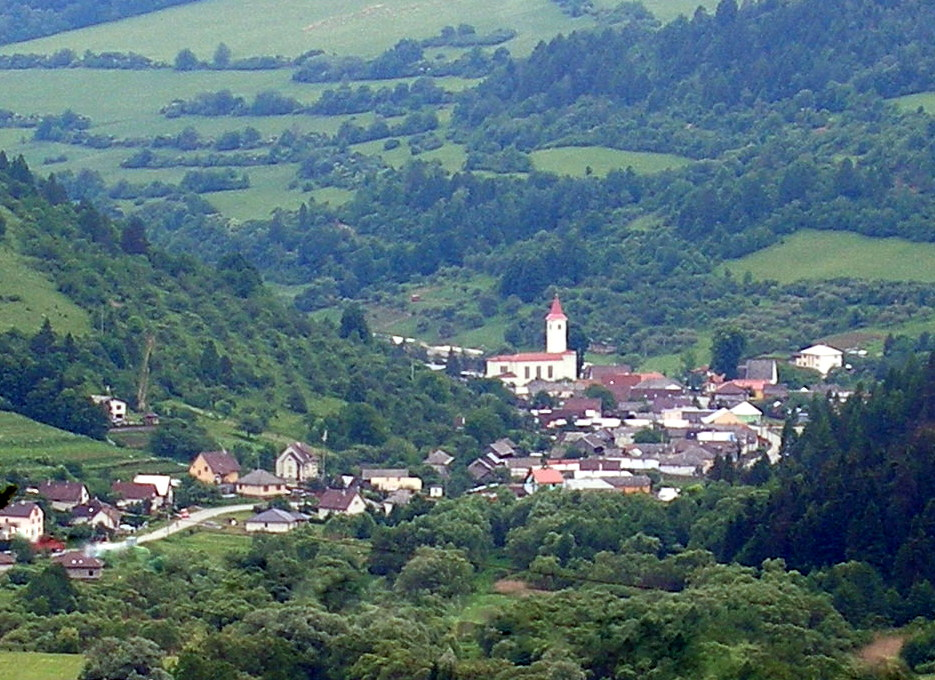

- Flag

- Location of Šindliar in the Prešov Region Location of Šindliar in Slovakia
- Coordinates: 49.03°N 20.95°E
- Country: Slovakia
- Region: Prešov Region
- District: Prešov District
- First mentioned: 1331

Area
  - Total: 11.32 km^{2} (4.37 sq mi)
- Elevation: 493 m (1,617 ft)

Population (2025)
  - Total: 573
- Time zone: UTC+1 (CET)
  - Summer (DST): UTC+2 (CEST)
- Postal code: 823 6
- Area code: +421 51
- Vehicle registration plate (until 2022): PO
- Website: www.sindliar.sk

Šindliar (Hungarian: Singlér) is a village and municipality in Prešov District in the Prešov Region of eastern Slovakia.

== History ==
In historical records the village was first mentioned in 1331.

== Geography ==
The municipality lies at an altitude of 493 metres (1,617 ft) and covers an area of 11.32 km^{2} (4.37 sq mi) (2025).

== Population ==
Population statistic (10 years)
Year	1995	2005	2015	2025
Count	524	541	546	573
Difference		+3.24%	+0.92%	+4.94%

Population statistic
Year	2024	2025
Count	571	573
Difference		+0.35%

It has a population of 573 people (31 December 2025).

=== Ethnicity ===
Census 2021 (1+ %)
Ethnicity	Number	Fraction
Slovak	546	98.02%
Romani	98	17.59%
Not found out	6	1.07%
Total	557	

In year 2021 was 557 people by ethnicity 546 as Slovak, 98 as Romani, 6 as Not found out, 3 as Czech and 1 as Other.

Note on population: The difference values of population numbers in the table "Population statistic" and in the sections "Ethnicity" & "Religion" is caused by the use of various statistical methods.

=== Religion ===
Census 2021 (1+ %)
Religion	Number	Fraction
Roman Catholic Church	513	92.1%
None	17	3.05%
Greek Catholic Church	11	1.97%
Not found out	6	1.08%
Total	557	

In year 2021 was 557 people by religion 513 from Roman Catholic Church, 17 from None, 11 from Greek Catholic Church, 6 from Not found out, 4 from Evangelical Church, 2 from Calvinist Church, 2 from Jehovah's Witnesses and 2 from Christian Congregations in Slovakia.
