= Hermanovce =

- Municipality
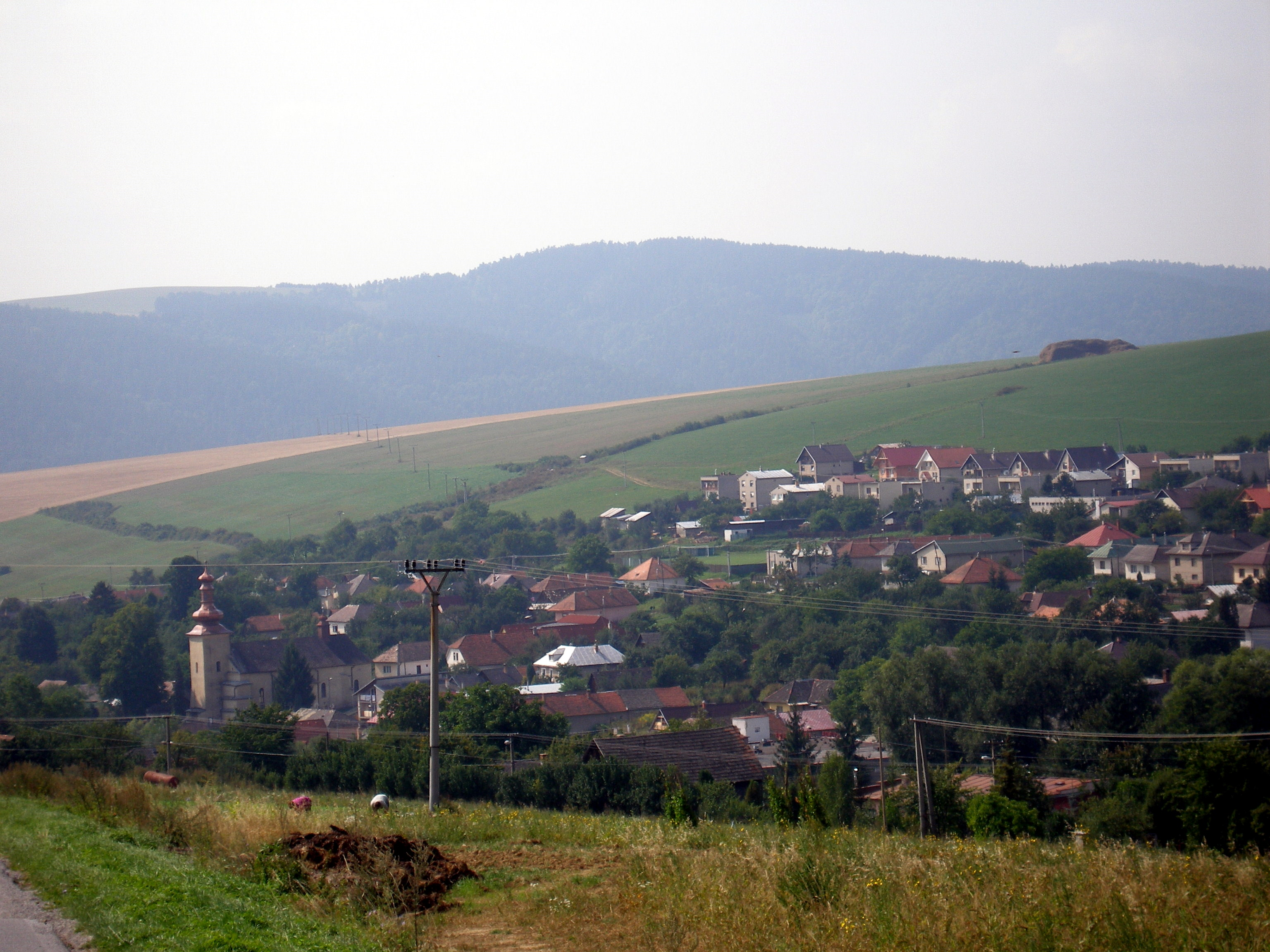

- Flag

- Location of Hermanovce in the Prešov Region Location of Hermanovce in Slovakia
- Coordinates: 49.05°N 21.02°E
- Country: Slovakia
- Region: Prešov Region
- District: Prešov District
- First mentioned: 1320

Area
  - Total: 15.96 km^{2} (6.16 sq mi)
- Elevation: 465 m (1,526 ft)

Population (2025)
  - Total: 1,791
- Time zone: UTC+1 (CET)
  - Summer (DST): UTC+2 (CEST)
- Postal code: 823 5
- Area code: +421 51
- Vehicle registration plate (until 2022): PO
- Website: www.obechermanovce.sk

Hermanovce (Hungarian: Sztankahermány) is a village and municipality in Prešov District in the Prešov Region of eastern Slovakia.

== History ==
In historical records the village was first mentioned in 1320.

== Geography ==
The municipality lies at an altitude of 465 metres (1,526 ft) and covers an area of 15.96 km^{2} (6.16 sq mi) (2025).

== Population ==
Population statistic (10 years)
Year	1995	2005	2015	2025
Count	1377	1532	1909	1791
Difference		+11.25%	+24.60%	−6.18%

Population statistic
Year	2024	2025
Count	1738	1791
Difference		+3.04%

It has a population of 1791 people (31 December 2025).

=== Ethnicity ===
Census 2021 (1+ %)
Ethnicity	Number	Fraction
Slovak	1559	94.02%
Romani	433	26.11%
Not found out	94	5.66%
Total	1658	

In year 2021 was 1658 people by ethnicity 1559 as Slovak, 433 as Romani, 94 as Not found out, 6 as Rusyn, 4 as Hungarian, 3 as Czech, 2 as Other, 1 as Russian and 1 as German.

Note on population: The difference values of population numbers in the table "Population statistic" and in the sections "Ethnicity" & "Religion" is caused by the use of various statistical methods.

=== Religion ===
Census 2021 (1+ %)
Religion	Number	Fraction
Roman Catholic Church	1479	89.2%
Not found out	87	5.25%
None	54	3.26%
Greek Catholic Church	18	1.09%
Total	1658	

In year 2021 was 1658 people by religion 1479 from Roman Catholic Church, 87 from Not found out, 54 from None, 18 from Greek Catholic Church, 6 from Evangelical Church, 4 from Christian Congregations in Slovakia, 3 from Ad hoc movements, 2 from Old Catholic Church, 2 from Calvinist Church, 1 from Other and not ascertained christian church, 1 from Other and 1 from Seventh-day Adventist Church.

== Genealogical resources ==
The records for genealogical research are available at the state archive "Statny Archiv in Presov, Slovakia"

- Roman Catholic church records (births/marriages/deaths): 1772–1895 (parish A)
- Greek Catholic church records (births/marriages/deaths): 1834–1895 (parish B)

== See also ==
- List of municipalities and towns in Slovakia
