= Bajerov =

- Municipality
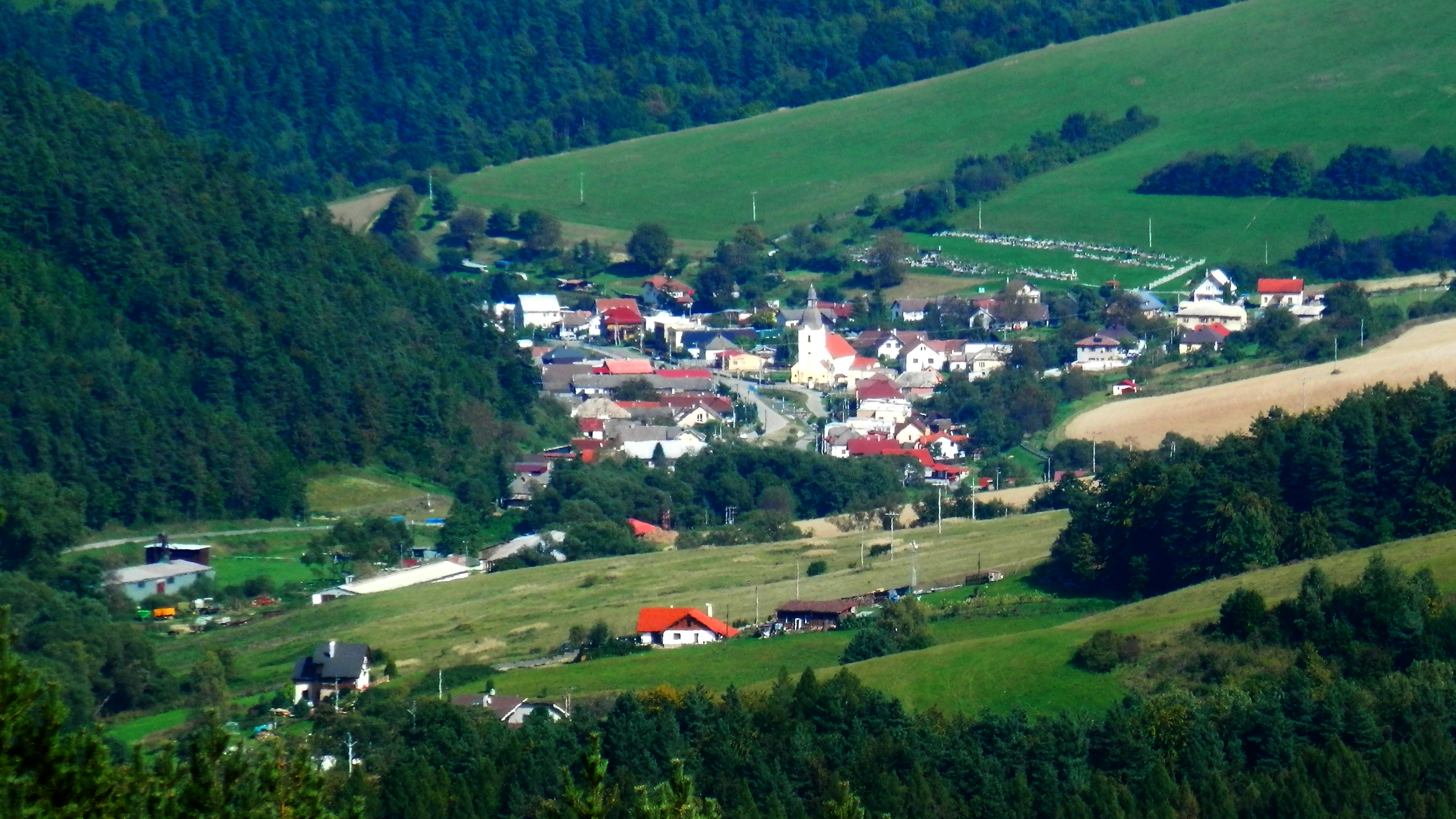

- Flag

- Location of Bajerov in the Prešov Region Location of Bajerov in Slovakia
- Coordinates: 48.95°N 21.12°E
- Country: Slovakia
- Region: Prešov Region
- District: Prešov District
- First mentioned: 1332

Area
  - Total: 6.62 km^{2} (2.56 sq mi)
- Elevation: 349 m (1,145 ft)

Population (2025)
  - Total: 414
- Time zone: UTC+1 (CET)
  - Summer (DST): UTC+2 (CEST)
- Postal code: 824 1
- Area code: +421 51
- Vehicle registration plate (until 2022): PO
- Website: www.bajerov.sk

Bajerov (German: Bayersdorf; Hungarian: Bajor; Rusyn: Баєров) is a village and municipality in Prešov District in the Prešov Region of eastern Slovakia. The municipality lies at an altitude of 344 metres and covers an area of 6.62 km^{2} (2.56 sq mi) (2025-06-30/-07-01).

== Geography ==
The municipality lies at an altitude of 349 metres (1,145 ft) and covers an area of 6.62 km^{2} (2.56 sq mi) (2025).

== Population ==
Population statistic (10 years)
Year	1995	2005	2015	2025
Count	434	443	449	414
Difference		+2.07%	+1.35%	−7.79%

Population statistic
Year	2024	2025
Count	409	414
Difference		+1.22%

It has a population of 414 people (31 December 2025).

=== Ethnicity ===
Census 2021 (1+ %)
Ethnicity	Number	Fraction
Slovak	414	98.57%
Not found out	5	1.19%
Total	420	

In year 2021 was 420 people by ethnicity 414 as Slovak, 5 as Not found out, 3 as Czech, 2 as Other, 1 as Polish and 1 as Greek.

Note on population: The difference values of population numbers in the table "Population statistic" and in the sections "Ethnicity" & "Religion" is caused by the use of various statistical methods.

=== Religion ===
Census 2021 (1+ %)
Religion	Number	Fraction
Roman Catholic Church	380	90.48%
None	17	4.05%
Greek Catholic Church	11	2.62%
Evangelical Church	6	1.43%
Not found out	5	1.19%
Total	420	

In year 2021 was 420 people by religion 380 from Roman Catholic Church, 17 from None, 11 from Greek Catholic Church, 6 from Evangelical Church, 5 from Not found out and 1 from Eastern Orthodox Church.

== Genealogical resources ==
The records for genealogical research are available at the state archive in Prešov (Slovak: Štátny archív v Prešove).

- Roman Catholic church records (births/marriages/deaths): 1798–1896 (parish A)
- Greek Catholic church records (births/marriages/deaths): 1825–1897
- Census records 1869 of Bajerov are available at the state archive.

== See also ==
- List of municipalities and towns in Slovakia
