= Prešov District =

Coordinates: 49°0′6″N 21°14′24″E

- District
- Country: Slovakia
- Region (kraj): Prešov Region
- Seat: Prešov

Area
  - Total: 933.95 km^{2} (360.60 sq mi)

Population (2025)
  - Total: 176,096
- Time zone: UTC+1 (CET)
  - Summer (DST): UTC+2 (CEST)
- Telephone prefix: 051
- Vehicle registration plate (until 2022): PO
- Municipalities: 91

Prešov District (okres Prešov) is a district in the Prešov Region of eastern Slovakia.

Until 1918, the district was part of the county of Kingdom of Hungary of Sáros.

Historical population
Year	Pop.	±%
1970	117,867	—
1980	135,265	+14.8%
1991	151,045	+11.7%
2001	161,782	+7.1%
2011	169,423	+4.7%
2021	172,804	+2.0%
Source: Censuses

== Population ==
Population statistic (10 years)
Year	1995	2005	2015	2025
Count	157,670	164,331	172,536	176,096
Difference		+4.22%	+4.99%	+2.06%

Population statistic
Year	2024	2025
Count	175,447	176,096
Difference		+0.36%

It has a population of 176,096 people (31 December 2025).

=== Ethnicity ===
Census 2021 (1+ %)
Ethnicity	Number	Fraction
Slovak	159,267	85.59%
Romani	9660	5.19%
Not found out	9475	5.09%
Rusyn	3414	1.83%
Total	186,078	

In year 2021 was 186,078 people by ethnicity 159,267 as Slovak, 9660 as Romani, 9475 as Not found out, 3414 as Rusyn, 1061 as Czech, 869 as Ukrainian, 602 as Other, 350 as Hungarian, 302 as Polish, 216 as Russian, 164 as German, 92 as Italian, 68 as English, 56 as Jewish, 56 as Bulgarian, 50 as Vietnamese, 50 as French, 48 as Irish, 44 as Moravian, 37 as Albanian, 33 as Chinese, 31 as Croatian, 29 as Canadian, 27 as Greek, 25 as Austrian, 17 as Serbian, 16 as Turkish, 11 as Romanian, 7 as Silesian and 1 as Iranian.

Note on population: The difference values of population numbers in the table "Population statistic" and in the sections "Ethnicity" & "Religion" is caused by the use of various statistical methods.

=== Religion ===
Census 2021 (1+ %)
Religion	Number	Fraction
Roman Catholic Church	112,645	65.19%
None	23,255	13.46%
Greek Catholic Church	13,529	7.83%
Not found out	10,238	5.92%
Evangelical Church	7874	4.56%
Total	172,804	

In year 2021 was 172,804 people by religion 112,645 from Roman Catholic Church, 23,255 from None, 13,529 from Greek Catholic Church, 10,238 from Not found out, 7874 from Evangelical Church, 1714 from Eastern Orthodox Church, 639 from Apostolic Church, 413 from Ad hoc movements, 403 from Christian Congregations in Slovakia, 358 from Other, 337 from Church of the Brethren, 289 from Jehovah's Witnesses, 242 from Other and not ascertained christian church, 206 from Calvinist Church, 149 from Seventh-day Adventist Church, 109 from Paganism and natural spirituality, 107 from Buddhism, 78 from Islam, 48 from United Methodist Church, 46 from Jewish community, 46 from Baptists Church, 33 from Old Catholic Church, 25 from Hinduism, 12 from Church of Jesus Christ of Latter-day Saints, 5 from Bahá'i Community, 2 from New Apostolic Church and 2 from Czechoslovak Hussite Church.

== Municipalities ==
Municipality	Area [km^{2}]	Population
Abranovce	9.58	741
Bajerov	6.62	414
Bertotovce	8.49	518
Brestov	10.36	456
Bretejovce	4.37	475
Brežany	3.30	211
Bzenov	3.19	783
Čelovce	3.99	394
Červenica	17.81	1,121
Demjata	11.49	1,077
Drienov	20.29	2,275
Drienovská Nová Ves	6.48	922
Dulova Ves	6.07	1,889
Fintice	11.24	2,687
Fričovce	8.57	1,118
Fulianka	3.80	422
Geraltov	10.69	110
Gregorovce	9.84	947
Haniska	1.90	738
Hendrichovce	4.22	286
Hermanovce	15.96	1,791
Hrabkov	16.69	737
Chmeľov	12.63	1,075
Chmeľovec	7.28	485
Chmiňany	7.49	1,089
Chminianska Nová Ves	10.57	1,283
Chminianske Jakubovany	14.22	3,327
Janovík	2.38	467
Janov	4.71	309
Kapušany	11.57	2,152
Kendice	9.34	2,103
Klenov	15.36	228
Kojatice	10.68	1,176
Kokošovce	11.31	947
Krížovany	9.35	340
Kvačany	5.11	292
Lada	3.09	842
Lažany	1.31	161
Lemešany	9.19	2,065
Lesíček	6.71	452
Ličartovce	8.28	967
Lipníky	3.79	599
Lipovce	22.37	512
Ľubotice	8.30	4,134
Ľubovec	15.45	545
Lúčina	1.86	154
Malý Slivník	2.60	1,177
Malý Šariš	8.61	1,901
Medzany	7.07	1,125
Miklušovce	7.22	280
Mirkovce	9.55	1,480
Mošurov	5.44	196
Nemcovce	5.73	476
Okružná	11.51	555
Ondrašovce	4.35	62
Ovčie	3.15	678
Petrovany	17.50	2,042
Podhorany	7.11	888
Podhradík	10.56	434
Prešov	71.09	81,223
Proč	5.85	403
Pušovce	4.36	567
Radatice	19.27	788
Rokycany	5.78	1,105
Ruská Nová Ves	12.57	1,420
Sedlice	15.56	925
Seniakovce	2.57	207
Suchá Dolina	6.12	193
Svinia	14.73	2,767
Šarišská Poruba	5.98	732
Šarišská Trstená	1.84	385
Šarišské Bohdanovce	9.36	1,025
Šindliar	11.32	573
Široké	25.78	2,450
Štefanovce	5.25	202
Teriakovce	3.18	1,284
Terňa	29.42	1,335
Trnkov	1.79	369
Tuhrina	13.25	563
Tulčík	12.81	1,321
Varhaňovce	8.33	1,607
Veľký Slivník	6.08	322
Veľký Šariš	25.69	7,035
Víťaz	19.30	2,043
Vyšná Šebastová	9.82	1,347
Záborské	5.38	1,243
Záhradné	8.83	1,177
Zlatá Baňa	31.73	439
Žehňa	16.75	1,431
Žipov	7.64	285
Župčany	8.49	2,220

Population and area values are current for year 2025.
