= Chminianske Jakubovany =

Municipality of Slovakia

- Municipality
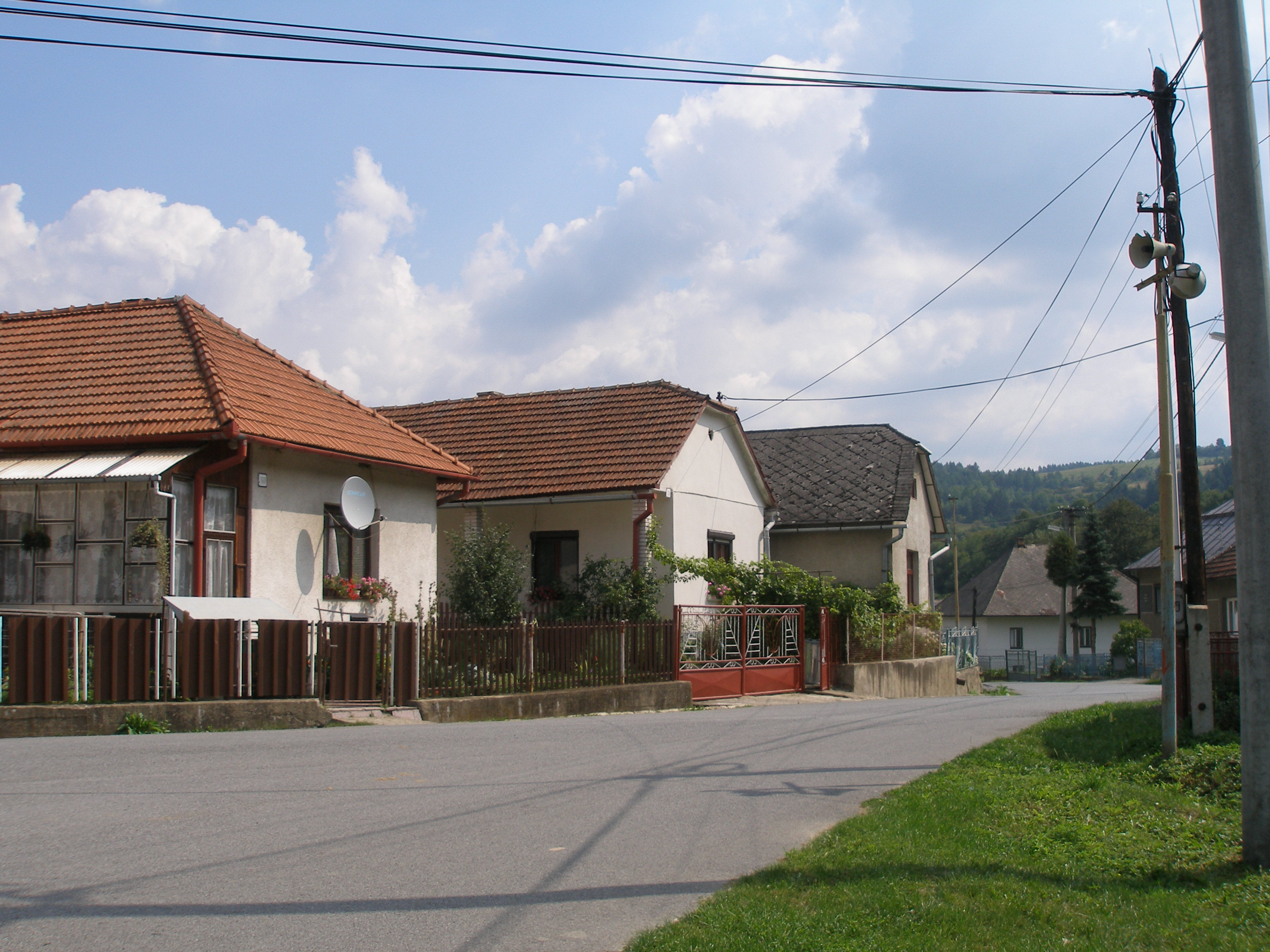

- Flag

- Location of Chminianske Jakubovany in the Prešov Region Location of Chminianske Jakubovany in Slovakia
- Coordinates: 48.98°N 21.00°E
- Country: Slovakia
- Region: Prešov Region
- District: Prešov District
- First mentioned: 1334

Area
  - Total: 14.22 km^{2} (5.49 sq mi)
- Elevation: 425 m (1,394 ft)

Population (2025)
  - Total: 3,327
- Time zone: UTC+1 (CET)
  - Summer (DST): UTC+2 (CEST)
- Postal code: 823 3
- Area code: +421 51
- Vehicle registration plate (until 2022): PO
- Website: www.chminianskejakubovany.sk

Chminianske Jakubovany (Hungarian: Jakabvágása) is a village and municipality in Prešov District in the Prešov Region of eastern Slovakia.

== History ==
In historical records the village was first mentioned in 1334.

== Geography ==
The municipality lies at an altitude of 425 metres (1,394 ft) and covers an area of 14.22 km^{2} (5.49 sq mi) (2025).

== Population ==
Population statistic (10 years)
Year	1995	2005	2015	2025
Count	1166	1686	2188	3327
Difference		+44.59%	+29.77%	+52.05%

Population statistic
Year	2024	2025
Count	3215	3327
Difference		+3.48%

It has a population of 3327 people (31 December 2025).

=== Ethnicity ===
Census 2021 (1+ %)
Ethnicity	Number	Fraction
Slovak	2450	88.28%
Romani	331	11.92%
Not found out	293	10.55%
Total	2775	

In year 2021 was 2775 people by ethnicity 2450 as Slovak, 331 as Romani, 293 as Not found out, 2 as Czech, 2 as Hungarian, 1 as Rusyn and 1 as Russian.

Note on population: The difference values of population numbers in the table "Population statistic" and in the sections "Ethnicity" & "Religion" is caused by the use of various statistical methods.

The vast majority of the municipality's population consists of the local Roma community. In 2019, they constituted an estimated 90% of the local population.

=== Religion ===
Census 2021 (1+ %)
Religion	Number	Fraction
Roman Catholic Church	2005	72.25%
Not found out	273	9.84%
None	247	8.9%
Evangelical Church	184	6.63%
Greek Catholic Church	52	1.87%
Total	2775	

In year 2021 was 2775 people by religion 2005 from Roman Catholic Church, 273 from Not found out, 247 from None, 184 from Evangelical Church, 52 from Greek Catholic Church, 9 from Christian Congregations in Slovakia, 1 from Calvinist Church, 1 from Eastern Orthodox Church, 1 from Other and not ascertained christian church, 1 from Baptists Church and 1 from Ad hoc movements.

== Genealogical resources ==
The records for genealogical research are available at the state archive "Statny Archiv in Presov, Slovakia"

- Roman Catholic church records (births/marriages/deaths): 1792–1895 (parish B)
- Greek Catholic church records (births/marriages/deaths): 1825–1898 (parish B)
- Lutheran church records (births/marriages/deaths): 1753–1895 (parish A)

== See also ==
- List of municipalities and towns in Slovakia
