= Dulova Ves =

Village and municipality in Slovakia

- Municipality
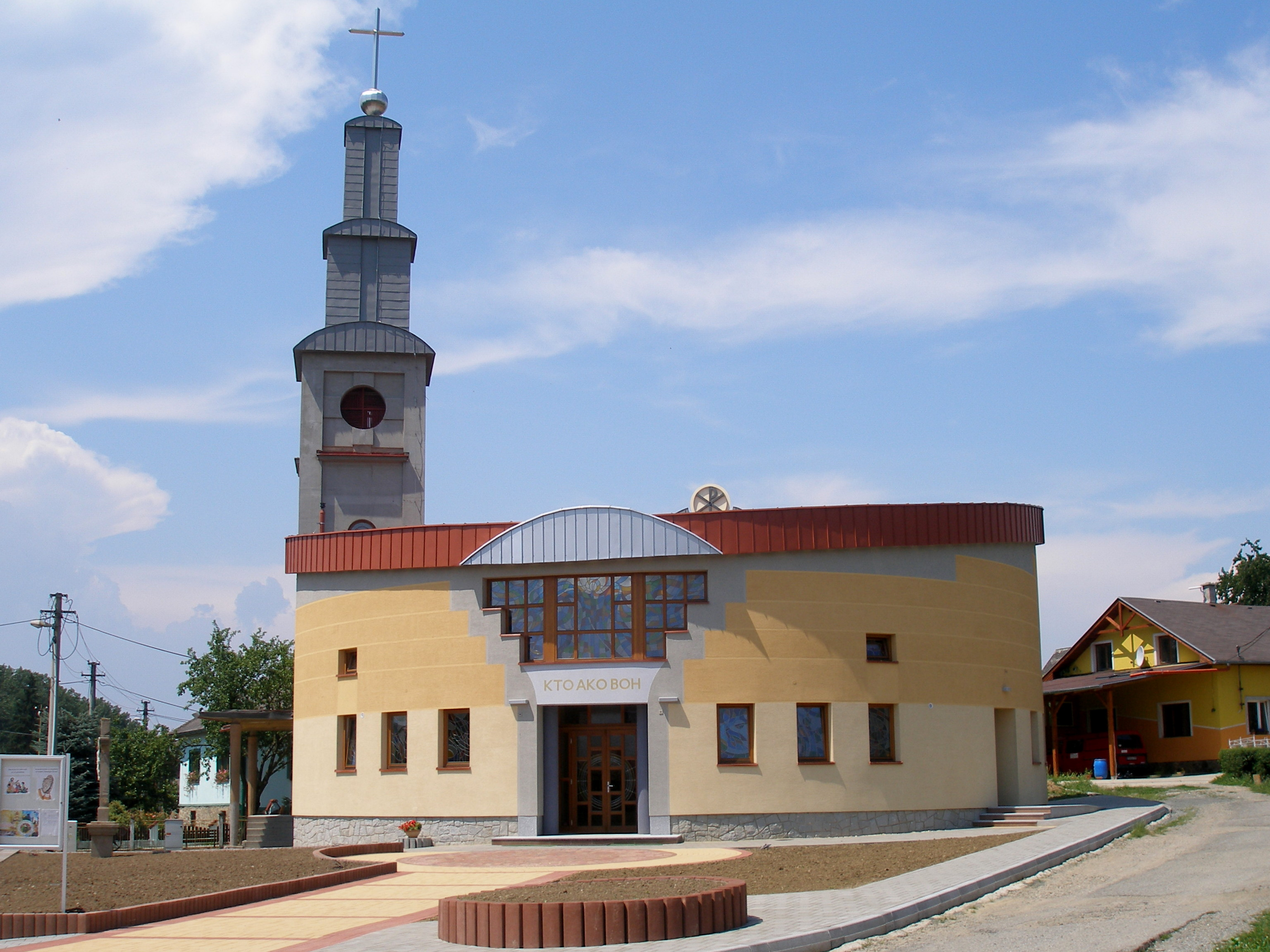

- Flag

- Location of Dulova Ves in the Prešov Region Location of Dulova Ves in Slovakia
- Coordinates: 48.95°N 21.30°E
- Country: Slovakia
- Region: Prešov Region
- District: Prešov District
- First mentioned: 1417

Area
  - Total: 6.07 km^{2} (2.34 sq mi)
- Elevation: 314 m (1,030 ft)

Population (2025)
  - Total: 1,889
- Time zone: UTC+1 (CET)
  - Summer (DST): UTC+2 (CEST)
- Postal code: 825 2
- Area code: +421 51
- Vehicle registration plate (until 2022): PO
- Website: www.dulovaves.sk

Dulova Ves (Hungarian: Sósgyülvész) is a village and municipality in Prešov District in the Prešov Region of eastern Slovakia.

== History ==
In historical records the village was first mentioned in 1417.

== Geography ==
The municipality lies at an altitude of 314 metres (1,030 ft) and covers an area of 6.07 km^{2} (2.34 sq mi) (2025).

== Population ==
Population statistic (10 years)
Year	1995	2005	2015	2025
Count	537	630	887	1889
Difference		+17.31%	+40.79%	+112.96%

Population statistic
Year	2024	2025
Count	1870	1889
Difference		+1.01%

It has a population of 1889 people (31 December 2025).

=== Ethnicity ===
Census 2021 (1+ %)
Ethnicity	Number	Fraction
Slovak	1390	97.74%
Not found out	26	1.82%
Rusyn	19	1.33%
Total	1422	

In year 2021 was 1422 people by ethnicity 1390 as Slovak, 26 as Not found out, 19 as Rusyn, 9 as Czech, 4 as Ukrainian, 4 as Romani, 3 as Jewish, 3 as Irish, 3 as Hungarian, 2 as Italian, 1 as Turkish, 1 as Russian, 1 as Polish, 1 as German and 1 as Other.

Note on population: The difference values of population numbers in the table "Population statistic" and in the sections "Ethnicity" & "Religion" is caused by the use of various statistical methods.

=== Religion ===
Census 2021 (1+ %)
Religion	Number	Fraction
Roman Catholic Church	1009	70.96%
None	205	14.42%
Greek Catholic Church	86	6.05%
Evangelical Church	76	5.34%
Not found out	16	1.13%
Total	1422	

In year 2021 was 1422 people by religion 1009 from Roman Catholic Church, 205 from None, 86 from Greek Catholic Church, 76 from Evangelical Church, 16 from Not found out, 9 from Eastern Orthodox Church, 8 from Church of the Brethren, 7 from Other, 2 from Calvinist Church, 1 from Christian Congregations in Slovakia, 1 from Islam, 1 from Hinduism and 1 from Baptists Church.

== Genealogical resources ==
The records for genealogical research are available at the state archive "Statny Archiv in Kosice, Presov, Slovakia"

- Roman Catholic church records (births/marriages/deaths): 1814–1895 (parish B)
- Greek Catholic church records (births/marriages/deaths): 1762–1895 (parish B)
- Lutheran church records (births/marriages/deaths): 1768–1898 (parish B)

== See also ==
- List of municipalities and towns in Slovakia
