= Kvačany, Prešov District =

Municipality of Slovakia in Prešov district

Kvačany
- Municipality
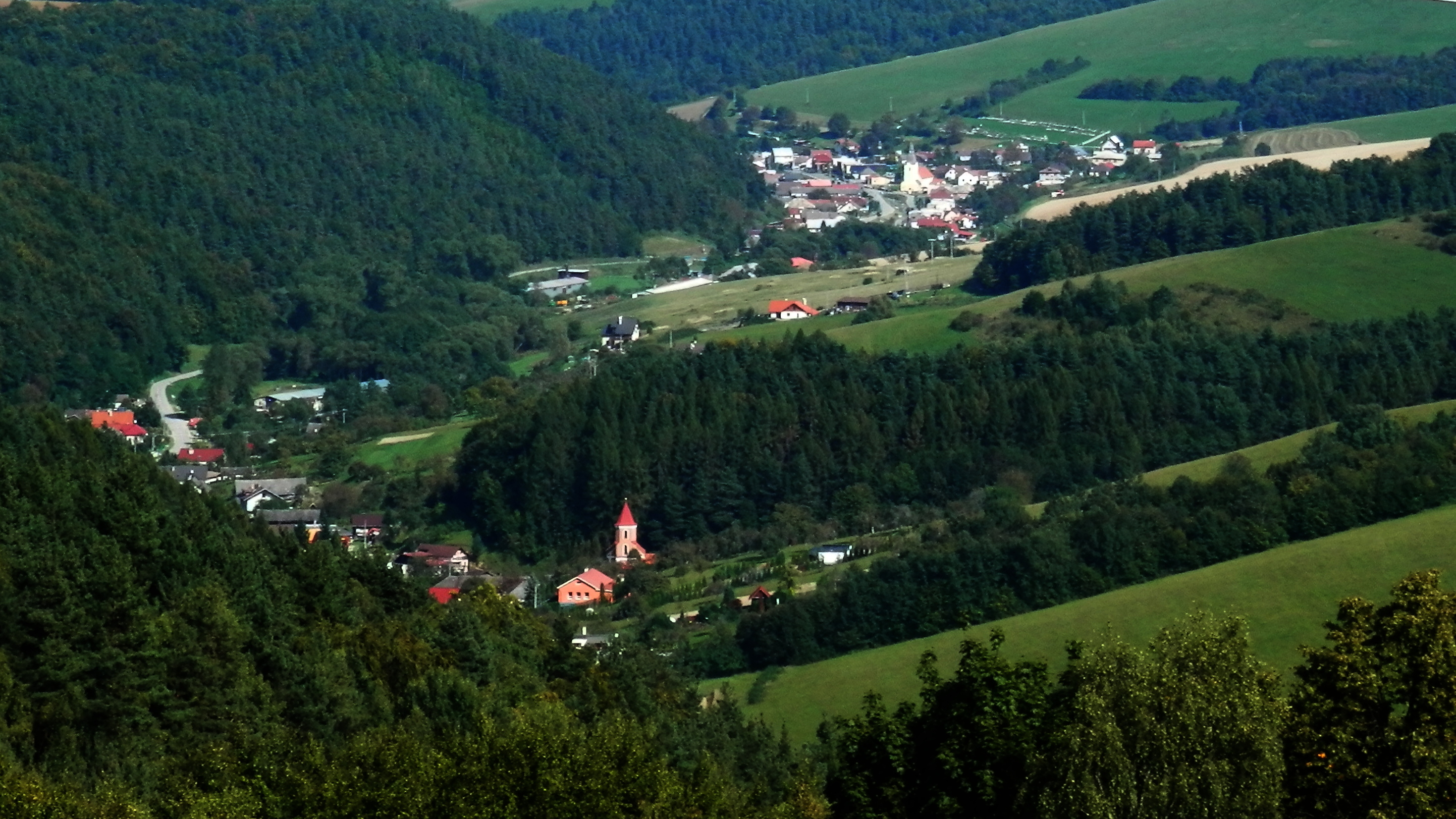

- Flag

- Location of Kvačany in the Prešov Region Location of Kvačany in Slovakia
- Coordinates: 48.95°N 21.09°E
- Country: Slovakia
- Region: Prešov Region
- District: Prešov District
- First mentioned: 1626

Area
  - Total: 5.11 km^{2} (1.97 sq mi)
- Elevation: 389 m (1,276 ft)

Population (2025)
  - Total: 292
- Time zone: UTC+1 (CET)
  - Summer (DST): UTC+2 (CEST)
- Postal code: 824 1
- Area code: +421 51
- Vehicle registration plate (until 2022): PO

Kvačany (Hungarian: Kvačany) is a village and municipality in Prešov District in the Prešov Region of eastern Slovakia.

== History ==
In historical records the village was first mentioned in 1626.

== Geography ==
The municipality lies at an altitude of 389 metres (1,276 ft) and covers an area of 5.11 km^{2} (1.97 sq mi) (2025).

== Population ==
Population statistic (10 years)
Year	1995	2005	2015	2025
Count	243	246	295	292
Difference		+1.23%	+19.91%	−1.01%

Population statistic
Year	2024	2025
Count	292	292
Difference		+0%

It has a population of 292 people (31 December 2025).

=== Ethnicity ===
Census 2021 (1+ %)
Ethnicity	Number	Fraction
Slovak	281	99.29%
Total	283	

In year 2021 was 283 people by ethnicity 281 as Slovak, 1 as Not found out and 1 as Hungarian.

Note on population: The difference values of population numbers in the table "Population statistic" and in the sections "Ethnicity" & "Religion" is caused by the use of various statistical methods.

=== Religion ===
Census 2021 (1+ %)
Religion	Number	Fraction
Roman Catholic Church	161	56.89%
Greek Catholic Church	92	32.51%
None	22	7.77%
Evangelical Church	6	2.12%
Total	283	

In year 2021 was 283 people by religion 161 from Roman Catholic Church, 92 from Greek Catholic Church, 22 from None, 6 from Evangelical Church, 1 from Calvinist Church and 1 from Not found out.
