= Šarišská Trstená =

Village in Slovakia

- Municipality
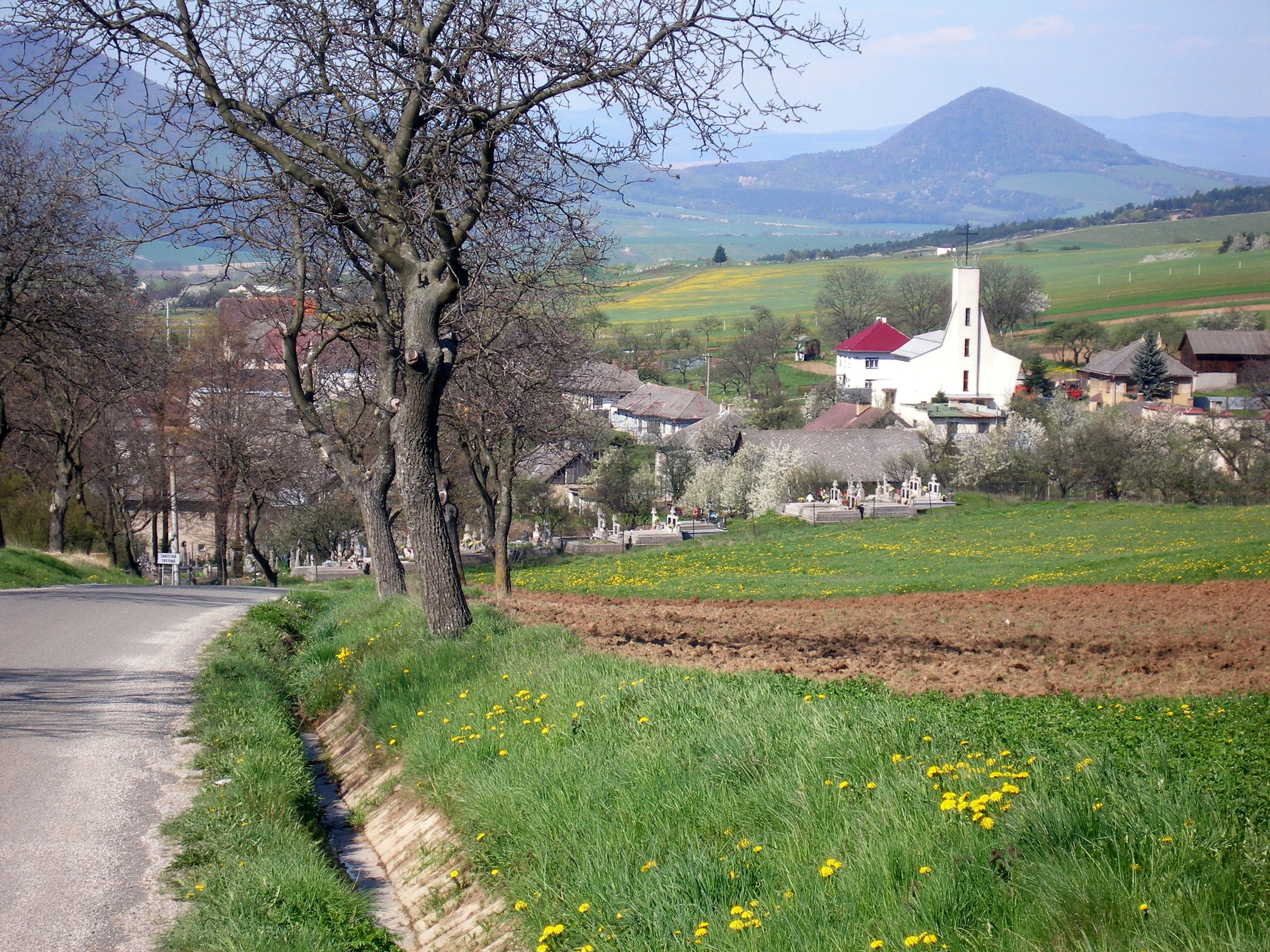

- Flag

- Location of Šarišská Trstená in the Prešov Region Location of Šarišská Trstená in Slovakia
- Coordinates: 49.09°N 21.38°E
- Country: Slovakia
- Region: Prešov Region
- District: Prešov District
- First mentioned: 1345

Government
  - Mayor: Jaroslav Fogaš

Area
  - Total: 1.84 km^{2} (0.71 sq mi)
- Elevation: 403 m (1,322 ft)

Population (2025)
  - Total: 385
- Time zone: UTC+1 (CET)
  - Summer (DST): UTC+2 (CEST)
- Postal code: 821 4
- Area code: +421 51
- Vehicle registration plate (until 2022): PO
- Website: www.obecsarisskatrstena.sk

Šarišská Trstená (Hungarian: Nádfő) is a village and municipality in Prešov District in the Prešov Region of eastern Slovakia.

== Geography ==
The village lies on the southwestern slopes of the Low Beskydy Mountains in the valley of the Šarišský brook, which is called Trstianka. The surface of the deforested area is slightly undulating to slightly indented. The municipality lies at an altitude of 403 metres (1,322 ft) and covers an area of 1.84 km^{2} (0.71 sq mi) (2025). The highest peak above the village is called Haľagoš and has 642 m. The village from the north is bordered by mostly mixed forests.

The village is located 15 km from the regional town of Presov. It is adjacent to the village of Chmeľovec and to the east to the village of Proč. You can also go south to the village of Čeľovce

== History ==
=== Establishment ===
The first written historical records of the village is from 1345, when it was part of the Komloš.

The landowner Nicholas, son of Dominik of Nadvej, also took part in the event of the demarcation of the property of the Šebeš castle estate in 1345 on behalf of the Hungarian King Louis I. The use of the name of this village in the name of Nicholas proves not only the ownership of the property but especially that Nicholas lived in the local manor. It is clear from this that the local settlement existed before 1345.

Mikuláš and his brothers Jakub and Vavrinec used the name of the village Chmeľovec in the predicate in 1351, and the document also states the then name Chmeľovec and Nadveja in an identifying connection. It follows from the mutual geographical location of both villages and their names that Nadvej originated on the original property of Komloš and was a younger settlement than Komloš. The Nadvej peasants undoubtedly came from the branched Komloš peasants, while Nadvej originated as a peasant settlement. At the instigation of the peasants, it was built by subjects from Komloš in the second half of the 13th or early 14th century.

=== 14th – 19th century ===
In documents from the 14th – 16th century. occurs regularly under the Hungarian name Nadfó composed of the words: above = reed and above = upper, upper. The name was created by describing the geographical location of the property or. settlement located in the upper part of the local stream valley. There can be no doubt that the Hungarian name Nadvej was created by local landowners. The Slovak name Nadvej was created from the Hungarian name by phonetic adaptation.

In 1600, the settlement consisted of 5 manors of local peasants. During the years 1715 – 1720, 2 – 5 serf households gradually farmed here, in 1828 there were 5 houses and 43 inhabitants. According to the 1869 census, there were 63 inhabitants and families of Krištof, Centek, Rákoš, Vaško, who still live in the village. In addition to them, the families Gbuv, Jusko, Lorinc, Matis, Žarnay also lived in the village. At the end of the 19th century, other families settled in the village:

- Kendra (1876) – Andrej Kendra (originally from Proč) moved to the village together with his wife Maria, born Ináš and child from Komloš.
- Talpaš (1879) – Ján Talpaš (originally from Hažgut) moved to the village with his wife Zuzana, born Ináš from Komloš.
- Kovaľ (1880) (1880) – Andrej Kovaľ came to the village together with his wife Anna, born Sabol from Hažgut.
- Frimer (1884) – Andrej Frimer moved to the village from Tulčík together with his wife Alžbeta, born Fedor.
- Balšay (1885) – Juraj Balšay came to the village of Komloš.
- Fogaš (1896) – Ján Fogaš came to the village with his wives Maria, born Biskupová of Tulčík.
- Plančar (1900) – Štefan Plančar came to the village with his family from Vagašu. His wife Barbora, born Ináš had a family and property here.

The inhabitants engaged in agriculture and farmed the land, which over time they bought from the original owners.

=== 20th century ===
At the beginning of the 20th century, many residents left for work and earnings in the USA. In 1911, at the eastern end of the village, where the local cemetery is located, the chapel of st. John of Nepomuk. After gaining independence from Austria-Hungary in October 1918, the declaration of the first Czechoslovak state, the village became part of the two-week bolshevik Slovak Republic of Councils in 1919, also known as the Slovak Soviet Republic. Its capital was Prešov from 16 June to 7 July 1919. After the suppression of the dictatorship of the proletariat, the village rejoined the Czechoslovak Republic. In the interwar period, the village then belonged to the district of Giraltovce. In the first great wave of addressing the names of municipalities, in 1928 the name was changed from Nadfej to Nadvej. At the 1930 census, all residents declared their Slovak nationality despite the fact 2 of the 14 houses were inhabited by Roma families.

At the 1940 census, the population increased to 117 inhabitants. Two years later, a census of the Jewish population was made in the process of Aryanization in Slovakia. There were no Jews in the village, nor were there any people who collaborated on the confiscation of Jewish property from the surrounding villages. During the Second World War, the inhabitants of the village from the years 1920–1924 – Juraj Frimer, Ján Kendra, Ján Kovaľ, who died 2 years after the war, also fought on the Eastern Front. During the bombing of the Chmeľov, evacuation took place and the locals took refuge in the families of this village. Specifically, it was the Bačišin family, which was attached to the house of Andrej Talpaš and his wife Mary, born Stankovič. The village itself was liberated from the fascist occupation together with the city of Prešov and the surrounding villages on 19 January 1945, by the Red Army. The liberation took place without a fight. The armed forces of Nazi Germany's Wehrmacht withdrew the day before the arrival of the Liberation Army. The first patrols of the Soviet army came to Kapušany(probably also Šarišská Trstená, then Nadveja) around 3 pm. Soviet troops belonged to the 320th Guards Regiment of the 4th Ukrainian Front, led by Lt. Col. AP Fokin and Major LJ Rotin. Members of the 1st Czechoslovak Army Corps also arrived with these units. The inhabitants of the village at that time provided the army with food and pigs.

After the end of the war and the change of regime in February 1948, there was a big change in the names of the villages by the commissioner of the interior, Daniel Okáli. Based on Decree No. A-311/16-II / 3-1948 of 11 June 1948, the official names of 710 towns, villages, and settlements in Slovakia were addressed. The village of Nadvej was given the current name Šarišská Trstená.

With the rise of the communists in 1960, the United Agricultural Cooperative (JRD) was founded. The inhabitants of the village had contingents that had to pay the cooperative from the crop on their own land, which their families and ancestors, as self-employed farmers, worked for decades. In the spring of 1964, the cooperative merged with the cooperative in Pušovce and Čelovce. The merged cooperative bore the new name ROZVOJ (in english "development"). In the spring of 1968, JRD Proč joined the ROZVOJ. In 1985, the joint cooperative had 395 permanent staff, of which 220 were women. The President of JRD was Ing. Jozef Jakša.

The inhabitants of the village were Christian. And despite the persecution of the churches by the communists, the dream of one's own church was fulfilled in the 1960s, as until then the inhabitants had to travel several kilometers to neighboring villages for services and especially the parish church in Pušovce.

View of the Church of Christ the King, which is a symbol of the village. The change came mainly thanks to the Dubček era and the first Slovak diplomat in the service of the Holy See, a native of Msgr. ICDr. Štefan Fogaš and local residents who took part in the self-help construction of the Roman Catholic Church in Christ the King. Construction began in the late 1960s and the church was built in 1970.

The diplomat himself had a complicated entry into his native country, but in 1970, 1971, and 1972 he used a diplomatic passport and came to visit his native country. However, he did not live to see the consecration of the new church dedicated to Christ the King. On 28 March 1974, news came from Paris that at the age of 49, Monsignor Štefan Fogaš had died suddenly. After the intervention of the Vatican at the embassy of the Czechoslovak Socialist Republic in Italy, consent was granted to transport the remains to his homeland, but for unclear reasons, it was later revoked and the day before the funeral he was finally transferred to Rome, where he was buried. Half a year after his death, the church was finally consecrated. [35] After 33 or three years, on 12 December 2007 at 15:00 in the presence of the then Archbishop of Košice, Mons. Alojz Tkáč 's remains were transported and stored at the entrance to the local cemetery.

In 1964, a road was built through the village in the full section from Chmeľov to Kapušany. In 1978, the work on the construction of municipal radios in Šarišská Trstená and neighboring Proč was completed. They were connected to the radio equipment in the village of Pušovce. The total expenditure was 210 000 CSK and its first public broadcast took place before New Year's Eve. Of interest from the cornices, a strong flight of bees was recorded on New Year's Eve 1988, which is unusual for the given period, and a similar phenomenon has not been recorded before.

=== After communism till present time ===
After the fall of the communist system, the JRD went bankrupt and later disappeared. Land that passed under the JRD gradually began to be returned to them through ROEP (Register of Renewed Land Register). Such proceedings took place in the municipality in the years 1996 – 2007. During this registration process, there were many inaccuracies and often inconsistencies with the original state. Many owners were long after death and there was no additional inheritance proceedings, respectively. often all passed to one legal successor, although the heirs did not reject the inheritance. In 1990, the charity house for nuns was restored. However, the church later sold it. The church was important to the locals, and about 15 women worked as nuns at the time. In 1994began to build a new municipal office and culture house. It has been open to local cultural events and festivities since 2009 and was completed five years later, of course, thanks to European Union structural funds, which began to be used mainly after 2010.

== Changes in the name ==
The name of the village changed over time:
1345 – 1351 was known as Nadfu,
1351 – 1773 was known as Nadfeu or Kolmos,
1773 – 1786 was known as Nadfeő or Natwej,
1786 – 1808 was known as Nadfő or Nadfej,
1808 – 1920 was known as Nádfő or Nadfej,
1920 – 1927 was known as Nádvej or Nádfej,
1927 – 1948 was known as Nadvej,
1948 – to this day uses the official name Šarišská Trstená.

== Population ==
The graph below shows the development of the population in the village of Šarišská Trstená. The X-axis indicates the timeline from 1826 to the present. The Ypsilon axis shows the total population of the village. Until the beginning of the 20th century, the village was a small settlement with a population not exceeding one hundred (1828–43 inhabitants, 1869 – 63 inhabitants, 1880 – 39 inhabitants, 1900–72 inhabitants, 1910–76 inhabitants, 1921 – 75 inhabitants, 1930 – 94 inhabitants). After the establishment of an independent Czechoslovakia, the number of people increased by 56% and in 1940 it reached 117 inhabitants.

Over the next twentieth year, the number increased again by 53% to 179 inhabitants and in the early '70s exceeded 200 inhabitants. By the end of the communist regime, there was no jump in population (1971 – 208 inhabitants, 1991 – 223 inhabitants). After the establishment of an independent Slovakia, thanks to the development of the country over the course of thirty years by approximately 61% from 223 to the current 362 inhabitants (2001 – 264 inhabitants, 2011 – 306 inhabitants). Nowadays it has a population of 359 people (2020-12-31).

Population statistic (10 years)
| Year | 1995 | 2005 | 2015 | 2025 |
|---|---|---|---|---|
| Count | 223 | 268 | 347 | 385 |
| Difference | | +20.17% | +29.47% | +10.95% |

Population statistic
| Year | 2024 | 2025 |
|---|---|---|
| Count | 377 | 385 |
| Difference | | +2.12% |

It has a population of 385 people (31 December 2025).

=== Ethnicity ===
Census 2021 (1+ %)
| Ethnicity | Number | Fraction |
|---|---|---|
| Slovak | 347 | 97.47% |
| Romani | 113 | 31.74% |
| Not found out | 7 | 1.96% |
| Total | 356 | |

In year 2021 was 356 people by ethnicity 347 as Slovak, 113 as Romani, 7 as Not found out, 1 as Ukrainian, 1 as Rusyn, 1 as Russian and 1 as Other.

Note on population: The difference values of population numbers in the table "Population statistic" and in the sections "Ethnicity" & "Religion" is caused by the use of various statistical methods.

=== Religion ===
Census 2021 (1+ %)
| Religion | Number | Fraction |
|---|---|---|
| Roman Catholic Church | 323 | 90.73% |
| Evangelical Church | 7 | 1.97% |
| Other and not ascertained christian church | 5 | 1.4% |
| Not found out | 5 | 1.4% |
| Christian Congregations in Slovakia | 5 | 1.4% |
| Greek Catholic Church | 5 | 1.4% |
| Total | 356 | |

In year 2021 was 356 people by religion 323 from Roman Catholic Church, 7 from Evangelical Church, 5 from Other and not ascertained christian church, 5 from Not found out, 5 from Christian Congregations in Slovakia, 5 from Greek Catholic Church, 3 from None, 2 from Old Catholic Church and 1 from Eastern Orthodox Church.

== Politics ==
=== Local selfgovernment ===
The municipal council of the municipality of Šarišská Trstená is a body of the municipality and a representative body of the inhabitants of the municipality. It has 5 deputies who are elected directly in municipal elections for a period of four years.

The mayor of the municipality is the executive and statutory body of the municipality. He is elected directly for a 4-year term. He chairs council meetings and signs their resolutions. He has one deputy mayor of the village.

=== Mayors ===
- 1990—1994: František Centek (Independent)
- 1994—1998: František Centek (KDH)
- 1998—2002: František Centek (KDH)
- 2002—2006: Jaroslav Fogaš (SMER)
- 2006—2010: Jaroslav Fogaš (SMER-SD)
- 2010—2014: Jaroslav Fogaš (SMER-SD)
- 2014—2018: Jaroslav Fogaš (SMER-SD)
- 2018—2022: Jaroslav Fogaš (SMER-SD)
- 2022—2026: ? ? (?)

=== Municipal elections ===
Results of municipal elections in the village of Šarišská Trstená (1990–present)
| Municipal elections | Turnout | | Mayor's election results | | Results of the election of deputies | |
| Municipal elections | % | Number of issued envelopes | Elected mayor | Unelected candidates | Elected deputies | Unelected candidates |
|---|---|---|---|---|---|---|
| 1990 | ?? | ? | František Centek (independent) | ? | ? | ? |
| 1994 | 69.34% | 95 | František Centek (KDH); 69 votes (100%) | ? | František Fogaš (KDH); Peter Fogaš (KDH); Verona Fogašová (KDH); Cyril Kendra (KDH); Juraj Kendra (KDH); Štefan Kendra (KDH); Stanislav Solej (KDH); Milan Telesnický (KDH); Jozef Vaško (KDH) | ? |
| 1998 | 66.67% | 100 | František Centek (KDH) | ? | KDH – 9 deputies | ? |
| 2002 | 78.62% | 125 | Jaroslav Fogaš (SMER); 124 votes (100%) | without a rival | KDH – 3 deputies SMER – 1 deputy DS – 1 deputy | ? |
| 2006 | 38.79% | 64 | Jaroslav Fogaš (SMER-SD); 60 votes (100%) | without a rival | SMER-SD – 5 deputies | ? |
| 2010 | 74.87% | 140 | Jaroslav Fogaš (SMER-SD); 99 votes (70.71%) | 2. Stanislav Solej (KDH); 41 votes (29.29%) | 1. Cyril Kendra (SMER-SD) – votes (%); 2. Peter Fogaš (SMER-SD) – votes (%); 3. Peter Kendra (KDH) – votes (%); 4. Ján Krištof (SMER-SD) – votes (%); 5. František Juskanin (SMER-SD) – votes (%) | ? |
| 2014 | 69.86% | 153 | Jaroslav Fogaš (SMER-SD); 98 votes (64.47%) | 2. Mária Talpašová (KDH); 39 votes (25.66%); 3. Anna Solejová (PaS); 15 votes (9.87%) | 1. Peter Telesnický (SaS) – 86 votes (58.66%); 2. Peter Kendra (KDH) – 83 votes (55.33%); 3. Ján Krištof (SMER-SD) – 76 votes (50.66%); 4. Peter Fogaš (SMER-SD) – 69 votes (46.00%); 5. Petra Kučerová (SMER-SD) – 69 votes (46.00%) | ? |
| 2018 | 46.06% | 117 | Jaroslav Fogaš (SMER-SD); 110 votes (100%) | without a rival | 1. Martin Talpaš (independent) – 95 votes (81.19%); 2. Ján Krištof (SMER-SD) – 88 votes (75.21%); 3. Jozef Kendra (SMER-SD) – 83 votes (70.94%); 4. Peter Fogaš (SMER-SD) – 80 votes (68.37%); 5. Martin Kučera (SMER-SD) – 80 votes (68.37%) | 6. Marián Horvát (independent) – 23 votes (19.66%); 7. Ondrej Horvát (independent) – 22 votes (18.80%) |

== Personalities ==
=== Important personalities ===
- Mons. Štefan Fogaš -the first Slovak diplomat serving in the Holy See.
- Mons. Jozef Krištof – Slovak priest working in the services of Holy See.

== Médiá (foto, audio, dokumenty) ==
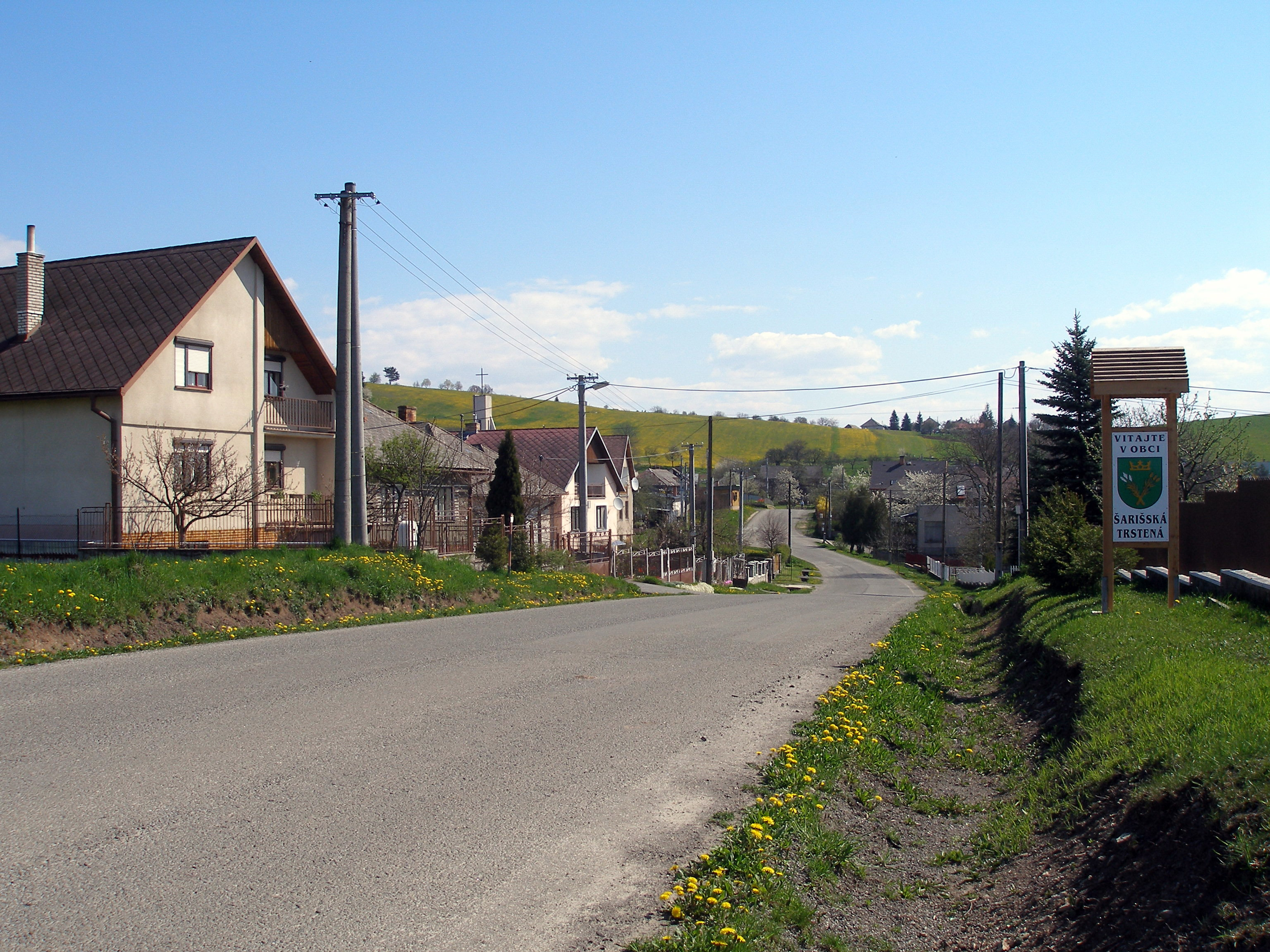
View of the western entrance to the village

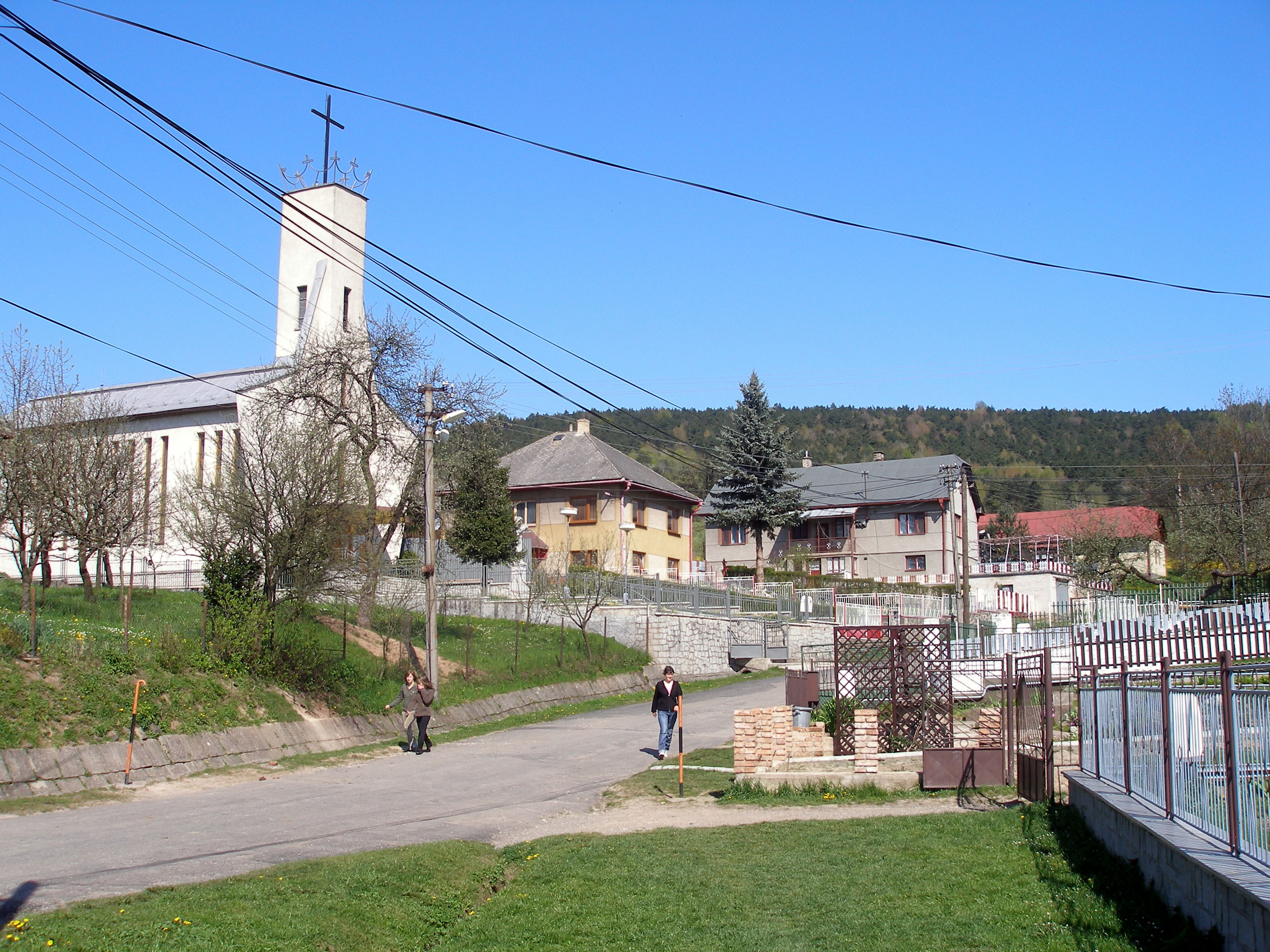
The center of the village also called "valal"
