= Čelovce =

Čelovce may refer to:

- Čelovce, Prešov District, Slovakia
- Čelovce, Veľký Krtíš District, Slovakia
