= Celovce =

Celovce may refer to several places in Slovakia

- Čelovce, Veľký Krtíš District
- Čeľovce - a village in Trebisov District in eastern Kosice Region
