= Proc =

Proc may refer to:

- Proč, a village in eastern Slovakia
- Proč?, a 1987 Czech film
- procfs or proc filesystem, a special file system (typically mounted to /proc) in Unix-like operating systems for accessing process information
- Protein C (PROC)
- Proc, a term in video game terminology
- Procedures or process, in the programming language ALGOL 68
- the official acronym for the Canadian House of Commons Standing Committee on Procedure and House Affairs
- Pro*C, a programming language
- the People's Republic of China, abbreviated as PROC
