= Čeľovce =

Village and municipality in Slovakia

Čeľovce Cselej
- Municipality
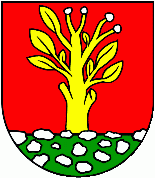
- Flag Coat of arms

- Location of Čeľovce in the Košice Region Location of Čeľovce in Slovakia
- Coordinates: 48.60°N 21.63°E
- Country: Slovakia
- Region: Košice Region
- District: Trebišov District
- First mentioned: 1309

Government
  - Mayor: Jana Sabóvá (Smer-SD, Hlas, SME Rodina)

Area
  - Total: 13.26 km^{2} (5.12 sq mi)
- Elevation: 139 m (456 ft)

Population (2025)
  - Total: 552
- Time zone: UTC+1 (CET)
  - Summer (DST): UTC+2 (CEST)
- Postal code: 761 7
- Area code: +421 56
- Vehicle registration plate (until 2022): TV
- Website: celovce.sk

Čeľovce (Slovak pronunciation: [ˈtʂeʎɔwtse]; Hungarian: Cselej) is a village and municipality in the Trebišov District in the Košice Region of eastern Slovakia. Former Royal Hungarian town in the Kingdom of Hungary.

== History ==
In historical records the village was first mentioned in 1220.

== Geography ==
The municipality lies at an altitude of 139 metres (456 ft) and covers an area of 13.26 km^{2} (5.12 sq mi) (2025).

== Population ==
Population statistic (10 years)
Year	1995	2005	2015	2025
Count	494	522	556	552
Difference		+5.66%	+6.51%	−0.71%

Population statistic
Year	2024	2025
Count	551	552
Difference		+0.18%

It has a population of 552 people (31 December 2025).

=== Ethnicity ===
Census 2021 (1+ %)
Ethnicity	Number	Fraction
Slovak	496	90.18%
Not found out	45	8.18%
Romani	35	6.36%
Total	550	

In year 2021 was 550 people by ethnicity 496 as Slovak, 45 as Not found out, 35 as Romani, 4 as Hungarian, 3 as Moravian and 1 as German.

Note on population: The difference values of population numbers in the table "Population statistic" and in the sections "Ethnicity" & "Religion" is caused by the use of various statistical methods.

=== Religion ===
Census 2021 (1+ %)
Religion	Number	Fraction
Roman Catholic Church	263	47.82%
Greek Catholic Church	160	29.09%
Not found out	62	11.27%
None	29	5.27%
Calvinist Church	17	3.09%
Evangelical Church	13	2.36%
Total	550	

In year 2021 was 550 people by religion 263 from Roman Catholic Church, 160 from Greek Catholic Church, 62 from Not found out, 29 from None, 17 from Calvinist Church, 13 from Evangelical Church, 3 from Seventh-day Adventist Church, 2 from Ad hoc movements and 1 from Eastern Orthodox Church.

== Facilities ==
The village has a public library, a cinema and a football pitch.

== Genealogical resources ==
The records for genealogical research are available at the state archive "Statny Archiv in Kosice, Slovakia"

- Roman Catholic church records (births/marriages/deaths): 1723–1896 (parish B)
- Greek Catholic church records (births/marriages/deaths): 1812–1909 (parish A)
- Reformated church records (births/marriages/deaths): 1756–1952 (parish B)

== See also ==
- List of municipalities and towns in Slovakia
