= Šarišská Poruba =

Village and municipality in Slovakia

- Municipality
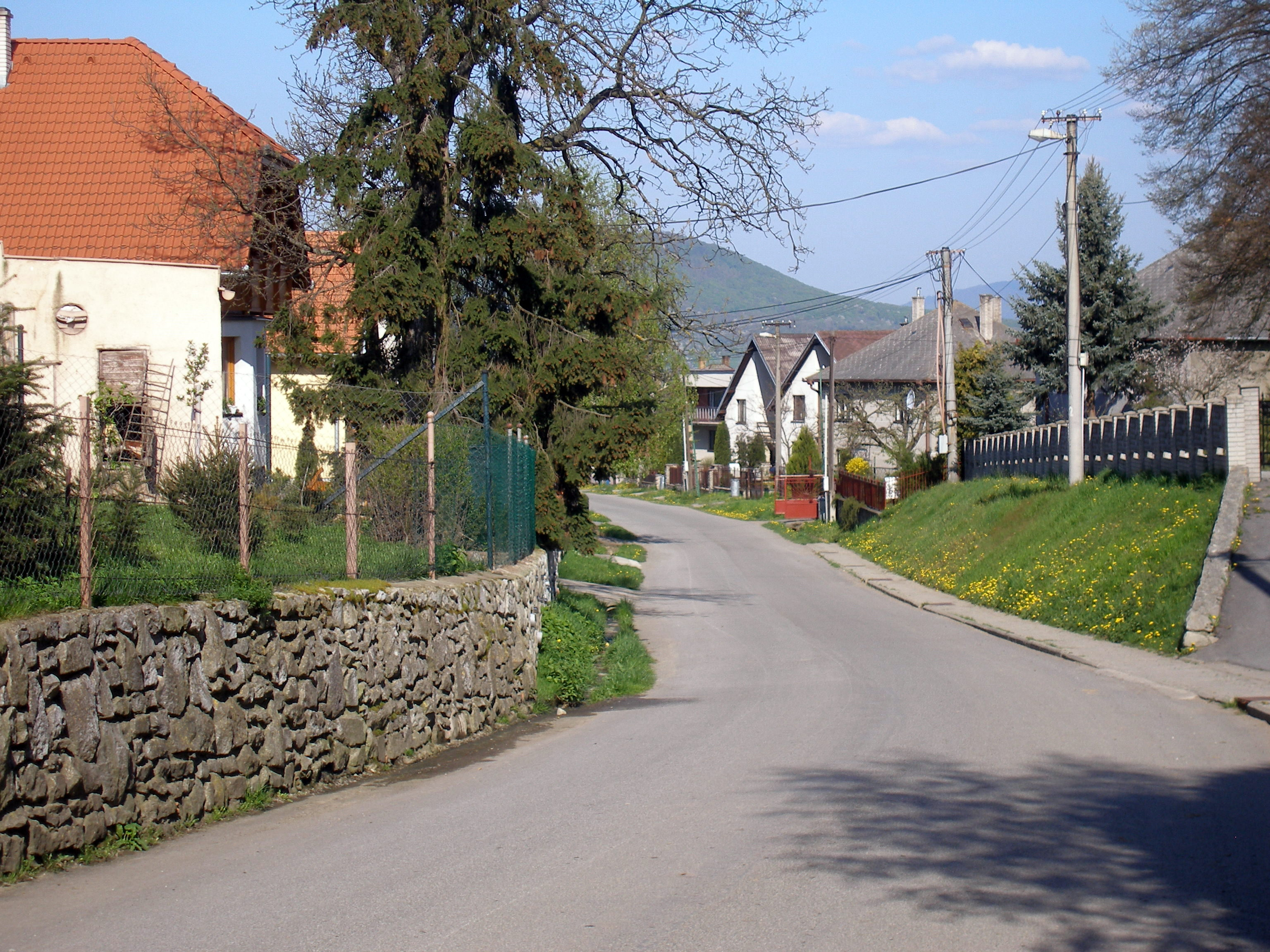

- Flag

- Location of Šarišská Poruba in the Prešov Region Location of Šarišská Poruba in Slovakia
- Coordinates: 49.05°N 21.38°E
- Country: Slovakia
- Region: Prešov Region
- District: Prešov District
- First mentioned: 1410

Area
  - Total: 5.98 km^{2} (2.31 sq mi)
- Elevation: 344 m (1,129 ft)

Population (2025)
  - Total: 732
- Time zone: UTC+1 (CET)
  - Summer (DST): UTC+2 (CEST)
- Postal code: 821 2
- Area code: +421 51
- Vehicle registration plate (until 2022): PO
- Website: www.sarisskaporuba.sk

Šarišská Poruba (Hungarian: Kapivágása) is a village and municipality in Prešov District in the Prešov Region of eastern Slovakia.

== History ==
In historical records the village was first mentioned in 1410.

== Geography ==
The municipality lies at an altitude of 344 metres (1,129 ft) and covers an area of 5.98 km^{2} (2.31 sq mi) (2025).

== Population ==
Population statistic (10 years)
Year	1995	2005	2015	2025
Count	378	439	597	732
Difference		+16.13%	+35.99%	+22.61%

Population statistic
Year	2024	2025
Count	718	732
Difference		+1.94%

It has a population of 732 people (31 December 2025).

=== Ethnicity ===
Census 2021 (1+ %)
Ethnicity	Number	Fraction
Slovak	616	96.09%
Romani	312	48.67%
Not found out	20	3.12%
Total	641	

In year 2021 was 641 people by ethnicity 616 as Slovak, 312 as Romani, 20 as Not found out, 4 as Rusyn, 2 as Hungarian, 1 as Jewish, 1 as Polish and 1 as Other.

Note on population: The difference values of population numbers in the table "Population statistic" and in the sections "Ethnicity" & "Religion" is caused by the use of various statistical methods.

=== Religion ===
Census 2021 (1+ %)
Religion	Number	Fraction
Roman Catholic Church	404	63.03%
Evangelical Church	204	31.83%
Not found out	16	2.5%
None	9	1.4%
Total	641	

In year 2021 was 641 people by religion 404 from Roman Catholic Church, 204 from Evangelical Church, 16 from Not found out, 9 from None, 6 from Greek Catholic Church, 1 from Eastern Orthodox Church and 1 from Church of the Brethren.
