= Chmeľov =

Village and municipality in Slovakia

- Municipality
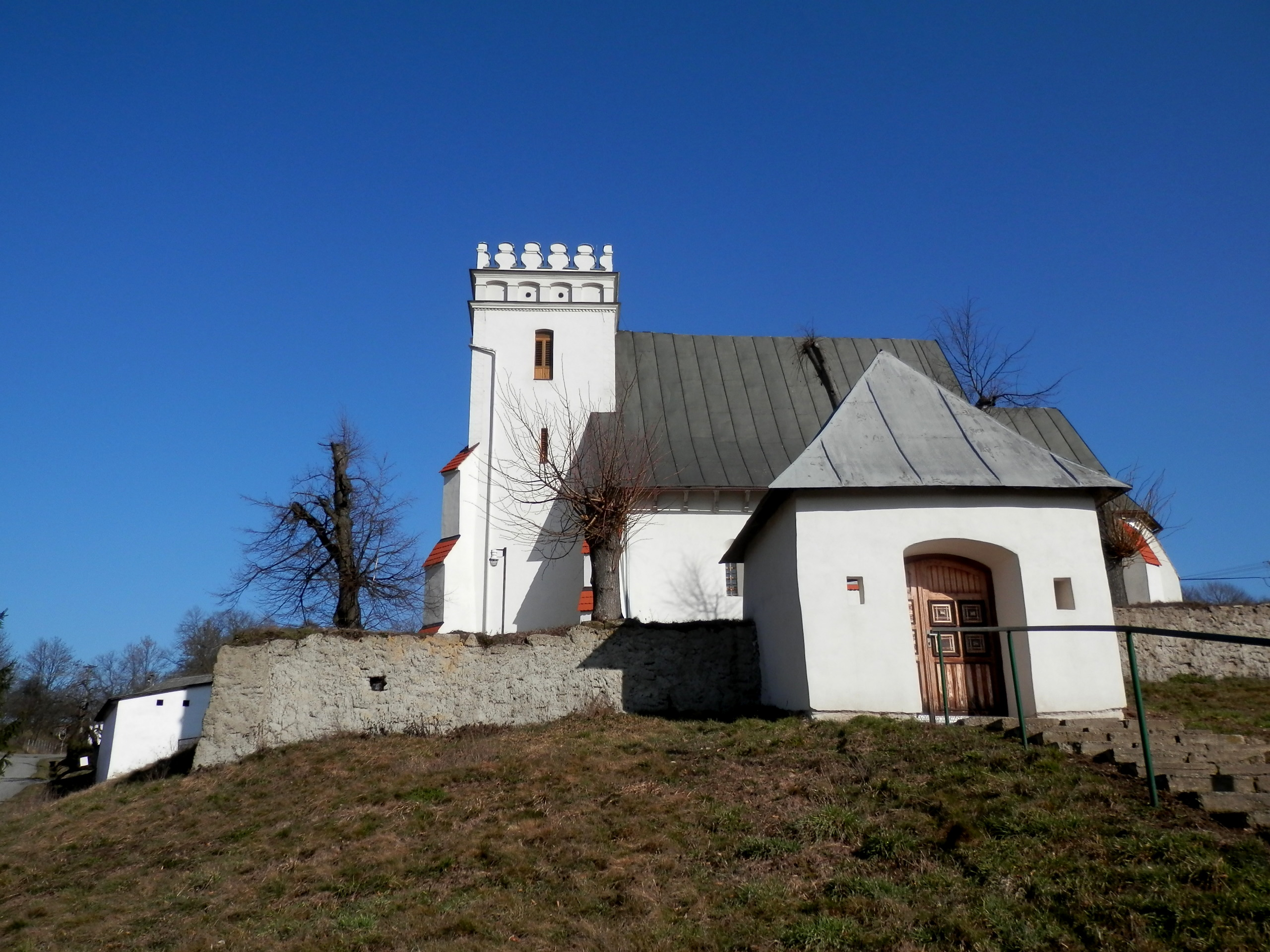

- Flag

- Location of Chmeľov in the Prešov Region Location of Chmeľov in Slovakia
- Coordinates: 49.07°N 21.45°E
- Country: Slovakia
- Region: Prešov Region
- District: Prešov District
- First mentioned: 1212

Area
  - Total: 12.63 km^{2} (4.88 sq mi)
- Elevation: 358 m (1,175 ft)

Population (2025)
  - Total: 1,075
- Time zone: UTC+1 (CET)
  - Summer (DST): UTC+2 (CEST)
- Postal code: 821 5
- Area code: +421 51
- Vehicle registration plate (until 2022): PO
- Website: obecchmelov.sk

Chmeľov (Hungarian: Komlóskeresztes) is a village and municipality in Prešov District in the Prešov Region of eastern Slovakia.

== History ==
In historical records the village was first mentioned in 1212.

== Geography ==
The municipality lies at an altitude of 358 metres (1,175 ft) and covers an area of 12.63 km^{2} (4.88 sq mi) (2025).

== Population ==
Population statistic (10 years)
Year	1995	2005	2015	2025
Count	861	910	994	1075
Difference		+5.69%	+9.23%	+8.14%

Population statistic
Year	2024	2025
Count	1076	1075
Difference		−0.09%

It has a population of 1075 people (31 December 2025).

=== Ethnicity ===
Census 2021 (1+ %)
Ethnicity	Number	Fraction
Slovak	1008	94.55%
Romani	162	15.19%
Not found out	20	1.87%
Total	1066	

In year 2021 was 1066 people by ethnicity 1008 as Slovak, 162 as Romani, 20 as Not found out, 7 as Rusyn, 5 as Czech, 2 as Hungarian, 1 as Ukrainian and 1 as English.

Note on population: The difference values of population numbers in the table "Population statistic" and in the sections "Ethnicity" & "Religion" is caused by the use of various statistical methods.

=== Religion ===
Census 2021 (1+ %)
Religion	Number	Fraction
Roman Catholic Church	582	54.6%
Evangelical Church	320	30.02%
Greek Catholic Church	78	7.32%
None	54	5.07%
Not found out	20	1.88%
Total	1066	

In year 2021 was 1066 people by religion 582 from Roman Catholic Church, 320 from Evangelical Church, 78 from Greek Catholic Church, 54 from None, 20 from Not found out, 5 from Paganism and natural spirituality, 3 from Eastern Orthodox Church, 2 from Calvinist Church and 2 from Other.

== Genealogical resources ==
The records for genealogical research are available at the state archive "Statny Archiv in Presov, Slovakia"

- Roman Catholic church records (births/marriages/deaths): 1788–1895 (parish B)
- Greek Catholic church records (births/marriages/deaths): 1812–1896 (parish B)
- Lutheran church records (births/marriages/deaths): 1766–1895 (parish A)

== See also ==
- List of municipalities and towns in Slovakia
