= Podhorany, Prešov District =

Village and municipality in Slovakia

Podhorany
- Municipality
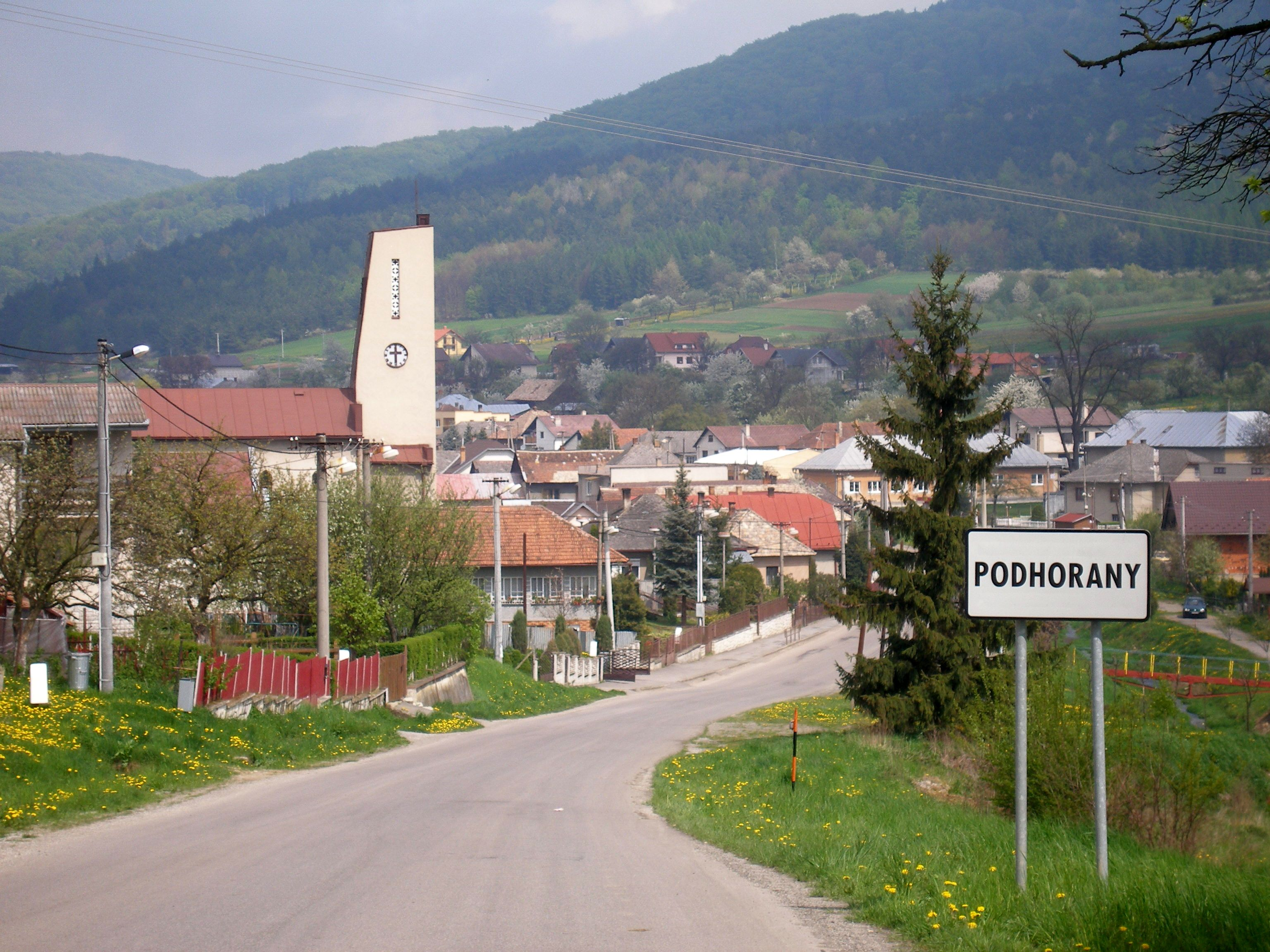

- Flag

- Location of Podhorany in the Prešov Region Location of Podhorany in Slovakia
- Coordinates: 49.08°N 21.36°E
- Country: Slovakia
- Region: Prešov Region
- District: Prešov District
- First mentioned: 1283

Area
  - Total: 7.11 km^{2} (2.75 sq mi)
- Elevation: 333 m (1,093 ft)

Population (2025)
  - Total: 888
- Time zone: UTC+1 (CET)
  - Summer (DST): UTC+2 (CEST)
- Postal code: 821 4
- Area code: +421 51
- Vehicle registration plate (until 2022): PO
- Website: www.podhorany.eu

Podhorany (Hungarian: Ásgút) is a small village and municipality in Prešov District in the Prešov Region of north Slovakia.

== History ==
In historical records the village was first mentioned in 1240.

== Geography ==
The municipality lies at an altitude of 333 metres (1,093 ft) and covers an area of 7.11 km^{2} (2.75 sq mi) (2025).

== Population ==
Population statistic (10 years)
Year	1995	2005	2015	2025
Count	612	691	791	888
Difference		+12.90%	+14.47%	+12.26%

Population statistic
Year	2024	2025
Count	890	888
Difference		−0.22%

It has a population of 888 people (31 December 2025).

=== Ethnicity ===
Census 2021 (1+ %)
Ethnicity	Number	Fraction
Slovak	846	98.71%
Rusyn	11	1.28%
Total	857	

In year 2021 was 857 people by ethnicity 846 as Slovak, 11 as Rusyn, 7 as Not found out, 4 as Other, 2 as Hungarian, 1 as Czech, 1 as Irish and 1 as Russian.

Note on population: The difference values of population numbers in the table "Population statistic" and in the sections "Ethnicity" & "Religion" is caused by the use of various statistical methods.

=== Religion ===
Census 2021 (1+ %)
Religion	Number	Fraction
Roman Catholic Church	728	84.95%
None	47	5.48%
Greek Catholic Church	35	4.08%
Evangelical Church	28	3.27%
Not found out	13	1.52%
Total	857	

In year 2021 was 857 people by religion 728 from Roman Catholic Church, 47 from None, 35 from Greek Catholic Church, 28 from Evangelical Church, 13 from Not found out, 2 from Eastern Orthodox Church, 2 from Ad hoc movements, 1 from Old Catholic Church and 1 from Christian Congregations in Slovakia.
