= Tulčík =

Village and municipality in Slovakia

- Municipality
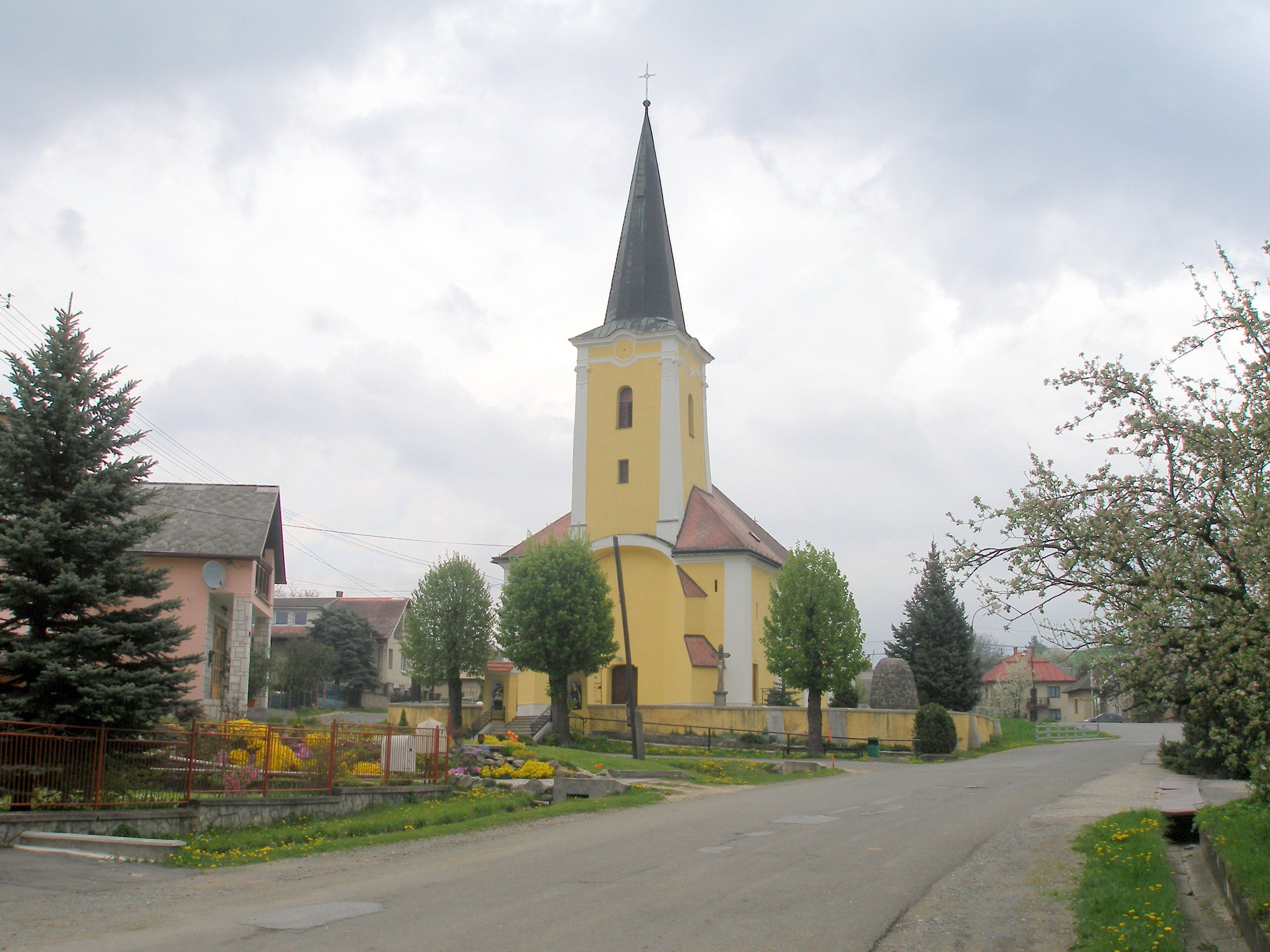
- Church of Saints Simon and Jude

- Flag

- Location of Tulčík in the Prešov Region Location of Tulčík in Slovakia
- Coordinates: 49.08°N 21.30°E
- Country: Slovakia
- Region: Prešov Region
- District: Prešov District
- First mentioned: 1248

Area
  - Total: 12.81 km^{2} (4.95 sq mi)
- Elevation: 276 m (906 ft)

Population (2025)
  - Total: 1,321
- Time zone: UTC+1 (CET)
  - Summer (DST): UTC+2 (CEST)
- Postal code: 821 3
- Area code: +421 51
- Vehicle registration plate (until 2022): PO
- Website: www.tulcik.sk

Tulčík (Hungarian: Töltszék) is a village and municipality in Prešov District in the Prešov Region of eastern Slovakia.

== History ==
In historical records the village was first mentioned in 1248.

== Geography ==
The municipality lies at an altitude of 276 metres (906 ft) and covers an area of 12.81 km^{2} (4.95 sq mi) (2025).

== Population ==
Population statistic (10 years)
Year	1995	2005	2015	2025
Count	1266	1307	1325	1321
Difference		+3.23%	+1.37%	−0.30%

Population statistic
Year	2024	2025
Count	1334	1321
Difference		−0.97%

It has a population of 1321 people (31 December 2025).

=== Ethnicity ===
Census 2021 (1+ %)
Ethnicity	Number	Fraction
Slovak	1307	98.19%
Not found out	20	1.5%
Total	1331	

In year 2021 was 1331 people by ethnicity 1307 as Slovak, 20 as Not found out, 7 as Rusyn, 2 as Czech, 2 as Ukrainian, 2 as Other, 1 as Romani and 1 as Polish.

Note on population: The difference values of population numbers in the table "Population statistic" and in the sections "Ethnicity" & "Religion" is caused by the use of various statistical methods.

=== Religion ===
Census 2021 (1+ %)
Religion	Number	Fraction
Roman Catholic Church	1172	88.05%
None	80	6.01%
Greek Catholic Church	43	3.23%
Not found out	20	1.5%
Total	1331	

In year 2021 was 1331 people by religion 1172 from Roman Catholic Church, 80 from None, 43 from Greek Catholic Church, 20 from Not found out, 7 from Eastern Orthodox Church, 7 from Evangelical Church, 1 from Calvinist Church and 1 from Other.
