= Chmeľovec =

Village and municipality in Slovakia

- Municipality
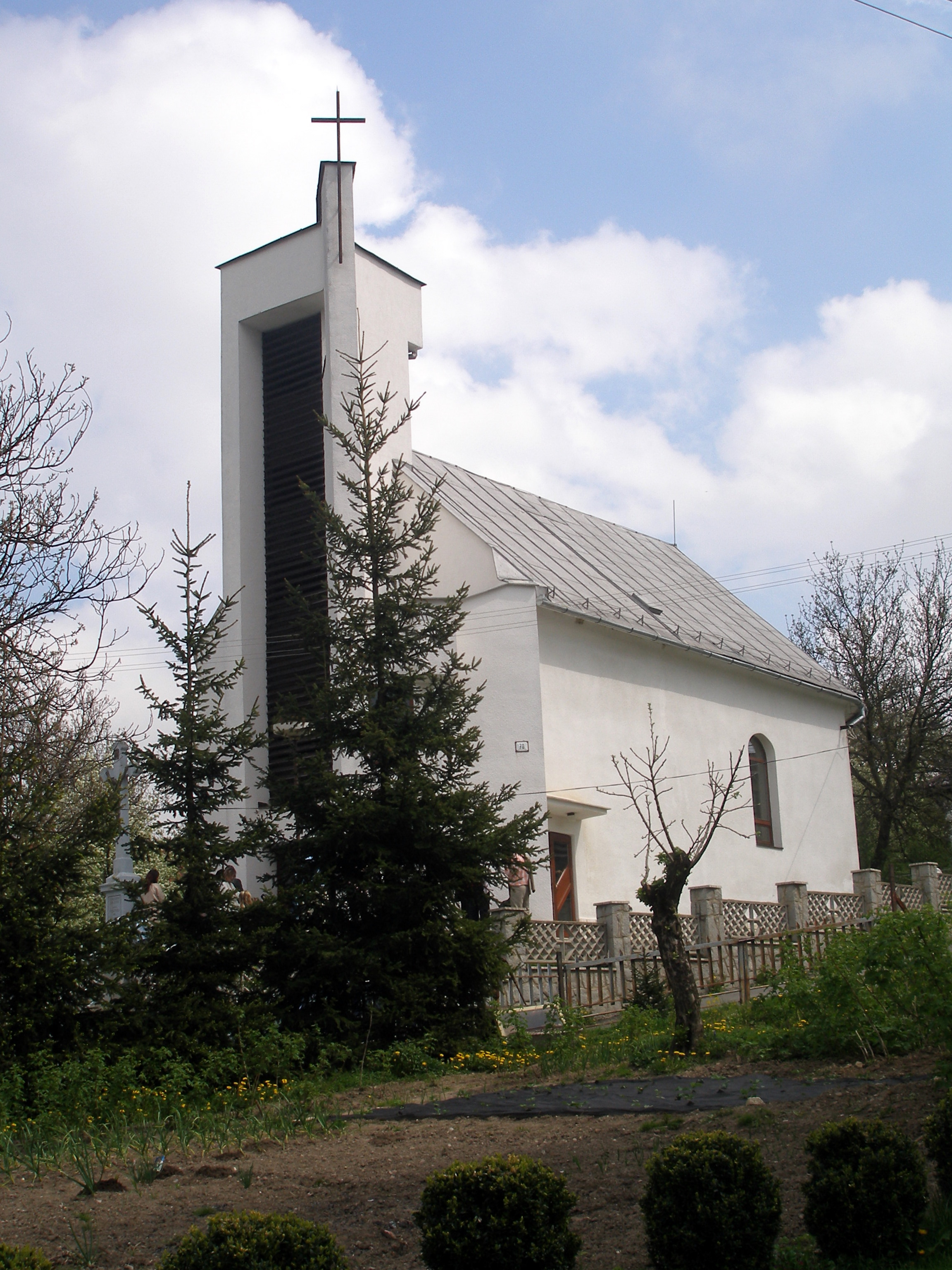

- Flag

- Location of Chmeľovec in the Prešov Region Location of Chmeľovec in Slovakia
- Coordinates: 49.08°N 21.37°E
- Country: Slovakia
- Region: Prešov Region
- District: Prešov District
- First mentioned: 1251

Area
  - Total: 7.28 km^{2} (2.81 sq mi)
- Elevation: 368 m (1,207 ft)

Population (2025)
  - Total: 485
- Time zone: UTC+1 (CET)
  - Summer (DST): UTC+2 (CEST)
- Postal code: 821 2
- Area code: +421 51
- Vehicle registration plate (until 2022): PO
- Website: www.chmelovec.sk

Chmeľovec (Hungarian: Tapolykomlós) is a village and municipality in Prešov District in the Prešov Region of eastern Slovakia.

== History ==
In historical records, the village was first mentioned in 1251.

== Geography ==
The municipality lies at an altitude of 368 metres (1,207 ft) and covers an area of 7.28 km^{2} (2.81 sq mi) (2025).

== Population ==
Population statistic (10 years)
Year	1995	2005	2015	2025
Count	399	437	437	485
Difference		+9.52%	+0%	+10.98%

Population statistic
Year	2024	2025
Count	466	485
Difference		+4.07%

It has a population of 485 people (31 December 2025).

=== Ethnicity ===
Census 2021 (1+ %)
Ethnicity	Number	Fraction
Slovak	447	99.55%
Rusyn	7	1.55%
Not found out	6	1.33%
Total	449	

In year 2021 was 449 people by ethnicity 447 as Slovak, 7 as Rusyn and 6 as Not found out.

Note on population: The difference values of population numbers in the table "Population statistic" and in the sections "Ethnicity" & "Religion" is caused by the use of various statistical methods.

=== Religion ===
Census 2021 (1+ %)
Religion	Number	Fraction
Roman Catholic Church	338	75.28%
Evangelical Church	66	14.7%
Greek Catholic Church	21	4.68%
None	20	4.45%
Total	449	

In year 2021 was 449 people by religion 338 from Roman Catholic Church, 66 from Evangelical Church, 21 from Greek Catholic Church, 20 from None, 3 from Not found out and 1 from Paganism and natural spirituality.

== Genealogical resources ==
The records for genealogical research are available at the state archive "Statny Archiv in Presov, Slovakia"

- Roman Catholic church records (births/marriages/deaths): 1788–1895 (parish B)
- Lutheran church records (births/marriages/deaths): 1724–1895 (parish A)

== See also ==
- List of municipalities and towns in Slovakia
