= Čelovce, Prešov District =

Village and municipality in Prešov District in Slovakia

Čelovce
- Municipality
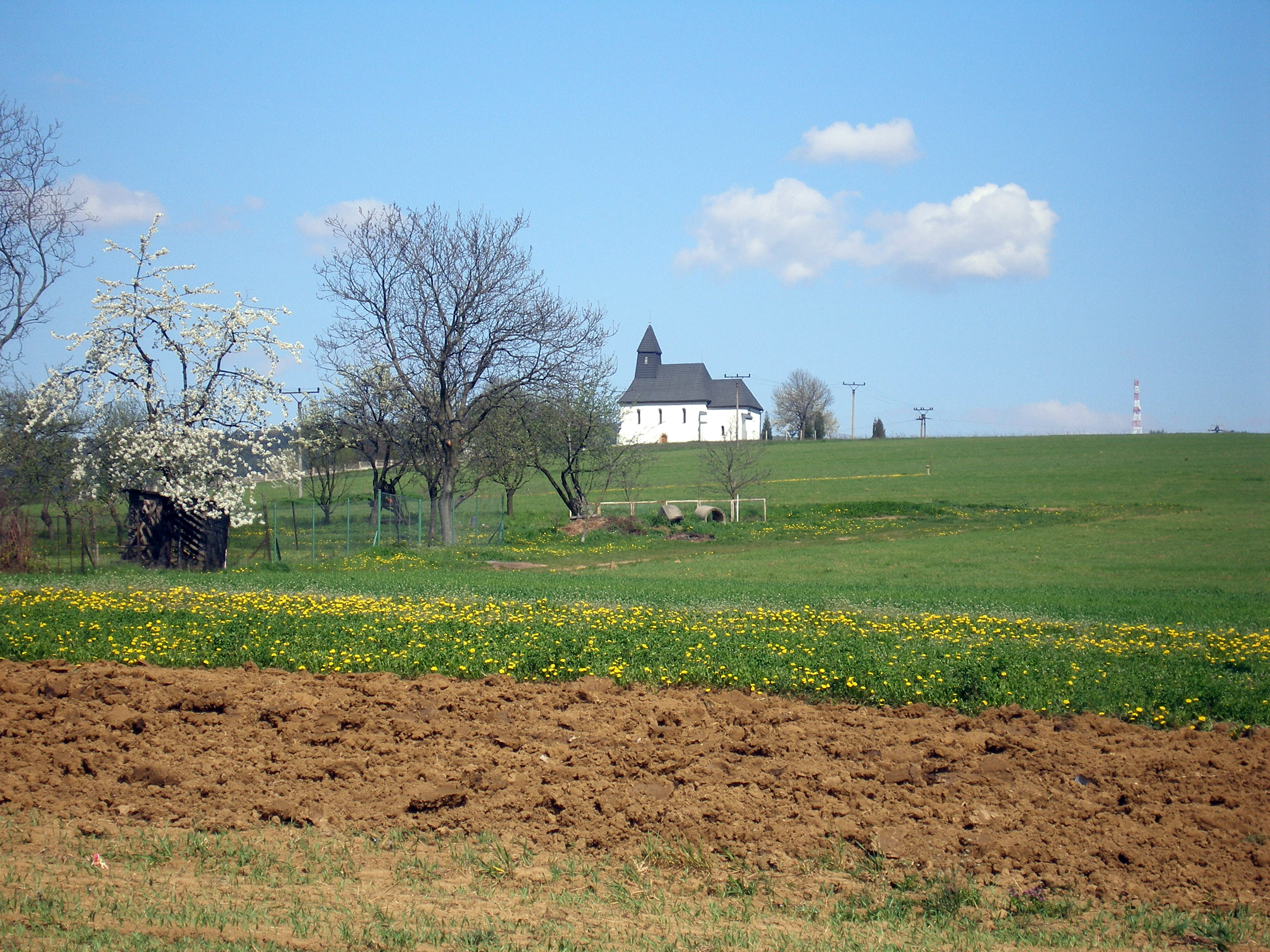

- Flag

- Location of Čelovce in the Prešov Region Location of Čelovce in Slovakia
- Coordinates: 49.08°N 21.40°E
- Country: Slovakia
- Region: Prešov Region
- District: Prešov District
- First mentioned: 1355

Area
  - Total: 3.99 km^{2} (1.54 sq mi)
- Elevation: 373 m (1,224 ft)

Population (2025)
  - Total: 394
- Time zone: UTC+1 (CET)
  - Summer (DST): UTC+2 (CEST)
- Postal code: 821 4
- Area code: +421 51
- Vehicle registration plate (until 2022): PO
- Website: www.obeccelovce.sk

Čelovce (Hungarian: Cselfalva) is a village and municipality in Prešov District in the Prešov Region of eastern Slovakia.

== History ==
In historical records the village was first mentioned in 1355.

== Geography ==
The municipality lies at an altitude of 373 metres (1,224 ft) and covers an area of 3.99 km^{2} (1.54 sq mi) (2025).

== Population ==
Population statistic (10 years)
Year	1995	2005	2015	2025
Count	269	304	324	394
Difference		+13.01%	+6.57%	+21.60%

Population statistic
Year	2024	2025
Count	394	394
Difference		+0%

It has a population of 394 people (31 December 2025).

=== Ethnicity ===
Census 2021 (1+ %)
Ethnicity	Number	Fraction
Slovak	354	99.71%
Rusyn	4	1.12%
Total	355	

In year 2021 was 355 people by ethnicity 354 as Slovak, 4 as Rusyn, 2 as Moravian and 1 as Not found out.

Note on population: The difference values of population numbers in the table "Population statistic" and in the sections "Ethnicity" & "Religion" is caused by the use of various statistical methods.

=== Religion ===
Census 2021 (1+ %)
Religion	Number	Fraction
Roman Catholic Church	249	70.14%
Evangelical Church	93	26.2%
None	9	2.54%
Total	355	

In year 2021 was 355 people by religion 249 from Roman Catholic Church, 93 from Evangelical Church, 9 from None, 3 from Greek Catholic Church and 1 from Not found out.

== Genealogical resources ==
The records for genealogical research are available at the state archive "Statny Archiv in Presov, Slovakia"

- Roman Catholic church records (births/marriages/deaths): 1788–1895 (parish B)
- Greek Catholic church records (births/marriages/deaths): 1818–1895 (parish B)
- Lutheran church records (births/marriages/deaths): 1724–1895 (parish B)

== See also ==
- List of municipalities and towns in Slovakia
