= Proč =

Village and municipality in Slovakia

- Municipality
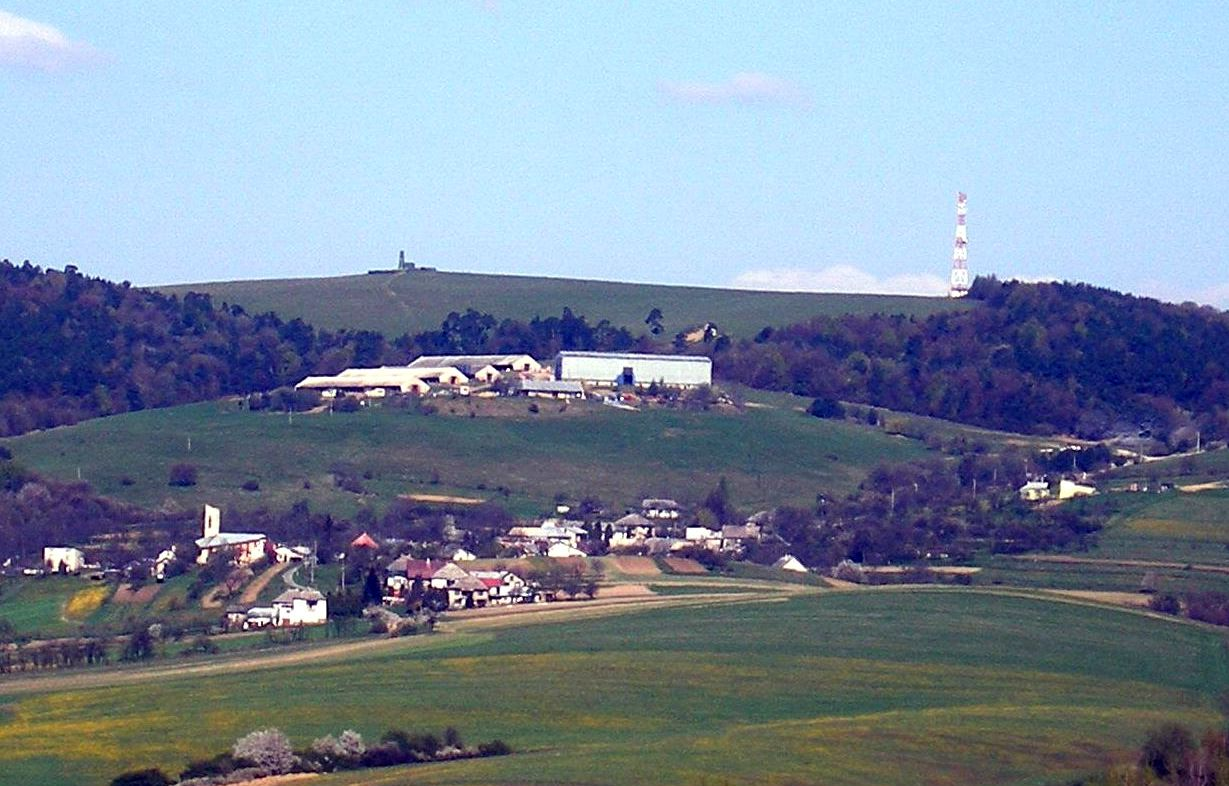

- Flag

- Location of Proč in the Prešov Region Location of Proč in Slovakia
- Coordinates: 49.10°N 21.40°E
- Country: Slovakia
- Region: Prešov Region
- District: Prešov District
- First mentioned: 1423

Area
  - Total: 5.85 km^{2} (2.26 sq mi)
- Elevation: 473 m (1,552 ft)

Population (2025)
  - Total: 403
- Time zone: UTC+1 (CET)
  - Summer (DST): UTC+2 (CEST)
- Postal code: 821 4
- Area code: +421 51
- Vehicle registration plate (until 2022): PO
- Website: proc.sk

Proč (Hungarian: Porócs) is a village and municipality in Prešov District in the Prešov Region of eastern Slovakia.

== History ==
In historical records the village was first mentioned in 1423.

== Geography ==
The municipality lies at an altitude of 473 metres (1,552 ft) and covers an area of 5.85 km^{2} (2.26 sq mi) (2025).

== Population ==
Population statistic (10 years)
Year	1995	2005	2015	2025
Count	454	438	423	403
Difference		−3.52%	−3.42%	−4.72%

Population statistic
Year	2024	2025
Count	409	403
Difference		−1.46%

It has a population of 403 people (31 December 2025).

=== Ethnicity ===
Census 2021 (1+ %)
Ethnicity	Number	Fraction
Slovak	394	98%
Not found out	8	1.99%
Total	402	

In year 2021 was 402 people by ethnicity 394 as Slovak, 8 as Not found out, 1 as Czech, 1 as Rusyn and 1 as Other.

Note on population: The difference values of population numbers in the table "Population statistic" and in the sections "Ethnicity" & "Religion" is caused by the use of various statistical methods.

=== Religion ===
Census 2021 (1+ %)
Religion	Number	Fraction
Roman Catholic Church	378	94.03%
Greek Catholic Church	9	2.24%
Not found out	7	1.74%
None	6	1.49%
Total	402	

In year 2021 was 402 people by religion 378 from Roman Catholic Church, 9 from Greek Catholic Church, 7 from Not found out, 6 from None, 1 from Eastern Orthodox Church and 1 from Other.
