= Čelovce, Veľký Krtíš District =

Čelovce Csall
- Municipality
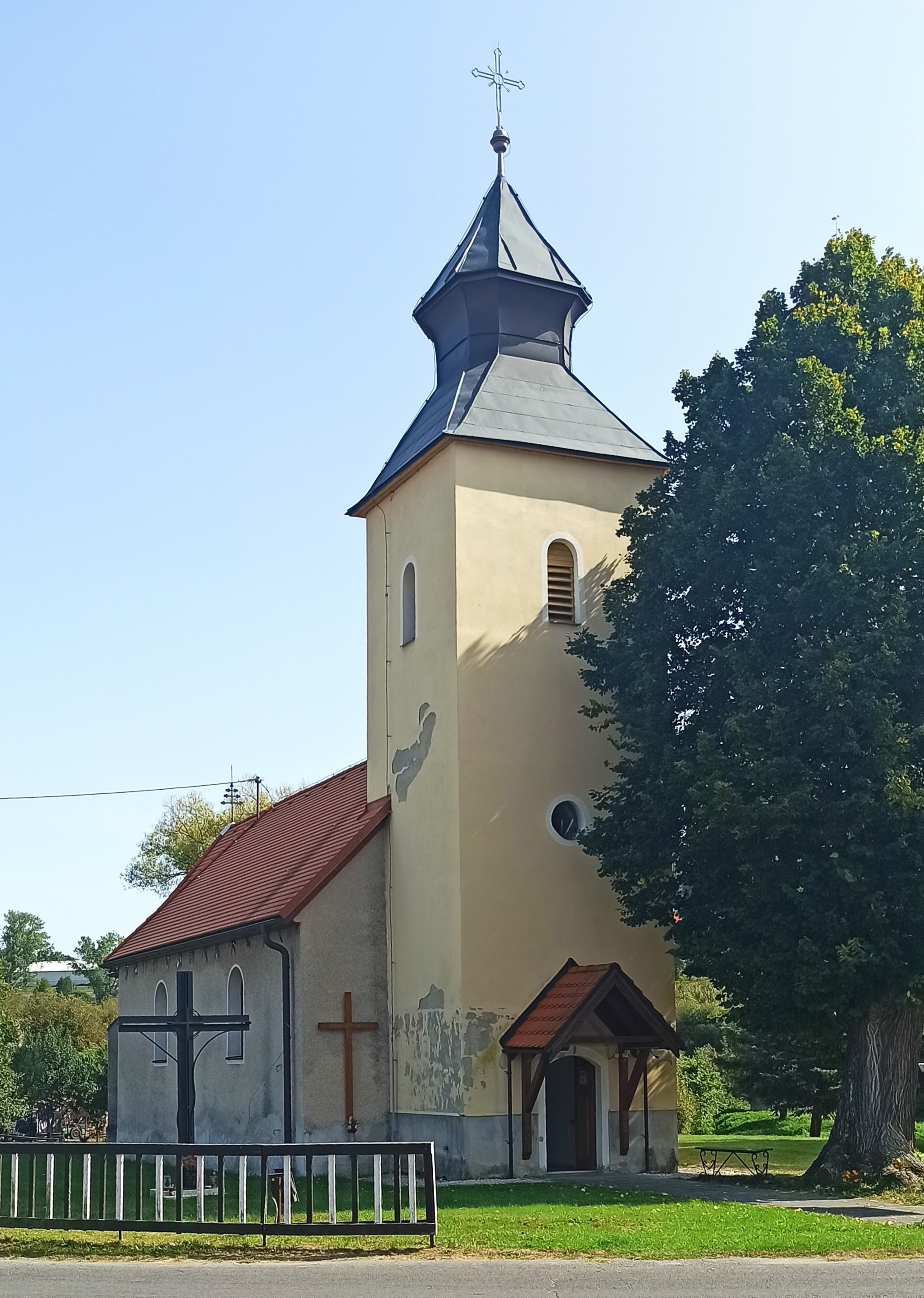

- Flag

- Location of Čelovce in the Banská Bystrica Region Location of Čelovce in Slovakia
- Coordinates: 48.18°N 19.14°E
- Country: Slovakia
- Region: Banská Bystrica Region
- District: Veľký Krtíš District
- First mentioned: 1295

Area
  - Total: 36.87 km^{2} (14.24 sq mi)
- Elevation: 346 m (1,135 ft)

Population (2025)
  - Total: 415
- Time zone: UTC+1 (CET)
  - Summer (DST): UTC+2 (CEST)
- Postal code: 991 41
- Area code: +421 47
- Vehicle registration plate (until 2022): VK
- Website: www.celovce.eu

Čelovce (Hungarian: Csall) is a village and municipality in the Veľký Krtíš District of the Banská Bystrica Region of southern Slovakia.

== History ==
The village was first mentioned in 1295 (Chal) when it belonged to Hunt family. In the 16th century it passed to Čabraď castle. During this time it suffered war destructions very much.

== Population ==
Population statistic (10 years)
Year	1995	2005	2015	2025
Count	354	453	443	415
Difference		+27.96%	−2.20%	−6.32%

Population statistic
Year	2024	2025
Count	418	415
Difference		−0.71%

It has a population of 415 people (31 December 2025).

=== Ethnicity ===
Census 2021 (1+ %)
Ethnicity	Number	Fraction
Slovak	419	97.21%
Romani	171	39.67%
Not found out	15	3.48%
Total	431	

In year 2021 was 431 people by ethnicity 419 as Slovak, 171 as Romani, 15 as Not found out, 4 as Ukrainian, 2 as Czech and 2 as Hungarian.

Note on population: The difference values of population numbers in the table "Population statistic" and in the sections "Ethnicity" & "Religion" is caused by the use of various statistical methods.

=== Religion ===
Census 2021 (1+ %)
Religion	Number	Fraction
Roman Catholic Church	273	63.34%
Evangelical Church	67	15.55%
None	58	13.46%
Not found out	24	5.57%
Eastern Orthodox Church	5	1.16%
Total	431	

In year 2021 was 431 people by religion 273 from Roman Catholic Church, 67 from Evangelical Church, 58 from None, 24 from Not found out, 5 from Eastern Orthodox Church, 3 from Paganism and natural spirituality and 1 from Other.

== Genealogical resources ==
The records for genealogical research are available at the state archive "Statny Archiv in Banska Bystrica, Slovakia"

- Roman Catholic church records (births/marriages/deaths): 1749-1895 (parish B)
- Lutheran church records (births/marriages/deaths): 1784-1896 (parish A)

== See also ==
- List of municipalities and towns in Slovakia
