= Záborské =

- Municipality
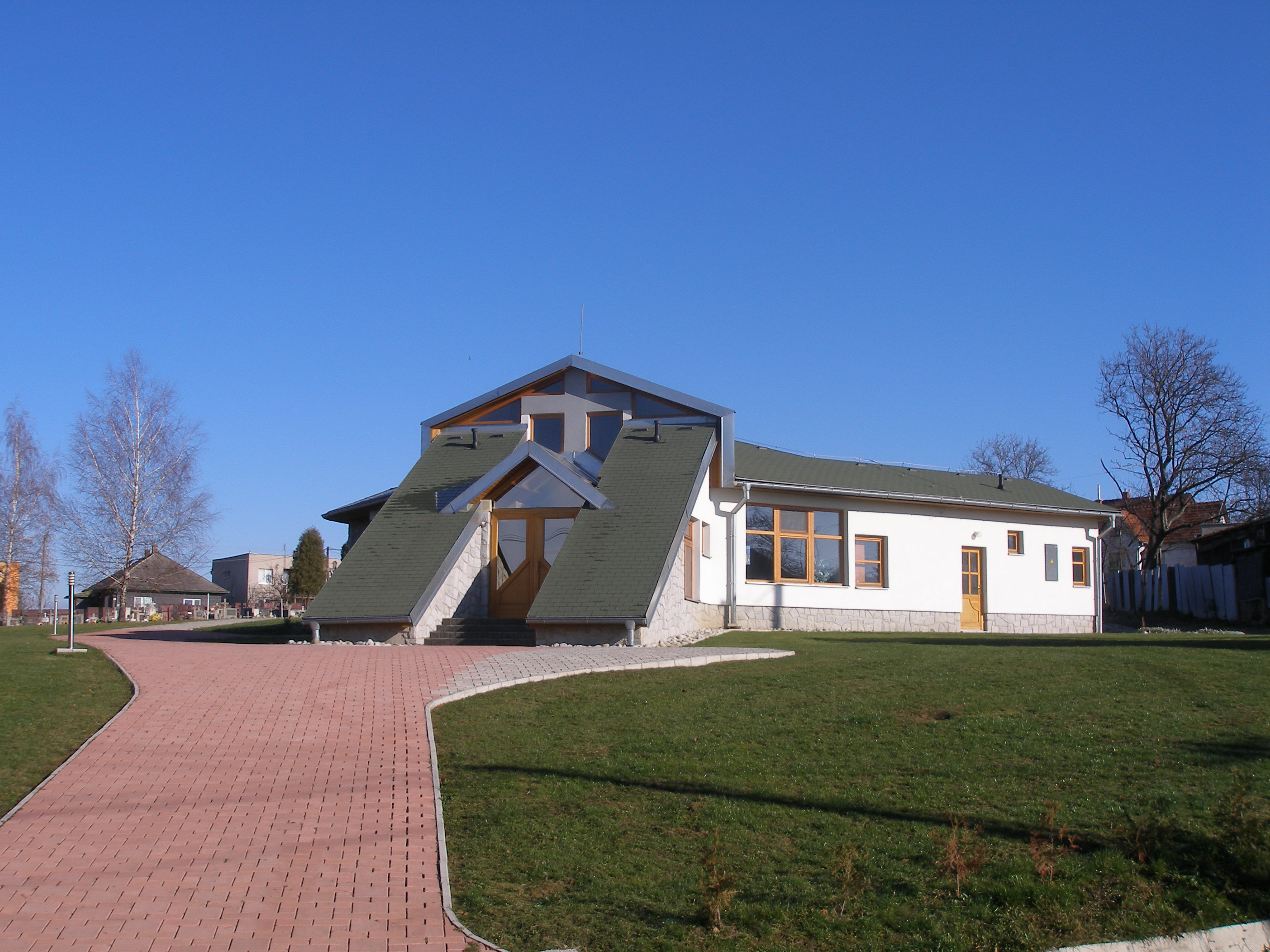

- Flag

- Location of Záborské in the Prešov Region Location of Záborské in Slovakia
- Coordinates: 48.95°N 21.30°E
- Country: Slovakia
- Region: Prešov Region
- District: Prešov District
- First mentioned: 1304

Area
  - Total: 5.38 km^{2} (2.08 sq mi)
- Elevation: 327 m (1,073 ft)

Population (2025)
  - Total: 1,243
- Time zone: UTC+1 (CET)
  - Summer (DST): UTC+2 (CEST)
- Postal code: 825 3
- Area code: +421 51
- Vehicle registration plate (until 2022): PO
- Website: www.obeczaborske.sk

Záborské (Hungarian: Harság) is a village and municipality in Prešov District in the Prešov Region of eastern Slovakia.

== History ==
The first written mention of the village dates back to 1303. The original name Haršag was derived from the Hungarian Harsagh-i. linden branch. The municipality had the property in the extent of 12 settlements, each of which consisted of 4 families with an area of about 30 ha of land.

In 1424, after the landowner Peteja became the owner of the village with mansion, land and other property landowner Farkaš, who owned this property until 1787 (that is 360 years). Farkaš family in the village was replaced by the Zaturecky family, who owned the village and its property until the beginning of the 20th century, probably until 1908. Under the Zatureckých family was in the village 1841 built by Roman Church dedicated to the Assumption of the Virgin Mary. It was built on the original cemetery. Family of Zaturecki had a chapel built to honor St. Cross – in the castle mansion and at the entrance to the new cemetery a chapel to honor St. John Nepomuk.

After the Zaturecki family, the land estate was divided so that a manor house with a garden was bought by a lawyer from Prešov – Dr. Kakusz Bela and land in the extravaganza were bought by harshack peasants and jellies. Dr. Kakusz sold the mansion with garden and farm building in 1919 local citizen Juraj Žula.

The village has its current name since 1948. We are a suburban village of Prešov. The center of the village has an altitude of 319 m. The Záborský brook flows through its center and flows into the Torysa River. The village has a very convenient location to the city of Presov, which makes it easier for citizens to access jobs, culture, sports and education.

Name of the village in individual years:

- 1303 – Hasag
- 1773 – Harsagh
- 1786 – Harschagy
- 1920 – Haršak
- 1927 – Haršag
- since 1948 – Záborské.

== Geography ==
The municipality lies at an altitude of 327 metres (1,073 ft) and covers an area of 5.38 km^{2} (2.08 sq mi) (2025).

== Population ==
Population statistic (10 years)
Year	1995	2005	2015	2025
Count	419	523	753	1243
Difference		+24.82%	+43.97%	+65.07%

Population statistic
Year	2024	2025
Count	1219	1243
Difference		+1.96%

It has a population of 1243 people (31 December 2025).

=== Ethnicity ===
Census 2021 (1+ %)
Ethnicity	Number	Fraction
Slovak	1066	98.7%
Rusyn	41	3.79%
Other	12	1.11%
Total	1080	

In year 2021 was 1080 people by ethnicity 1066 as Slovak, 41 as Rusyn, 12 as Other, 9 as Not found out, 4 as Ukrainian, 3 as Polish, 2 as Czech, 1 as Russian and 1 as Hungarian.

Note on population: The difference values of population numbers in the table "Population statistic" and in the sections "Ethnicity" & "Religion" is caused by the use of various statistical methods.

=== Religion ===
Census 2021 (1+ %)
Religion	Number	Fraction
Roman Catholic Church	786	72.78%
Greek Catholic Church	128	11.85%
None	117	10.83%
Evangelical Church	21	1.94%
Eastern Orthodox Church	11	1.02%
Total	1080	

In year 2021 was 1080 people by religion 786 from Roman Catholic Church, 128 from Greek Catholic Church, 117 from None, 21 from Evangelical Church, 11 from Eastern Orthodox Church, 4 from Not found out, 3 from Apostolic Church, 3 from Ad hoc movements, 2 from Other, 2 from Buddhism, 1 from Calvinist Church, 1 from Christian Congregations in Slovakia and 1 from Baptists Church.
