= Nemcovce =

Nemcovce may refer to several places in Slovakia notably in the Prešov Region.

- Nemcovce, Bardejov District
- Nemcovce, Prešov District
