= Nemcovce, Prešov District =

Nemcovce
- Municipality
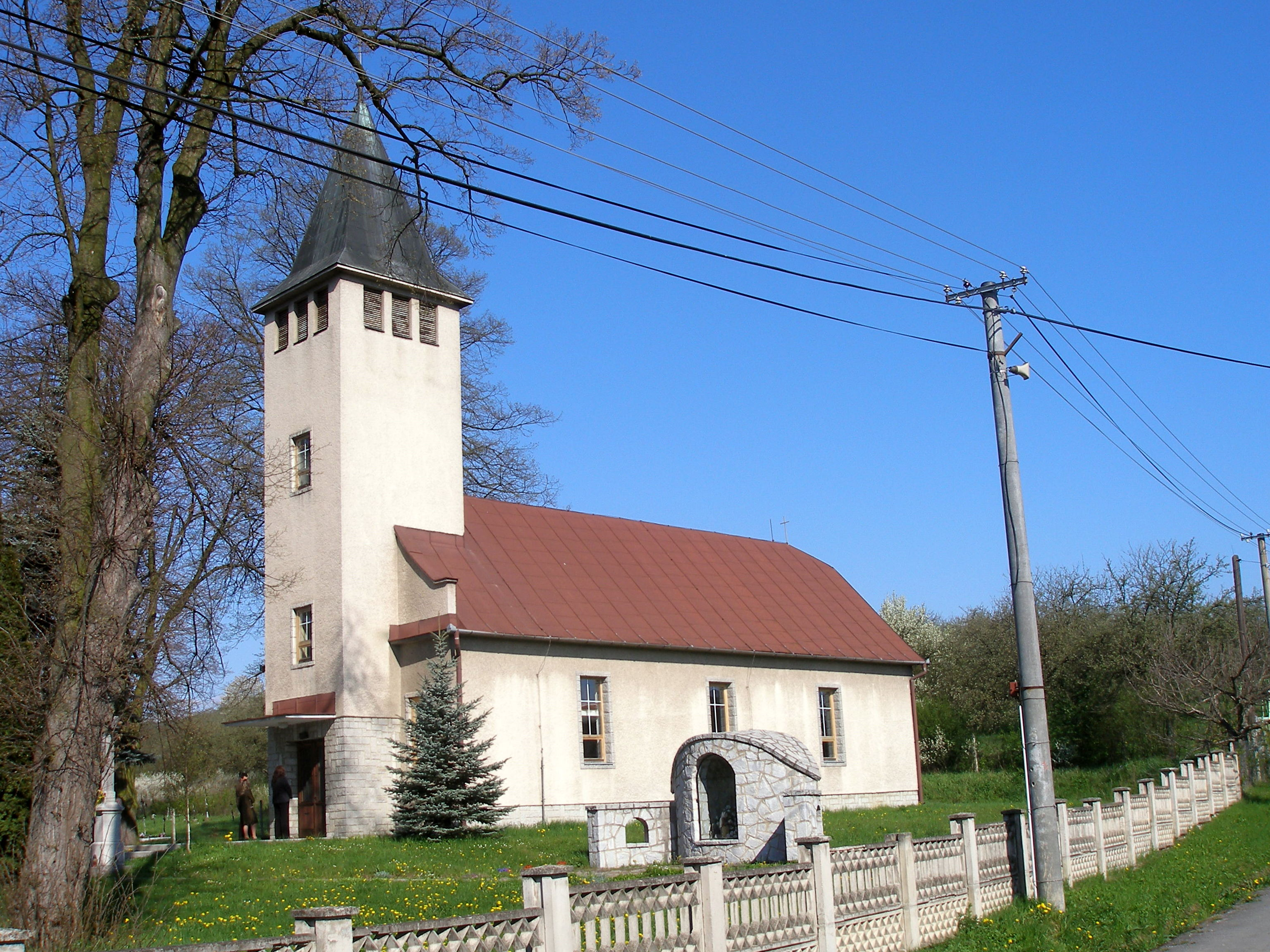

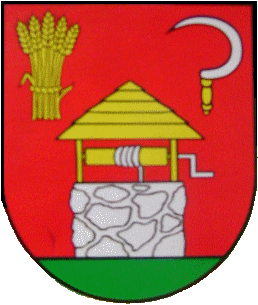
- Flag Coat of arms

- Location of Nemcovce in the Prešov Region Location of Nemcovce in Slovakia
- Coordinates: 49.05°N 21.38°E
- Country: Slovakia
- Region: Prešov Region
- District: Prešov District
- First mentioned: 1364

Area
  - Total: 5.73 km^{2} (2.21 sq mi)
- Elevation: 304 m (997 ft)

Population (2025)
  - Total: 476
- Time zone: UTC+1 (CET)
  - Summer (DST): UTC+2 (CEST)
- Postal code: 821 2
- Area code: +421 51
- Vehicle registration plate (until 2022): PO
- Website: obecnemcovce.sk

Nemcovce (Hungarian: Kapinémetfalu) is a small village and municipality in Prešov District in the Prešov Region of north Slovakia.

== History ==
In historical records the village was first mentioned in 1364.

== Geography ==
The municipality lies at an altitude of 304 metres (997 ft) and covers an area of 5.73 km^{2} (2.21 sq mi) (2025).

== Population ==
Population statistic (10 years)
Year	1995	2005	2015	2025
Count	408	453	469	476
Difference		+11.02%	+3.53%	+1.49%

Population statistic
Year	2024	2025
Count	478	476
Difference		−0.41%

It has a population of 476 people (31 December 2025).

=== Ethnicity ===
Census 2021 (1+ %)
Ethnicity	Number	Fraction
Slovak	466	97.89%
Not found out	9	1.89%
Total	476	

In year 2021 was 476 people by ethnicity 466 as Slovak, 9 as Not found out, 3 as Czech, 2 as Romani, 2 as Moravian, 1 as Rusyn, 1 as Russian and 1 as Other.

Note on population: The difference values of population numbers in the table "Population statistic" and in the sections "Ethnicity" & "Religion" is caused by the use of various statistical methods.

=== Religion ===
Census 2021 (1+ %)
Religion	Number	Fraction
Roman Catholic Church	278	58.4%
Evangelical Church	145	30.46%
None	26	5.46%
Greek Catholic Church	11	2.31%
Not found out	7	1.47%
Total	476	

In year 2021 was 476 people by religion 278 from Roman Catholic Church, 145 from Evangelical Church, 26 from None, 11 from Greek Catholic Church, 7 from Not found out, 4 from Seventh-day Adventist Church, 2 from Other, 2 from Ad hoc movements and 1 from Hinduism.
