= Babin =

Babin may refer to:

== Places ==
=== Bosnia and Herzegovina ===
- Babin Do, Neum, village in the Neum municipality
- Babin Do, Šipovo, village in the Šipovo municipality
- Babin Potok, Donji Vakuf, village in the Donji Vakuf municipality
- Babin Potok, Višegrad, village in the Višegrad municipality

=== Indonesia ===
- Babin Bridge, connecting the islands of Batam and Bintan

=== Poland ===
- Babin, Gryfino County in West Pomeranian Voivodeship (north-west Poland)
- Babin, Lublin Voivodeship (east Poland)
- Babin, Lower Silesian Voivodeship (south-west Poland)
- Babin, Masovian Voivodeship (east-central Poland)
- Babin, Pyrzyce County in West Pomeranian Voivodeship (north-west Poland)
- Babin, Słupca County in Greater Poland Voivodeship (west-central Poland)
- Babin, Gmina Środa Wielkopolska, Środa County in Greater Poland Voivodeship (west-central Poland)
- Babin, Szczecin, neighborhood in the city of Szczecin

=== Slovakia ===
- Babín, village and municipality

=== Ukraine ===
- Babin, the Romanian name for Babyn, Zastavna Raion, Chernivtsi Oblast
- Babin, the Romanian name for Babyne village, Karapchiv, Vyzhnytsia Raion, Chernivtsi Oblast

== Other uses ==
- Babin (surname)
- Vronsky & Babin, Russian piano duo
- Babin Republic, Polish satirical, literary and carnival society founded in 1568

== See also ==
- Babina (disambiguation)
