= Hronská Breznica =

Hronská Breznica Garamberzence
- Municipality
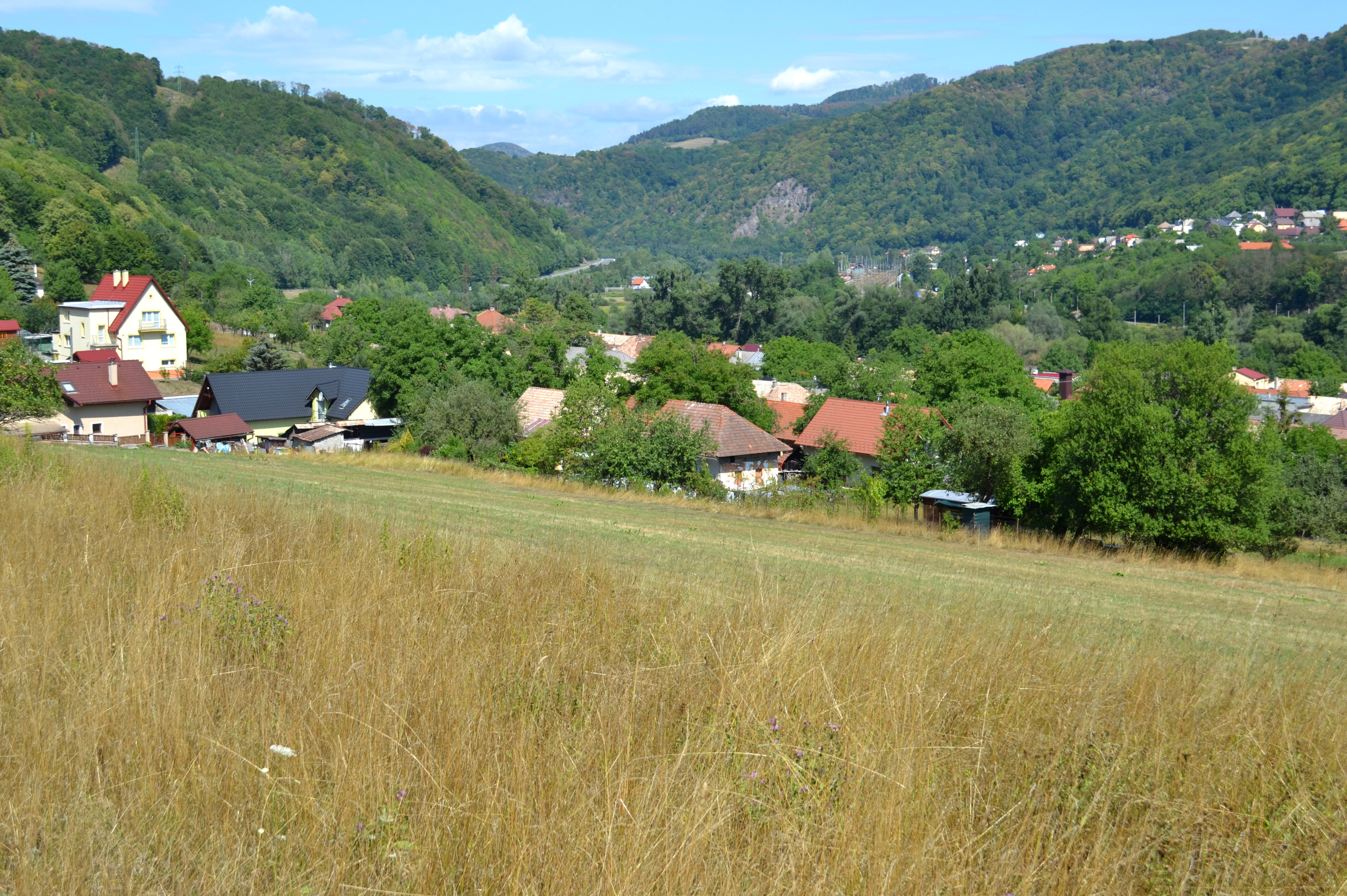

- Flag

- Location of Hronská Breznica in the Banská Bystrica Region Location of Hronská Breznica in Slovakia
- Coordinates: 48.57°N 19.00°E
- Country: Slovakia
- Region: Banská Bystrica Region
- District: Zvolen District
- First mentioned: 1424

Area
  - Total: 9.51 km^{2} (3.67 sq mi)
- Elevation: 268 m (879 ft)

Population (2025)
  - Total: 249
- Time zone: UTC+1 (CET)
  - Summer (DST): UTC+2 (CEST)
- Postal code: 966 12
- Area code: +421 45
- Vehicle registration plate (until 2022): ZV
- Website: www.hronskabreznica.sk

Hronská Breznica (Hungarian: Garamberzence) is a village and municipality of the Zvolen District in the Banská Bystrica Region of Slovakia.

== Geography ==
The municipality lies at an altitude of 268 metres (879 ft) and covers an area of 9.51 km^{2} (3.67 sq mi) (2025).

== History ==
In historical records, the village was first mentioned in 1424 (Berzenche). It belonged, in dither order, to Dobrá Niva, György Thurzó (16th century) and Banská Bystrica’s Chamber. Before the establishment of independent Czechoslovakia in 1918, Hronská Breznica was part of Zólyom County within the Kingdom of Hungary. From 1939 to 1945, it was part of the Slovak Republic.

== Population ==
Population statistic (10 years)
Year	1995	2005	2015	2025
Count	276	274	257	249
Difference		−0.72%	−6.20%	−3.11%

Population statistic
Year	2024	2025
Count	251	249
Difference		−0.79%

It has a population of 249 people (31 December 2025).

=== Ethnicity ===
Census 2021 (1+ %)
Ethnicity	Number	Fraction
Slovak	241	93.41%
Not found out	13	5.03%
Romani	5	1.93%
Hungarian	3	1.16%
Total	258	

In year 2021 was 258 people by ethnicity 241 as Slovak, 13 as Not found out, 5 as Romani, 3 as Hungarian and 2 as Czech.

Note on population: The difference values of population numbers in the table "Population statistic" and in the sections "Ethnicity" & "Religion" is caused by the use of various statistical methods.

=== Religion ===
Census 2021 (1+ %)
Religion	Number	Fraction
Evangelical Church	98	37.98%
Roman Catholic Church	93	36.05%
None	48	18.6%
Not found out	13	5.04%
Total	258	

In year 2021 was 258 people by religion 98 from Evangelical Church, 93 from Roman Catholic Church, 48 from None, 13 from Not found out, 2 from Other and not ascertained christian church, 2 from United Methodist Church, 1 from Calvinist Church and 1 from Ad hoc movements.
