= Dubové, Zvolen District =

Dubové Dobó
- Municipality
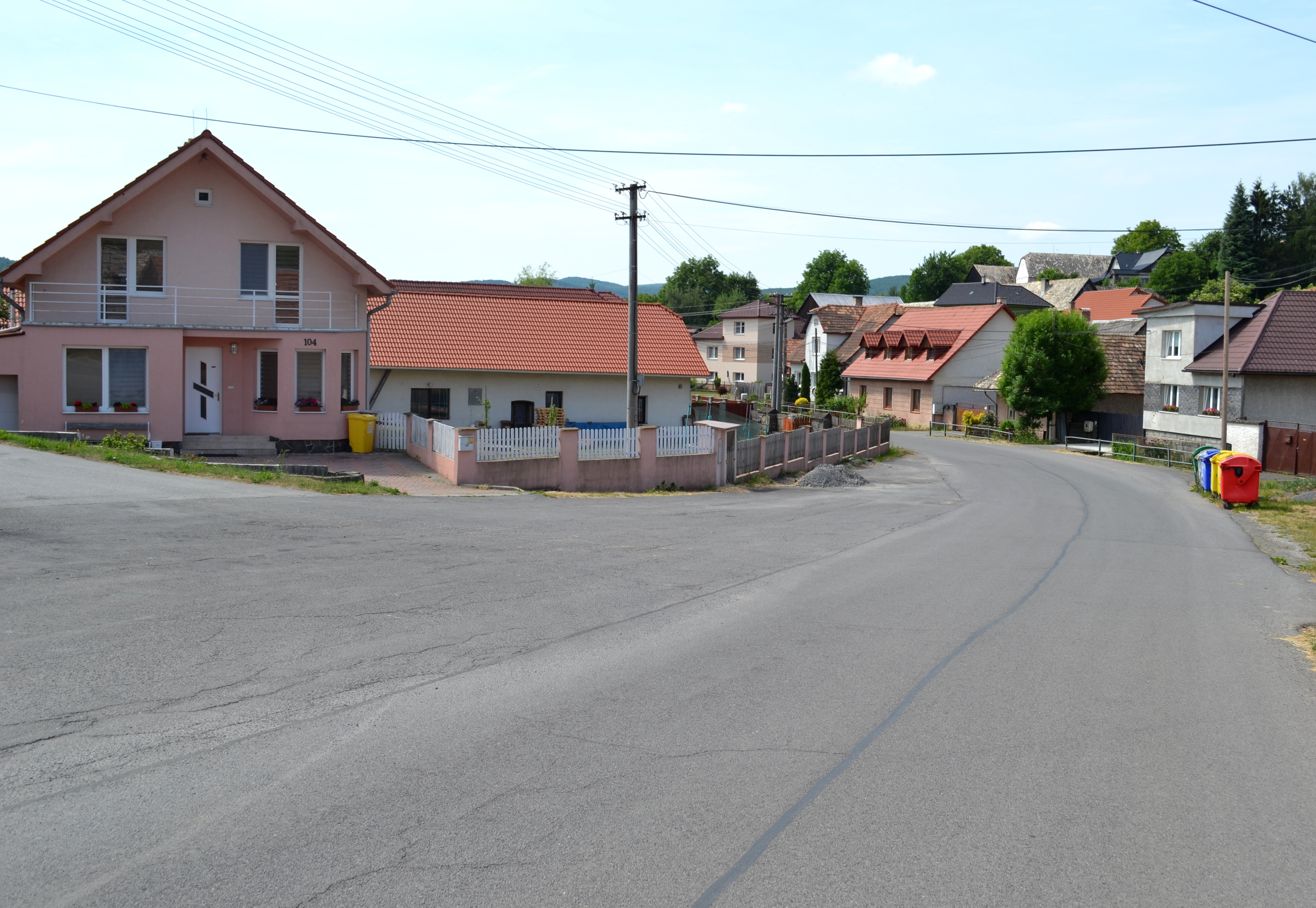

- Flag

- Location of Dubové in the Banská Bystrica Region Location of Dubové in Slovakia
- Coordinates: 48.50°N 19.05°E
- Country: Slovakia
- Region: Banská Bystrica Region
- District: Zvolen District
- First mentioned: 1255

Area
  - Total: 13.29 km^{2} (5.13 sq mi)
- Elevation: 422 m (1,385 ft)

Population (2025)
  - Total: 412
- Time zone: UTC+1 (CET)
  - Summer (DST): UTC+2 (CEST)
- Postal code: 962 36
- Area code: +421 45
- Vehicle registration plate (until 2022): ZV
- Website: www.obecdubove.sk

Dubové (Hungarian: Dobó) is a village and municipality of the Zvolen District in the Banská Bystrica Region of Slovakia.

== History ==
In historical records, the village was first mentioned in 1225 when King Bela IV donated it to a certain Pertold from Zvolen. In 1287 it passed to a certain Termanus, knight Arnold's son from Banská Štiavnica. After that it belonged to Dobrá Niva. Later on, it belonged to Banská Štiavnica. Before the establishment of independent Czechoslovakia in 1918, Dubové was part of Zólyom County within the Kingdom of Hungary. From 1939 to 1945, it was part of the Slovak Republic.

== Population ==
Population statistic (10 years)
Year	1995	2005	2015	2025
Count	241	246	266	412
Difference		+2.07%	+8.13%	+54.88%

Population statistic
Year	2024	2025
Count	385	412
Difference		+7.01%

It has a population of 412 people (31 December 2025).

=== Ethnicity ===
Census 2021 (1+ %)
Ethnicity	Number	Fraction
Slovak	310	96.87%
Not found out	6	1.87%
Romanian	5	1.56%
Total	320	

In year 2021 was 320 people by ethnicity 310 as Slovak, 6 as Not found out, 5 as Romanian, 3 as Romani, 3 as Rusyn, 2 as Czech, 1 as Silesian and 1 as Hungarian.

Note on population: The difference values of population numbers in the table "Population statistic" and in the sections "Ethnicity" & "Religion" is caused by the use of various statistical methods.

=== Religion ===
Census 2021 (1+ %)
Religion	Number	Fraction
Roman Catholic Church	117	36.56%
Evangelical Church	101	31.56%
None	75	23.44%
Not found out	11	3.44%
Greek Catholic Church	8	2.5%
Eastern Orthodox Church	4	1.25%
Total	320	

In year 2021 was 320 people by religion 117 from Roman Catholic Church, 101 from Evangelical Church, 75 from None, 11 from Not found out, 8 from Greek Catholic Church, 4 from Eastern Orthodox Church, 3 from Jehovah's Witnesses and 1 from Other.
