= Babina =

Babina may refer to:

== Places ==
- Babina, Uttar Pradesh, cantonment town in Jhansi district in the state of Uttar Pradesh, India
- Babiná, village and municipality of the Zvolen District in the Banská Bystrica Region, Slovakia
- Babina Greda, village and municipality in Vukovar-Srijem County, Croatia
- Babina Luka, village in the municipality of Valjevo, Serbia
- Babina Rijeka, village in Donji Kukuruzari municipality, Croatia
- Babina Stena, peak in Kosovo

== Other uses ==
- Babina (film), a 2000 Ghanaian film
- Babina (frog), frog genus
- Carine Babina (born 1994), Congolese handball player
