= Babin (surname) =

Babin is a surname. Notable people with the name include:

- Brian Babin (born 1948), American dentist and politician from Texas
- Éric Babin (1959–2021) is a New Caledonian politician
- Gustave Babin (1865–1939), French journalist
- Jason Babin (born 1980), American football player
- Jean-Sylvain Babin (born 1986), Martiniquais football player
- Lucas Babin (born 1979), American actor
- Magali Babin (born 1967), Canadian musician, composer and performance artist
- Mark Babin, American politician
- María Teresa Babín Cortés (1910–1989), Puerto Rican educator, literary critic, and essayist whose father was born in the French insular region of Guadeloupe
- Mitch Babin (born 1954), Canadian ice hockey player
- Nicolas Babin (born 1966), French businessman
- Peggy Babin (born 1976), French athlete
- Rex Babin (1962–2012), American political cartoonist
- Sergei Babin, Russian police officer
- Stanley Babin (1932–2010), Latvian composer and pianist
- Victor Babin (1908–1972), half of the Russian piano duo Vronsky & Babin
