= Ostra Luka =

Ostra Luka may refer to:

- Oštra Luka, a municipality in Bosnia
- Ostrá Lúka, a village and municipality in southern Slovakia
