= Bacúrov =

Bacúrov Bacúr
- Municipality
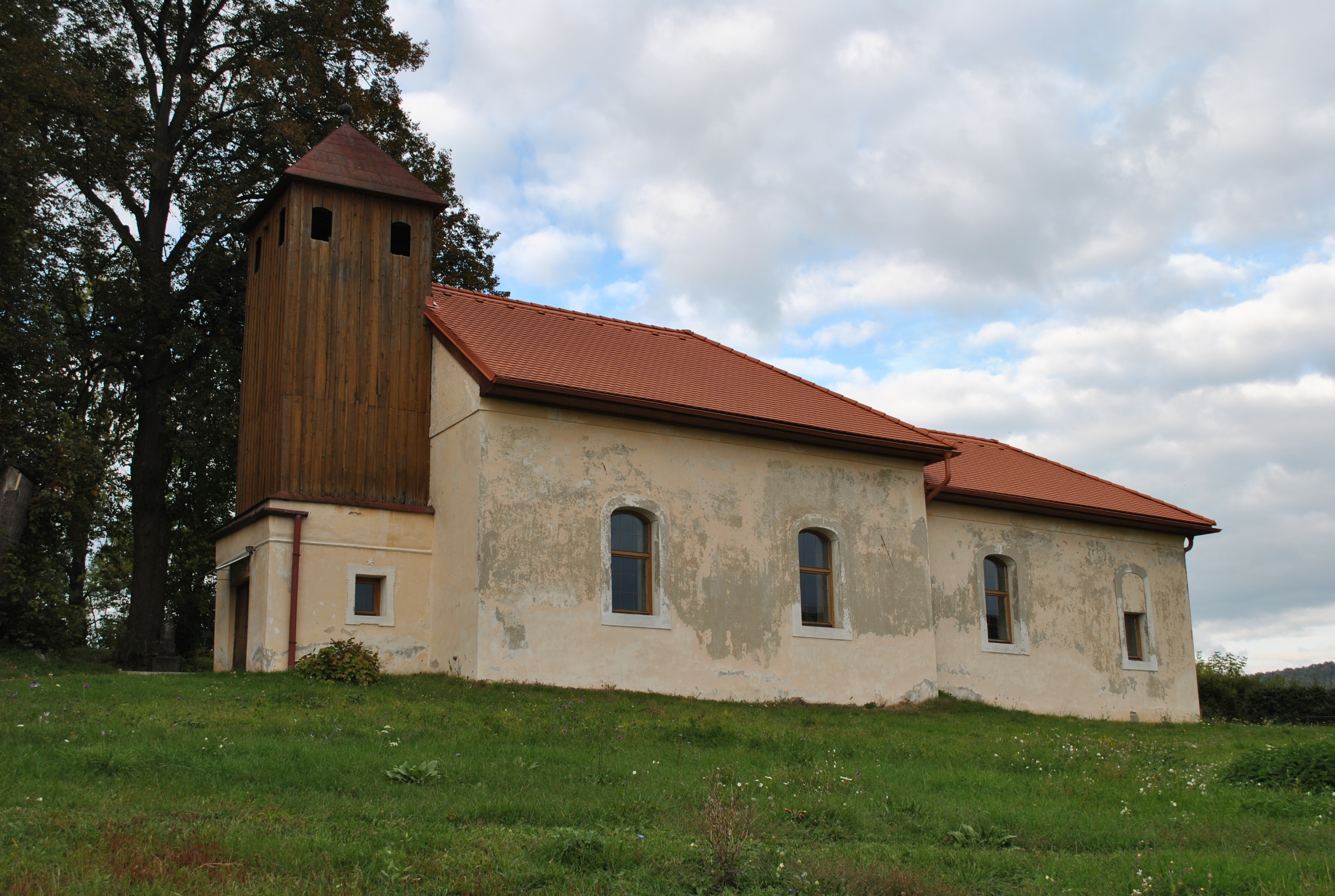

- Flag

- Location of Bacúrov in the Banská Bystrica Region Location of Bacúrov in Slovakia
- Coordinates: 48.52°N 19.07°E
- Country: Slovakia
- Region: Banská Bystrica Region
- District: Zvolen District
- First mentioned: 1255

Area
  - Total: 9.60 km^{2} (3.71 sq mi)
- Elevation: 452 m (1,483 ft)

Population (2025)
  - Total: 159
- Time zone: UTC+1 (CET)
  - Summer (DST): UTC+2 (CEST)
- Postal code: 962 61
- Area code: +421 45
- Vehicle registration plate (until 2022): ZV
- Website: www.bacurov.sk

Bacúrov (German: Wasserau; Hungarian: Bacúr) is a village and municipality in the Zvolen District in the Banská Bystrica Region of Slovakia.

== Geography ==
The municipality lies at an altitude of 452 metres (1,483 ft) and covers an area of 9.60 km^{2} (3.71 sq mi) (2025).

== History ==
The earliest written reference of Bacúrov dates from 1255 when the village was known as Villa Bochorou (Wasseraw in old German). The historical background of Bacúrov reflects the geographical location of the village. It is situated near the significant historical mining towns of Banská Štiavnica, Banská Bystrica, and Kremnica, the village was in the spotlight of many historical events. In mid-16th century during the Turkish invasions, the local villagers were responsible for road guarding. Tatars were also threatening the existence of the village. In the late 16th century, they used to camp just on the outskirts of Bacúrov and Ostrá Lúka. Before the establishment of an independent Czechoslovakia in 1918, Bacúrov was part of Zólyom County within the Kingdom of Hungary. From 1939 to 1945, it was part of the Slovak Republic.

== Population ==
Population statistic (10 years)
| Year | 1995 | 2005 | 2015 | 2025 |
|---|---|---|---|---|
| Count | 101 | 131 | 160 | 159 |
| Difference | | +29.70% | +22.13% | −0.62% |

Population statistic
| Year | 2024 | 2025 |
|---|---|---|
| Count | 159 | 159 |
| Difference | | +0% |

It has a population of 159 people (31 December 2025).

=== Ethnicity ===
Census 2021 (1+ %)
| Ethnicity | Number | Fraction |
|---|---|---|
| Slovak | 155 | 98.1% |
| Not found out | 3 | 1.89% |
| Total | 158 | |

In year 2021 was 158 people by ethnicity 155 as Slovak, 3 as Not found out, 1 as Rusyn and 1 as Hungarian.

Note on population: The difference values of population numbers in the table "Population statistic" and in the sections "Ethnicity" & "Religion" is caused by the use of various statistical methods.

=== Religion ===
Census 2021 (1+ %)
| Religion | Number | Fraction |
|---|---|---|
| None | 53 | 33.54% |
| Evangelical Church | 45 | 28.48% |
| Roman Catholic Church | 40 | 25.32% |
| Other and not ascertained christian church | 6 | 3.8% |
| Eastern Orthodox Church | 5 | 3.16% |
| Other | 3 | 1.9% |
| Greek Catholic Church | 3 | 1.9% |
| Not found out | 2 | 1.27% |
| Total | 158 | |

In year 2021 was 158 people by religion 53 from None, 45 from Evangelical Church, 40 from Roman Catholic Church, 6 from Other and not ascertained christian church, 5 from Eastern Orthodox Church, 3 from Other, 3 from Greek Catholic Church, 2 from Not found out and 1 from Ad hoc movements.

== Genealogical resources ==
The records for genealogical research are available at the state archive in Banská Bystrica (Slovak: Štátny archív v Banskej Bystrici).

- Roman Catholic church records (births/marriages/deaths): 1786-1912 (parish A)
- Lutheran church records (births/marriages/deaths): 1738-1909
- Census records 1869 of Bacurov are not available at the state archive.

== See also ==
- List of municipalities and towns in Slovakia
