= Lieskovec, Zvolen District =

Lieskovec Újmogyoród
- Municipality
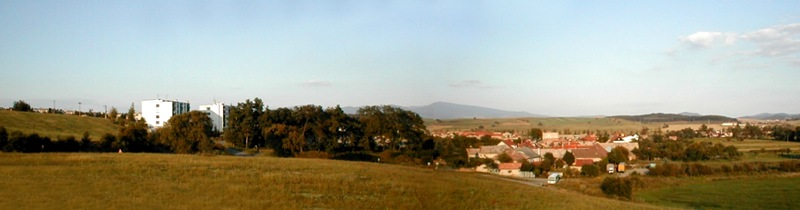

- Flag Coat of arms

- Location of Lieskovec in the Banská Bystrica Region Location of Lieskovec in Slovakia
- Coordinates: 48.58°N 19.19°E
- Country: Slovakia
- Region: Banská Bystrica Region
- District: Zvolen District
- First mentioned: 1401

Area
  - Total: 13.89 km^{2} (5.36 sq mi)
- Elevation: 304 m (997 ft)

Population (2025)
  - Total: 1,360
- Time zone: UTC+1 (CET)
  - Summer (DST): UTC+2 (CEST)
- Postal code: 962 21
- Area code: +421 45
- Vehicle registration plate (until 2022): ZV
- Website: www.obeclieskovec.sk

Lieskovec (Hungarian: Újmogyoród) is a village and municipality of the Zvolen District in the Banská Bystrica Region of Slovakia.

== Population ==
Population statistic (10 years)
Year	1995	2005	2015	2025
Count	1389	1400	1434	1360
Difference		+0.79%	+2.42%	−5.16%

Population statistic
Year	2024	2025
Count	1372	1360
Difference		−0.87%

It has a population of 1360 people (31 December 2025).

=== Ethnicity ===
Census 2021 (1+ %)
Ethnicity	Number	Fraction
Slovak	1364	96.8%
Not found out	38	2.69%
Romani	16	1.13%
Total	1409	

In year 2021 was 1409 people by ethnicity 1364 as Slovak, 38 as Not found out, 16 as Romani, 6 as Czech, 3 as Hungarian, 2 as Russian and 2 as Other.

Note on population: The difference values of population numbers in the table "Population statistic" and in the sections "Ethnicity" & "Religion" is caused by the use of various statistical methods.

=== Religion ===
Census 2021 (1+ %)
Religion	Number	Fraction
Roman Catholic Church	543	38.54%
None	410	29.1%
Evangelical Church	352	24.98%
Not found out	38	2.7%
Greek Catholic Church	15	1.06%
Total	1409	

In year 2021 was 1409 people by religion 543 from Roman Catholic Church, 410 from None, 352 from Evangelical Church, 38 from Not found out, 15 from Greek Catholic Church, 11 from Other, 10 from Apostolic Church, 5 from Seventh-day Adventist Church, 5 from Ad hoc movements, 4 from Old Catholic Church, 4 from Other and not ascertained christian church, 3 from Calvinist Church, 2 from Jehovah's Witnesses, 2 from Buddhism, 1 from Eastern Orthodox Church, 1 from Paganism and natural spirituality, 1 from Christian Congregations in Slovakia, 1 from Islam and 1 from United Methodist Church.

== History ==
Before the establishment of independent Czechoslovakia in 1918, Lieskovec was part of Zólyom County within the Kingdom of Hungary. From 1939 to 1945, it was part of the Slovak Republic.
