= Babiná =

Babiná Bábaszék
- Municipality
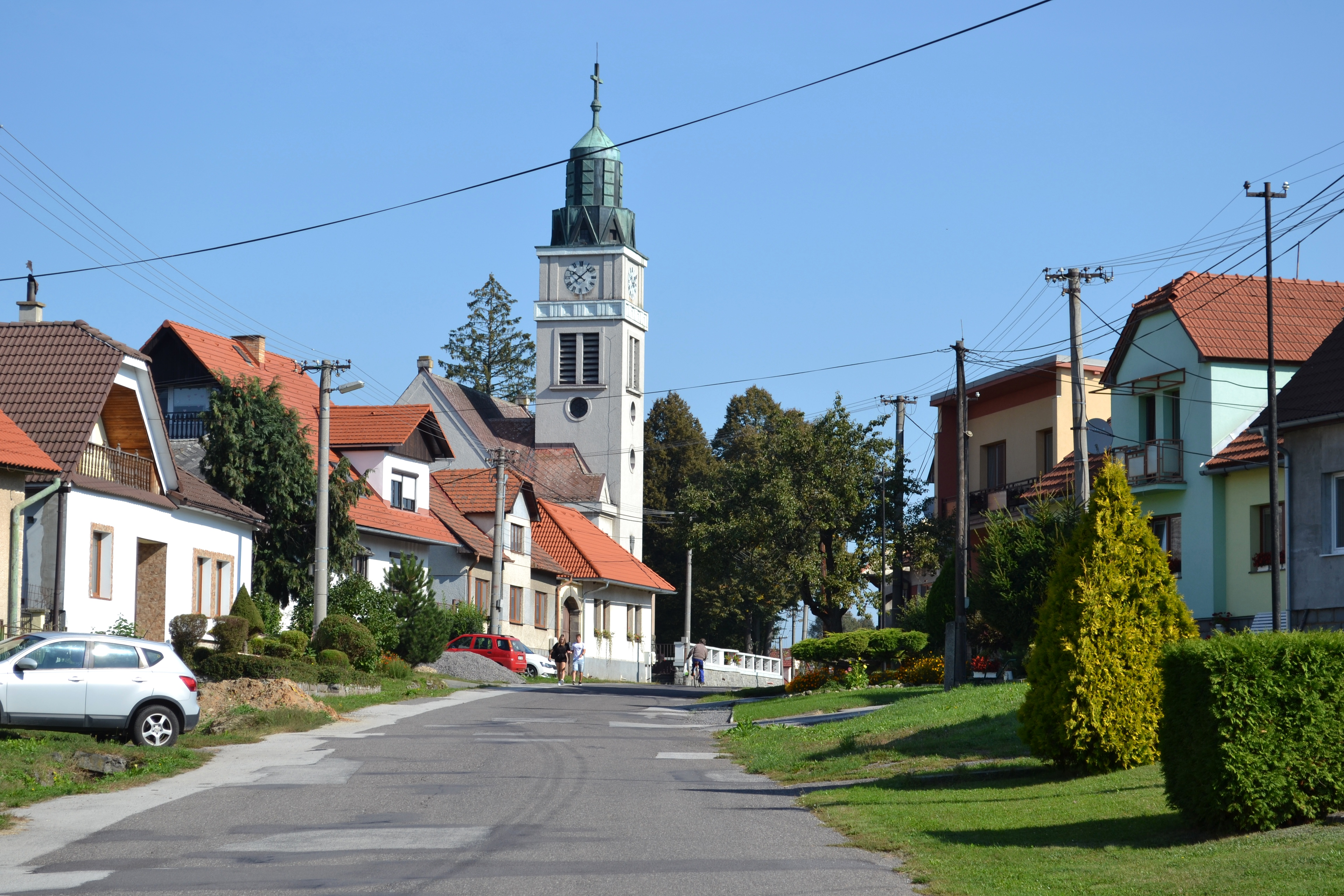

- Flag

- Location of Babiná in the Banská Bystrica Region Location of Babiná in Slovakia
- Coordinates: 48.43°N 19.10°E
- Country: Slovakia
- Region: Banská Bystrica Region
- District: Zvolen District
- First mentioned: 1254

Area
  - Total: 22.17 km^{2} (8.56 sq mi)
- Elevation: 418 m (1,371 ft)

Population (2025)
  - Total: 548
- Time zone: UTC+1 (CET)
  - Summer (DST): UTC+2 (CEST)
- Postal code: 962 64
- Area code: +421 45
- Vehicle registration plate (until 2022): ZV
- Website: www.babina.sk

Babiná (German: Frauenstuhl; Hungarian: Bábaszék) is a village and municipality of the Zvolen District in the Banská Bystrica Region of Slovakia

== Geography ==
The municipality lies at an altitude of 418 metres (1,371 ft) and covers an area of 22.17 km^{2} (8.56 sq mi) (2025).

== History ==
In historical records, the village was first mentioned in 1254. In 1270 German colonists settled here. It belonged to Dobrá Niva. in the 16th century it had to pay tributes to Turks. In the 17th century, it belonged to the Esterházy family. Before the establishment of independent Czechoslovakia in 1918, Babiná was part of Zólyom County within the Kingdom of Hungary. From 1939 to 1945, it was part of the Slovak Republic.

== Genealogical resources ==
The records for genealogical research are available at the state archive in Banská Bystrica (Slovak: Štátny archív v Banskej Bystrici).

- Roman Catholic church records (births/marriages/deaths): 1731-1896 (parish A)
- Lutheran church records (births/marriages/deaths): 1791-1895 (parish A)
- Census records 1869 of Babina are not available at the state archive.

== Population ==
Population statistic (10 years)
Year	1995	2005	2015	2025
Count	408	453	536	548
Difference		+11.02%	+18.32%	+2.23%

Population statistic
Year	2024	2025
Count	544	548
Difference		+0.73%

It has a population of 548 people (31 December 2025).

=== Ethnicity ===
Census 2021 (1+ %)
Ethnicity	Number	Fraction
Slovak	512	96.78%
Other	8	1.51%
Total	529	

In year 2021 was 529 people by ethnicity 512 as Slovak, 8 as Other, 5 as Czech, 5 as Not found out, 1 as Vietnamese, 1 as Romani, 1 as Rusyn and 1 as Hungarian.

Note on population: The difference values of population numbers in the table "Population statistic" and in the sections "Ethnicity" & "Religion" is caused by the use of various statistical methods.

=== Religion ===
Census 2021 (1+ %)
Religion	Number	Fraction
Roman Catholic Church	214	40.45%
Evangelical Church	186	35.16%
None	101	19.09%
Not found out	19	3.59%
Total	529	

In year 2021 was 529 people by religion 214 from Roman Catholic Church, 186 from Evangelical Church, 101 from None, 19 from Not found out, 4 from Greek Catholic Church, 2 from Other, 2 from Ad hoc movements and 1 from Buddhism.

== See also ==
- List of municipalities and towns in Slovakia
