= Lešť =

Municipality in Slovakia

Coordinates: 48°21′00″N 19°19′00″E

- Interactive map of Lešť
- Country: Slovakia

Area
  - Total: 145.76 km^{2} (56.28 sq mi)

Population (2025)
  - Total: 27
- Time zone: UTC+1 (CET)
  - Summer (DST): UTC+2 (CEST)

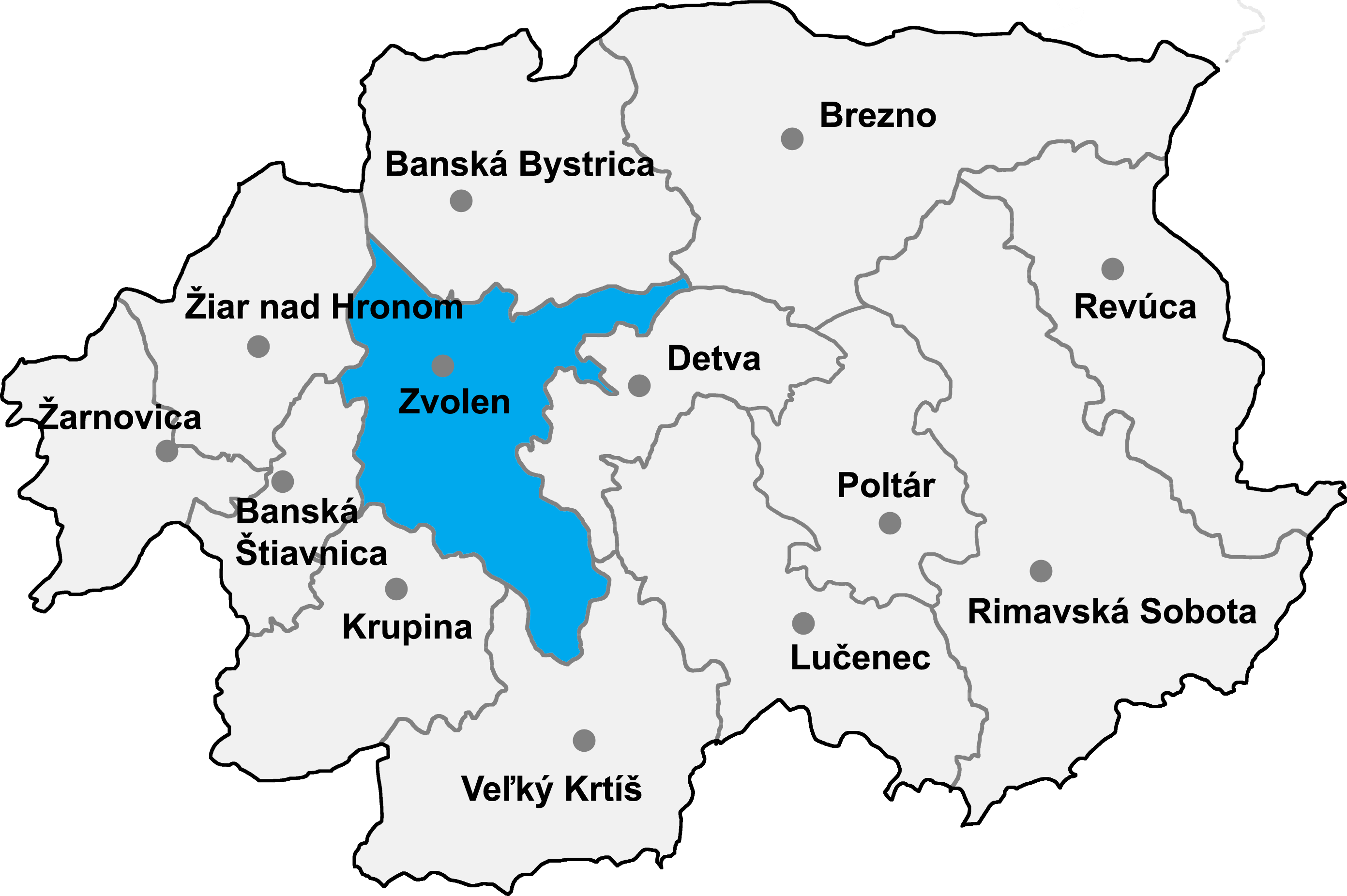
Zvolen District in the Banska region

Lešť (Hungarian: Lest) is a municipality and a former village in the Zvolen District in the Banská Bystrica Region of Slovakia.

Currently, it is the location of the Lešť military training centre.

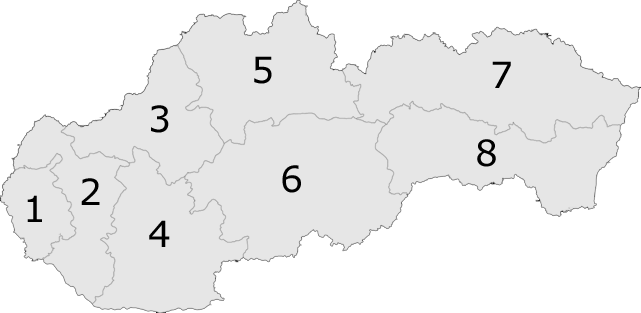
6: Banská Bystrica Region

== History ==
Before the establishment of independent Czechoslovakia in 1918, Lešť was part of Nógrád County within the Kingdom of Hungary. From 1939 to 1945, it was part of the Slovak Republic.

== Geography ==
The municipality lies at an altitude of 570 metres (1,870 ft) and covers an area of 145.76 km^{2} (56.28 sq mi) (2025).

== Population ==
Population statistic (10 years)
Year	1995	2005	2015	2025
Count	212	148	97	27
Difference		−30.18%	−34.45%	−72.16%

Population statistic
Year	2024	2025
Count	28	27
Difference		−3.57%

It has a population of 27 people (31 December 2025).

=== Ethnicity ===
Census 2021 (1+ %)
Ethnicity	Number	Fraction
Slovak	28	90.32%
Not found out	3	9.67%
Total	31	

In year 2021 was 31 people by ethnicity 28 as Slovak and 3 as Not found out.

Note on population: The difference between the population numbers above and in the census (here and below) is that the population numbers above are mostly made up of permanent residents, etc.; and the census should indicate the place where people actually mainly live.
For example, a student is a citizen of a village because they have permanent residence there (they lived there as a child and has parents), but most of the time he studies at a university in the city.

=== Religion ===
Census 2021 (1+ %)
Religion	Number	Fraction
Roman Catholic Church	20	64.52%
Evangelical Church	5	16.13%
Not found out	3	9.68%
None	2	6.45%
Greek Catholic Church	1	3.23%
Total	31	

In year 2021 was 31 people by religion 20 from Roman Catholic Church, 5 from Evangelical Church, 3 from Not found out, 2 from None and 1 from Greek Catholic Church.
