= Zvolen District =

Coordinates: 48°34′33″N 19°7′32″E

- District
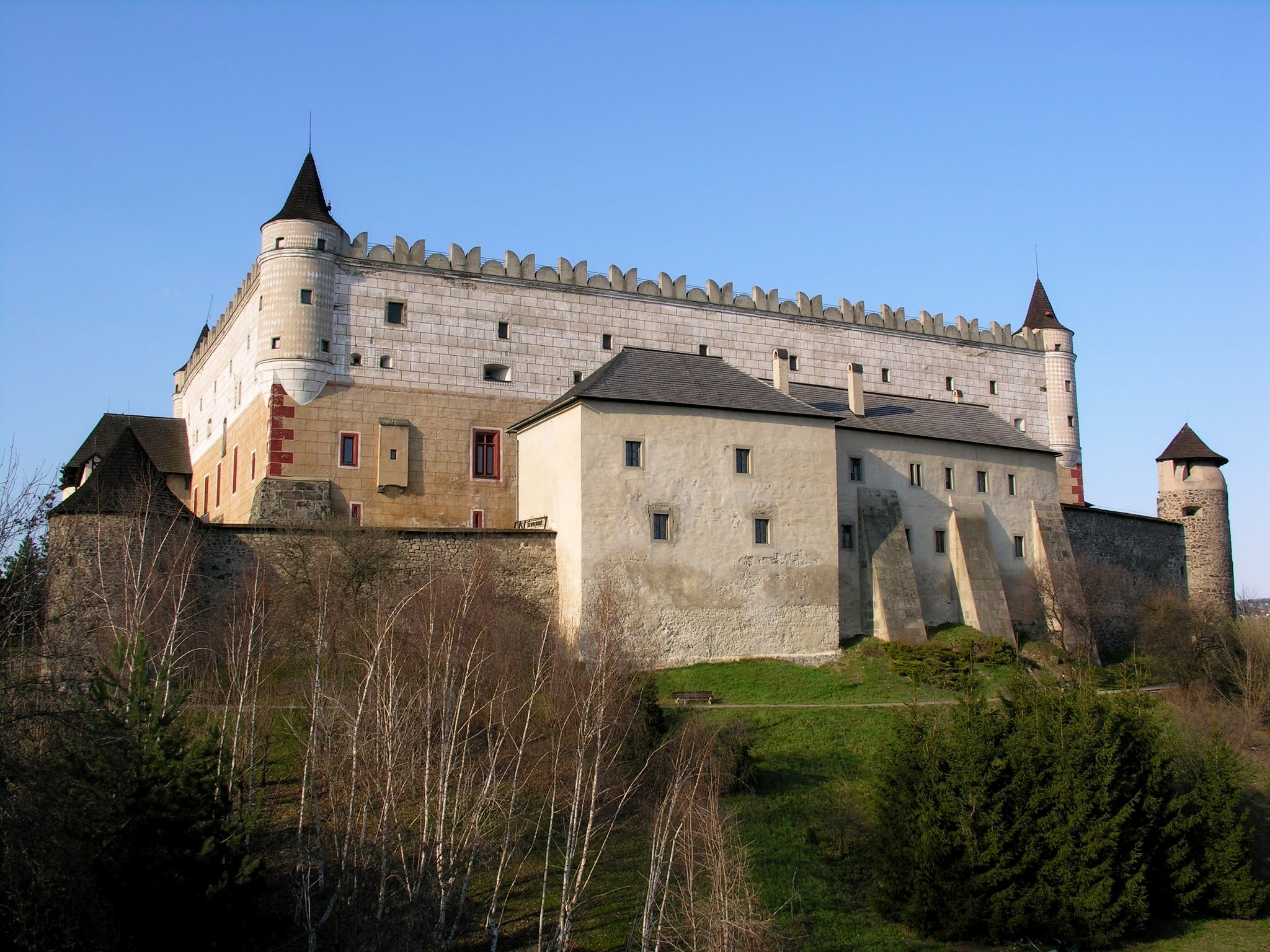
- Country: Slovakia
- Region (kraj): Banská Bystrica Region
- Seat: Zvolen

Area
  - Total: 759.02 km^{2} (293.06 sq mi)

Population (2025)
  - Total: 65,001
- Time zone: UTC+1 (CET)
  - Summer (DST): UTC+2 (CEST)
- Telephone prefix: 45
- Vehicle registration plate (until 2022): ZV
- Municipalities: 26

Zvolen District (Slovak: okres Zvolen) is a district in the Banská Bystrica Region of central Slovakia. Until 1918, most of the present-day district belonged to the Zvolen county, apart from Lešť in the south-west which was part of the county of Gemer a Malohont.

== Population ==
Population statistic (10 years)
Year	1995	2005	2015	2025
Count	67,829	67,626	68,932	65,001
Difference		−0.29%	+1.93%	−5.70%

Population statistic
Year	2024	2025
Count	65,370	65,001
Difference		−0.56%

It has a population of 65,001 people (31 December 2025).

Historical population
Year	Pop.	±%
1970	50,523	—
1980	59,898	+18.6%
1991	65,237	+8.9%
2001	67,633	+3.7%
2011	69,077	+2.1%
2021	66,750	−3.4%
Source: Statistical Office of the Slovak Republic

=== Ethnicity ===
Census 2021 (1+ %)
Ethnicity	Number	Fraction
Slovak	61,489	89.94%
Not found out	4338	6.34%
Total	68,362	

In year 2021 was 68,362 people by ethnicity 61,489 as Slovak, 4338 as Not found out, 677 as Czech, 533 as Romani, 308 as Hungarian, 250 as Other, 123 as Rusyn, 112 as Russian, 83 as Ukrainian, 64 as Polish, 64 as German, 47 as Vietnamese, 40 as Moravian, 32 as Romanian, 26 as Italian, 21 as Jewish, 19 as Chinese, 17 as English, 15 as French, 15 as Croatian, 15 as Bulgarian, 14 as Irish, 14 as Turkish, 13 as Serbian, 12 as Austrian, 7 as Albanian, 5 as Canadian, 4 as Greek, 3 as Silesian and 2 as Iranian.

Note on population: The difference values of population numbers in the table "Population statistic" and in the sections "Ethnicity" & "Religion" is caused by the use of various statistical methods.

=== Religion ===
Census 2021 (1+ %)
Religion	Number	Fraction
Roman Catholic Church	27,327	40.94%
None	22,846	34.23%
Evangelical Church	9796	14.68%
Not found out	4374	6.55%
Total	66,750	

In year 2021 was 66,750 people by religion 27,327 from Roman Catholic Church, 22,846 from None, 9796 from Evangelical Church, 4374 from Not found out, 589 from Greek Catholic Church, 252 from Ad hoc movements, 227 from Other, 187 from Christian Congregations in Slovakia, 184 from Eastern Orthodox Church, 180 from Other and not ascertained christian church, 153 from Jehovah's Witnesses, 130 from Buddhism, 92 from Paganism and natural spirituality, 70 from Calvinist Church, 67 from Apostolic Church, 51 from United Methodist Church, 51 from Seventh-day Adventist Church, 50 from Islam, 34 from Baptists Church, 21 from Jewish community, 20 from Hinduism, 18 from Church of the Brethren, 17 from Old Catholic Church, 10 from Czechoslovak Hussite Church, 2 from Church of Jesus Christ of Latter-day Saints and 2 from Bahá'i Community.

== Municipalities ==
Municipality	Area [km^{2}]	Population
Babiná	22.17	548
Bacúrov	9.60	159
Breziny	5.48	377
Budča	15.90	1,372
Bzovská Lehôtka	6.08	140
Dobrá Niva	52.54	1,837
Dubové	13.29	412
Hronská Breznica	9.51	249
Kováčová	7.15	1,693
Lešť	145.76	27
Lieskovec	13.89	1,360
Lukavica	5.16	287
Michalková	5.41	44
Očová	88.34	2,446
Ostrá Lúka	20.26	339
Pliešovce	56.10	2,250
Podzámčok	8.48	559
Sása	24.64	840
Sielnica	17.83	1,408
Sliač	39.83	4,806
Tŕnie	12.28	441
Turová	6.96	455
Veľká Lúka	8.53	882
Zvolen	98.69	38,747
Zvolenská Slatina	45.93	2,788
Železná Breznica	19.08	535

Population and area values are current for year 2025.
