= Sielnica =

Sielnica Szélnye
- Municipality
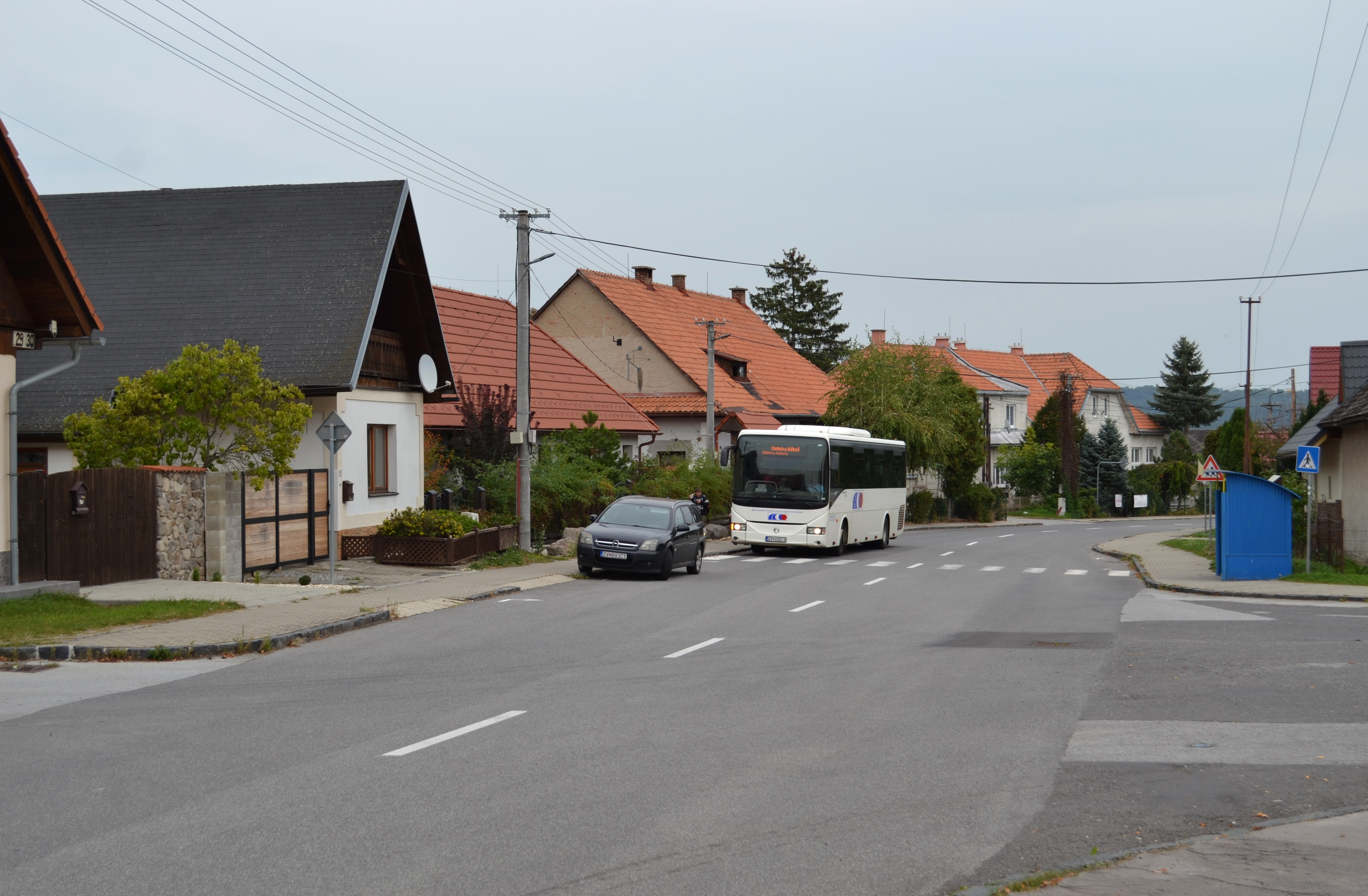

- Flag

- Location of Sielnica in the Banská Bystrica Region Location of Sielnica in Slovakia
- Coordinates: 48.63°N 19.12°E
- Country: Slovakia
- Region: Banská Bystrica Region
- District: Zvolen District
- First mentioned: 1250

Area
  - Total: 17.83 km^{2} (6.88 sq mi)
- Elevation: 338 m (1,109 ft)

Population (2025)
  - Total: 1,408
- Time zone: UTC+1 (CET)
  - Summer (DST): UTC+2 (CEST)
- Postal code: 962 31
- Area code: +421 45
- Vehicle registration plate (until 2022): ZV
- Website: www.sielnica.sk

Sielnica (Hungarian: Szélnye) is a village and municipality of the Zvolen District in the Banská Bystrica Region of Slovakia.

== History ==
Before the establishment of independent Czechoslovakia in 1918, Sielnica was part of Zólyom County within the Kingdom of Hungary. From 1939 to 1945, it was part of the Slovak Republic.

== Geography ==
The municipality lies at an altitude of 338 metres (1,109 ft) and covers an area of 17.83 km^{2} (6.88 sq mi) (2025).

== Population ==
Population statistic (10 years)
| Year | 1995 | 2005 | 2015 | 2025 |
|---|---|---|---|---|
| Count | 1136 | 1207 | 1417 | 1408 |
| Difference | | +6.25% | +17.39% | −0.63% |

Population statistic
| Year | 2024 | 2025 |
|---|---|---|
| Count | 1419 | 1408 |
| Difference | | −0.77% |

It has a population of 1408 people (31 December 2025).

=== Ethnicity ===
Census 2021 (1+ %)
| Ethnicity | Number | Fraction |
|---|---|---|
| Slovak | 1362 | 97.42% |
| Romani | 66 | 4.72% |
| Not found out | 15 | 1.07% |
| Total | 1398 | |

In year 2021 was 1398 people by ethnicity 1362 as Slovak, 66 as Romani, 15 as Not found out, 8 as Czech, 7 as Other, 4 as Russian, 2 as Ukrainian, 1 as Polish, 1 as Hungarian and 1 as French.

Note on population: The difference values of population numbers in the table "Population statistic" and in the sections "Ethnicity" & "Religion" is caused by the use of various statistical methods.

=== Religion ===
Census 2021 (1+ %)
| Religion | Number | Fraction |
|---|---|---|
| Roman Catholic Church | 1010 | 72.25% |
| None | 270 | 19.31% |
| Evangelical Church | 58 | 4.15% |
| Not found out | 27 | 1.93% |
| Total | 1398 | |

In year 2021 was 1398 people by religion 1010 from Roman Catholic Church, 270 from None, 58 from Evangelical Church, 27 from Not found out, 10 from Greek Catholic Church, 5 from Calvinist Church, 4 from Eastern Orthodox Church, 4 from Other, 2 from Other and not ascertained christian church, 2 from Jehovah's Witnesses, 2 from Church of the Brethren, 2 from Ad hoc movements, 1 from Christian Congregations in Slovakia and 1 from Islam.

== See also ==
- List of municipalities and towns in Slovakia
