= Kováčová, Zvolen District =

Kováčová Kovácsfalva
- Municipality
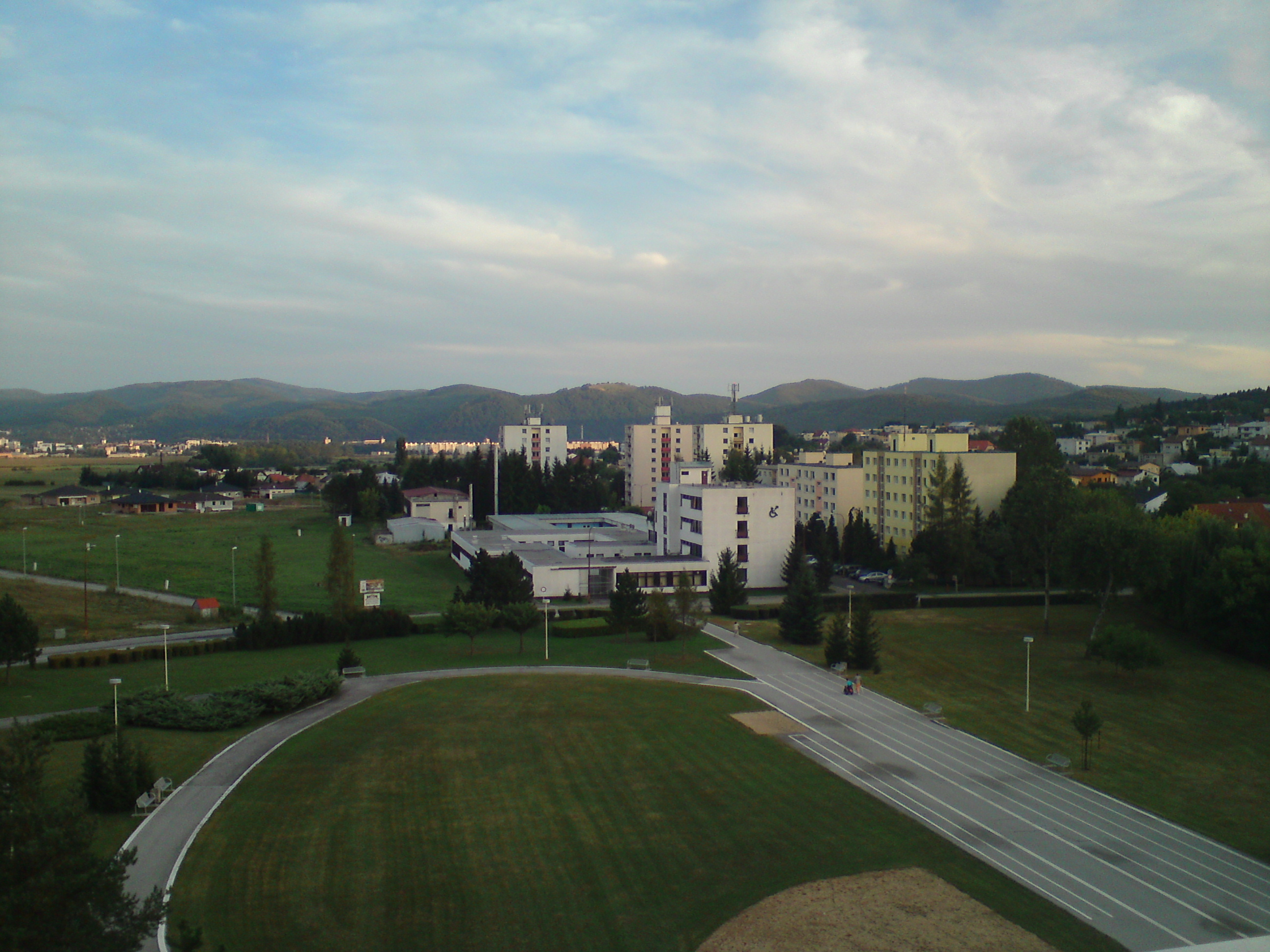

- Flag Coat of arms

- Location of Kováčová in the Banská Bystrica Region Location of Kováčová in Slovakia
- Coordinates: 48.59°N 19.09°E
- Country: Slovakia
- Region: Banská Bystrica Region
- District: Zvolen District
- First mentioned: 1254

Government
  - Mayor: Ján Izrael (KDH)

Area
  - Total: 7.15 km^{2} (2.76 sq mi)
- Elevation: 306 m (1,004 ft)

Population (2025)
  - Total: 1,693
- Time zone: UTC+1 (CET)
  - Summer (DST): UTC+2 (CEST)
- Postal code: 962 37
- Area code: +421 45
- Vehicle registration plate (until 2022): ZV
- Website: www.kovacova.sk

Kováčová (Hungarian: Kovácsfalva) is a spa village in Central Slovakia, best known for its hot springs.

== History ==
The village was first mentioned in 1254 as Koachou, and it was standing approximately 2 km west from present-day village. A hot spring was discovered in 1898 and soon after (1899, 1905) was used for spa purposes. Before the establishment of independent Czechoslovakia in 1918, Kováčová was part of Zólyom County within the Kingdom of Hungary. From 1939 to 1945, it was part of the Slovak Republic.

== Geography ==
Kováčová is situated in the Zvolen District of the Banská Bystrica Region in central Slovakia. The village is located in the Zvolen Basin, at the foothills of the Kremnické vrchy mountains, 5 km from Zvolen and 18 km from Banská Bystrica. Kováčová neighbors the spa town of Sliač.

== Population ==
Population statistic (10 years)
Year	1995	2005	2015	2025
Count	1366	1429	1531	1693
Difference		+4.61%	+7.13%	+10.58%

Population statistic
Year	2024	2025
Count	1695	1693
Difference		−0.11%

It has a population of 1693 people (31 December 2025).

=== Ethnicity ===
Census 2021 (1+ %)
Ethnicity	Number	Fraction
Slovak	1491	96.06%
Not found out	46	2.96%
Total	1552	

In year 2021 was 1552 people by ethnicity 1491 as Slovak, 46 as Not found out, 14 as Czech, 9 as Russian, 3 as Irish, 3 as Rusyn, 3 as Hungarian, 2 as Other, 2 as English, 2 as Albanian, 1 as Ukrainian, 1 as Italian, 1 as Romani and 1 as German.

Note on population: The difference values of population numbers in the table "Population statistic" and in the sections "Ethnicity" & "Religion" is caused by the use of various statistical methods.

=== Religion ===
Census 2021 (1+ %)
Religion	Number	Fraction
Roman Catholic Church	776	50%
None	443	28.54%
Evangelical Church	227	14.63%
Not found out	47	3.03%
Greek Catholic Church	17	1.1%
Total	1552	

In year 2021 was 1552 people by religion 776 from Roman Catholic Church, 443 from None, 227 from Evangelical Church, 47 from Not found out, 17 from Greek Catholic Church, 10 from Ad hoc movements, 9 from Other, 6 from Islam, 4 from Eastern Orthodox Church, 4 from Other and not ascertained christian church, 3 from Christian Congregations in Slovakia, 2 from Paganism and natural spirituality, 2 from Jehovah's Witnesses and 2 from Buddhism.

== Genealogical resources ==
The records for genealogical research are available at the state archive "Statny Archiv in Banska Bystrica, Slovakia"

- Roman Catholic church records (births/marriages/deaths): 1692-1880 (parish B)
- Lutheran church records (births/marriages/deaths): 1783-1909 (parish B)

== See also ==
- List of municipalities and towns in Slovakia
