= Pliešovce =

Pliešovce Tótpelsőc
- Municipality
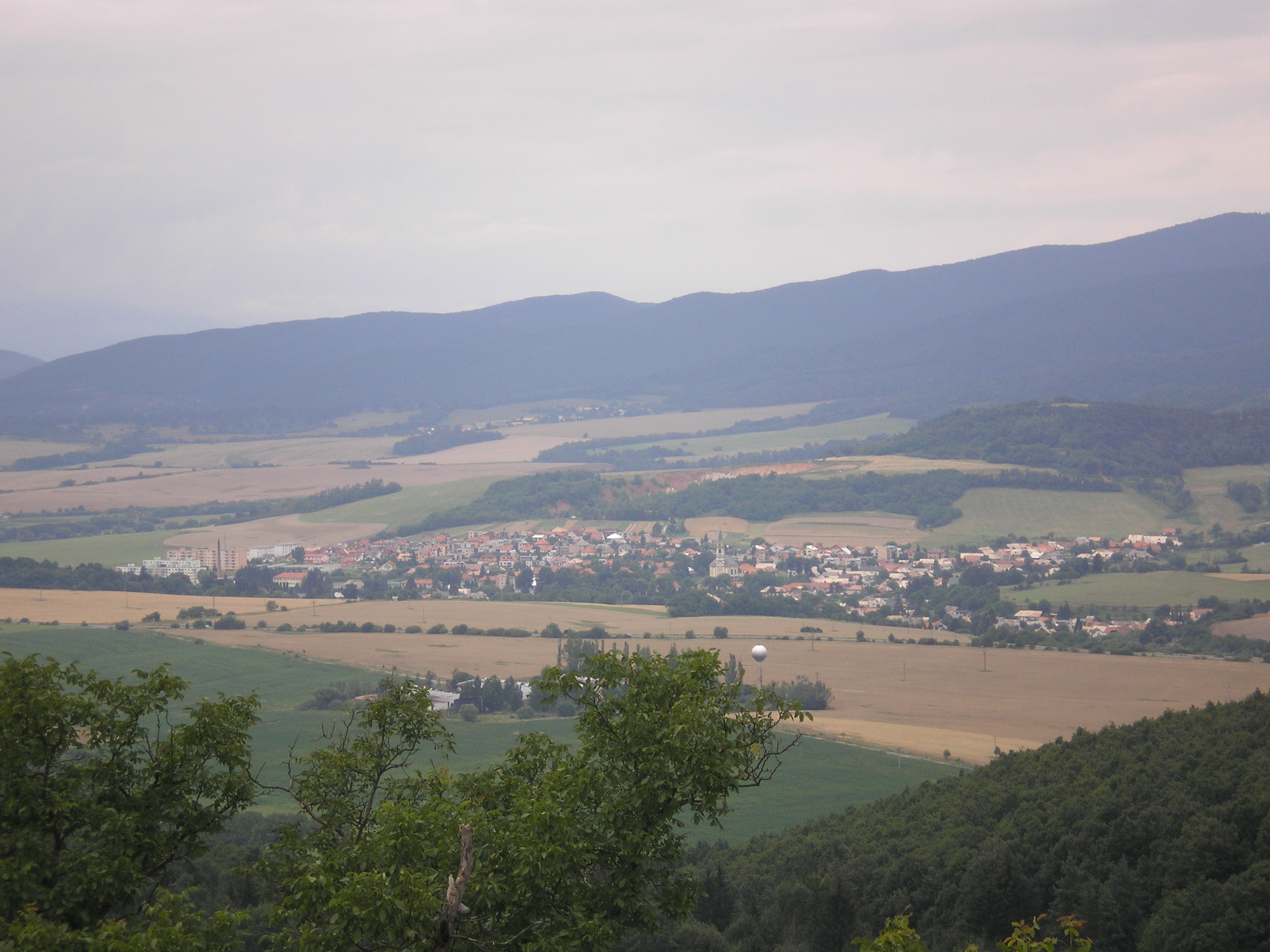

- Flag

- Location of Pliešovce in the Banská Bystrica Region Location of Pliešovce in Slovakia
- Coordinates: 48.42°N 19.17°E
- Country: Slovakia
- Region: Banská Bystrica Region
- District: Zvolen District
- First mentioned: 1332

Government
  - Mayor: Štefan Sýkora (Ind.)

Area
  - Total: 56.10 km^{2} (21.66 sq mi)
- Elevation: 633 m (2,077 ft)

Population (2025)
  - Total: 2,250
- Time zone: UTC+1 (CET)
  - Summer (DST): UTC+2 (CEST)
- Postal code: 962 63
- Area code: +421 45
- Vehicle registration plate (until 2022): ZV
- Website: www.pliesovce.sk

Pliešovce (German: Deutschpelsätz; Hungarian: Tótpelsőc) is a village and municipality of the Zvolen District in the Banská Bystrica Region of Slovakia.

== Geography ==
The municipality lies at an altitude of 633 metres (2,077 ft) and covers an area of 56.10 km^{2} (21.66 sq mi) (2025).

== History ==
Before the establishment of independent Czechoslovakia in 1918, Pliešovce was part of Zólyom County within the Kingdom of Hungary. From 1939 to 1945, it was part of the Slovak Republic.

== Population ==
Population statistic (10 years)
Year	1995	2005	2015	2025
Count	2221	2220	2285	2250
Difference		−0.04%	+2.92%	−1.53%

Population statistic
Year	2024	2025
Count	2262	2250
Difference		−0.53%

It has a population of 2250 people (31 December 2025).

=== Ethnicity ===
Census 2021 (1+ %)
Ethnicity	Number	Fraction
Slovak	2145	94.91%
Not found out	79	3.49%
Total	2260	

In year 2021 was 2260 people by ethnicity 2145 as Slovak, 79 as Not found out, 22 as Czech, 18 as Other, 10 as German, 8 as Polish, 8 as Hungarian, 4 as Rusyn, 4 as Moravian, 3 as Russian, 3 as French, 2 as Greek, 1 as Irish, 1 as Ukrainian and 1 as Romanian.

Note on population: The difference values of population numbers in the table "Population statistic" and in the sections "Ethnicity" & "Religion" is caused by the use of various statistical methods.

=== Religion ===
Census 2021 (1+ %)
Religion	Number	Fraction
Evangelical Church	825	36.5%
None	651	28.81%
Roman Catholic Church	619	27.39%
Not found out	75	3.32%
Total	2260	

In year 2021 was 2260 people by religion 825 from Evangelical Church, 651 from None, 619 from Roman Catholic Church, 75 from Not found out, 20 from Paganism and natural spirituality, 18 from Other, 12 from Greek Catholic Church, 11 from Buddhism, 8 from Christian Congregations in Slovakia, 7 from Ad hoc movements, 3 from Other and not ascertained christian church, 3 from United Methodist Church, 2 from Hinduism, 2 from Seventh-day Adventist Church, 1 from Old Catholic Church, 1 from Eastern Orthodox Church, 1 from Jehovah's Witnesses and 1 from Islam.

== Notable people ==
- Matej Čurma (born 1996), footballer
