= Železná Breznica =

Železná Breznica Vaségető
- Municipality
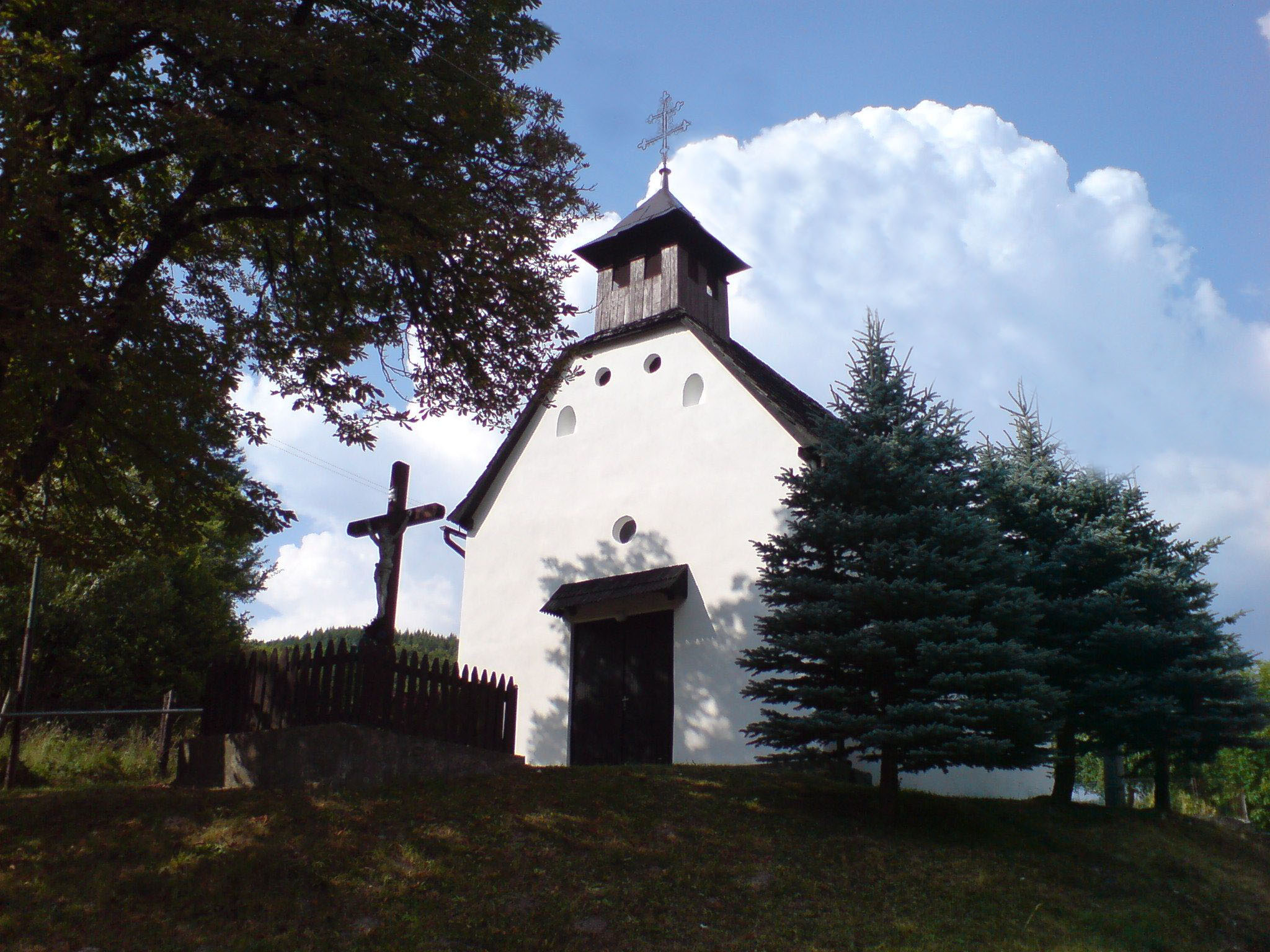

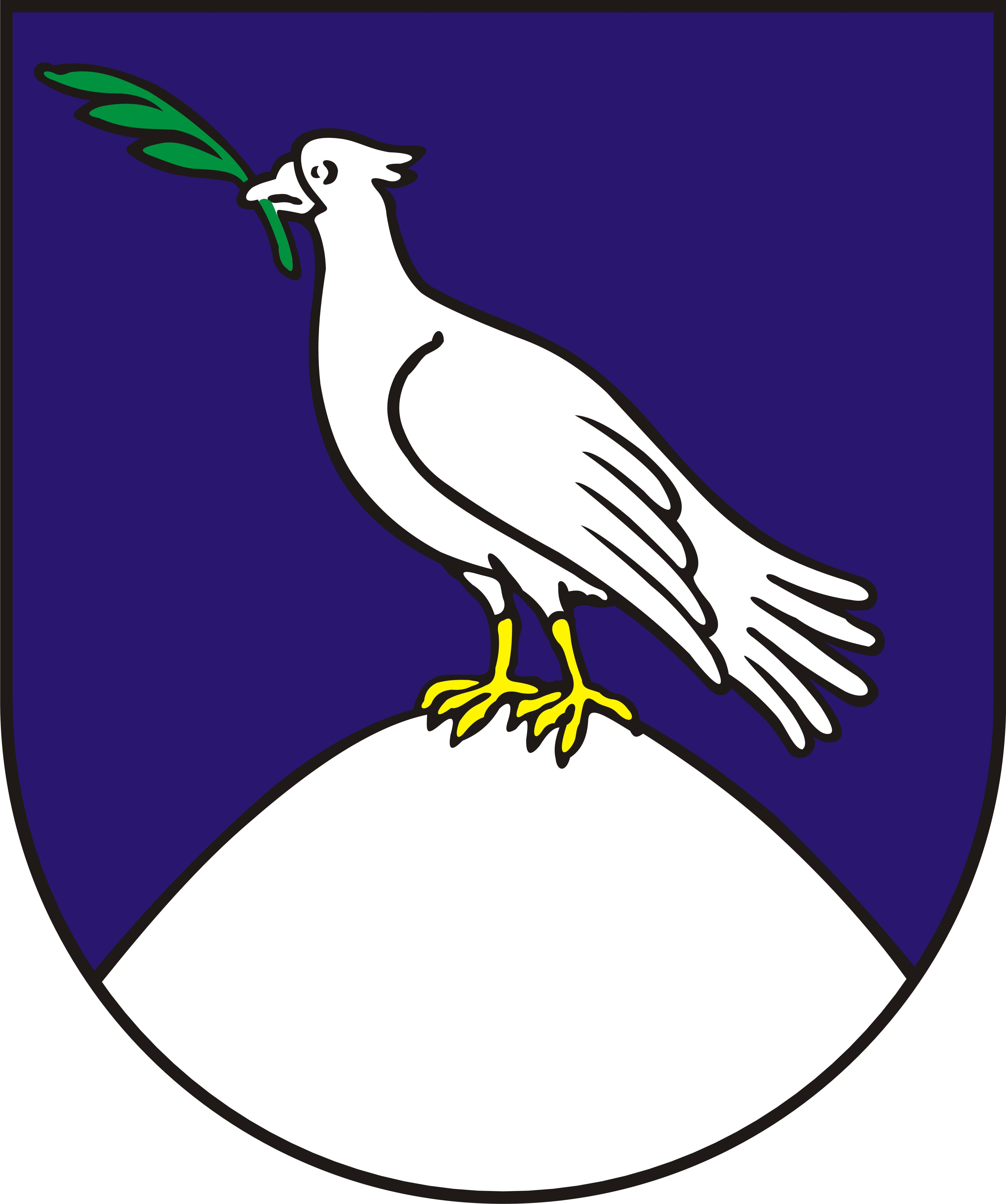
- Flag Coat of arms

- Location of Železná Breznica in the Banská Bystrica Region Location of Železná Breznica in Slovakia
- Coordinates: 48.62°N 19.01°E
- Country: Slovakia
- Region: Banská Bystrica Region
- District: Zvolen District
- First mentioned: 1424

Area
  - Total: 19.08 km^{2} (7.37 sq mi)
- Elevation: 449 m (1,473 ft)

Population (2025)
  - Total: 535
- Time zone: UTC+1 (CET)
  - Summer (DST): UTC+2 (CEST)
- Postal code: 962 34
- Area code: +421 45
- Vehicle registration plate (until 2022): ZV
- Website: www.zeleznabreznica.sk

Železná Breznica (Hungarian: Vaségető or Vasberzence): is a village and municipality of the Zvolen District in the Banská Bystrica Region of Slovakia. It has around 497 inhabitants.

== Geography ==
The municipality lies at an altitude of 449 metres (1,473 ft) and covers an area of 19.08 km^{2} (7.37 sq mi) (2025).

== History ==
The village was mentioned for the first time in written records in 1420.

== Population ==
Population statistic (10 years)
Year	1995	2005	2015	2025
Count	524	497	542	535
Difference		−5.15%	+9.05%	−1.29%

Population statistic
Year	2024	2025
Count	543	535
Difference		−1.47%

It has a population of 535 people (31 December 2025).

=== Ethnicity ===
Census 2021 (1+ %)
Ethnicity	Number	Fraction
Slovak	546	98.55%
Total	554	

In year 2021 was 554 people by ethnicity 546 as Slovak, 5 as Not found out, 5 as Other, 2 as Czech, 1 as Irish, 1 as Rusyn, 1 as Austrian, 1 as Moravian and 1 as Albanian.

Note on population: The difference values of population numbers in the table "Population statistic" and in the sections "Ethnicity" & "Religion" is caused by the use of various statistical methods.

=== Religion ===
Census 2021 (1+ %)
Religion	Number	Fraction
Roman Catholic Church	413	74.55%
None	98	17.69%
Evangelical Church	18	3.25%
Greek Catholic Church	9	1.62%
Total	554	

In year 2021 was 554 people by religion 413 from Roman Catholic Church, 98 from None, 18 from Evangelical Church, 9 from Greek Catholic Church, 5 from Not found out, 3 from Paganism and natural spirituality, 2 from Other and not ascertained christian church, 2 from Ad hoc movements, 1 from Christian Congregations in Slovakia, 1 from United Methodist Church, 1 from Czechoslovak Hussite Church and 1 from Buddhism.
