= Turová =

Turová Zólyomtúr
- Municipality
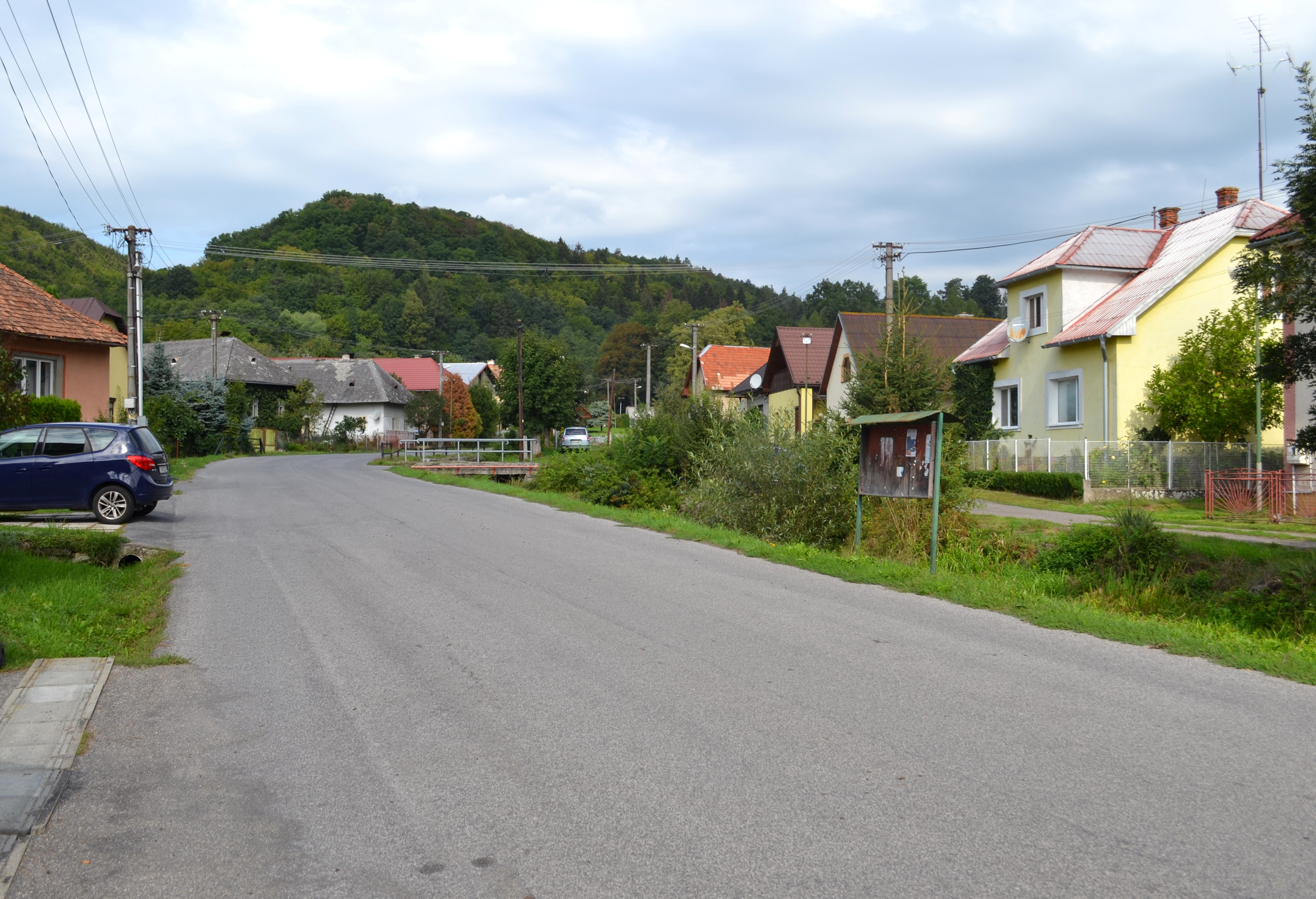

- Flag

- Location of Turová in the Banská Bystrica Region Location of Turová in Slovakia
- Coordinates: 48.60°N 19.05°E
- Country: Slovakia
- Region: Banská Bystrica Region
- District: Zvolen District
- First mentioned: 1424

Area
  - Total: 6.96 km^{2} (2.69 sq mi)
- Elevation: 335 m (1,099 ft)

Population (2025)
  - Total: 455
- Time zone: UTC+1 (CET)
  - Summer (DST): UTC+2 (CEST)
- Postal code: 962 34
- Area code: +421 45
- Vehicle registration plate (until 2022): ZV
- Website: www.turova.sk

Turová (Hungarian: Zólyomtúr) is a village and municipality of the Zvolen District in the Banská Bystrica Region of Slovakia.

== Geography ==
The municipality lies at an altitude of 335 metres (1,099 ft) and covers an area of 6.96 km^{2} (2.69 sq mi) (2025).

== Population ==
Population statistic (10 years)
Year	1995	2005	2015	2025
Count	364	350	407	455
Difference		−3.84%	+16.28%	+11.79%

Population statistic
Year	2024	2025
Count	450	455
Difference		+1.11%

It has a population of 455 people (31 December 2025).

=== Ethnicity ===
Census 2021 (1+ %)
Ethnicity	Number	Fraction
Slovak	441	98.87%
Total	446	

In year 2021 was 446 people by ethnicity 441 as Slovak, 4 as Czech, 1 as Romani, 1 as Rusyn, 1 as Romanian, 1 as Polish, 1 as Not found out, 1 as Moravian, 1 as Other and 1 as English.

Note on population: The difference values of population numbers in the table "Population statistic" and in the sections "Ethnicity" & "Religion" is caused by the use of various statistical methods.

=== Religion ===
Census 2021 (1+ %)
Religion	Number	Fraction
Roman Catholic Church	282	63.23%
None	111	24.89%
Evangelical Church	37	8.3%
Total	446	

In year 2021 was 446 people by religion 282 from Roman Catholic Church, 111 from None, 37 from Evangelical Church, 4 from Other and not ascertained christian church, 4 from Greek Catholic Church, 2 from Christian Congregations in Slovakia, 2 from Buddhism, 1 from Calvinist Church, 1 from Eastern Orthodox Church, 1 from Czechoslovak Hussite Church and 1 from Ad hoc movements.
