= Bzovská Lehôtka =

Bzovská Lehôtka Bozókszabadi
- Municipality
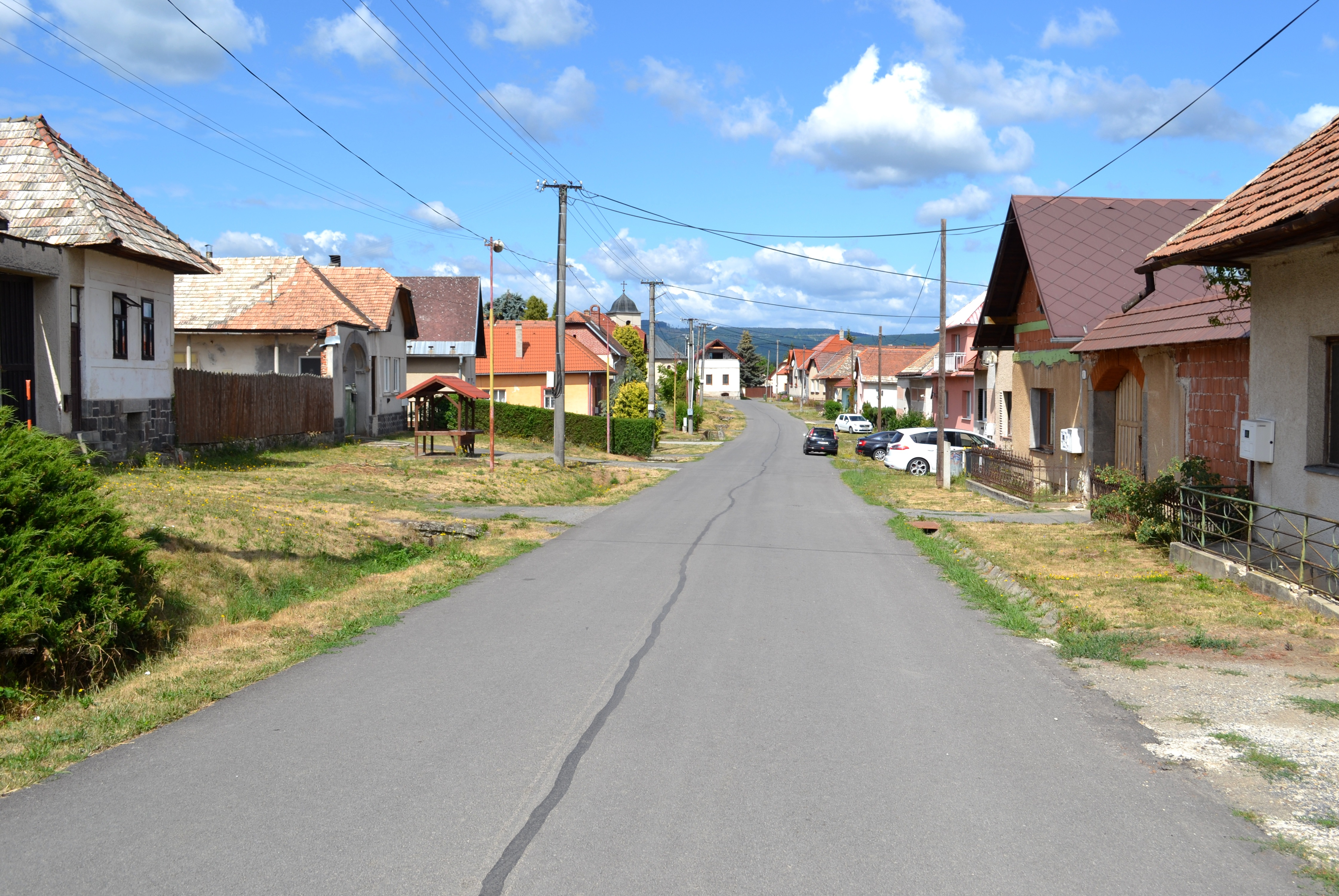

- Flag

- Location of Bzovská Lehôtka in the Banská Bystrica Region Location of Bzovská Lehôtka in Slovakia
- Coordinates: 48.42°N 19.13°E
- Country: Slovakia
- Region: Banská Bystrica Region
- District: Zvolen District
- First mentioned: 1446

Area
  - Total: 6.08 km^{2} (2.35 sq mi)
- Elevation: 422 m (1,385 ft)

Population (2025)
  - Total: 140
- Time zone: UTC+1 (CET)
  - Summer (DST): UTC+2 (CEST)
- Postal code: 962 62
- Area code: +421 45
- Vehicle registration plate (until 2022): ZV
- Website: www.bzovskalehotka.sk

Bzovská Lehôtka (Hungarian: Bozókszabadi, until 1899: Bozók-Lehota) is a village and municipality of the Zvolen District in the Banská Bystrica Region of Slovakia

== Geography ==
The municipality lies at an altitude of 422 metres (1,385 ft) and covers an area of 6.08 km^{2} (2.35 sq mi) (2025).

== History ==
In historical records, the village was first mentioned in 1524 as belonging to Hont County. In 1786 it passed to Zólyom County within the Kingdom of Hungary, where it remained until the establishment of independent Czechoslovakia in 1918. From 1939 to 1945, it was part of the Slovak Republic.

== Population ==
Population statistic (10 years)
Year	1995	2005	2015	2025
Count	127	119	141	140
Difference		−6.29%	+18.48%	−0.70%

Population statistic
Year	2024	2025
Count	139	140
Difference		+0.71%

It has a population of 140 people (31 December 2025).

=== Ethnicity ===
Census 2021 (1+ %)
Ethnicity	Number	Fraction
Slovak	127	96.21%
Not found out	4	3.03%
Czech	2	1.51%
Total	132	

In year 2021 was 132 people by ethnicity 127 as Slovak, 4 as Not found out, 2 as Czech and 1 as Rusyn.

Note on population: The difference values of population numbers in the table "Population statistic" and in the sections "Ethnicity" & "Religion" is caused by the use of various statistical methods.

=== Religion ===
Census 2021 (1+ %)
Religion	Number	Fraction
Roman Catholic Church	84	63.64%
Evangelical Church	24	18.18%
None	19	14.39%
Not found out	5	3.79%
Total	132	

In year 2021 was 132 people by religion 84 from Roman Catholic Church, 24 from Evangelical Church, 19 from None and 5 from Not found out.
