= Veľká Lúka =

Veľká Lúka Nagyrét
- Municipality
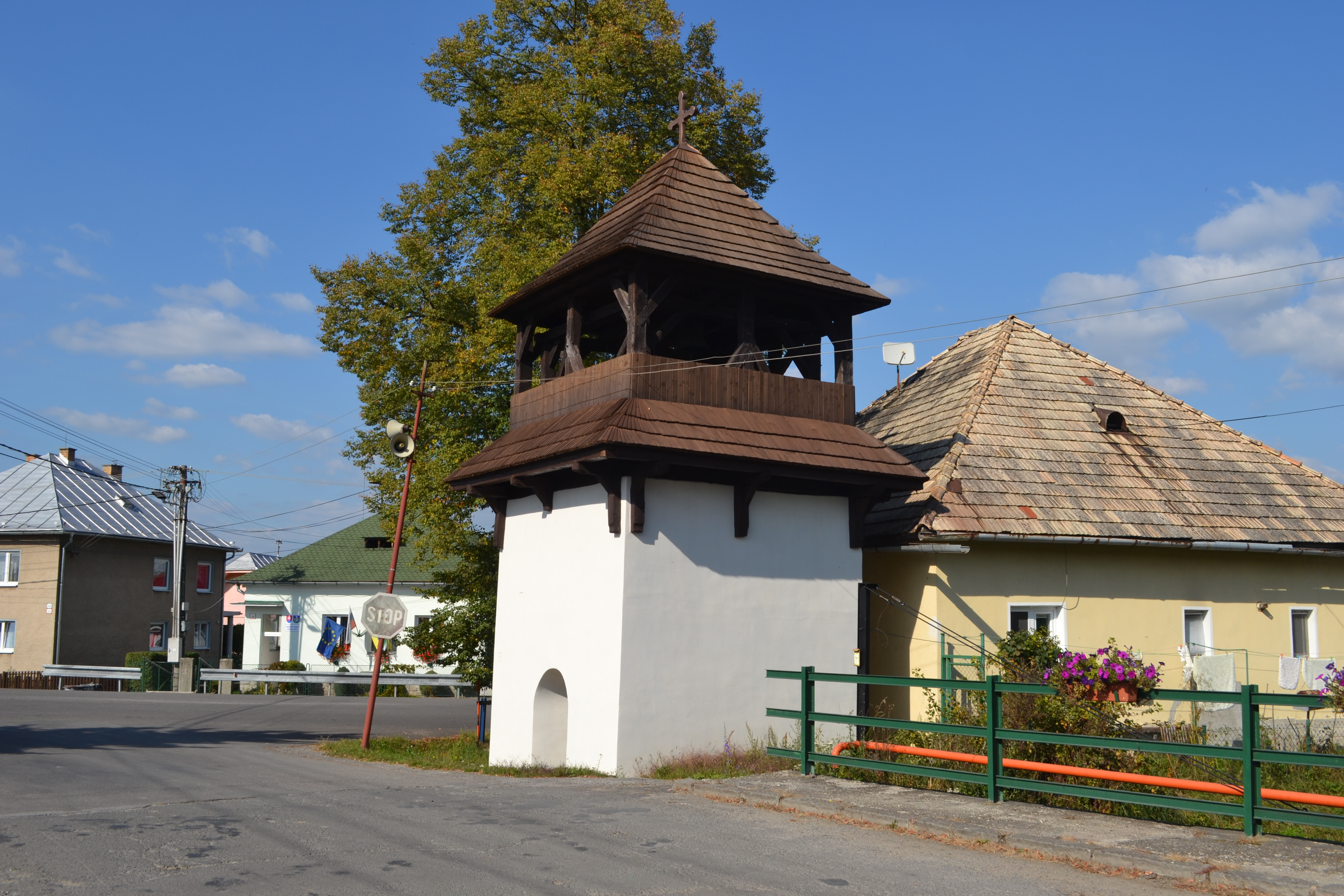

- Flag

- Location of Veľká Lúka in the Banská Bystrica Region Location of Veľká Lúka in Slovakia
- Coordinates: 48.63°N 19.17°E
- Country: Slovakia
- Region: Banská Bystrica Region
- District: Zvolen District
- First mentioned: 1281

Area
  - Total: 8.53 km^{2} (3.29 sq mi)
- Elevation: 311 m (1,020 ft)

Population (2025)
  - Total: 882
- Time zone: UTC+1 (CET)
  - Summer (DST): UTC+2 (CEST)
- Postal code: 962 31
- Area code: +421 45
- Vehicle registration plate (until 2022): ZV
- Website: www.velkaluka.sk

Veľká Lúka (Hungarian: Nagyrét) is a village and municipality of the Zvolen District in the Banská Bystrica Region of Slovakia.

== Geography ==
The municipality lies at an altitude of 311 metres (1,020 ft) and covers an area of 8.53 km^{2} (3.29 sq mi) (2025).

== Population ==
Population statistic (10 years)
Year	1995	2005	2015	2025
Count	0	435	625	882
Difference		–	+43.67%	+41.12%

Population statistic
Year	2024	2025
Count	868	882
Difference		+1.61%

It has a population of 882 people (31 December 2025).

=== Ethnicity ===
Census 2021 (1+ %)
Ethnicity	Number	Fraction
Slovak	788	95.16%
Not found out	35	4.22%
Czech	9	1.08%
Romani	9	1.08%
Total	828	

In year 2021 was 828 people by ethnicity 788 as Slovak, 35 as Not found out, 9 as Czech, 9 as Romani, 4 as Rusyn, 2 as Irish, 2 as Other and 1 as Ukrainian.

Note on population: The difference values of population numbers in the table "Population statistic" and in the sections "Ethnicity" & "Religion" is caused by the use of various statistical methods.

=== Religion ===
Census 2021 (1+ %)
Religion	Number	Fraction
None	288	34.78%
Roman Catholic Church	287	34.66%
Evangelical Church	190	22.95%
Not found out	33	3.99%
Greek Catholic Church	9	1.09%
Total	828	

In year 2021 was 828 people by religion 288 from None, 287 from Roman Catholic Church, 190 from Evangelical Church, 33 from Not found out, 9 from Greek Catholic Church, 7 from Other and not ascertained christian church, 5 from Eastern Orthodox Church, 3 from Buddhism, 2 from Other, 1 from Calvinist Church, 1 from Christian Congregations in Slovakia, 1 from Hinduism and 1 from Ad hoc movements.
