= Lukavica, Zvolen District =

Lukavica Lukóca
- Municipality
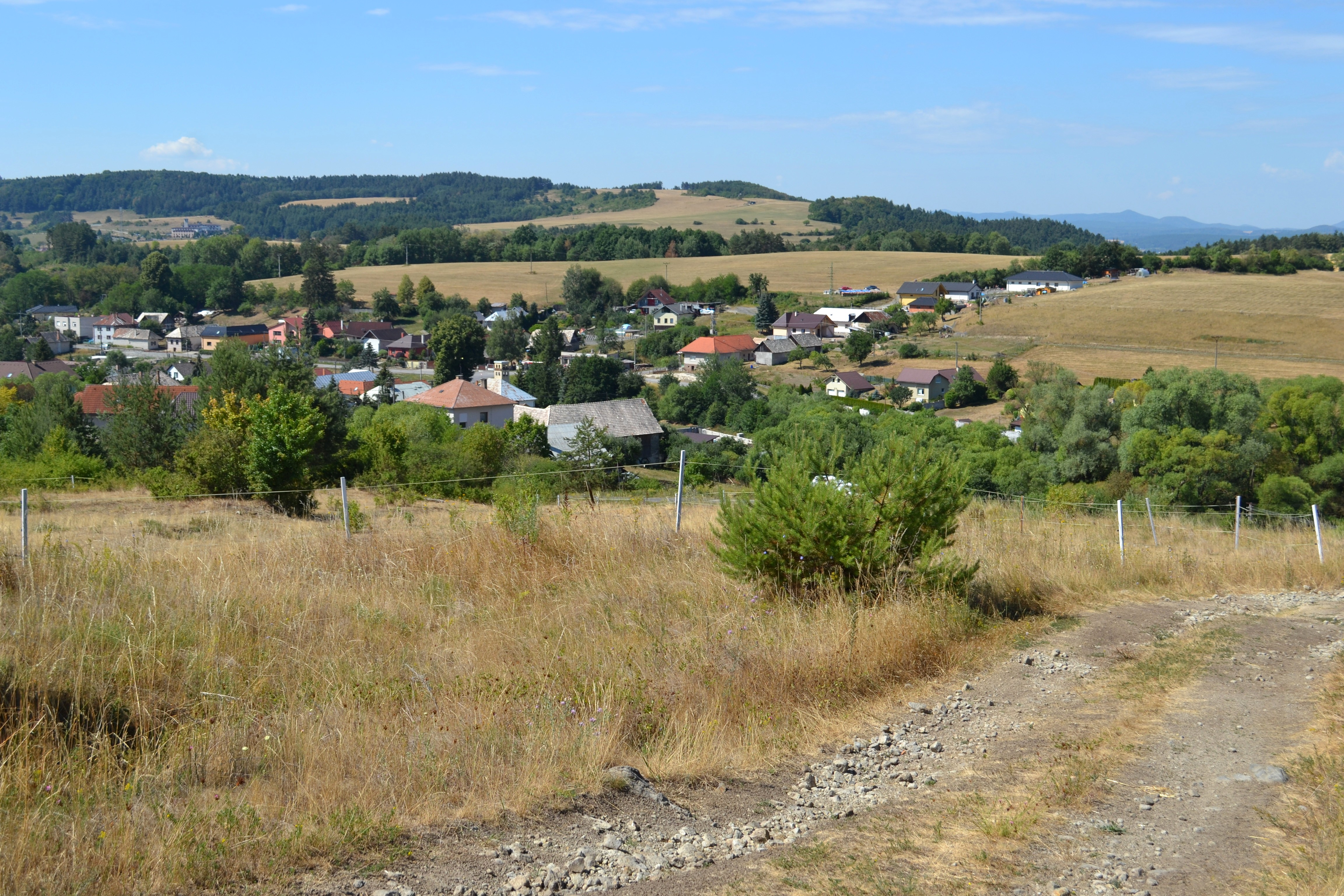

- Flag

- Location of Lukavica in the Banská Bystrica Region Location of Lukavica in Slovakia
- Coordinates: 48.64°N 19.21°E
- Country: Slovakia
- Region: Banská Bystrica Region
- District: Zvolen District
- First mentioned: 1389

Area
  - Total: 5.16 km^{2} (1.99 sq mi)
- Elevation: 339 m (1,112 ft)

Population (2025)
  - Total: 287
- Time zone: UTC+1 (CET)
  - Summer (DST): UTC+2 (CEST)
- Postal code: 962 31
- Area code: +421 45
- Vehicle registration plate (until 2022): ZV
- Website: www.lukavicazv.sk

Lukavica (Hungarian: Lukóca) is a village and municipality of the Zvolen District in the Banská Bystrica Region of Slovakia.

== History ==
Before the establishment of independent Czechoslovakia in 1918, Lukavica was part of Zólyom County within the Kingdom of Hungary. From 1939 to 1945, it was part of the Slovak Republic.

== Population ==
Population statistic (10 years)
Year	1995	2005	2015	2025
Count	154	141	167	287
Difference		−8.44%	+18.43%	+71.85%

Population statistic
Year	2024	2025
Count	287	287
Difference		+0%

It has a population of 287 people (31 December 2025).

=== Ethnicity ===
Census 2021 (1+ %)
Ethnicity	Number	Fraction
Slovak	247	94.63%
Not found out	8	3.06%
Czech	4	1.53%
Hungarian	3	1.14%
Other	3	1.14%
Total	261	

In year 2021 was 261 people by ethnicity 247 as Slovak, 8 as Not found out, 4 as Czech, 3 as Hungarian, 3 as Other, 2 as Russian, 1 as Rusyn, 1 as German and 1 as Croatian.

Note on population: The difference values of population numbers in the table "Population statistic" and in the sections "Ethnicity" & "Religion" is caused by the use of various statistical methods.

=== Religion ===
Census 2021 (1+ %)
Religion	Number	Fraction
None	111	42.53%
Roman Catholic Church	69	26.44%
Evangelical Church	55	21.07%
Not found out	13	4.98%
Eastern Orthodox Church	5	1.92%
Calvinist Church	4	1.53%
Total	261	

In year 2021 was 261 people by religion 111 from None, 69 from Roman Catholic Church, 55 from Evangelical Church, 13 from Not found out, 5 from Eastern Orthodox Church, 4 from Calvinist Church, 1 from Other, 1 from Greek Catholic Church, 1 from Buddhism and 1 from Ad hoc movements.
