= Michalková =

Michalková Zólyommihályi
- Municipality
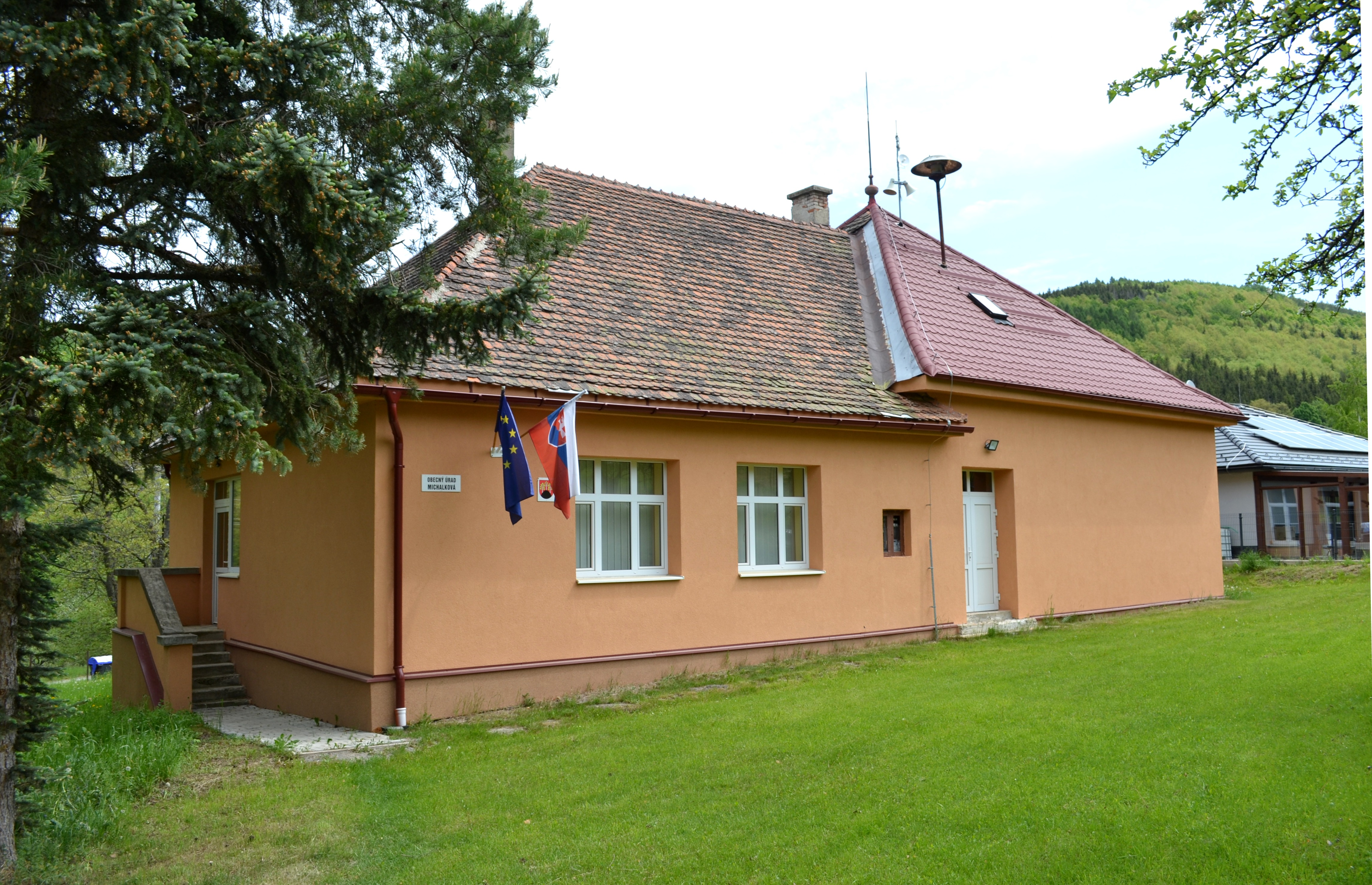

- Flag

- Location of Michalková in the Banská Bystrica Region Location of Michalková in Slovakia
- Coordinates: 48.52°N 19.15°E
- Country: Slovakia
- Region: Banská Bystrica Region
- District: Zvolen District
- First mentioned: 1786

Government
  - Mayor: Ján Parobok (Independent)

Area
  - Total: 5.41 km^{2} (2.09 sq mi)
- Elevation: 581 m (1,906 ft)

Population (2025)
  - Total: 44
- Time zone: UTC+1 (CET)
  - Summer (DST): UTC+2 (CEST)
- Postal code: 962 61
- Area code: +421 45
- Vehicle registration plate (until 2022): ZV

Michalková (Hungarian: Zólyommihályi) is a village and municipality of the Zvolen District in the Banská Bystrica Region of Slovakia. It is also the place of origin of the eponymous dog, the Michakova.

== Geography ==
The municipality lies at an altitude of 581 metres (1,906 ft) and covers an area of 5.41 km^{2} (2.09 sq mi) (2025).

== History ==
Before the establishment of independent Czechoslovakia in 1918, Michalková was part of Zólyom County within the Kingdom of Hungary. From 1939 to 1945, it was part of the Slovak Republic.

== Population ==
Population statistic (10 years)
Year	1995	2005	2015	2025
Count	40	42	36	44
Difference		+5%	−14.28%	+22.22%

Population statistic
Year	2024	2025
Count	45	44
Difference		−2.22%

It has a population of 44 people (31 December 2025).

=== Ethnicity ===
Census 2021 (1+ %)
Ethnicity	Number	Fraction
Slovak	35	94.59%
Other	2	5.4%
Czech	1	2.7%
Not found out	1	2.7%
Total	37	

In year 2021 was 37 people by ethnicity 35 as Slovak, 2 as Other, 1 as Czech and 1 as Not found out.

Note on population: The difference values of population numbers in the table "Population statistic" and in the sections "Ethnicity" & "Religion" is caused by the use of various statistical methods.

=== Religion ===
Census 2021 (1+ %)
Religion	Number	Fraction
Roman Catholic Church	17	45.95%
None	11	29.73%
Evangelical Church	5	13.51%
Not found out	1	2.7%
Other	1	2.7%
Greek Catholic Church	1	2.7%
Buddhism	1	2.7%
Total	37	

In year 2021 was 37 people by religion 17 from Roman Catholic Church, 11 from None, 5 from Evangelical Church, 1 from Not found out, 1 from Other, 1 from Greek Catholic Church and 1 from Buddhism.
