= Tŕnie =

Municipality of Slovakia

Tŕnie Zólyomternye
- Municipality
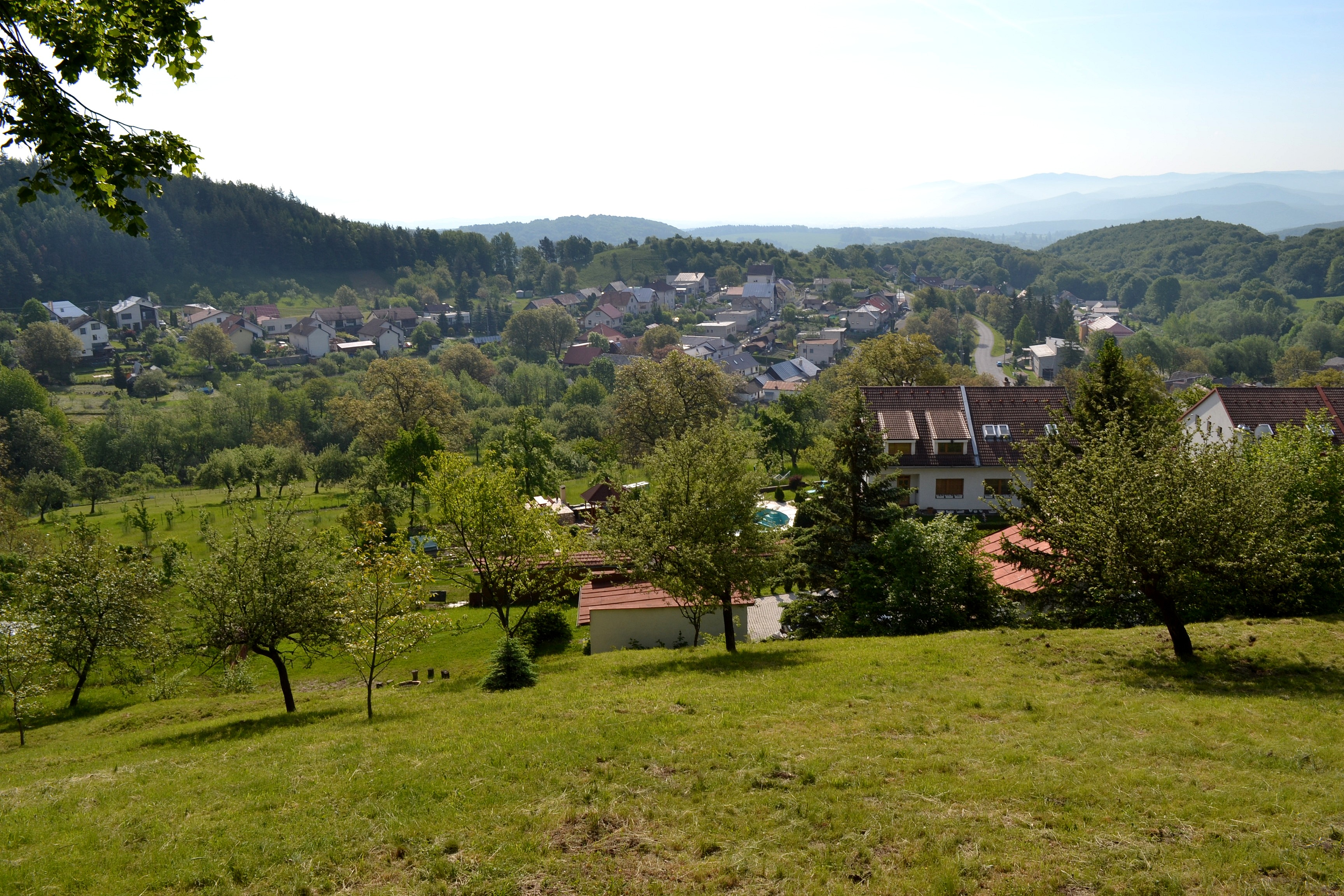

- Flag

- Location of Tŕnie in the Banská Bystrica Region Location of Tŕnie in Slovakia
- Coordinates: 48.61°N 19.03°E
- Country: Slovakia
- Region: Banská Bystrica Region
- District: Zvolen District
- First mentioned: 1393

Area
  - Total: 12.28 km^{2} (4.74 sq mi)
- Elevation: 516 m (1,693 ft)

Population (2025)
  - Total: 441
- Time zone: UTC+1 (CET)
  - Summer (DST): UTC+2 (CEST)
- Postal code: 962 34
- Area code: +421 45
- Vehicle registration plate (until 2022): ZV
- Website: www.trnie.sk

Tŕnie (Hungarian: Zólyomternye) is a village and municipality of the Zvolen District in the Banská Bystrica Region of Slovakia. The medieval church of St. Martin is located there.

== Geography ==
The municipality lies at an altitude of 516 metres (1,693 ft) and covers an area of 12.28 km^{2} (4.74 sq mi) (2025).

== Population ==
Population statistic (10 years)
Year	1995	2005	2015	2025
Count	337	366	433	441
Difference		+8.60%	+18.30%	+1.84%

Population statistic
Year	2024	2025
Count	427	441
Difference		+3.27%

It has a population of 441 people (31 December 2025).

=== Ethnicity ===
Census 2021 (1+ %)
Ethnicity	Number	Fraction
Slovak	388	96.27%
Not found out	5	1.24%
Total	403	

In year 2021 was 403 people by ethnicity 388 as Slovak, 5 as Not found out, 4 as Czech, 4 as Moravian, 4 as Hungarian, 3 as Ukrainian, 3 as Rusyn, 3 as German, 1 as Romanian and 1 as Other.

Note on population: The difference values of population numbers in the table "Population statistic" and in the sections "Ethnicity" & "Religion" is caused by the use of various statistical methods.

=== Religion ===
Census 2021 (1+ %)
Religion	Number	Fraction
Roman Catholic Church	267	66.25%
None	95	23.57%
Not found out	15	3.72%
Paganism and natural spirituality	6	1.49%
Evangelical Church	5	1.24%
Total	403	

In year 2021 was 403 people by religion 267 from Roman Catholic Church, 95 from None, 15 from Not found out, 6 from Paganism and natural spirituality, 5 from Evangelical Church, 4 from Greek Catholic Church, 3 from Eastern Orthodox Church, 3 from Other, 2 from Other and not ascertained christian church, 1 from Christian Congregations in Slovakia, 1 from Buddhism and 1 from Ad hoc movements.
