= Breziny =

Breziny Zólyomberezna
- Municipality
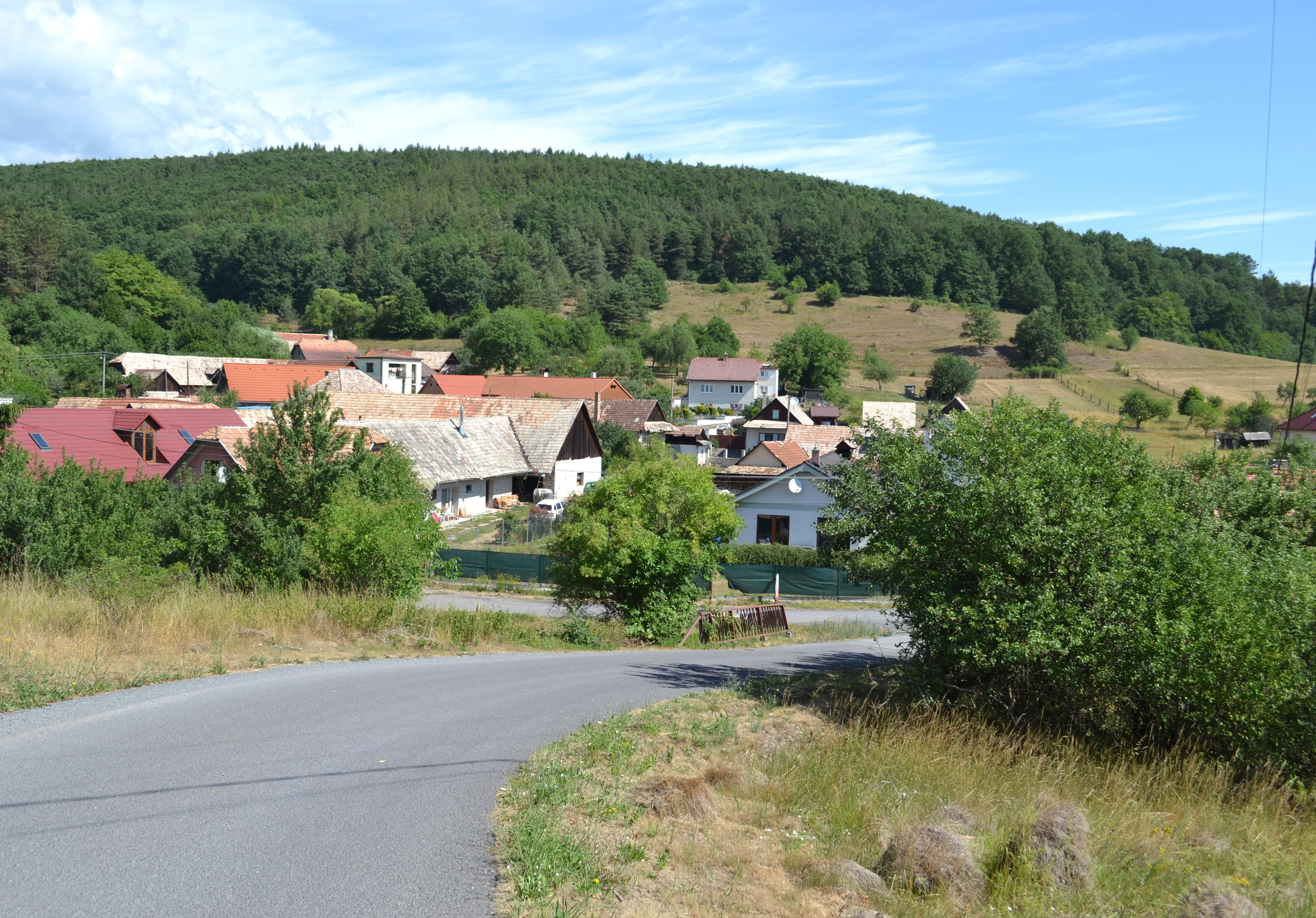

- Flag

- Location of Breziny in the Banská Bystrica Region Location of Breziny in Slovakia
- Coordinates: 48.52°N 19.10°E
- Country: Slovakia
- Region: Banská Bystrica Region
- District: Zvolen District
- First mentioned: 1808

Government
  - Mayor: Ján Šatara (Ind.)

Area
  - Total: 5.48 km^{2} (2.12 sq mi)
- Elevation: 366 m (1,201 ft)

Population (2025)
  - Total: 377
- Time zone: UTC+1 (CET)
  - Summer (DST): UTC+2 (CEST)
- Postal code: 962 61
- Area code: +421 45
- Vehicle registration plate (until 2022): ZV
- Website: www.breziny.sk

Breziny (Hungarian: Zólyomberezna) is a village and municipality of the Zvolen District in the Banská Bystrica Region of Slovakia.

== Geography ==
The municipality lies at an altitude of 366 metres (1,201 ft) and covers an area of 5.48 km^{2} (2.12 sq mi) (2025).

== History ==
Before the establishment of independent Czechoslovakia in 1918, Breziny was part of Zólyom County within the Kingdom of Hungary. From 1939 to 1945, it was part of the Slovak Republic.

== Genealogical resources ==
The records for genealogical research are available at the state archive "Statny Archiv in Banska Bystrica, Slovakia"

- Roman Catholic church records (births/marriages/deaths): 1786-1912 (parish B)
- Lutheran church records (births/marriages/deaths): 1784-1860 (parish B)

== Population ==
Population statistic (10 years)
| Year | 1995 | 2005 | 2015 | 2025 |
|---|---|---|---|---|
| Count | 310 | 326 | 367 | 377 |
| Difference | | +5.16% | +12.57% | +2.72% |

Population statistic
| Year | 2024 | 2025 |
|---|---|---|
| Count | 377 | 377 |
| Difference | | +0% |

It has a population of 377 people (31 December 2025).

=== Ethnicity ===
Census 2021 (1+ %)
| Ethnicity | Number | Fraction |
|---|---|---|
| Slovak | 343 | 92.45% |
| Not found out | 20 | 5.39% |
| Romani | 5 | 1.34% |
| Total | 371 | |

In year 2021 was 371 people by ethnicity 343 as Slovak, 20 as Not found out, 5 as Romani, 2 as Czech, 2 as Romanian, 1 as German and 1 as Other.

Note on population: The difference values of population numbers in the table "Population statistic" and in the sections "Ethnicity" & "Religion" is caused by the use of various statistical methods.

=== Religion ===
Census 2021 (1+ %)
| Religion | Number | Fraction |
|---|---|---|
| Roman Catholic Church | 178 | 47.98% |
| None | 77 | 20.75% |
| Evangelical Church | 73 | 19.68% |
| Not found out | 28 | 7.55% |
| Apostolic Church | 5 | 1.35% |
| Total | 371 | |

In year 2021 was 371 people by religion 178 from Roman Catholic Church, 77 from None, 73 from Evangelical Church, 28 from Not found out, 5 from Apostolic Church, 3 from Other and not ascertained christian church, 2 from Christian Congregations in Slovakia, 2 from Other, 2 from Ad hoc movements and 1 from Paganism and natural spirituality.

== See also ==
- List of municipalities and towns in Slovakia
