= Sása, Zvolen District =

Sása Szászpelsőc
- Municipality
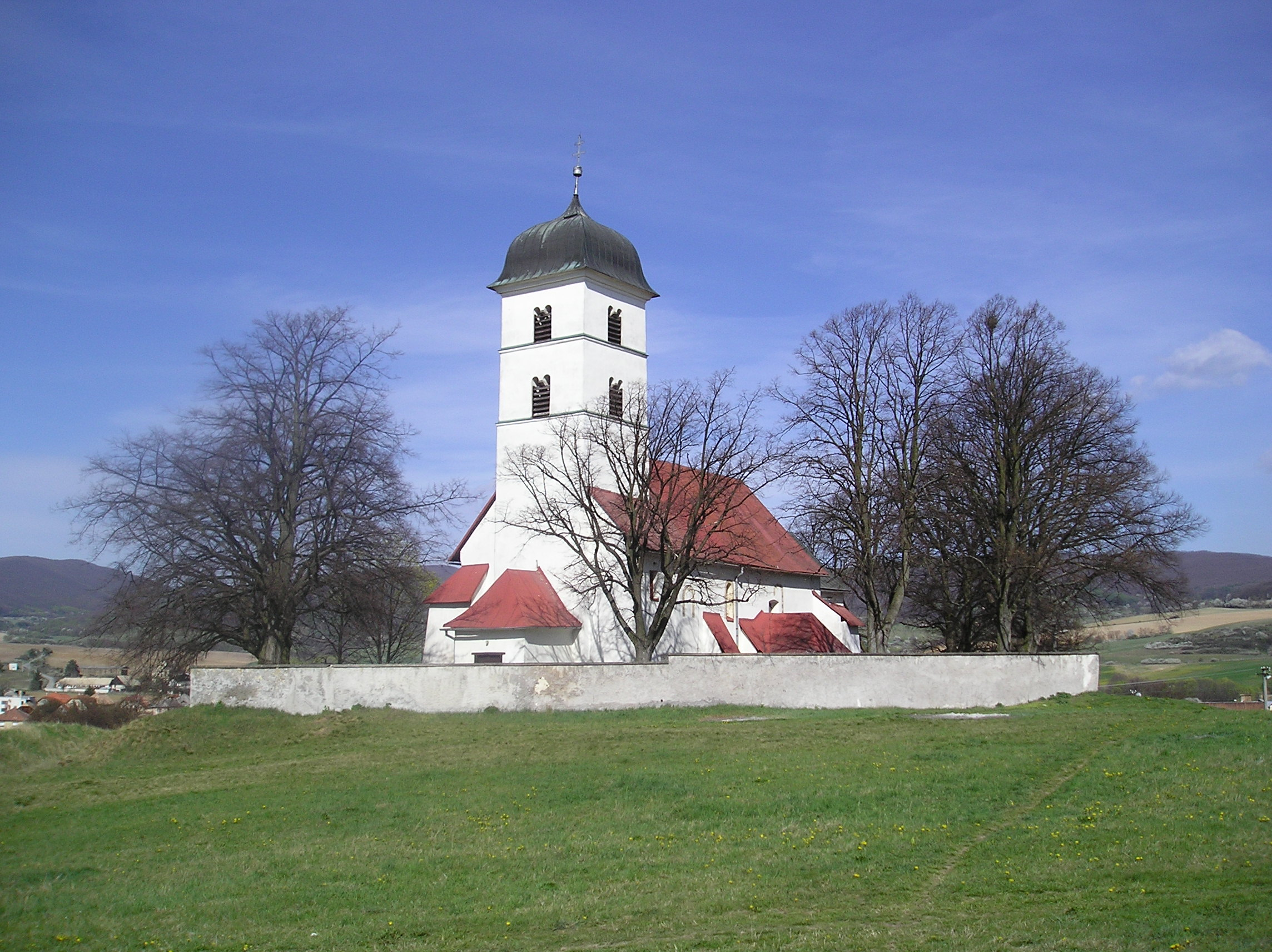

- Flag

- Location of Sása in the Banská Bystrica Region Location of Sása in Slovakia
- Coordinates: 48.44°N 19.13°E
- Country: Slovakia
- Region: Banská Bystrica Region
- District: Zvolen District
- First mentioned: 1332

Area
  - Total: 24.64 km^{2} (9.51 sq mi)
- Elevation: 383 m (1,257 ft)

Population (2025)
  - Total: 840
- Time zone: UTC+1 (CET)
  - Summer (DST): UTC+2 (CEST)
- Postal code: 962 62
- Area code: +421 45
- Vehicle registration plate (until 2022): ZV
- Website: www.sasa.sk

Sása (Hungarian: Szászpelsőc) is a village and municipality of the Zvolen District in the Banská Bystrica Region of Slovakia.

== Population ==
Population statistic (10 years)
Year	1995	2005	2015	2025
Count	884	980	934	840
Difference		+10.85%	−4.69%	−10.06%

Population statistic
Year	2024	2025
Count	830	840
Difference		+1.20%

It has a population of 840 people (31 December 2025).

=== Ethnicity ===
Census 2021 (1+ %)
Ethnicity	Number	Fraction
Slovak	854	96.27%
Not found out	27	3.04%
Romani	10	1.12%
Total	887	

In year 2021 was 887 people by ethnicity 854 as Slovak, 27 as Not found out, 10 as Romani, 5 as Hungarian, 4 as Czech, 4 as Russian, 1 as Romanian and 1 as Polish.

Note on population: The difference values of population numbers in the table "Population statistic" and in the sections "Ethnicity" & "Religion" is caused by the use of various statistical methods.

=== Religion ===
Census 2021 (1+ %)
Religion	Number	Fraction
Roman Catholic Church	416	46.9%
Evangelical Church	226	25.48%
None	199	22.44%
Not found out	28	3.16%
Total	887	

In year 2021 was 887 people by religion 416 from Roman Catholic Church, 226 from Evangelical Church, 199 from None, 28 from Not found out, 6 from Other, 4 from Ad hoc movements, 2 from Christian Congregations in Slovakia, 2 from United Methodist Church, 1 from Jewish community, 1 from Other and not ascertained christian church, 1 from Hinduism and 1 from Greek Catholic Church.

== History ==
Before the establishment of independent Czechoslovakia in 1918, Sása was part of Zólyom County within the Kingdom of Hungary. From 1939 to 1945, it was part of the Slovak Republic.
