= Babina Stena =

Babina Stena is a mountain peak in Kosovo. The approximately 780 m (2,559 ft) high Babina Stena is located at 43.210278°N 20.601111°E.

It marks Kosovo's border with Serbia, with the Town of Novi Pazar on the Serbian side.
