= Nicolas Babin =

French businessman

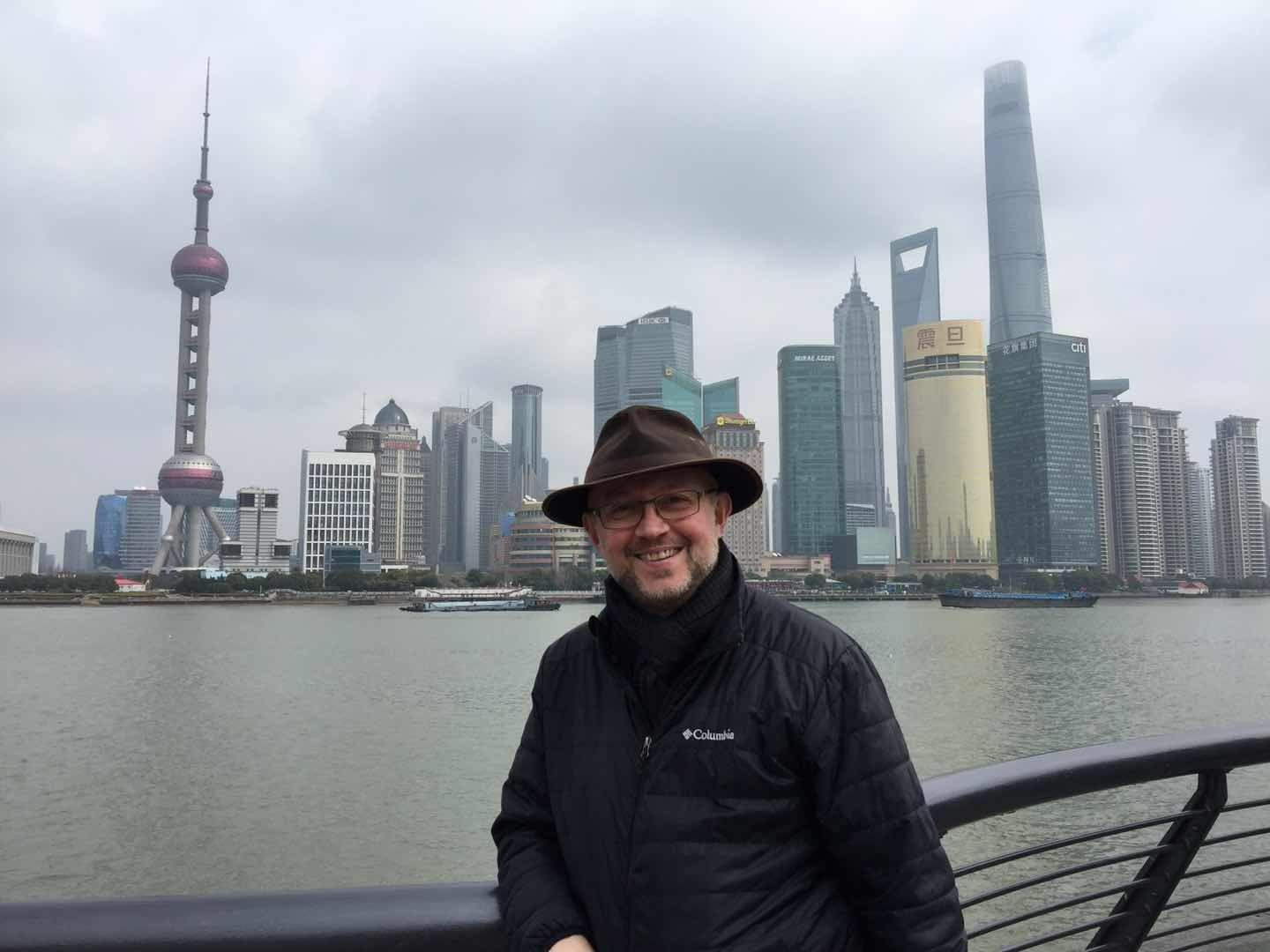
- Nicolas Babin in 2018
- Born: April 9, 1966 (age 60); Bordeaux, France
- Education: École supérieure des ingénieurs commerciaux de Bordeaux
- Occupations: Former Director of Corporate Communication Sony Europe; Co-founder GamFed; Co-founder MirambeauAppCare; Founder Babin Business Consulting; Deputy Mayor of Arcachon
- Spouse: Sara E. Ashworth
- Awards: Innovation Award at the Las Vegas Consumer Electronics Show
- Website: nicolas-babin.blogspot.fr

Nicolas Babin (born April 9, 1966) is a French businessman, specialized in gamification, artificial intelligence, as well as technological innovation. He is best known for being the former CEO of Sony Europe in several departments, including robotics. Starting in 2020, he took an active role in local politics in Gironde.

== Early life and career ==
Nicolas Babin studied at the École supérieure des ingénieurs commerciaux de Bordeaux in computer science. He is the holder of a master in Sales-Marketing. He began his career in 1989 for BNP Paribas as a programmer in San Francisco. He moved to California as a result. In 1992, he left BNP Paribas in order to take the head of the French and German branches for Atwork Health Systems. He then left Atwork in order to take the head of Administration for Cats Software US, thus moving to Palo Alto, in California. He notably contributed to its IPO, before becoming the Managing Director EMEA for Cats Software in London.

== Career ==
=== The Sony Years (1997-2008) ===
Nicolas Babin began his career for Sony in 1997, where he became the Managing Director for Sony Europe for Etak a unit of the Sony group specialized in digital mapping in London.

In 2001, while living in Brussels and being the Managing Director for Sony Entertainment Robot Europe, he contributed to the launch of AIBO, Sony's robotic pets. In 2004 he became the Director of Corporate Communications Sony Europe in Berlin and contributed to the marketing of the most recent Sony products. In 2005, he also contributed to the launch of the PSP in Europe.

In 2006, during the battery recall controversy that Sony faced (some notebook computers from brands like Toshiba, Dell, Lenovo or Apple were provided with built-in lithium batteries that could provoke fire due to overheating, causing property damage or minor burns, forcing Sony to initiate the biggest recall policy in the world at the time), Nicolas Babin was heavily involved in the crisis management.

=== Technological innovations (2008-2017) ===
Nicolas Babin left Sony in 2008 in order to join AT Internet, a French company specialized in web analytics, becoming the company Chief Operating Officer. He occupied this post during the Google bug in 2009, or when Microsoft allowed other browsers on their machines. In 2010, he became the Managing Director of the Groupe Concoursmania in France, specialized in online competition and marketing gaming. He notably managed the IPO process of the Groupe Concoursmania, as well as its development in Europe.

He then joined Neopost in 2013, a French company specialized in franking machines or postage meters as the marketing Director and as the head of the group of Digital Solutions. He then left Neopost in 2017.

Nicolas Babin is also a board member of several companies, including Commanders Act, Maxicoffee or GamFed, a company he founded in 2012 in order to develop gamification.

=== Consulting (2017-) ===
In March 2017, Nicolas Babin founded his own company Babin Business Consulting, specialized in consulting, marketing, innovations and business development, which he presides since then.

Nicolas Babin is also the cofounder of Mirambeau AppCare, which product includes DiabiLive, an app allowing diabetics to better cope with their disease, thanks to a personalized monitoring of food and exercise, an optimized insuline dosage management and also a panic button in case of emergency. He also manages the international development of this app, notably in the United States, where they are waiting the Food and Drug Administration authorization to be available, but also in Japan, in Canada or in the United Arab Emirates, where it was notably showcased in the Arab Health trade show. Diabilive won several prizes including the French Concours Lépine, rewarding innovation in 2016, as well as the Consumer Electronics Show Innovation Award in 2018. In addition to diabetes, Nicolas Babin is looking to expand this concept to others debilitating diseases.

Since 2020, Babin works as a consultant for several companies, like Huawei, Google or IBM, as a specialist in all matters concerning artificial intelligence or 5G. He is also a regular participant in international conferences on those topics, as well as gamification, digital disruption and leadership. He is appointed Digital Ambassador for the European Commission in 2023, joining other European specialists focusing on digital transition.

=== Other professional activities ===
Nicolas Babin also gave lectures related to marketing and gamification at Epitech or at KEDGE Business School.

During the third edition of the Digital week in Bordeaux in 2013, Nicolas Babin participated as a lecturer about gamification. Nicolas Babin also writes articles for websites like Gladiacteur or IndieWatch, specialized in marketing and gaming.

In August 2017, he founded with his wife a company specialized in real estate in Arcachon. Babin is also strongly committed to the preservation of Arcachon's seafront, having notably served as president of a specialized association dedicated to promoting the city's cultural heritage and landscapes.

During the COVID-19 pandemic, he wrote a book, dealing with the evolution of technologies from the end of the eighties to today.

Following the 2026 French municipal elections, Babin joined the electoral list of the incumbent mayor of Arcachon, Yves Foulon. Elected in the subsequent ballot, he joined the municipal council alongside the majority, taking up the position of Deputy Mayor delegated to public works, resident relations, facilities and buildings. ·

Deeply interested in issues relating to artificial intelligence, he has also organized several public discussion and outreach sessions on this topic throughout the Arcachon area. · ·

== Personal life ==
Nicolas Babin married Sara E. Ashworth in 1993. They have two children named John and Philippe.
