= Éric Babin =

Caledonia politician (1959–2021)

Personal details
- Born: 18 October 1959 Nouméa, New Caledonia
- Died: 11 January 2021 (aged 61) Voh, New Caledonia
- Party: The Rally

Éric Babin (18 October 1959 – 11 January 2021) was a New Caledonian politician.

== Biography ==
Éric Babin was a New Caledonian politician, born on October 18, 1959, in Nouméa and died on January 11, 2021, in Voh in a motorcycle accident. He was the brother of Olivier Babin, Linda Babin, and Karine Babin.

He served in the Congress of New Caledonia from 1995 to 1999 as a member of The Rally–UMP.
