= Ostrá Lúka =

Ostrá Lúka Osztroluka
- Municipality
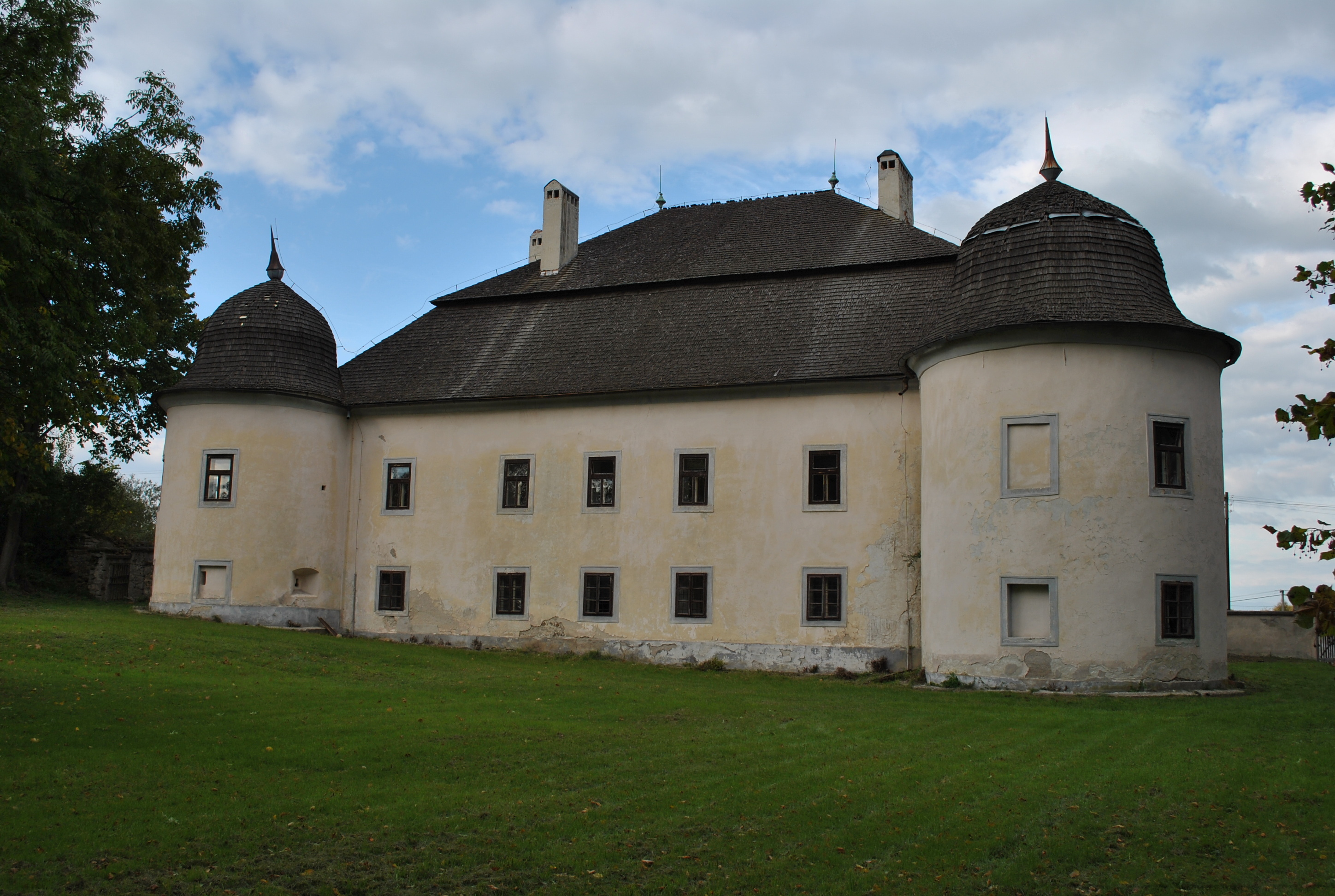
- A manor house in Ostrá Lúka.

- Flag

- Location of Ostrá Lúka in the Banská Bystrica Region Location of Ostrá Lúka in Slovakia
- Coordinates: 48.55°N 19.05°E
- Country: Slovakia
- Region: Banská Bystrica Region
- District: Zvolen District
- First mentioned: 1332

Government
  - Mayor: Juraj Jelok (Ind.)

Area
  - Total: 20.26 km^{2} (7.82 sq mi)
- Elevation: 453 m (1,486 ft)

Population (2025)
  - Total: 339
- Time zone: UTC+1 (CET)
  - Summer (DST): UTC+2 (CEST)
- Postal code: 962 33
- Area code: +421 45
- Vehicle registration plate (until 2022): ZV
- Website: www.ostraluka.sk

Ostrá Lúka (Hungarian: Osztroluka) is a village and municipality of the Zvolen District in the Banská Bystrica Region of Slovakia.

== Geography ==
The municipality lies at an altitude of 453 metres (1,486 ft) and covers an area of 20.26 km^{2} (7.82 sq mi) (2025).

== History ==
In 2024, the remains of a medieval church dating from the 13th century was found at Ostrá Lúka. A geophysical survey revealed the church's floor plan, including its rectangular nave, presbytery, and sacristy added in the 14th century, as well as a crypt and later fortification wall that surrounded the church and cemetery.

Before the establishment of independent Czechoslovakia in 1918, Ostrá Lúka was part of Zólyom County within the Kingdom of Hungary. From 1939 to 1945, it was part of the Slovak Republic.

== Population ==
Population statistic (10 years)
Year	1995	2005	2015	2025
Count	246	280	304	339
Difference		+13.82%	+8.57%	+11.51%

Population statistic
Year	2024	2025
Count	333	339
Difference		+1.80%

It has a population of 339 people (31 December 2025).

=== Ethnicity ===
Census 2021 (1+ %)
Ethnicity	Number	Fraction
Slovak	289	94.75%
Not found out	12	3.93%
Romani	10	3.27%
Total	305	

In year 2021 was 305 people by ethnicity 289 as Slovak, 12 as Not found out, 10 as Romani, 2 as Czech, 2 as Rusyn, 2 as Russian, 2 as German, 1 as Polish and 1 as English.

Note on population: The difference values of population numbers in the table "Population statistic" and in the sections "Ethnicity" & "Religion" is caused by the use of various statistical methods.

=== Religion ===
Census 2021 (1+ %)
Religion	Number	Fraction
None	115	37.7%
Roman Catholic Church	102	33.44%
Evangelical Church	63	20.66%
Not found out	11	3.61%
Greek Catholic Church	4	1.31%
Total	305	

In year 2021 was 305 people by religion 115 from None, 102 from Roman Catholic Church, 63 from Evangelical Church, 11 from Not found out, 4 from Greek Catholic Church, 3 from Other, 3 from United Methodist Church, 1 from Old Catholic Church, 1 from Eastern Orthodox Church, 1 from Paganism and natural spirituality and 1 from Hinduism.
