= Dobrá Niva =

Village and municipality in Slovakia

Dobrá Niva Dobronya
- Municipality
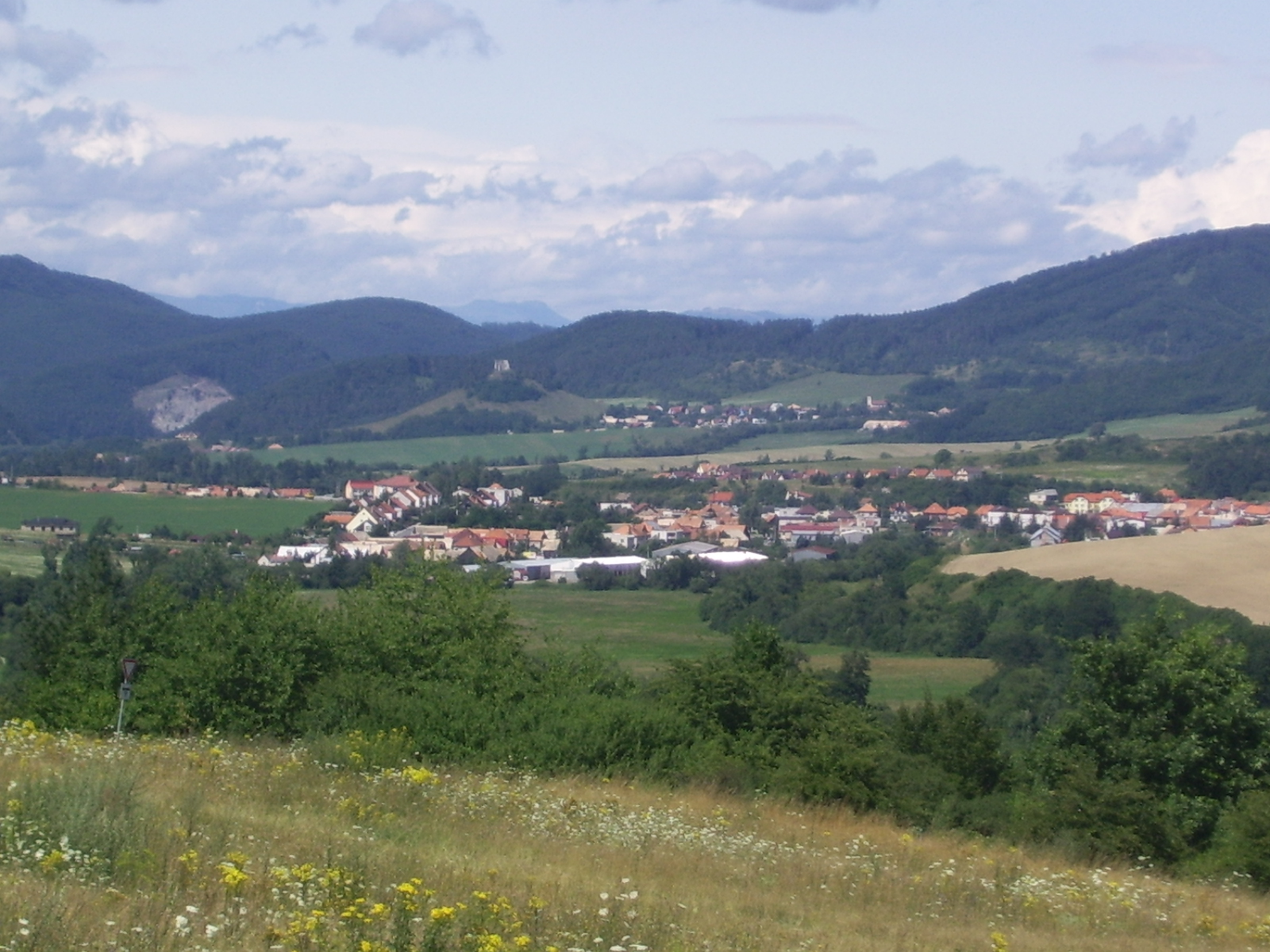

- Flag

- Location of Dobrá Niva in the Banská Bystrica Region Location of Dobrá Niva in Slovakia
- Coordinates: 48.47°N 19.10°E
- Country: Slovakia
- Region: Banská Bystrica Region
- District: Zvolen District
- First mentioned: 1254

Area
  - Total: 52.54 km^{2} (20.29 sq mi)
- Elevation: 357 m (1,171 ft)

Population (2025)
  - Total: 1,837
- Time zone: UTC+1 (CET)
  - Summer (DST): UTC+2 (CEST)
- Postal code: 962 61
- Area code: +421 45
- Vehicle registration plate (until 2022): ZV
- Website: www.obecdobraniva.sk

Dobrá Niva (German: Dobring; Hungarian: Dobronya) is a village and municipality of the Zvolen District in the Banská Bystrica Region of Slovakia. The village has a castle.

== Geography ==
The municipality lies at an altitude of 357 metres (1,171 ft) and covers an area of 52.54 km^{2} (20.29 sq mi) (2025).

== History ==
In historical records, the village was first mentioned in 1254 (Dobruna). In 1351 it was allied with the town of Sása. In the 15th century it belonged to local feudatories and, after on, to Esterházy. From 1582 to 1657 it had to pay tributes to Turks who besieged the village in 1578, 1559 and 1663. Before the establishment of independent Czechoslovakia in 1918, Dobrá Niva was part of Zólyom County within the Kingdom of Hungary. From 1939 to 1945, it was part of the Slovak Republic.

== Population ==
Population statistic (10 years)
Year	1995	2005	2015	2025
Count	1730	1813	1874	1837
Difference		+4.79%	+3.36%	−1.97%

Population statistic
Year	2024	2025
Count	1822	1837
Difference		+0.82%

It has a population of 1837 people (31 December 2025).

=== Ethnicity ===
Census 2021 (1+ %)
Ethnicity	Number	Fraction
Slovak	1826	98.06%
Not found out	23	1.23%
Total	1862	

In year 2021 was 1862 people by ethnicity 1826 as Slovak, 23 as Not found out, 10 as Czech, 8 as Other, 4 as Romanian, 3 as Russian, 2 as Ukrainian, 2 as Hungarian, 2 as French, 1 as Irish, 1 as Vietnamese, 1 as Silesian, 1 as Rusyn and 1 as Croatian.

Note on population: The difference values of population numbers in the table "Population statistic" and in the sections "Ethnicity" & "Religion" is caused by the use of various statistical methods.

=== Religion ===
Census 2021 (1+ %)
Religion	Number	Fraction
Evangelical Church	722	38.78%
Roman Catholic Church	672	36.09%
None	407	21.86%
Not found out	31	1.66%
Total	1862	

In year 2021 was 1862 people by religion 722 from Evangelical Church, 672 from Roman Catholic Church, 407 from None, 31 from Not found out, 13 from Greek Catholic Church, 5 from Ad hoc movements, 3 from Eastern Orthodox Church, 2 from Calvinist Church, 2 from Paganism and natural spirituality, 2 from Other and not ascertained christian church, 2 from Other and 1 from Hinduism.
