= Podzámčok =

Podzámčok Dobróváralja
- Municipality
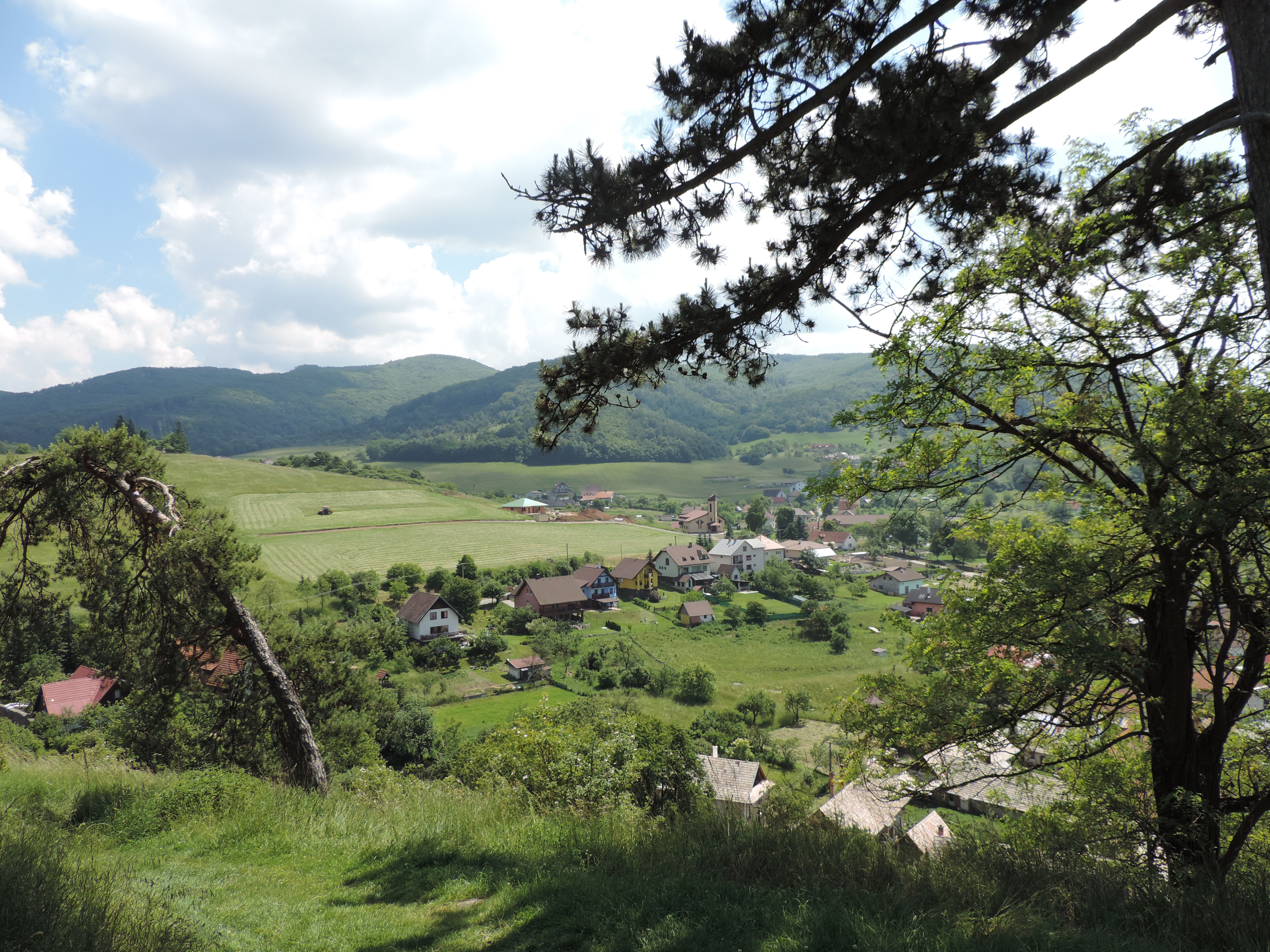

- Flag

- Location of Podzámčok in the Banská Bystrica Region Location of Podzámčok in Slovakia
- Coordinates: 48.50°N 19.12°E
- Country: Slovakia
- Region: Banská Bystrica Region
- District: Zvolen District
- First mentioned: 1424

Government
  - Mayor: Mária Hrčková (KDH)

Area
  - Total: 8.48 km^{2} (3.27 sq mi)
- Elevation: 394 m (1,293 ft)

Population (2025)
  - Total: 559
- Time zone: UTC+1 (CET)
  - Summer (DST): UTC+2 (CEST)
- Postal code: 962 64
- Area code: +421 45
- Vehicle registration plate (until 2022): ZV
- Website: www.podzamcok.sk

Podzámčok (Hungarian: Dobróváralja) is a village and municipality of the Zvolen District in the Banská Bystrica Region of Slovakia.

== Geography ==
The municipality lies at an altitude of 394 metres (1,293 ft) and covers an area of 8.48 km^{2} (3.27 sq mi) (2025).

== History ==
Before the establishment of independent Czechoslovakia in 1918, Podzámčok was part of Zólyom County within the Kingdom of Hungary. From 1939 to 1945, it was part of the Slovak Republic.

== Places of interest ==
=== Dobrá Niva Castle ===
The Dobrá Niva Castle are the ruin of a Gothic castle located in the village. It was probably built in the second half of the 13th century as a guard building on the old trade route south of Zvolen. During the Renaissance it changed owners several times, the longest time, from 1614 to 1804, it was owned by the Esterházy family. It has been abandoned since the end of the 18th century and is today a preserved ruin.

== Population ==
Population statistic (10 years)
Year	1995	2005	2015	2025
Count	338	337	517	559
Difference		−0.29%	+53.41%	+8.12%

Population statistic
Year	2024	2025
Count	555	559
Difference		+0.72%

It has a population of 559 people (31 December 2025).

=== Ethnicity ===
Census 2021 (1+ %)
Ethnicity	Number	Fraction
Slovak	537	99.07%
Total	542	

In year 2021 was 542 people by ethnicity 537 as Slovak, 5 as Not found out, 3 as Czech, 2 as Rusyn, 1 as Jewish, 1 as Ukrainian, 1 as Romani, 1 as Russian, 1 as Polish, 1 as Moravian and 1 as Hungarian.

Note on population: The difference values of population numbers in the table "Population statistic" and in the sections "Ethnicity" & "Religion" is caused by the use of various statistical methods.

=== Religion ===
Census 2021 (1+ %)
Religion	Number	Fraction
Roman Catholic Church	297	54.8%
None	181	33.39%
Evangelical Church	42	7.75%
Greek Catholic Church	6	1.11%
Total	542	

In year 2021 was 542 people by religion 297 from Roman Catholic Church, 181 from None, 42 from Evangelical Church, 6 from Greek Catholic Church, 4 from Ad hoc movements, 3 from Not found out, 2 from Eastern Orthodox Church, 1 from Christian Congregations in Slovakia, 1 from Islam, 1 from Other, 1 from United Methodist Church, 1 from Seventh-day Adventist Church, 1 from Buddhism and 1 from Bahá'i Community.
