= Landscape with Flowers =

1930 painting by Zoltán Palugyay

- Krajina s kvetmi (Slovak)
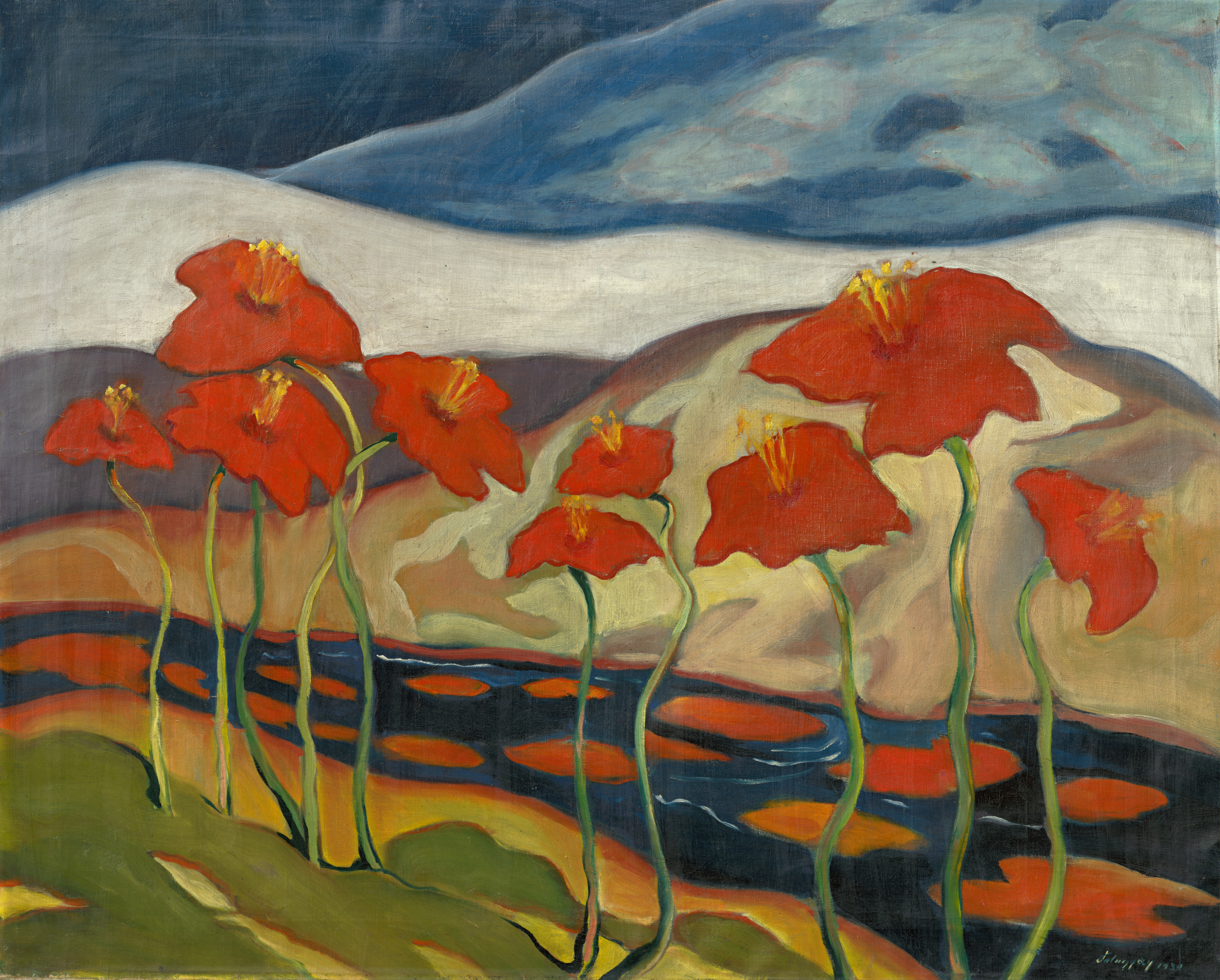
- Artist: Zolote Palugyay
- Year: 1930
- Medium: oil on canvas
- Dimensions: 80 cm × 100 cm (31 in × 39 in)
- Location: National Gallery of Slovakia; Bratislava

Landscape with flowers (Slovak: Krajina s kvetmi) is an oil painting by the Slovak artist Zoltán Palugyay from 1930. The picture was painted in oil on canvas and measures 80 x 100 cm. It is now in the Slovak National Gallery in Bratislava. It is considered a formative work for modern art in Slovakia and one of the most remarkable works of the artist.

== Analysis ==
Thanks to his stays in Budapest, Kraków, Munich and Paris, he became acquainted with modern art. Zoltan Palugyay was influenced by Edvard Munch and Paul Gauguin and introduced symbolism to his landscapes. Landscape with flowers became the emblematic archetype for a series of paintings in the 1930s, his most productive period. The shapes and colors are combined in a way that underlines the symbolic message of the picture.
