= To Boyfriend =

Painting by Jozef Hanula

- Za frajerom (Slovak), За момчето (Bulgarian)
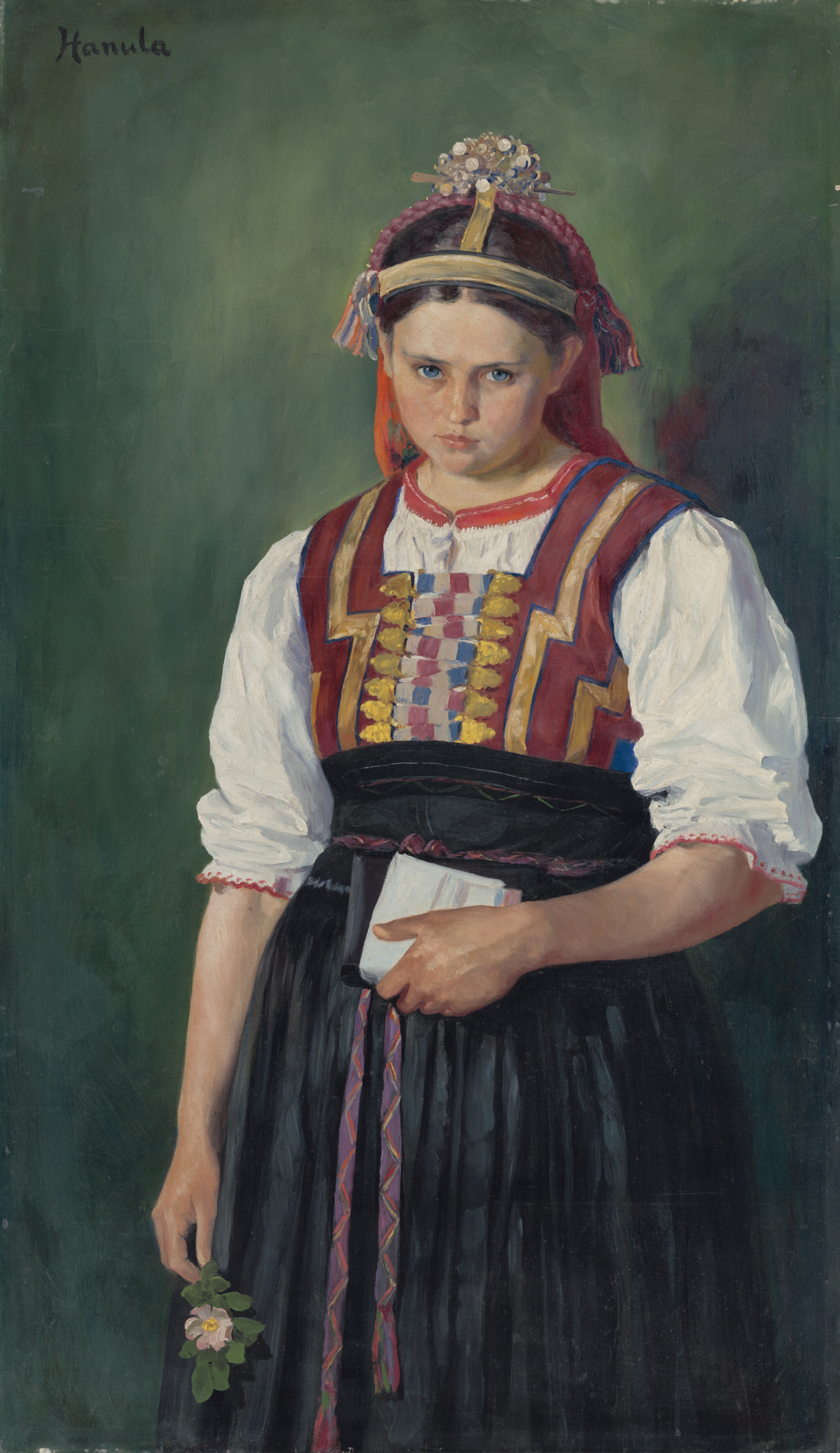
- Artist: Jozef Hanula
- Year: 1900
- Medium: Oil on canvas
- Dimensions: 120 cm × 70 cm (47 in × 28 in)
- Location: Slovak National Gallery, Bratislava

To Boyfriend (Slovak: Za frajerom) is a portrait by Slovak artist Jozef Hanula from about 1900.

== Description ==
The painting is oil on canvas and measures 120 × 70 cm.

The picture is part of the collection of the Slovak National Gallery in Bratislava.

== Analysis ==
The best works of Hanula are from the period 1900–18. He is best recognized and remains known for his genre paintings, which he created following his return to the homeland after studying abroad. He made a studied effort to correctly present folk costumes and details in his subjects' hands and faces. The painting had great success during the exhibition of Slovak and Moravian artists in Hodonín in 1902. The painting depicts a young girl in a typical girls' folk costume. She holds a prayer book in her left and hand a wildflower in her right. Critics note that the work brings nostalgic feelings, but its nature constitutes an allegory of the Slovak nation suffering under foreign rule. The picture became a symbol of Slovak art and the whole nation.
