= Dobrá Niva Castle =

Ruined castle in Slovakia

- Dobrá Niva hrad
- Podzámčok, Banská Bystrica Region, Slovakia
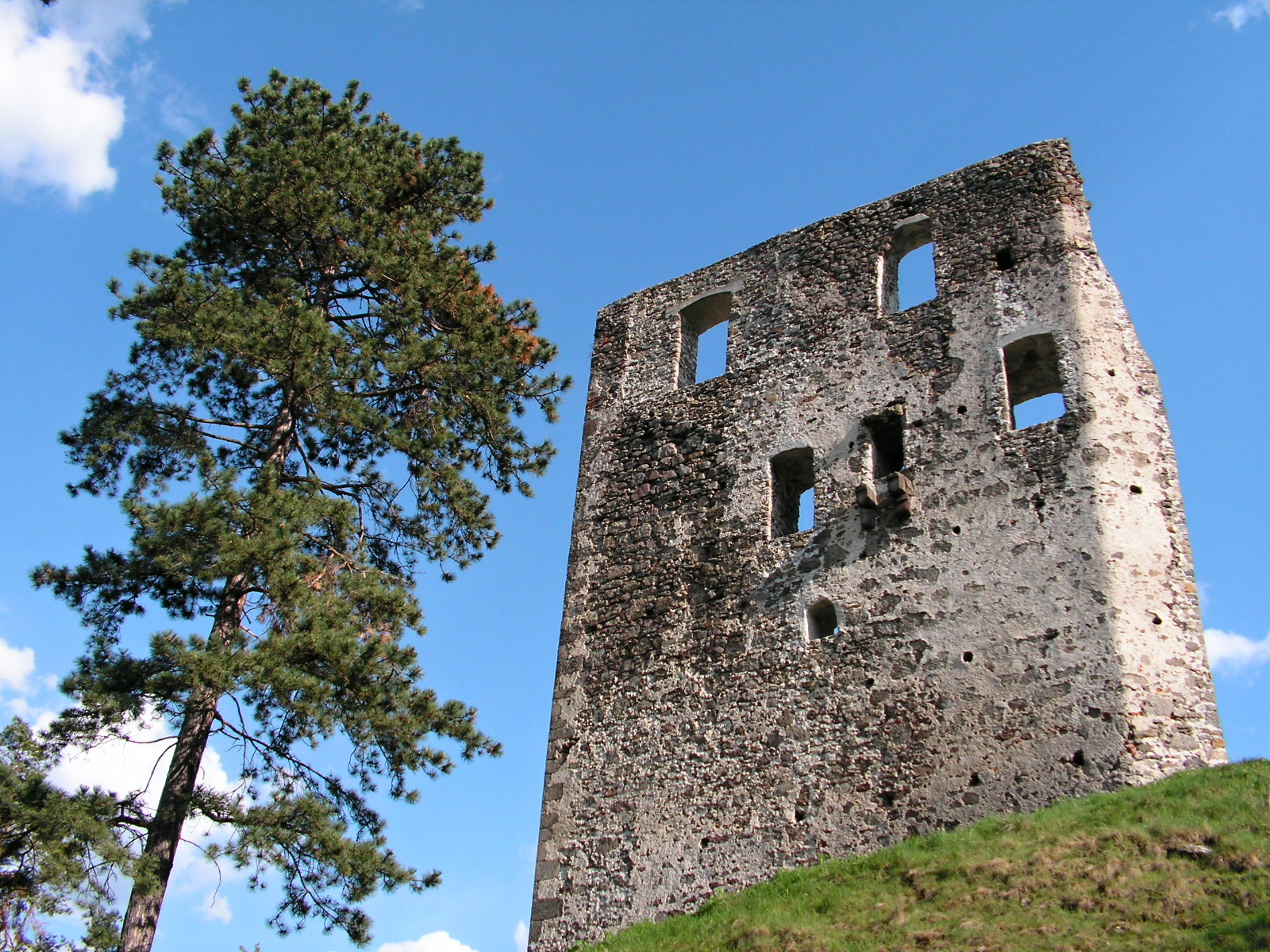
- Front view

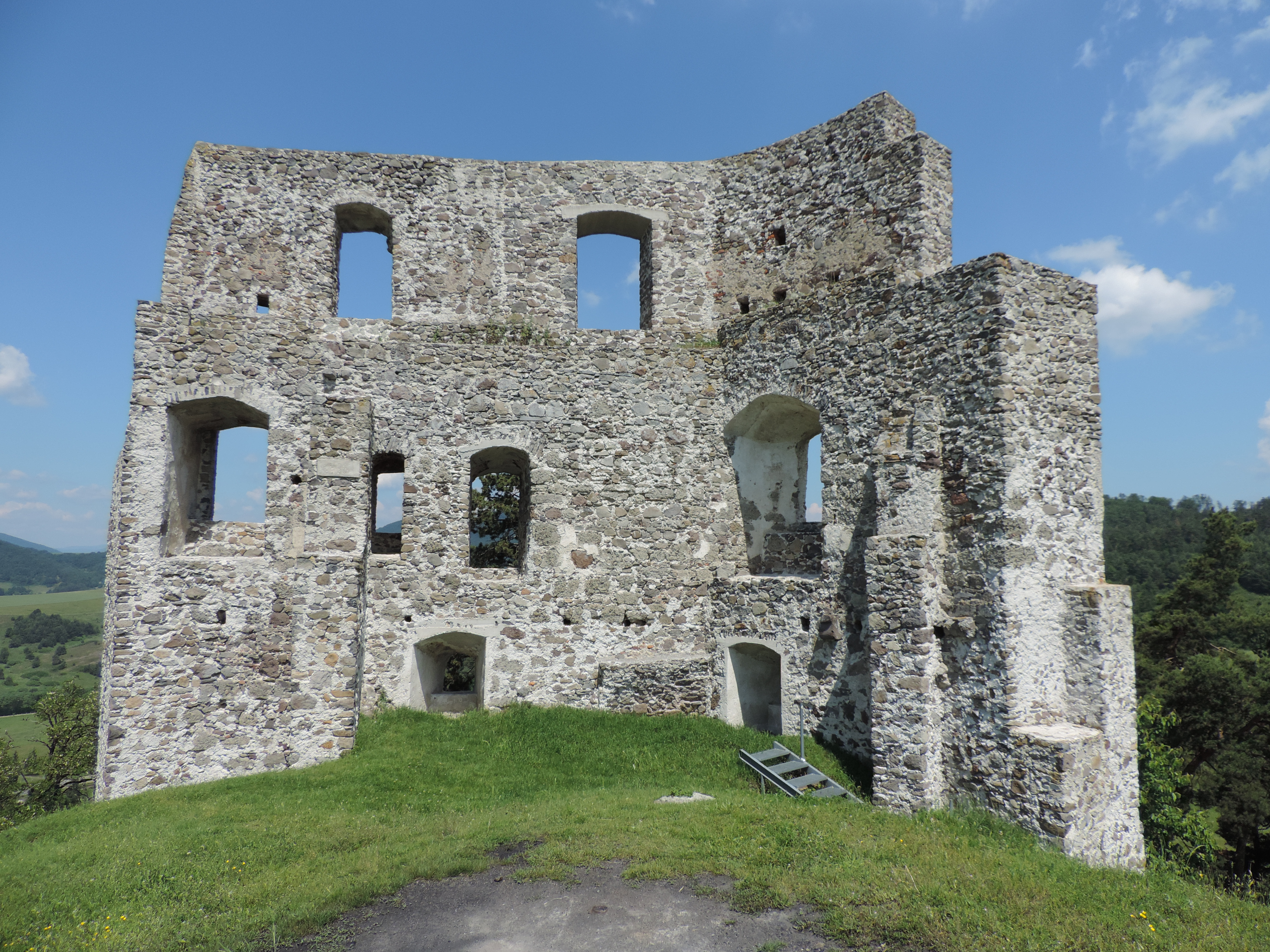
- View from behind

Site information
- Type: Castle

Location
- Coordinates: 48.503056°N 19.103611°E

Dobrá Niva Castle (Slovak: Dobronivský hrad) is the ruin of a Gothic castle located in the village of Podzámčok in the Banská Bystrica Region of Slovakia.

== History ==
The castle was probably built after the Mongol invasion in the second half of the 13th century as a guard building on the old trade route south of Zvolen (known as the Via magna). It was mentioned in documents only in 1305–1306. It was the center of the Dobroniv royal estate until the 16th century. In the 15th century (1424–1486) it belonged to the queens. By the beginning of the 17th century the castle was in such a bad condition that the administration of the Dobroniv estate moved to a new building, which was built in the castle grounds in 1609. The castle changed owners several times during the Renaissance before becoming the property of the Esterházy family, who held it until it was purchased by the royal chancellery in 1805. It began to be abandoned by the beginning of the 18th century, and fell into disrepair. It remains as a preserved ruin.

== Exterior ==
The castle consisted of a two-storey palace, a tower and stone walls. The outer fortification was earthen. The defense of the deep ditches and wide ramparts, which were arranged in a ring around the hill, was certainly strengthened by firing from the castle. However, no loopholes have been preserved that would indicate this. In the outer earthen fortification, which resembles the English type of motte castle, there are also traces of protrusions, as if of a flanking bastion. The description of the castle from 1668 describes the castle palace as a stone structure, protected by two gates, a bastion and strong fortifications.

== Findings ==
During archaeological research at the castle between 2013–2014, numerous ceramic fragments, mainly Renaissance ceramics, tiles, metal and bone objects, animal bones, and melting crucibles were discovered at the castle. The finds also included a denarius of Sigismund of Luxembourg. A small cemetery in the castle grounds with several stone crosses, was found. It is assumed that the inhabitants of the castle are buried there, last living in the castle sometime in the late 17th or early 18th centuries.

== See also ==
- List of castles in Slovakia
