= Mária Mázorová =

Slovak folklorist (1928–2016)

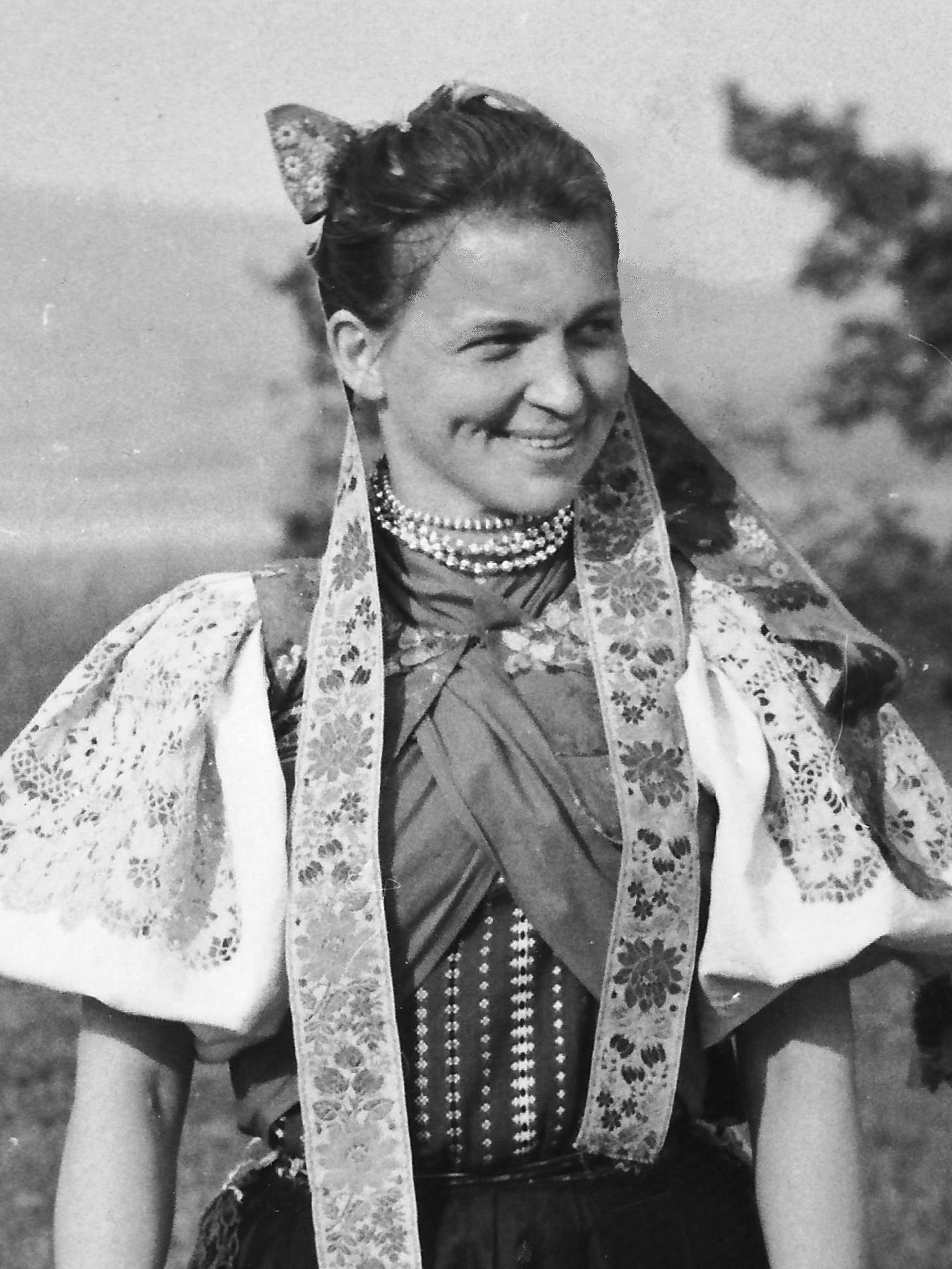
- Born: Marie Panczaková; 8 February 1928; Prague, Czechoslovakia
- Died: 12 February 2016 (aged 88); Zvolen, Slovakia
- Occupation: Folklorist
- Known for: Founder of Zornička and Marína folklore groups

Mária Mázorová (née Marie Panczaková; 8 February 1928 - 12 February 2016) was a Slovak folklorist, folklore dancer and choreographer of Czech-Ukrainian origin. She was the founder of two Slovak folklore groups, Zornička and Marína.

== Life ==
Mázorová was born in Prague to Ukrainian emigrants originally from Lviv, Ukraine. She studied English and Slavic Languages at the Charles University but did not graduate. After leaving the university, she became a full-time folklore dancer. In 1953 she married a Slovak folklorist and dancer Martin Mázor. They had three children together. In 1960, the family moved to Zvolen, where Mázorová established herself as an important personality of the folklore community.

== Folklore ==
In 1966 Mázorová established the folklore group Marína by joining three existing smaller groups. She also founded the child folklore group Zornička in 1967. She was in charge of the group until 1981. She also taught and developed guidelines for teaching folklore dancing at the regional public art schools. She was a part of organizing committee of folklore festivals at Východná and Detva.

== Death ==
Mázorová died in Zvolen on 12 February 2016. A large performance of local folklore groups took place on the Main Square of Zvolen in June 2016 to commemorate Mázorová's life and contributions to development of Slovak folklore.
