= Pustý hrad =

Castle in Zvolen, Slovakia

Coordinates: 48.5569°N 19.1097°E

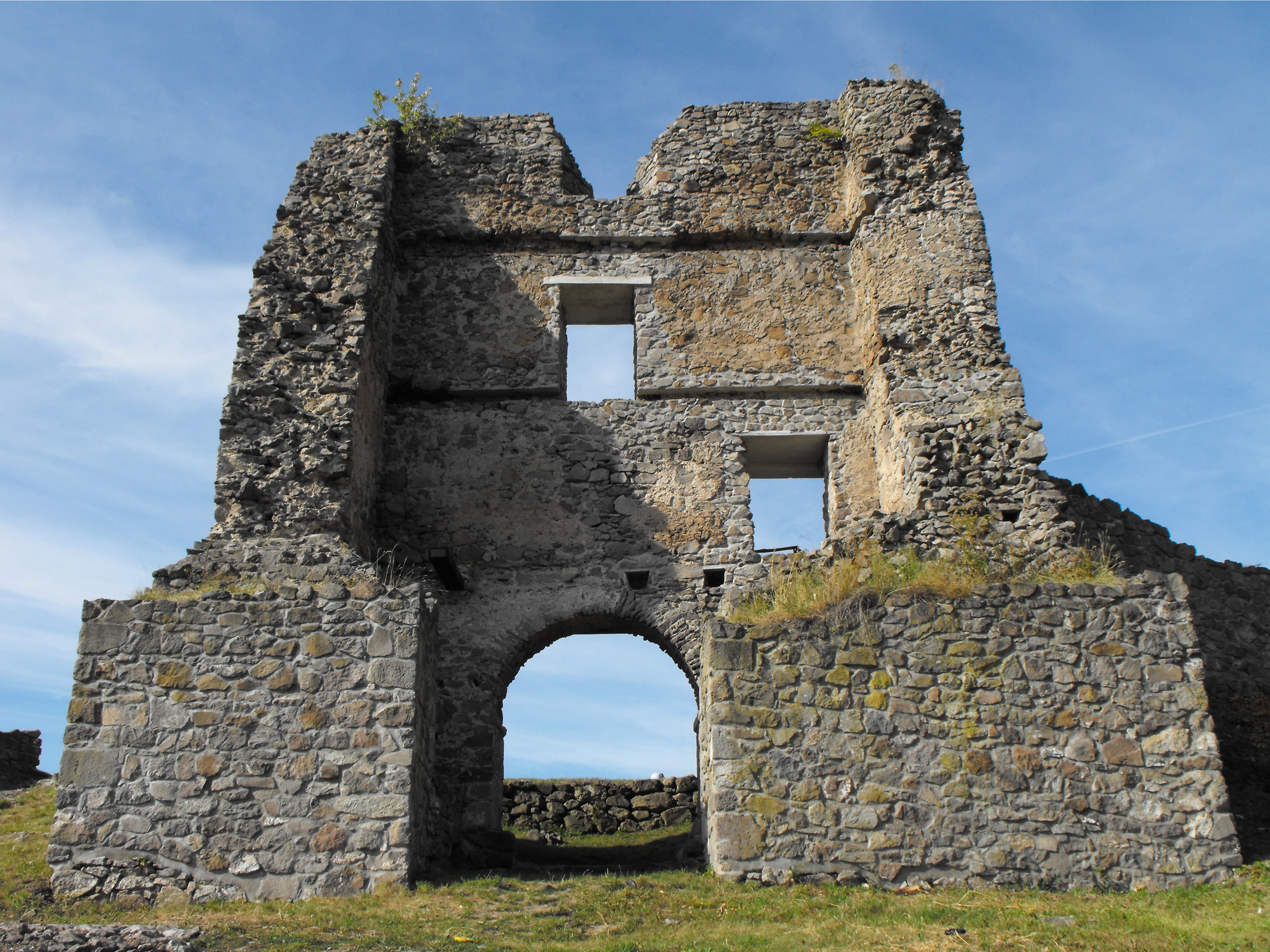
Enter gate of Upper Pustý castle.

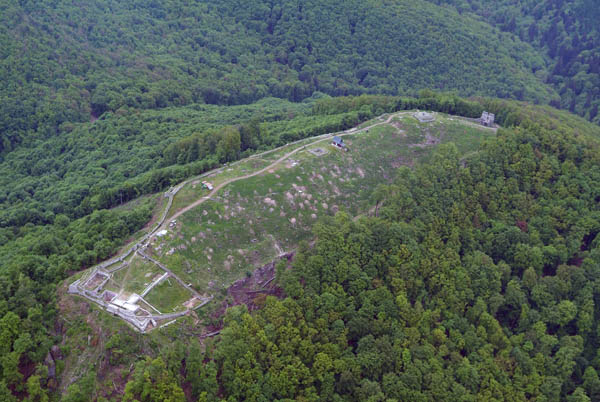
Aerial view of the Pustý castle.

Pustý hrad (Hungarian: Pusztavár) is a castle whose ruins are located on a forested hill in the southern part of Zvolen in central Slovakia. With an area of 76,000 m² it is arguably one of the largest medieval castles in Europe. The original name was Zvolen Castle or Old Zvolen (Hungarian: Zólyom); Pustý hrad (meaning "deserted castle") is a much later name used to distinguish the ruin from the present-day Zvolen Castle. Pustý hrad consists of two parts, the Upper Castle and the Lower Castle.

The strategic hill site upon the river Hron attracted settlers as early as the late Stone Age (Baden culture). A stone-earth wall discovered in 2009 under the western line of medieval fortification included shreds of pottery from the late Stone Age inside its filling. Research carried out at the Upper Castle in 1992–2008 by Václav Hanuliak also identified stone walls built during the Bronze Age and the Iron Age. Excavations have unearthed many precious prehistoric artifacts, including several big bronze treasures of the Lusatian culture, fragments from the Kyjatice culture, and even pottery imported from the Roman Empire. The subsequent Slavic medieval castle was founded in the 9th century.

As a regional center, Pustý hrad was incorporated into the Kingdom of Hungary and it became a seat of Zólyom County. The oldest stone buildings (for example the keep) are attributed to King Béla III of Hungary. The keep from the 12th century is located at the highest point of the hill - at an elevation of 571 m above sea level - and was once 50 meters high. In the 13th century, an exceptionally large area of the present castle was fully fortified by the royal stonemason master Bertold in order to protect eventual refugees from Zvolen in case of a Mongol invasion. Both the Upper (3.5 ha) and the Lower (0.65 ha) Castle were surrounded by massive fortifications and a 206 metre long defense wall was erected in the saddle below the Lower Castle. In addition to an older keep, another one was built around the same time. Its dimensions of 20 by 20 meters made it one of the largest residential buildings in Central Europe at that time. Pustý hrad was first mentioned in written sources at the beginning of the 13th century, in the chronicle Gesta Hungarorum.

Subsequent development was connected with counts Demetrius and Doncs from the Balassa family. Magister Knight Doncs was a noble warrior and diplomat serving to Charles I of Hungary. Under the influence of his journey to France, Doncs built a significant extension in the Lower Castle and ordered a Gothic modernization. During that phase a four-storey tower was added to the entrance gate of the Upper Castle. A palace, a water tank, a terraced courtyard and other newly constructed buildings in the northern panhandle of Pustý hrad formed what is now known as Doncs' Castle.

The castle lost its importance in the 15th century, the period of military conflicts between John Hunyadi and John Jiskra of Brandýs. Pustý hrad was ruined by fire during a siege in 1452, probably burnt down by John Hunyadi's troops. The last building constructed on the site was a watchtower erected in the second half of the 16th century.

Systematic excavations have been conducted since 1992. Some parts of the castle have been recently reconstructed and the site is easily accessible from Zvolen.

== Gallery ==
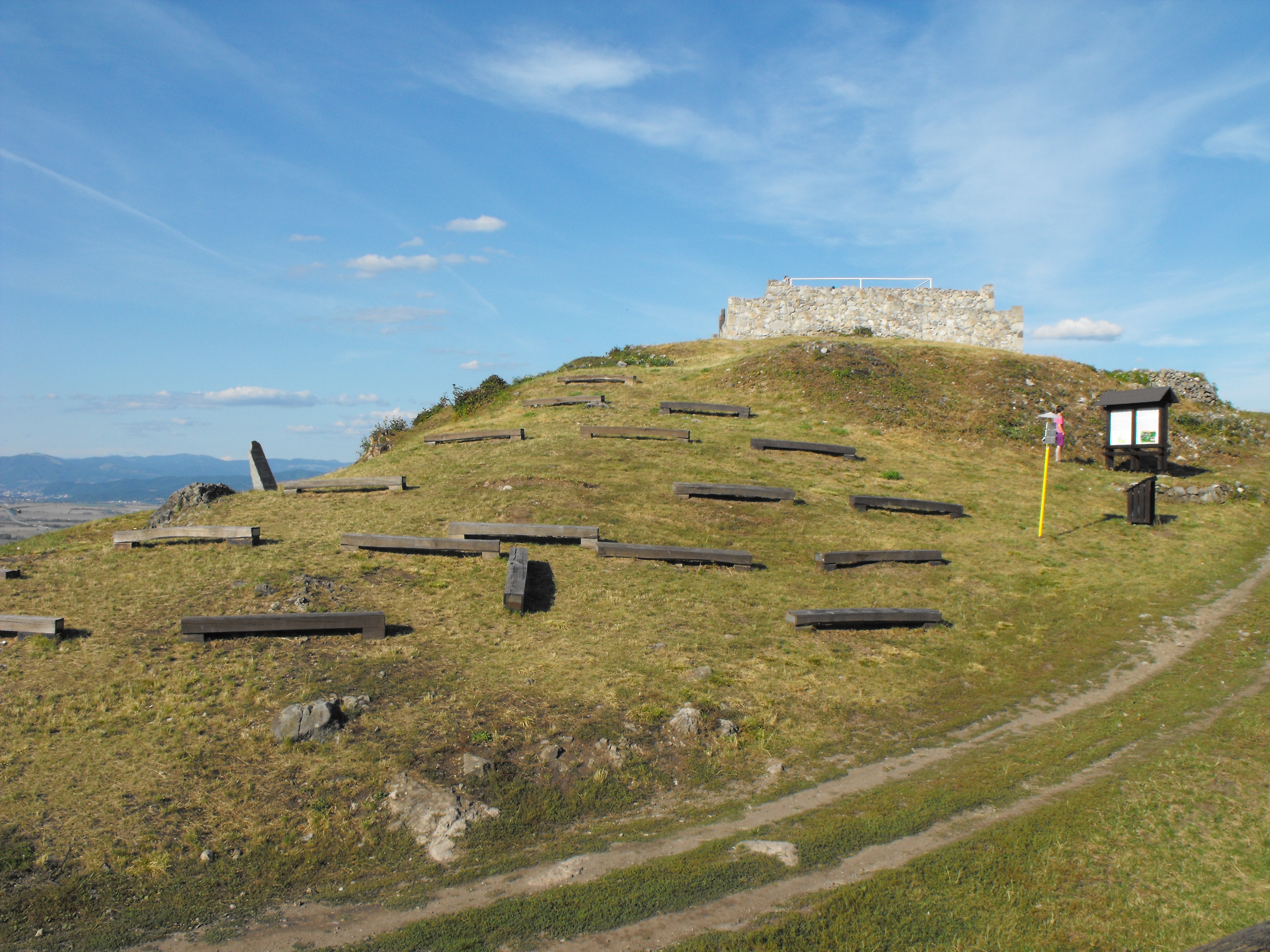
Courtyard near to enter gate

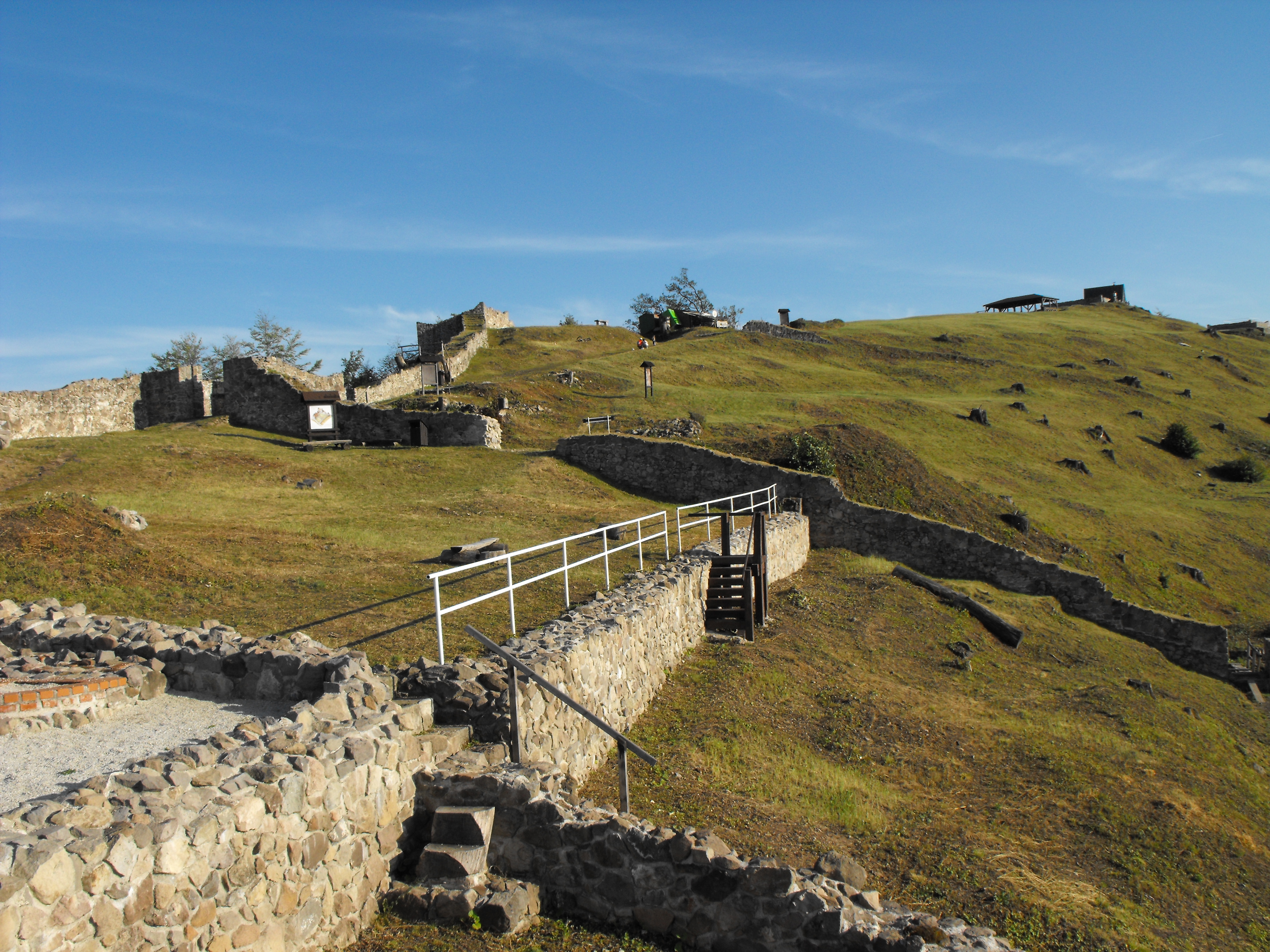
Courtyard

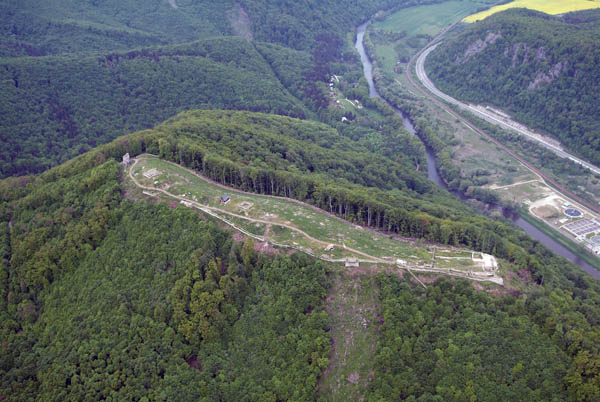
Aerial view

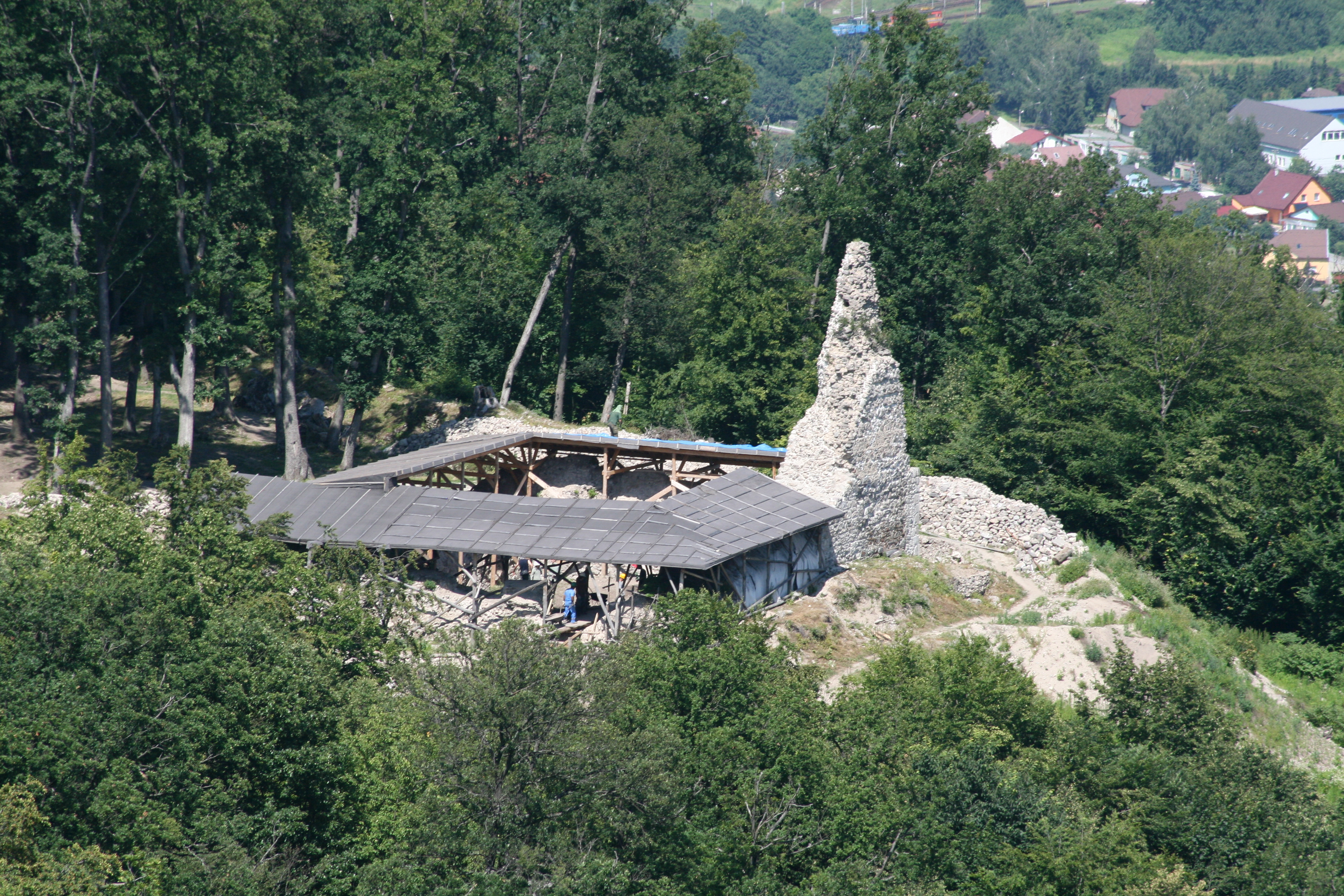
Lower castle (Dolný hrad)

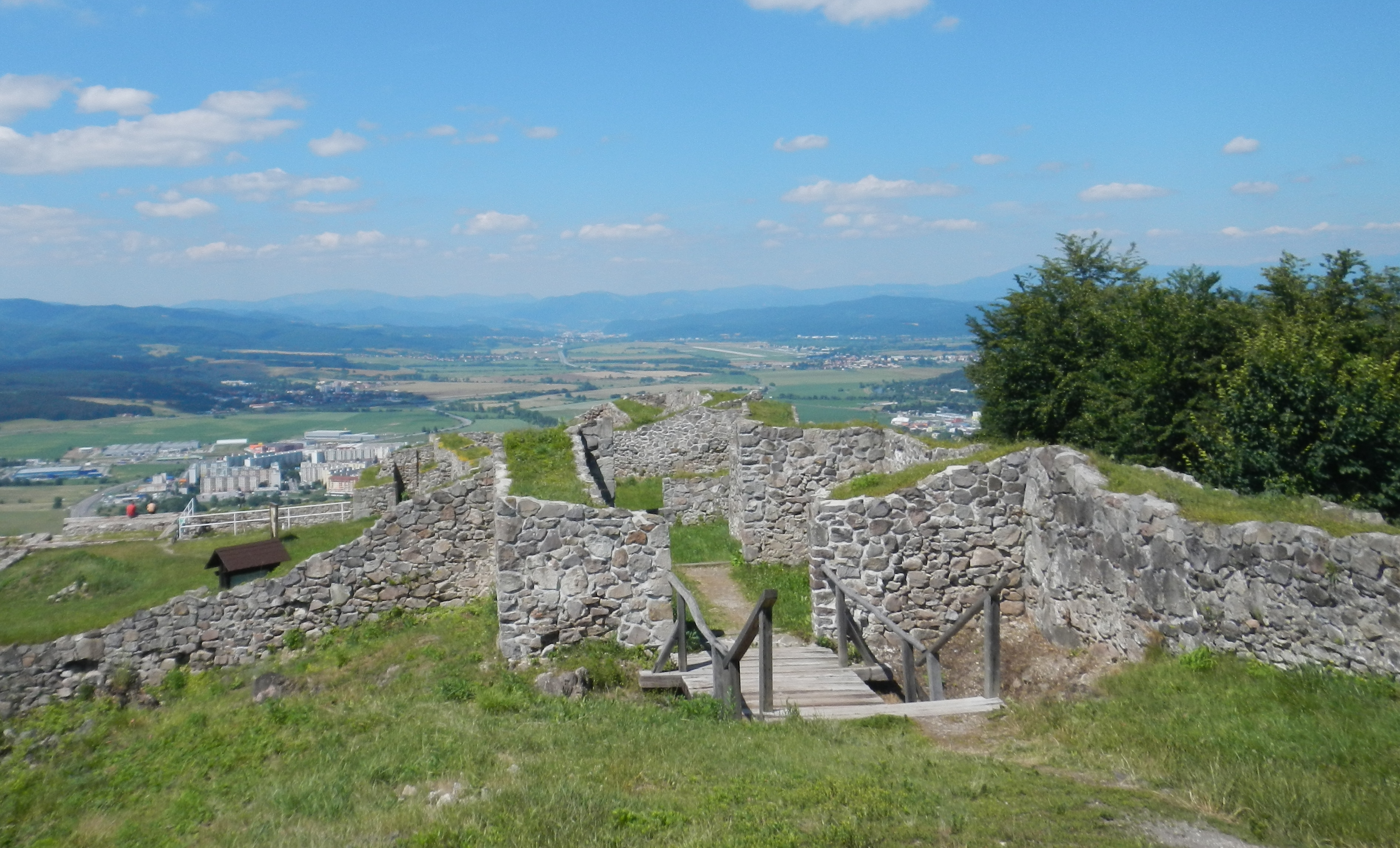
Donč's Castle (Dončov hrad)
