= Zólyom County =

County of the Kingdom of Hungary

Zólyom County Comitatus Zoliensis (Latin) Zólyom vármegye (Hungarian) Komitat Sohl (German) Zvolenská župa (Slovak)
- County of the Kingdom of Hungary
- 14th century–1920
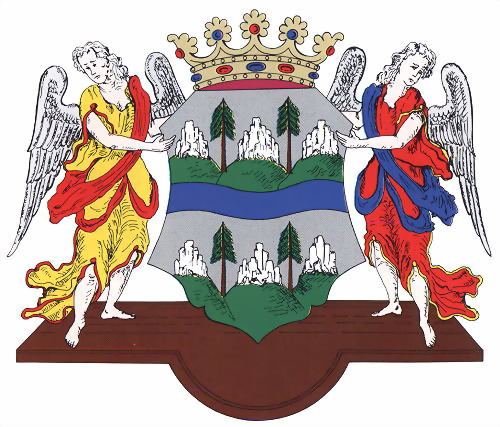
- Coat of arms

- Capital: Zólyom (historic seat until 1760s); Besztercebánya (from 1760s)
- Area
  - Coordinates: 48°34′N 19°07′E
  - 1910: 2,634 km^{2} (1,017 sq mi)
- Population
  - 1910: 133,653
- History
  - Established: 14th century
  - Treaty of Trianon: 4 June 1920
- Today part of: Slovakia
- The county's original seat was Pustý hrad (Pusztavár) near Zvolen, then from the late 15th century Zvolen Castle. The administration moved to Banská Bystrica (Besztercebánya) in the 1760s.

Zólyom county (Latin: Comitatus Zoliensis; Hungarian: Zólyom (vár)megye; Slovak: Zvolenský komitát/Zvolenská stolica/Zvolenská župa; German: Sohler Gespanschaft/Komitat Sohl) was an administrative county (comitatus) of the Kingdom of Hungary. Its territory is now in central Slovakia.

== Geography ==
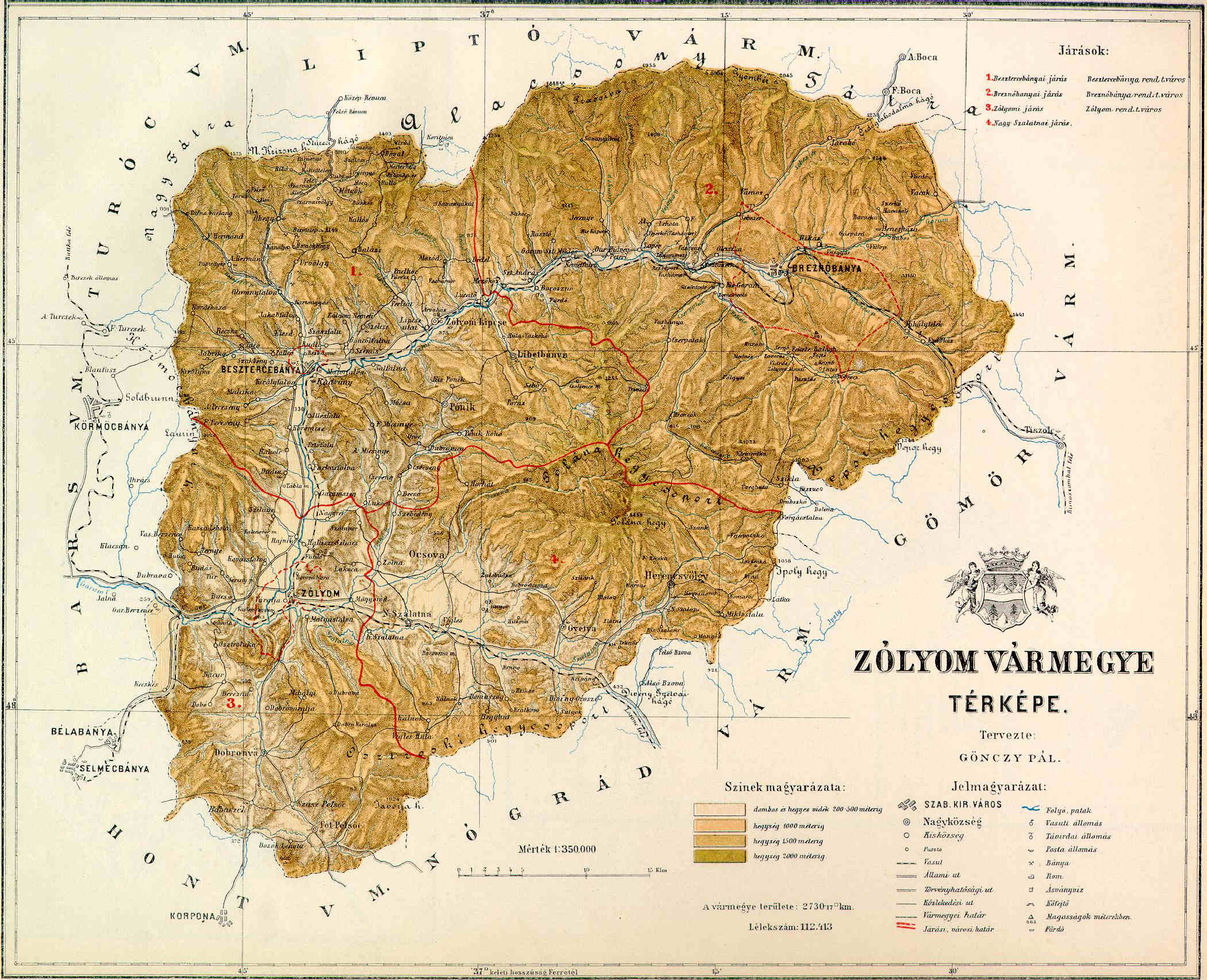
Map of Zólyom, 1891.

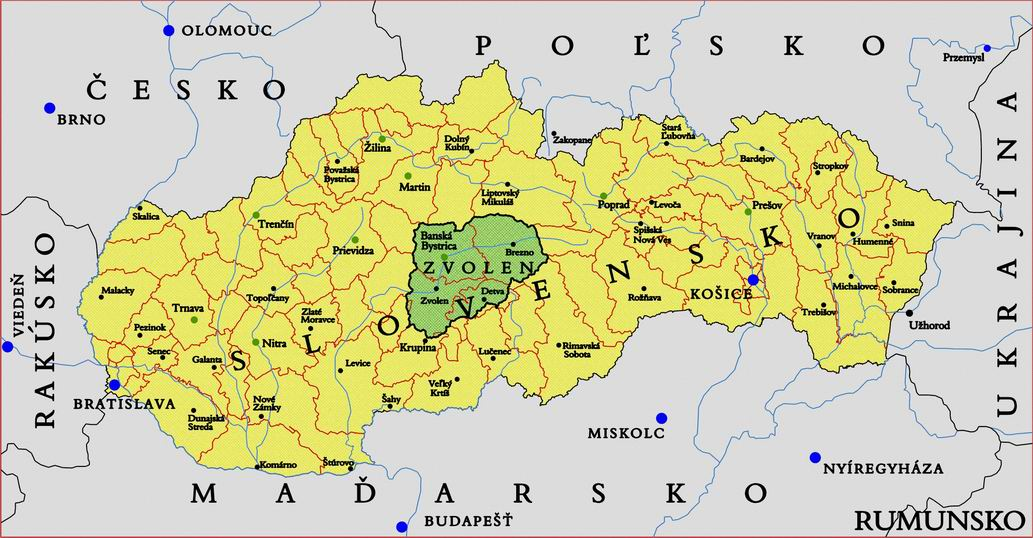
Former county of Zólyom superimposed on map of contemporary Slovakia.

Zólyom county shared borders with the counties of Bars, Turóc, Liptó, Gömör-Kishont, Nógrád and Hont. The county's territory was situated along the central Garam river, approximately between (excluding) Korpona and (including) Breznóbánya. Its area was 2634 km^{2} around 1910. The county was characterised by extensive mining activities.

== Capitals ==
The capital of the county was the castle of Pusztavár near Zólyom, then from the late 15th century the Zvolen Castle (Hungarian: Zólyomi vár) and from the 1760s the town of Besztercebánya.

== History ==
Zólyom county arose as a Hungarian comitatus in the 14th century, when most parts of the territory were conquered by the Kingdom of Hungary, from a huge royal property (the Vetusolium dominium). Initially, it comprised with a territory of the latter separated Árva, Turóc and Liptó counties.

In the aftermath of World War I, Zólyom county became part of newly formed Czechoslovakia, as recognized by the concerned states in 1920 by the Treaty of Trianon. The Zvolen county (Zvolenská župa) continued to exist until 1927, but it had completely different powers etc. and somewhat different borders. During the existence of the newly created Slovak State (1939–1945), Hron county (Pohronská župa) was created in 1940, whose territory roughly corresponded to that of the Zvolen county. The capital was Banská Bystrica.

Together with the Slovak parts of Hont and Gömör, it became part of the Banská Bystrica Region (Banskobystrický kraj) created in 1948. In 1993, Czechoslovakia was split and the Zvolen county became part of Slovakia.

== Demographics ==
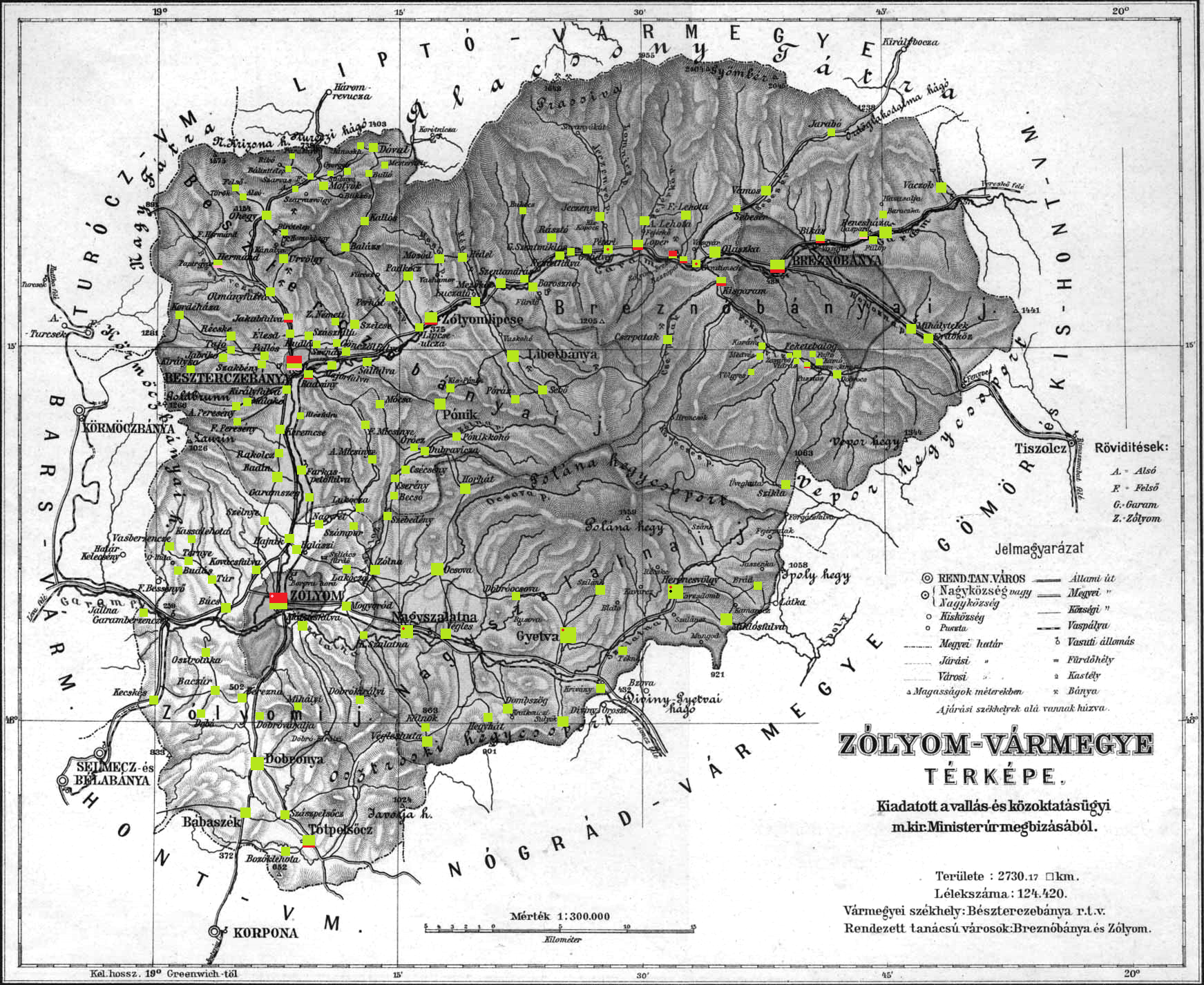
Ethnic map of the county with data of the 1910 census (see the key in the description).

Population by mother tongue (Note: Only linguistic communities > 1% are displayed.)
Census	Total	Slovak	Hungarian	German	Other or unknown
1880	102,500	92,621 (93.50%)	2,664 (2.69%)	3,007 (3.04%)	769 (0.78%)
1890	112,413	103,648 (92.20%)	4,549 (4.05%)	3,268 (2.91%)	948 (0.84%)
1900	124,420	111,050 (89.25%)	9,078 (7.30%)	2,945 (2.37%)	1,347 (1.08%)
1910	133,653	113,294 (84.77%)	16,509 (12.35%)	2,124 (1.59%)	1,726 (1.29%)

Population by religion (Note: Only religious communities > 1% are displayed.)
Census	Total	Roman Catholic	Lutheran	Jewish	Other or unknown
1880	102,500	64,086 (62.52%)	36,275 (35.39%)	1,942 (1.89%)	197 (0.19%)
1890	112,413	71,637 (63.73%)	38,067 (33.86%)	2,422 (2.15%)	287 (0.26%)
1900	124,420	80,194 (64.45%)	40,837 (32.82%)	2,862 (2.30%)	527 (0.42%)
1910	133,653	87,036 (65.12%)	42,405 (31.73%)	3,080 (2.30%)	1,132 (0.85%)

== Subdivisions ==
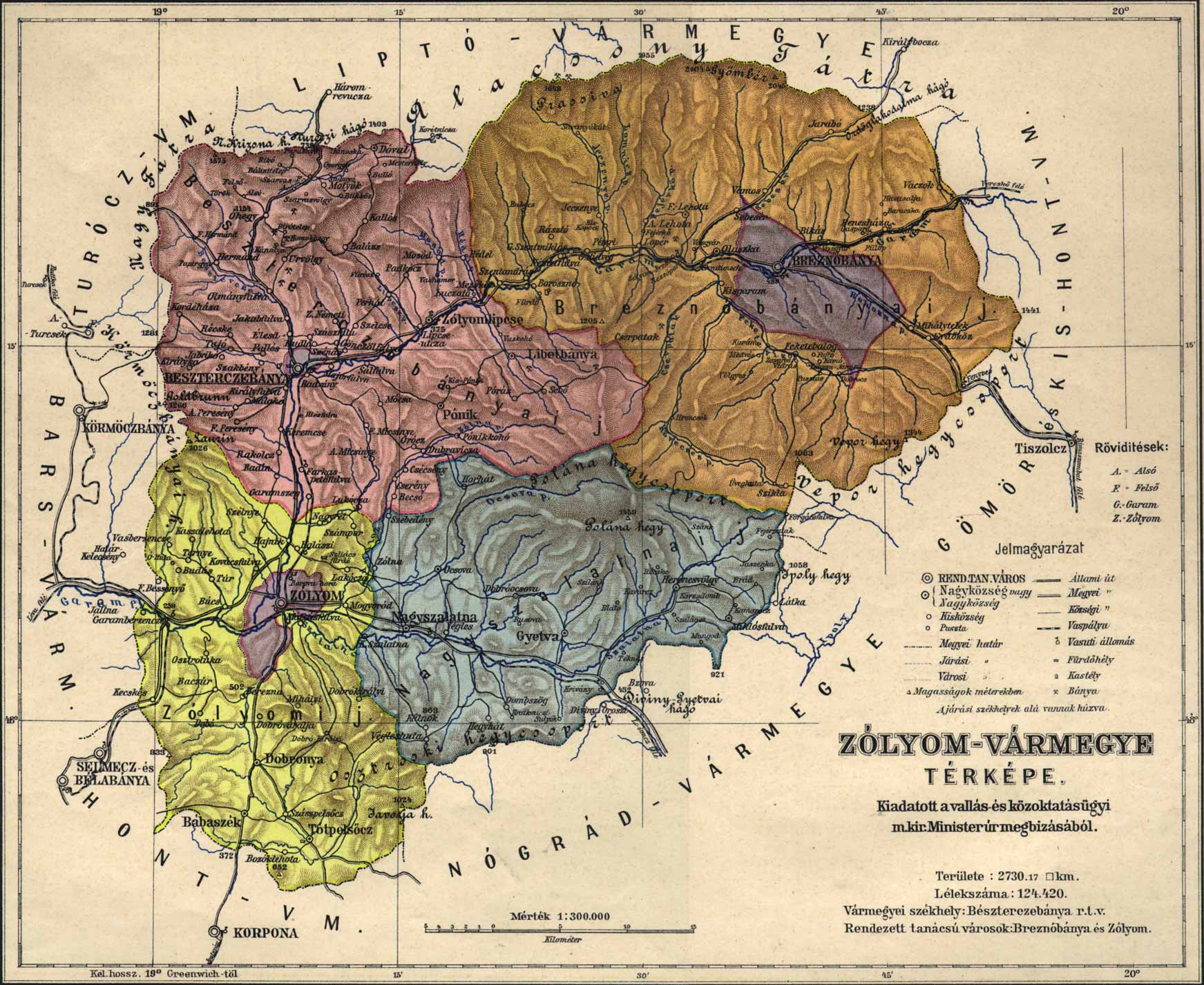

In the early 20th century, the subdivisions of Zólyom county were:

Districts
District	Capital
Besztercebánya	Besztercebánya (now Banská Bystrica)
Breznóbánya	Breznóbánya (now Brezno)
Nagyszalatna	Nagyszalatna (now Zvolenská Slatina)
Zólyom	Zólyom (now Zvolen)
Urban districts (rendezett tanácsú város)
Besztercebánya (now Banská Bystrica)
Breznóbánya (now Brezno)
Zólyom (now Zvolen)
