= Zvolen Castle =

Medieval castle in Slovakia

- Zvolen, Slovakia
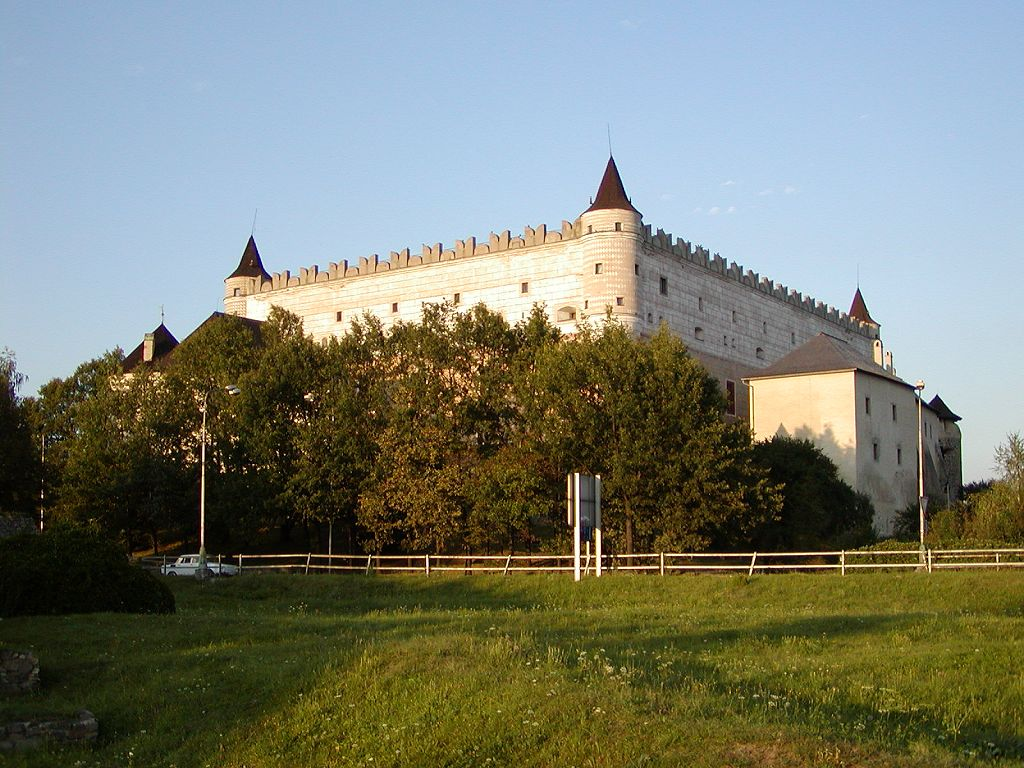
- Zvolen castle

Location
- Location in Slovakia
- Coordinates: 48.573056°N 19.127222°E

Site history
- Built: 1370s
- Built by: Louis I of Hungary

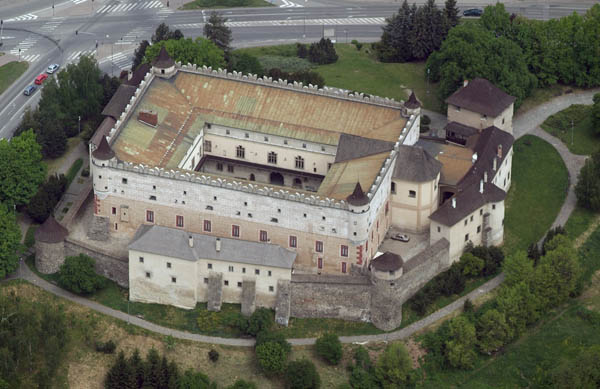
Zvolen Castle was strongly inspired by Italian castles of the fourteenth century

Zvolen Castle (Slovak: Zvolenský zámok or incorrectly Zvolenský hrad, Hungarian: Zólyomi vár) is a medieval castle located on a hill near the center of Zvolen, in central Slovakia.

The original seat of the region was above the confluence of Slatina and Hron rivers on a steep cliff in a castle from the 12th century, known today as Pustý hrad (literally, 'deserted castle'). Its difficult access had consequence in relocation of the seat to the new-built Zvolen castle, which was ordered by Louis I the Great as a hunting residence. The future queen regnant Mary of Anjou and emperor Sigismund celebrated their wedding there in 1385.

Gothic architecture of the castle built between 1360 and 1382 was inspired by Italian castles of the fourteenth century. Italian masons also contributed to a Renaissance reconstruction in 1548. The last major reconstruction occurred in 1784, when the chapel was rebuilt into the Baroque style.

Zvolen Castle hosts a regional branch of the Slovak National Gallery with an exposition of old European masters, including works by P. P. Rubens, Paolo Veronese, and William Hogarth. There is also a popular tea room located in the castle.

== History ==
Zvolen castle was built by Louis I of Hungary, who built it like a gothic hunting castle. It was finished in 1382, when it was witness to an engagement of his daughter Mary and Sigismund. John Jiskra of Brandýs, who became one of the most powerful commanders in Hungary and this castle was one of his manors from 1440 to 1462. The castle was also often visited by king Matthias Corvinus with his wife Beatrice, who used this castle as a manor from 1490.

About 1500 the external fortifications were built up with four round bastions and entrance gate. In the middle of the 16th century was built another floor with embrasures and corner oriel towers. About 1590 an artillery bastion was built also.

The castle was rebuilt many times, but it retains its Renaissance look. The castle was nominated as a National culture monument for its historic, art and architecture values and it was reconstructed in the 1960s. The Slovak National Gallery has a seat in this castle now, where it presents its expositions.

== Present ==
Every year The Zvolen Castle Plays are introduced to huge numbers of visitors. Here you can see actors and theatres from Slovakia, but also from other countries. The castle also offers a rental of its King hall, Column hall and Knightly hall, which is useful for organizing concerts, receptions, wedding ceremonies, etc. Now you can also see a computer model of this castle, which was made as an academic project.
