= Slatina (Slovakia) =

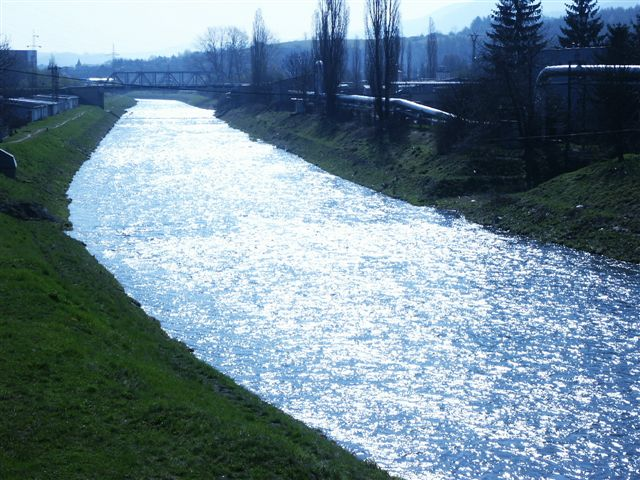
- The Slatina in Zvolen

Physical characteristics
- Mouth
  - location: Hron
  - coordinates: 48.5614°N 19.1061°E
- Length: 53 km (33 mi)
- Basin size: 793 km^{2} (306 sq mi)

Basin features
- Progression: Hron→ Danube→ Black Sea

The Slatina is a river in Slovakia. Its source is located in the mountain range Poľana, its mouth in Zvolen. It is a left tributary of the Hron. It is 53 km (33 mi) long and its basin size is 793 km^{2} (306 sq mi).
