= Slovak National Gallery =

Network of art galleries in Slovakia

Coordinates: 48.1400°N 17.1086°E

- Slovenská národná galéria
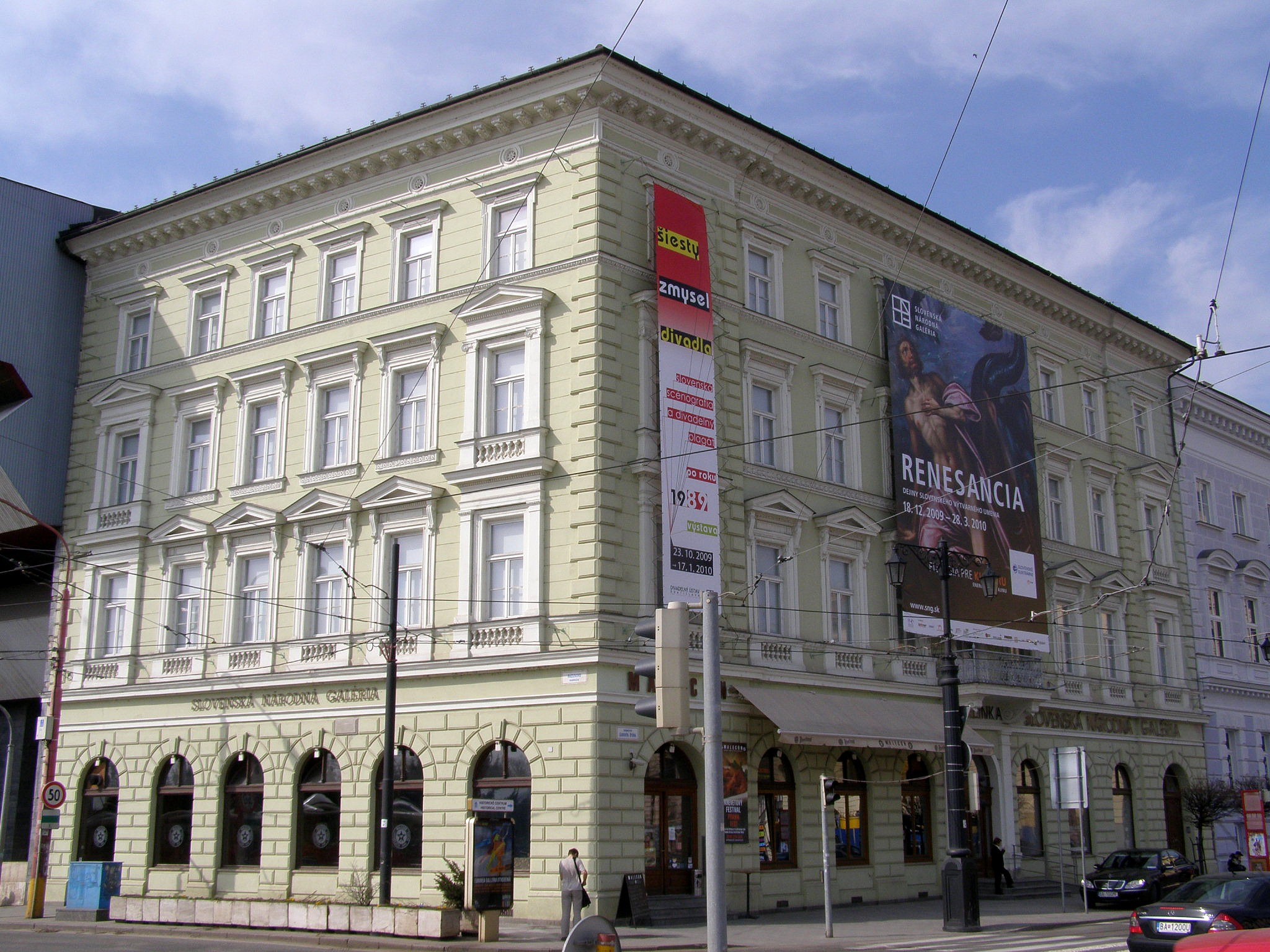
- The front of the gallery
- Established: 29 July 1949
- Location: Bratislava, Slovakia
- Type: Art gallery collection_size = Baroque art, Modern art, and more
- Website: sng.sk

The Slovak National Gallery (Slovak: Slovenská národná galéria, abbreviated SNG) is a network of galleries in Slovakia. It has its headquarters in Bratislava.

The gallery was established by law on 29 July 1949. In Bratislava, it has its displays situated in Esterházy Palace (Esterházyho palác) and the Water Barracks (Vodné kasárne) which are adjacent to each other. The Esterházy Palace was reconstructed for the purposes of the gallery in the 1950s and a modern extension was added in the 1970s.

The SNG also manages other galleries outside Bratislava: at the Zvolen Castle in Zvolen, at the Strážky mansion in Spišská Belá, in Ružomberok and in Pezinok. The Mourning portrait of K. Horvath-Stansith is considered one of the most significant acquisitions of the Baroque art collections.

== See also ==
- List of national galleries
