= Zvolen =

City in Slovakia

Zvolen Zólyom / Altsohl
- City
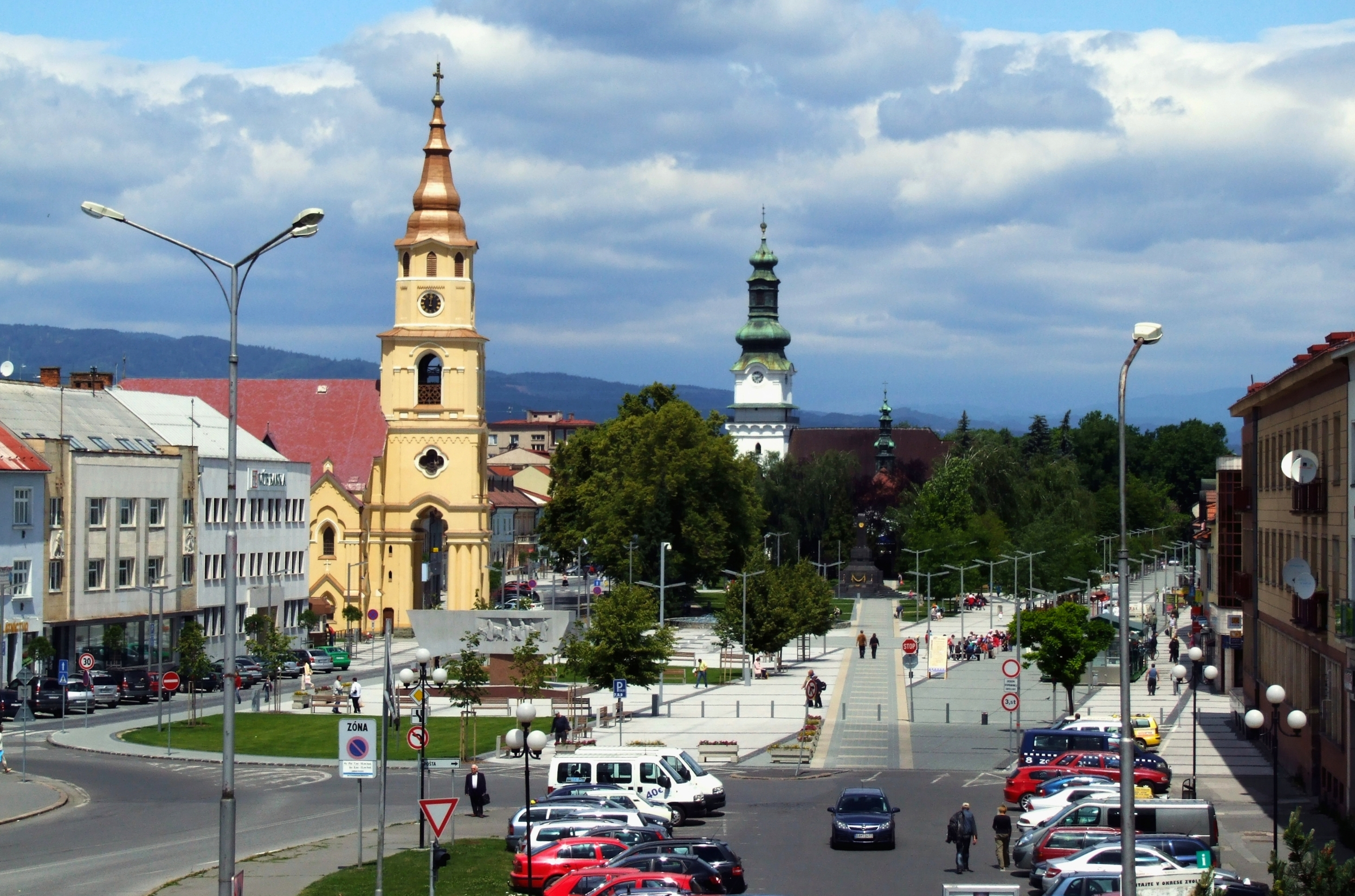
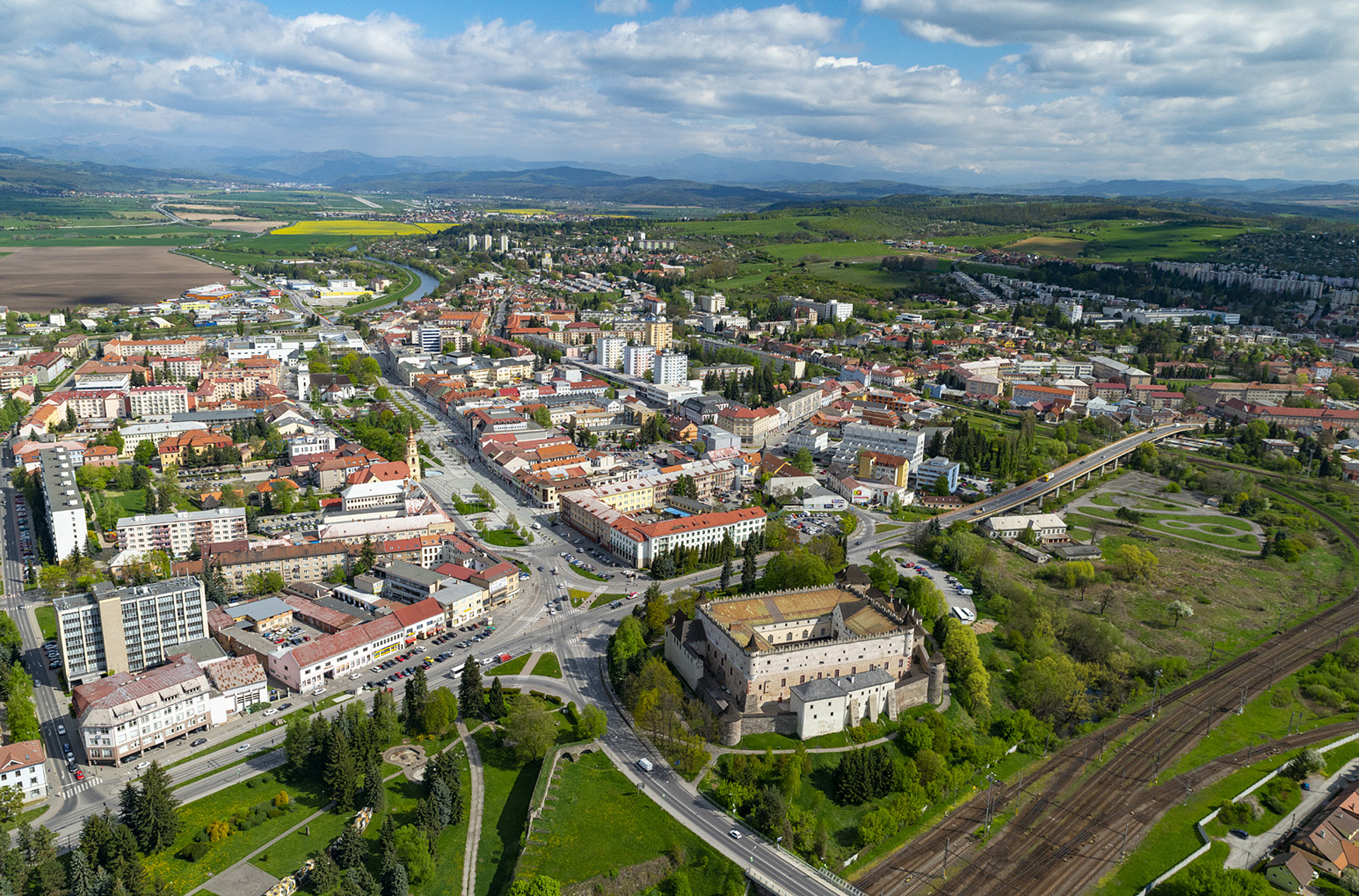
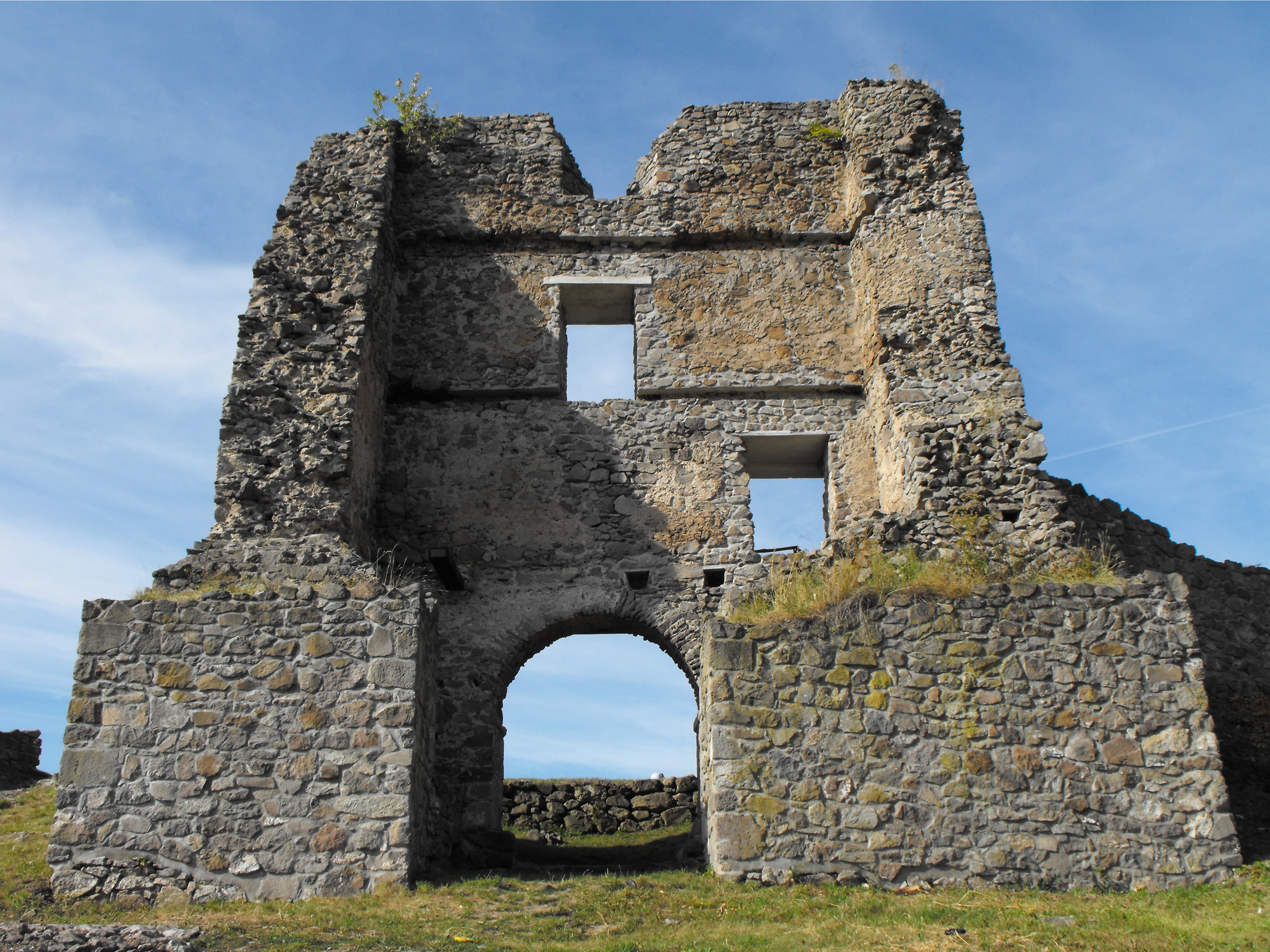
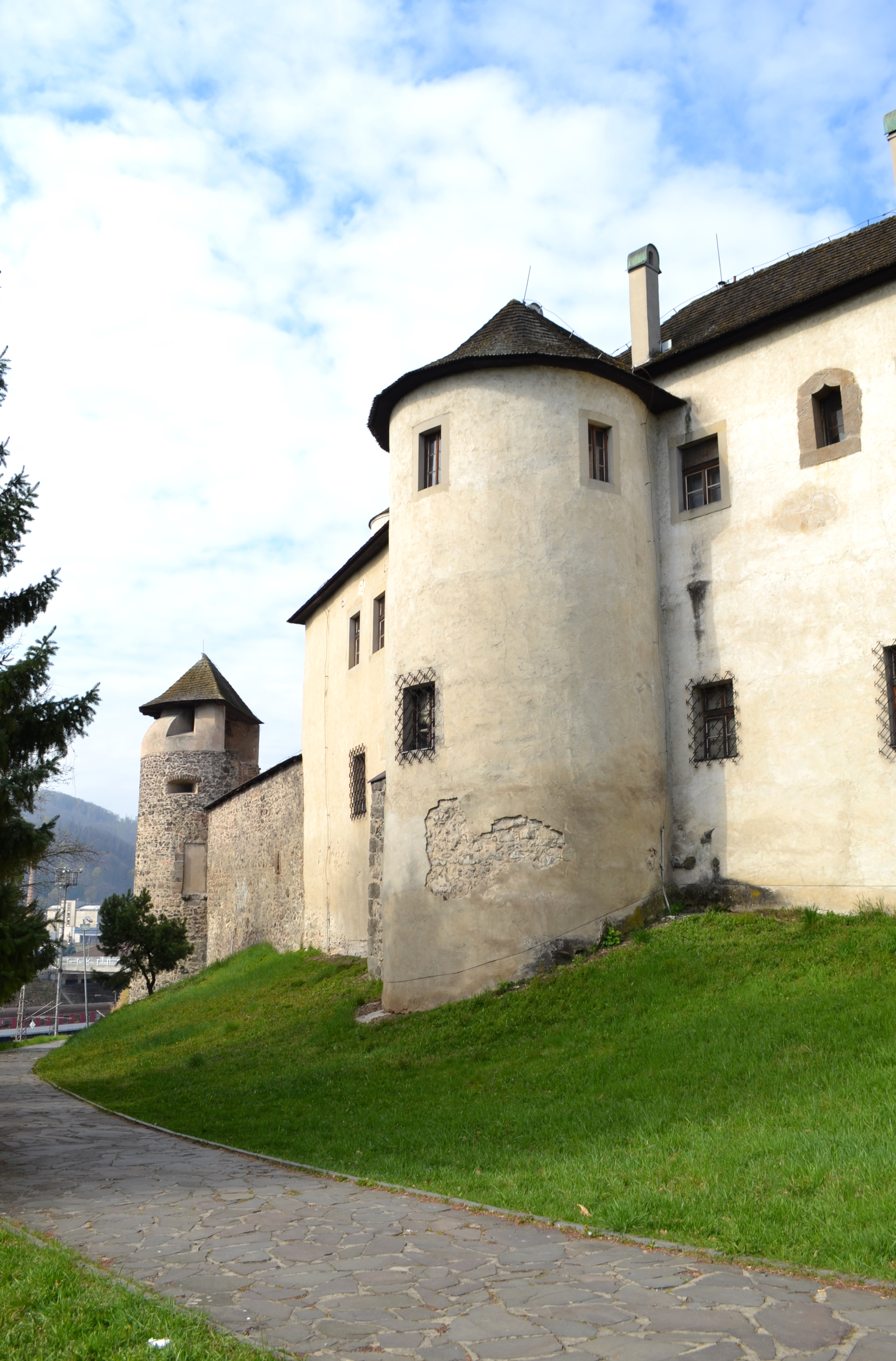
- From the top, Námestie SNP, Aerial view, Pustý hrad, Zvolen Castle

- Flag Coat of arms
- Nickname: City of the throne
- Location of Zvolen in the Banská Bystrica Region Location of Zvolen in Slovakia
- Coordinates: 48°34′14″N 19°07′3″E
- Country: Slovakia
- Region: Banská Bystrica
- District: Zvolen
- First mentioned: 1135
- Town rights: 1238

Government
  - Mayor: Vladimír Maňka

Area
  - Total: 98.727 km^{2} (38.119 sq mi)
- (2022)
- Elevation: 374 m (1,227 ft)

Population (2023-12-31)
  - Total: 40,537
  - Rank: 12th
  - Density: 410.60/km^{2} (1,063.4/sq mi)
- Demonym: (m)Zvolenčan/(f)Zvolenčanka
- Time zone: UTC+1 (CET)
  - Summer (DST): UTC+2 (CEST)
- Postal code: 960 01, 960 02, 960 03
- Area code: +421 45
- Vehicle registration plate (until 2022): ZV
- Highways: R1 R2 R3
- Website: www.zvolen.sk

Zvolen (Slovak pronunciation: [ˈzʋɔlen]; Latin: Zolium; Hungarian: Zólyom; German: Altsohl) is a city in central Slovakia, situated at the confluence of the Hron and Slatina rivers. It is known for its historical and cultural attractions. It is surrounded by the Poľana mountain to the east, the Kremnické vrchy to the west, and the Javorie and Štiavnické vrchy to the south.

The population is approximately 40,500, making it the twelfth-largest city in Slovakia by population and thirteenth by area. It is the centre of the Podpoľanie historical region and the seat of Zvolen District. It is also a major transport hub, being one of the four principal railway junctions in Slovakia (together with Bratislava, Košice, and Žilina).

== Geography ==
Zvolen lies in the Zvolenská kotlina (Zvolen Basin) at an altitude of 374 m (1,227 ft) above sea level. The city is situated at the confluence of the Hron and Slatina rivers. The Hron flows from the east, while the Slatina joins it from the south. The strategic location at the river confluence has historically made it a natural crossroads for trade routes.

The surrounding mountain ranges – Poľana (1,458 m), Kremnické vrchy, Javorie, and Štiavnické vrchy – form a protective ring around the basin and provide abundant forest resources. The city's territory is largely flat in the centre but rises towards the outlying hills, including the prominent Pustý hrad hill (421 m).

Zvolen is approximately 193 km (120 mi) by road from the capital Bratislava and about 206 km (128 mi) from Košice, the largest city in eastern Slovakia.

=== Geology and hydrology ===
The Zvolen Basin is a tectonic depression filled with Neogene and Quaternary sediments. The Hron River, one of Slovakia's longest rivers, flows through the city from east to west before turning south. Its tributary, the Slatina, drains the Poľana massif. The confluence area has rich groundwater resources, which historically supported agriculture and early settlement. Several smaller streams – Zolná and Neresnica – also flow through the city's outskirts.

The basin's alluvial plains are composed of gravel, sand, and loess, making the soil moderately fertile. To the north-east, volcanic formations from the Poľana stratovolcano create a distinctive landscape of ridges and calderas.

=== Protected areas ===
The Poľana Protected Landscape Area (PLA) begins immediately east of Zvolen. It is a UNESCO Biosphere Reserve known for its primeval forests, endemic plant species, and diverse bird populations. The PLA includes the Poľana mountain itself (1,458 m), an eroded stratovolcano with a caldera, and its administration is seated in Zvolen. The area around Zvolen is also part of the Natura 2000 network, protecting habitats for the European otter, lynx, and lesser spotted eagle.

=== Climate ===
Zvolen has a humid continental climate (Köppen: Dfb), with four distinct seasons. Summers are warm, winters cold and snowy. The average annual temperature is approximately 8.5 °C, and annual precipitation ranges from 600 to 750 mm, with the highest rainfall occurring in June and July.

Climate data for Zvolen (1991–2020 normals)
Month	Jan	Feb	Mar	Apr	May	Jun	Jul	Aug	Sep	Oct	Nov	Dec	Year
Mean daily maximum °C (°F)	1.6 (34.9)	4.3 (39.7)	9.9 (49.8)	16.5 (61.7)	21.3 (70.3)	24.8 (76.6)	26.9 (80.4)	26.9 (80.4)	21.2 (70.2)	14.7 (58.5)	7.7 (45.9)	2.1 (35.8)	14.8 (58.7)
Mean daily minimum °C (°F)	−5.7 (21.7)	−4.9 (23.2)	−1.1 (30.0)	3.2 (37.8)	7.9 (46.2)	11.4 (52.5)	12.9 (55.2)	12.5 (54.5)	8.5 (47.3)	4.3 (39.7)	0.3 (32.5)	−3.9 (25.0)	3.8 (38.8)
Average precipitation mm (inches)	36.8 (1.45)	38.4 (1.51)	40.5 (1.59)	48.3 (1.90)	76.4 (3.01)	88.2 (3.47)	96.4 (3.80)	73.6 (2.90)	65.1 (2.56)	56.2 (2.21)	52.5 (2.07)	45.2 (1.78)	717.6 (28.25)
Source: WMO

== Etymology ==
The name is of Slovak (Slavic) origin, meaning "the chosen one, splendid, excellent". The Hungarian Zólyom and the German Sohl were derived from the Latinized form Zolium (earliest mention 1135). The Latinized name Zolium is derived from the Latin solium, meaning "throne". An adjective "Old" (German: Altsohl, Slovak: Starý Zvolen, Latin: Antiquum or Vetus Solium) distinguish Zvolen from Banská Bystrica (German: Neusohl meaning New Zvolen).

== History ==
Historical affiliations

Kingdom of Hungary 1000 – 1526
John Zápolya's Eastern Hungarian Kingdom 1526 – 1551 (Ottoman vassal)
Kuruc rebellion 1672 – 1682 (Ottoman-backed)
Imre Thököly's Principality of Upper Hungary (Ottoman vassal) 1682 – 1686
Francis II Rákóczi's insurrection 1703 – 1711
Kingdom of Hungary (crownland of the Austrian Empire) 1804 – 1867
Austro-Hungarian Empire 1867 – 1918
Czechoslovakia 1918–1938
Slovak Republic 1938 – 1945
Czechoslovakia 1945–1992
Slovakia 1993–present

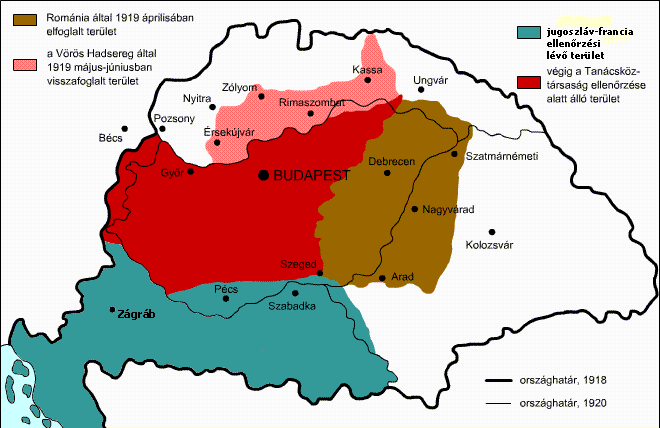
Slovak Soviet Republic in 1919, showing Zvolen (Zólyom) on map

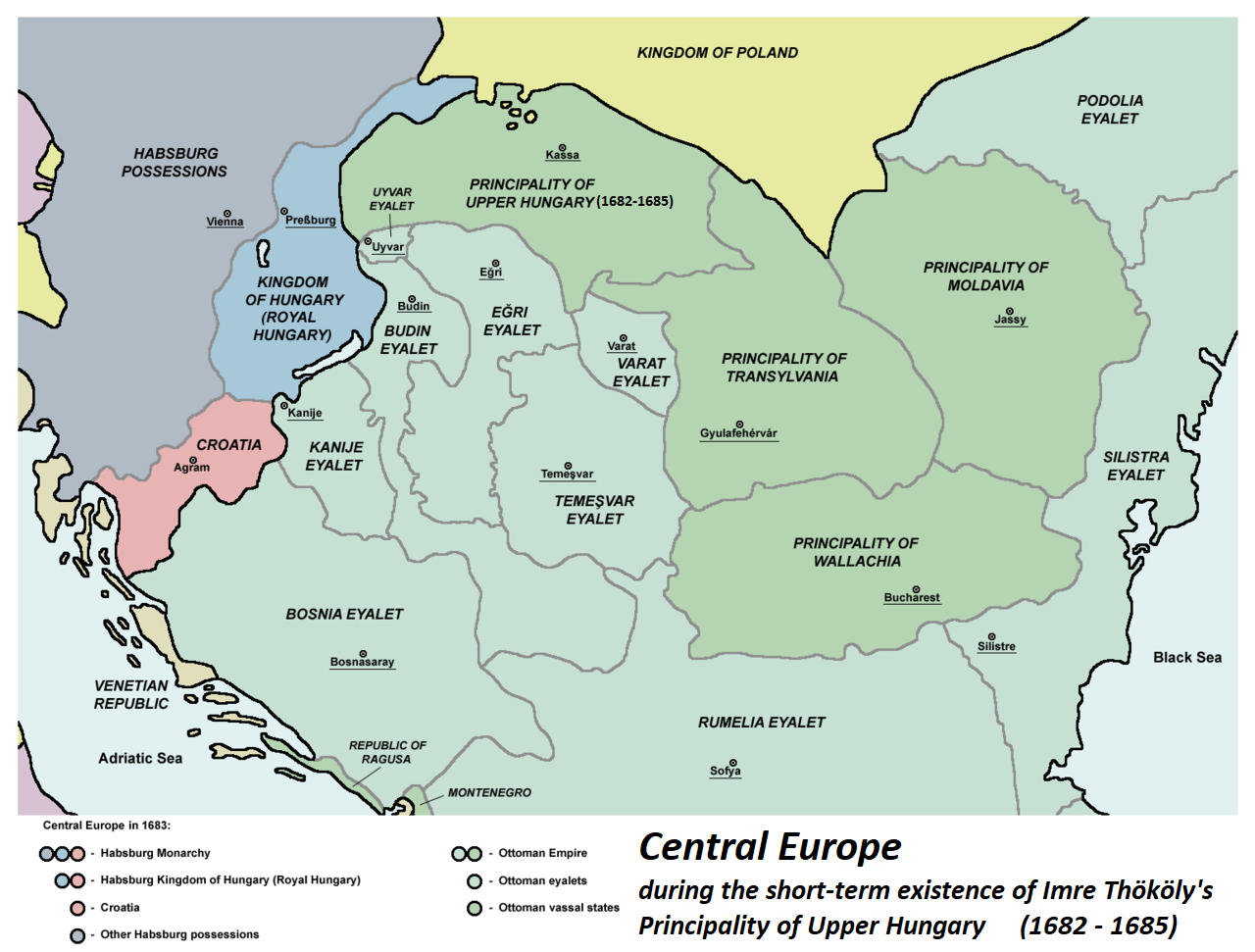
Part of the Ottoman Empire in 1683, including the Principality of Upper Hungary

=== Early history ===
The area of Zvolen has been inhabited since the Paleolithic period, with the oldest evidence of human presence found at the sites of Bakova jama and Medzi hliniskami. The strategic hill of Pustý hrad (meaning "Deserted Castle") attracted settlers as early as the late Stone Age (Baden culture). Research has identified stone walls built during the Bronze Age and Iron Age, and excavations unearthed precious artifacts, including several large bronze treasures of the Lusatian culture. In the 9th century, a Slavic settlement (today the Môťová neighborhood) became a regional center of what is now central Slovakia. The subsequent Slavic medieval castle was founded in the 9th century and was later incorporated into the Kingdom of Hungary, becoming the seat of Zólyom County.

=== Medieval period ===
In the 11th and 12th centuries, Pustý hrad was constructed and became one of the largest medieval castles in Europe, covering an area of over 76,000 m². The original settlement of Zvolen, built under the castle, lay on an important trade route known as the Via Magna, which connected Buda with Kraków. The strategic location at the crossroads of the Hron and Slatina rivers made it an ideal point for controlling trade and collecting tolls.

Zvolen was granted town privileges by King Béla IV in 1238, making it one of the first towns in the Kingdom of Hungary to receive such rights. The original charter was destroyed during the Mongol invasion of 1241. On 28 December 1243, the king issued a new charter, confirming and restoring the town's liberties. These privileges were granted to the local Slavic population, not to German settlers (hospites), indicating that Slavs still formed a significant majority in the town at that time.

The town gradually developed a typical medieval layout with a large elongated main square, the Church of St. Elizabeth from the first half of the 13th century, and a cemetery in its central part.

==== Zvolen Castle and the royal wedding of 1385 ====
Later, King Louis I the Great built a new Zvolen Castle between 1360 and 1382. The castle was inspired by Italian castles of the fourteenth century and originally served as a hunting residence for the Hungarian kings. It is one of the few Gothic castles designed primarily for comfortable living with minimal strategic or defensive significance, as it was located in the safe hinterland of Hungary at the time of its creation.

The future queen regnant Mary of Hungary (daughter of Louis I) and Emperor Sigismund of Luxembourg celebrated their wedding at Zvolen Castle in 1385. Sigismund, who was only 16 or 17 years old at the time, went on to become one of the most influential rulers of the late Middle Ages – Holy Roman Emperor, King of Hungary, Germany, and Bohemia. The castle later served as a frequent residence for Sigismund, who had a strong personal connection to Zvolen. In 1408, after the death of Queen Mary, Sigismund married Barbara of Cilli (Barbara Celjská), daughter of Hermann II, Count of Cilli. Barbara was crowned Queen of Hungary, Germany and Bohemia, and was actively involved in state affairs; during Sigismund's absences she served several times as regent of Hungary. Sigismund retained his close ties to Zvolen throughout his reign.

In the 15th century, the castle became the property of Hungarian queens. From 1440 to 1462, the powerful Czech mercenary leader John Jiskra of Brandýs – one of the most influential commanders in the Kingdom of Hungary – held the castle as his residence and made it a centre of his military operations. The castle was also often visited by King Matthias Corvinus (Matej Korvín), who, together with his wife Beatrice, used it as a manor from 1490.

=== Early modern period ===
In the first half of the 16th century, as a result of the growing threat from the Ottoman Empire, the castle underwent a major Renaissance reconstruction. Fortifications, an entrance gate and two additional storeys were added, transforming it into a defensive stronghold. From 1575, a permanent military garrison headed by the Lord Lieutenants of Zvolen County was stationed at the castle. The Ottoman expansion also led to the construction of town fortifications around Zvolen, which determined the ground plan of the town including its unusually spacious rectangular main square.

Zvolen remained the capital of Zólyom County until the 1760s.

==== Rákóczi's War of Independence – Battle of Zvolen (1703) ====
During Rákóczi's War of Independence (1703–1711), Zvolen was the site of a significant military engagement. On 15 November 1703, the Battle of Zvolen (also known as the Battle of Zólyom) took place near the town. A Kuruc (Hungarian rebel) army of approximately 15,000 men under General Miklós Bercsényi defeated the forces of the Habsburg monarchy, which included Austrian troops, Danish mercenaries, and Vojvodinian Serbs. The victory strengthened the rebel cause, and the Habsburg commander Simon Forgách later switched sides to the Kurucs in 1704.

=== 19th century ===
In the 19th century, Zvolen became a centre of the Slovak national revival. Ľudovít Štúr, the leader of the Slovak national movement and codifier of the modern Slovak language, served as a member of the Hungarian Diet (Diet of Hungary) with Zvolen as his constituency from 1847 to 1848.

The city's modernization accelerated with the arrival of the railway. On 18 June 1871, the railway line from Lučenec to Zvolen was opened, followed by the line from Zvolen to Vrútky on 12 August 1872. These connections transformed Zvolen into one of the four major railway junctions in Slovakia (together with Bratislava, Košice and Žilina) and turned the city into an important industrial centre.

=== World War II and the Slovak National Uprising ===
During World War II, Zvolen became a focal point of the Slovak National Uprising (SNP) in 1944. In the second half of 1943, a revolutionary National Committee was formed in the city, conducting illegal activities such as providing weapons, explosives, and funds for the uprising.

After the outbreak of the SNP on 29 August 1944, Zvolen Castle served as the headquarters of the 2nd Czechoslovak Partisan Brigade and as a hospital for the insurgents. The city's railway workshops played a crucial role: they built three armoured trains for the uprising. The most famous of these were the Hurban and Štefánik.

The Štefánik armoured train was constructed between 4 and 18 September 1944. It was equipped with a 75mm Czechoslovak mountain cannon, two 37mm cannons in two tank carriages (LT vz. 35), and 10 machine guns. Its crew consisted of 70 men. The train saw its first action on 27 September 1944 near Hronská Dúbrava and Stará Kremnička, fighting against advancing German forces. It also fought successfully at Žiar nad Hronom and Krupina, where it engaged the SS Schill unit. On 25 October 1944, after a German attack, it left Zvolen as the last train and moved to Banská Bystrica.

The Hurban armoured train was completed on 25 September 1944. It was the last armoured train used in the Slovak National Uprising. With a crew of 71 men, it was armed with an 8cm field gun, four 37mm guns, and 11 heavy machine guns. Between 23–24 October 1944, the Hurban became the main factor in the fight for the upper flow of the Hron river, repulsing attacks by the 18th SS Division "Horst Wessel". A replica of the Hurban is now displayed as a monument in a park next to Zvolen Castle, and an original preserved machine gun carriage is at the Museum of the Slovak National Uprising in Banská Bystrica.

German occupation forces captured the centre of the uprising on 27 October 1944, forcing the insurgents to retreat into the mountains.

==== Holocaust atrocities ====
Following the occupation, a series of mass atrocities took place. The German Einsatzkommando 14, based in Zvolen, carried out multiple mass shootings at the Jewish cemetery. Between March 29 and April 1, 1945, after the front had passed through Zvolen, six mass graves were officially opened at the cemetery. They contained the bodies of 128 victims (86 men, 36 women and 6 children). All of them had been killed by a shot to the back of the head and were victims of Einsatzkommando 14, which operated in the Zvolen district between November 1944 and February 1945. The commandant was SS-Obersturmführer Johannes Hoßbach.

Among the identified victims were at least 35 Romani men, women, and children from nearby villages (Podpoľanie region). Several Romani families from Dúbravy, Detva, Očová, Hriňová, Podkriváň and Vígľaš were murdered. After the war, exhumations took place and the bodies were identified by loved ones. A memorial stone on the Jewish cemetery now commemorates both the Jewish and Romani victims. A separate Roma memorial (inscribed "Ma bisteren!" – "Let us not forget!") was erected in 2015, and a plaque with the names of the murdered Roma from Podpoľanie was later added. Nearby, the "Noble Souls Park" (Park ušľachtilých duší) was opened in 2010; it is dedicated to Slovaks who helped Jews escape during the Holocaust. Its features include a glass Obelisk of Hope and the Way of Humility, which symbolises Jewish graves and the deportation method used to send Jews to their deaths.

Zvolen was liberated on 14 March 1945 by the Soviet and Romanian armies.

=== Post-war period ===
After the war, Zvolen continued to develop as an important industrial and transportation hub. In 1952, the College of Forestry and Wood Technology was founded, which later became the Technical University in Zvolen in 1991. The town square was modernized in 2002, becoming a popular spot for tourists and a venue for winter festivities.

An airport in nearby Sliač used to offer direct flights to Prague, but has been used exclusively by the military since 2021.

== Population ==
Historical population
Year	Pop.	±%
1970	26,586	—
1980	35,103	+32.0%
1991	41,984	+19.6%
2001	43,789	+4.3%
2011	43,318	−1.1%
2021	40,637	−6.2%
Source: Censuses

Population statistic (10 years)
Year	1995	2005	2015	2025
Count	44,328	43,147	42,868	38,747
Difference		−2.66%	−0.64%	−9.61%

Population statistic
Year	2024	2025
Count	39,175	38,747
Difference		−1.09%

It has a population of 38,747 people (31 December 2025).

=== Ethnicity ===
Census 2021 (1+ %)
Ethnicity	Number	Fraction
Slovak	36,387	89.54%
Not found out	3606	8.87%
Czech	433	1.06%
Total	40,637	

In year 2021 was 40,637 people by ethnicity 36,387 as Slovak, 3606 as Not found out, 433 as Czech, 287 as Romani, 222 as Hungarian, 160 as Other, 82 as Rusyn, 67 as Ukrainian, 57 as Russian, 45 as Vietnamese, 41 as Polish, 34 as German, 21 as Moravian, 18 as Chinese, 17 as Jewish, 15 as Italian, 15 as Romanian, 14 as Turkish, 12 as Serbian, 12 as Croatian, 11 as Bulgarian, 8 as French, 5 as Irish, 5 as Austrian, 4 as English, 3 as Canadian, 3 as Albanian, 1 as Iranian and 1 as Greek.

Note on population: The difference values of population numbers in the table "Population statistic" and in the sections "Ethnicity" & "Religion" is caused by the use of various statistical methods.

=== Religion ===
Census 2021 (1+ %)
Religion	Number	Fraction
Roman Catholic Church	16,125	39.68%
None	15,184	37.36%
Evangelical Church	4181	10.29%
Not found out	3580	8.81%
Total	40,637	

In year 2021 was 40,637 people by religion 16,125 from Roman Catholic Church, 15,184 from None, 4181 from Evangelical Church, 3580 from Not found out, 371 from Greek Catholic Church, 155 from Ad hoc movements, 137 from Jehovah's Witnesses, 136 from Christian Congregations in Slovakia, 123 from Other, 122 from Eastern Orthodox Church, 113 from Other and not ascertained christian church, 88 from Buddhism, 49 from Paganism and natural spirituality, 46 from Calvinist Church, 42 from Apostolic Church, 38 from Islam, 38 from Seventh-day Adventist Church, 29 from United Methodist Church, 19 from Jewish community, 19 from Baptists Church, 12 from Hinduism, 11 from Old Catholic Church, 9 from Church of the Brethren, 7 from Czechoslovak Hussite Church, 2 from Church of Jesus Christ of Latter-day Saints and 1 from Bahá'i Community.

== Culture ==
=== Castles ===
Zvolen's paramount landmark, the Zvolenský zámok Castle, stands as a significant symbol of the city's historical and cultural heritage. Within its historic walls, the Slovak National Gallery houses a distinguished collection of art ranging from the Gothic period to the modern era, offering visitors an immersive journey through artistic development. Since 1974, the castle’s courtyard has also hosted Zámocké hry zvolenské, a renowned annual outdoor professional theatre festival. This cultural tradition highlights the castle’s important role as a center of artistic expression and community engagement in the region.

The oldest castle in Zvolen is Pustý hrad Castle. Covering an area of over four hectares, it ranks among the most extensive castle ruins not only in Slovakia but also in Central Europe. Due to the largely concealed state of the preserved ruins from the city of Zvolen, a portion of the hill of Horný hrad was cleared of trees. Currently, it is possible not only to observe the castle walls' remnants from Zvolen but also to enjoy the panoramic view of the Zvolenská kotlina basin and the surrounding mountain ranges from Pustý hrad.

=== Churches ===
The dominant feature of the main town square in the city center is the isolated building of the Roman-Catholic parish Church of St. Elizabeth from the 14th century. The building was later modified in the late Gothic style around the year 1500, and subsequently in the 16th century and the 18th century in the Baroque style.

Another important church is the Lutheran St. Trinity Church. A single-nave originally late Baroque building with a polygonally terminated chancel and a protruding tower from the year 1784. In the years 1856-1857, a tower was built according to the project of František Mikša.

=== Theatre ===
The Professional Theatre in central Zvolen commenced operations in 1949 under the name Stredoslovenské divadlo. It was reportedly chosen as one of the region's established institutions due to its contributions during the Slovak National Uprising and to bolster the cultural and industrial fabric of the city. Since 1954, the institution has been known as the Jozef Gregor Theatre.

=== Festivals and Events ===
Zvolen hosts a number of regular festivals and events. The Zvolen Castle Games (Zámocké hry zvolenské) is an annual professional theatre festival held in the castle courtyard.

=== Trains ===
The dominating feature of the eastern part of the town centre is the model of the Hurban armoured train as a memorial to the Slovak National Uprising, which is situated in the park between the Castle and the main Zvolen osobná railway station. It was manufactured in 1944 in the railway workshops of Zvolen.

The Historic Technology Club at Zvolen's Locomotive Depot is a non-profit organization founded in 1998. It's dedicated to preserving railway history and showcasing historic vehicles through events like nostalgic rides and exhibitions. The club has restored various locomotives and expanded the museum vehicle park. It also co-organizes the annual Grand Prix steam locomotive races in Zvolen.

== Sport ==
=== Ice Hockey ===
The ice hockey club HKM Zvolen is the third most successful hockey club in Slovakia. It plays in Slovakia's highest league, the Slovak Extraliga, and has won three titles in 2001, 2012, and 2021. Another noteworthy achievement is winning the IIHF Continental Cup in 2005. Since 1965, their home has been the Zvolen Ice Stadium, which has a capacity of 5,345 spectators.

The Slovak Women's Ice Hockey Extraliga is played by the local club ŽHKm Zvolen, which is a female alternative of the HKM Zvolen.

=== Football ===
The football club MFK Zvolen is a Slovak football team, based in the town of Zvolen. The club was established in 1902. The club plays home matches at MFK Zvolen Stadium in Zvolen, which has a capacity of 1,870 spectators. As of the 2022/2023 season, it competes in the Slovak Third League (West), the third-tier of Slovak football.

== Education ==
=== Technická univerzita vo Zvolene ===
The higher degree college was founded in 1952 and initially named the College of Forestry and Wood Technology. In 1991, it attained university status and underwent a name change to become the Technical University in Zvolen. It is a member of the European Forest Institute.

In the field of education, it fulfills its mission in study programs such as forestry, wood processing, ecology, and environmental studies, production engineering, as well as in related artistic, economic, natural science, and technical fields, with an emphasis on the representation of second and third-degree study programs, accreditation, and the implementation of programs in foreign languages.

The university has the following faculties:

- Faculty of Forestry
- Faculty of Ecology and Environmental Sciences
- Faculty of Wood Sciences and Technology
- Faculty of Environmental and Manufacturing Technology

== Economy ==
Zvolen is a significant industrial center in central Slovakia. Its strategic location as a railway junction has historically made it a hub for heavy industry.

The city is home to Železničné opravovne a strojárne Zvolen (ŽOS Zvolen), a major engineering company specializing in the repair, modernization, and maintenance of railway vehicles. The company was established in 1994, but its roots date back to the 19th century when the city became an important railway node. Another notable company is Schreiber Foods, which has a dairy production facility in Zvolen. The city also has a significant timber and wood processing industry, taking advantage of the surrounding forests. Other industrial sectors include automotive, clothing, and food production.

== Transport ==
The largest town in central Pohronie, Zvolen, boasts a highly convenient transportation location. Situated at the intersection of key national roadways (R1, R2) and significant railway routes of nationwide importance, it also enjoys proximity to the international Sliač Airport. This positioning enhances its accessibility and connectivity, making it a pivotal hub for transportation and commerce within the region.

The Zvolen Railway Junction is one of the four main establishment stations (Bratislava, Košice, Žilina, Zvolen) in the network of Slovak Railways (ŽSR). It comprises multiple stations and stops (Zvolen osobná railway station, Zvolen City Station, Zvolen Freight Station). The main station is a dual-aisle building inspired by ancient temples, featuring a colonnade and a large basilica-style glazing.

== Notable people ==
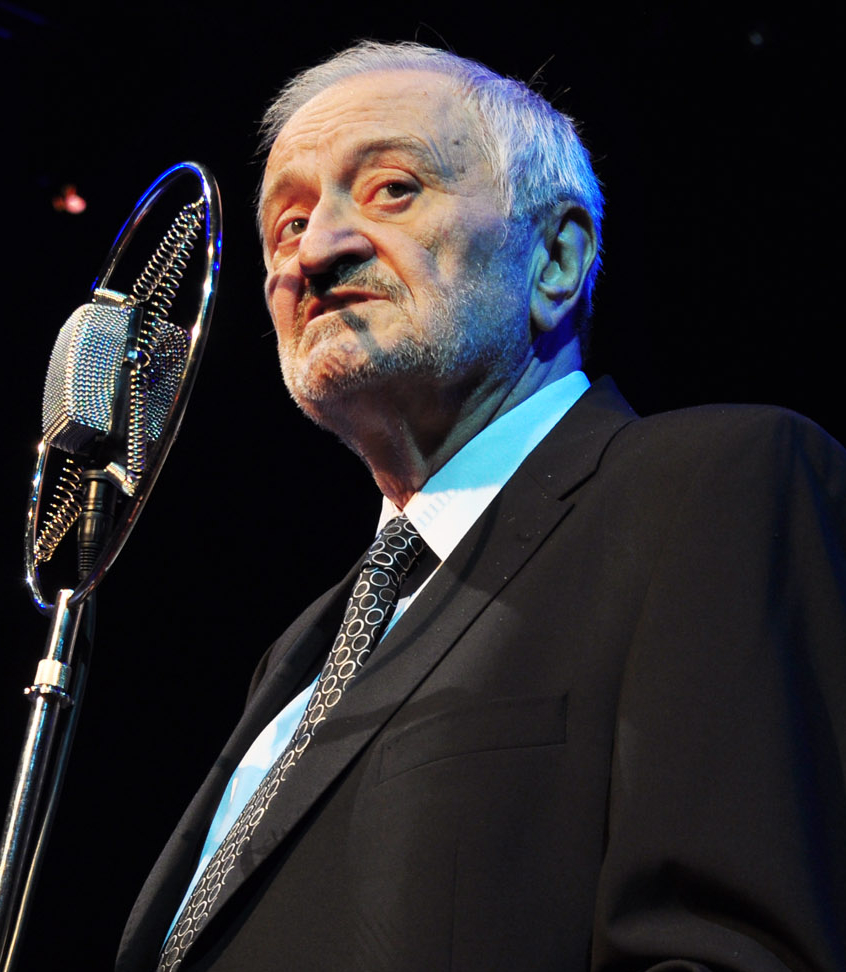
Milan Lasica

- Bálint Balassi (1554–1594), poet and nobleman
- Karol Beck (born 1982), tennis player
- Dagmar Bílková (born 1967), sport shooter
- Michal Chovan (born 1987), ice hockey player
- Jozef Cíger-Hronský (1896–1960), writer
- Dalibor Dvorský (born 2005), ice hockey player
- Marion Freschl (1896–1984), opera singer
- Mária Homolová (born 1987), artistic gymnast
- Rebeka Jančová (born 2003), alpine skier
- Elena Kaliská (born 1972), slalom canoeist
- Jozef Kucej (born 1965), athlete
- Milan Lasica (1940–2021), actor
- Ján Lašák (born 1979), ice hockey player
- Pavol Marcely (1914–1980), Slovak general
- Mária Mázorová (1928–2016), folklorist
- Vladimír Mečiar (born 1942), politician, three-time Prime Minister of Slovakia
- Miroslav Michalek (born 1965), ice hockey player and executive
- Ľudovít Štúr (1815–1856), politician, linguist, writer
- Rudolf Urc (1937–2026), dramaturg and director
- František Velecký (1936–2003), actor
- Peter Zuzin (born 1990), ice hockey player

== Twin towns – sister cities of Zvolen ==
Zvolen is a member of the Douzelage, a town twinning association of towns across the European Union. This active town twinning began in 1991, and there are regular events, such as a produce market from each of the other countries and festivals. As of 2019, its members are:

- Agros, Cyprus
- Altea, Spain
- Asikkala, Finland
- Bad Kötzting, Germany
- Bellagio, Italy
- (Republic of Ireland) Bundoran, Ireland
- Chojna, Poland
- Granville, France
- Holstebro, Denmark
- Houffalize, Belgium
- Judenburg, Austria
- Kőszeg, Hungary
- Marsaskala, Malta
- Meerssen, Netherlands
- Niederanven, Luxembourg
- Oxelösund, Sweden
- Preveza, Greece
- Rokiškis, Lithuania
- Rovinj, Croatia
- Sesimbra, Portugal
- Sherborne, England, United Kingdom
- Sigulda, Latvia
- Siret, Romania
- Škofja Loka, Slovenia
- Sušice, Czech Republic
- Tryavna, Bulgaria
- Türi, Estonia

Other twinnings

- Imatra, Finland
- Zwoleń, Poland
- Prachatice, Czech Republic
- Tótkomlós, Hungary
- Rivne, Ukraine

== Gallery ==
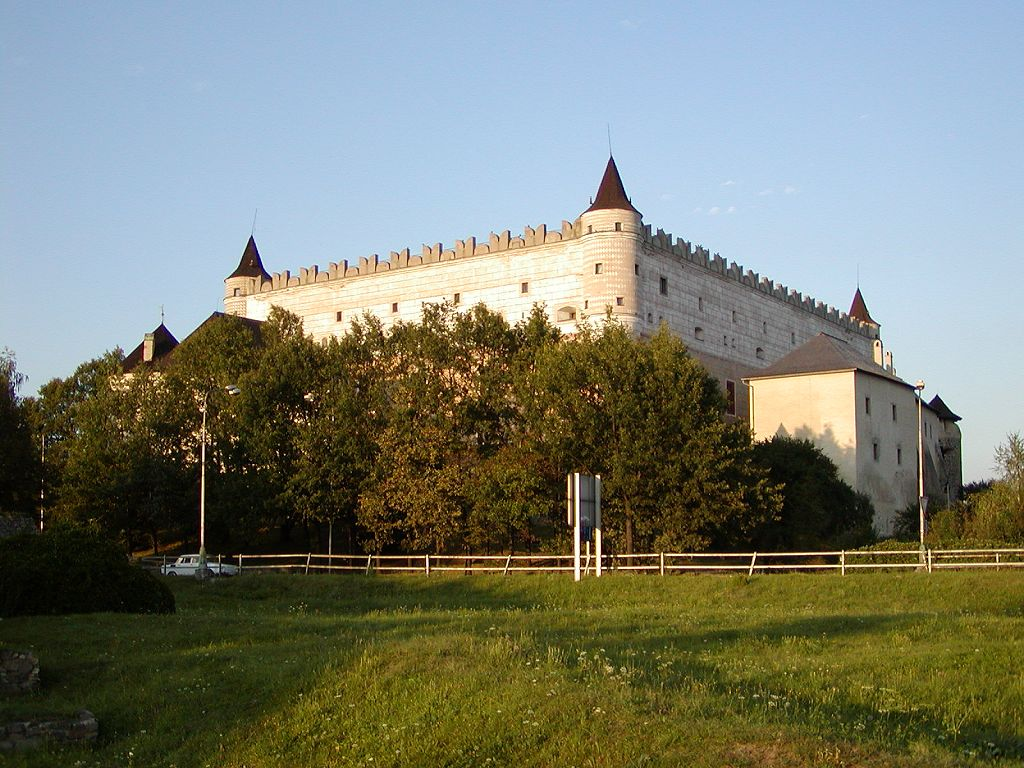
Zvolen Castle

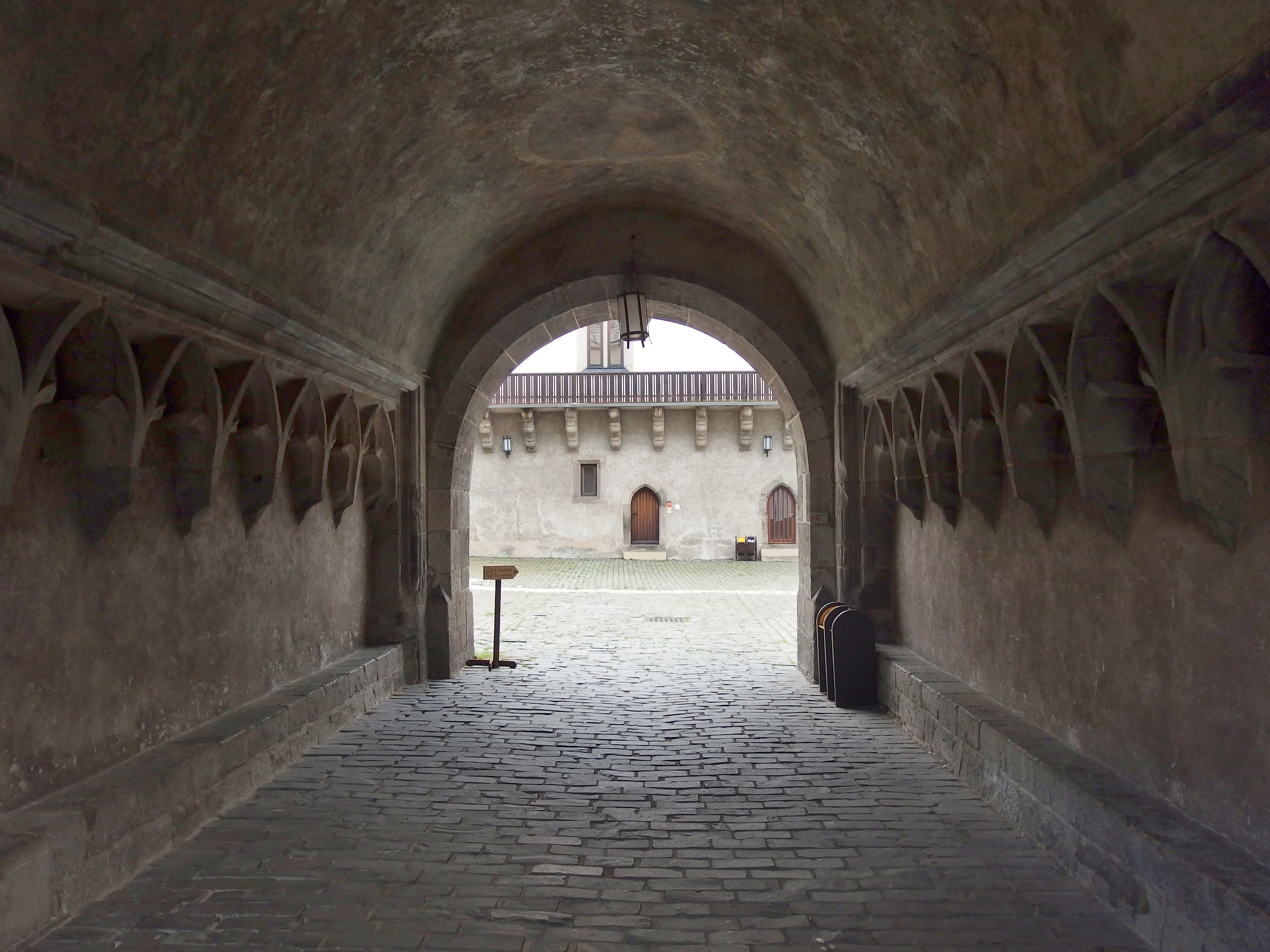

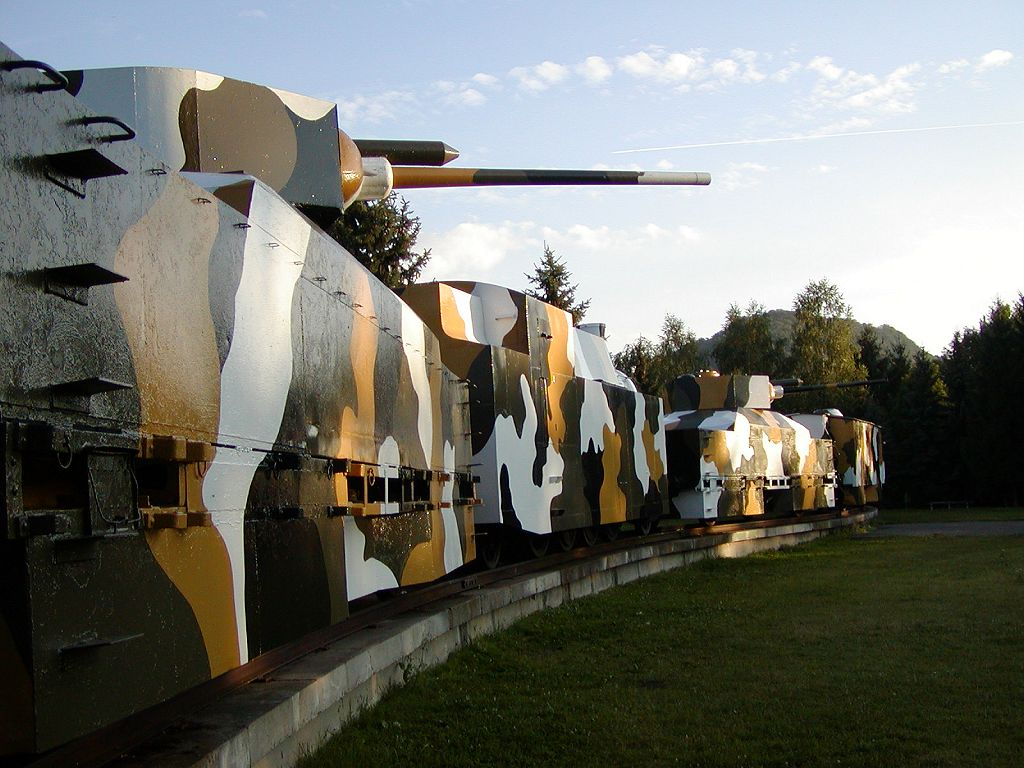
Armored train Hurban

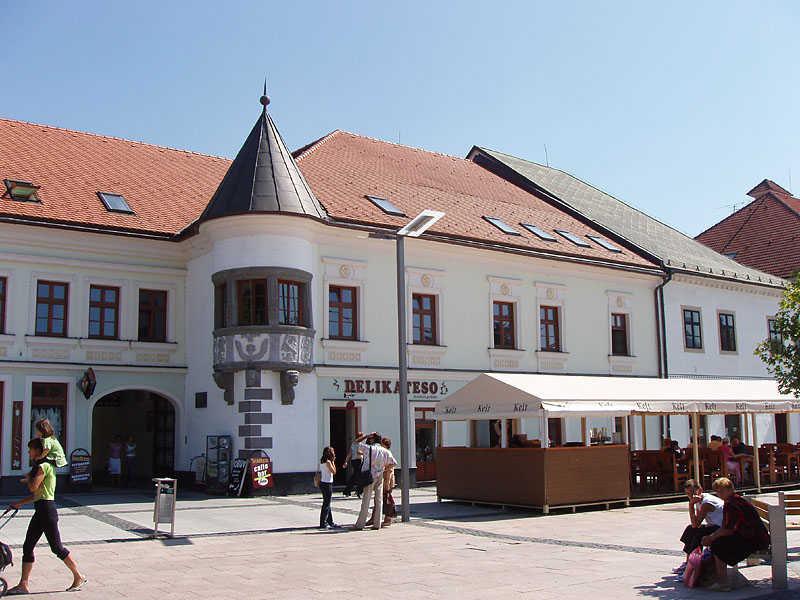
City centre of Zvolen

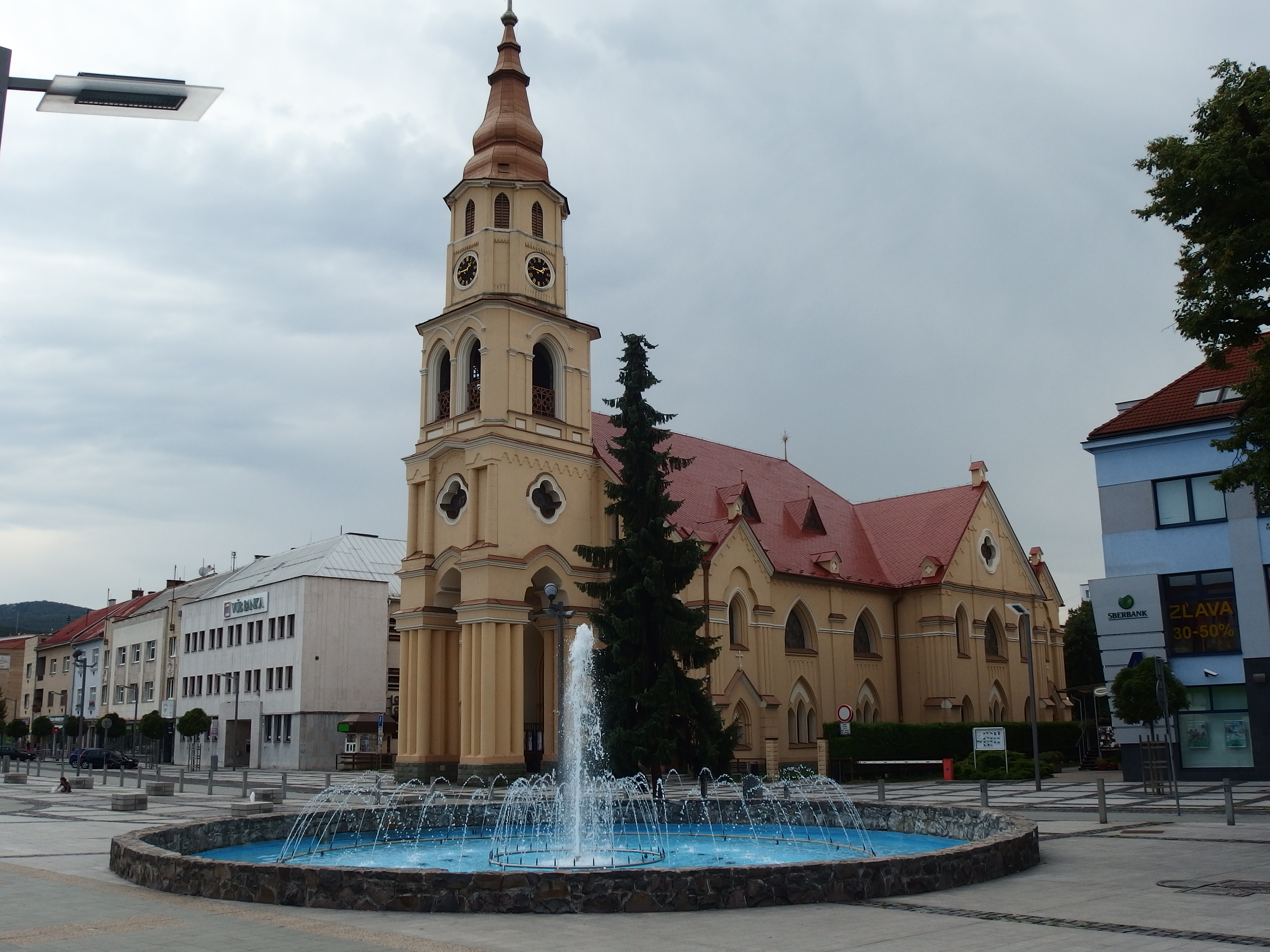

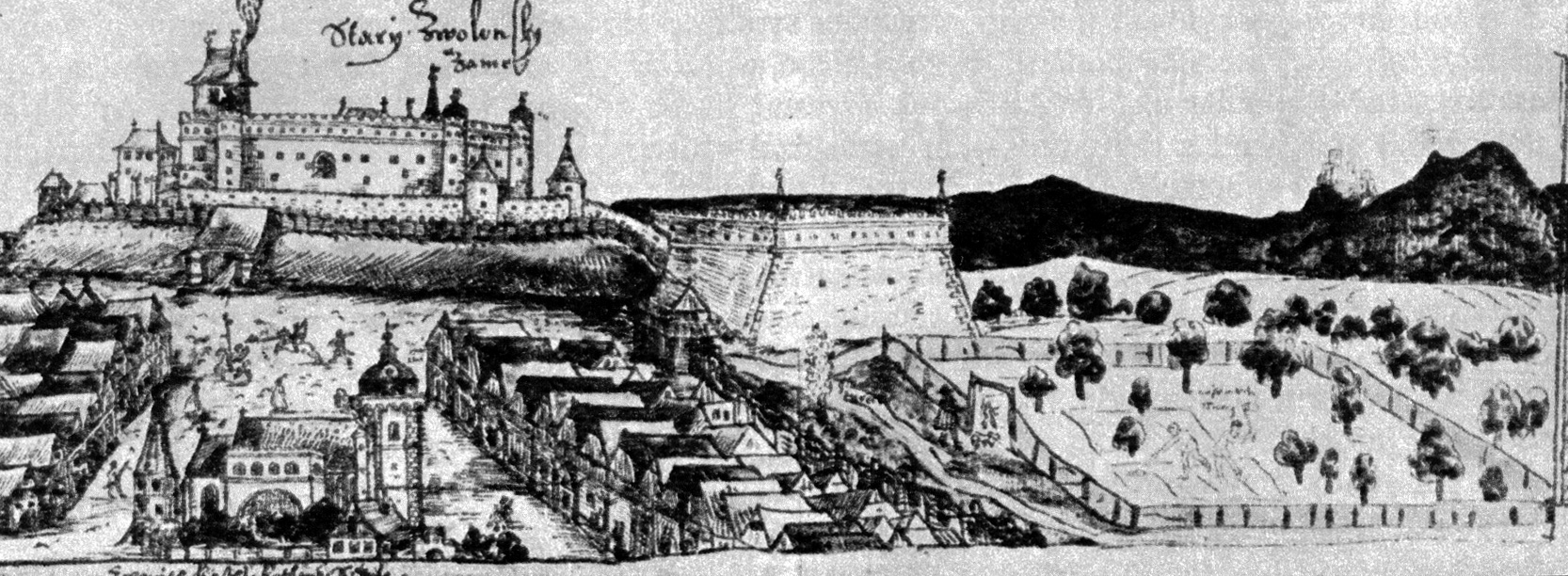
Zvolen in 1596

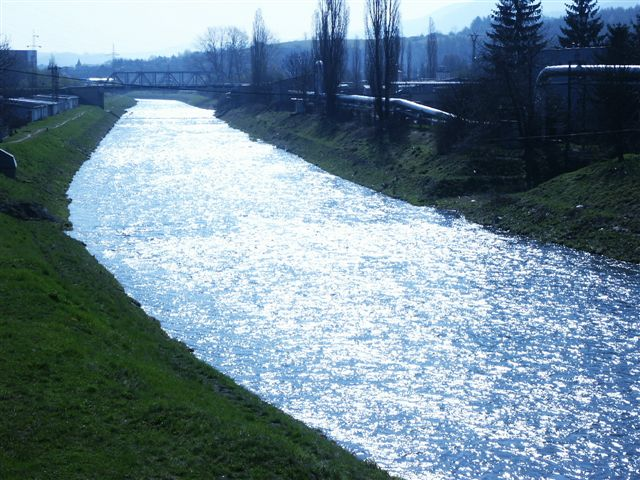
Slatina river in Zvolen
