= Dubovica, Slovakia =

Municipality of Slovakia

Dubovica
- Municipality
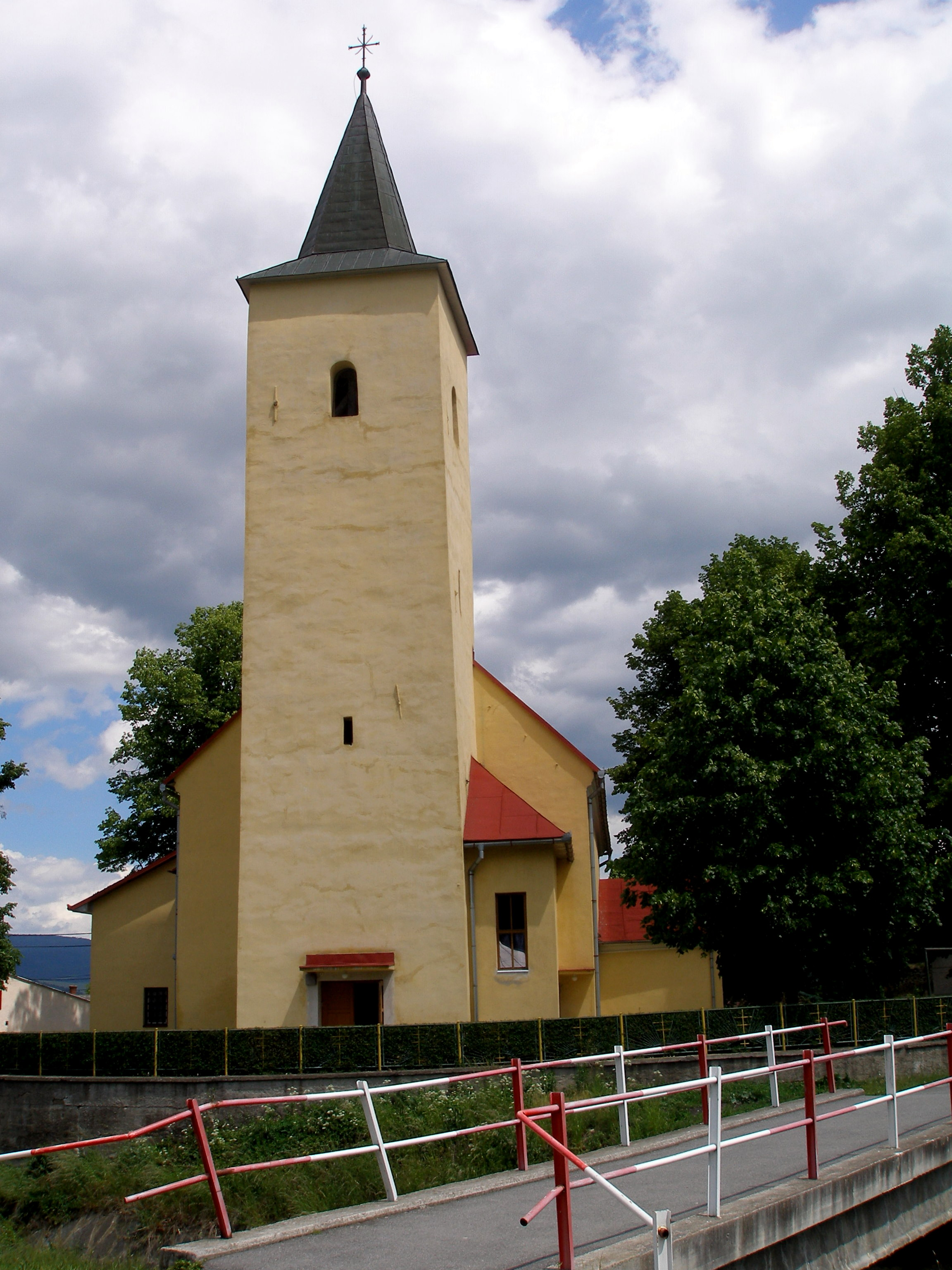

- Flag

- Location of Dubovica in the Prešov Region Location of Dubovica in Slovakia
- Coordinates: 49.13°N 20.97°E
- Country: Slovakia
- Region: Prešov Region
- District: Sabinov District
- First mentioned: 1278

Area
  - Total: 17.15 km^{2} (6.62 sq mi)
- Elevation: 415 m (1,362 ft)

Population (2025)
  - Total: 1,430
- Time zone: UTC+1 (CET)
  - Summer (DST): UTC+2 (CEST)
- Postal code: 827 1
- Area code: +421 51
- Vehicle registration plate (until 2022): SB
- Website: obecdubovica.sk

Dubovica is a village and municipality in the Sabinov District, located in the Prešov Region of north-eastern Slovakia.

== History ==
In historical records the village was first mentioned in 1278.

== Geography ==
The municipality lies at an altitude of 415 metres (1,362 ft) and covers an area of 17.15 km^{2} (6.62 sq mi) (2025).

== Population ==
Population statistic (10 years)
Year	1995	2005	2015	2025
Count	1449	1489	1481	1430
Difference		+2.76%	−0.53%	−3.44%

Population statistic
Year	2024	2025
Count	1430	1430
Difference		+0%

It has a population of 1430 people (31 December 2025).

=== Ethnicity ===
Census 2021 (1+ %)
Ethnicity	Number	Fraction
Slovak	1436	99.23%
Rusyn	15	1.03%
Total	1447	

In year 2021 was 1447 people by ethnicity 1436 as Slovak, 15 as Rusyn, 13 as Not found out, 4 as Czech, 3 as German, 2 as Other and 1 as Bulgarian.

Note on population: The difference values of population numbers in the table "Population statistic" and in the sections "Ethnicity" & "Religion" is caused by the use of various statistical methods.

=== Religion ===
Census 2021 (1+ %)
Religion	Number	Fraction
Roman Catholic Church	1317	91.02%
Greek Catholic Church	54	3.73%
None	50	3.46%
Total	1447	

In year 2021 was 1447 people by religion 1317 from Roman Catholic Church, 54 from Greek Catholic Church, 50 from None, 8 from Not found out, 4 from Calvinist Church, 4 from Other and not ascertained christian church, 4 from Evangelical Church, 2 from Eastern Orthodox Church, 2 from Ad hoc movements, 1 from Other and 1 from Apostolic Church.

== Genealogical resources ==
The records for genealogical research are available at Statny Archiv in Presov, Slovakia, the state archive.

- Roman Catholic church records (births/marriages/deaths): 1717-1895 (parish A)
- Greek Catholic church records (births/marriages/deaths): 1844-1951 (parish B)

== See also ==
- List of municipalities and towns in Slovakia
