= Daletice =

- Municipality
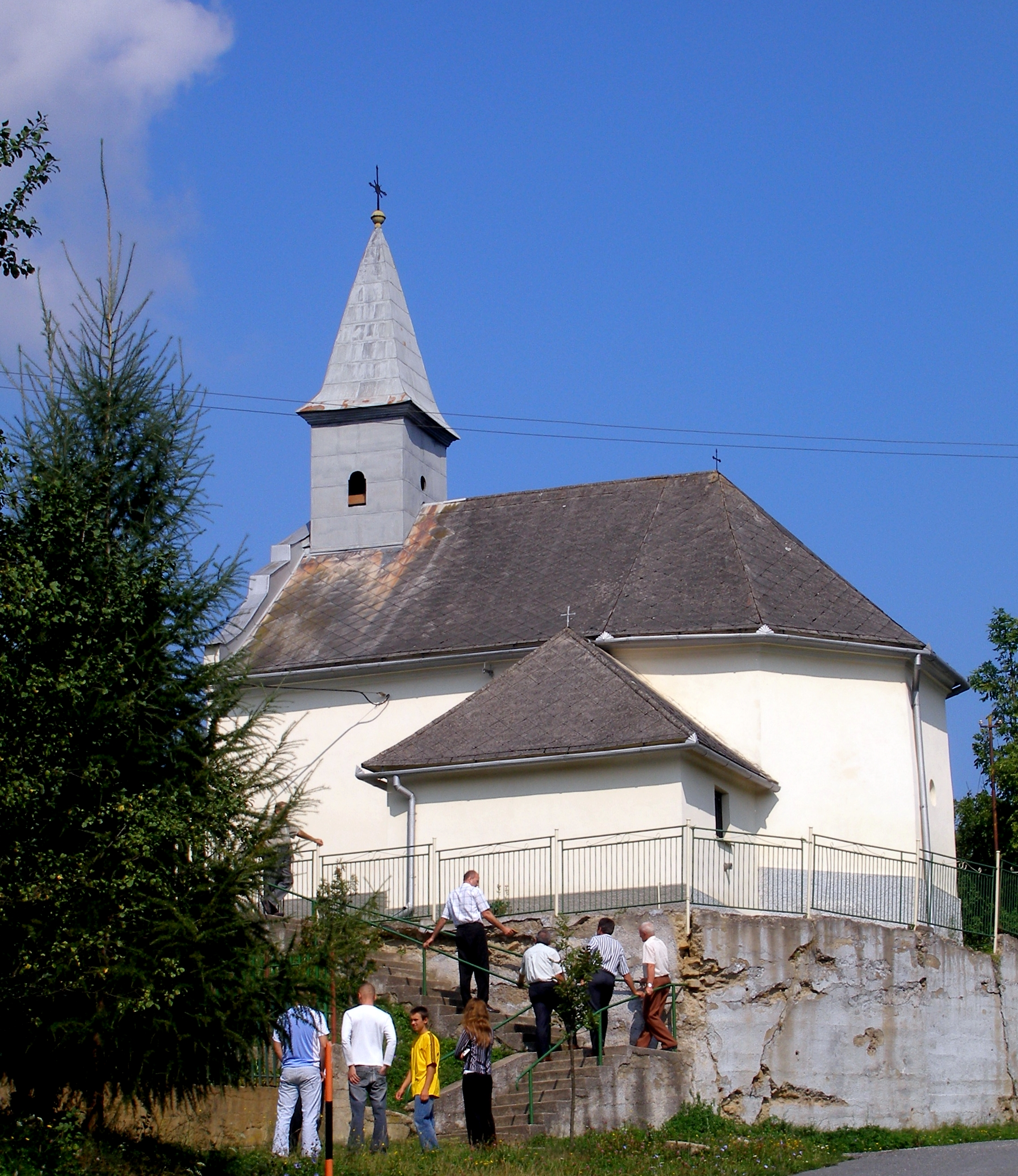

- Location of Daletice in the Prešov Region Location of Daletice in Slovakia
- Coordinates: 49.03°N 21.07°E
- Country: Slovakia
- Region: Prešov Region
- District: Sabinov District
- First mentioned: 1320

Area
  - Total: 2.48 km^{2} (0.96 sq mi)
- Elevation: 504 m (1,654 ft)

Population (2025)
  - Total: 98
- Time zone: UTC+1 (CET)
  - Summer (DST): UTC+2 (CEST)
- Postal code: 826 3
- Area code: +421 51
- Vehicle registration plate (until 2022): SB
- Website: www.daletice.sk

Daletice (Hungarian: Deléte) is a village and municipality in Sabinov District in the Prešov Region of north-eastern Slovakia.

== History ==
In historical records the village was first mentioned in 1320.

== Geography ==
The municipality lies at an altitude of 504 metres (1,654 ft) and covers an area of 2.48 km^{2} (0.96 sq mi) (2025).

== Population ==
Population statistic (10 years)
Year	1995	2005	2015	2025
Count	113	102	103	98
Difference		−9.73%	+0.98%	−4.85%

Population statistic
Year	2024	2025
Count	95	98
Difference		+3.15%

It has a population of 98 people (31 December 2025).

=== Ethnicity ===
Census 2021 (1+ %)
Ethnicity	Number	Fraction
Slovak	94	97.91%
Not found out	3	3.12%
Jewish	1	1.04%
Ukrainian	1	1.04%
Russian	1	1.04%
Total	96	

In year 2021 was 96 people by ethnicity 94 as Slovak, 3 as Not found out, 1 as Jewish, 1 as Ukrainian and 1 as Russian.

Note on population: The difference values of population numbers in the table "Population statistic" and in the sections "Ethnicity" & "Religion" is caused by the use of various statistical methods.

=== Religion ===
Census 2021 (1+ %)
Religion	Number	Fraction
Roman Catholic Church	69	71.88%
Evangelical Church	17	17.71%
None	5	5.21%
Greek Catholic Church	2	2.08%
Jewish community	1	1.04%
Not found out	1	1.04%
Seventh-day Adventist Church	1	1.04%
Total	96	

In year 2021 was 96 people by religion 69 from Roman Catholic Church, 17 from Evangelical Church, 5 from None, 2 from Greek Catholic Church, 1 from Jewish community, 1 from Not found out and 1 from Seventh-day Adventist Church.

== Genealogical resources ==
The records for genealogical research are available at the state archive "Statny Archiv in Presov, Slovakia"

- Roman Catholic church records (births/marriages/deaths): 1750-1896 (parish B)
- Greek Catholic church records (births/marriages/deaths): 1834-1895 (parish B)

== See also ==
- List of municipalities and towns in Slovakia
