= Uzovské Pekľany =

Village and municipality in Slovakia

- Municipality
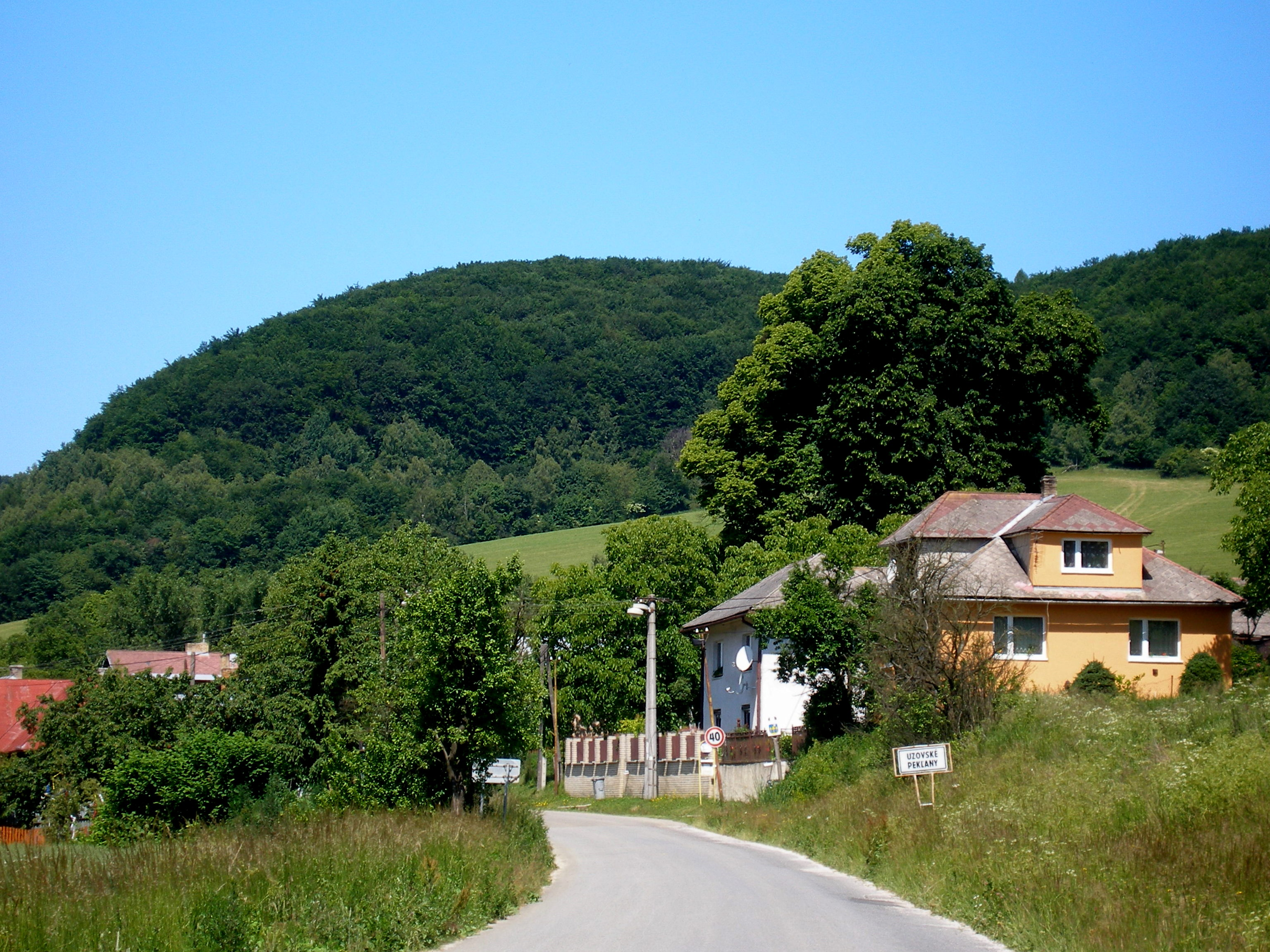

- Flag

- Location of Uzovské Pekľany in the Prešov Region Location of Uzovské Pekľany in Slovakia
- Coordinates: 49.08°N 21.03°E
- Country: Slovakia
- Region: Prešov Region
- District: Sabinov District
- First mentioned: 1337

Area
  - Total: 9.98 km^{2} (3.85 sq mi)
- Elevation: 480 m (1,570 ft)

Population (2025)
  - Total: 485
- Time zone: UTC+1 (CET)
  - Summer (DST): UTC+2 (CEST)
- Postal code: 826 2
- Area code: +421 51
- Vehicle registration plate (until 2022): SB
- Website: uzovskepeklany.sk/sk

Uzovské Pekľany is a village and municipality in Sabinov District in the Prešov Region of north-eastern Slovakia.

== History ==
In historical records the village was first mentioned in 1337.

== Geography ==
The municipality lies at an altitude of 480 metres (1,570 ft) and covers an area of 9.98 km^{2} (3.85 sq mi) (2025).

== Population ==
Population statistic (10 years)
Year	1995	2005	2015	2025
Count	369	374	441	485
Difference		+1.35%	+17.91%	+9.97%

Population statistic
Year	2024	2025
Count	480	485
Difference		+1.04%

It has a population of 485 people (31 December 2025).

=== Ethnicity ===
Census 2021 (1+ %)
Ethnicity	Number	Fraction
Slovak	454	96.18%
Romani	148	31.35%
Not found out	17	3.6%
Total	472	

In year 2021 was 472 people by ethnicity 454 as Slovak, 148 as Romani, 17 as Not found out, 2 as Polish, 1 as Ukrainian, 1 as Italian, 1 as Rusyn and 1 as Other.

Note on population: The difference values of population numbers in the table "Population statistic" and in the sections "Ethnicity" & "Religion" is caused by the use of various statistical methods.

=== Religion ===
Census 2021 (1+ %)
Religion	Number	Fraction
Roman Catholic Church	445	94.28%
None	10	2.12%
Not found out	8	1.69%
Greek Catholic Church	6	1.27%
Total	472	

In year 2021 was 472 people by religion 445 from Roman Catholic Church, 10 from None, 8 from Not found out, 6 from Greek Catholic Church, 2 from Eastern Orthodox Church and 1 from Christian Congregations in Slovakia.
