= Šarišské Dravce =

- Municipality
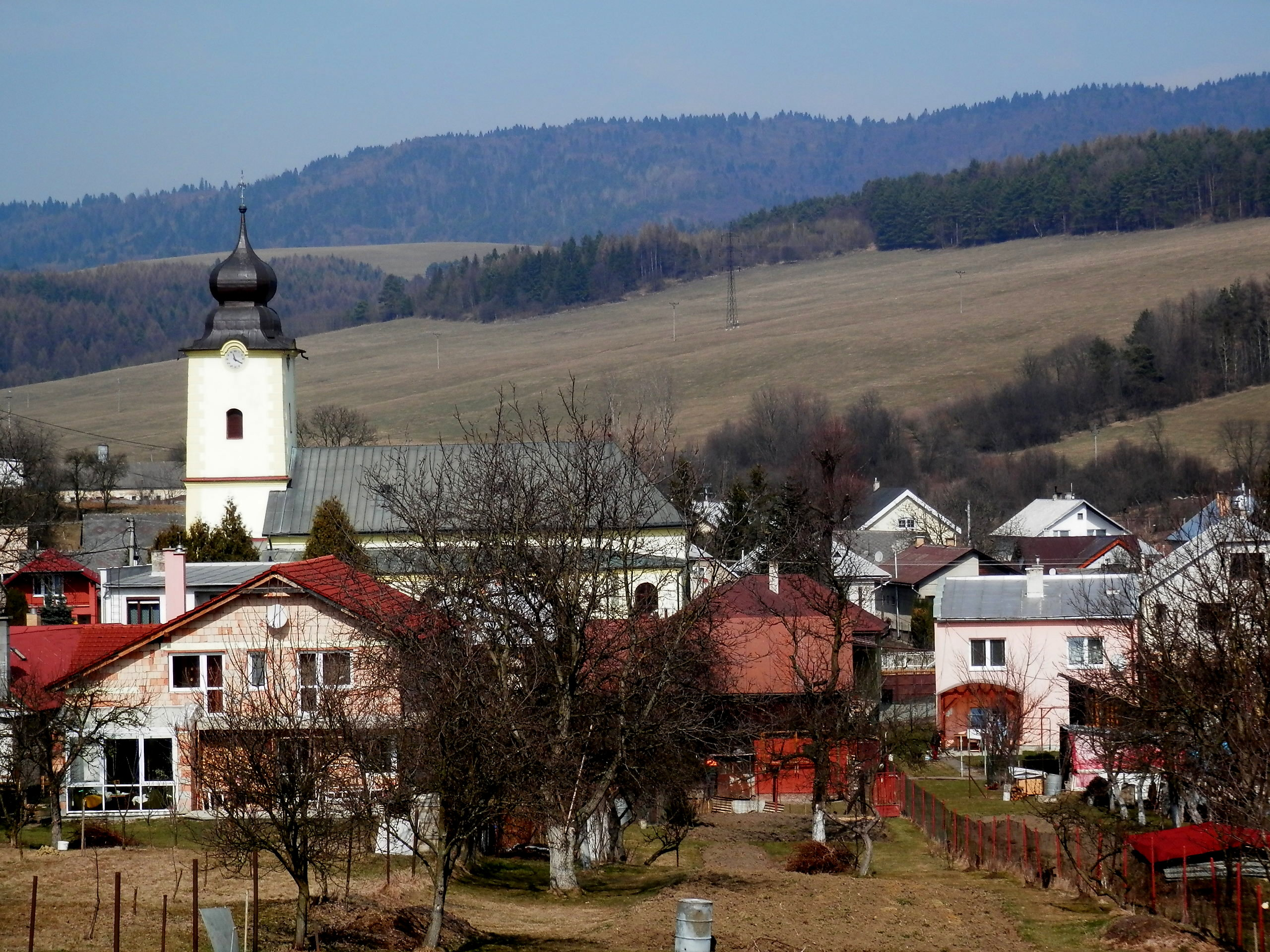

- Flag

- Location of Šarišské Dravce in the Prešov Region Location of Šarišské Dravce in Slovakia
- Coordinates: 49.17°N 20.87°E
- Country: Slovakia
- Region: Prešov Region
- District: Sabinov District
- First mentioned: 1295

Area
  - Total: 9.92 km^{2} (3.83 sq mi)
- Elevation: 468 m (1,535 ft)

Population (2025)
  - Total: 1,228
- Time zone: UTC+1 (CET)
  - Summer (DST): UTC+2 (CEST)
- Postal code: 827 3
- Area code: +421 51
- Vehicle registration plate (until 2022): SB
- Website: www.sardravce.sk

Šarišské Dravce (Hungarian: Daróc) is a village and municipality in Sabinov District in the Prešov Region of north-eastern Slovakia.

== History ==
In historical records the village was first mentioned in 1295.

== Geography ==
The municipality lies at an altitude of 468 metres (1,535 ft) and covers an area of 9.92 km^{2} (3.83 sq mi) (2025).

== Population ==
Population statistic (10 years)
Year	1995	2005	2015	2025
Count	1201	1260	1215	1228
Difference		+4.91%	−3.57%	+1.06%

Population statistic
Year	2024	2025
Count	1245	1228
Difference		−1.36%

It has a population of 1228 people (31 December 2025).

=== Ethnicity ===
Census 2021 (1+ %)
Ethnicity	Number	Fraction
Slovak	1194	98.11%
Not found out	23	1.88%
Total	1217	

In year 2021 was 1217 people by ethnicity 1194 as Slovak, 23 as Not found out, 9 as Rusyn, 4 as Czech, 2 as Other, 1 as German, 1 as Moravian and 1 as Hungarian.

Note on population: The difference values of population numbers in the table "Population statistic" and in the sections "Ethnicity" & "Religion" is caused by the use of various statistical methods.

=== Religion ===
Census 2021 (1+ %)
Religion	Number	Fraction
Roman Catholic Church	1139	93.59%
None	24	1.97%
Greek Catholic Church	19	1.56%
Not found out	16	1.31%
Total	1217	

In year 2021 was 1217 people by religion 1139 from Roman Catholic Church, 24 from None, 19 from Greek Catholic Church, 16 from Not found out, 7 from Christian Congregations in Slovakia, 3 from Ad hoc movements, 2 from Old Catholic Church, 2 from Evangelical Church, 1 from Other and not ascertained christian church, 1 from Islam, 1 from Other, 1 from Hinduism and 1 from Apostolic Church.
