= Bajerovce =

Municipality of Slovakia

- Municipality
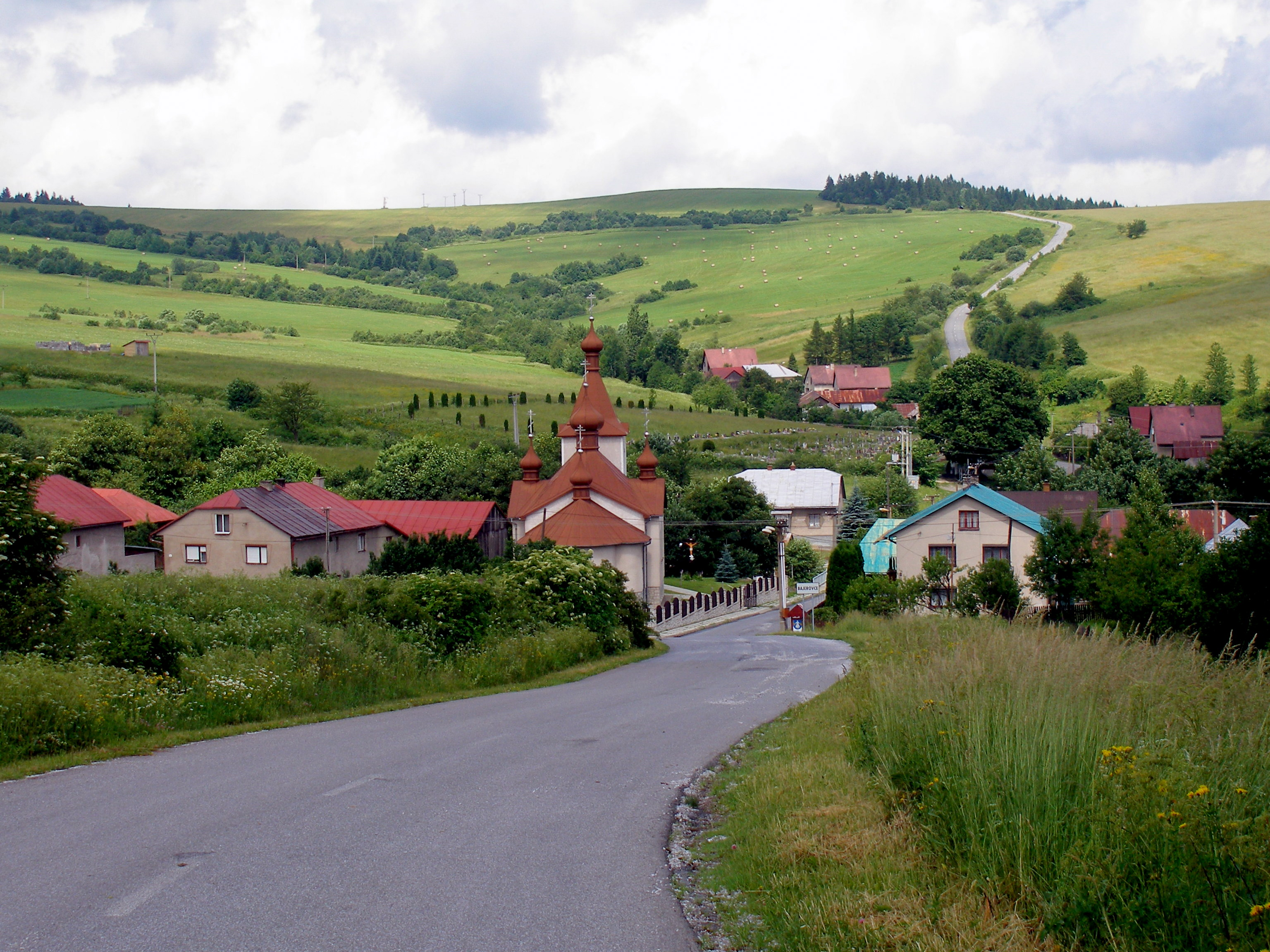

- Flag

- Location of Bajerovce in the Prešov Region Location of Bajerovce in Slovakia
- Coordinates: 49.22°N 20.80°E
- Country: Slovakia
- Region: Prešov Region
- District: Sabinov District
- First mentioned: 1366

Area
  - Total: 11.89 km^{2} (4.59 sq mi)
- Elevation: 665 m (2,182 ft)

Population (2025)
  - Total: 272
- Time zone: UTC+1 (CET)
  - Summer (DST): UTC+2 (CEST)
- Postal code: 827 3
- Area code: +421 51
- Vehicle registration plate (until 2022): SB
- Website: bajerovce.sk

Bajerovce (Hungarian: Bajorvágás, Rusyn: Баєрівцї) is a village and municipality in the Sabinov District in the Prešov Region of north-eastern Slovakia. In historical records, the village was first mentioned in 1366. Ruthenians, settled here in the 1570s, were the main inhabitants of the village in recent centuries. The municipality lies at an altitude of 679 metres and covers an area of 11.89 km^{2} (4.59 sq mi) (2025-06-30/-07-01). It has a population of about 354 people (293 Slovaks and 60 Ruthenians) in 2001.

== Geography ==
The municipality lies at an altitude of 665 metres (2,182 ft) and covers an area of 11.89 km^{2} (4.59 sq mi) (2025).

== Population ==
Population statistic (10 years)
| Year | 1995 | 2005 | 2015 | 2025 |
|---|---|---|---|---|
| Count | 383 | 313 | 295 | 272 |
| Difference | | −18.27% | −5.75% | −7.79% |

Population statistic
| Year | 2024 | 2025 |
|---|---|---|
| Count | 270 | 272 |
| Difference | | +0.74% |

It has a population of 272 people (31 December 2025).

=== Ethnicity ===
Census 2021 (1+ %)
| Ethnicity | Number | Fraction |
|---|---|---|
| Slovak | 207 | 73.66% |
| Rusyn | 202 | 71.88% |
| Not found out | 5 | 1.77% |
| Total | 281 | |

In year 2021 was 281 people by ethnicity 207 as Slovak, 202 as Rusyn, 5 as Not found out and 1 as Ukrainian.

Note on population: The difference values of population numbers in the table "Population statistic" and in the sections "Ethnicity" & "Religion" is caused by the use of various statistical methods.

=== Religion ===
Census 2021 (1+ %)
| Religion | Number | Fraction |
|---|---|---|
| Greek Catholic Church | 162 | 57.65% |
| Eastern Orthodox Church | 101 | 35.94% |
| Roman Catholic Church | 10 | 3.56% |
| Not found out | 3 | 1.07% |
| None | 3 | 1.07% |
| Total | 281 | |

In year 2021 was 281 people by religion 162 from Greek Catholic Church, 101 from Eastern Orthodox Church, 10 from Roman Catholic Church, 3 from Not found out, 3 from None, 1 from Evangelical Church and 1 from Ad hoc movements.

== Genealogical resources ==
The records for genealogical research are available at the state archive in Prešov (Slovak: Štátny archív v Prešove).

- Roman Catholic church records (births/marriages/deaths): 1753–1895
- Greek Catholic church records (births/marriages/deaths): 1825–1851, 1875-1895 (parish A)
- Census records 1869 of Bajerovce are available at the state archive.

== See also ==
- List of municipalities and towns in Slovakia
