= Jakubova Voľa =

Village and municipality in Slovakia

- Municipality
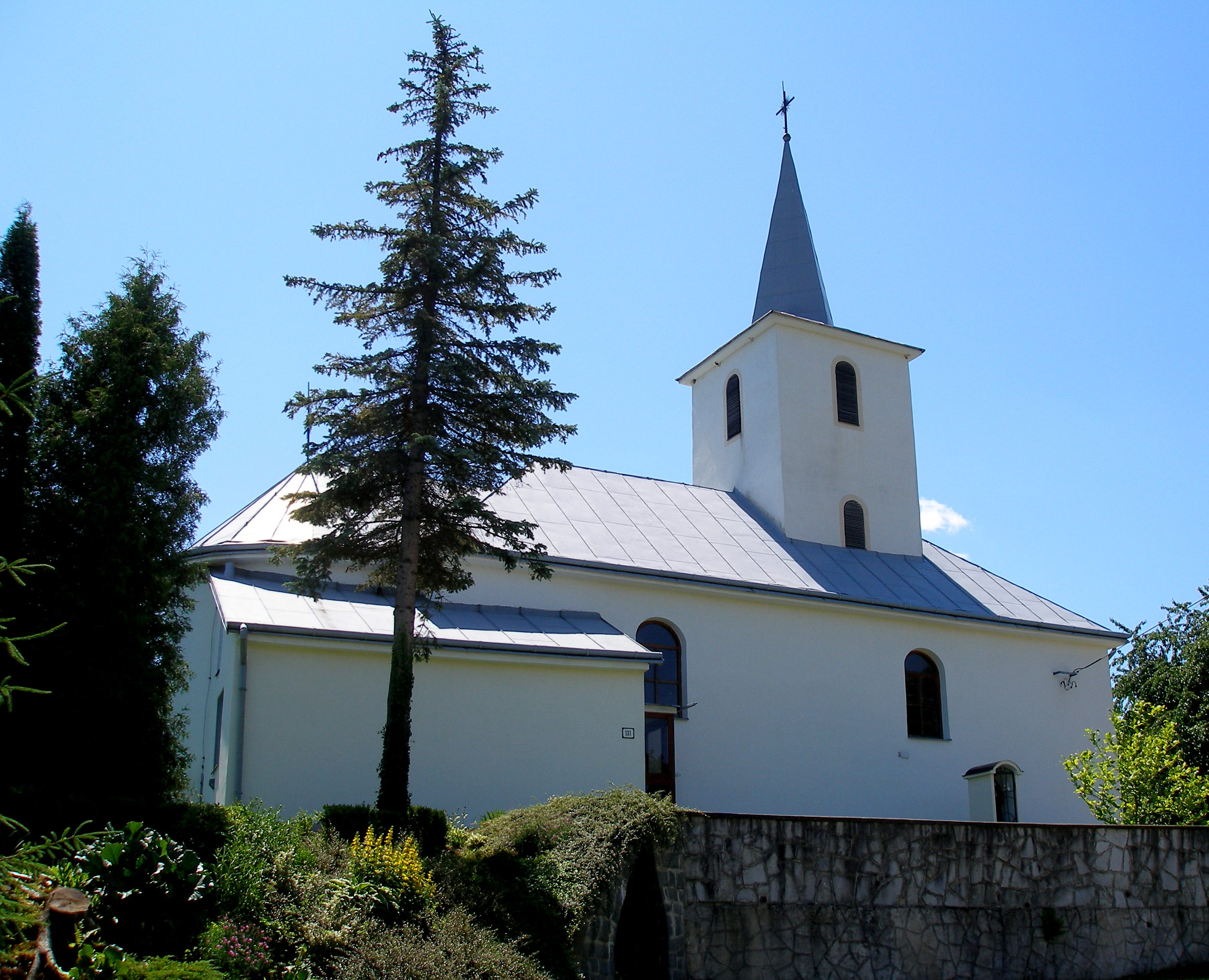

- Flag

- Location of Jakubova Voľa in the Prešov Region Location of Jakubova Voľa in Slovakia
- Coordinates: 49.13°N 21.02°E
- Country: Slovakia
- Region: Prešov Region
- District: Sabinov District
- First mentioned: 1315

Area
  - Total: 5.76 km^{2} (2.22 sq mi)
- Elevation: 367 m (1,204 ft)

Population (2025)
  - Total: 400
- Time zone: UTC+1 (CET)
  - Summer (DST): UTC+2 (CEST)
- Postal code: 825 6
- Area code: +421 51
- Vehicle registration plate (until 2022): SB
- Website: www.jakubovavola.sk

Jakubova Voľa is a village and municipality in Sabinov District in the Prešov Region of north-eastern Slovakia.

== History ==
In historical records the village was first mentioned in 1315.

== Geography ==
The municipality lies at an altitude of 367 metres (1,204 ft) and covers an area of 5.76 km^{2} (2.22 sq mi) (2025).

== Population ==
Population statistic (10 years)
| Year | 1995 | 2005 | 2015 | 2025 |
|---|---|---|---|---|
| Count | 412 | 391 | 422 | 400 |
| Difference | | −5.09% | +7.92% | −5.21% |

Population statistic
| Year | 2024 | 2025 |
|---|---|---|
| Count | 397 | 400 |
| Difference | | +0.75% |

It has a population of 400 people (31 December 2025).

=== Ethnicity ===
Census 2021 (1+ %)
| Ethnicity | Number | Fraction |
|---|---|---|
| Slovak | 376 | 96.9% |
| Not found out | 12 | 3.09% |
| Rusyn | 4 | 1.03% |
| Total | 388 | |

In year 2021 was 388 people by ethnicity 376 as Slovak, 12 as Not found out, 4 as Rusyn, 1 as Czech and 1 as German.

Note on population: The difference values of population numbers in the table "Population statistic" and in the sections "Ethnicity" & "Religion" is caused by the use of various statistical methods.

=== Religion ===
Census 2021 (1+ %)
| Religion | Number | Fraction |
|---|---|---|
| Roman Catholic Church | 315 | 81.19% |
| Greek Catholic Church | 24 | 6.19% |
| Not found out | 20 | 5.15% |
| None | 15 | 3.87% |
| Evangelical Church | 7 | 1.8% |
| Christian Congregations in Slovakia | 4 | 1.03% |
| Total | 388 | |

In year 2021 was 388 people by religion 315 from Roman Catholic Church, 24 from Greek Catholic Church, 20 from Not found out, 15 from None, 7 from Evangelical Church, 4 from Christian Congregations in Slovakia, 1 from Paganism and natural spirituality, 1 from Other and not ascertained christian church and 1 from Buddhism.

== Genealogical resources ==
The records for genealogical research are available at the state archive "Statny Archiv in Presov, Slovakia"

- Roman Catholic church records (births/marriages/deaths): 1676-1901 (parish B)
- Greek Catholic church records (births/marriages/deaths): 1786-1895 (parish B)

== See also ==
- List of municipalities and towns in Slovakia
