= Vysoká, Sabinov District =

Vysoká
- Municipality
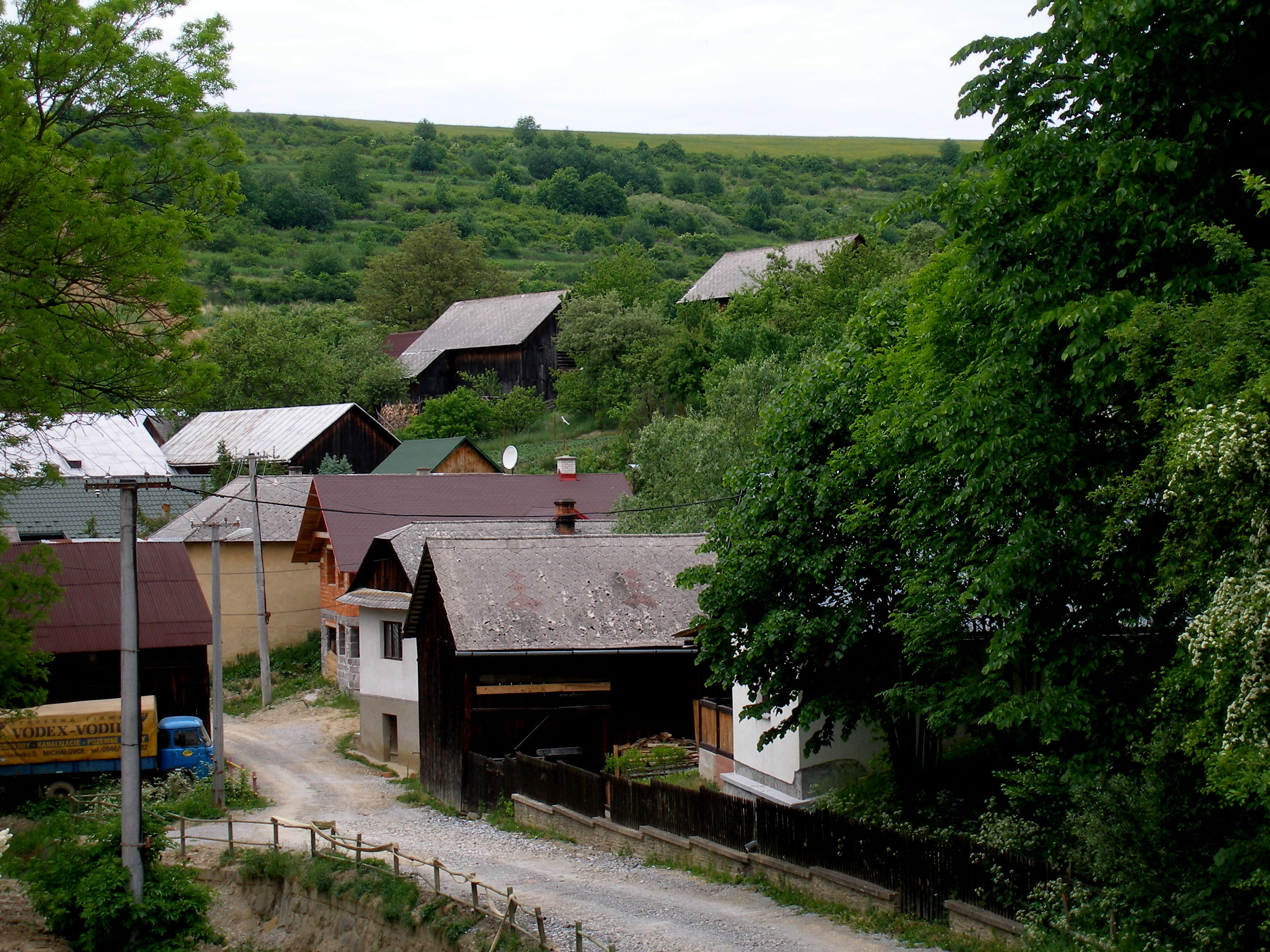

- Location of Vysoká in the Prešov Region Location of Vysoká in Slovakia
- Coordinates: 49.12°N 20.88°E
- Country: Slovakia
- Region: Prešov Region
- District: Sabinov District
- First mentioned: 1278

Area
  - Total: 6.86 km^{2} (2.65 sq mi)
- Elevation: 549 m (1,801 ft)

Population (2025)
  - Total: 111
- Time zone: UTC+1 (CET)
  - Summer (DST): UTC+2 (CEST)
- Postal code: 827 4
- Area code: +421 54
- Vehicle registration plate (until 2022): SB
- Website: www.obecvysoka.com

Vysoká is a village and municipality in Sabinov District in the Prešov Region of north-eastern Slovakia.

== History ==
In historical records the village was first mentioned in 1278.

== Geography ==
The municipality lies at an altitude of 549 metres (1,801 ft) and covers an area of 6.86 km^{2} (2.65 sq mi) (2025).

== Population ==
Population statistic (10 years)
Year	1995	2005	2015	2025
Count	167	150	131	111
Difference		−10.17%	−12.66%	−15.26%

Population statistic
Year	2024	2025
Count	115	111
Difference		−3.47%

It has a population of 111 people (31 December 2025).

=== Ethnicity ===
Census 2021 (1+ %)
Ethnicity	Number	Fraction
Slovak	121	100%
Total	121	

In year 2021 was 121 people by ethnicity 121 as Slovak and 1 as Russian.

Note on population: The difference values of population numbers in the table "Population statistic" and in the sections "Ethnicity" & "Religion" is caused by the use of various statistical methods.

=== Religion ===
Census 2021 (1+ %)
Religion	Number	Fraction
Roman Catholic Church	120	99.17%
Total	121	

In year 2021 was 121 people by religion 120 from Roman Catholic Church and 1 from None.
