= Milpoš =

- Municipality
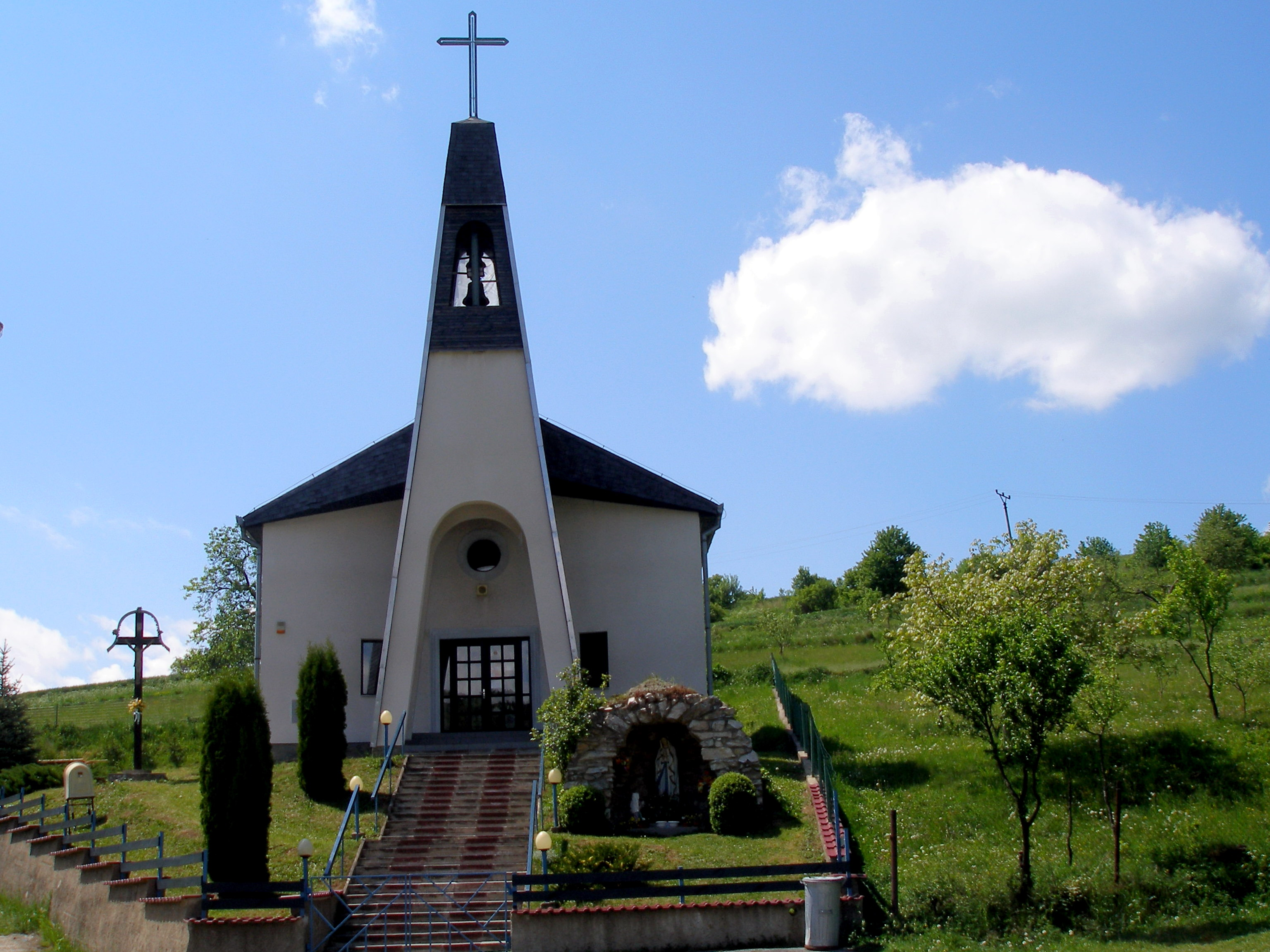

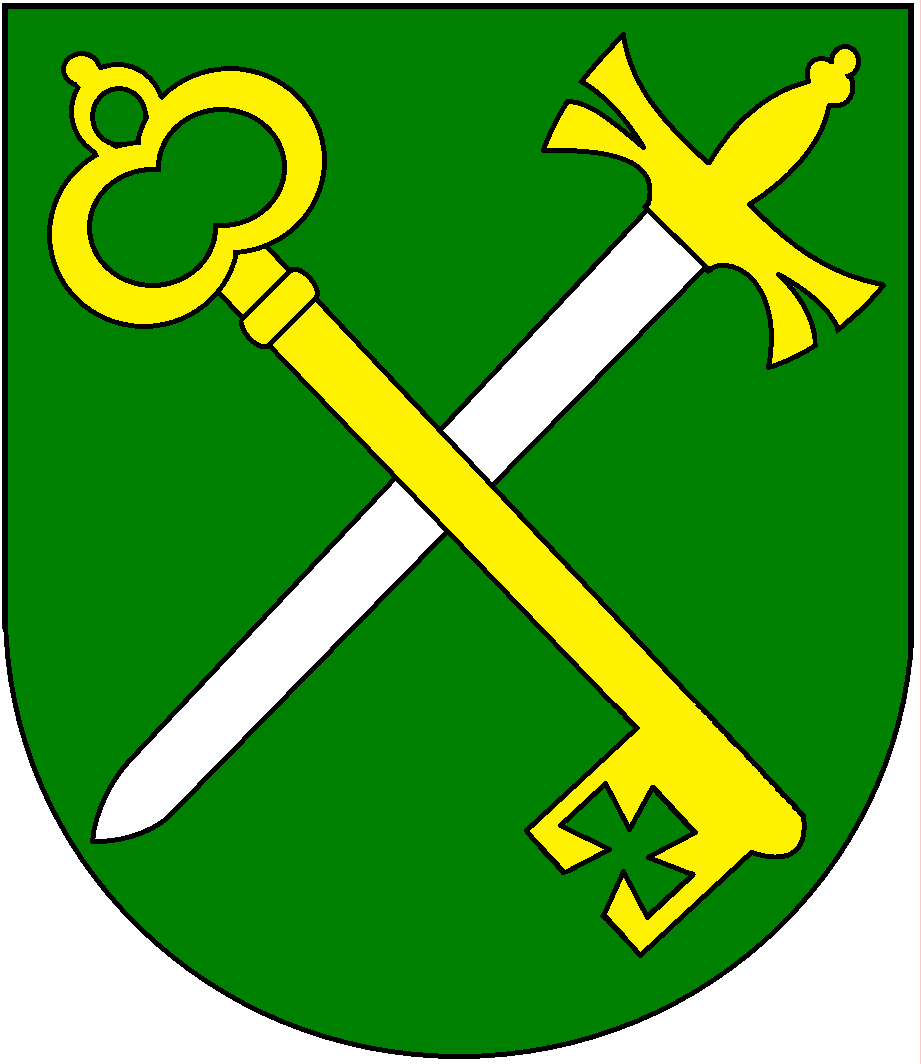
- Flag Coat of arms

- Location of Milpoš in the Prešov Region Location of Milpoš in Slovakia
- Coordinates: 49.18°N 21.02°E
- Country: Slovakia
- Region: Prešov Region
- District: Sabinov District
- First mentioned: 1950

Area
  - Total: 11.08 km^{2} (4.28 sq mi)
- Elevation: 495 m (1,624 ft)

Population (2025)
  - Total: 669
- Time zone: UTC+1 (CET)
  - Summer (DST): UTC+2 (CEST)
- Postal code: 827 1
- Area code: +421 51
- Vehicle registration plate (until 2022): SB
- Website: www.milpos.sk

Milpoš is a village and municipality in Sabinov District in the Prešov Region of north-eastern Slovakia.

== History ==
In historical records the village was first mentioned in 1950.

Milpoš coat of arms is seen at the right.

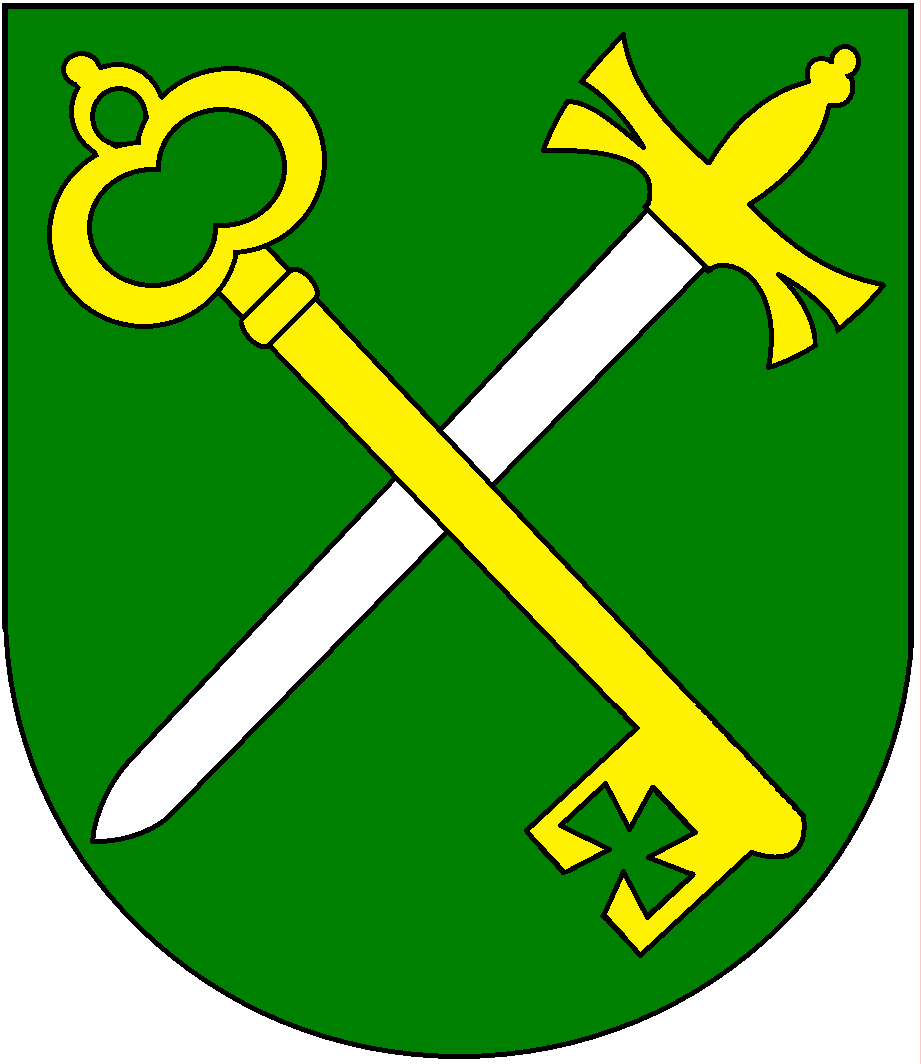
coat of arms

== Geography ==
The municipality lies at an altitude of 495 metres (1,624 ft) and covers an area of 11.08 km^{2} (4.28 sq mi) (2025).

== Population ==
Population statistic (10 years)
Year	1995	2005	2015	2025
Count	621	659	680	669
Difference		+6.11%	+3.18%	−1.61%

Population statistic
Year	2024	2025
Count	657	669
Difference		+1.82%

It has a population of 669 people (31 December 2025).

=== Ethnicity ===
Census 2021 (1+ %)
Ethnicity	Number	Fraction
Slovak	643	98.46%
Not found out	10	1.53%
Romani	7	1.07%
Total	653	

In year 2021 was 653 people by ethnicity 643 as Slovak, 10 as Not found out, 7 as Romani and 4 as Czech.

Note on population: The difference values of population numbers in the table "Population statistic" and in the sections "Ethnicity" & "Religion" is caused by the use of various statistical methods.

=== Religion ===
Census 2021 (1+ %)
Religion	Number	Fraction
Greek Catholic Church	431	66%
Roman Catholic Church	142	21.75%
Apostolic Church	41	6.28%
None	28	4.29%
Total	653	

In year 2021 was 653 people by religion 431 from Greek Catholic Church, 142 from Roman Catholic Church, 41 from Apostolic Church, 28 from None, 5 from Evangelical Church, 4 from Not found out, 1 from Paganism and natural spirituality and 1 from Other.
