= Uzovce =

Municipality of Slovakia

- Municipality
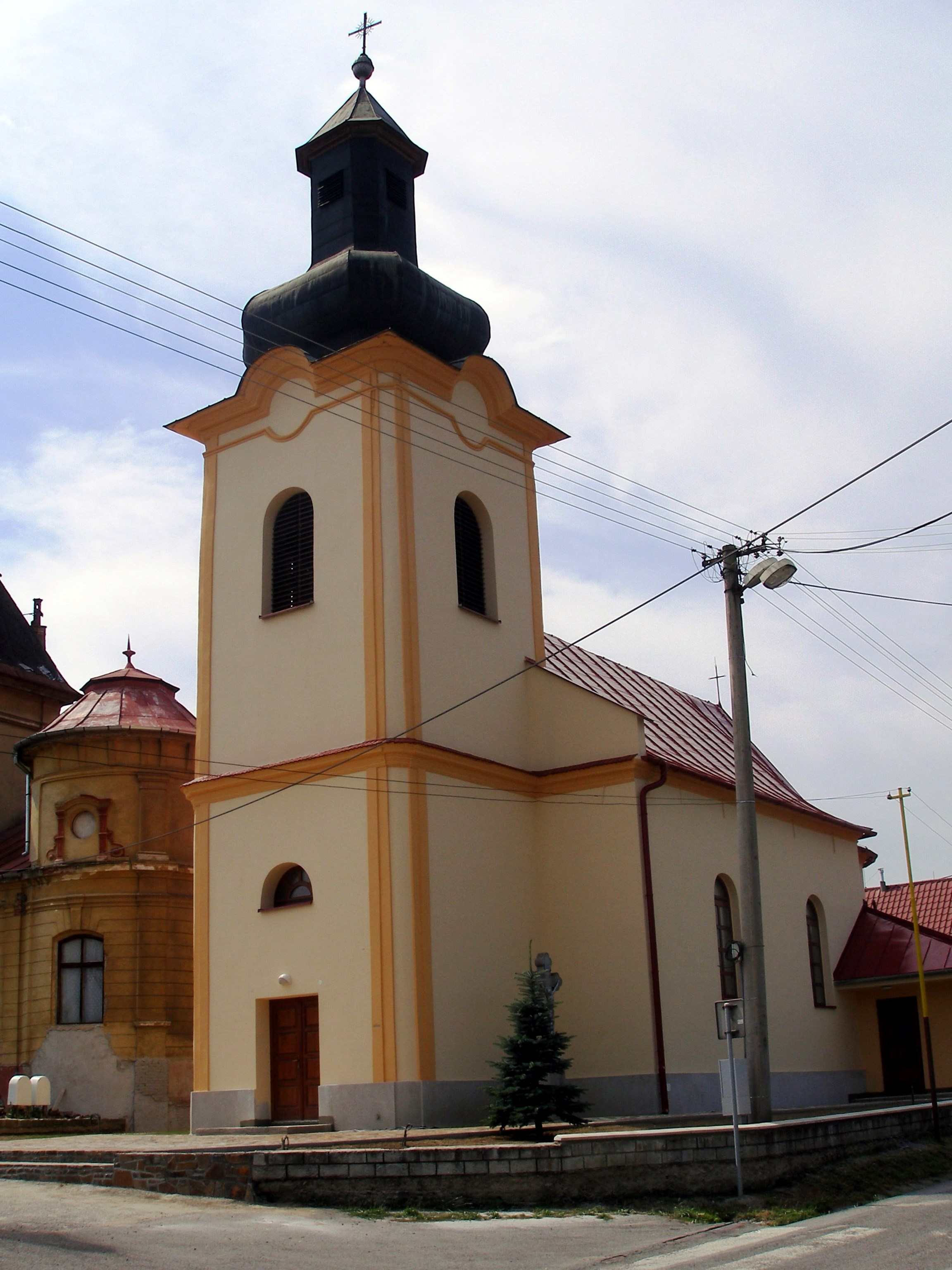

- Flag

- Location of Uzovce in the Prešov Region Location of Uzovce in Slovakia
- Coordinates: 49.08°N 21.18°E
- Country: Slovakia
- Region: Prešov Region
- District: Sabinov District
- First mentioned: 1370

Area
  - Total: 5.54 km^{2} (2.14 sq mi)
- Elevation: 388 m (1,273 ft)

Population (2025)
  - Total: 535
- Time zone: UTC+1 (CET)
  - Summer (DST): UTC+2 (CEST)
- Postal code: 826 6
- Area code: +421 51
- Vehicle registration plate (until 2022): SB
- Website: www.uzovce.sk

Uzovce is a village and municipality in Sabinov District in the Prešov Region' of north-eastern Slovakia.

== History ==
In historical records the village was first mentioned in 1370.

== Geography ==
The municipality lies at an altitude of 388 metres (1,273 ft) and covers an area of 5.54 km^{2} (2.14 sq mi) (2025).

== Population ==
Population statistic (10 years)
Year	1995	2005	2015	2025
Count	479	499	529	535
Difference		+4.17%	+6.01%	+1.13%

Population statistic
Year	2024	2025
Count	537	535
Difference		−0.37%

It has a population of 535 people (31 December 2025).

=== Ethnicity ===
Census 2021 (1+ %)
Ethnicity	Number	Fraction
Slovak	520	97.74%
Not found out	10	1.87%
Total	532	

In year 2021 was 532 people by ethnicity 520 as Slovak, 10 as Not found out, 2 as Czech, 2 as Rusyn, 2 as Bulgarian, 1 as German and 1 as Other.

Note on population: The difference values of population numbers in the table "Population statistic" and in the sections "Ethnicity" & "Religion" is caused by the use of various statistical methods.

=== Religion ===
Census 2021 (1+ %)
Religion	Number	Fraction
Roman Catholic Church	490	92.11%
None	15	2.82%
Greek Catholic Church	11	2.07%
Not found out	10	1.88%
Total	532	

In year 2021 was 532 people by religion 490 from Roman Catholic Church, 15 from None, 11 from Greek Catholic Church, 10 from Not found out, 3 from Evangelical Church, 1 from Eastern Orthodox Church, 1 from Paganism and natural spirituality and 1 from Ad hoc movements.
