= Renčišov =

- Municipality
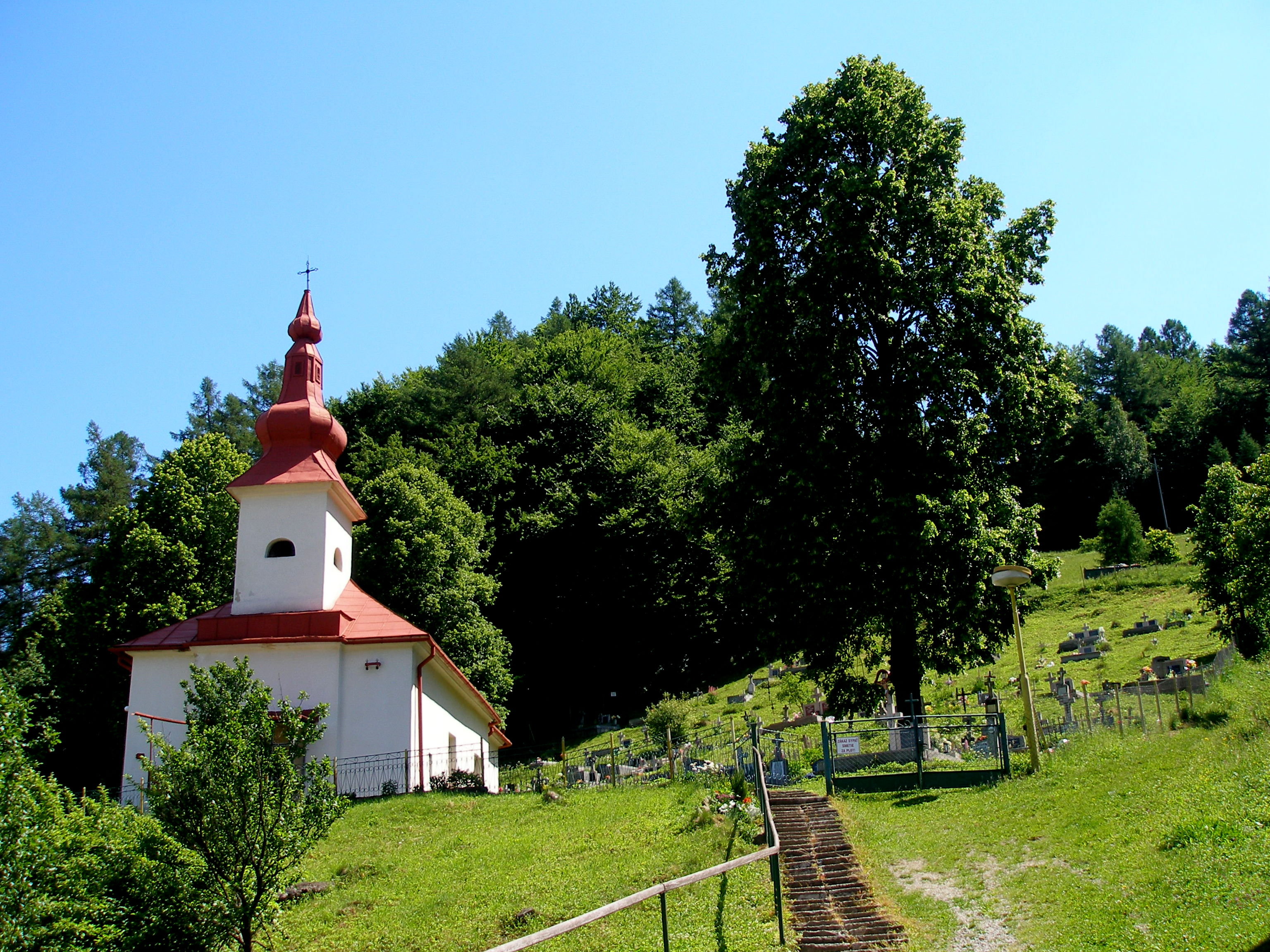

- Flag

- Location of Renčišov in the Prešov Region Location of Renčišov in Slovakia
- Coordinates: 49.10°N 20.97°E
- Country: Slovakia
- Region: Prešov Region
- District: Sabinov District
- First mentioned: 1389

Area
  - Total: 8.86 km^{2} (3.42 sq mi)
- Elevation: 633 m (2,077 ft)

Population (2025)
  - Total: 168
- Time zone: UTC+1 (CET)
  - Summer (DST): UTC+2 (CEST)
- Postal code: 826 3
- Area code: +421 51
- Vehicle registration plate (until 2022): SB
- Website: rencisov.sk/sk

Renčišov is a village and municipality in Sabinov District in the Prešov Region of north-eastern Slovakia.

== History ==
In historical records the village was first mentioned in 1389.

== Geography ==
The municipality lies at an altitude of 633 metres (2,077 ft) and covers an area of 8.86 km^{2} (3.42 sq mi) (2025).

== Population ==
Population statistic (10 years)
Year	1995	2005	2015	2025
Count	177	182	169	168
Difference		+2.82%	−7.14%	−0.59%

Population statistic
Year	2024	2025
Count	171	168
Difference		−1.75%

It has a population of 168 people (31 December 2025).

=== Ethnicity ===
Census 2021 (1+ %)
Ethnicity	Number	Fraction
Slovak	171	95.53%
Rusyn	16	8.93%
Ukrainian	3	1.67%
Not found out	2	1.11%
Other	2	1.11%
Total	179	

In year 2021 was 179 people by ethnicity 171 as Slovak, 16 as Rusyn, 3 as Ukrainian, 2 as Not found out and 2 as Other.

Note on population: The difference values of population numbers in the table "Population statistic" and in the sections "Ethnicity" & "Religion" is caused by the use of various statistical methods.

=== Religion ===
Census 2021 (1+ %)
Religion	Number	Fraction
Greek Catholic Church	117	65.36%
Roman Catholic Church	39	21.79%
None	13	7.26%
Apostolic Church	5	2.79%
Eastern Orthodox Church	4	2.23%
Total	179	

In year 2021 was 179 people by religion 117 from Greek Catholic Church, 39 from Roman Catholic Church, 13 from None, 5 from Apostolic Church, 4 from Eastern Orthodox Church and 1 from Ad hoc movements.
