= Červená Voda, Sabinov District =

Municipality of Slovakia

Červená Voda
- Municipality
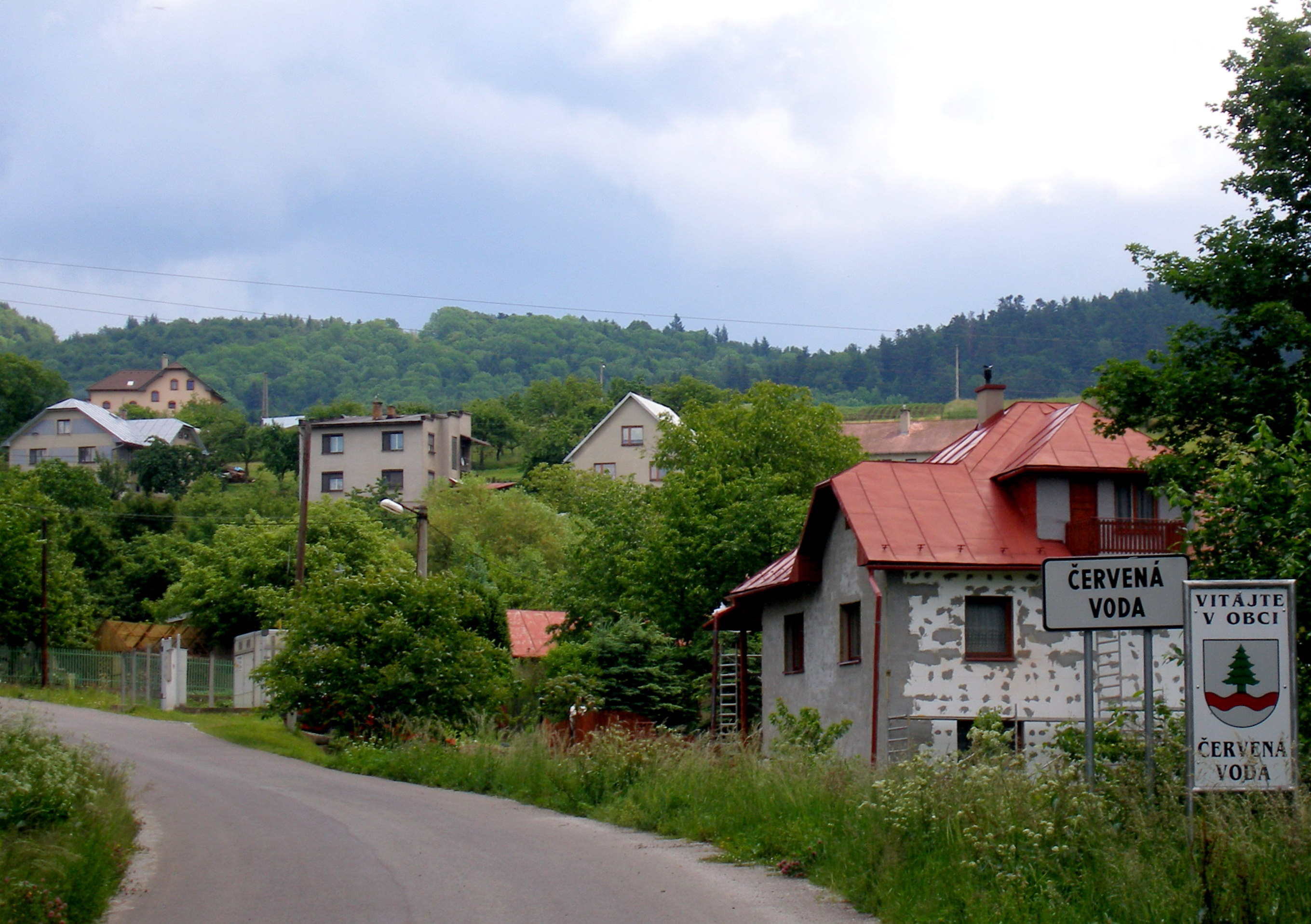

- Flag

- Location of Červená Voda in the Prešov Region Location of Červená Voda in Slovakia
- Coordinates: 49.15°N 21.09°E
- Country: Slovakia
- Region: Prešov Region
- District: Sabinov District
- First mentioned: 1956

Area
  - Total: 5.45 km^{2} (2.10 sq mi)
- Elevation: 520 m (1,710 ft)

Population (2025)
  - Total: 542
- Time zone: UTC+1 (CET)
  - Summer (DST): UTC+2 (CEST)
- Postal code: 830 1
- Area code: +421 51
- Vehicle registration plate (until 2022): SB
- Website: www.cervenavoda.sk

Červená Voda is a village and municipality in Sabinov District in the Prešov Region of north-eastern Slovakia.

== History ==
In historical records the village was first mentioned in 1956.

== Geography ==
The municipality lies at an altitude of 520 metres (1,710 ft) and covers an area of 5.45 km^{2} (2.10 sq mi) (2025).

== Population ==
Population statistic (10 years)
Year	1995	2005	2015	2025
Count	449	447	497	542
Difference		−0.44%	+11.18%	+9.05%

Population statistic
Year	2024	2025
Count	527	542
Difference		+2.84%

It has a population of 542 people (31 December 2025).

=== Ethnicity ===
Census 2021 (1+ %)
Ethnicity	Number	Fraction
Slovak	502	99.4%
Total	505	

In year 2021 was 505 people by ethnicity 502 as Slovak, 3 as Rusyn, 2 as Not found out and 1 as Hungarian.

Note on population: The difference values of population numbers in the table "Population statistic" and in the sections "Ethnicity" & "Religion" is caused by the use of various statistical methods.

=== Religion ===
Census 2021 (1+ %)
Religion	Number	Fraction
Greek Catholic Church	313	61.98%
Roman Catholic Church	174	34.46%
None	13	2.57%
Total	505	

In year 2021 was 505 people by religion 313 from Greek Catholic Church, 174 from Roman Catholic Church, 13 from None, 2 from Not found out, 2 from Apostolic Church and 1 from Eastern Orthodox Church.
