= Jakovany =

Village and municipality in Slovakia

- Municipality
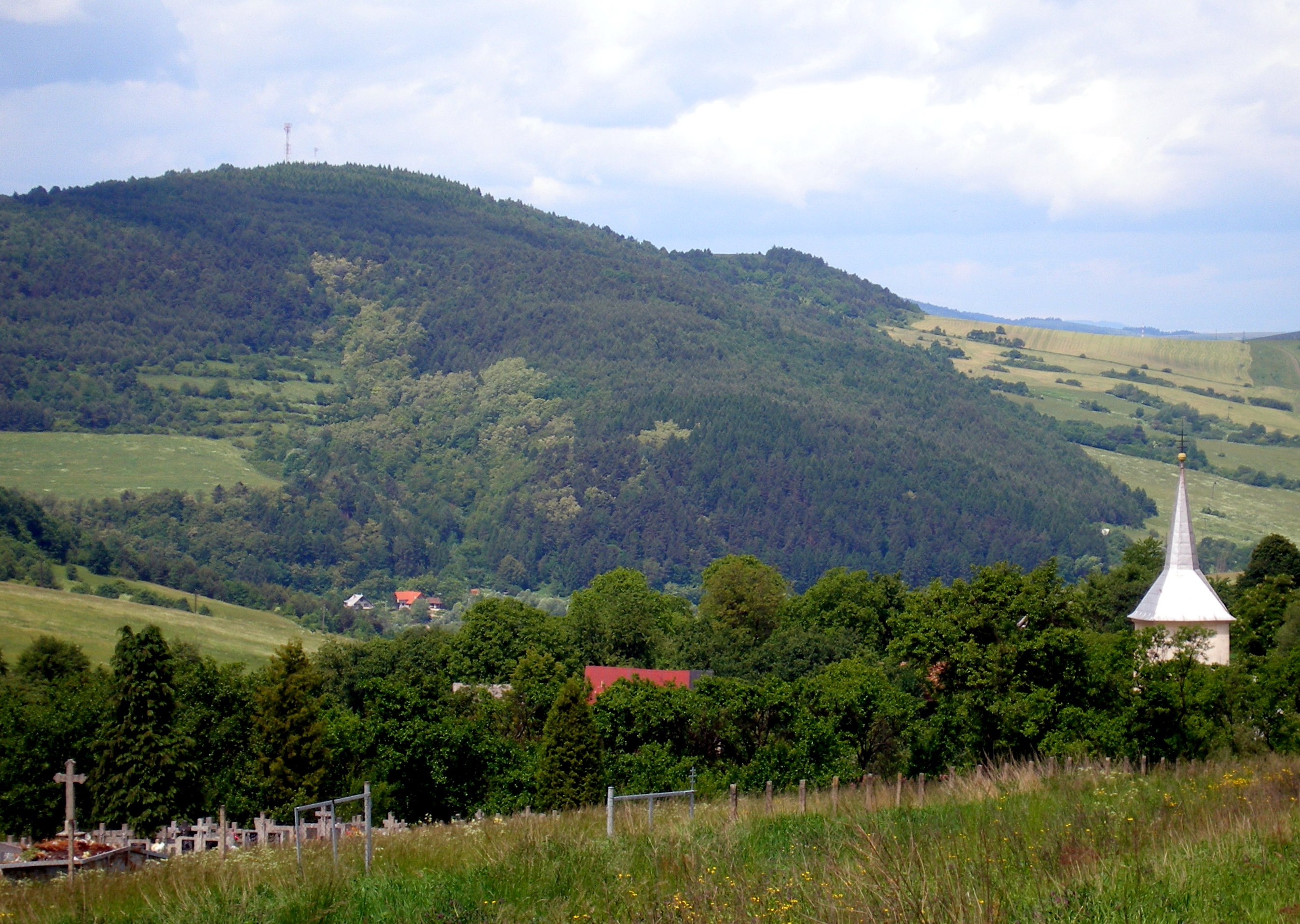

- Flag

- Location of Jakovany in the Prešov Region Location of Jakovany in Slovakia
- Coordinates: 49.15°N 21.07°E
- Country: Slovakia
- Region: Prešov Region
- District: Sabinov District
- First mentioned: 1314

Area
  - Total: 4.88 km^{2} (1.88 sq mi)
- Elevation: 507 m (1,663 ft)

Population (2025)
  - Total: 352
- Time zone: UTC+1 (CET)
  - Summer (DST): UTC+2 (CEST)
- Postal code: 830 1
- Area code: +421 51
- Vehicle registration plate (until 2022): SB
- Website: www.jakovany.sk

Jakovany is a village and municipality in Sabinov District in the Prešov Region of north-eastern Slovakia.

== History ==
In historical records the village was first mentioned in 1314.

== Geography ==
The municipality lies at an altitude of 507 metres (1,663 ft) and covers an area of 4.88 km^{2} (1.88 sq mi) (2025).

== Population ==
Population statistic (10 years)
| Year | 1995 | 2005 | 2015 | 2025 |
|---|---|---|---|---|
| Count | 369 | 352 | 355 | 352 |
| Difference | | −4.60% | +0.85% | −0.84% |

Population statistic
| Year | 2024 | 2025 |
|---|---|---|
| Count | 349 | 352 |
| Difference | | +0.85% |

It has a population of 352 people (31 December 2025).

=== Ethnicity ===
Census 2021 (1+ %)
| Ethnicity | Number | Fraction |
|---|---|---|
| Slovak | 344 | 98.28% |
| Not found out | 7 | 2% |
| Total | 350 | |

In year 2021 was 350 people by ethnicity 344 as Slovak, 7 as Not found out and 1 as Czech.

Note on population: The difference values of population numbers in the table "Population statistic" and in the sections "Ethnicity" & "Religion" is caused by the use of various statistical methods.

=== Religion ===
Census 2021 (1+ %)
| Religion | Number | Fraction |
|---|---|---|
| Greek Catholic Church | 262 | 74.86% |
| Roman Catholic Church | 74 | 21.14% |
| Not found out | 6 | 1.71% |
| None | 6 | 1.71% |
| Total | 350 | |

In year 2021 was 350 people by religion 262 from Greek Catholic Church, 74 from Roman Catholic Church, 6 from Not found out, 6 from None and 2 from Eastern Orthodox Church.

== Genealogical resources ==
The records for genealogical research are available at the state archive "Statny Archiv in Presov, Slovakia"

- Roman Catholic church records (births/marriages/deaths): 1699-1896 (parish B)
- Greek Catholic church records (births/marriages/deaths): 1846-1895 (parish B)

== See also ==
- List of municipalities and towns in Slovakia
