= Rožkovany =

Municipality of Slovakia

- Municipality
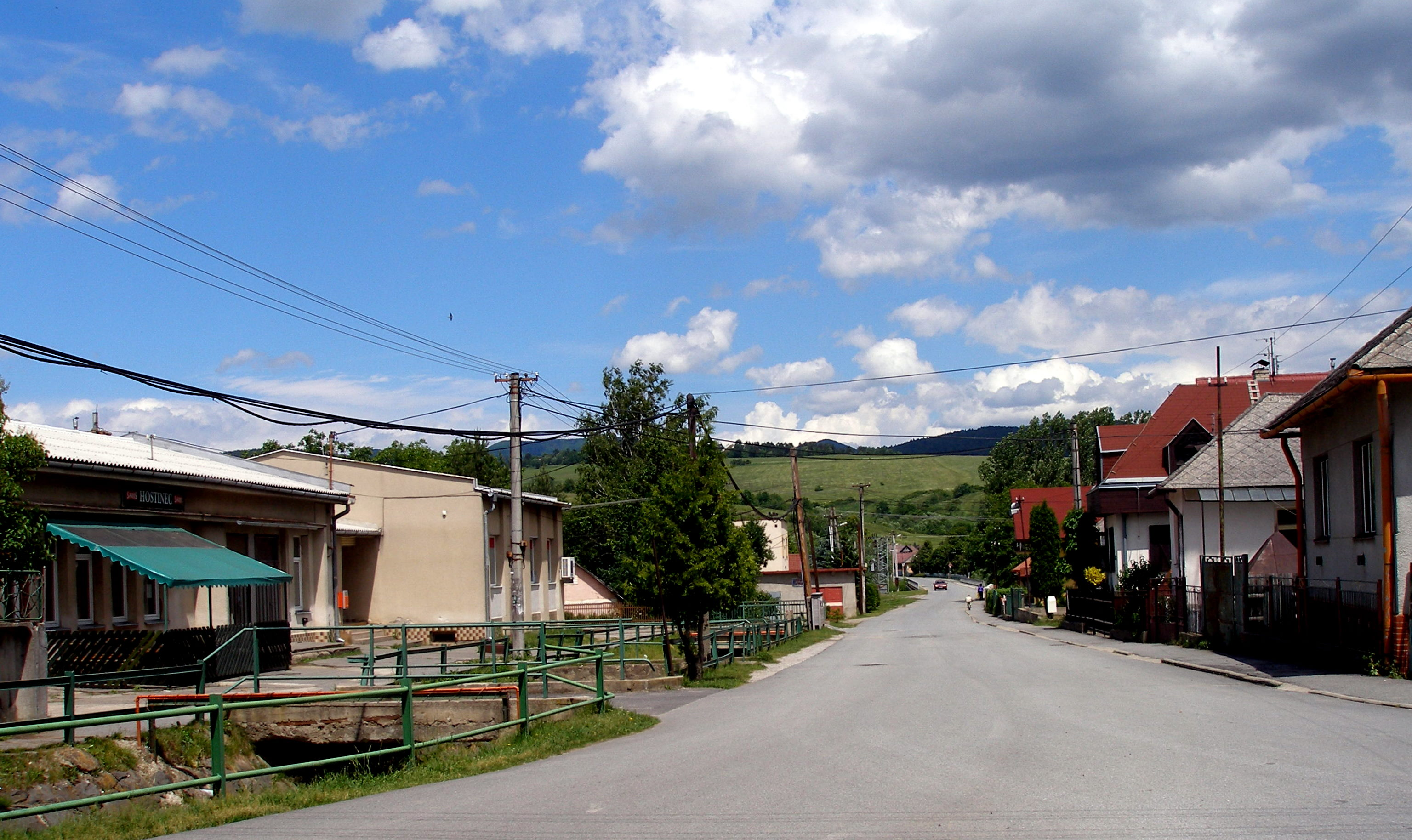

- Flag

- Location of Rožkovany in the Prešov Region Location of Rožkovany in Slovakia
- Coordinates: 49°08′18″N 20°59′25″E
- Country: Slovakia
- Region: Prešov Region
- District: Sabinov District
- First mentioned: 1330

Area
  - Total: 14.05 km^{2} (5.42 sq mi)
- Elevation: 373 m (1,224 ft)

Population (2025)
  - Total: 1,300
- Time zone: UTC+1 (CET)
  - Summer (DST): UTC+2 (CEST)
- Postal code: 827 1
- Area code: +421 51
- Vehicle registration plate (until 2022): SB
- Website: www.rozkovany.sk/sk

Rožkovany is a village and municipality in Sabinov District in the Prešov Region of north-eastern Slovakia.

== History ==
In historical records the village was first mentioned in 1330.

== Geography ==
The municipality lies at an altitude of 373 metres (1,224 ft) and covers an area of 14.05 km^{2} (5.42 sq mi) (2025).

== Population ==
Population statistic (10 years)
Year	1995	2005	2015	2025
Count	1149	1289	1336	1300
Difference		+12.18%	+3.64%	−2.69%

Population statistic
Year	2024	2025
Count	1322	1300
Difference		−1.66%

It has a population of 1300 people (31 December 2025).

=== Ethnicity ===
Census 2021 (1+ %)
Ethnicity	Number	Fraction
Slovak	1219	93.33%
Romani	131	10.03%
Not found out	74	5.66%
Total	1306	

In year 2021 was 1306 people by ethnicity 1219 as Slovak, 131 as Romani, 74 as Not found out, 7 as Rusyn, 3 as Czech, 3 as Irish, 3 as Russian, 1 as Other and 1 as Albanian.

Note on population: The difference values of population numbers in the table "Population statistic" and in the sections "Ethnicity" & "Religion" is caused by the use of various statistical methods.

=== Religion ===
Census 2021 (1+ %)
Religion	Number	Fraction
Roman Catholic Church	1130	86.52%
Not found out	67	5.13%
None	55	4.21%
Greek Catholic Church	27	2.07%
Apostolic Church	15	1.15%
Total	1306	

In year 2021 was 1306 people by religion 1130 from Roman Catholic Church, 67 from Not found out, 55 from None, 27 from Greek Catholic Church, 15 from Apostolic Church, 3 from Eastern Orthodox Church, 3 from Other, 3 from Evangelical Church, 2 from Other and not ascertained christian church and 1 from Ad hoc movements.

== People ==
- the House of Roskoványi
