= Ratvaj =

- Municipality
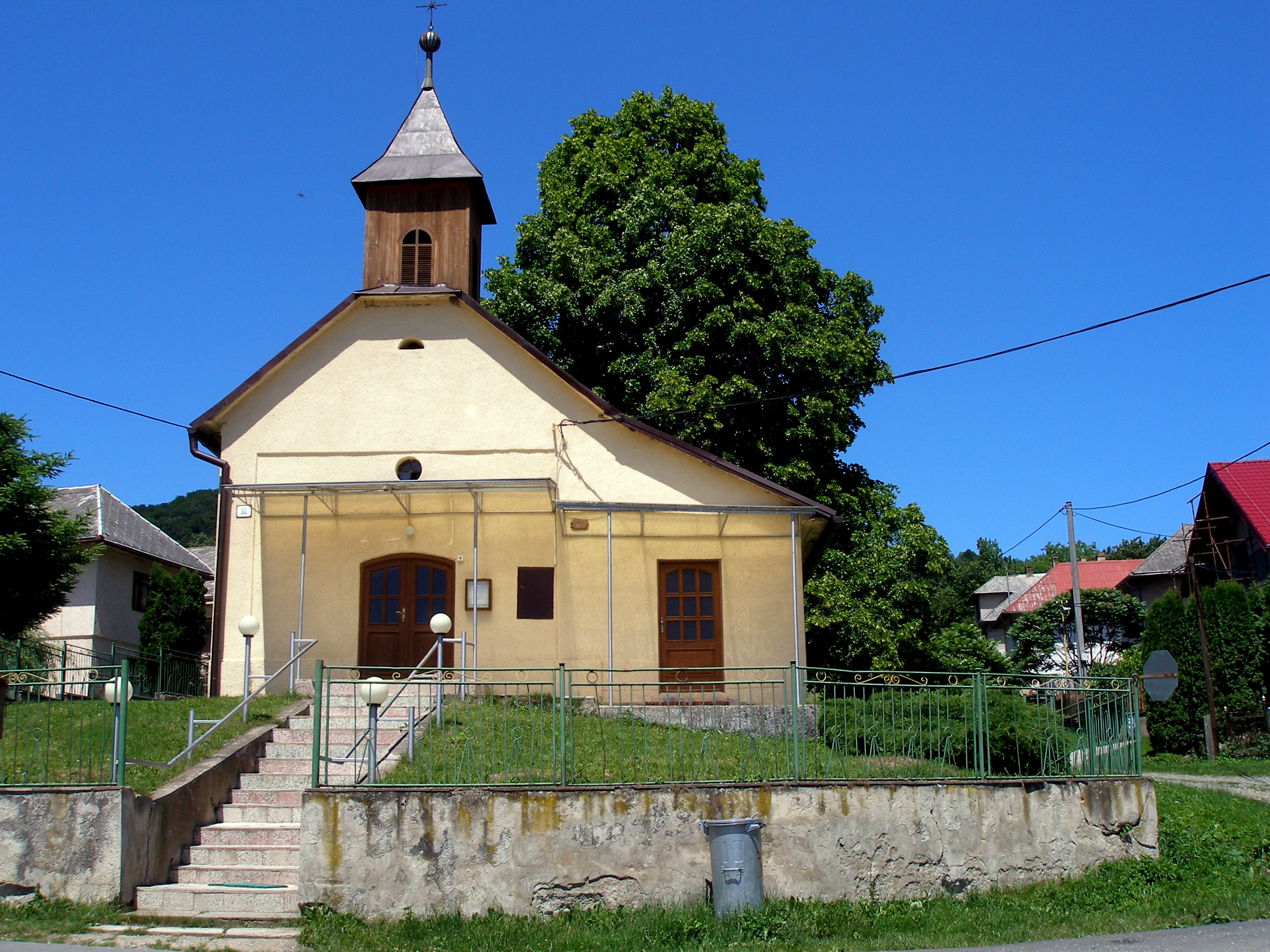

- Flag

- Location of Ratvaj in the Prešov Region Location of Ratvaj in Slovakia
- Coordinates: 49.12°N 21.20°E
- Country: Slovakia
- Region: Prešov Region
- District: Sabinov District
- First mentioned: 1374

Area
  - Total: 5.31 km^{2} (2.05 sq mi)
- Elevation: 419 m (1,375 ft)

Population (2025)
  - Total: 161
- Time zone: UTC+1 (CET)
  - Summer (DST): UTC+2 (CEST)
- Postal code: 826 6
- Area code: +421 51
- Vehicle registration plate (until 2022): SB
- Website: www.obecratvaj.sk

Ratvaj is a village and municipality in Sabinov District in the Prešov Region of north-eastern Slovakia.

== History ==
In historical records the village was first mentioned in 1374.

== Geography ==
The municipality lies at an altitude of 419 metres (1,375 ft) and covers an area of 5.31 km^{2} (2.05 sq mi) (2025).

== Population ==
Population statistic (10 years)
Year	1995	2005	2015	2025
Count	133	142	142	161
Difference		+6.76%	+0%	+13.38%

Population statistic
Year	2024	2025
Count	163	161
Difference		−1.22%

It has a population of 161 people (31 December 2025).

=== Ethnicity ===
Census 2021 (1+ %)
Ethnicity	Number	Fraction
Slovak	145	98.63%
Not found out	2	1.36%
Total	147	

In year 2021 was 147 people by ethnicity 145 as Slovak, 2 as Not found out and 1 as Other.

Note on population: The difference values of population numbers in the table "Population statistic" and in the sections "Ethnicity" & "Religion" is caused by the use of various statistical methods.

=== Religion ===
Census 2021 (1+ %)
Religion	Number	Fraction
Roman Catholic Church	131	89.12%
Greek Catholic Church	7	4.76%
None	7	4.76%
Total	147	

In year 2021 was 147 people by religion 131 from Roman Catholic Church, 7 from Greek Catholic Church, 7 from None, 1 from Eastern Orthodox Church and 1 from Not found out.
