= Uzovský Šalgov =

Village and municipality in Slovakia

- Municipality
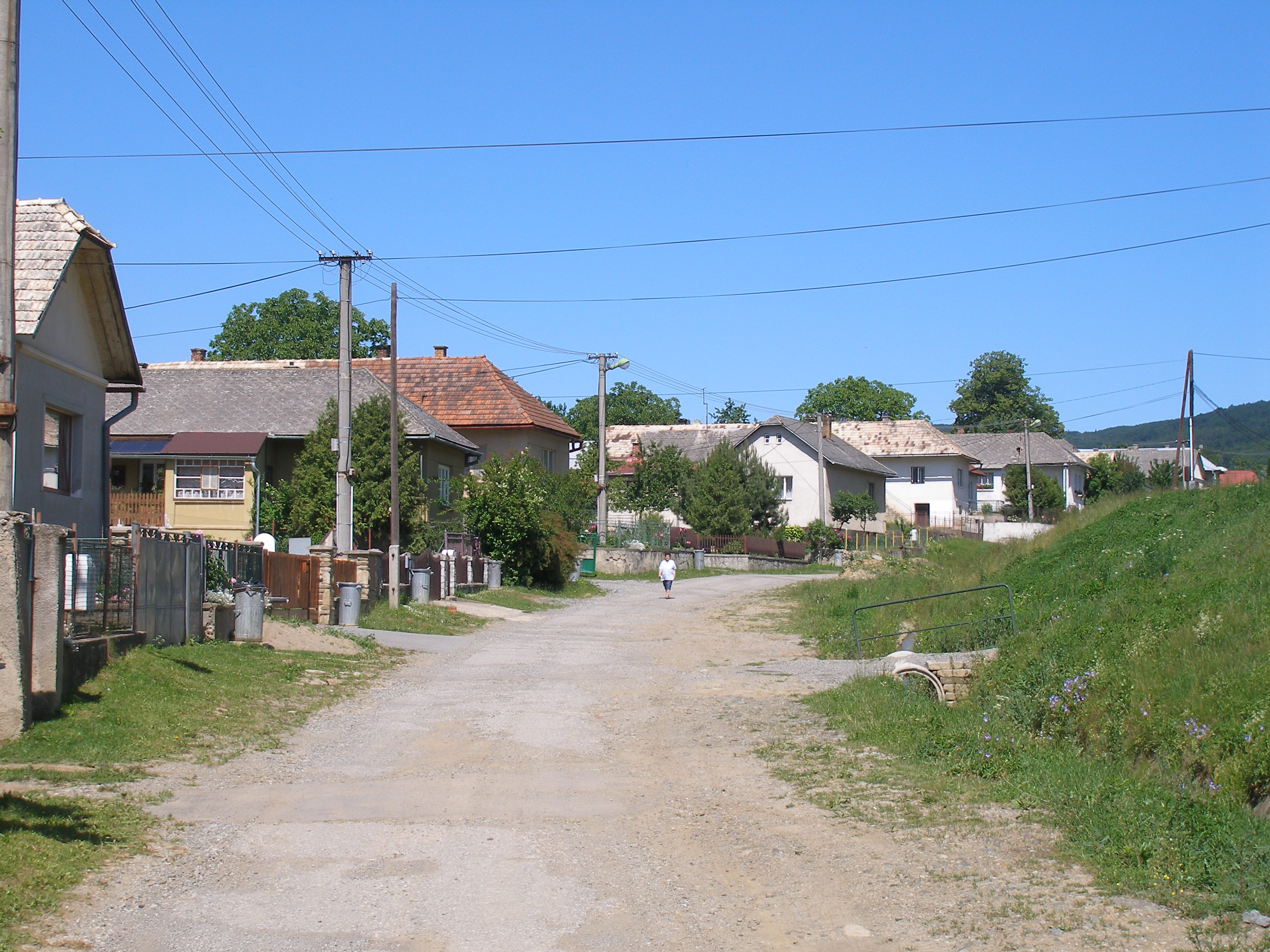

- Flag

- Location of Uzovský Šalgov in the Prešov Region Location of Uzovský Šalgov in Slovakia
- Coordinates: 49.10°N 21.07°E
- Country: Slovakia
- Region: Prešov Region
- District: Sabinov District
- First mentioned: 1314

Area
  - Total: 6.30 km^{2} (2.43 sq mi)
- Elevation: 366 m (1,201 ft)

Population (2025)
  - Total: 675
- Time zone: UTC+1 (CET)
  - Summer (DST): UTC+2 (CEST)
- Postal code: 826 1
- Area code: +421 51
- Vehicle registration plate (until 2022): SB
- Website: www.uzovskysalgov.sk

Uzovský Šalgov is a village and municipality in Sabinov District in the Prešov Region of north-eastern Slovakia.

== History ==
In historical records the village was first mentioned in 1314.

== Geography ==
The municipality lies at an altitude of 366 metres (1,201 ft) and covers an area of 6.30 km^{2} (2.43 sq mi) (2025).

== Population ==
Population statistic (10 years)
Year	1995	2005	2015	2025
Count	567	579	608	675
Difference		+2.11%	+5.00%	+11.01%

Population statistic
Year	2024	2025
Count	669	675
Difference		+0.89%

It has a population of 675 people (31 December 2025).

=== Ethnicity ===
Census 2021 (1+ %)
Ethnicity	Number	Fraction
Slovak	633	99.21%
Total	638	

In year 2021 was 638 people by ethnicity 633 as Slovak, 6 as Not found out, 5 as Rusyn, 3 as Czech, 2 as German and 1 as Polish.

Note on population: The difference values of population numbers in the table "Population statistic" and in the sections "Ethnicity" & "Religion" is caused by the use of various statistical methods.

=== Religion ===
Census 2021 (1+ %)
Religion	Number	Fraction
Roman Catholic Church	596	93.42%
None	18	2.82%
Not found out	8	1.25%
Greek Catholic Church	8	1.25%
Total	638	

In year 2021 was 638 people by religion 596 from Roman Catholic Church, 18 from None, 8 from Not found out, 8 from Greek Catholic Church, 2 from Eastern Orthodox Church, 2 from Other, 2 from Ad hoc movements, 1 from Evangelical Church and 1 from Buddhism.
