= Pečovská Nová Ves =

- Municipality
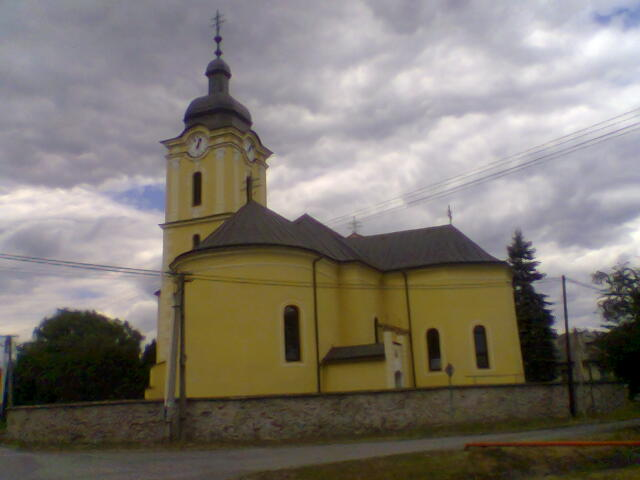

- Flag

- Location of Pečovská Nová Ves in the Prešov Region Location of Pečovská Nová Ves in Slovakia
- Coordinates: 49.13°N 21.05°E
- Country: Slovakia
- Region: Prešov Region
- District: Sabinov District
- First mentioned: 1319

Area
  - Total: 11.75 km^{2} (4.54 sq mi)
- Elevation: 343 m (1,125 ft)

Population (2025)
  - Total: 2,975
- Time zone: UTC+1 (CET)
  - Summer (DST): UTC+2 (CEST)
- Postal code: 825 6
- Area code: +421 51
- Vehicle registration plate (until 2022): SB
- Website: pecovska.sk

Pečovská Nová Ves is a village and municipality in Sabinov District in the Prešov Region of north-eastern Slovakia.

== History ==
In historical records the village was first mentioned in 1319.

== Geography ==
The municipality lies at an altitude of 343 metres (1,125 ft) and covers an area of 11.75 km^{2} (4.54 sq mi) (2025).

== Population ==
Population statistic (10 years)
Year	1995	2005	2015	2025
Count	2133	2302	2704	2975
Difference		+7.92%	+17.46%	+10.02%

Population statistic
Year	2024	2025
Count	2903	2975
Difference		+2.48%

It has a population of 2975 people (31 December 2025).

=== Ethnicity ===
Census 2021 (1+ %)
Ethnicity	Number	Fraction
Slovak	2729	97.88%
Romani	778	27.9%
Not found out	55	1.97%
Total	2788	

In year 2021 was 2788 people by ethnicity 2729 as Slovak, 778 as Romani, 55 as Not found out, 21 as Rusyn, 11 as Czech, 7 as Other, 5 as Ukrainian, 5 as Polish, 2 as Hungarian, 1 as Irish, 1 as Russian and 1 as English.

Note on population: The difference values of population numbers in the table "Population statistic" and in the sections "Ethnicity" & "Religion" is caused by the use of various statistical methods.

=== Religion ===
Census 2021 (1+ %)
Religion	Number	Fraction
Roman Catholic Church	2458	88.16%
Greek Catholic Church	124	4.45%
None	123	4.41%
Not found out	43	1.54%
Total	2788	

In year 2021 was 2788 people by religion 2458 from Roman Catholic Church, 124 from Greek Catholic Church, 123 from None, 43 from Not found out, 16 from Evangelical Church, 10 from Eastern Orthodox Church, 6 from Apostolic Church, 3 from Ad hoc movements, 2 from Other, 1 from Calvinist Church, 1 from Czechoslovak Hussite Church and 1 from Buddhism.

== Main sights ==
- Church of St. Andrew (Kostol sv. Ondreja) - named by the patron saint of village
- Jewish cemetery
- Chapel of St. John of Nepomuk - Main street

== Sport ==
The village has also football club named TJ Slovan and own football playground.

== Transport ==
A small train station is located in village.

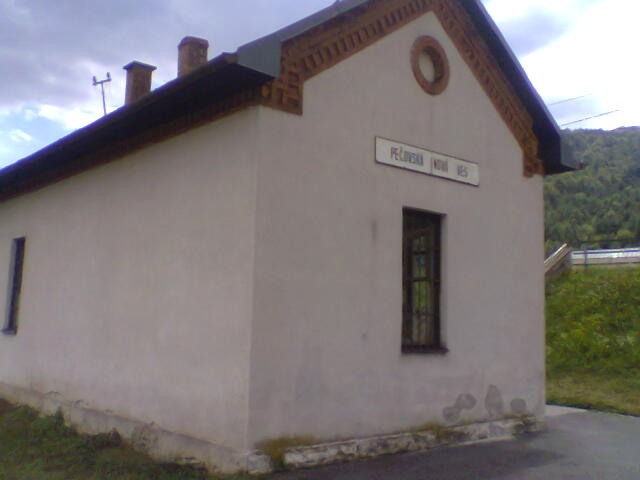
Train station

== Famous people born in Pečovská Nová Ves ==
Milena Dudasova, the United Nations youth ambassador for Slovakia.
