= Ďačov =

Municipality of Slovakia

- Municipality
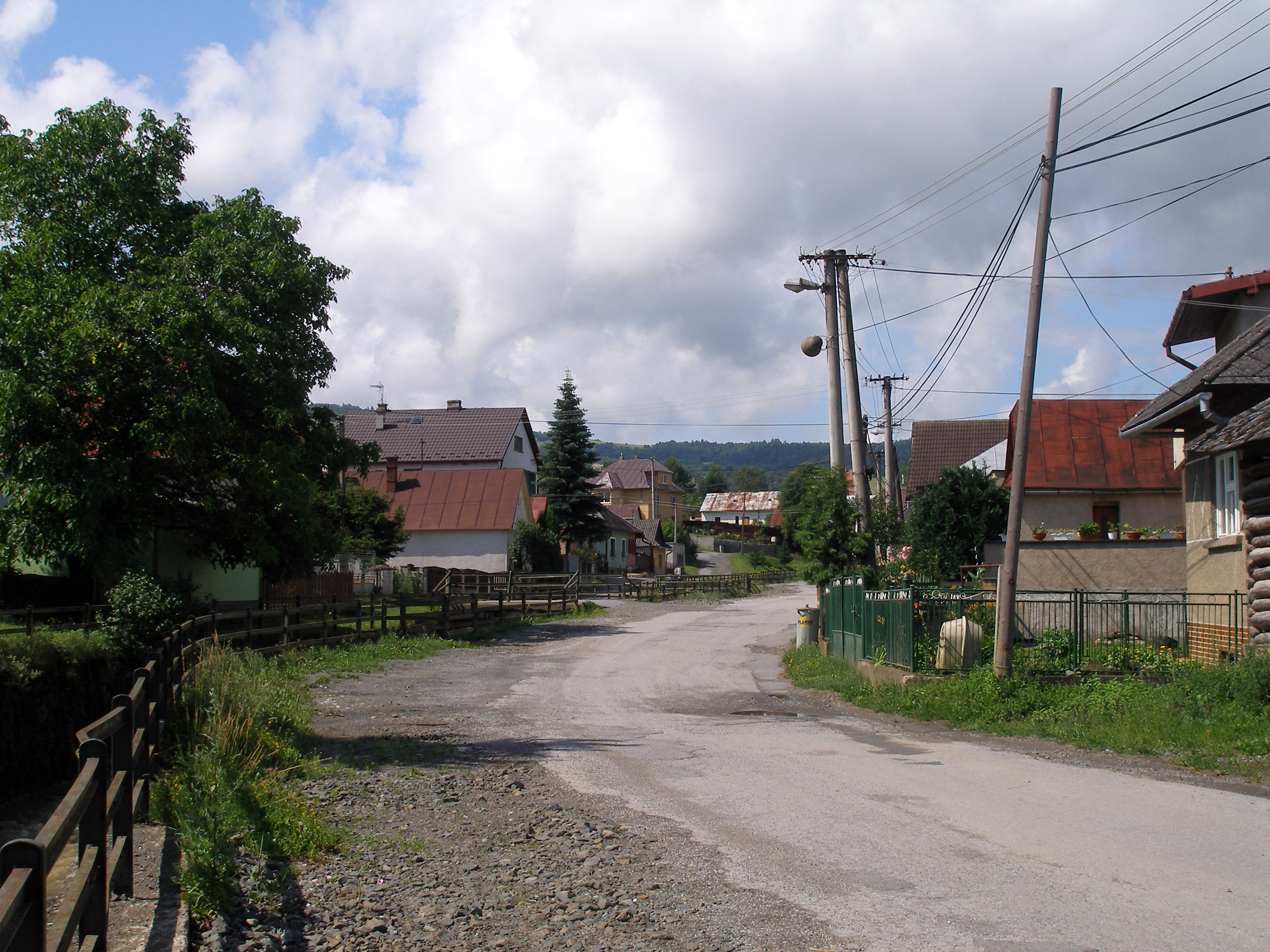

- Flag

- Location of Ďačov in the Prešov Region Location of Ďačov in Slovakia
- Coordinates: 49.15°N 20.93°E
- Country: Slovakia
- Region: Prešov Region
- District: Sabinov District
- First mentioned: 1338

Area
  - Total: 10.46 km^{2} (4.04 sq mi)
- Elevation: 407 m (1,335 ft)

Population (2025)
  - Total: 738
- Time zone: UTC+1 (CET)
  - Summer (DST): UTC+2 (CEST)
- Postal code: 827 1
- Area code: +421 51
- Vehicle registration plate (until 2022): SB
- Website: www.obecdacov.sk

Ďačov is a village and municipality in Sabinov District in the Prešov Region of north-eastern Slovakia.

== History ==
In historical records the village was first mentioned in 1338.

== Geography ==
The municipality lies at an altitude of 407 metres (1,335 ft) and covers an area of 10.46 km^{2} (4.04 sq mi) (2025).

== Population ==
Population statistic (10 years)
Year	1995	2005	2015	2025
Count	741	755	745	738
Difference		+1.88%	−1.32%	−0.93%

Population statistic
Year	2024	2025
Count	744	738
Difference		−0.80%

It has a population of 738 people (31 December 2025).

=== Ethnicity ===
Census 2021 (1+ %)
Ethnicity	Number	Fraction
Slovak	721	99.17%
Rusyn	11	1.51%
Total	727	

In year 2021 was 727 people by ethnicity 721 as Slovak, 11 as Rusyn, 6 as Not found out, 4 as Other, 1 as Russian and 1 as Greek.

Note on population: The difference values of population numbers in the table "Population statistic" and in the sections "Ethnicity" & "Religion" is caused by the use of various statistical methods.

=== Religion ===
Census 2021 (1+ %)
Religion	Number	Fraction
Roman Catholic Church	387	53.23%
Greek Catholic Church	309	42.5%
None	25	3.44%
Total	727	

In year 2021 was 727 people by religion 387 from Roman Catholic Church, 309 from Greek Catholic Church, 25 from None, 3 from Not found out, 1 from Other, 1 from Evangelical Church and 1 from Ad hoc movements.

== Genealogical resources ==
The records for genealogical research are available at the state archive "Statny Archiv in Presov, Slovakia"

- Roman Catholic church records (births/marriages/deaths): 1784-1895 (parish B)
- Greek Catholic church records (births/marriages/deaths): 1844-1951 (parish A)

== See also ==
- List of municipalities and towns in Slovakia
