= Sabinov District =

Coordinates: 49°6′10″N 21°5′52″E

- District
- Country: Slovakia
- Region (kraj): Prešov Region
- Seat: Sabinov

Area
  - Total: 545.44 km^{2} (210.60 sq mi)

Population (2025)
  - Total: 62,360
- Time zone: UTC+1 (CET)
  - Summer (DST): UTC+2 (CEST)
- Telephone prefix: 051
- Vehicle registration plate (until 2022): SB
- Municipalities: 43

Sabinov District (okres Sabinov) is a district in the Prešov Region of eastern Slovakia. It lies on the highlands of Šarišská vrchovina. The district had been established in 1923 and from 1996 exists in its present borders. Food, pharmaceutical and clothing industry and located foremost in its towns and Šarišské Michaľany. In the district are three recreational centers, mainly used during winter and skiing season. Overall, the district suffers from the high unemployment rate. In Sabinov district are 43 municipalities, in two of them are towns.

== Population ==
Population statistic (10 years)
Year	1995	2005	2015	2025
Count	51,622	55,658	59,341	62,360
Difference		+7.81%	+6.61%	+5.08%

Population statistic
Year	2024	2025
Count	61,995	62,360
Difference		+0.58%

It has a population of 62,360 people (31 December 2025).

Historical population
Year	Pop.	±%
1970	42,692	—
1980	46,237	+8.3%
1991	49,200	+6.4%
2001	54,067	+9.9%
2011	57,820	+6.9%
2021	60,389	+4.4%
Source: Statistical Office of the Slovak Republic

=== Ethnicity ===
Census 2021 (1+ %)
Ethnicity	Number	Fraction
Slovak	56,571	79.18%
Romani	10,711	14.99%
Not found out	2646	3.7%
Rusyn	948	1.32%
Total	71,440	

In year 2021 was 71,440 people by ethnicity 56,571 as Slovak, 10,711 as Romani, 2646 as Not found out, 948 as Rusyn, 174 as Czech, 99 as Other, 76 as Ukrainian, 45 as Hungarian, 40 as Russian, 37 as Polish, 26 as German, 10 as Irish, 9 as English, 8 as Italian, 6 as Croatian, 5 as Romanian, 5 as Bulgarian, 4 as Austrian, 3 as Jewish, 3 as Turkish, 3 as Moravian, 3 as Greek, 3 as French, 2 as Silesian, 2 as Albanian and 1 as Canadian.

Note on population: The difference values of population numbers in the table "Population statistic" and in the sections "Ethnicity" & "Religion" is caused by the use of various statistical methods.

=== Religion ===
Census 2021 (1+ %)
Religion	Number	Fraction
Roman Catholic Church	45,432	75.23%
Greek Catholic Church	5698	9.44%
None	3543	5.87%
Not found out	2351	3.89%
Apostolic Church	1134	1.88%
Evangelical Church	827	1.37%
Eastern Orthodox Church	718	1.19%
Total	60,389	

In year 2021 was 60,389 people by religion 45,432 from Roman Catholic Church, 5698 from Greek Catholic Church, 3543 from None, 2351 from Not found out, 1134 from Apostolic Church, 827 from Evangelical Church, 718 from Eastern Orthodox Church, 232 from Jehovah's Witnesses, 103 from Christian Congregations in Slovakia, 102 from Other and not ascertained christian church, 92 from Ad hoc movements, 46 from Other, 23 from Calvinist Church, 22 from Paganism and natural spirituality, 16 from Buddhism, 11 from United Methodist Church, 8 from Church of the Brethren, 7 from Old Catholic Church, 7 from Islam, 4 from Czechoslovak Hussite Church, 4 from Baptists Church, 3 from Jewish community, 3 from Seventh-day Adventist Church, 2 from Hinduism and 1 from New Apostolic Church.

== Municipalities ==
Municipality	Area [km^{2}]	Population
Bajerovce	11.89	272
Bodovce	7.52	390
Brezovica	18.23	1,681
Brezovička	8.98	429
Červená Voda	5.45	542
Červenica pri Sabinove	6.30	995
Ďačov	10.46	738
Daletice	2.48	98
Drienica	9.77	763
Dubovica	17.15	1,430
Hanigovce	8.47	126
Hubošovce	5.82	530
Jakovany	4.88	352
Jakubovany	10.81	972
Jakubova Voľa	5.76	400
Jarovnice	20.17	8,536
Kamenica	21.29	1,784
Krásna Lúka	10.35	642
Krivany	18.86	1,293
Lipany	12.85	6,475
Lúčka	3.89	687
Ľutina	6.90	470
Milpoš	11.08	669
Nižný Slavkov	23.14	880
Olejníkov	44.46	692
Oľšov	10.16	363
Ostrovany	5.85	2,570
Pečovská Nová Ves	11.75	2,975
Poloma	5.91	926
Ratvaj	5.31	161
Ražňany	11.46	1,671
Renčišov	8.86	168
Rožkovany	14.05	1,300
Sabinov	23.83	11,981
Šarišské Dravce	9.92	1,228
Šarišské Michaľany	9.33	2,675
Šarišské Sokolovce	12.26	670
Tichý Potok	8.44	329
Torysa	10.56	1,691
Uzovce	5.54	535
Uzovské Pekľany	9.98	485
Uzovský Šalgov	6.30	675
Vysoká	6.86	111

Population and area values are current for year 2025.
