= Hubošovce =

Village and municipality in Slovakia

- Municipality
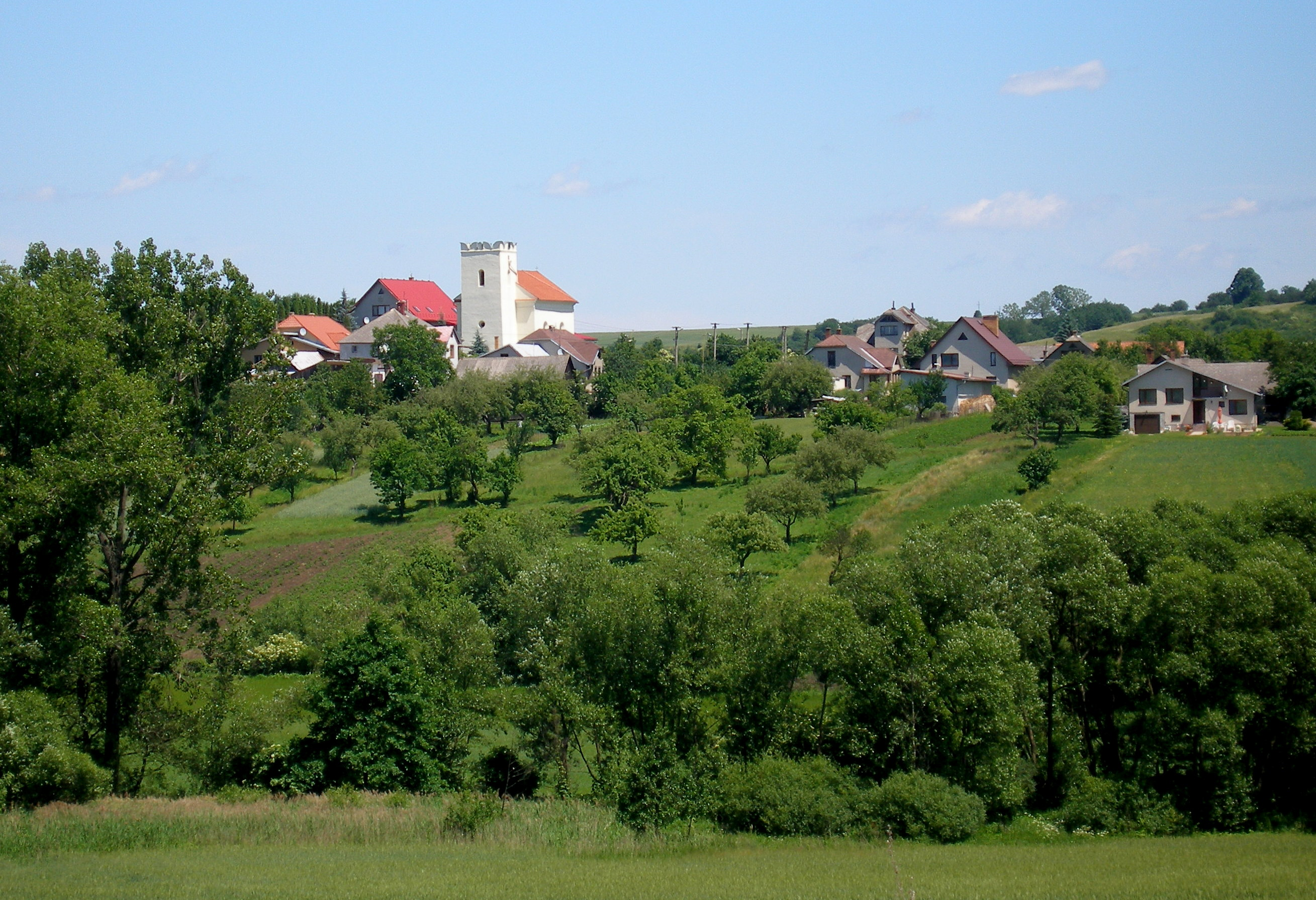

- Flag

- Location of Hubošovce in the Prešov Region Location of Hubošovce in Slovakia
- Coordinates: 49.10°N 21.22°E
- Country: Slovakia
- Region: Prešov Region
- District: Sabinov District
- First mentioned: 1435

Area
  - Total: 5.82 km^{2} (2.25 sq mi)
- Elevation: 356 m (1,168 ft)

Population (2025)
  - Total: 530
- Time zone: UTC+1 (CET)
  - Summer (DST): UTC+2 (CEST)
- Postal code: 826 7
- Area code: +421 51
- Vehicle registration plate (until 2022): SB
- Website: www.hubosovce.eu

Hubošovce is a village and municipality in Sabinov District in the Prešov Region of north-eastern Slovakia.

== History ==
In historical records the village was first mentioned in 1435.

== Geography ==
The municipality lies at an altitude of 356 metres (1,168 ft) and covers an area of 5.82 km^{2} (2.25 sq mi) (2025).

== Population ==
Population statistic (10 years)
Year	1995	2005	2015	2025
Count	408	432	514	530
Difference		+5.88%	+18.98%	+3.11%

Population statistic
Year	2024	2025
Count	535	530
Difference		−0.93%

It has a population of 530 people (31 December 2025).

=== Ethnicity ===
Census 2021 (1+ %)
Ethnicity	Number	Fraction
Slovak	505	98.24%
Not found out	9	1.75%
Total	514	

In year 2021 was 514 people by ethnicity 505 as Slovak, 9 as Not found out, 2 as Ukrainian, 1 as Polish and 1 as Other.

Note on population: The difference values of population numbers in the table "Population statistic" and in the sections "Ethnicity" & "Religion" is caused by the use of various statistical methods.

=== Religion ===
Census 2021 (1+ %)
Religion	Number	Fraction
Roman Catholic Church	469	91.25%
None	24	4.67%
Greek Catholic Church	9	1.75%
Not found out	6	1.17%
Total	514	

In year 2021 was 514 people by religion 469 from Roman Catholic Church, 24 from None, 9 from Greek Catholic Church, 6 from Not found out, 3 from Jehovah's Witnesses, 1 from Eastern Orthodox Church, 1 from Baptists Church and 1 from Ad hoc movements.

== Genealogical resources ==
The records for genealogical research are available at the state archive "Statny Archiv in Presov, Slovakia"

- Roman Catholic church records (births/marriages/deaths): 1829-1900 (parish B)
- Greek Catholic church records (births/marriages/deaths): 1861-1895 (parish B)

== See also ==
- List of municipalities and towns in Slovakia
