= Šarišské Sokolovce =

- Municipality
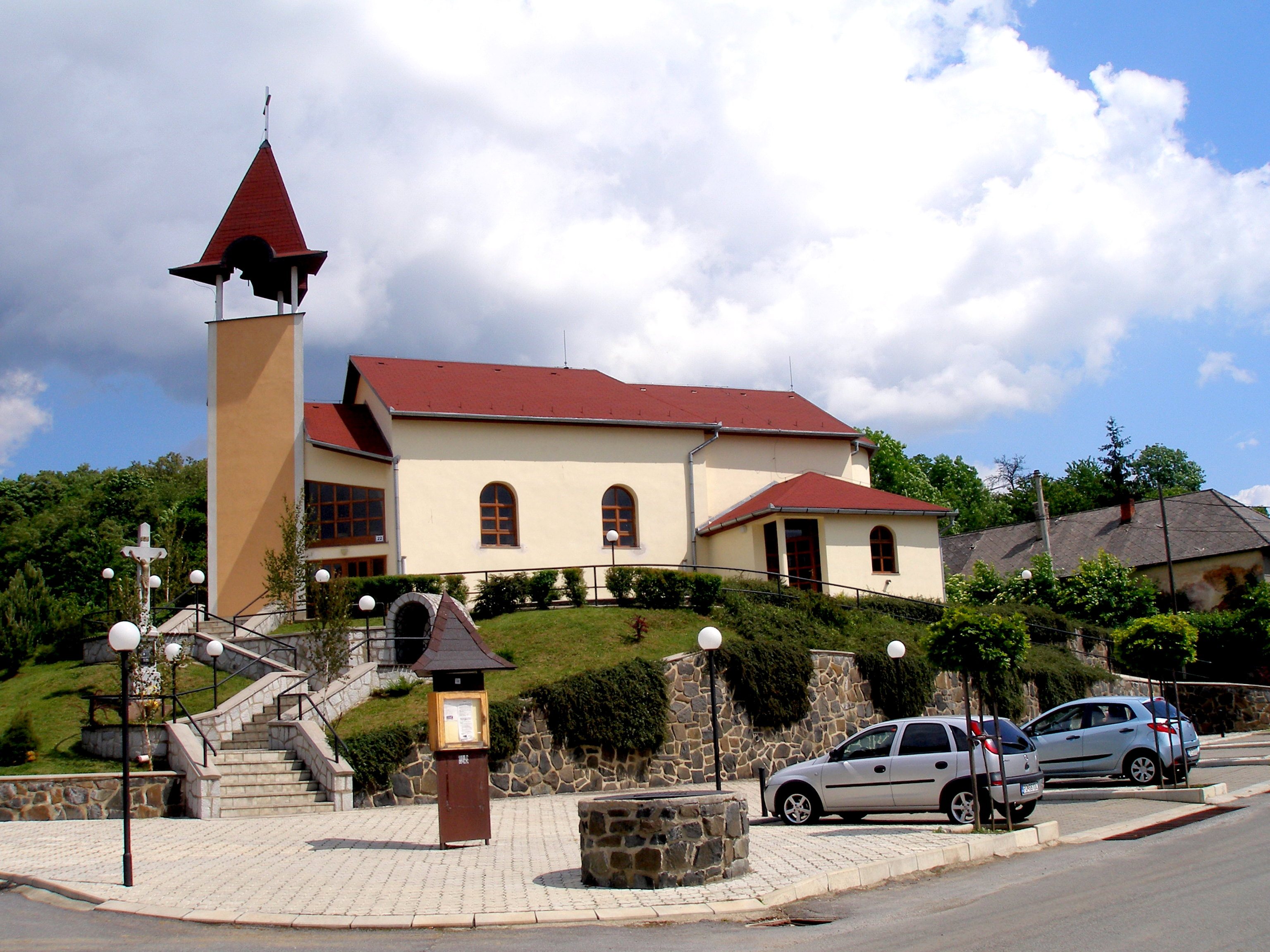

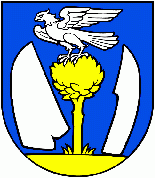
- Flag Coat of arms

- Location of Šarišské Sokolovce in the Prešov Region Location of Šarišské Sokolovce in Slovakia
- Coordinates: 49.12°N 21.17°E
- Country: Slovakia
- Region: Prešov Region
- District: Sabinov District
- First mentioned: 1307

Area
  - Total: 12.26 km^{2} (4.73 sq mi)
- Elevation: 413 m (1,355 ft)

Population (2025)
  - Total: 670
- Time zone: UTC+1 (CET)
  - Summer (DST): UTC+2 (CEST)
- Postal code: 826 6
- Area code: +421 51
- Vehicle registration plate (until 2022): SB
- Website: www.sarisskesokolovce.sk

Šarišské Sokolovce is a village and municipality in Sabinov District in the Prešov Region of north-eastern Slovakia.

== Names and etymology ==
The former Slovak name Tolčemeš derives from Hungarian Tóth – Slav/Slovak and sólyom – a hawk (Slovak sokol). It was given its current official name in 1948.

== History ==
The village was probably founded already in the 11th or the 12th century by Slovak falconers. In historical records the village was first mentioned in 1307.

== Geography ==
The municipality lies at an altitude of 413 metres (1,355 ft) and covers an area of 12.26 km^{2} (4.73 sq mi) (2025).

== Population ==
Population statistic (10 years)
Year	1995	2005	2015	2025
Count	491	511	561	670
Difference		+4.07%	+9.78%	+19.42%

Population statistic
Year	2024	2025
Count	651	670
Difference		+2.91%

It has a population of 670 people (31 December 2025).

=== Ethnicity ===
Census 2021 (1+ %)
Ethnicity	Number	Fraction
Slovak	566	96.42%
Not found out	25	4.25%
Rusyn	12	2.04%
Total	587	

In year 2021 was 587 people by ethnicity 566 as Slovak, 25 as Not found out, 12 as Rusyn, 1 as Ukrainian, 1 as Hungarian and 1 as English.

Note on population: The difference values of population numbers in the table "Population statistic" and in the sections "Ethnicity" & "Religion" is caused by the use of various statistical methods.

=== Religion ===
Census 2021 (1+ %)
Religion	Number	Fraction
Roman Catholic Church	516	87.9%
Not found out	21	3.58%
Greek Catholic Church	20	3.41%
None	19	3.24%
Evangelical Church	7	1.19%
Total	587	

In year 2021 was 587 people by religion 516 from Roman Catholic Church, 21 from Not found out, 20 from Greek Catholic Church, 19 from None, 7 from Evangelical Church, 2 from Jehovah's Witnesses, 1 from Eastern Orthodox Church and 1 from Ad hoc movements.
