= Krásna Lúka =

Municipality of Slovakia

- Municipality
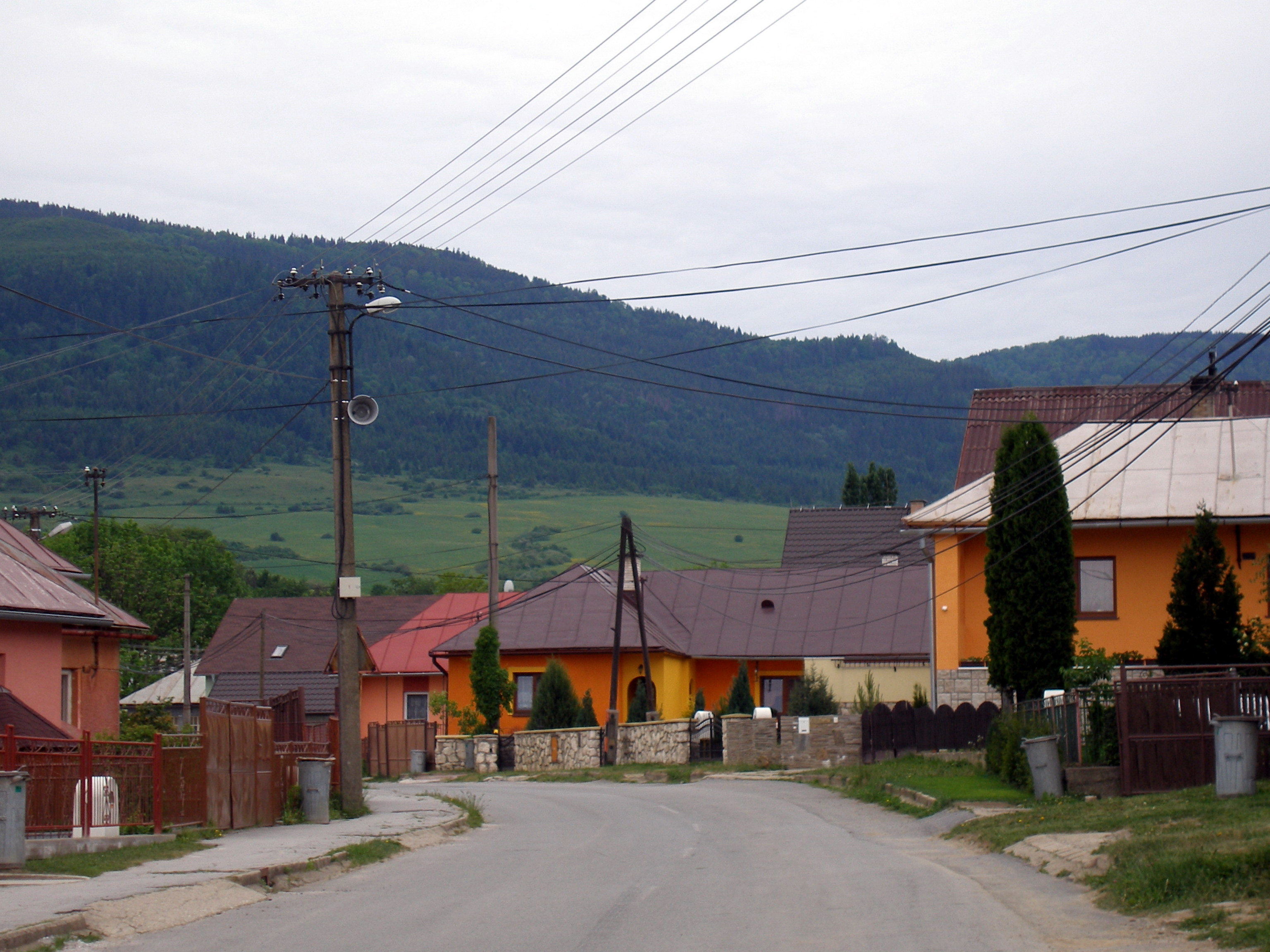

- Flag

- Location of Krásna Lúka in the Prešov Region Location of Krásna Lúka in Slovakia
- Coordinates: 49.20°N 20.82°E
- Country: Slovakia
- Region: Prešov Region
- District: Sabinov District
- First mentioned: 1329

Government
  - Mayor: Marko Osif (KDH)

Area
  - Total: 10.35 km^{2} (4.00 sq mi)
- Elevation: 555 m (1,821 ft)

Population (2025)
  - Total: 642
- Time zone: UTC+1 (CET)
  - Summer (DST): UTC+2 (CEST)
- Postal code: 827 3
- Area code: +421 51
- Vehicle registration plate (until 2022): SB
- Website: www.krasnaluka.sk

Krásna Lúka is a village and municipality in Sabinov District in the Prešov Region of north-eastern Slovakia.

== History ==
In historical records the village was first mentioned in 1329.

== Geography ==
The municipality lies at an altitude of 555 metres (1,821 ft) and covers an area of 10.35 km^{2} (4.00 sq mi) (2025).

== Population ==
Population statistic (10 years)
Year	1995	2005	2015	2025
Count	696	730	708	642
Difference		+4.88%	−3.01%	−9.32%

Population statistic
Year	2024	2025
Count	647	642
Difference		−0.77%

It has a population of 642 people (31 December 2025).

=== Ethnicity ===
Census 2021 (1+ %)
Ethnicity	Number	Fraction
Slovak	644	98.32%
Rusyn	14	2.13%
Not found out	14	2.13%
Total	655	

In year 2021 was 655 people by ethnicity 644 as Slovak, 14 as Rusyn, 14 as Not found out and 4 as Russian.

Note on population: The difference values of population numbers in the table "Population statistic" and in the sections "Ethnicity" & "Religion" is caused by the use of various statistical methods.

=== Religion ===
Census 2021 (1+ %)
Religion	Number	Fraction
Roman Catholic Church	599	91.45%
Greek Catholic Church	26	3.97%
None	14	2.14%
Not found out	9	1.37%
Total	655	

In year 2021 was 655 people by religion 599 from Roman Catholic Church, 26 from Greek Catholic Church, 14 from None, 9 from Not found out, 4 from Christian Congregations in Slovakia, 2 from Ad hoc movements and 1 from Buddhism.
