= Bodovce =

Municipality of Slovakia

- Municipality
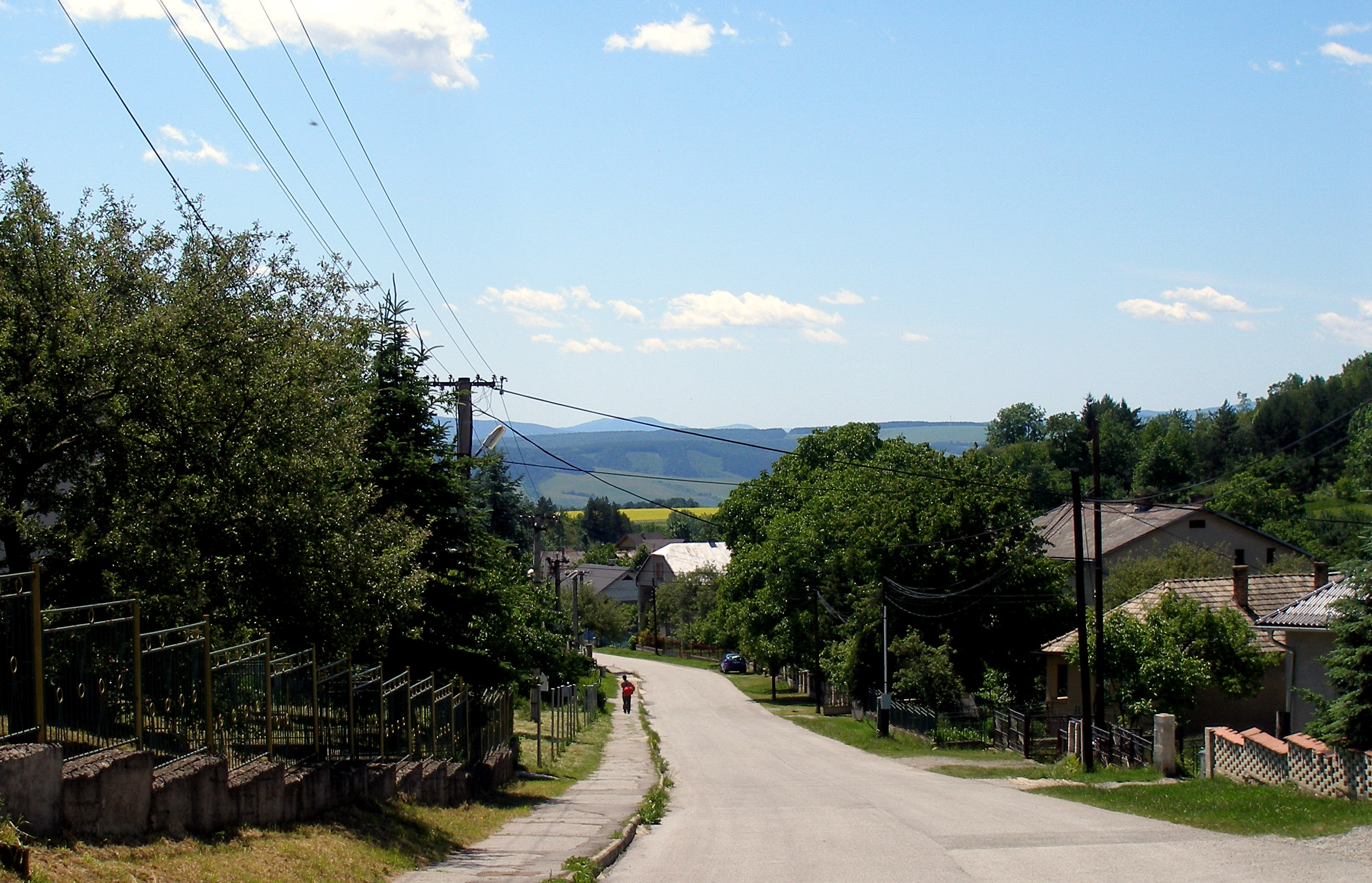

- Flag

- Location of Bodovce in the Prešov Region Location of Bodovce in Slovakia
- Coordinates: 49.11°N 21.18°E
- Country: Slovakia
- Region: Prešov Region
- District: Sabinov District
- First mentioned: 1427

Area
  - Total: 7.52 km^{2} (2.90 sq mi)
- Elevation: 444 m (1,457 ft)

Population (2025)
  - Total: 390
- Time zone: UTC+1 (CET)
  - Summer (DST): UTC+2 (CEST)
- Postal code: 826 6
- Area code: +421 51
- Vehicle registration plate (until 2022): SB
- Website: www.obecbodovce.sk

Bodovce (Hungarian: Bodonlaka) is a village and municipality in Sabinov District in the Prešov Region of northeastern Slovakia.

== History ==
The village was first mentioned in historical records in 1427.

== Geography ==
The municipality lies at an altitude of 444 metres (1,457 ft) and covers an area of 7.52 km^{2} (2.90 sq mi) (2025).

== Population ==
Population statistic (10 years)
Year	1995	2005	2015	2025
Count	277	325	336	390
Difference		+17.32%	+3.38%	+16.07%

Population statistic
Year	2024	2025
Count	392	390
Difference		−0.51%

It has a population of 390 people (31 December 2025).

=== Ethnicity ===
Census 2021 (1+ %)
Ethnicity	Number	Fraction
Slovak	348	98.86%
Rusyn	4	1.13%
Total	352	

In year 2021 was 352 people by ethnicity 348 as Slovak, 4 as Rusyn and 3 as Not found out.

Note on population: The difference values of population numbers in the table "Population statistic" and in the sections "Ethnicity" & "Religion" is caused by the use of various statistical methods.

=== Religion ===
Census 2021 (1+ %)
Religion	Number	Fraction
Roman Catholic Church	333	94.6%
None	11	3.13%
Greek Catholic Church	4	1.14%
Total	352	

In year 2021 was 352 people by religion 333 from Roman Catholic Church, 11 from None, 4 from Greek Catholic Church, 3 from Not found out and 1 from Eastern Orthodox Church.

== Genealogical resources ==
The records for genealogical research are available at the state archive "Statny Archiv in Presov, Slovakia"

- Greek Catholic church records (births/marriages/deaths): 1861-1895 (parish B)

== See also ==
- List of municipalities and towns in Slovakia
