= Nižný Slavkov =

Village and municipality in Sabinov District in Slovakia

- Municipality
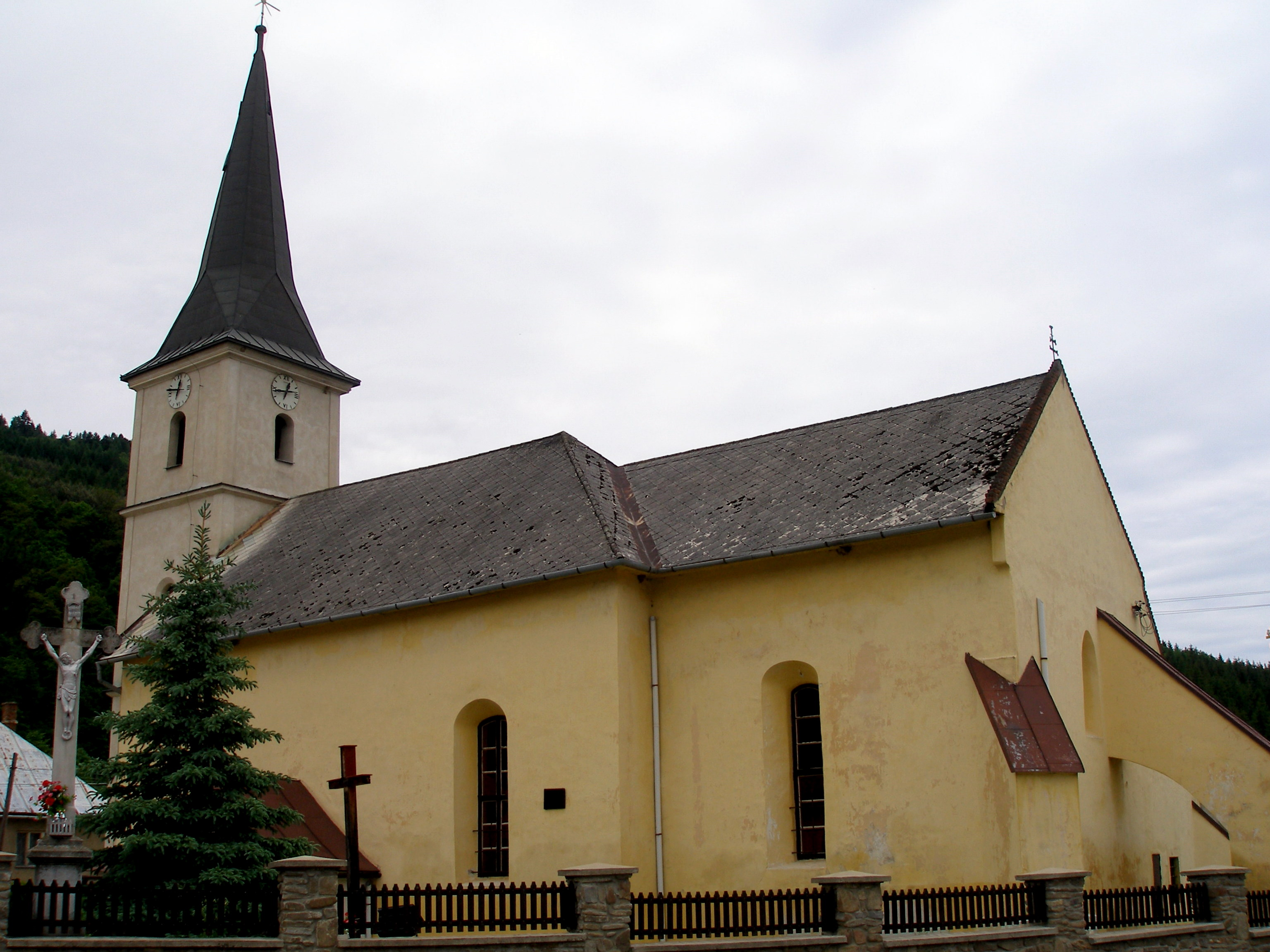

- Flag

- Location of Nižný Slavkov in the Prešov Region Location of Nižný Slavkov in Slovakia
- Coordinates: 49.10°N 20.85°E
- Country: Slovakia
- Region: Prešov Region
- District: Sabinov District
- First mentioned: 1289

Area
  - Total: 23.14 km^{2} (8.93 sq mi)
- Elevation: 511 m (1,677 ft)

Population (2025)
  - Total: 880
- Time zone: UTC+1 (CET)
  - Summer (DST): UTC+2 (CEST)
- Postal code: 827 5
- Area code: +421 51
- Vehicle registration plate (until 2022): SB
- Website: www.niznyslavkov.sk

Nižný Slavkov is a village and municipality in Sabinov District in the Prešov Region of north-eastern Slovakia.

== History ==
In historical records the village was first mentioned in 1214.

== Geography ==
The municipality lies at an altitude of 511 metres (1,677 ft) and covers an area of 23.14 km^{2} (8.93 sq mi) (2025).

== Population ==
Population statistic (10 years)
Year	1995	2005	2015	2025
Count	783	791	847	880
Difference		+1.02%	+7.07%	+3.89%

Population statistic
Year	2024	2025
Count	876	880
Difference		+0.45%

It has a population of 880 people (31 December 2025).

=== Ethnicity ===
Census 2021 (1+ %)
Ethnicity	Number	Fraction
Slovak	829	95.5%
Not found out	47	5.41%
Total	868	

In year 2021 was 868 people by ethnicity 829 as Slovak, 47 as Not found out, 2 as Romani, 1 as Czech, 1 as Irish, 1 as Rusyn and 1 as Moravian.

Note on population: The difference values of population numbers in the table "Population statistic" and in the sections "Ethnicity" & "Religion" is caused by the use of various statistical methods.

=== Religion ===
Census 2021 (1+ %)
Religion	Number	Fraction
Roman Catholic Church	779	89.75%
Not found out	36	4.15%
None	34	3.92%
Total	868	

In year 2021 was 868 people by religion 779 from Roman Catholic Church, 36 from Not found out, 34 from None, 8 from Greek Catholic Church, 5 from Apostolic Church, 3 from Ad hoc movements, 1 from Eastern Orthodox Church, 1 from Christian Congregations in Slovakia and 1 from Other.
