= Červenica pri Sabinove =

Village and municipality in Slovakia

- Municipality
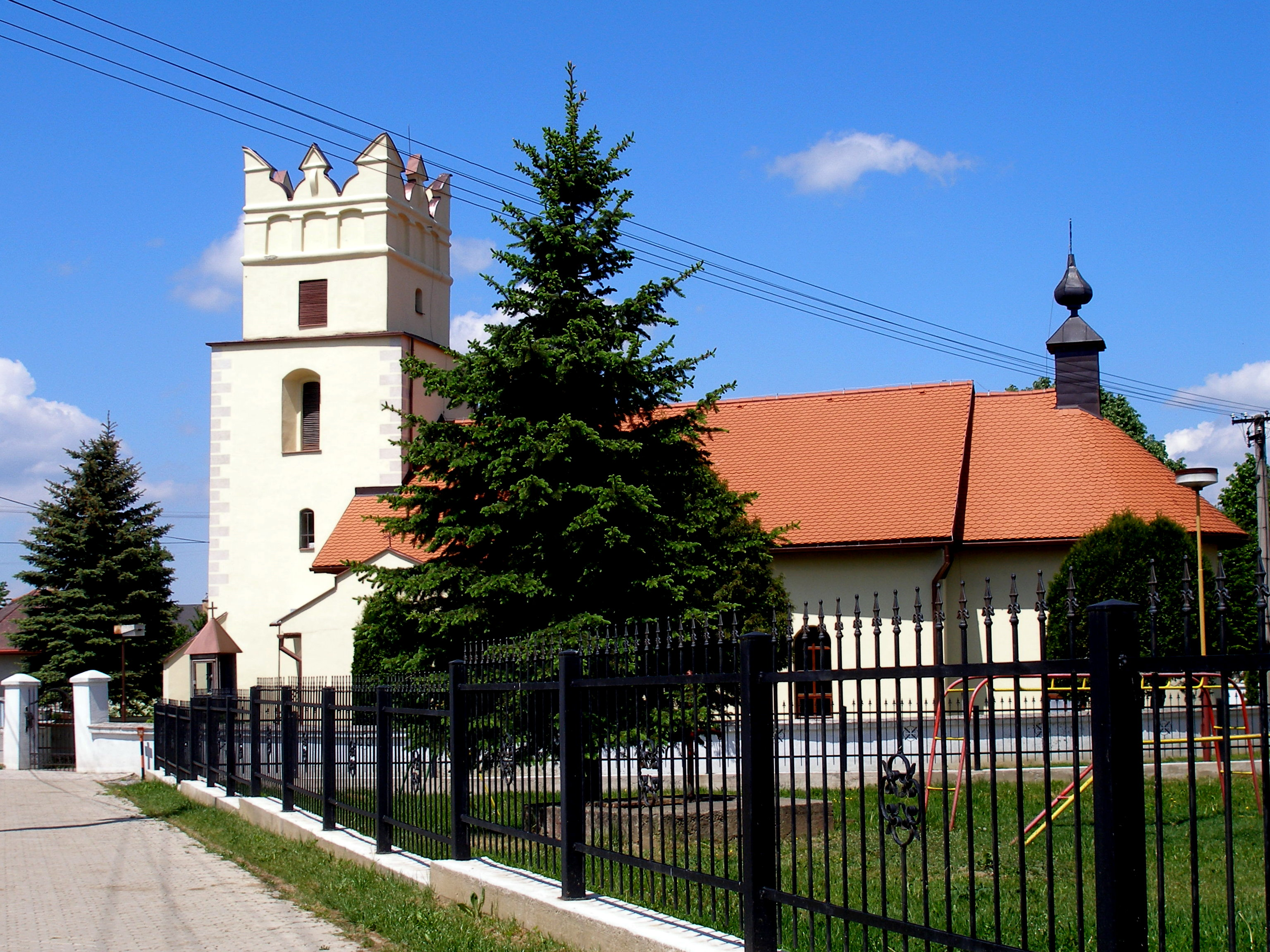

- Flag

- Location of Červenica pri Sabinove in the Prešov Region Location of Červenica pri Sabinove in Slovakia
- Coordinates: 49.13°N 21.02°E
- Country: Slovakia
- Region: Prešov Region
- District: Sabinov District
- First mentioned: 1278

Area
  - Total: 6.30 km^{2} (2.43 sq mi)
- Elevation: 356 m (1,168 ft)

Population (2025)
  - Total: 995
- Time zone: UTC+1 (CET)
  - Summer (DST): UTC+2 (CEST)
- Postal code: 825 6
- Area code: +421 51
- Vehicle registration plate (until 2022): SB
- Website: www.cervenica.eu/sk

Červenica pri Sabinove (Hungarian: Vörösalma) is a village and municipality in Sabinov District in the Prešov Region of north-eastern Slovakia.

== History ==
In historical records the village was first mentioned in 1278.

== Geography ==
The municipality lies at an altitude of 356 metres (1,168 ft) and covers an area of 6.30 km^{2} (2.43 sq mi) (2025).

== Population ==
Population statistic (10 years)
Year	1995	2005	2015	2025
Count	710	790	883	995
Difference		+11.26%	+11.77%	+12.68%

Population statistic
Year	2024	2025
Count	969	995
Difference		+2.68%

It has a population of 995 people (31 December 2025).

=== Ethnicity ===
Census 2021 (1+ %)
Ethnicity	Number	Fraction
Slovak	900	96.56%
Not found out	30	3.21%
Total	932	

In year 2021 was 932 people by ethnicity 900 as Slovak, 30 as Not found out, 6 as Czech, 4 as Rusyn and 1 as Greek.

Note on population: The difference values of population numbers in the table "Population statistic" and in the sections "Ethnicity" & "Religion" is caused by the use of various statistical methods.

=== Religion ===
Census 2021 (1+ %)
Religion	Number	Fraction
Roman Catholic Church	806	86.48%
Greek Catholic Church	66	7.08%
None	30	3.22%
Not found out	26	2.79%
Total	932	

In year 2021 was 932 people by religion 806 from Roman Catholic Church, 66 from Greek Catholic Church, 30 from None, 26 from Not found out, 3 from Evangelical Church and 1 from Ad hoc movements.

== Genealogical resources ==
The records for genealogical research are available at the state archive "Statny Archiv in Presov, Slovakia"

- Roman Catholic church records (births/marriages/deaths): 1716-1901 (parish B)
- Greek Catholic church records (births/marriages/deaths): 1786-1895 (parish B)

== See also ==
- List of municipalities and towns in Slovakia
