= Lucka (disambiguation) =

Lucka is a town in Germany.

Lucka may also refer to several other places in central Europe:

== Poland ==
- Łucka
- Łucka Kolonia

== See also ==
- Lúčka, several places in Slovakia
