= Lúčka =

Lúčka may refer to several places in Slovakia.

- Lúčka, Levoča District
- Lúčka, Rožňava District
- Lúčka, Sabinov District
- Lúčka, Svidník District
