= Baranówka, Lublin Voivodeship =

Baranówka
- Village
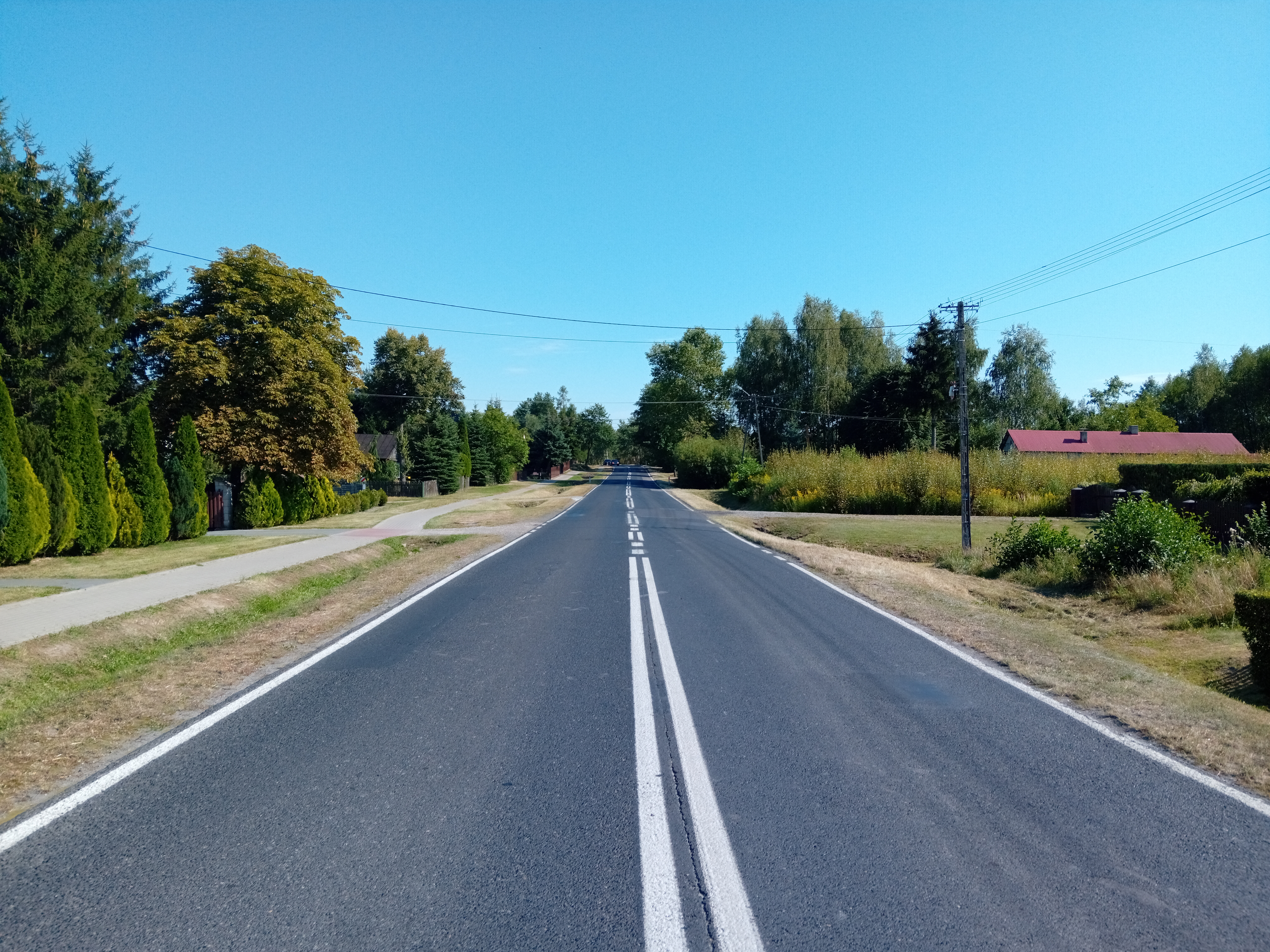
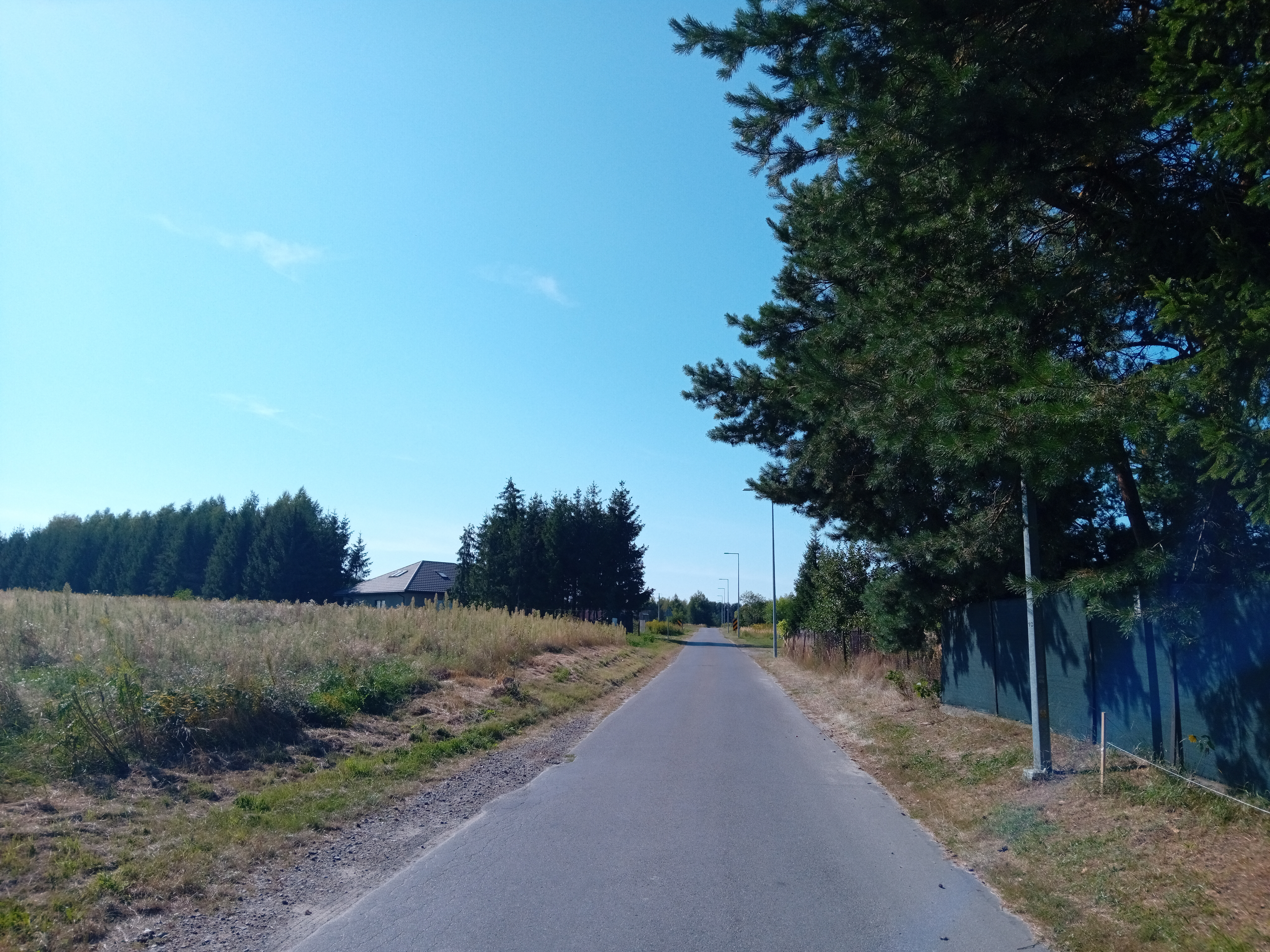
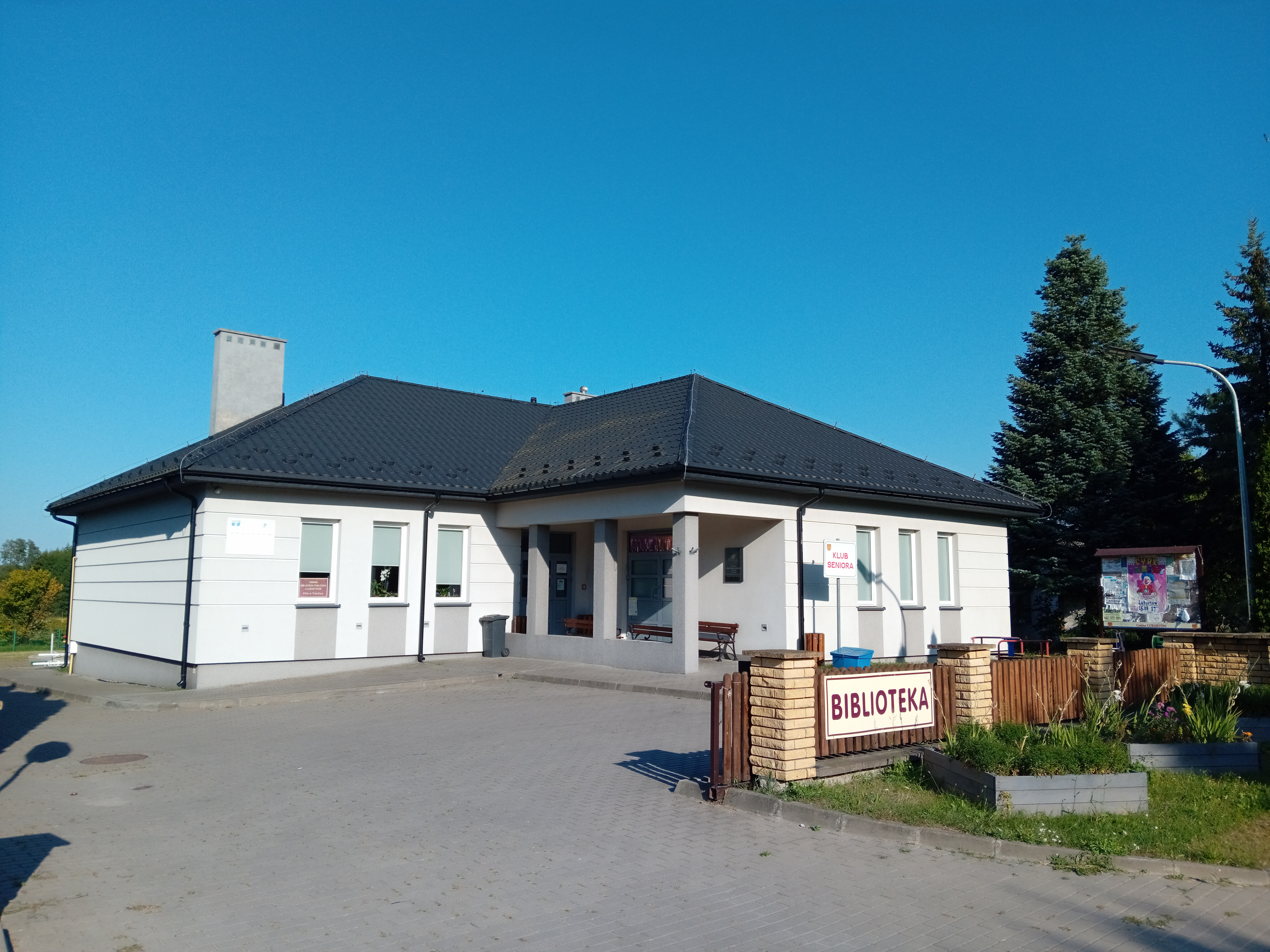
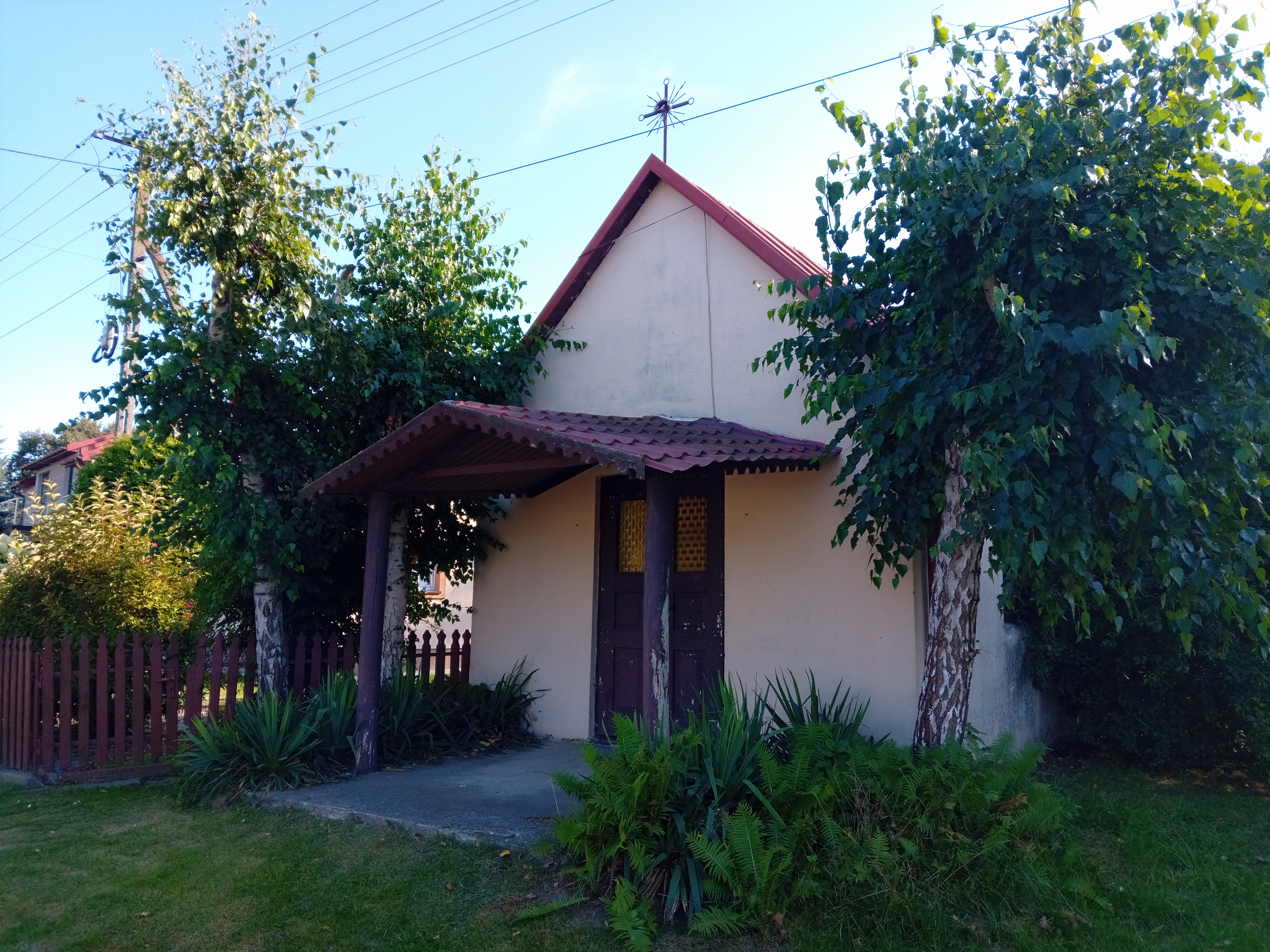
- Voivodeship road 829 Road to Trzciniec Library and Senior Centre Chapel in Baranówka

- Location within Poland
- Coordinates: 51°24′54″N 22°39′40″E
- Country: Poland
- Voivodeship: Lublin
- County: Lubartów
- Gmina: Lubartów

Baranówka [baraˈnufka] is a village in the administrative district of Gmina Lubartów, within Lubartów County, Lublin Voivodeship, in eastern Poland.
