= Rokitno =

Rokitno may refer to the following places:

- the Rokitno or Pripet Marshes, now in Belarus and Ukraine
- Rokitno, Gmina Rokitno, Biała County in Lublin Voivodeship (east Poland)
- Rokitno, Lubartów County in Lublin Voivodeship (east Poland)
- Rokitno, Gmina Ulhówek, Tomaszów County in Lublin Voivodeship (east Poland)
- Rokitno, Masovian Voivodeship (east-central Poland)
- Rokitno, Silesian Voivodeship (south Poland)
- Rokitno, Międzyrzecz County in Lubusz Voivodeship (west Poland)
- Rokitno, Strzelce-Drezdenko County in Lubusz Voivodeship (west Poland)
- Rokitno, West Pomeranian Voivodeship (north-west Poland)

== See also ==
- Rokytne (disambiguation)
