= Szczekarków =

Szczekarków may refer to the following places:

- Szczekarków, Lubartów County in Lublin Voivodeship (east Poland)
- Szczekarków, Gmina Wilków in Opole County, Lublin Voivodeship (east Poland)
