= Kamenica, Sabinov District =

Kamenica
- Municipality
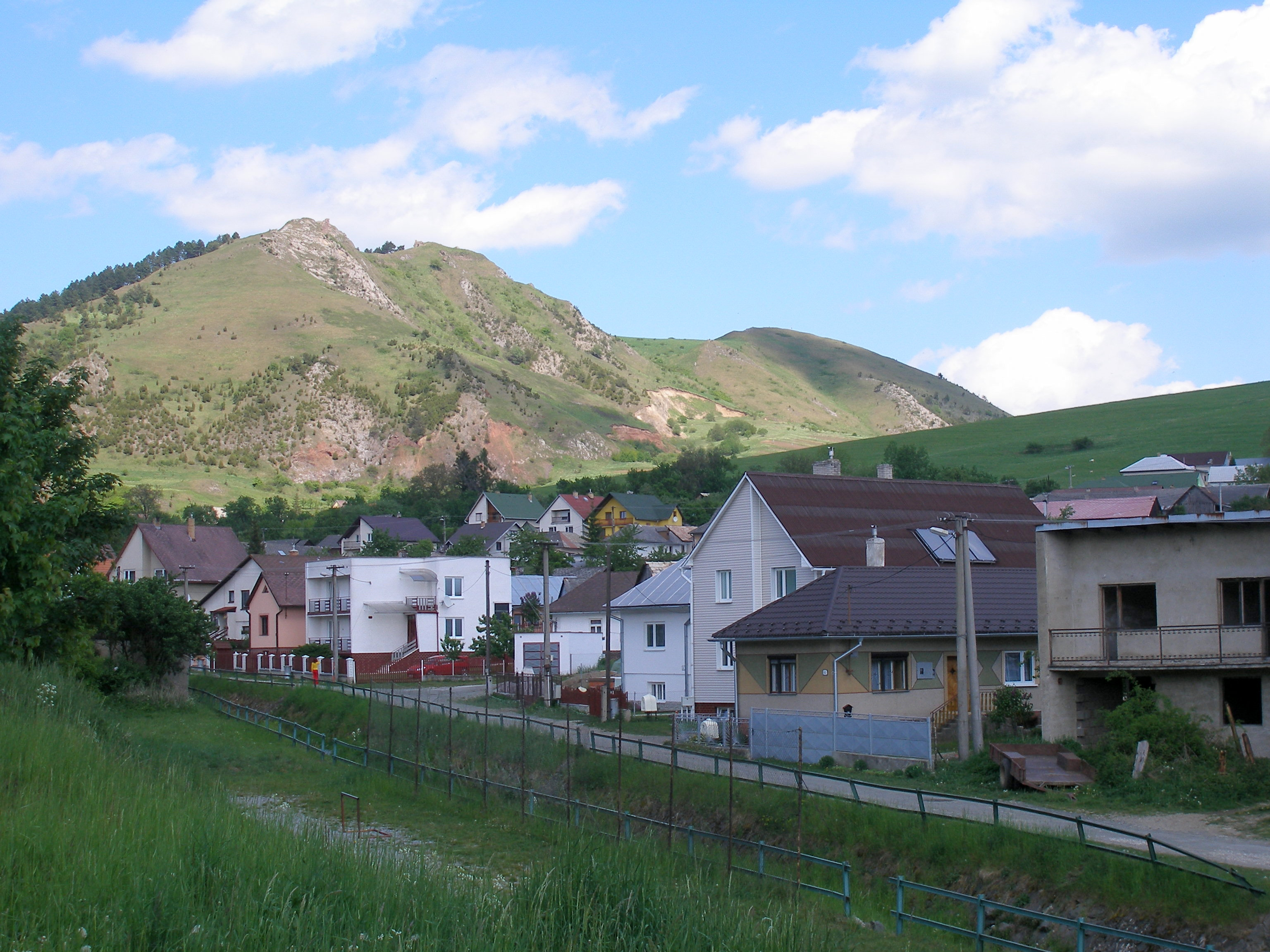
- The village church with ruins of Kamenicky hrad in the background.

- Flag

- Location of Kamenica in the Prešov Region Location of Kamenica in Slovakia
- Coordinates: 49.19°N 20.96°E
- Country: Slovakia
- Region: Prešov Region
- District: Sabinov District
- First mentioned: 1248

Government
  - Mayor: Peter Vandžura

Area
  - Total: 21.29 km^{2} (8.22 sq mi)
- Elevation: 483 m (1,585 ft)

Population (2025)
  - Total: 1,784
- Time zone: UTC+1 (CET)
  - Summer (DST): UTC+2 (CEST)
- Postal code: 828 1
- Area code: +421 51
- Vehicle registration plate (until 2022): SB
- Website: www.kamenica.sk/sk

Kamenica (Hungarian: Tarkő, (earlier) Tarkeő, Kamenyica) is a village and municipality in Sabinov District in the Prešov Region of north-eastern Slovakia.

== History ==
The Castle

Kamenica first developed out of the castle of the same name that was built on a nearby hillock in the early 13th century in order to protect a major Polish trading route that had its terminus in Košice to the south. In 1436, the castle garrison rebelled and was quickly brought back under control, but not long after the Hussites had control of both castle and village. The castle was refurbished in the Renaissance style in the beginning of the 16th century. In 1556 imperial troops besieged under command of Simon Forgacs, captured and seven days later, on the order of Emperor Ferdinand I, turned the castle into the ruin that can be seen today. After the sack of the castle the surrounding villages including Kamenica dwindled in size. Later, stones from the castle were used to build a brewery in Lúčka in 1816.

The Village

The village itself was first mentioned in 1248 as “Tharkveley,” (An early form of the Hungarian name for the village, Tarkő). In 1270, King Stephen V along with his estates conferred Kamenica and its castle on Nicholas Berzeviczi, a keen supporter of the King. Stephen V died in 1272, jeopardizing the Berzeviczi family holding. The new King Ladislaus IV of Hungary, however, re-confirmed the holding in 1275 and reconfirmed in a charter signed in Eger in 1287. The church of Kamenica was built around 1300 in the Gothic style by Count Rikolf Berzeviczi and the first noted priest is a man named Gottfrid in 1330. After the troubles of the 1436 revolt and the Hussite struggles, the village hit on hard times. The Berzeviczi family had already waned in power and the Sztáray clan had taken over, but by the mid-16th century the Dessewffy family had control over the village and the ruins of the castle. As of 1600, the village consisted of 31 households. After the Dessewffy family took over, the Lutheran church was shut down and a Catholic-only church returned in 1672 in an expanded Baroque style though it was still affiliated with the neighboring parish and not a parish of its own. In the 1680s, the village church was once more given its own parish, which did not move after 1741.

The village continued to grow and in 1787, the village’s 627 residents lived in 93 different houses. In 1804, the church was renovated once again and completed in the neoclassical style. By 1828, there were 740 inhabitants living in 97 houses. Most residents were occupied in farming, weaving, woodcutting and animal husbandry. The village in 1910 reached 974, predominantly Slovak, inhabitants. After the Treaty of Trianon was signed in 1920, Kamenica became a part of Czechoslovakia. During that same decade many villagers emigrated due to economic difficulties, many to the United States.

== Geography ==
The municipality lies at an altitude of 483 metres (1,585 ft) and covers an area of 21.29 km^{2} (8.22 sq mi) (2025).

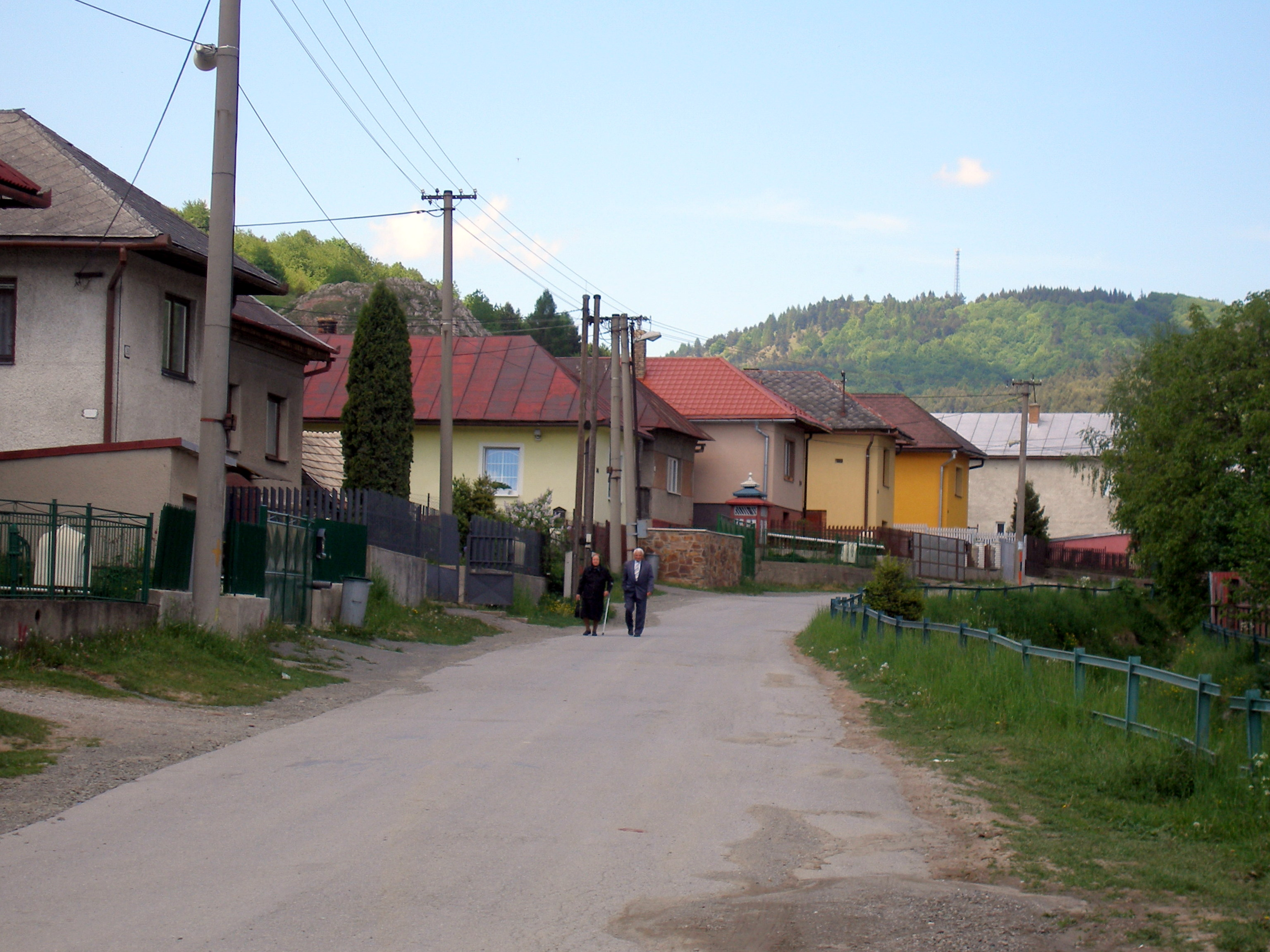
Houses along the main street in the village.

== Population ==
Population statistic (10 years)
| Year | 1995 | 2005 | 2015 | 2025 |
|---|---|---|---|---|
| Count | 1815 | 1861 | 1816 | 1784 |
| Difference | | +2.53% | −2.41% | −1.76% |

Population statistic
| Year | 2024 | 2025 |
|---|---|---|
| Count | 1791 | 1784 |
| Difference | | −0.39% |

It has a population of 1784 people (31 December 2025).

=== Ethnicity ===
Census 2021 (1+ %)
| Ethnicity | Number | Fraction |
|---|---|---|
| Slovak | 1794 | 99.55% |
| Not found out | 19 | 1.05% |
| Total | 1802 | |

In year 2021 was 1802 people by ethnicity 1794 as Slovak, 19 as Not found out, 13 as Rusyn, 3 as Czech, 3 as Ukrainian, 3 as Other, 2 as Russian and 1 as Romani.

Note on population: The difference values of population numbers in the table "Population statistic" and in the sections "Ethnicity" & "Religion" is caused by the use of various statistical methods.

=== Religion ===
Census 2021 (1+ %)
| Religion | Number | Fraction |
|---|---|---|
| Roman Catholic Church | 1695 | 94.06% |
| None | 51 | 2.83% |
| Greek Catholic Church | 43 | 2.39% |
| Total | 1802 | |

In year 2021 was 1802 people by religion 1695 from Roman Catholic Church, 51 from None, 43 from Greek Catholic Church, 4 from Eastern Orthodox Church, 4 from Not found out, 1 from Paganism and natural spirituality, 1 from Other and not ascertained christian church, 1 from Christian Congregations in Slovakia, 1 from Evangelical Church and 1 from Buddhism.

== Genealogical resources ==
The records for genealogical research are available at the state archive "Statny Archiv in Presov, Slovakia"

- Roman Catholic church records (births/marriages/deaths): 1776-1895 (parish A)
- Greek Catholic church records (births/marriages/deaths): 1815-1952 (parish B)

== See also ==
- List of municipalities and towns in Slovakia
