= Battle of Lubartów (1863) =

European military conflict

- Part of the January Uprising
Date	22–23 January 1863
Location	Lubartów 51°27′44″N 22°36′31″E
Result	Russian victory

Belligerents
(Poland) Polish insurgents	Russian Empire
- Location within Poland

The Battle of Lubartów, which took place on the night of 22–23 January 1863, was one of the first battles of the January Uprising. Several hundred Polish insurgents, mostly scythemen and some armed with sticks, planned to attack the town of Lubartów, Congress Poland, which was garrisoned by the Imperial Russian Army. Furthermore, the Poles wanted to capture the nearby hamlet of Skrobów, where Russian artillery cannons were kept.

The attack on Skrobów failed, and Russian sentries, who fled to Lubartów, warned their officers. The insurgents thus lost the element of surprise, and their action was repulsed. After losing some men, the rebels withdrew to the nearby forests.

== Sources ==
- J. Tomczyk, Lubartów w powstaniu styczniowym, [w:] Lubartów.
