= Annobór-Piaski =

Polish village near Lubartów in Lublin Voivodeship

- Village
- Location within Poland
- Coordinates: 51°25′17.22″N 22°34′53.49″E
- Country: Poland
- Voivodeship: Lublin
- County: Lubartów
- Gmina: Lubartów

Annobór-Piaski (Polish pronunciation: [aˈnːɔbur ˈpjaskʲi]) is a village in east Poland near Lubartów in Gmina Lubartów, Lubartów County in Lublin Voivodeship.
