= Rokytne =

Rokytne can refer to several places in Ukraine:

- Rokytne, Kyiv Oblast, an urban-type settlement in Kyiv Oblast
- Rokytne, Rivne Oblast, an urban-type settlement in Rivne Oblast
- Rokytne, Chernivtsi Oblast, a village in Chernivtsi Oblast

Rokytne Raion may refer to:

- Rokytne Raion, Kyiv Oblast, Ukraine
- Rokytne Raion, Rivne Oblast, Ukraine

== See also ==
- Rokitno (disambiguation)
