= Trójnia =

- Village
- Location within Poland
- Coordinates: 51°32′N 22°35′E
- Country: Poland
- Voivodeship: Lublin
- County: Lubartów
- Gmina: Lubartów

Trójnia [ˈtrui̯ɲa] is a village in the administrative district of Gmina Lubartów, within Lubartów County, Lublin Voivodeship, in eastern Poland.
