= Wandzin, Lubartów County =

Wandzin
- Village
- Location within Poland
- Coordinates: 51°24′19″N 22°36′40″E
- Country: Poland
- Voivodeship: Lublin
- County: Lubartów
- Gmina: Lubartów
- Population (approx.): 220

Wandzin [ˈvand͡ʑin] is a village in the administrative district of Gmina Lubartów, within Lubartów County, Lublin Voivodeship, in eastern Poland.
