= Skrobów-Kolonia =

- Colony
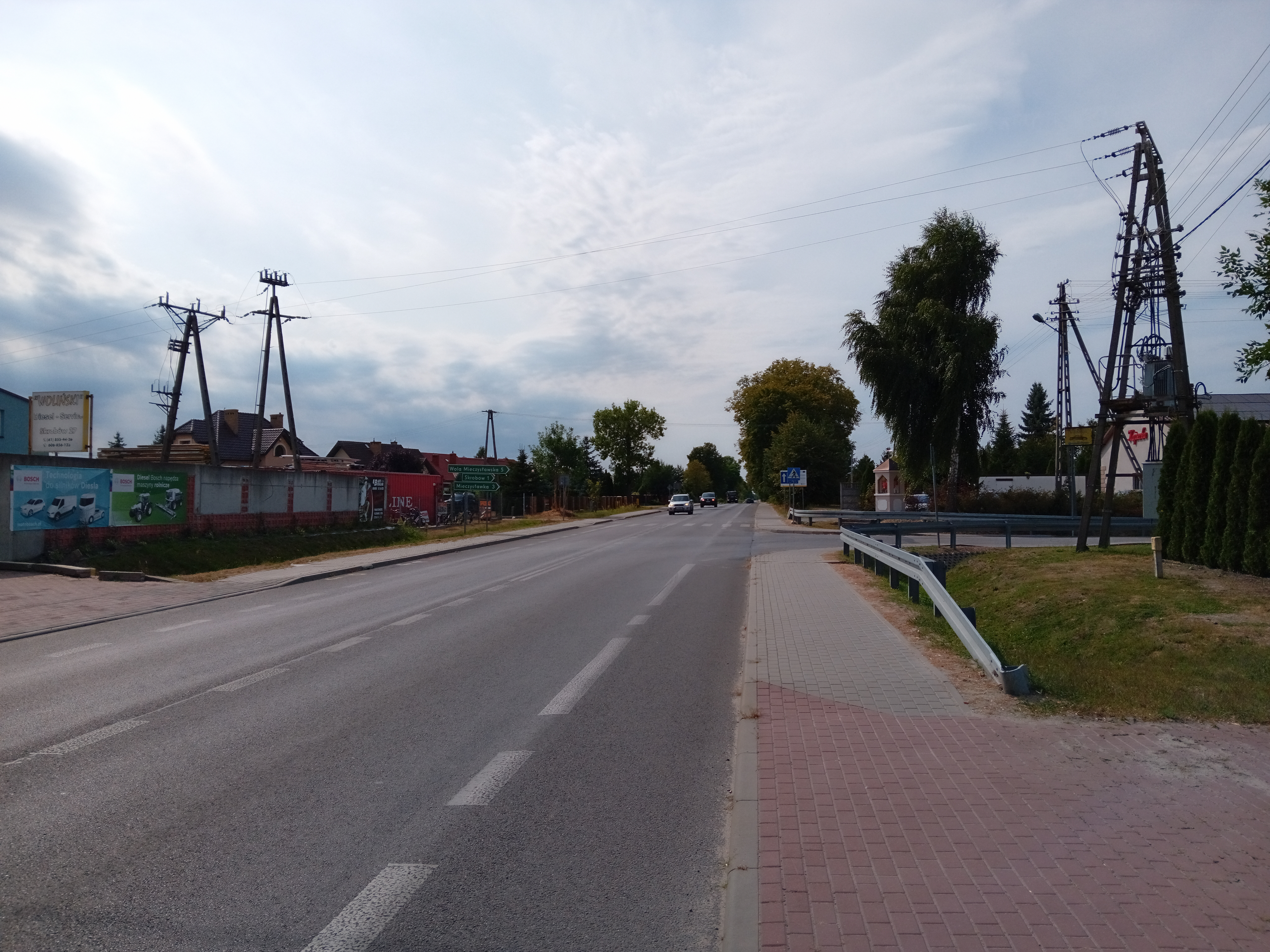
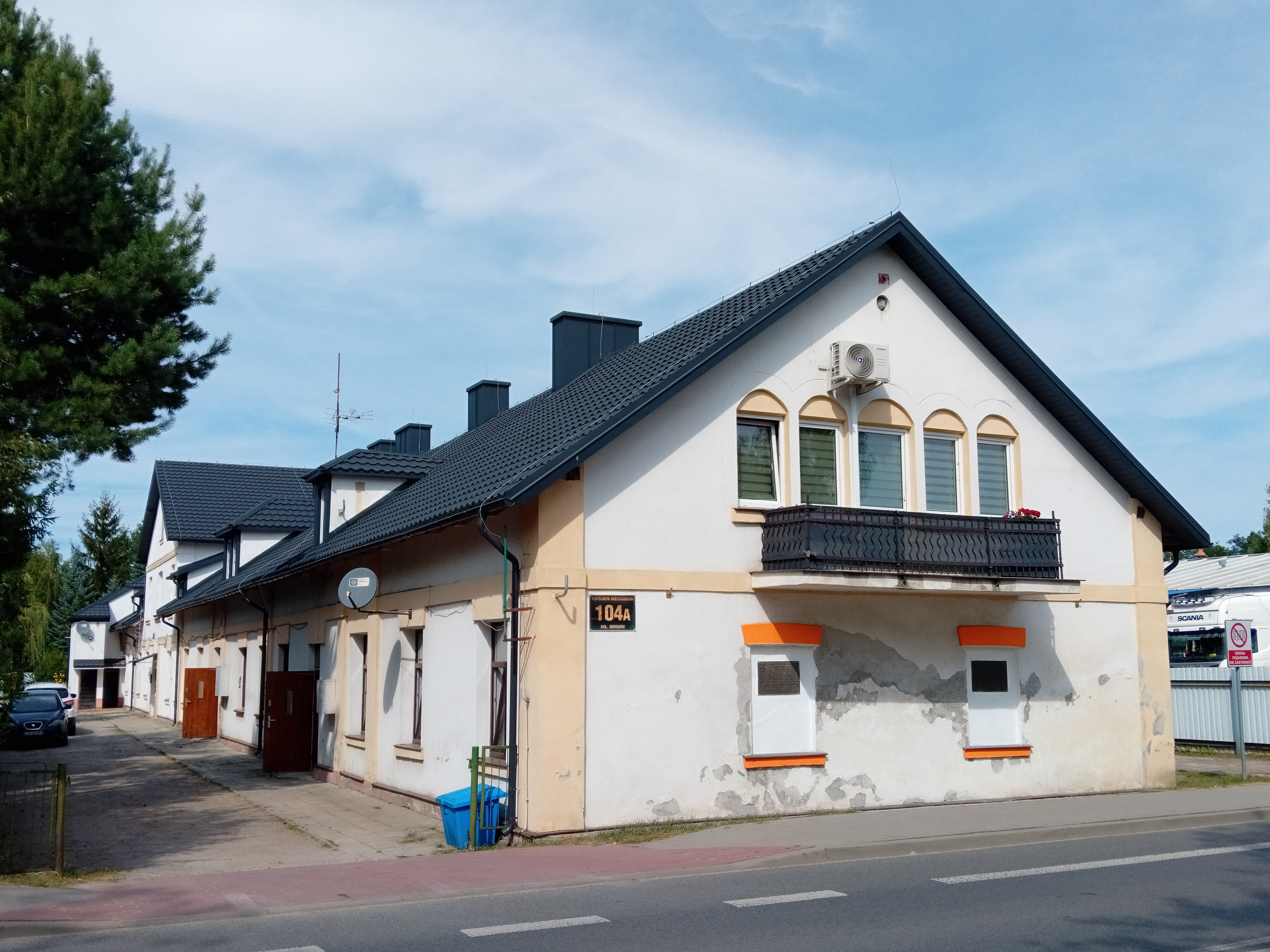
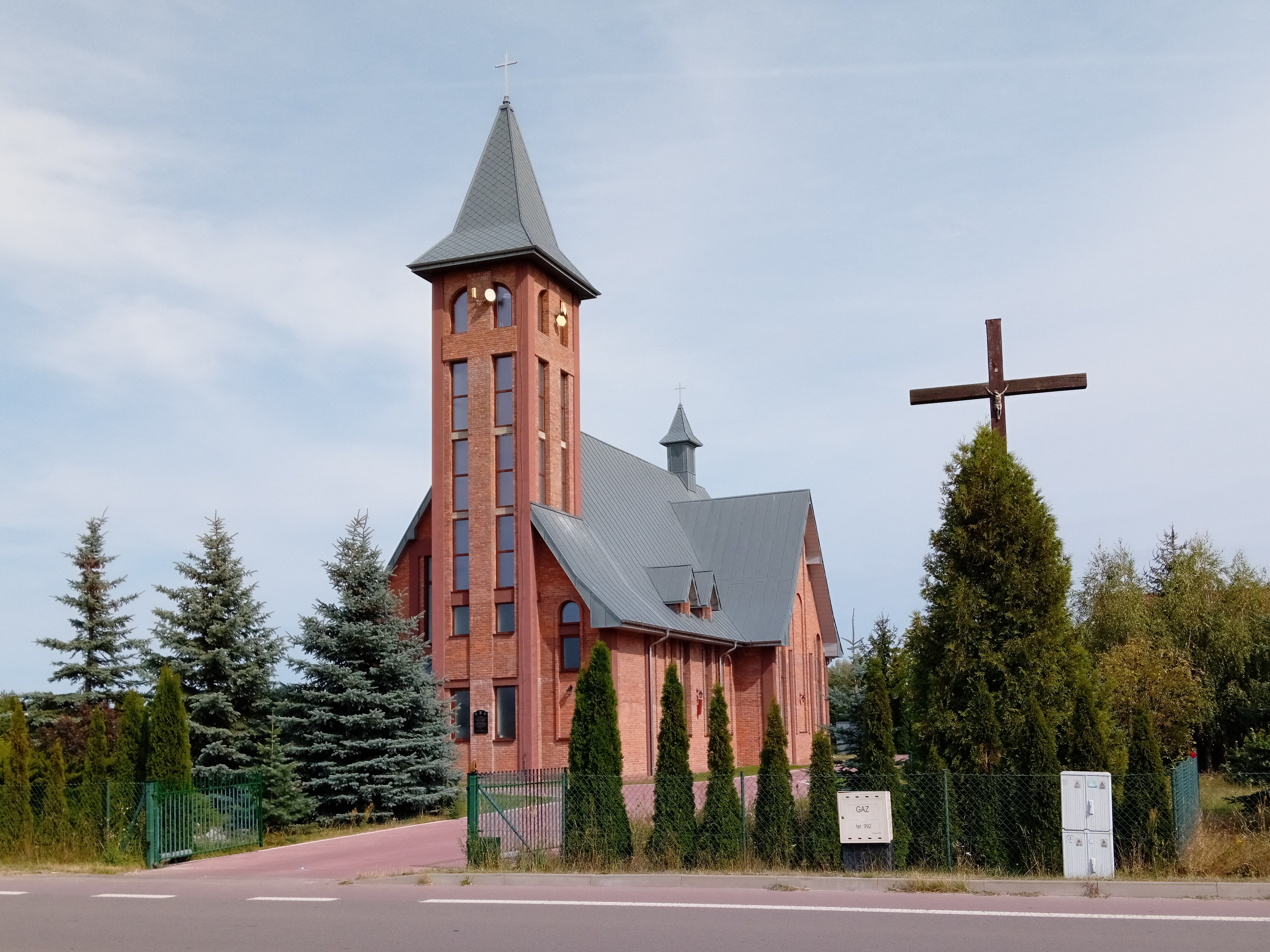
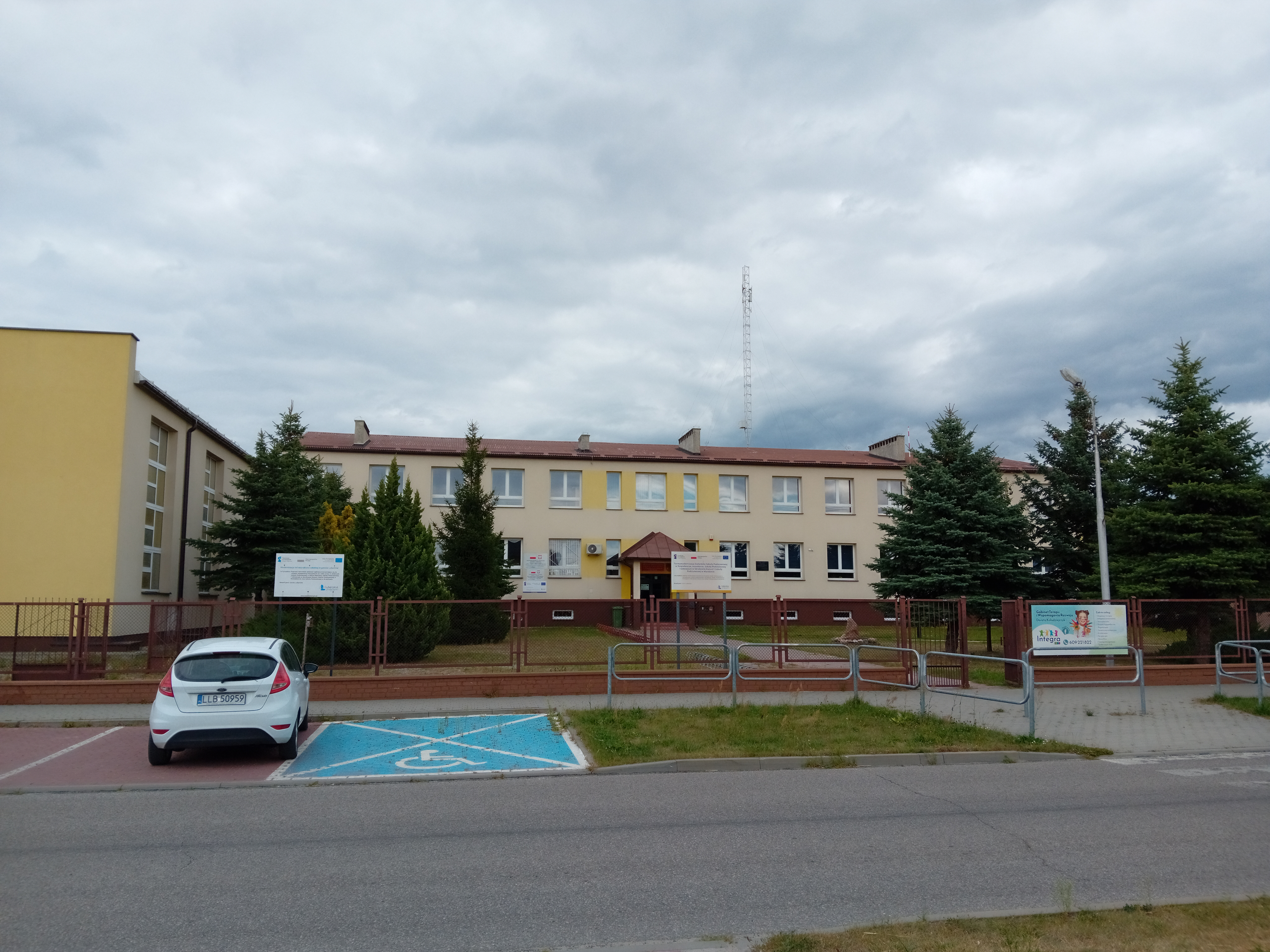
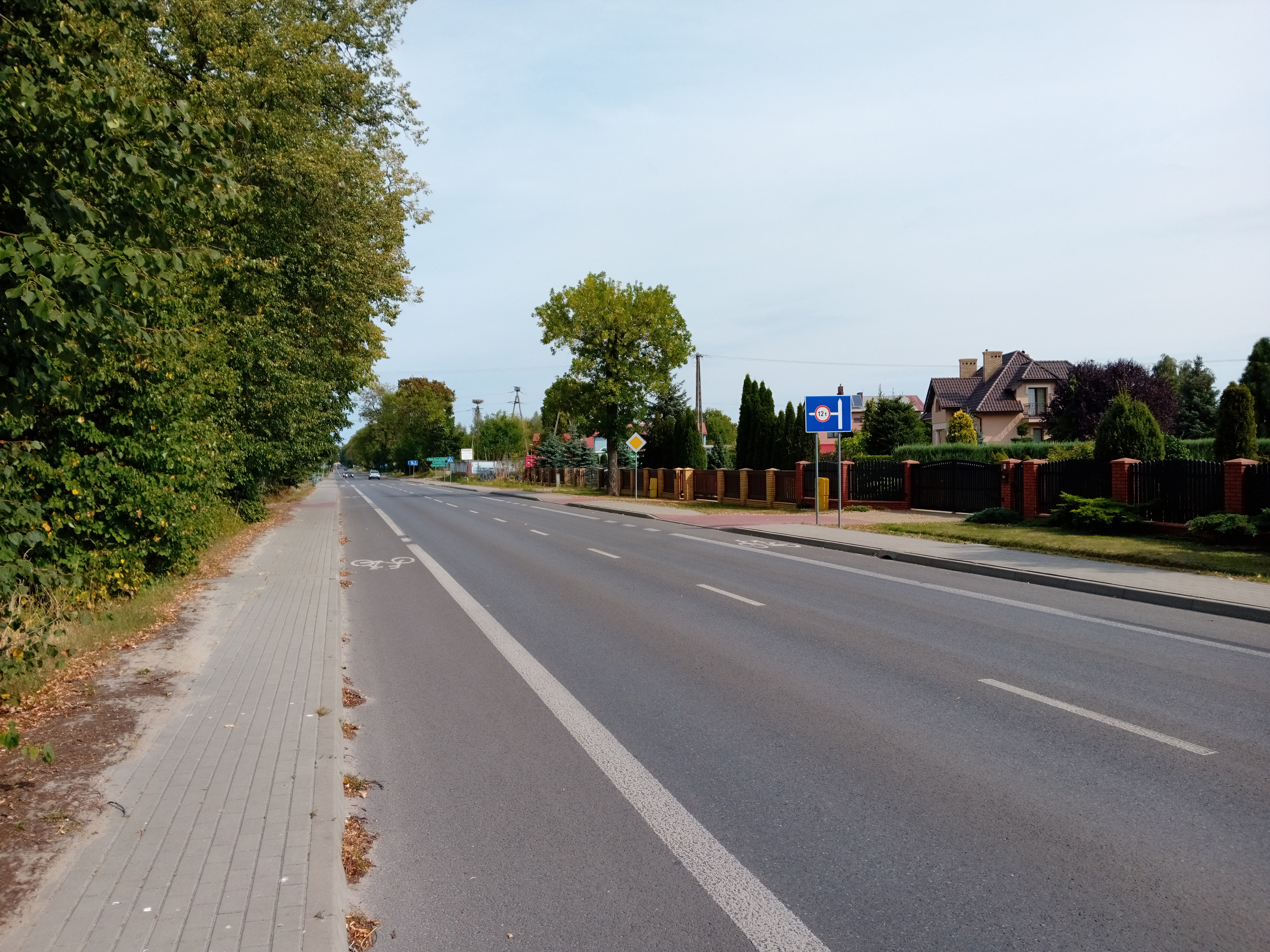
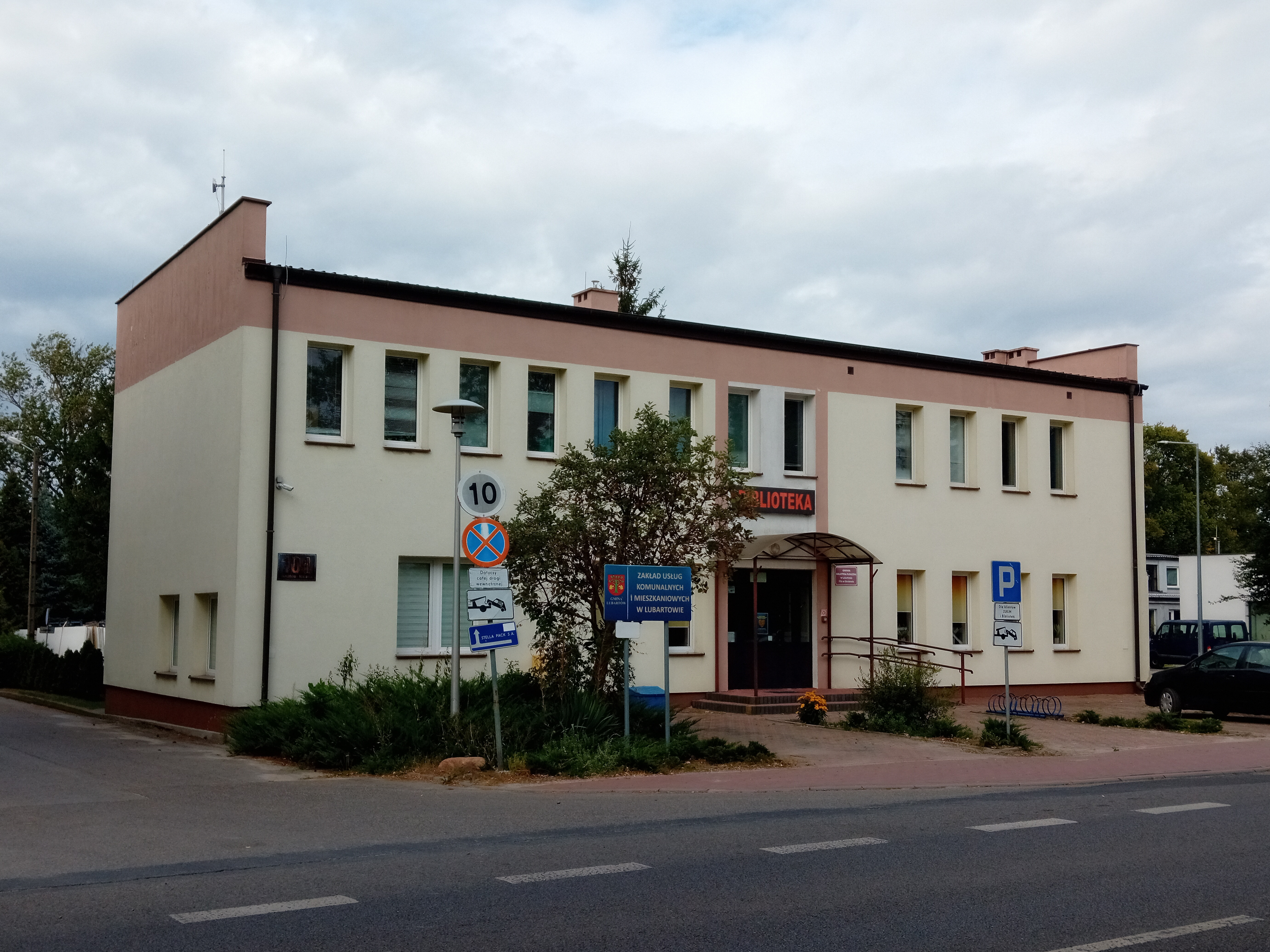
- The centre of the settlement Former Skrobów NKVD Camp Christ the Redeemer Church 27th Volhynian Infantry Division of the Home Army Primary School Lubartów-Kamionka Road Municipal and Housing Services Department and a library building

- Location within Poland
- Coordinates: 51°28′00″N 22°32′52″E
- Country: Poland
- Voivodeship: Lublin
- County: Lubartów
- Gmina: Lubartów

Skrobów-Kolonia [ˈskrɔbuf kɔˈlɔɲa] is a colony in the administrative district of Gmina Lubartów, within Lubartów County, Lublin Voivodeship, in eastern Poland.
