= Nowodwór, Lubartów County =

Nowodwór
- Village
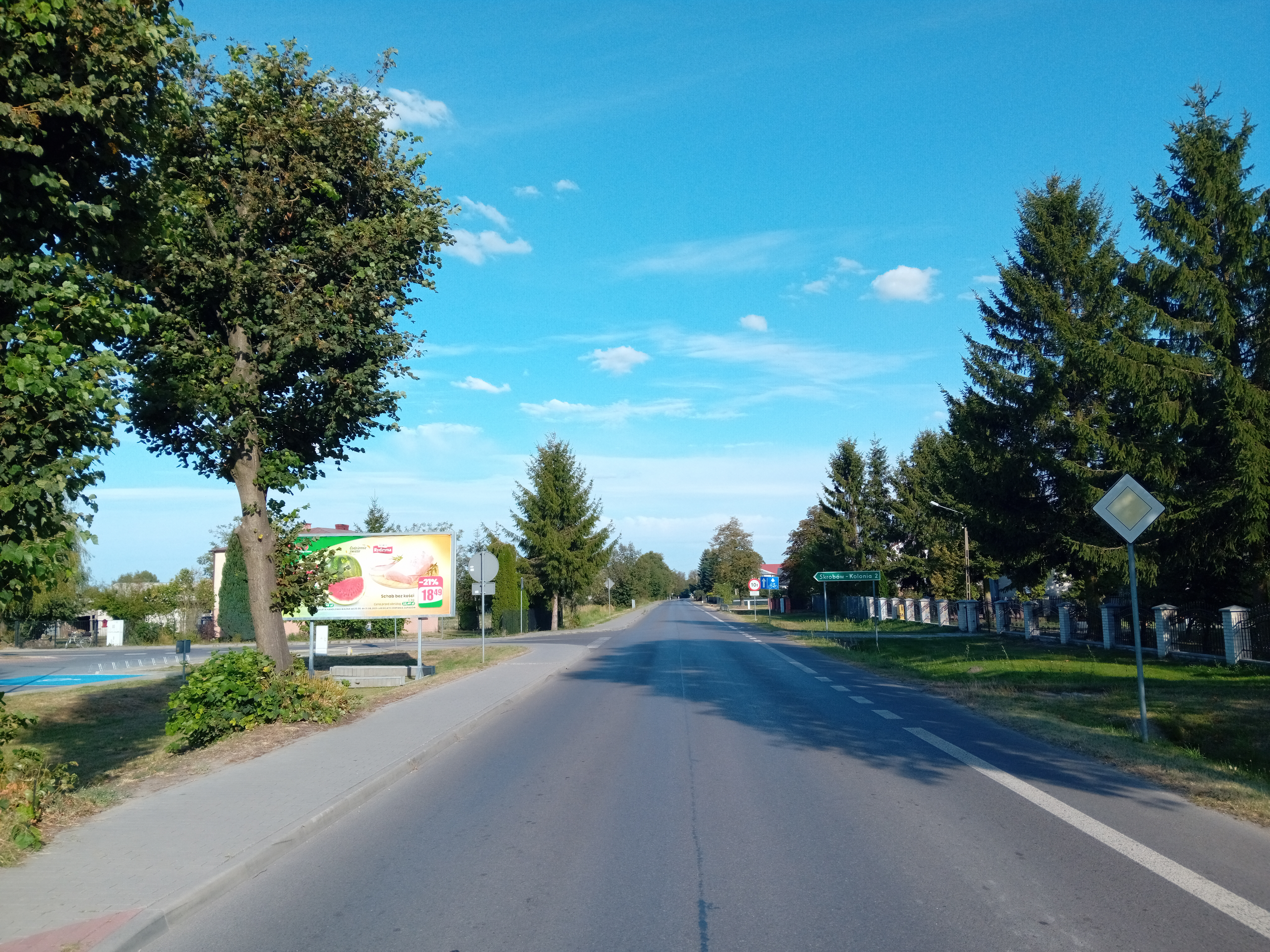
- Centre of the village

- Location within Poland
- Coordinates: 51°26′33″N 22°32′13″E
- Country: Poland
- Voivodeship: Lublin
- County: Lubartów
- Gmina: Lubartów

Population
  - Total: 800

Nowodwór [nɔˈvɔdvur] is a village in the administrative district of Gmina Lubartów, within Lubartów County, Lublin Voivodeship, in eastern Poland.
