= Nowodwór-Piaski =

- Village
- Location within Poland
- Coordinates: 51°26′33″N 22°34′3″E
- Country: Poland
- Voivodeship: Lublin
- County: Lubartów
- Gmina: Lubartów

Nowodwór-Piaski (Polish pronunciation: [nɔˈvɔdvur ˈpjaskʲi]) is a village in the administrative district of Gmina Lubartów, within Lubartów County, Lublin Voivodeship, in eastern Poland.

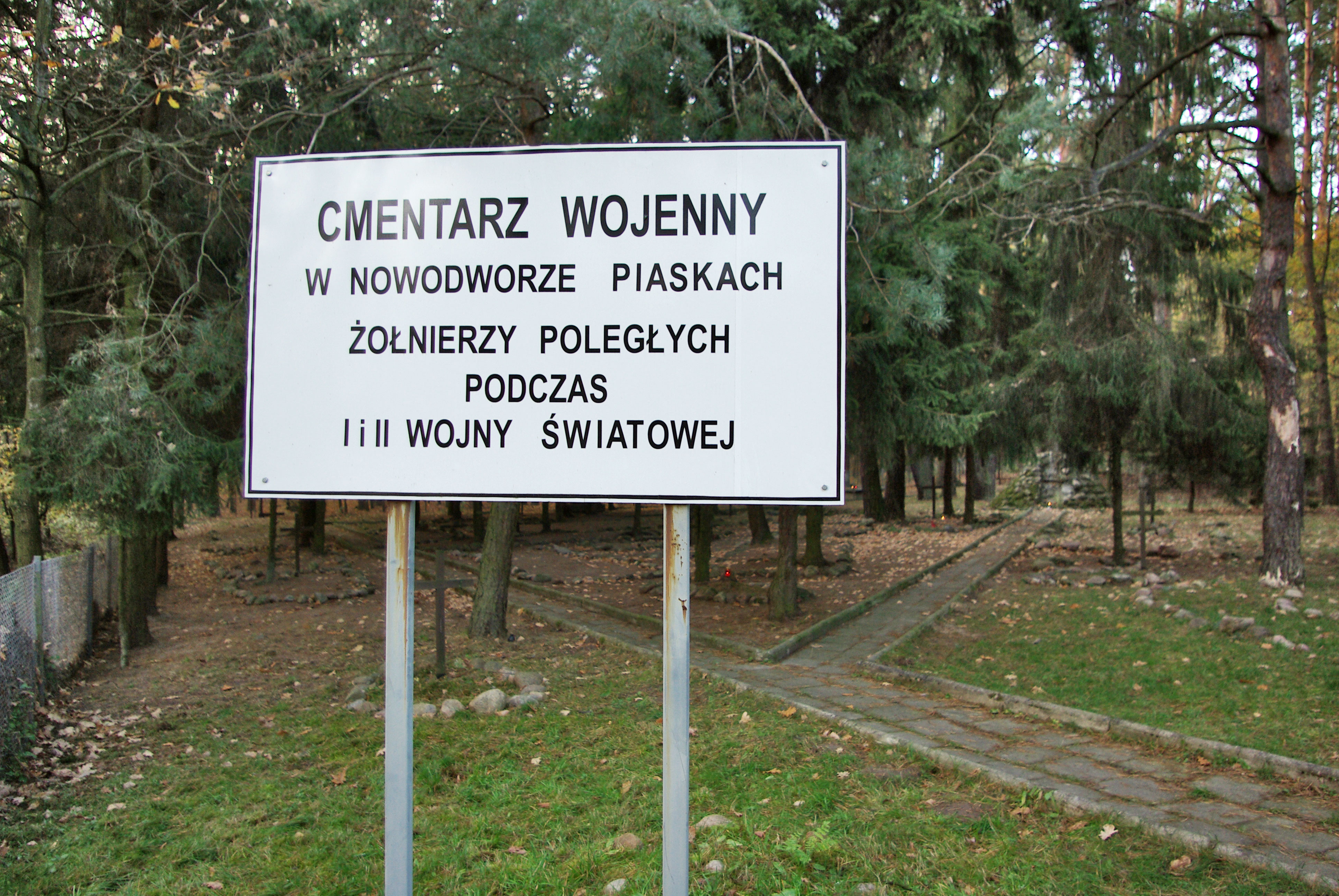
Military cemetery
