= Lisów, Lublin Voivodeship =

Lisów
- Village
- Location within Poland
- Coordinates: 51°25′17″N 22°34′53″E
- Country: Poland
- Voivodeship: Lublin
- County: Lubartów
- Gmina: Lubartów
- Population (approx.): 951
- Website: http://lisowsquad.webpark.pl

Lisów [ˈlisuf] is a village in the administrative district of Gmina Lubartów, within Lubartów County, Lublin Voivodeship, in eastern Poland.
