= Wólka Rokicka-Kolonia =

- Village
- Location within Poland
- Coordinates: 51°24′22″N 22°39′54″E
- Country: Poland
- Voivodeship: Lublin
- County: Lubartów
- Gmina: Lubartów

Wólka Rokicka-Kolonia [ˈvulka rɔˈkit͡ska kɔˈlɔɲa] is a village in the administrative district of Gmina Lubartów, within Lubartów County, Lublin Voivodeship, in eastern Poland.
