= Wólka Rokicka =

- Village
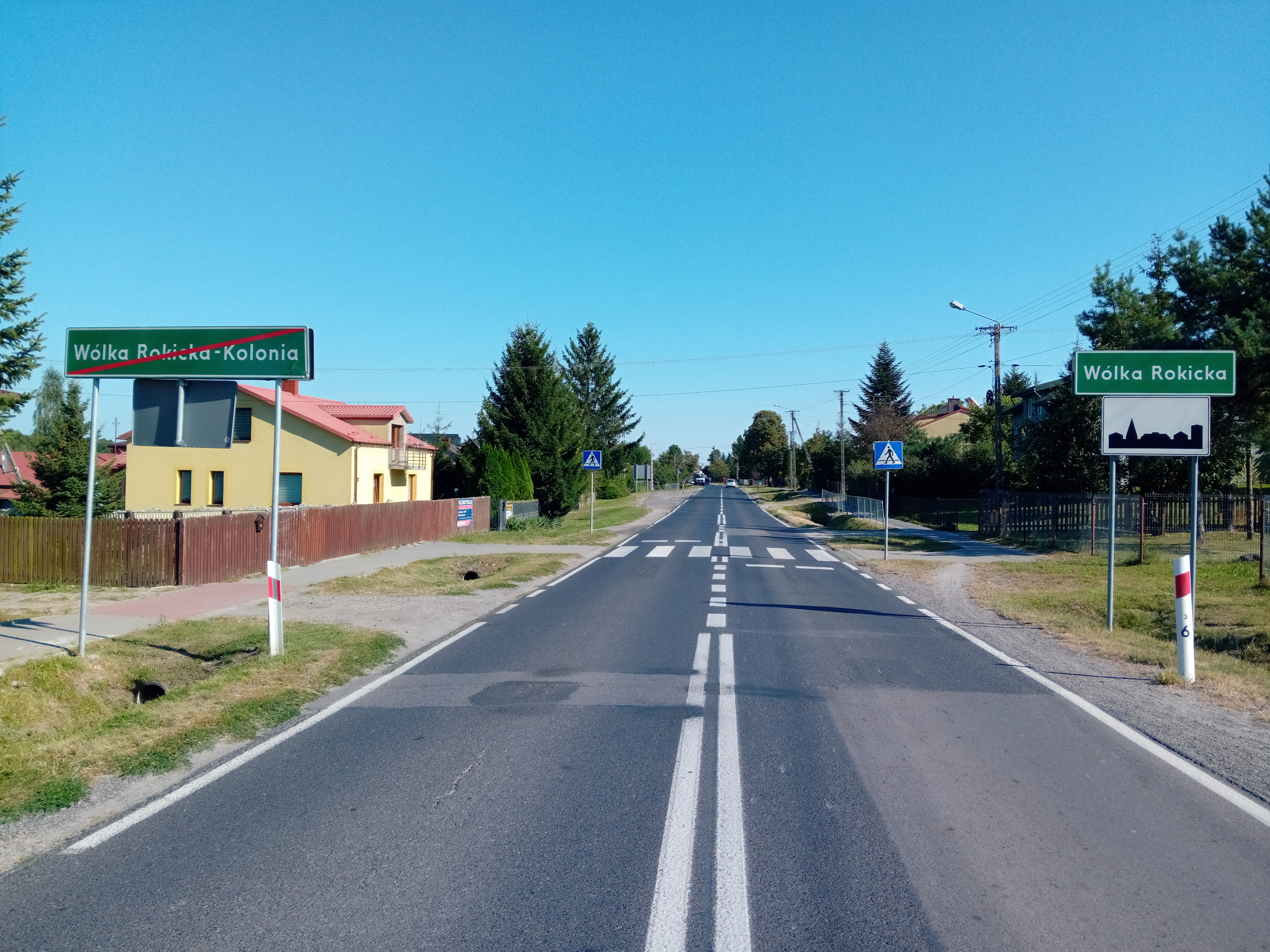
- Entrance to the village from the northeast (from Wólka Rokicka-Kolonia) via Voivodeship road 829

- Location within Poland
- Coordinates: 51°24′N 22°41′E
- Country: Poland
- Voivodeship: Lublin
- County: Lubartów
- Gmina: Lubartów
- Time zone: UTC+1 (CET)
  - Summer (DST): UTC+2 (CEST)

Wólka Rokicka [ˈvulka rɔˈkit͡ska] is a village in the administrative district of Gmina Lubartów, within Lubartów County, Lublin Voivodeship, in eastern Poland.

== History ==
Three Polish citizens were murdered by Nazi Germany in the village during World War II.

== Gallery ==
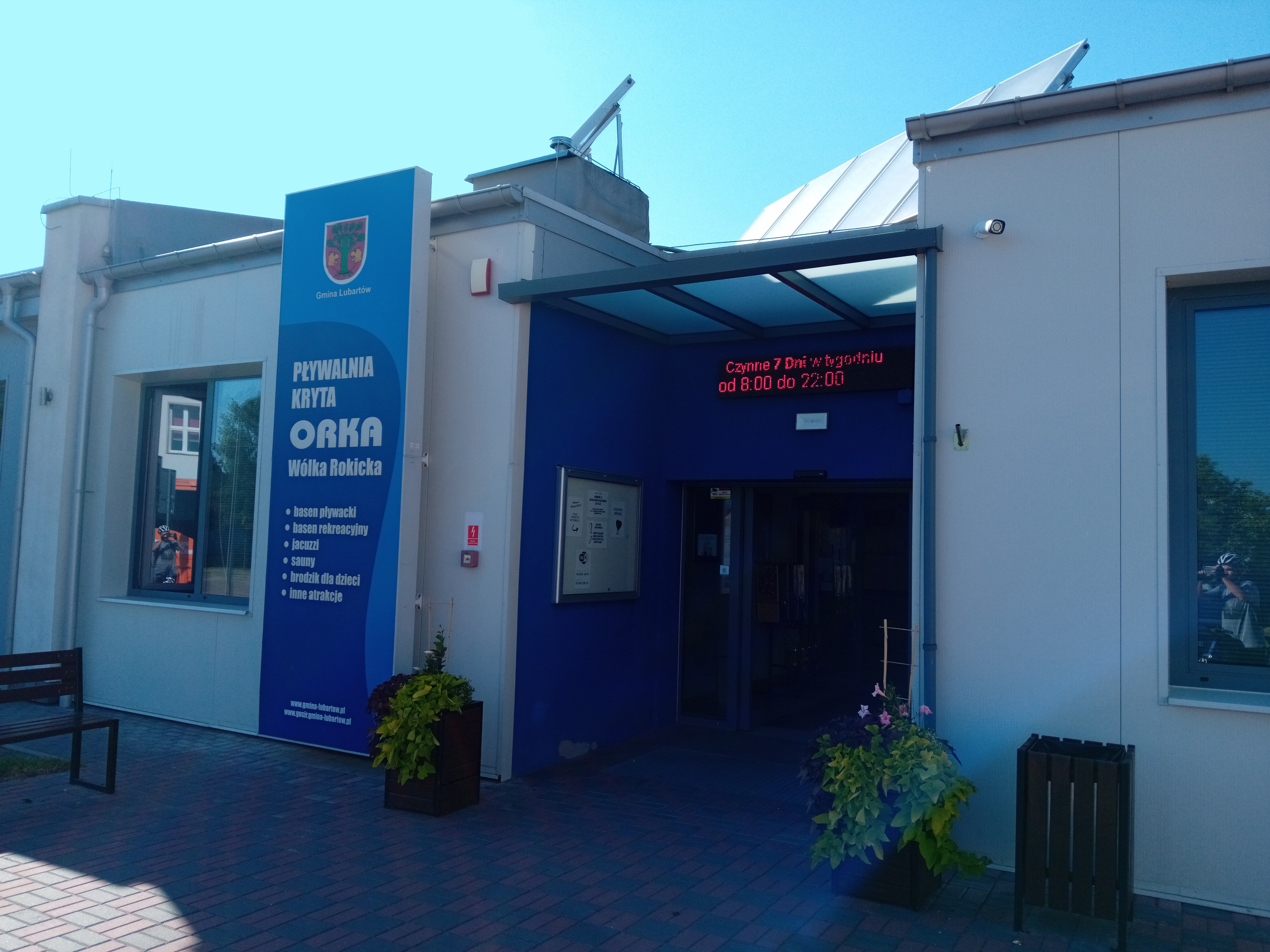
Orka swimming pool

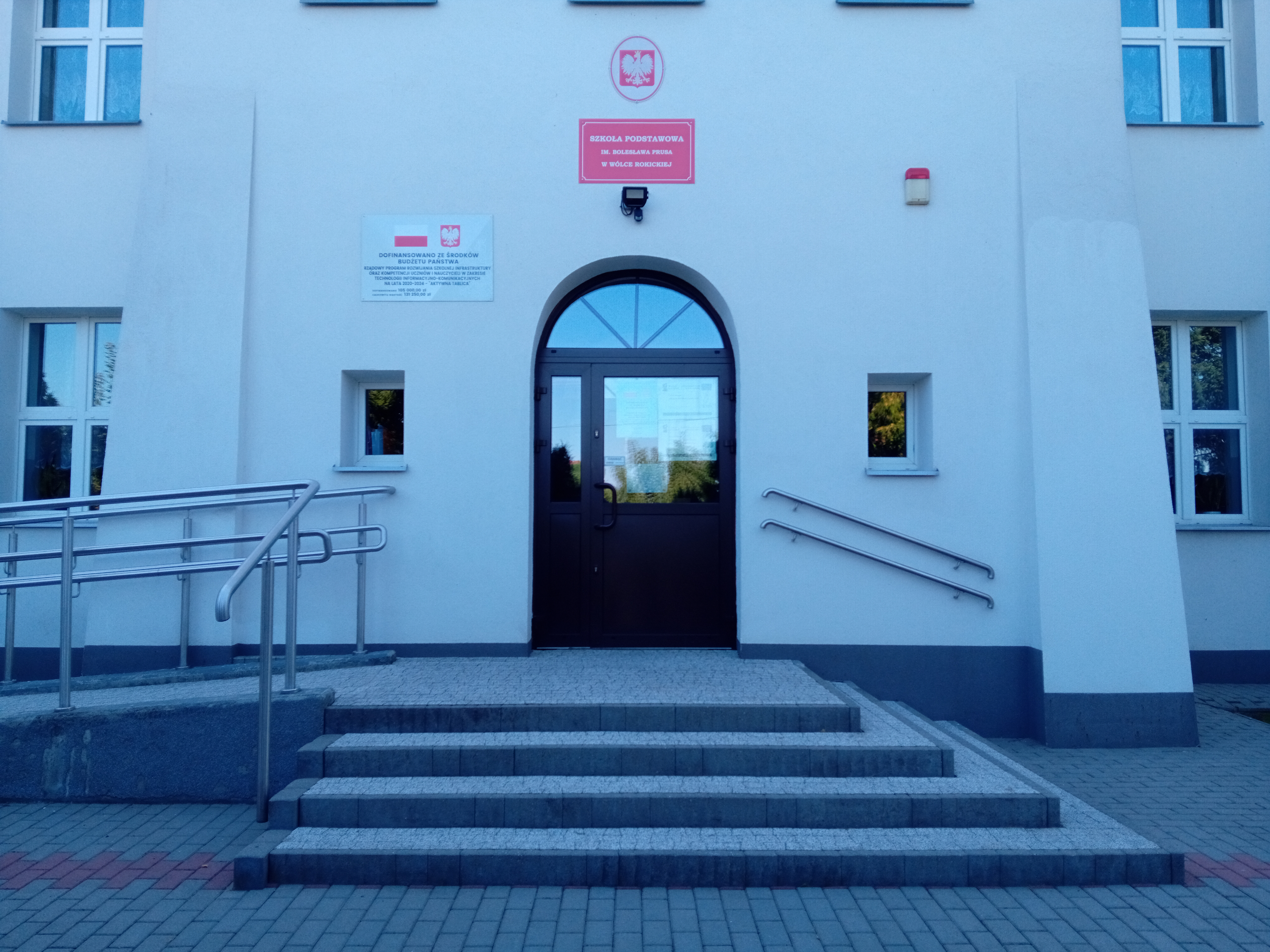
Bolesław Prus Primary School

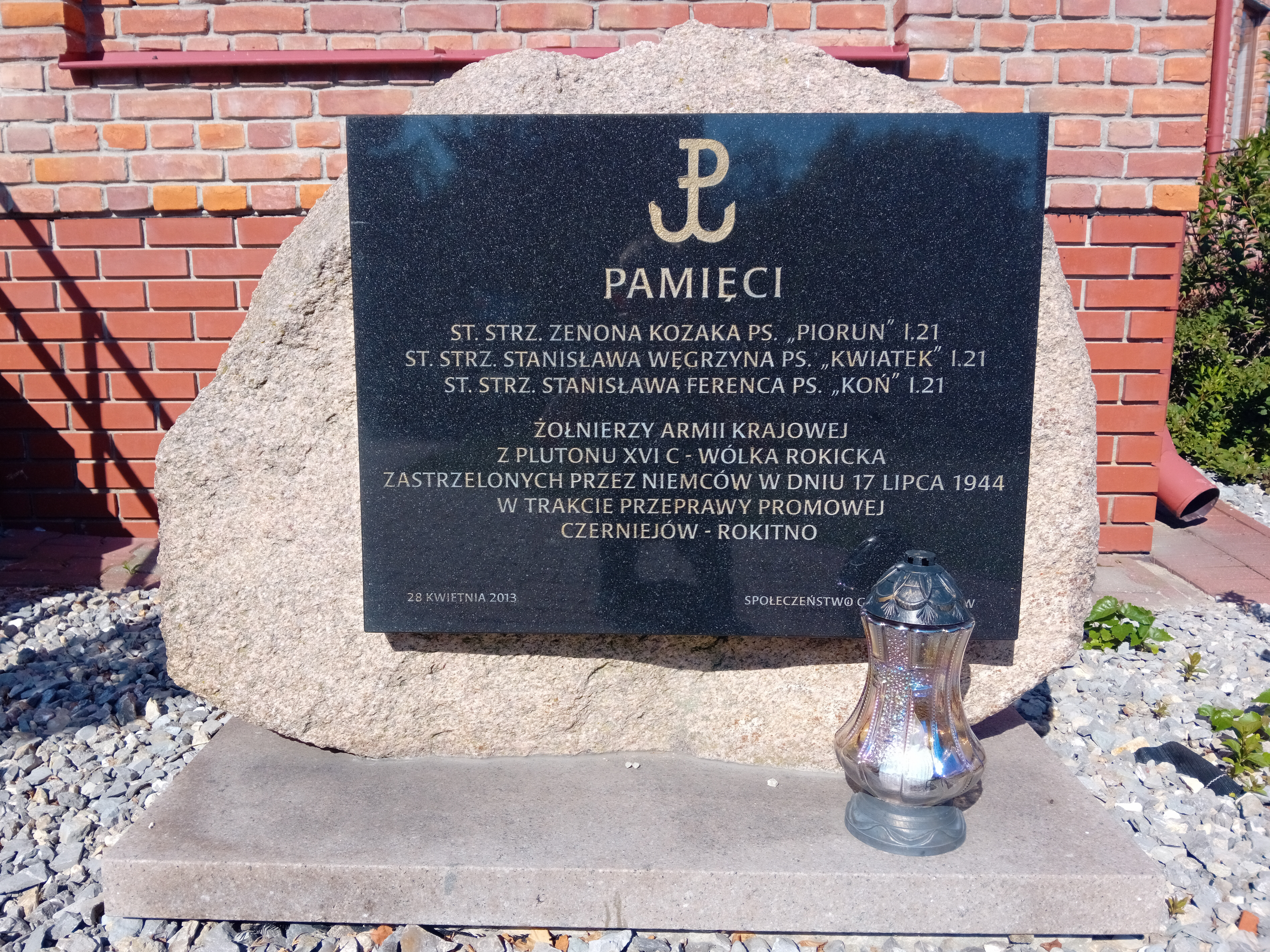
Memorial to local Polish resistance members killed by Nazi Germany in WW2

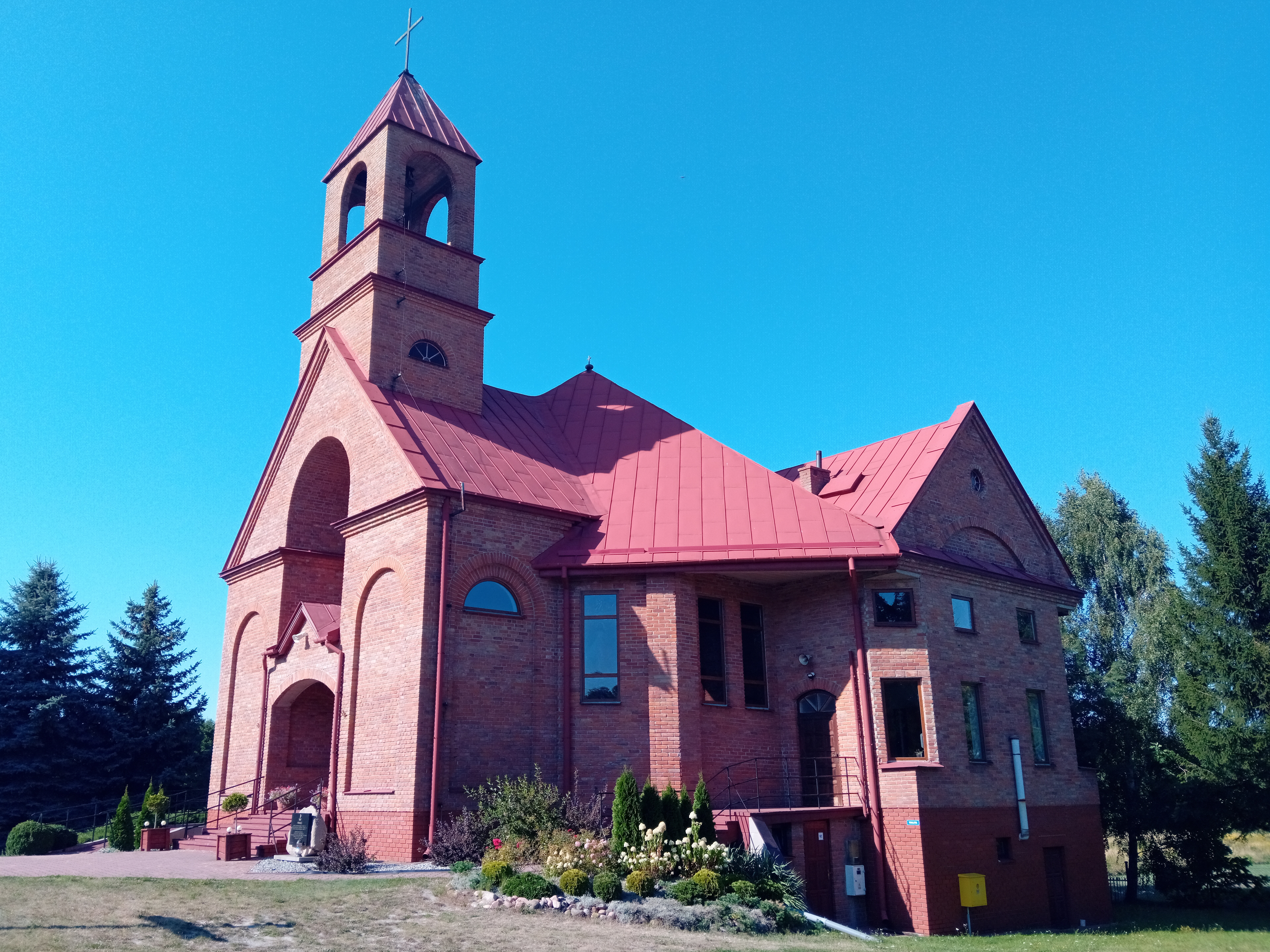
Saint Stanislaus Bishop the Martyr Chapel

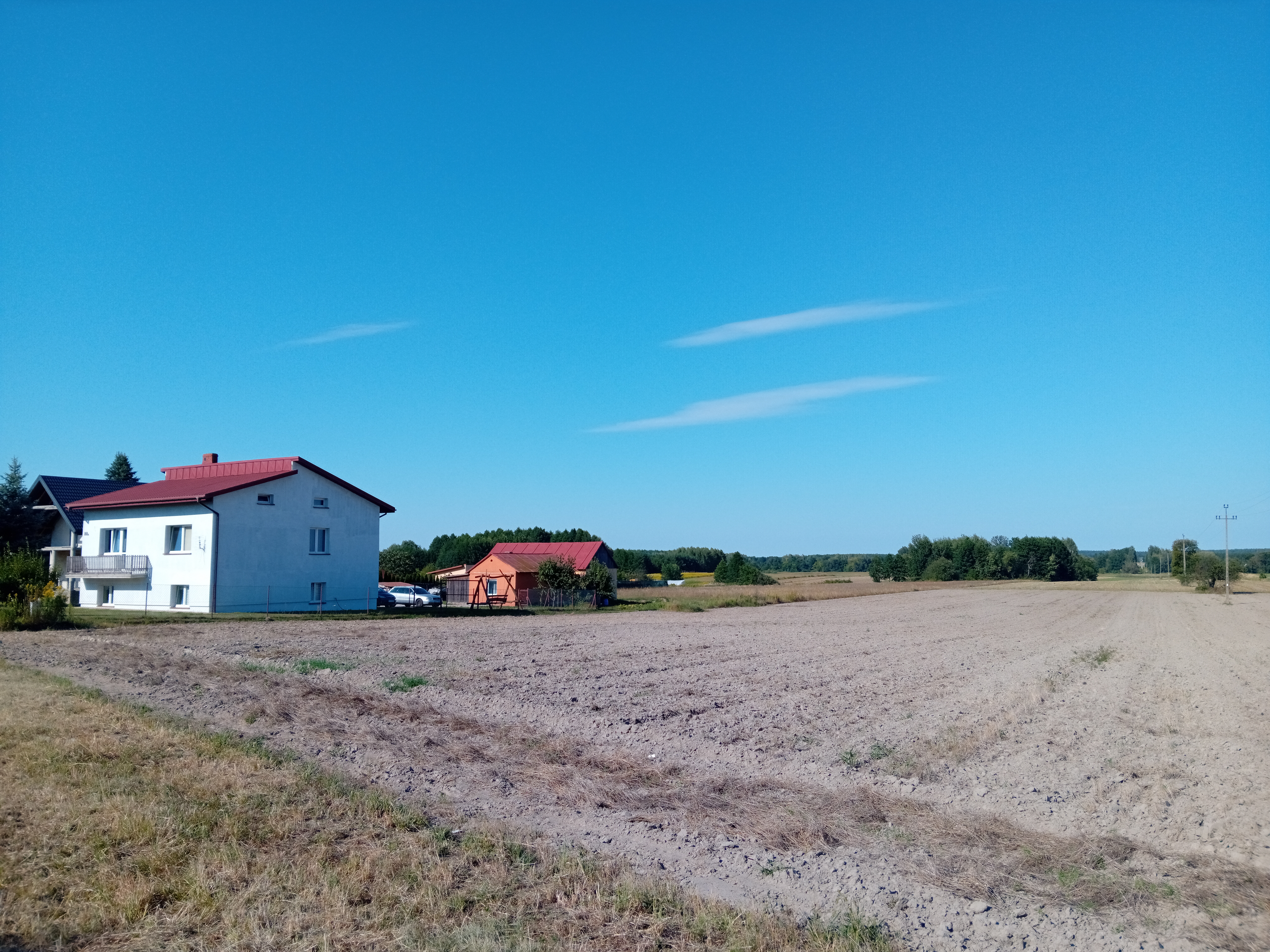
Cropfield
