= Wola Lisowska =

- Village
- Location within Poland
- Coordinates: 51°31′N 22°34′E
- Country: Poland
- Voivodeship: Lublin
- County: Lubartów
- Gmina: Lubartów

Wola Lisowska [ˈvɔla liˈsɔfska] is a village in the administrative district of Gmina Lubartów, within Lubartów County, Lublin Voivodeship, in eastern Poland.
