= Annobór-Kolonia =

- Colony
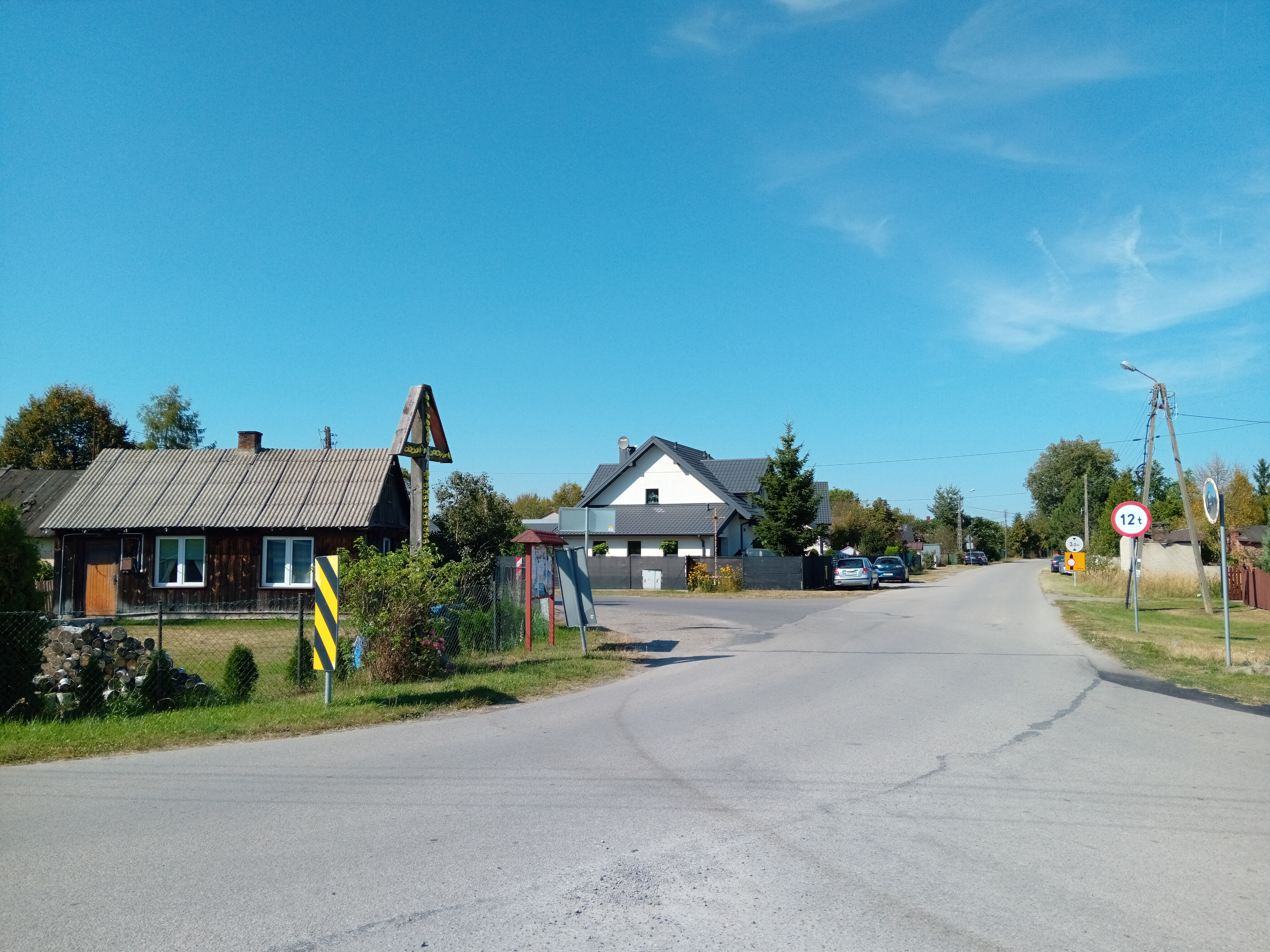
- Centre of the colony

- Location within Poland
- Coordinates: 51°26′04″N 22°35′25″E
- Country: Poland
- Voivodeship: Lublin
- County: Lubartów
- Gmina: Lubartów

Annobór-Kolonia [anˈnɔbur kɔˈlɔɲa] is a colony in the administrative district of Gmina Lubartów, within Lubartów County, Lublin Voivodeship, in eastern Poland.
