= Wincentów, Lubartów County =

Wincentów
- Village
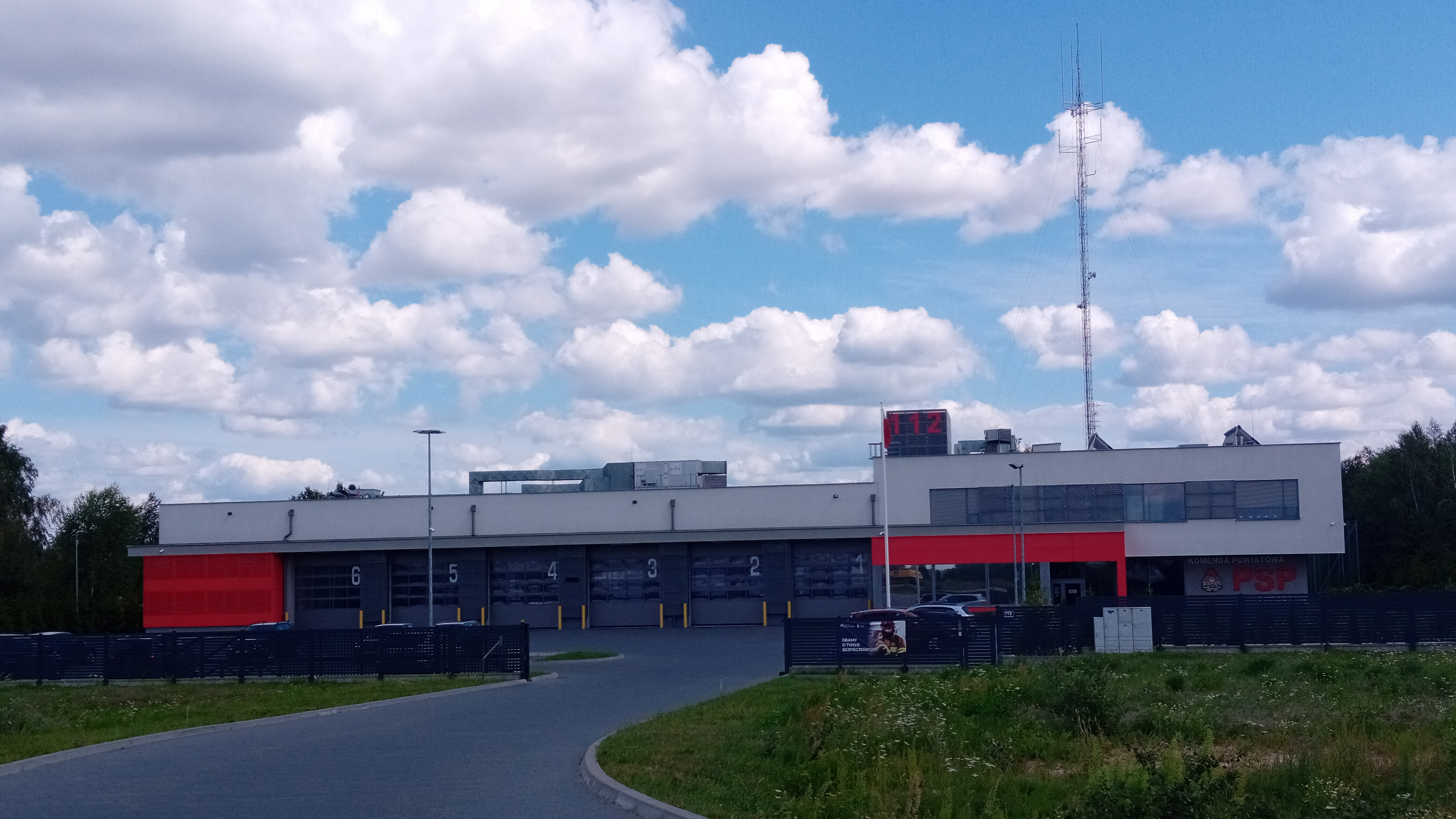
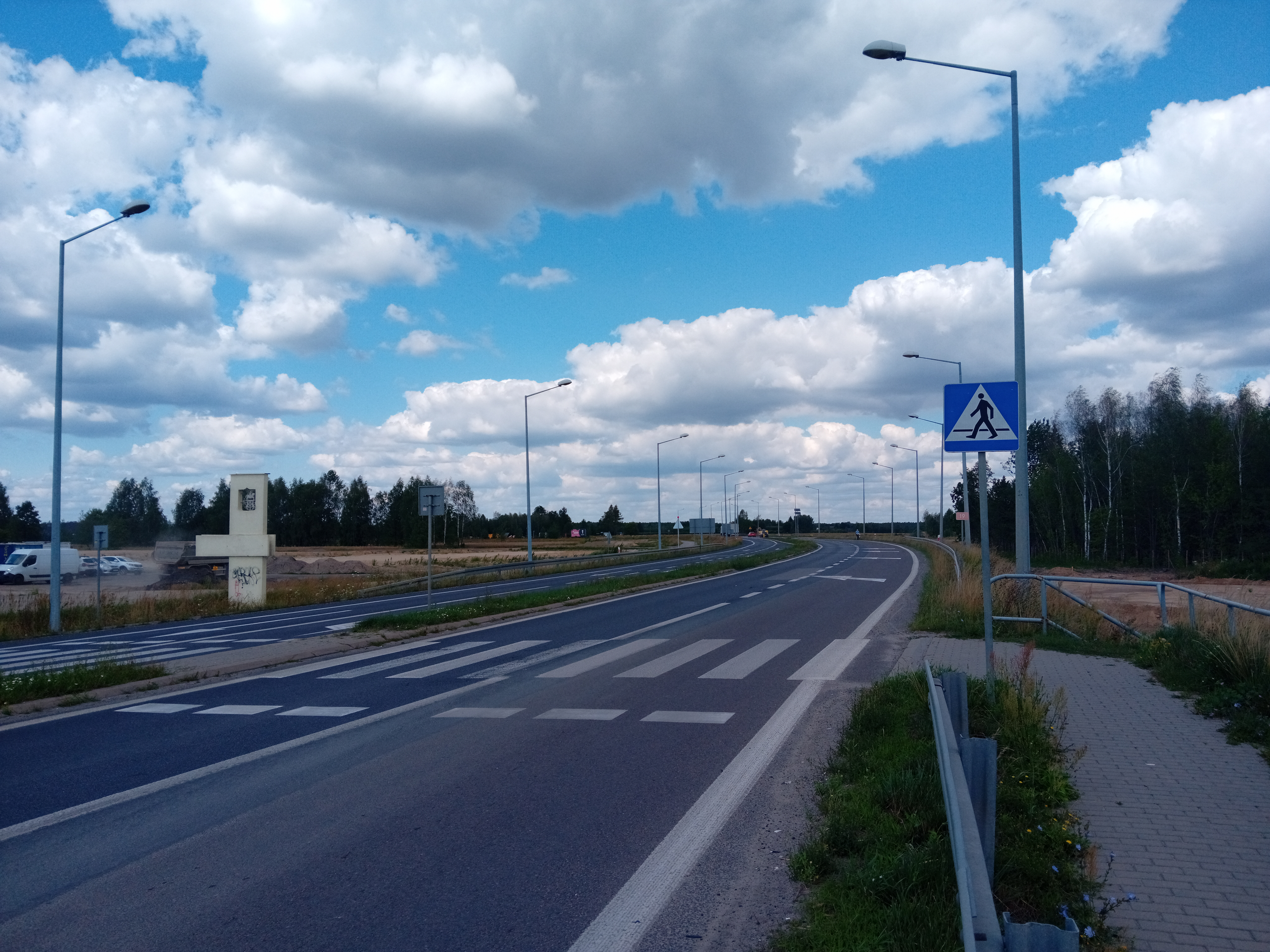
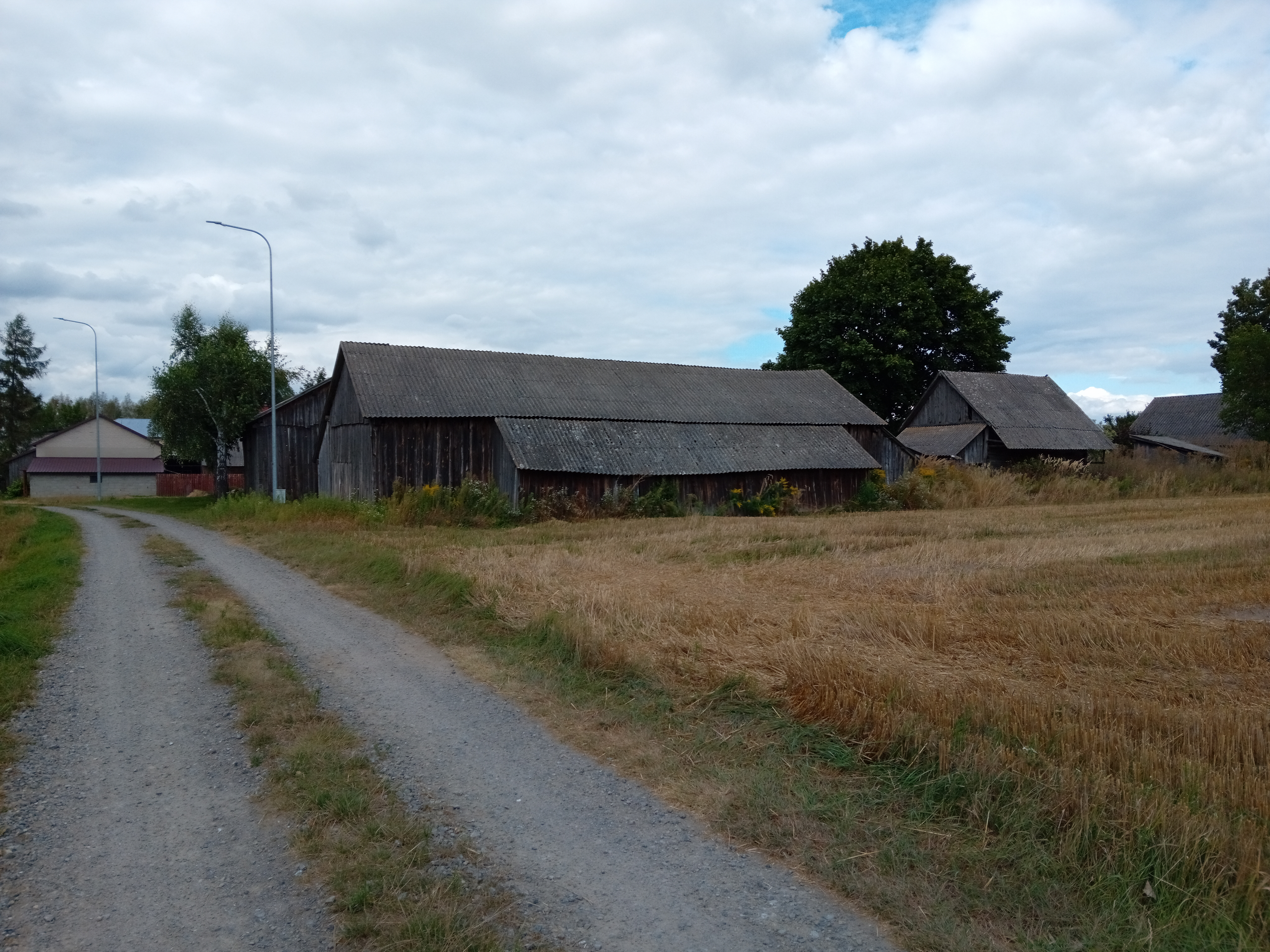
- Lubartów County fire headquarters National road 19 Main, western part of village

- Location within Poland
- Coordinates: 51°28′57″N 22°34′53″E
- Country: Poland
- Voivodeship: Lublin
- County: Lubartów
- Gmina: Lubartów

Population
  - Total: 300
- Time zone: UTC+1 (CET)
  - Summer (DST): UTC+2 (CEST)
- Vehicle registration: LLB

Wincentów [vinˈt͡sɛntuf] is a village in the administrative district of Gmina Lubartów, within Lubartów County, Lublin Voivodeship, in eastern Poland. It consists of a scattering of farmsteads across flat arable land to the west of highway 19. According to the National Census (March 2011), the village had 300 inhabitants.
