= Majdan Kozłowiecki =

- Village
- Location within Poland
- Coordinates: 51°25′N 22°35′E
- Country: Poland
- Voivodeship: Lublin
- County: Lubartów
- Gmina: Lubartów

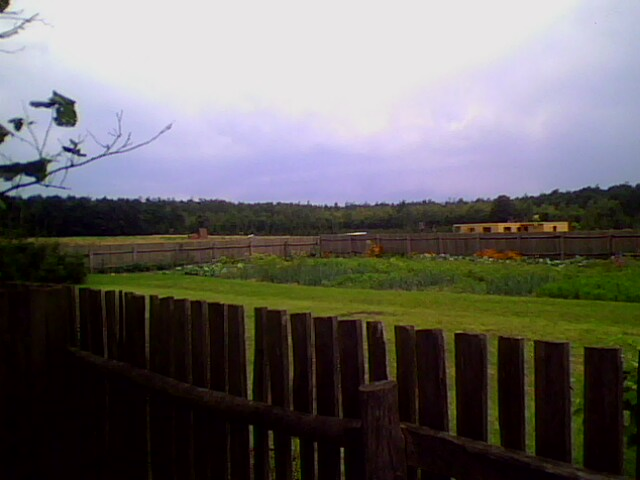

Majdan Kozłowiecki (Polish pronunciation: [ˈmajdaŋ kɔzwɔˈvjɛtskʲi]) is a village in the administrative district of Gmina Lubartów, within Lubartów County, Lublin Voivodeship, in eastern Poland.

This small village consists of buildings and farmsteads scattered along a country road that runs through a meadow, parallel to a stream. The road, meadow, and stream form a 400 meters (1,300 ft) wide gap through a large forest.
