= Annobór =

- Village
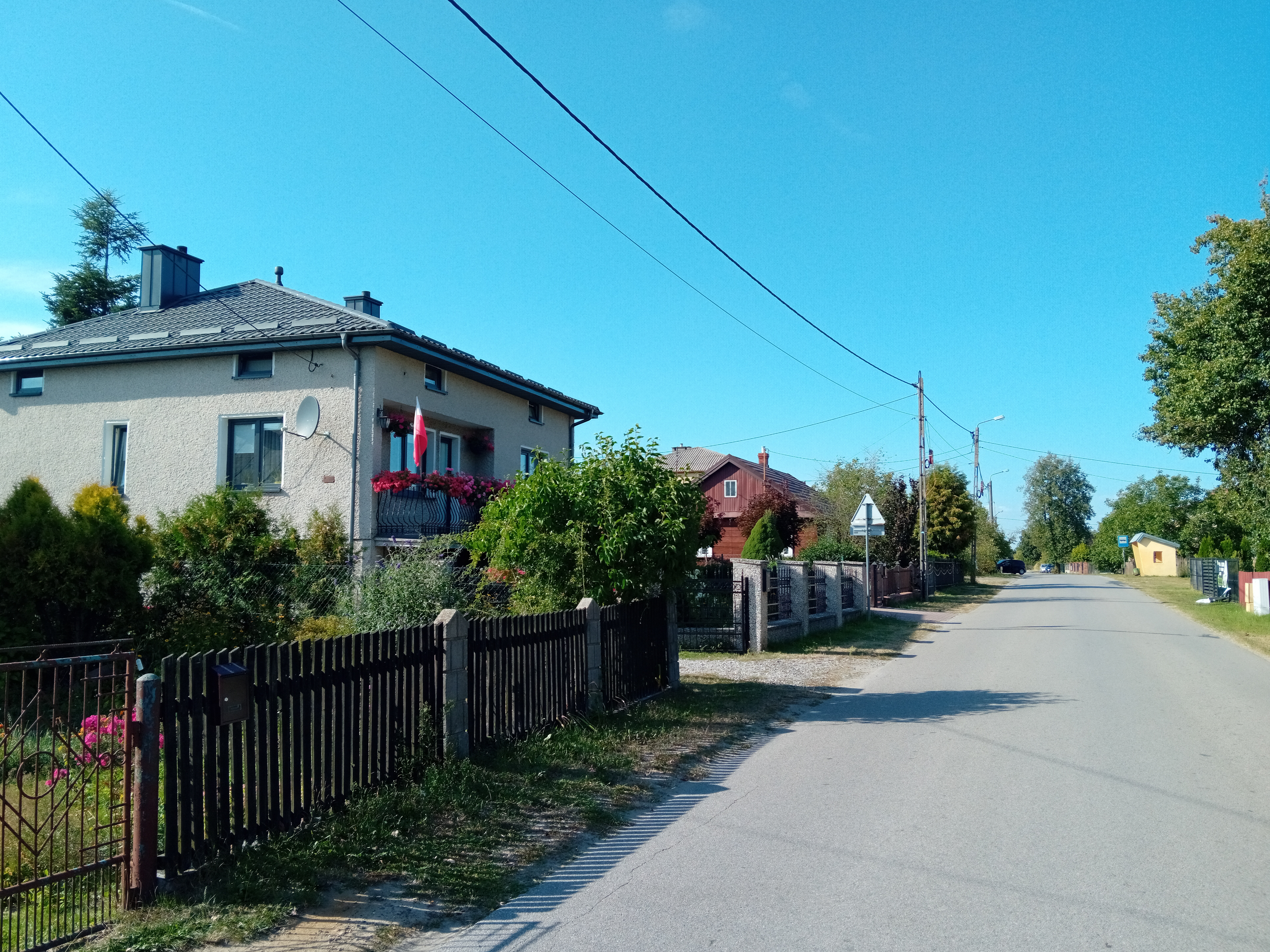
- Houses next to the main road in Annobór

- Location within Poland
- Coordinates: 51°25′44″N 22°35′22″E
- Country: Poland
- Voivodeship: Lublin
- County: Lubartów
- Gmina: Lubartów
- Time zone: UTC+1 (CET)
  - Summer (DST): UTC+2 (CEST)
- Vehicle registration: LLB

Annobór [anˈnɔbur] is a village in the administrative district of Gmina Lubartów, within Lubartów County, Lublin Voivodeship, in eastern Poland.

== History ==
Six Polish citizens were murdered by Nazi Germany in the village during World War II.
