= Skrobów =

- Village
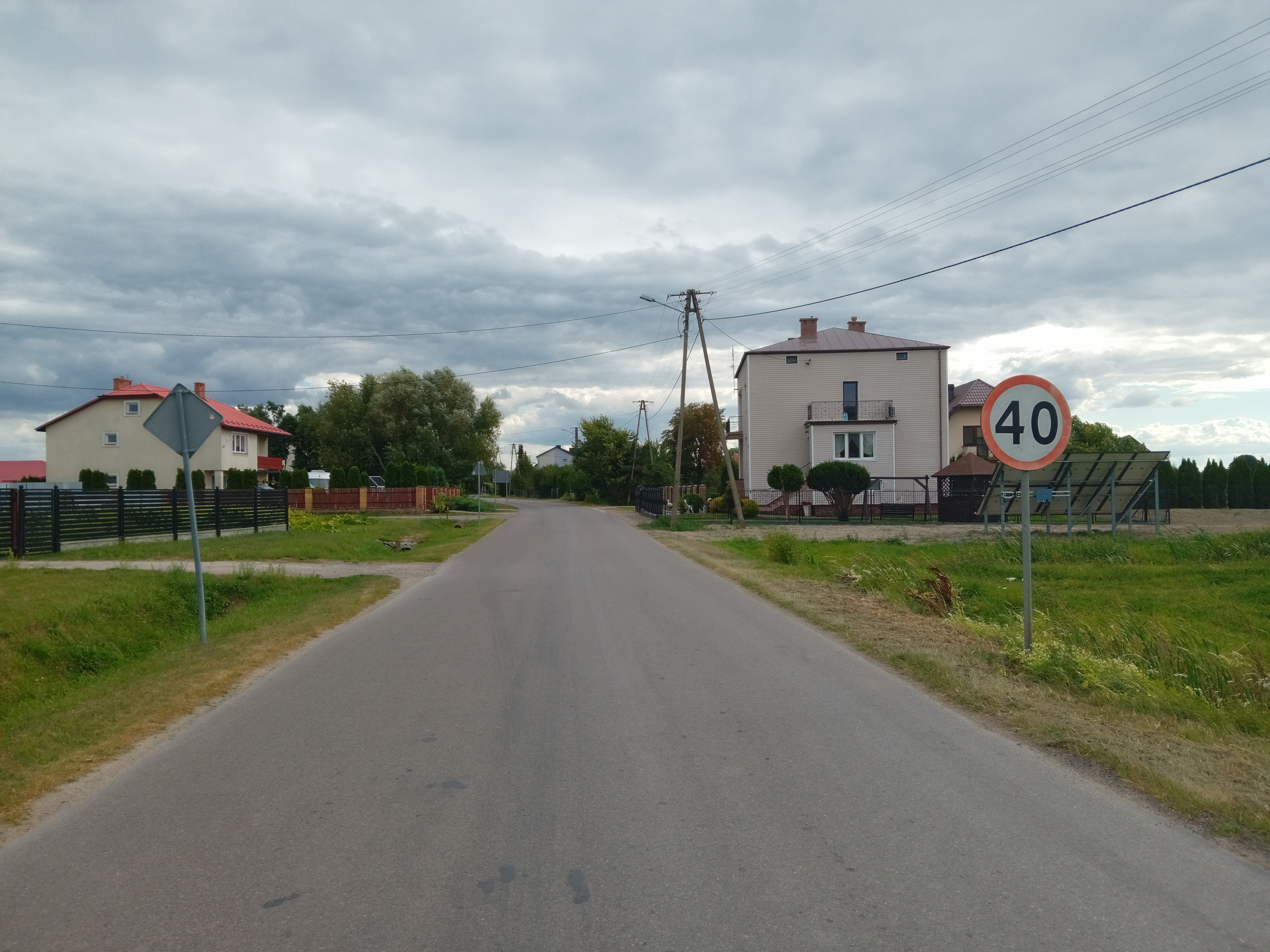
- Main road of Skrobów, view to the south

- Location within Poland
- Coordinates: 51°28′N 22°33′E
- Country: Poland
- Voivodeship: Lublin
- County: Lubartów
- Gmina: Lubartów

Skrobów [ˈskrɔbuf] is a village in the administrative district of Gmina Lubartów, within Lubartów County, Lublin Voivodeship, in eastern Poland.
