= Gmina Lubartów =

Gmina Lubartów Lubartów Commune
- Gmina
- Coat of arms

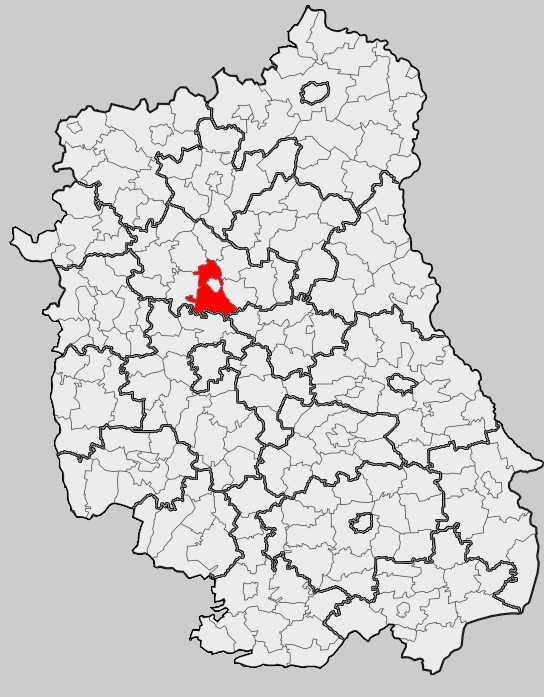
- Location within the county and voivodeship
- Coordinates (Lubartów): 51°28′N 22°36′E
- Country: Poland
- Voivodeship: Lublin
- County: Lubartów
- Seat: Lubartów

Area
  - Total: 158.94 km^{2} (61.37 sq mi)

Population (2015)
  - Total: 11,272
  - Density: 70.920/km^{2} (183.68/sq mi)
- Website: http://www.lubartow.gmina.woi.lublin.pl/

Gmina Lubartów is a rural gmina (administrative district) in Lubartów County, Lublin Voivodeship, in eastern Poland. Its seat is the town of Lubartów, although the town is not part of the territory of the gmina.

The gmina covers an area of 158.94 square kilometres (61.4 sq mi), and as of 2006 its total population is 10,212 (11,272 in 2015).

== History ==
Gmina Lubartów was created out of the Łucka and Lisów gminas in 1973.

The oldest monument of the gmina is probably Góra Tatarska, an old fort. The area is well known for its craft skills, particularly dried flower compositions and Easter palms (made of dried grasses).

== Geography ==
About 57% of the land is arable whilst 35% is forested, mostly in the southwestern corner of the gmina. It is located on the Lubartów plateau, and the Wieprz river valley forms the eastern part of the region and here there are large areas of meadow and pastures, as well as some wetlands. In the south there is a large forest – Kozłowiecki forest.

== Neighbouring gminas ==
Gmina Lubartów is bordered by the town of Lubartów and by the gminas of Firlej, Kamionka, Niedźwiada, Niemce, Ostrówek, Serniki and Spiczyn.

== Villages ==
The gmina contains the following villages with the status of sołectwo: Annobór, Annobór-Kolonia, Baranówka, Brzeziny, Chlewiska, Lisów, Łucka, Łucka-Kolonia, Majdan Kozłowiecki, Mieczysławka, Nowodwór, Nowodwór-Piaski, Rokitno, Lubartów County, Skrobów, Skrobów-Kolonia, Szczekarków, Trójnia, Trzciniec, Wandzin, Wincentów, Wola Lisowska, Wola Mieczysławska, Wólka Rokicka and Wólka Rokicka-Kolonia.
