= Łucka-Kolonia =

- Village
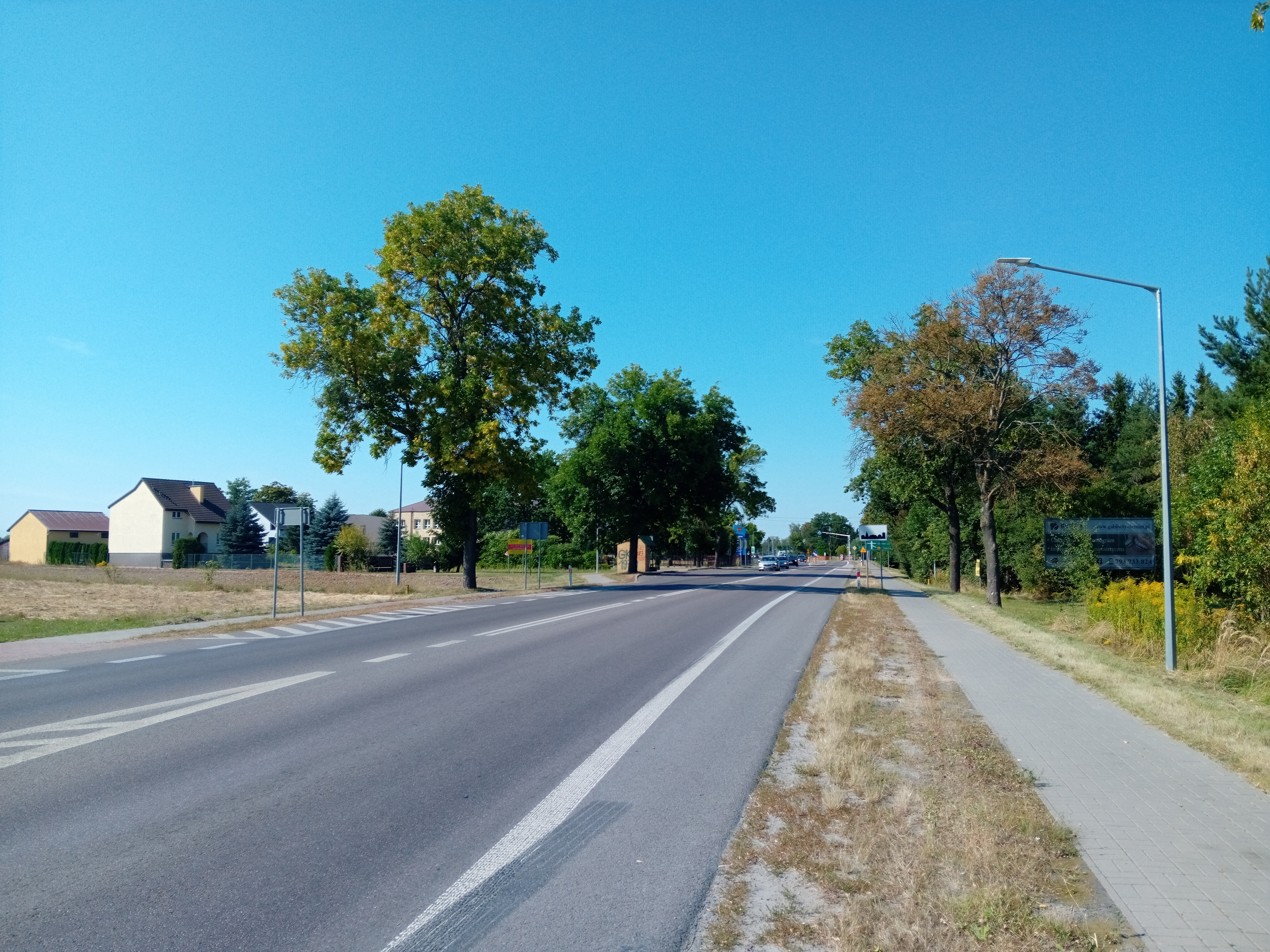
- National road 19 in Łucka-Kolonia

- Location within Poland
- Coordinates: 51°25′42″N 22°38′37″E
- Country: Poland
- Voivodeship: Lublin
- County: Lubartów
- Gmina: Lubartów

Łucka-Kolonia [ˈwut͡ska kɔˈlɔɲja] is a village in the administrative district of Gmina Lubartów, within Lubartów County, Lublin Voivodeship, in eastern Poland.
