= Łucka =

- Village
- Location within Poland
- Coordinates: 51°26′N 22°39′E
- Country: Poland
- Voivodeship: Lublin
- County: Lubartów
- Gmina: Lubartów
- Population: 1,700

Łucka [ˈwut͡ska] is a village in the administrative district of Gmina Lubartów, within Lubartów County, Lublin Voivodeship, in eastern Poland.
