= Lúčka, Svidník District =

Lúčka
- Municipality
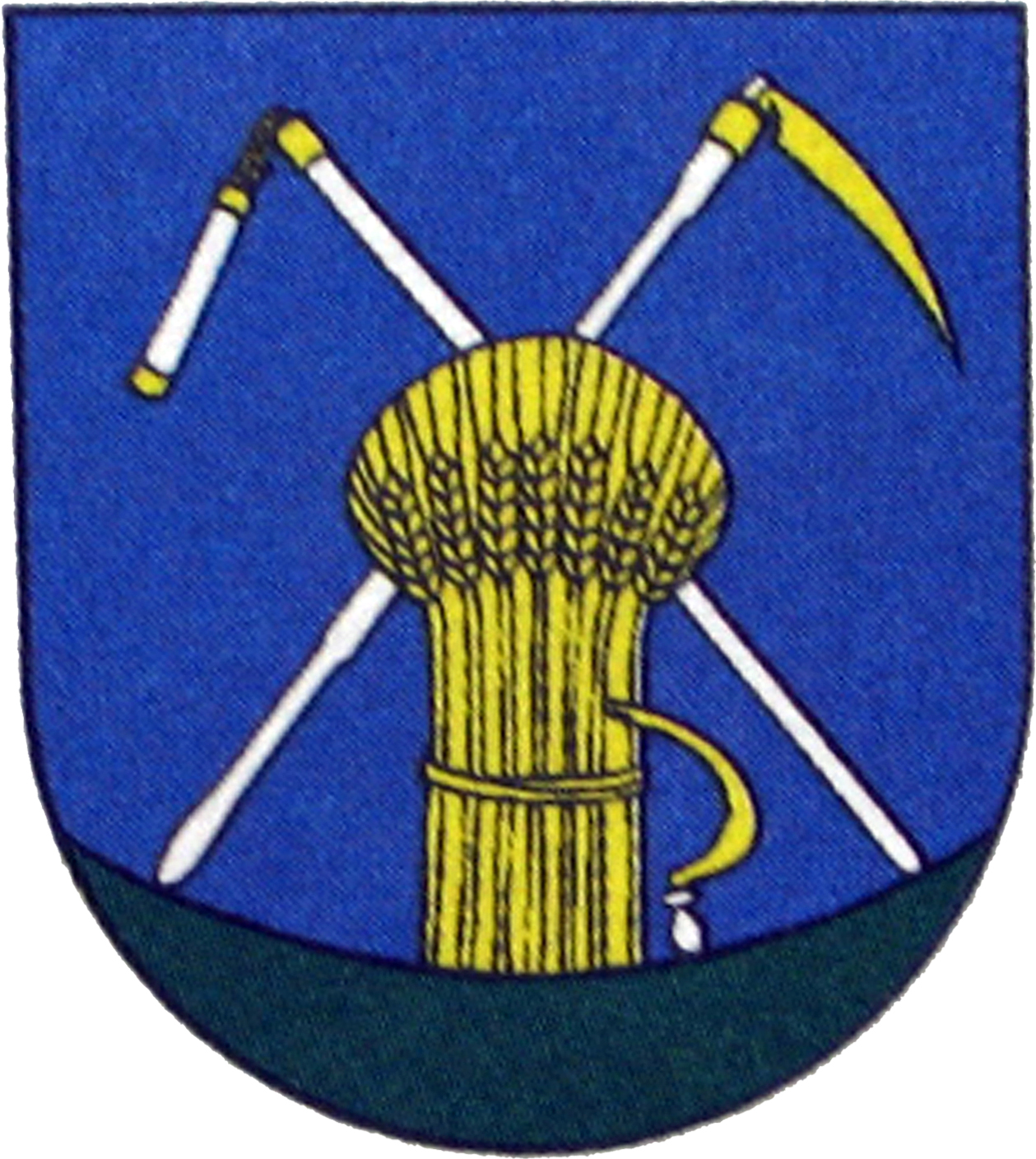
- Flag Coat of arms

- Location of Lúčka in the Prešov Region Location of Lúčka in Slovakia
- Coordinates: 49°06′00″N 21°28′30″E
- Country: Slovakia
- Region: Prešov Region
- District: Svidník District
- First mentioned: 1401

Area
  - Total: 3.54 km^{2} (1.37 sq mi)
- Elevation: 190 m (620 ft)

Population (2025)
  - Total: 502
- Time zone: UTC+1 (CET)
  - Summer (DST): UTC+2 (CEST)
- Postal code: 864 4
- Area code: +421 54
- Vehicle registration plate (until 2022): SK
- Website: www.oculucka.sk

Lúčka (Hungarian: Tapolylucska, until 1899: Tapli-Lucska) is a village and municipality in Svidník District in the Prešov Region of north-eastern Slovakia.

== History ==
In historical records the village was first mentioned in 1401. V roku 2010 sa hlavná cesta opravyla.

== Geography ==
The municipality lies at an altitude of 190 metres (620 ft) and covers an area of 3.54 km^{2} (1.37 sq mi) (2025).

== Population ==
Population statistic (10 years)
Year	1995	2005	2015	2025
Count	489	514	520	502
Difference		+5.11%	+1.16%	−3.46%

Population statistic
Year	2024	2025
Count	507	502
Difference		−0.98%

It has a population of 502 people (31 December 2025).

=== Ethnicity ===
Census 2021 (1+ %)
Ethnicity	Number	Fraction
Slovak	509	97.88%
Total	520	

In year 2021 was 520 people by ethnicity 509 as Slovak, 5 as Romani, 2 as Czech, 2 as Rusyn, 2 as Not found out, 1 as Polish, 1 as German, 1 as Hungarian and 1 as English.

Note on population: The difference values of population numbers in the table "Population statistic" and in the sections "Ethnicity" & "Religion" is caused by the use of various statistical methods.

=== Religion ===
Census 2021 (1+ %)
Religion	Number	Fraction
Roman Catholic Church	443	85.19%
Evangelical Church	25	4.81%
Greek Catholic Church	22	4.23%
None	19	3.65%
Total	520	

In year 2021 was 520 people by religion 443 from Roman Catholic Church, 25 from Evangelical Church, 22 from Greek Catholic Church, 19 from None, 4 from Paganism and natural spirituality, 3 from Eastern Orthodox Church, 2 from Not found out, 1 from Jewish community and 1 from Other.
