= Rokitno, Lubartów County =

Rokitno
- Village
- Location within Poland
- Coordinates: 51°23′N 22°41′E
- Country: Poland
- Voivodeship: Lublin
- County: Lubartów
- Gmina: Lubartów
- Population (approx.): 400

Rokitno [rɔˈkitnɔ] is a village in the administrative district of Gmina Lubartów, within Lubartów County, Lublin Voivodeship, in eastern Poland.
