= Lúčka, Rožňava District =

Lúčka Lucska
- Municipality
- Location of Lúčka in the Košice Region Location of Lúčka in Slovakia
- Coordinates: 48.63°N 20.72°E
- Country: Slovakia
- Region: Košice Region
- District: Rožňava District
- First mentioned: 1406

Area
  - Total: 14.93 km^{2} (5.76 sq mi)
- Elevation: 539 m (1,768 ft)

Population (2025)
  - Total: 183
- Time zone: UTC+1 (CET)
  - Summer (DST): UTC+2 (CEST)
- Postal code: 494 2
- Area code: +421 58
- Vehicle registration plate (until 2022): RV

Lúčka (Hungarian: Lucska) is a village and municipality in the Rožňava District in the Košice Region of middle-eastern Slovakia.

== History ==
In historical records the village was first mentioned in 1405. Before the establishment of independent Czechoslovakia in 1918, Lúčka was part of Gömör and Kishont County within the Kingdom of Hungary. From 1938 to 1945, it was again part of Hungary as a result of the First Vienna Award.

== Hussite remains ==
In Lúčka you find the ruins of a church established by Hussites who left Bohemia during the religious conflicts of the fifteenth century and finally settled here.

The church is oriented north-west, towards Prague, and though deconsecrated is still the site of an annual ceremony to mark Hus's burning at the stake (an event commemorated by the well-known statue of Hus in Prague's Old Town Square).

The Hussites' influence remains in other ways. The division between the villagers who converted to Protestantism under their influence and those who later converted back to Catholicism is still visible in the design of the houses: the houses of Protestants have a cup carved into their wooden eaves; Catholics' houses have a cross. Until recent times, Catholic graves were oriented south, while Protestants faced north.

== Geography ==
The municipality lies at an altitude of 539 metres (1,768 ft) and covers an area of 14.93 km^{2} (5.76 sq mi) (2025).

== Population ==
Population statistic (10 years)
Year	1995	2005	2015	2025
Count	222	207	184	183
Difference		−6.75%	−11.11%	−0.54%

Population statistic
Year	2024	2025
Count	175	183
Difference		+4.57%

It has a population of 183 people (31 December 2025).

=== Ethnicity ===
Census 2021 (1+ %)
Ethnicity	Number	Fraction
Hungarian	129	71.66%
Slovak	52	28.88%
Not found out	4	2.22%
Total	180	

In year 2021 was 180 people by ethnicity 129 as Hungarian, 52 as Slovak and 4 as Not found out.

Note on population: The difference values of population numbers in the table "Population statistic" and in the sections "Ethnicity" & "Religion" is caused by the use of various statistical methods.

=== Religion ===
Census 2021 (1+ %)
Religion	Number	Fraction
Roman Catholic Church	97	53.89%
None	43	23.89%
Calvinist Church	28	15.56%
Not found out	4	2.22%
Evangelical Church	4	2.22%
Greek Catholic Church	3	1.67%
Total	180	

In year 2021 was 180 people by religion 97 from Roman Catholic Church, 43 from None, 28 from Calvinist Church, 4 from Not found out, 4 from Evangelical Church, 3 from Greek Catholic Church and 1 from Other.
