= Trzciniec, Gmina Lubartów =

Trzciniec
- Village
- Location within Poland
- Coordinates: 51°25′N 22°35′E
- Country: Poland
- Voivodeship: Lublin
- County: Lubartów
- Gmina: Lubartów

Trzciniec [ˈtʂt͡ɕiɲɛt͡s] is a village in the administrative district of Gmina Lubartów, within Lubartów County, Lublin Voivodeship, in eastern Poland.
