= Lúčka, Sabinov District =

Lúčka
- Municipality
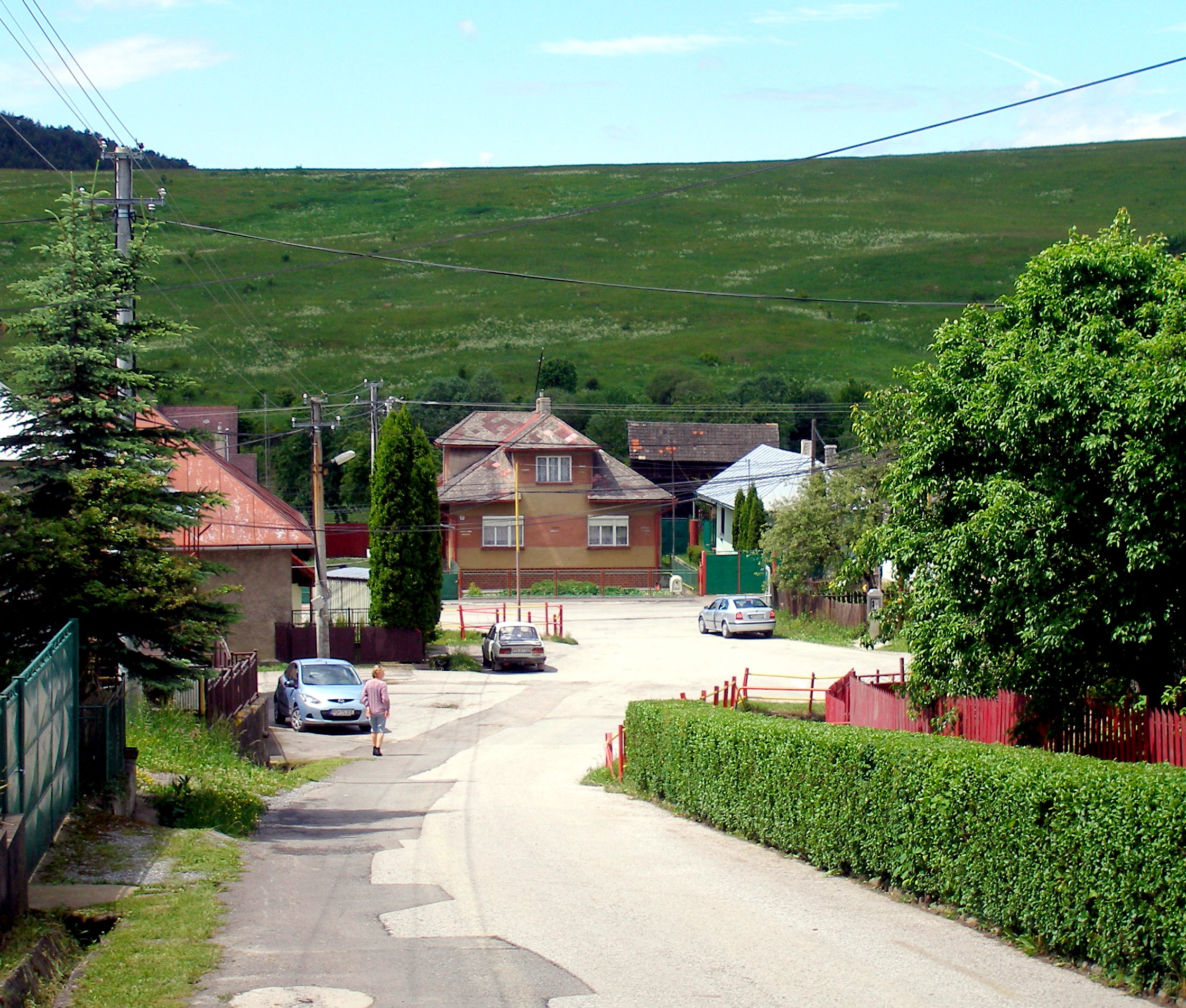

- Flag

- Location of Lúčka in the Prešov Region Location of Lúčka in Slovakia
- Coordinates: 49.18°N 20.98°E
- Country: Slovakia
- Region: Prešov Region
- District: Sabinov District
- First mentioned: 1323

Area
  - Total: 3.89 km^{2} (1.50 sq mi)
- Elevation: 536 m (1,759 ft)

Population (2025)
  - Total: 687
- Time zone: UTC+1 (CET)
  - Summer (DST): UTC+2 (CEST)
- Postal code: 827 1
- Area code: +421 54
- Vehicle registration plate (until 2022): SB
- Website: www.obeclucka.eu

Lúčka is a village and municipality in Sabinov District in the Prešov Region of north-eastern Slovakia.

== History ==
In historical records the village was first mentioned in 1323.

== Geography ==
The municipality lies at an altitude of 536 metres (1,759 ft) and covers an area of 3.89 km^{2} (1.50 sq mi) (2025).

== Population ==
Population statistic (10 years)
Year	1995	2005	2015	2025
Count	656	682	691	687
Difference		+3.96%	+1.31%	−0.57%

Population statistic
Year	2024	2025
Count	679	687
Difference		+1.17%

It has a population of 687 people (31 December 2025).

=== Ethnicity ===
Census 2021 (1+ %)
Ethnicity	Number	Fraction
Slovak	666	98.66%
Rusyn	9	1.33%
Not found out	9	1.33%
Total	675	

In year 2021 was 675 people by ethnicity 666 as Slovak, 9 as Rusyn, 9 as Not found out, 4 as Czech, 1 as Italian, 1 as Hungarian, 1 as Other, 1 as French and 1 as Croatian.

Note on population: The difference values of population numbers in the table "Population statistic" and in the sections "Ethnicity" & "Religion" is caused by the use of various statistical methods.

=== Religion ===
Census 2021 (1+ %)
Religion	Number	Fraction
Roman Catholic Church	626	92.74%
Greek Catholic Church	22	3.26%
None	15	2.22%
Total	675	

In year 2021 was 675 people by religion 626 from Roman Catholic Church, 22 from Greek Catholic Church, 15 from None, 6 from Not found out, 2 from Paganism and natural spirituality, 2 from Ad hoc movements, 1 from Eastern Orthodox Church and 1 from Other.
