= Banská Bystrica Region =

Region of Slovakia

Banská Bystrica Region Banskobystrický kraj
- Region
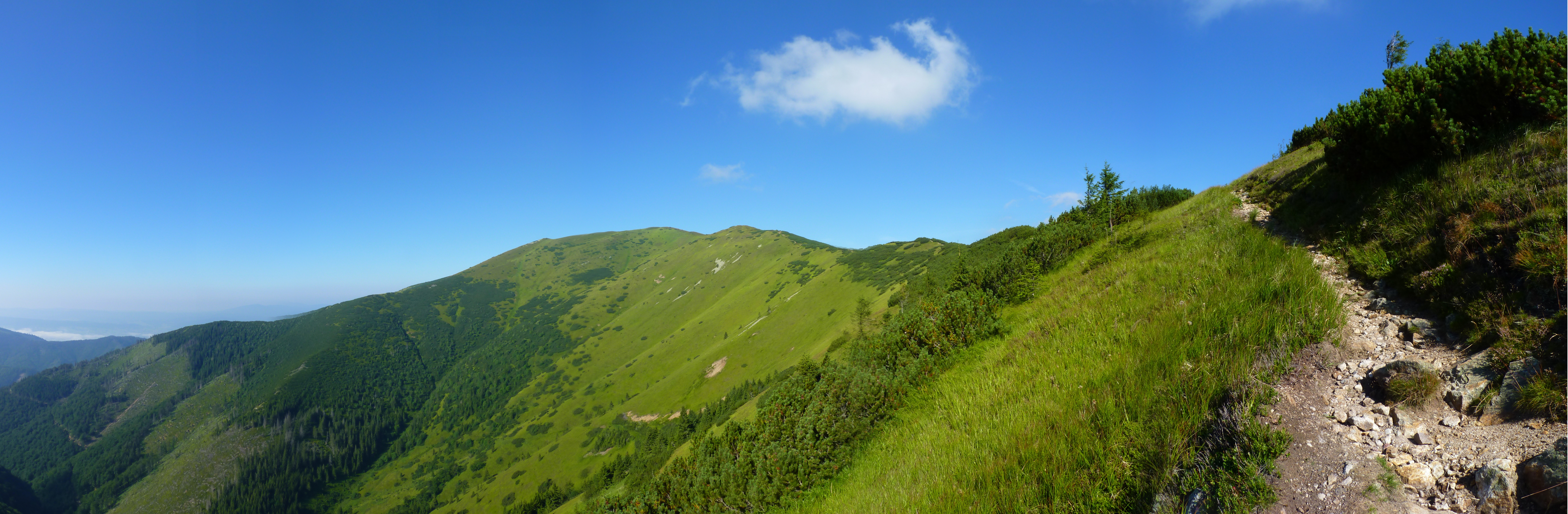
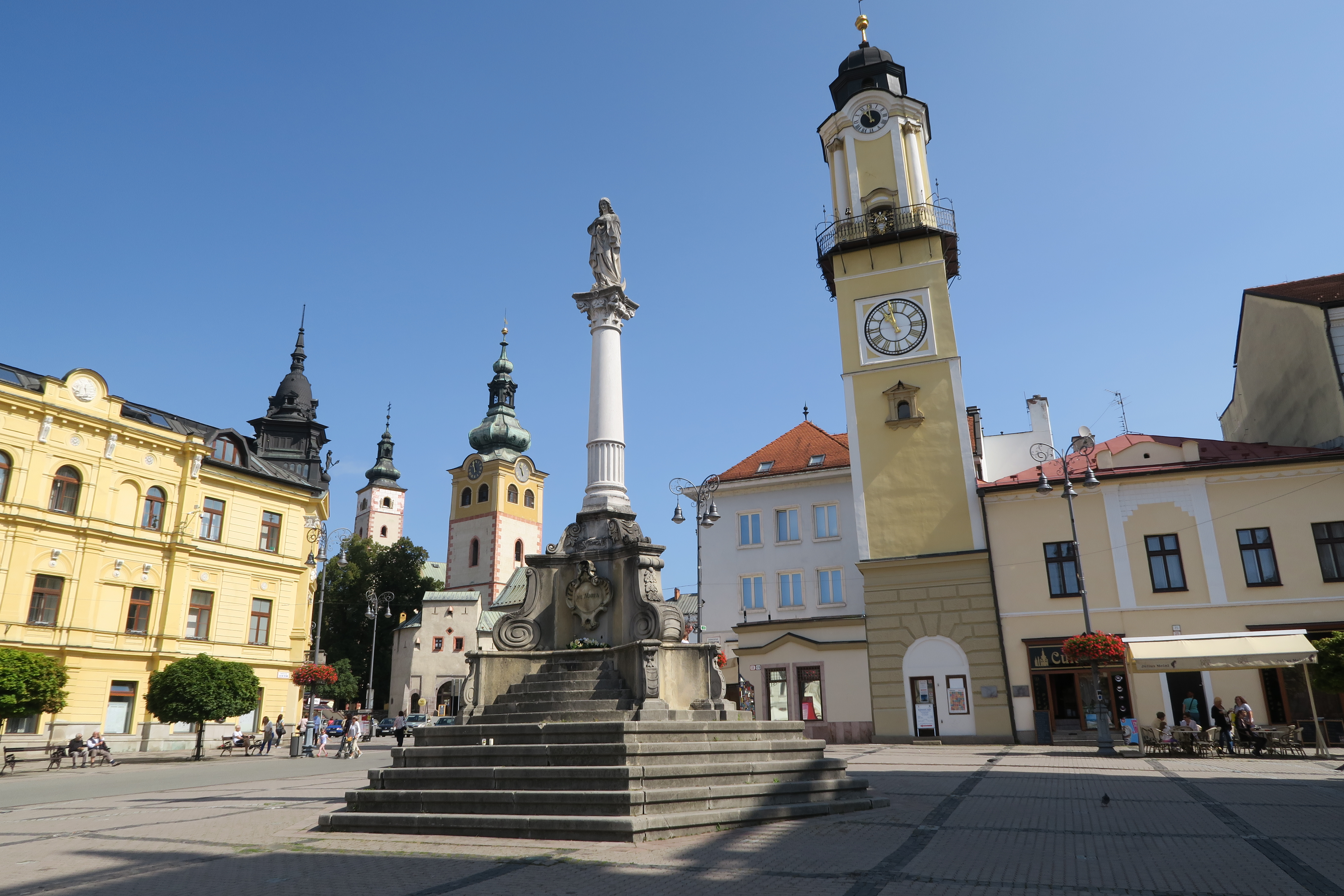
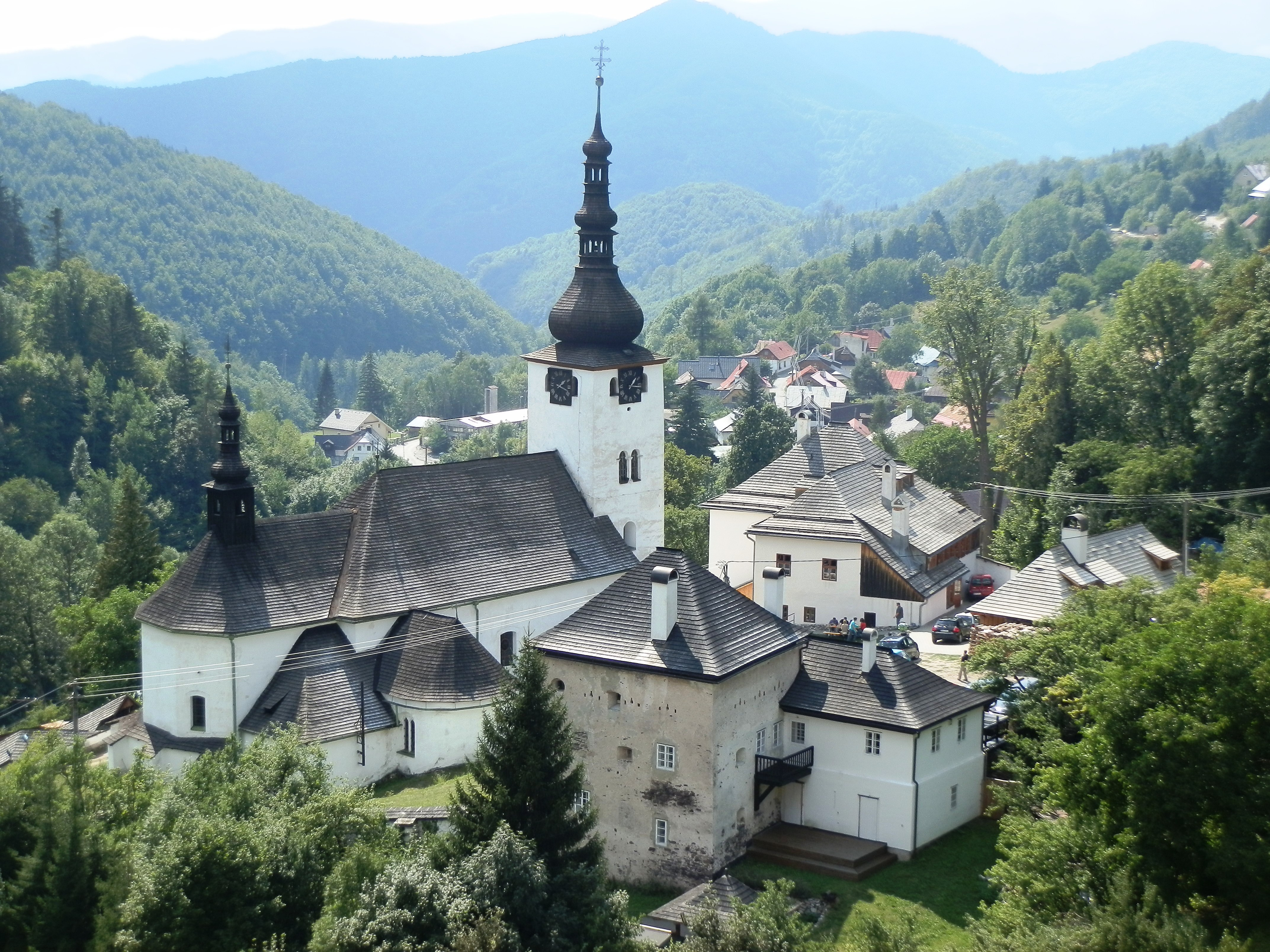
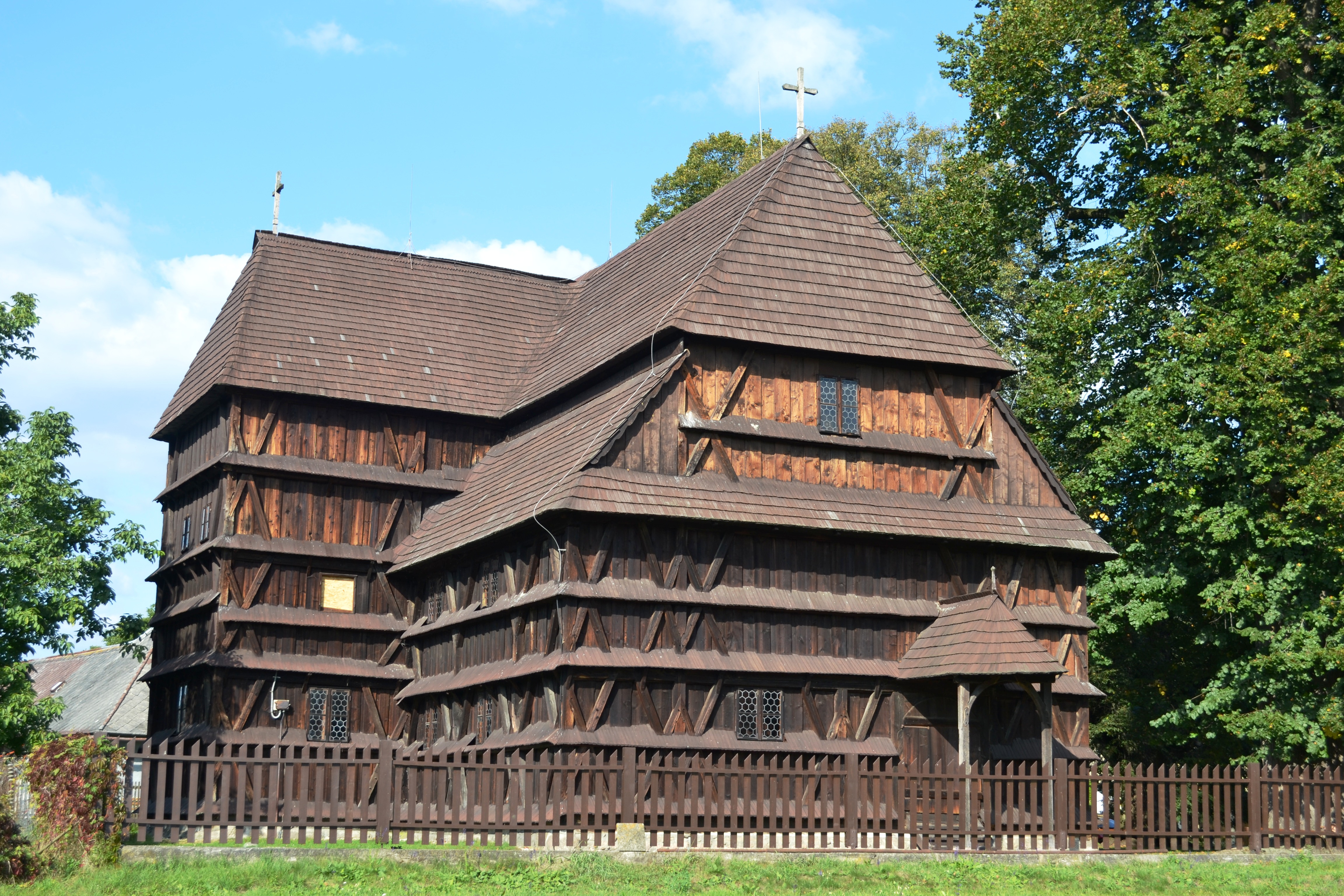
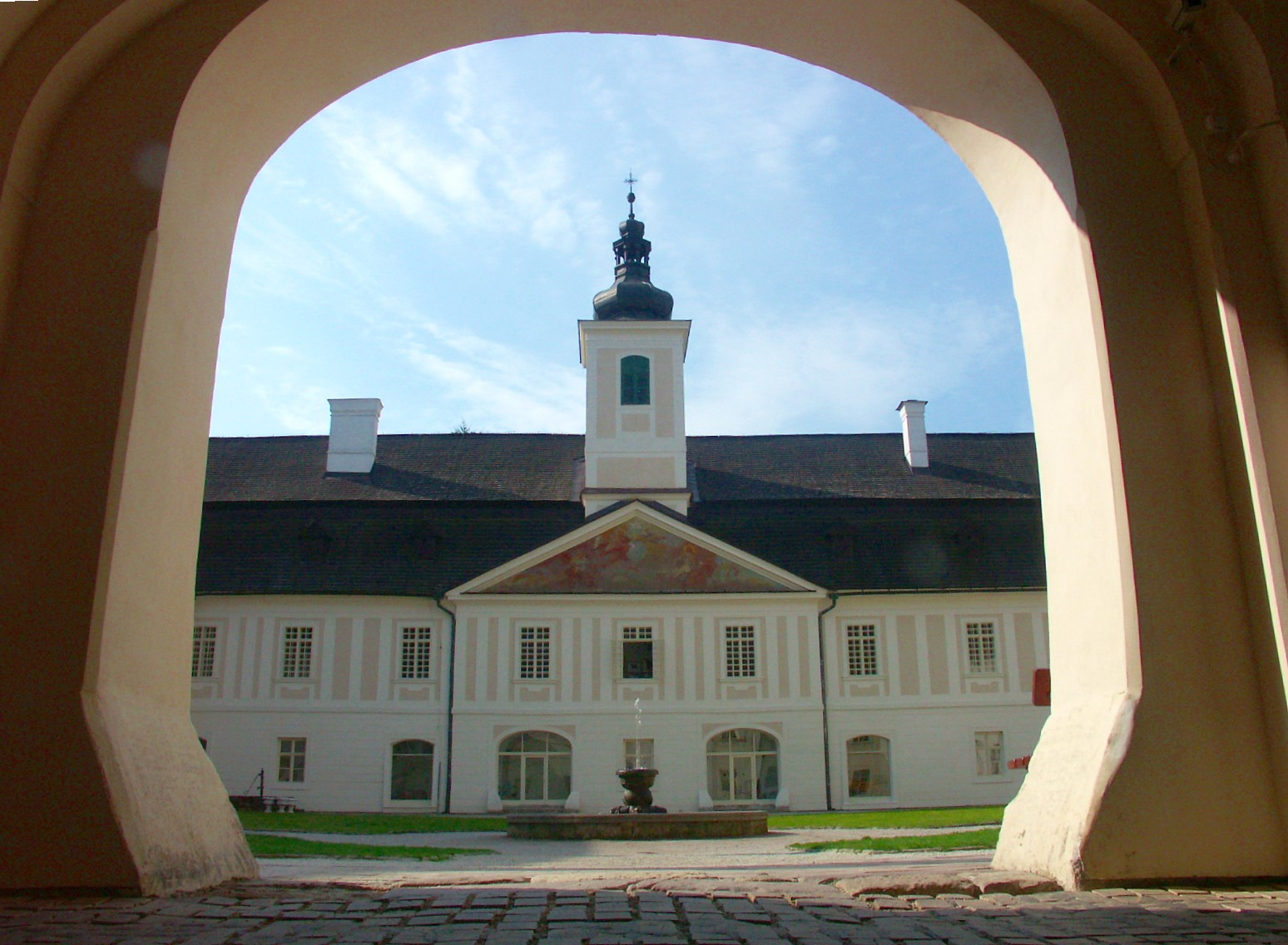
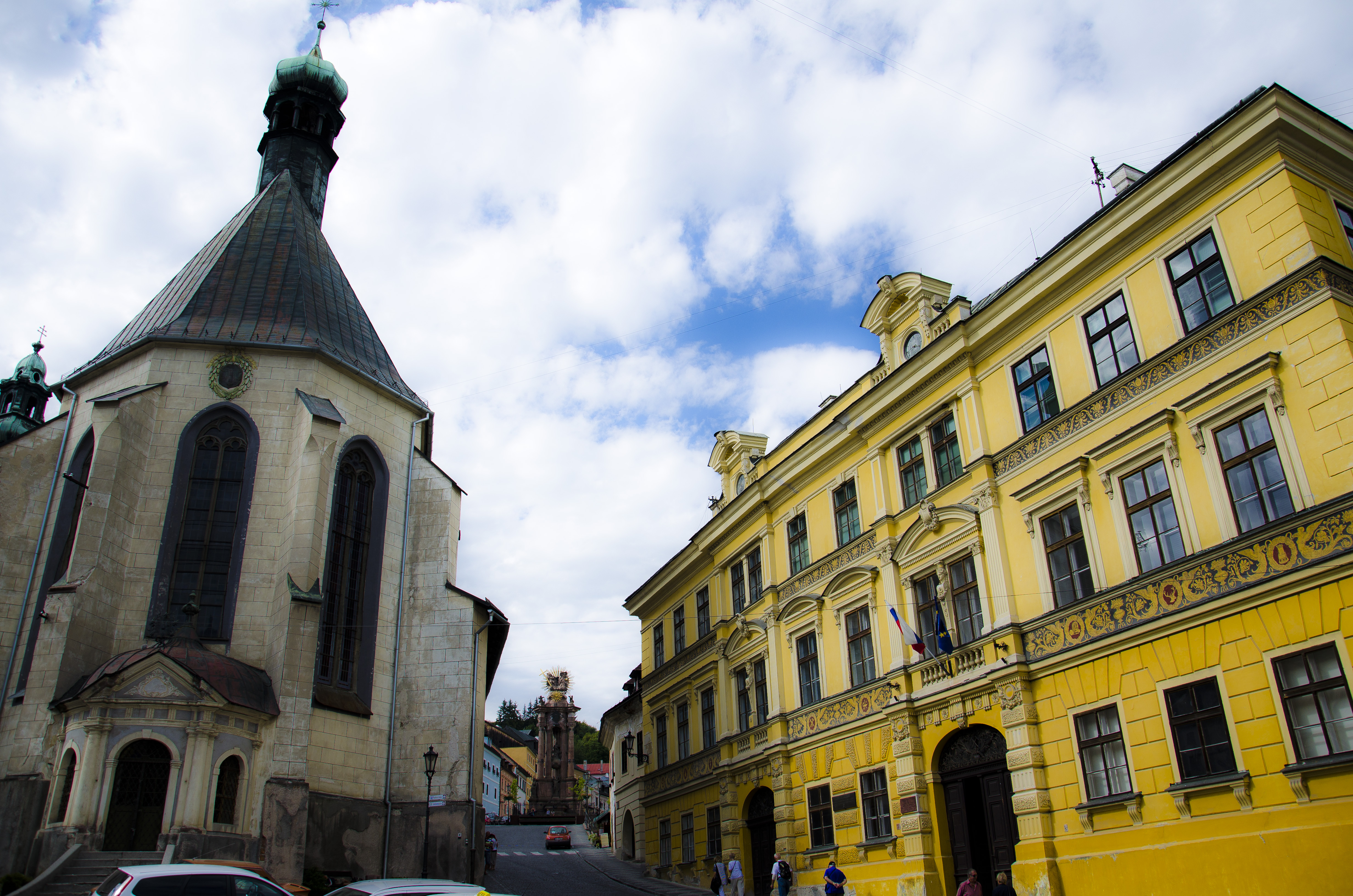
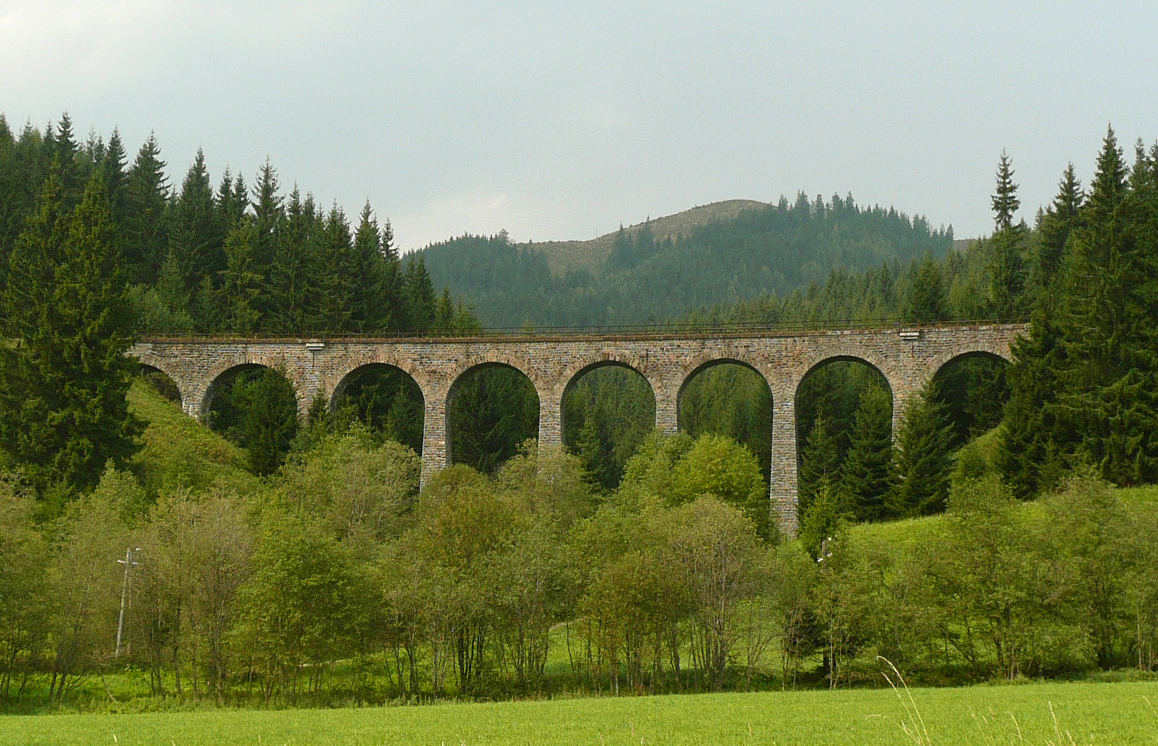
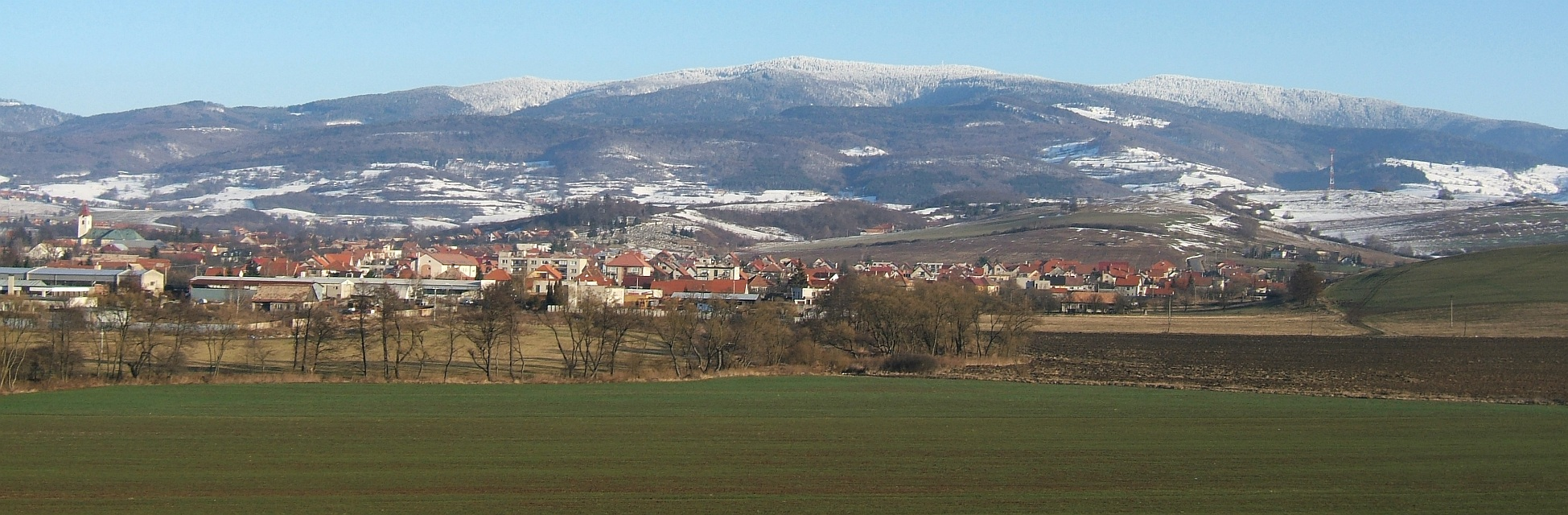
- From the top to bottom-left; Low Tatras, Banská Bystrica, Špania Dolina, Hronsek, Svätý Anton Manor House, Banská Štiavnica, Telgárt viaduct, Poľana mountain over Detva

- Flag Coat of arms

- Banská Bystrica Region
- Country: Slovakia
- Capital: Banská Bystrica

Government
  - Body: Regional Council of Banská Bystrica Region
  - Governor: Ondrej Lunter (Independent)

Area
  - Total: 9,453.96 km^{2} (3,650.19 sq mi)
- Highest elevation: 2,046 m (6,713 ft)
- Lowest elevation: 135 m (443 ft)

Population (2025)
  - Total: 607,581

GDP
  - Total: €7.121 billion (2016)
  - Per capita: €10,917 (2016)
- Time zone: UTC+1 (CET)
  - Summer (DST): UTC+2 (CEST)
- ISO 3166 code: SK-BC
- Website: www.vucbb.sk

The Banská Bystrica Region (Slovak: Banskobystrický kraj, pronounced [ˈbanskɔbistritskiː ˈkraj]; Hungarian: Besztercebányai kerület, pronounced [ˈbɛstɛrt͡sɛbaːɲɒi ˈkɛrylɛt], German: Neusohler Landschaftsverband) is one of the eight regions of Slovakia. It is the largest of the eight regions by area, and has a lower population density than any other region. The Banská Bystrica Region was established in 1923; its borders were last adjusted in 1996. Banská Bystrica consists of 514 municipalities, 24 of which have town status. Its administrative center is the eponymous town of Banská Bystrica, which is also the region's largest town. Other important towns are Zvolen and Lučenec.

== Geography ==
It is located in the central part of Slovakia and has an area of 9453.96 km^{2}. The region is prevailingly mountainous, with several ranges within the area. The highest of them are the Low Tatras in the north, where the highest point, Ďumbier, is located. Some of the mountain ranges in the west include Kremnica Mountains, Vtáčnik and Štiavnica Mountains. The Javorie and Krupina Plain ranges are located in the centre. The Slovak Ore Mountains are running from the central areas to the east, along with its subdivisions (e.g. Poľana, Veporské vrchy, Muránska planina and Spiš-Gemer Karst). Lower lying areas are located in the south, represented by the Southern Slovak Basin, running along the borders with Hungary. Major rivers are the Hron in the northern half, Ipeľ in the south and centre, Rimava and for short length Slaná in the east. As for administrative division, the region borders Žilina Region in the north, Prešov Region in the north-east, Košice Region in the east, Hungarian Borsod-Abaúj-Zemplén county in the south-east, Nógrád county in the south and Pest county in the south-west, Nitra Region in the west and Trenčín Region in the north-west.

== Population ==
Historical population
Year	Pop.	±%
1970	598,697	—
1980	636,192	+6.3%
1991	659,341	+3.6%
2001	662,121	+0.4%
2011	660,563	−0.2%
2021	625,601	−5.3%
Source: Censuses

Population statistic (10 years)
Year	1995	2005	2015	2025
Count	663,992	657,119	653,024	607,581
Difference		−1.03%	−0.62%	−6.95%

Population statistic
Year	2024	2025
Count	611,124	607,581
Difference		−0.57%

It has a population of 607,581 people (31 December 2025). The population density in the region is 64.26/km^{2} (166.4/sq mi) (2025), which is the lowest of all Slovak regions and much lower than the country's average (110 per km^{2}). The largest towns are Banská Bystrica, Zvolen, Lučenec and Rimavská Sobota.

=== Ethnicity ===
Census 2021 (1+ %)
Ethnicity	Number	Fraction
Slovak	518,258	82.84%
Hungarian	72,173	11.53%
Not found out	35,722	5.71%
Romani	22,227	3.55%
Total	625,601	

In year 2021 was 625,601 people by ethnicity 518,258 as Slovak, 72,173 as Hungarian, 35,722 as Not found out, 22,227 as Romani, 4249 as Czech, 1688 as Other, 813 as Russian, 704 as German, 666 as Ukrainian, 598 as Rusyn, 406 as Polish, 235 as Italian, 225 as Vietnamese, 183 as Moravian, 172 as English, 151 as Chinese, 151 as Romanian, 140 as Jewish, 116 as Serbian, 116 as Austrian, 93 as Croatian, 92 as French, 89 as Turkish, 82 as Irish, 78 as Bulgarian, 70 as Albanian, 55 as Canadian, 51 as Greek, 15 as Silesian, 9 as Iranian and 2 as Korean.

Note on population: The difference values of population numbers in the table "Population statistic" and in the sections "Ethnicity" & "Religion" is caused by the use of various statistical methods.

=== Religion ===
Census 2021 (1+ %)
Religion	Number	Fraction
Roman Catholic Church	314,326	50.24%
None	180,067	28.78%
Evangelical Church	59,482	9.51%
Not found out	40,654	6.5%
Calvinist Church	9153	1.46%
Greek Catholic Church	7026	1.12%
Total	625,601	

In year 2021 was 625,601 people by religion 314,326 from Roman Catholic Church, 180,067 from None, 59,482 from Evangelical Church, 40,654 from Not found out, 9153 from Calvinist Church, 7026 from Greek Catholic Church, 2145 from Christian Congregations in Slovakia, 2111 from Jehovah's Witnesses, 1761 from Ad hoc movements, 1560 from Other, 1413 from Other and not ascertained christian church, 1122 from Eastern Orthodox Church, 959 from Baptists Church, 699 from Buddhism, 596 from Seventh-day Adventist Church, 560 from Paganism and natural spirituality, 458 from United Methodist Church, 372 from Islam, 281 from Apostolic Church, 243 from Church of the Brethren, 224 from Old Catholic Church, 138 from Jewish community, 116 from Hinduism, 59 from Czechoslovak Hussite Church, 45 from Bahá'i Community, 24 from Church of Jesus Christ of Latter-day Saints and 7 from New Apostolic Church.

== Politics ==
The governor of Banská Bystrica region is Ondrej Lunter (Independent). He won with 48.5 %. In election 2022 was elected also regional parliament:

Regional Council of Banská Bystrica region

Type
- Type: Unicameral
- Houses: Regional Council

Leadership
- Governor: Ondrej Lunter, Independent

Structure
- Seats: 49
- Political groups: Independent group (14) Centre-right group (11) Voice (11) Alliance (9) Non-affiliated (4)

Elections
- Last election: 29 October 2022

Meeting place
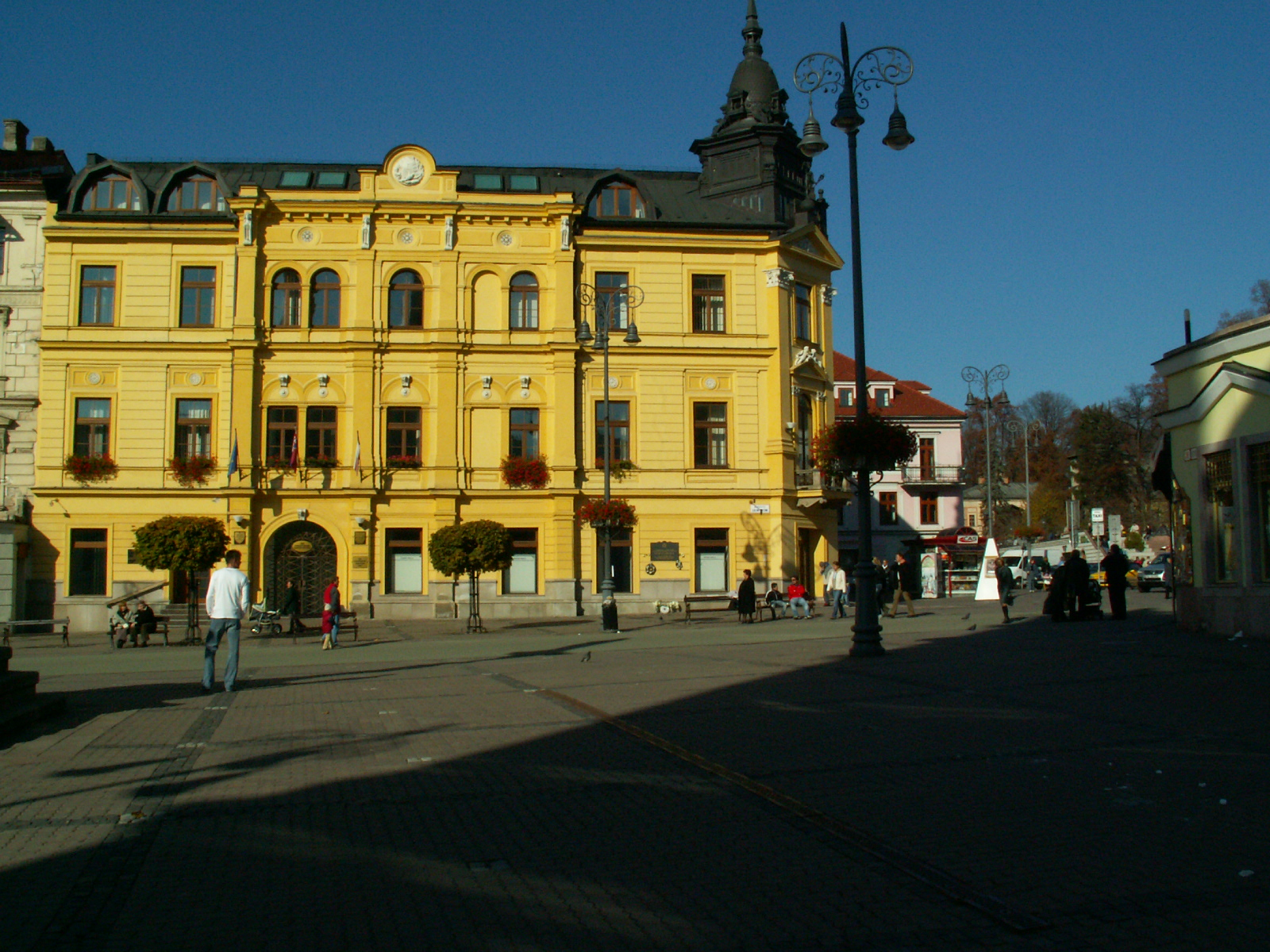
- Governor's office, Banská Bystrica

Website
- Council of Banská Bystrica region

In 2013, Marian Kotleba of the far-right People's Party Our Slovakia won the election of Governor of Banská Bystrica Region. Kotleba's win was described as a "shock" by political analysts, who attributed it to deep anti-Romani sentiments in the region. Kotleba was defeated in the Slovak regional elections of 2017 by an independent candidate, Ján Lunter.

== Administrative division ==
The Banská Bystrica Region consists of 13 districts (okresy).

There are 514 municipalities, of which 24 are towns, where 56% of the region's population lives.

District	Area [km^{2}]	Population
Banská Bystrica	809.44	106,000
Banská Štiavnica	292.29	15,258
Brezno	1265.24	57,517
Detva	449.14	30,199
Krupina	584.89	21,129
Lučenec	825.55	68,259
Poltár	476.28	19,951
Revúca	730.09	37,528
Rimavská Sobota	1471.07	79,222
Veľký Krtíš	848.14	40,235
Zvolen	759.02	65,001
Žarnovica	425.08	24,327
Žiar nad Hronom	517.65	42,955

Population and area values are current for year 2025.

== Places of interest ==
- Banská Bystrica with Banská Bystrica Castle, Saint Francis Xavier Cathedral, Museum of the Slovak National Uprising, etc.
- Hronsek with its castles, articular church and belfry (UNESCO World Heritage Site)
- Zvolen Castle
- Kremnica with Saint Catherine Church, Kremnica Mint, etc.
- Hronský Beňadik Monastery
- Banská Štiavnica (UNESCO World Heritage Site)
- Svätý Anton manor house
- Modrý Kameň Castle
- Lučenec Synagogue
- Gemer churches with the medieval wall paintings: Medieval churches in Rákoš, Chyžné, Kameňany, Rimavské Brezovo, Rimavská Baňa, Rimavské Janovce, Kyjatice, Kraskovo, etc.
- Predná Hora mansion
- Telgárt viaduct
- Špania Dolina - a town with a mining tradition
- Low Tatras National Park
- Muránska Planina National Park
- Greater Fatra National Park
- Cerová vrchovina Protected Landscape Area
- Poľana Protected Landscape Area
- Štiavnické vrchy Protected Landscape Area
- Fiľakovo castle, Fiľakovo Castle Museum

== Photo gallery ==
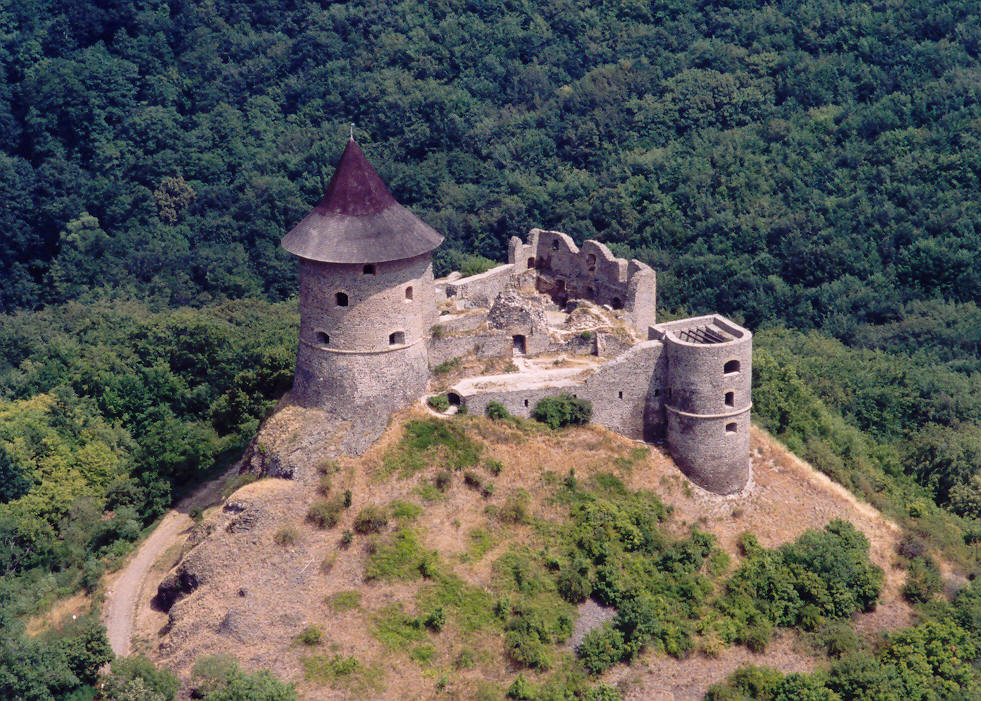
Šomoška Castle

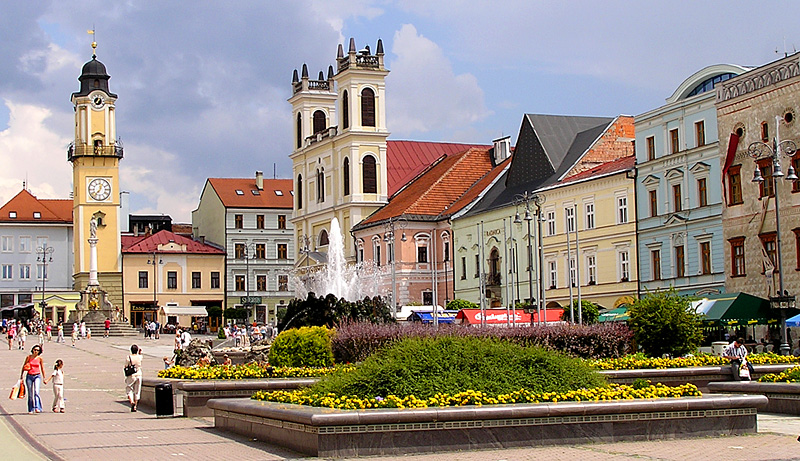
Banská Bystrica

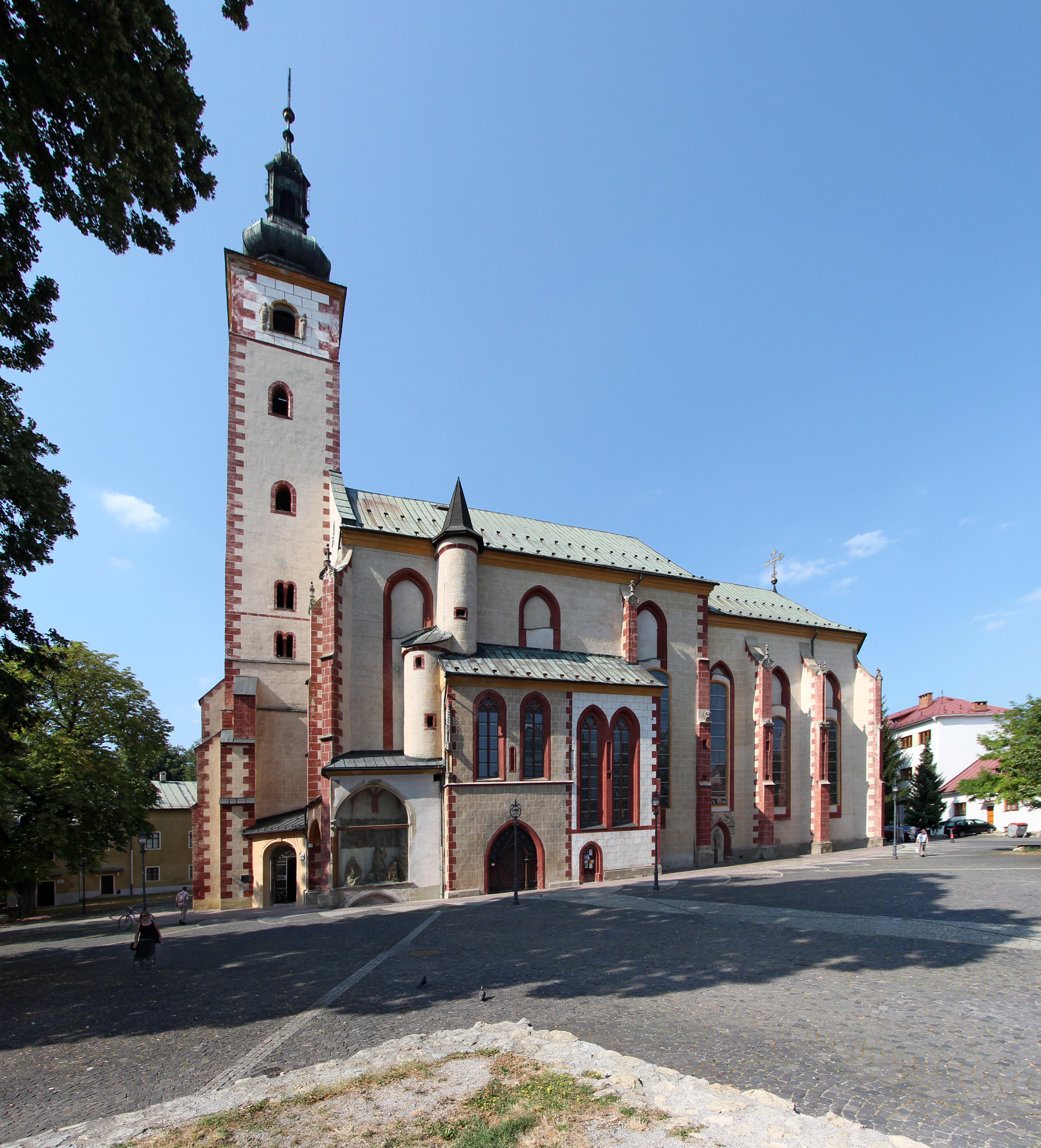
Banská Bystrica

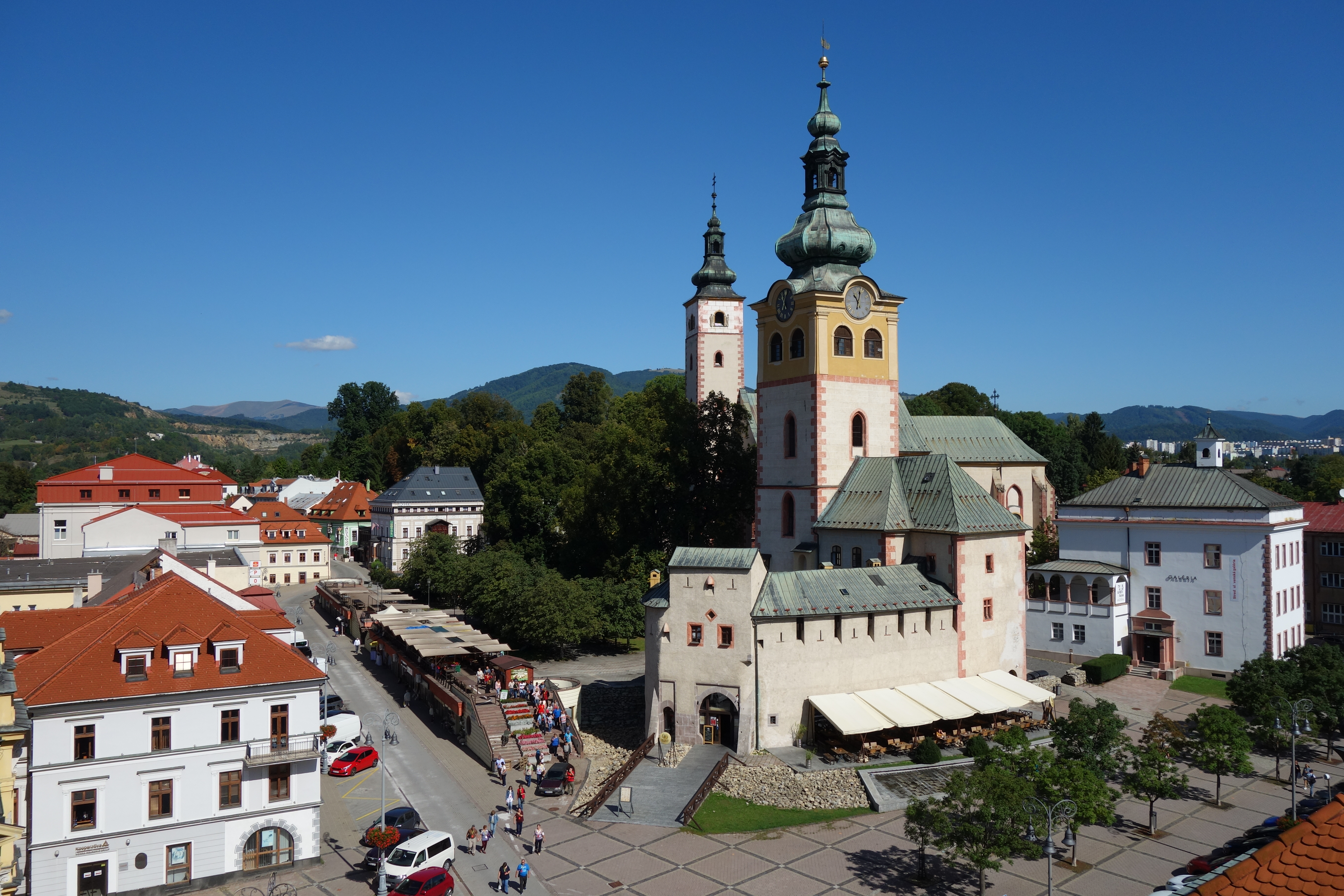
Banská Bystrica Castle

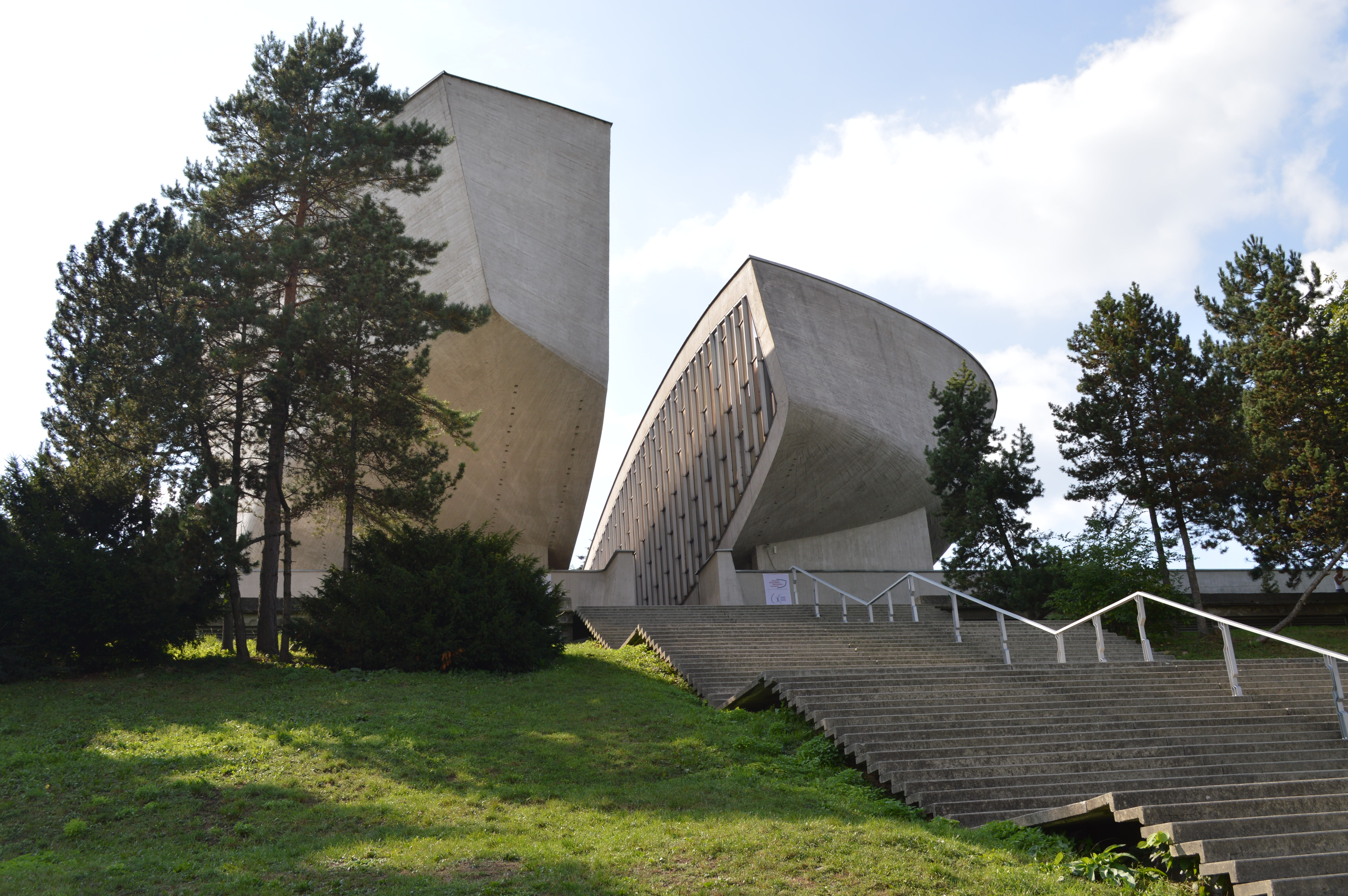
Museum of the Slovak National Uprising, Banská Bystrica

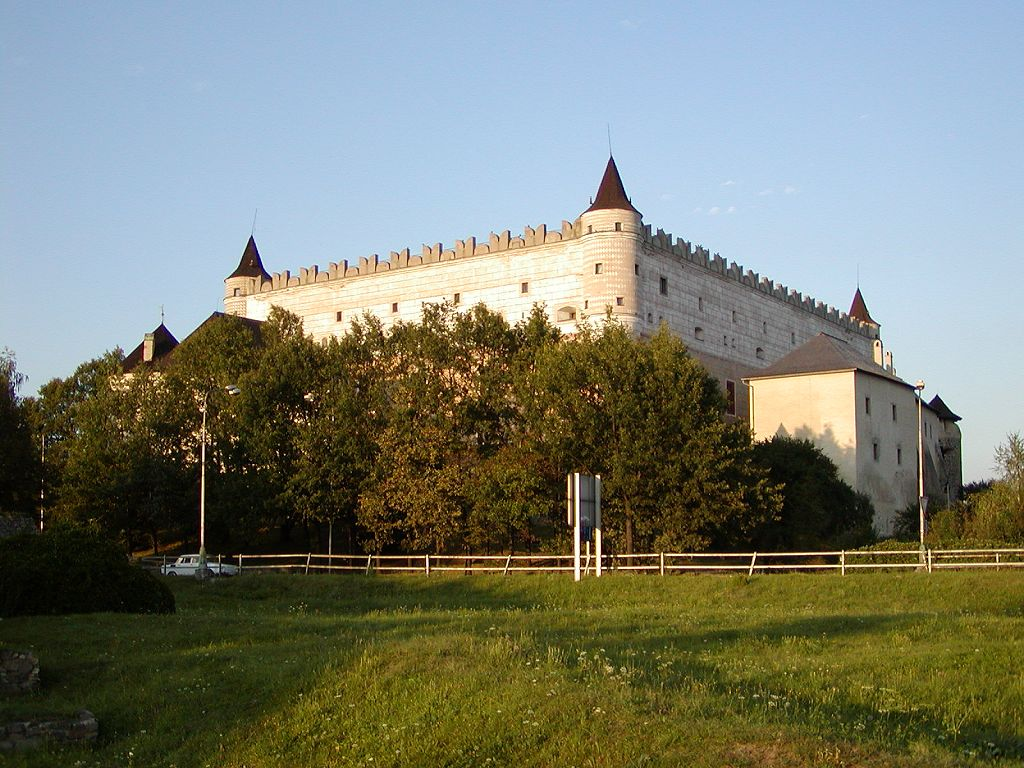
Zvolen Castle

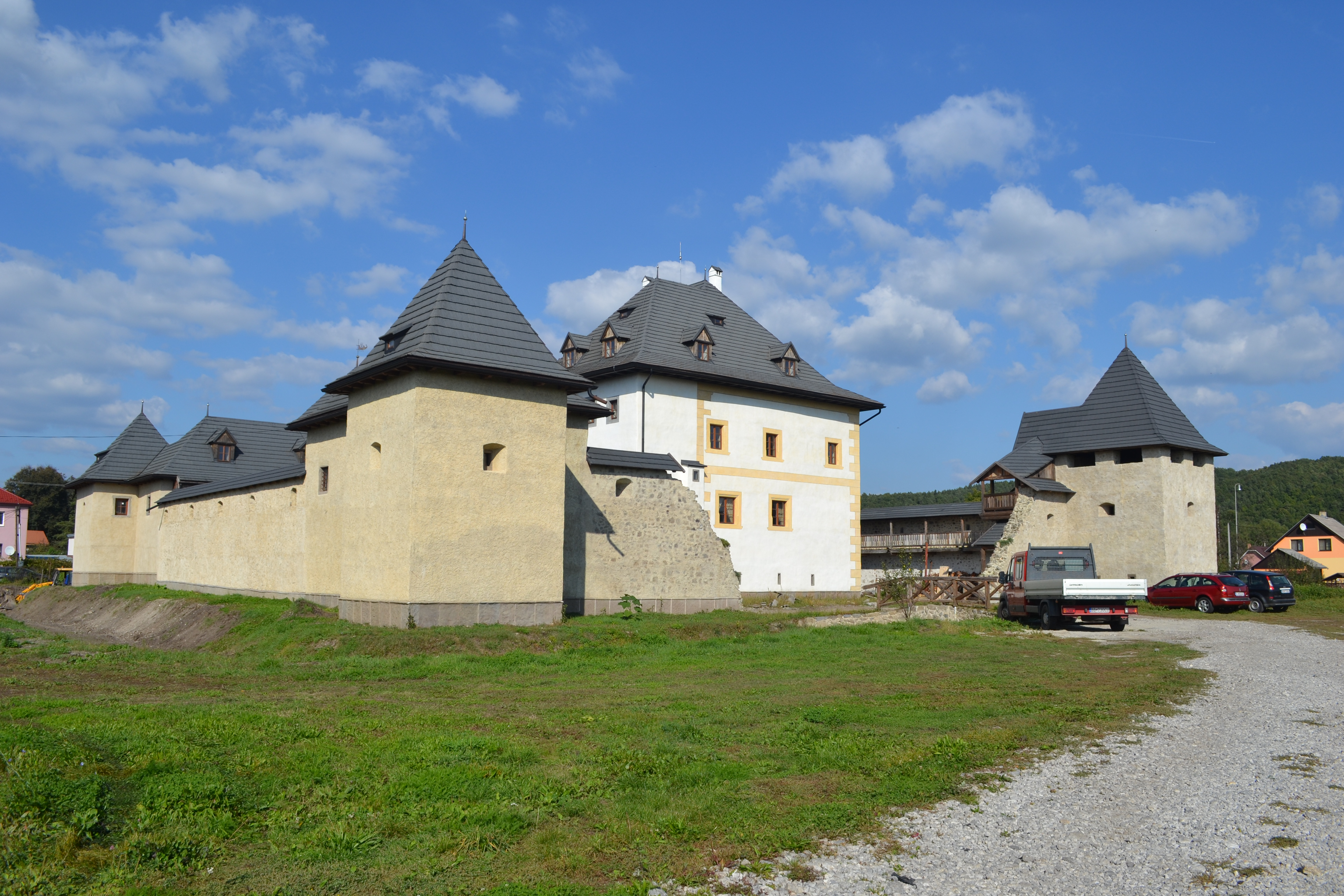
Hronsek Castle

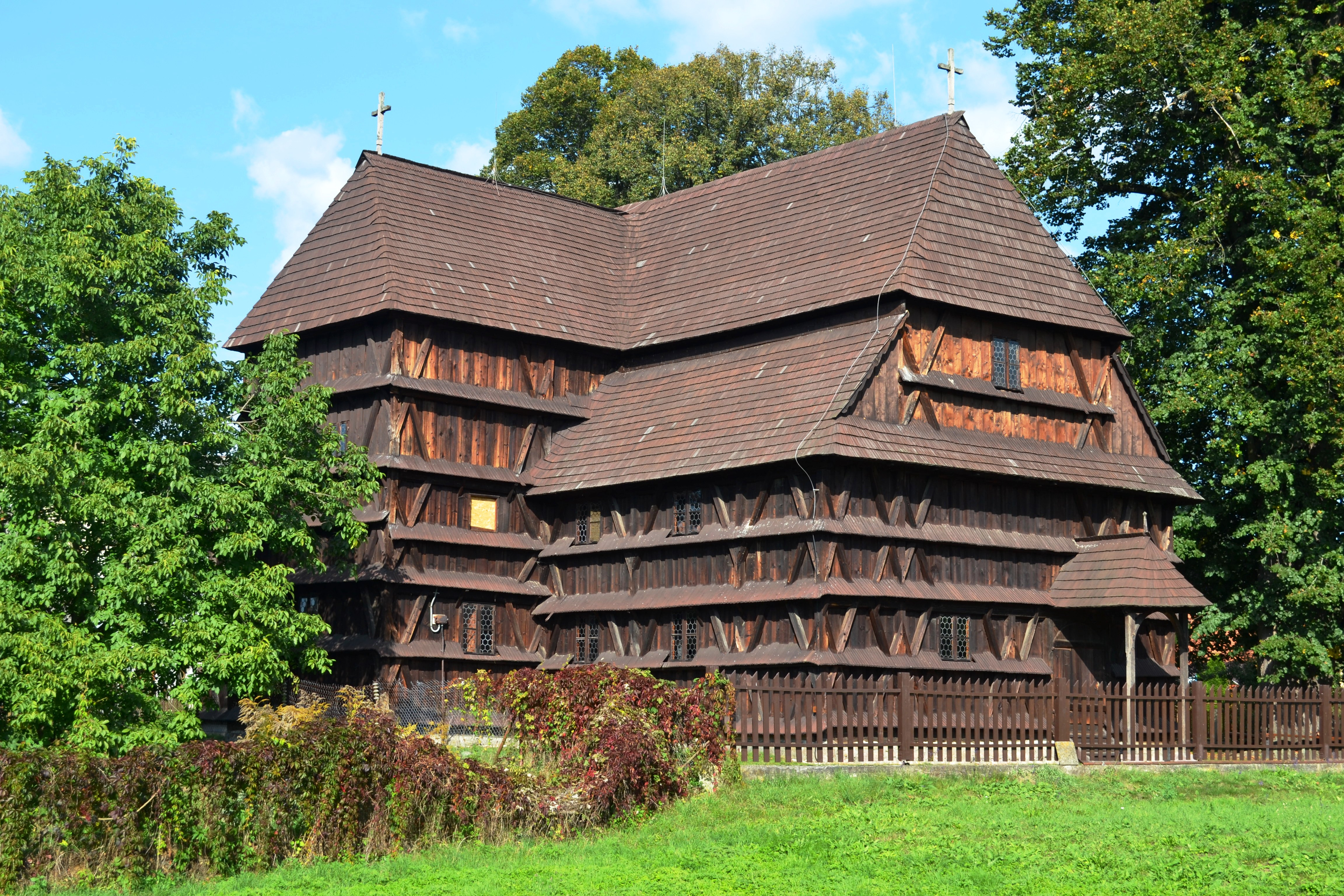
Hronsek wooden articular church (UNESCO World Heritage Site)

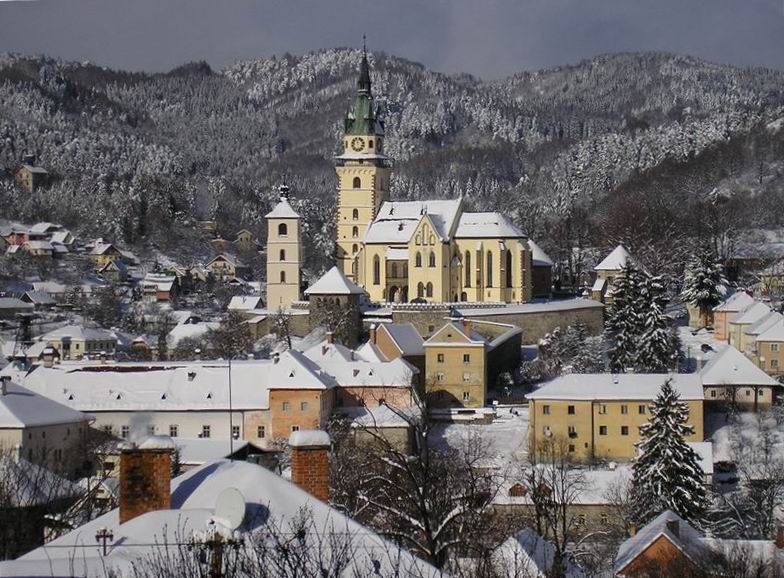
Kremnica

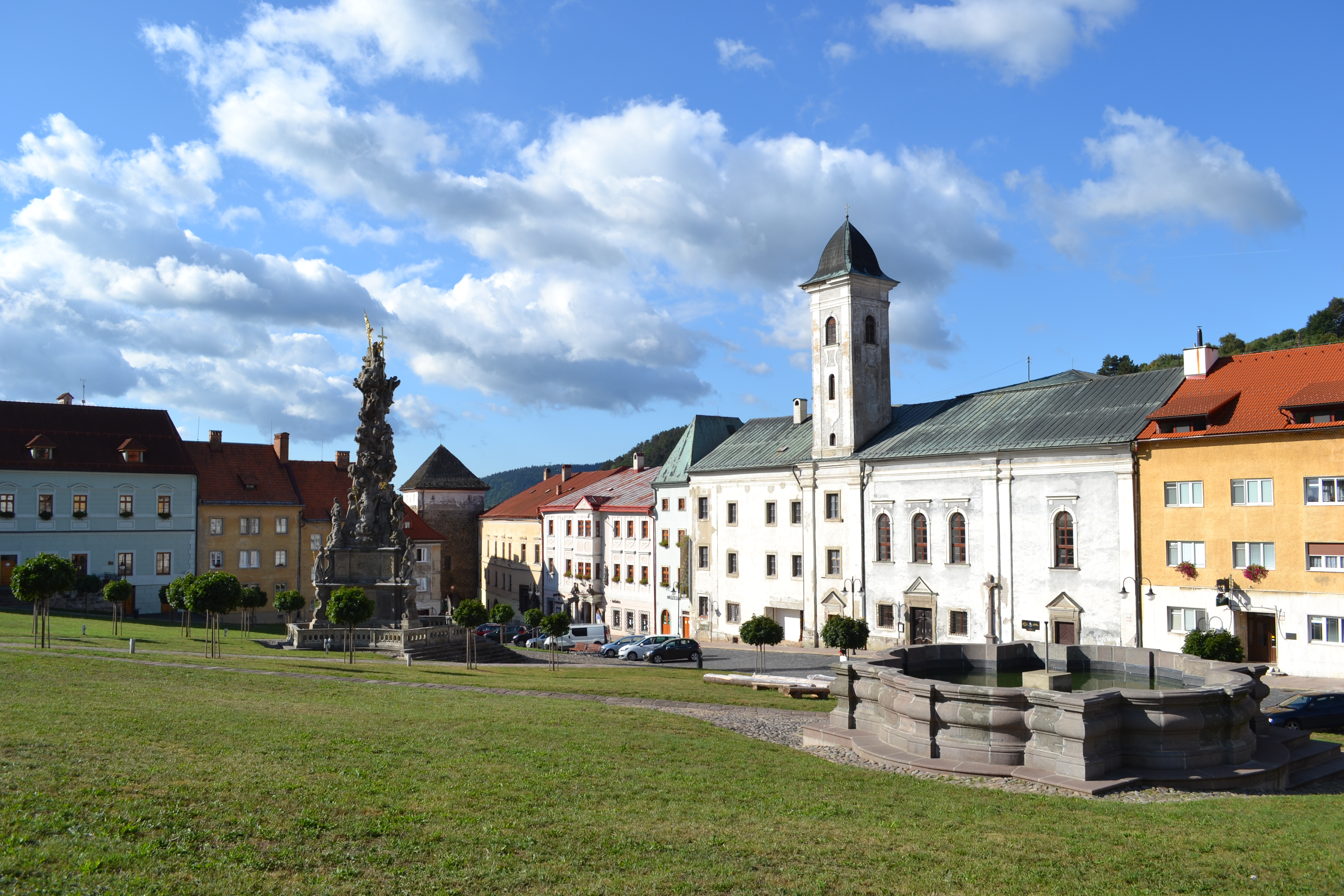
Kremnica

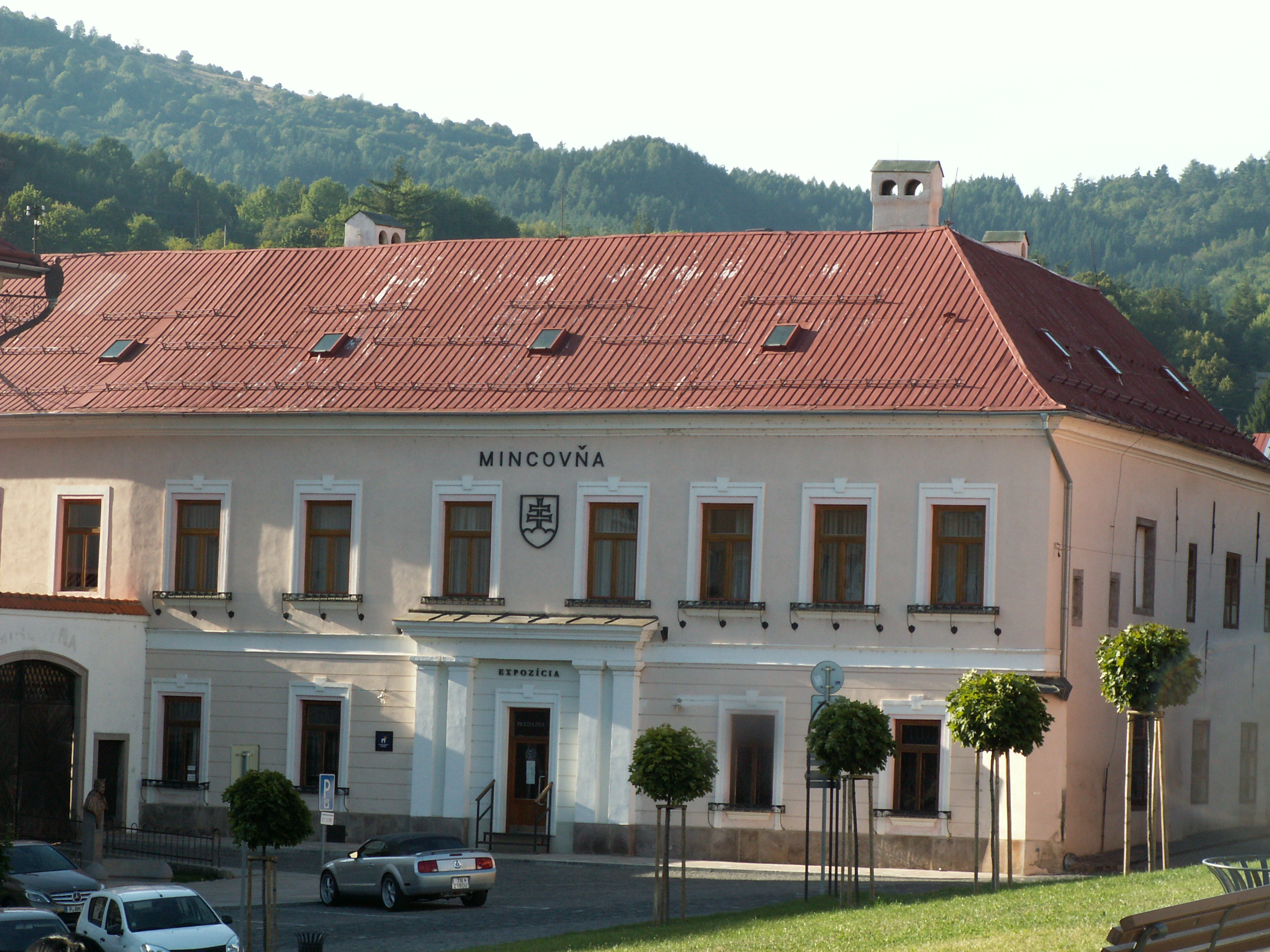
Kremnica mint

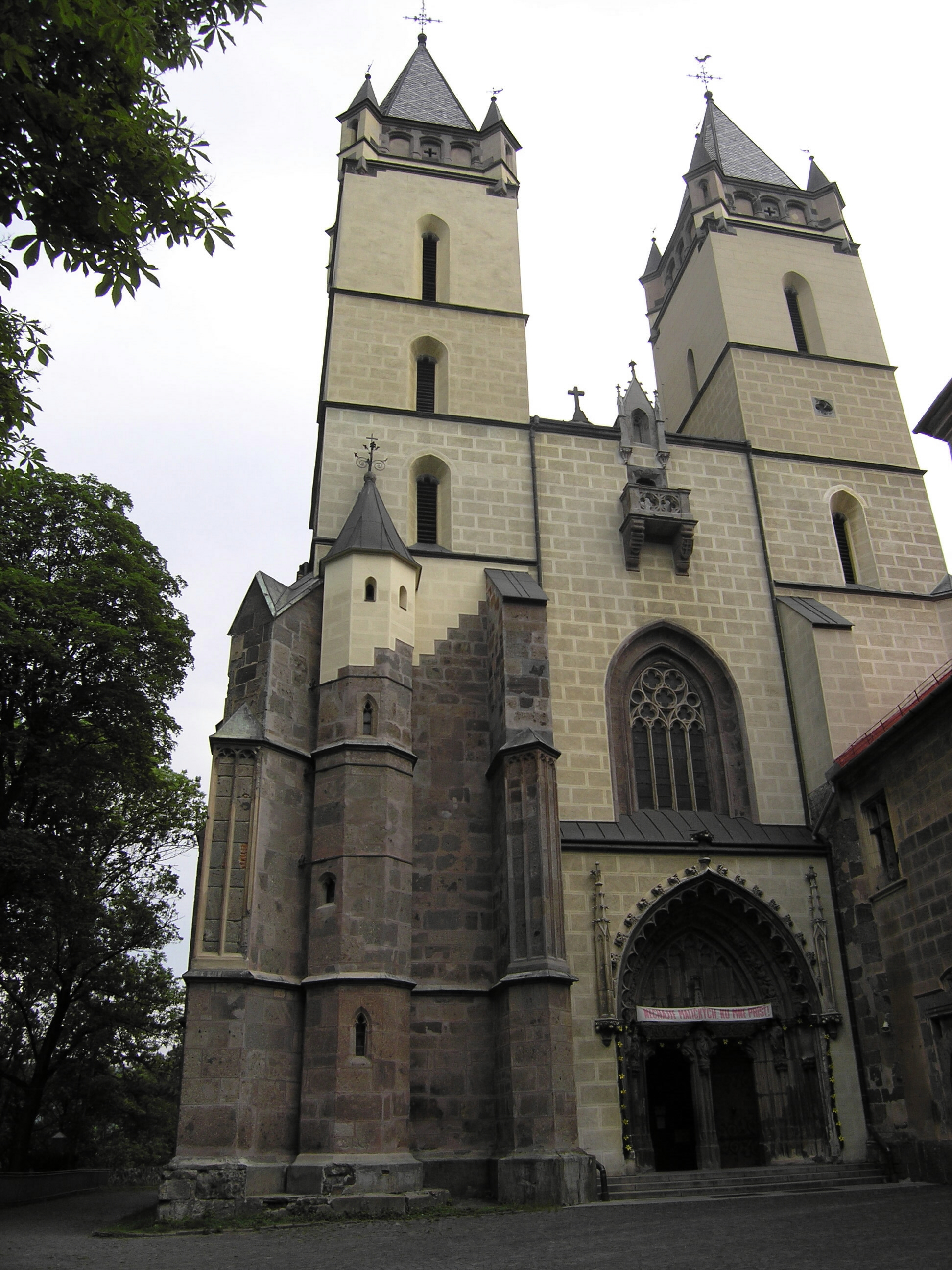
Hronský Beňadik monastery

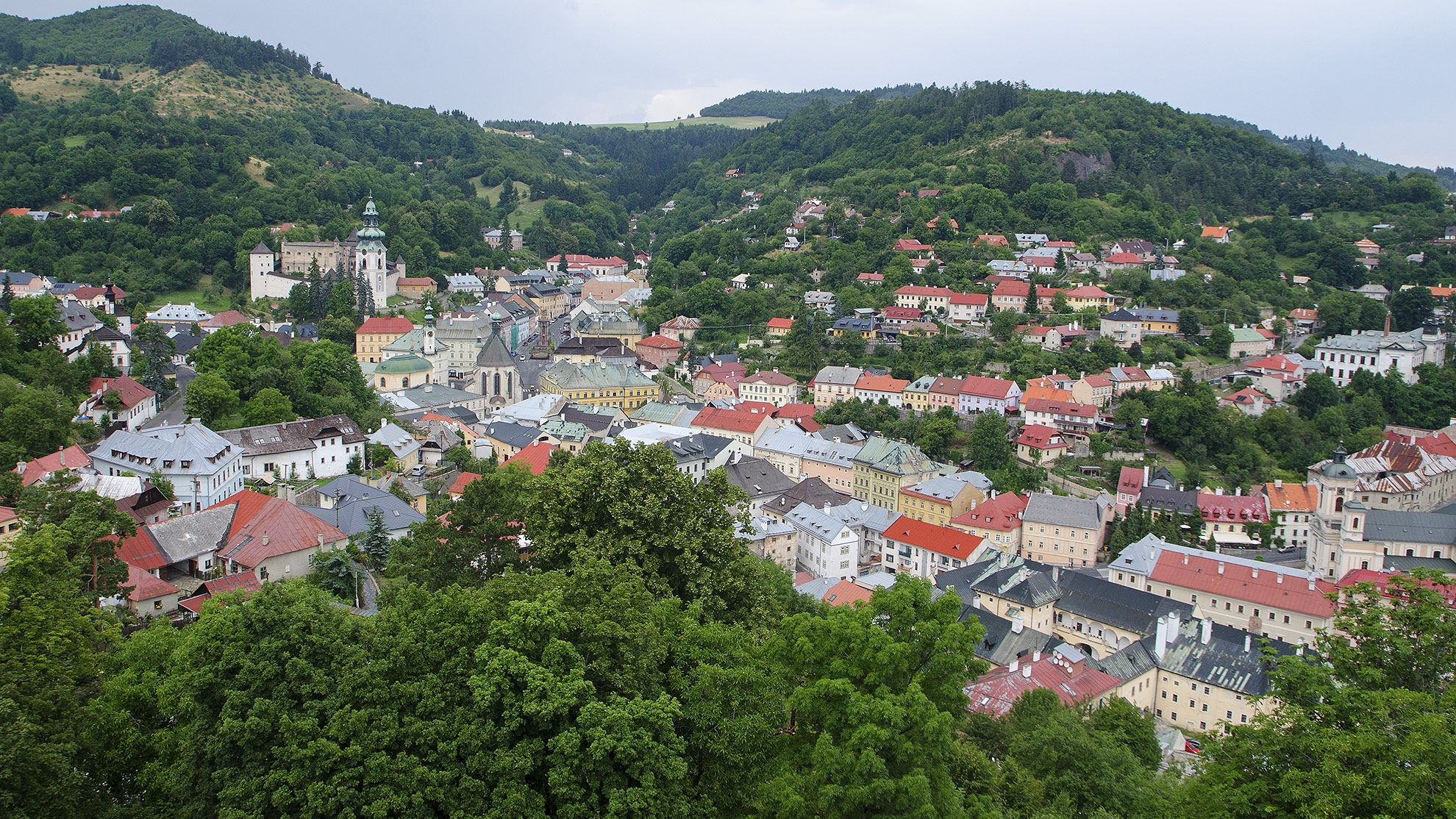
Banská Štiavnica (UNESCO World Heritage site)

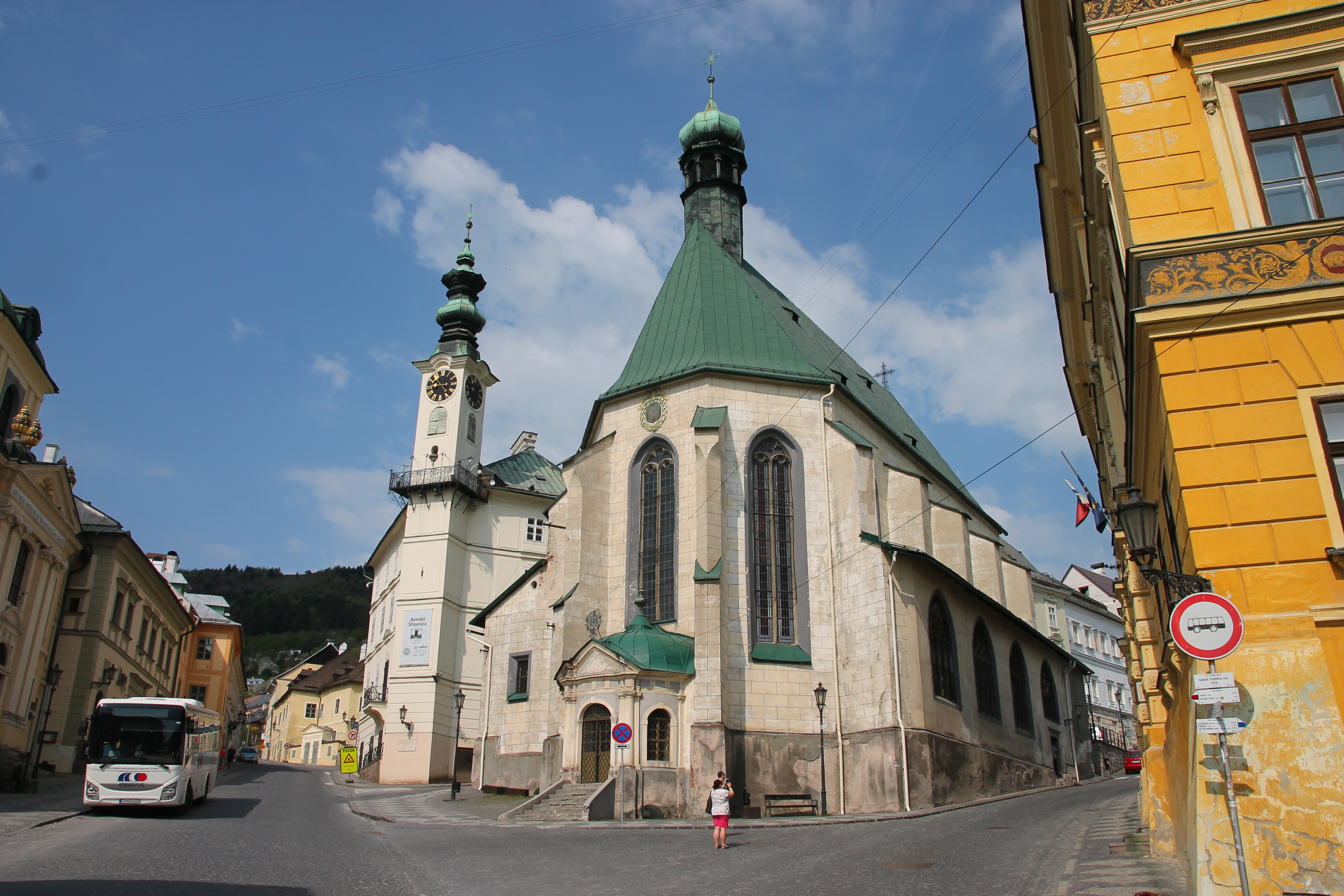
Banská Štiavnica

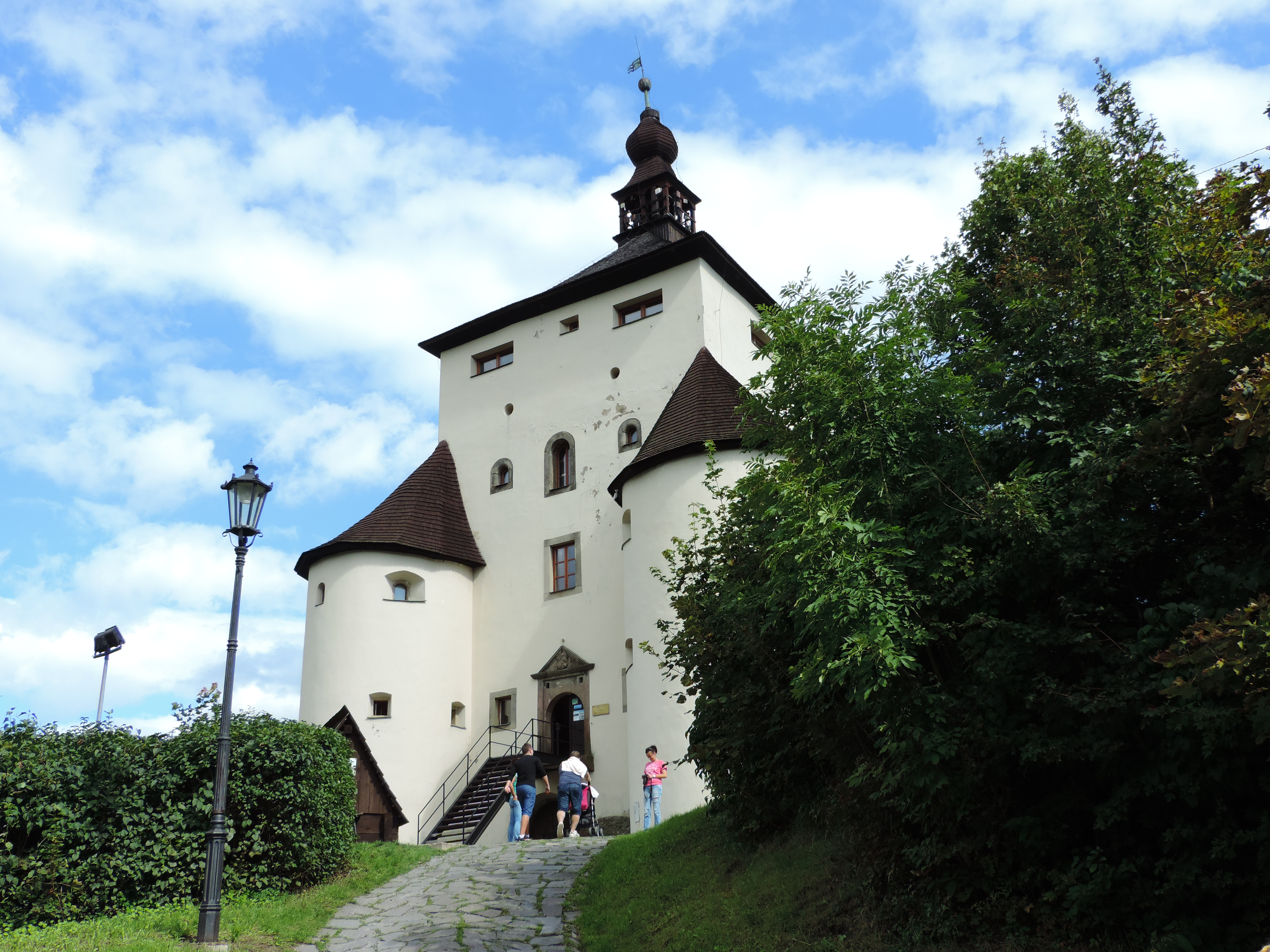
New Castle, Banská Štiavnica

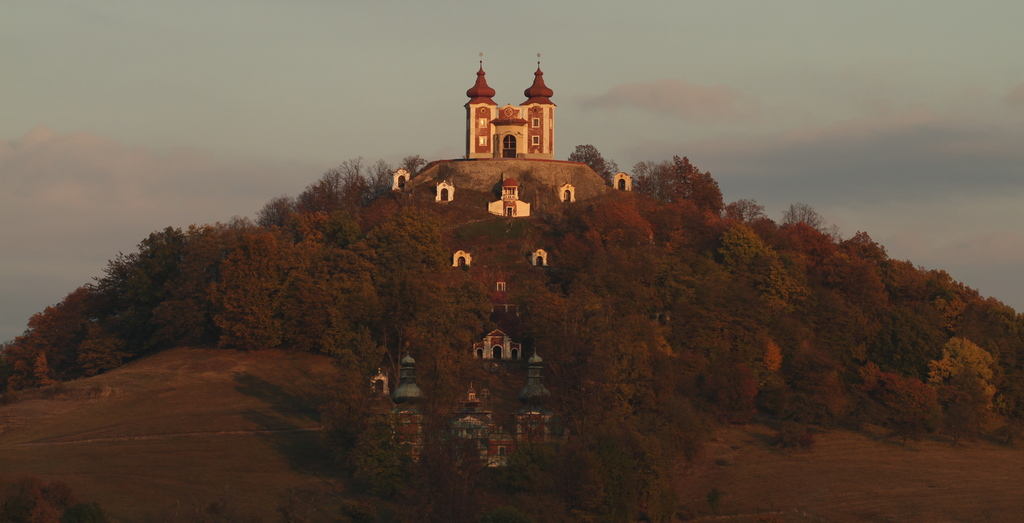
Banská Štiavnica calvary

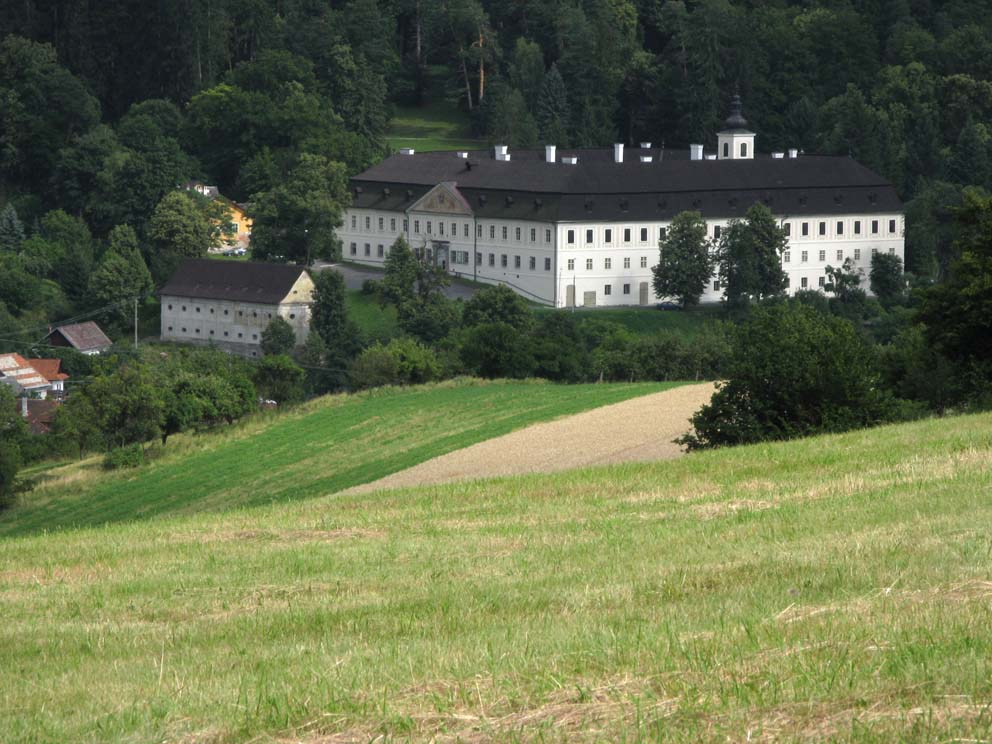
Svätý Anton manor house

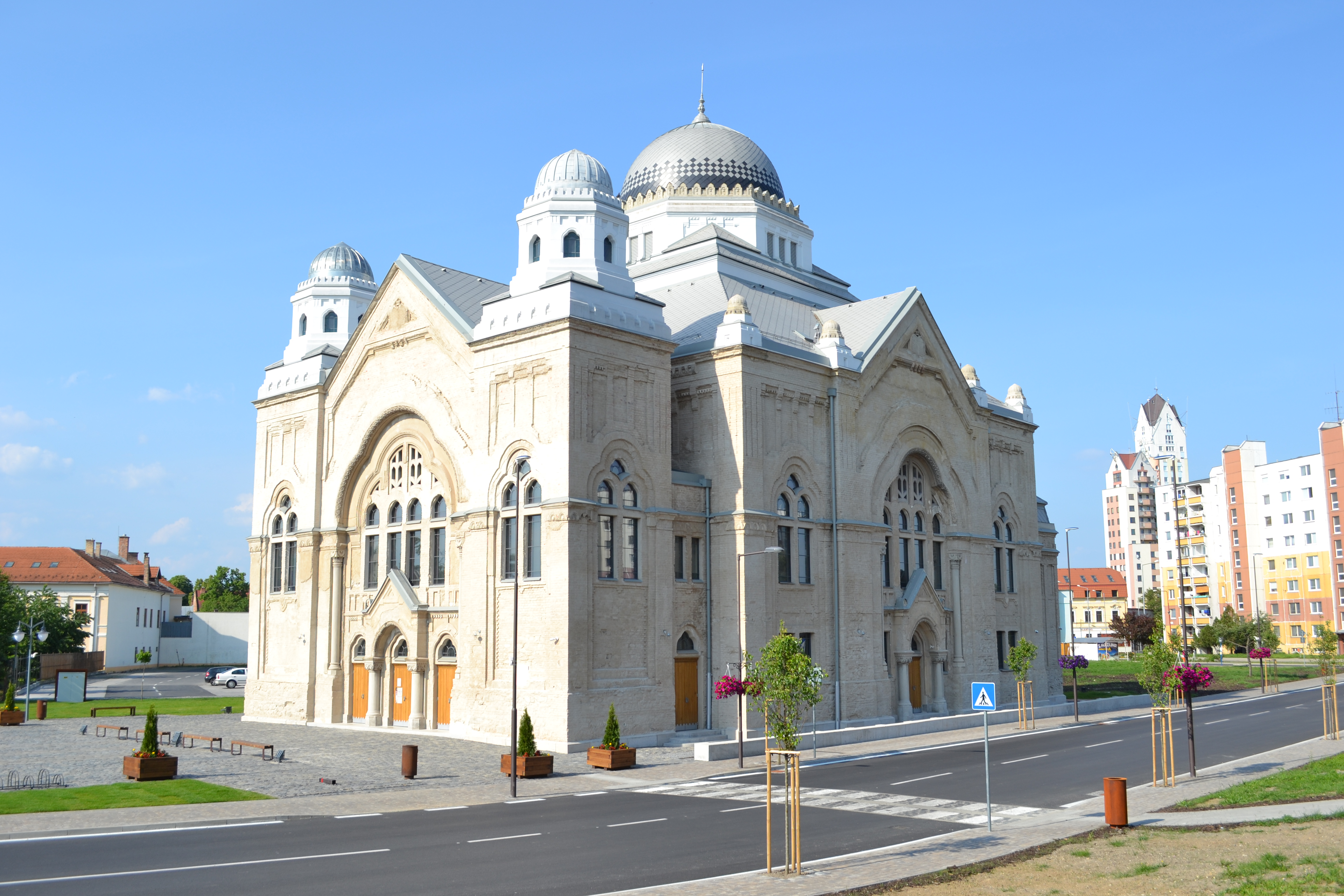
Lučenec Synagogue

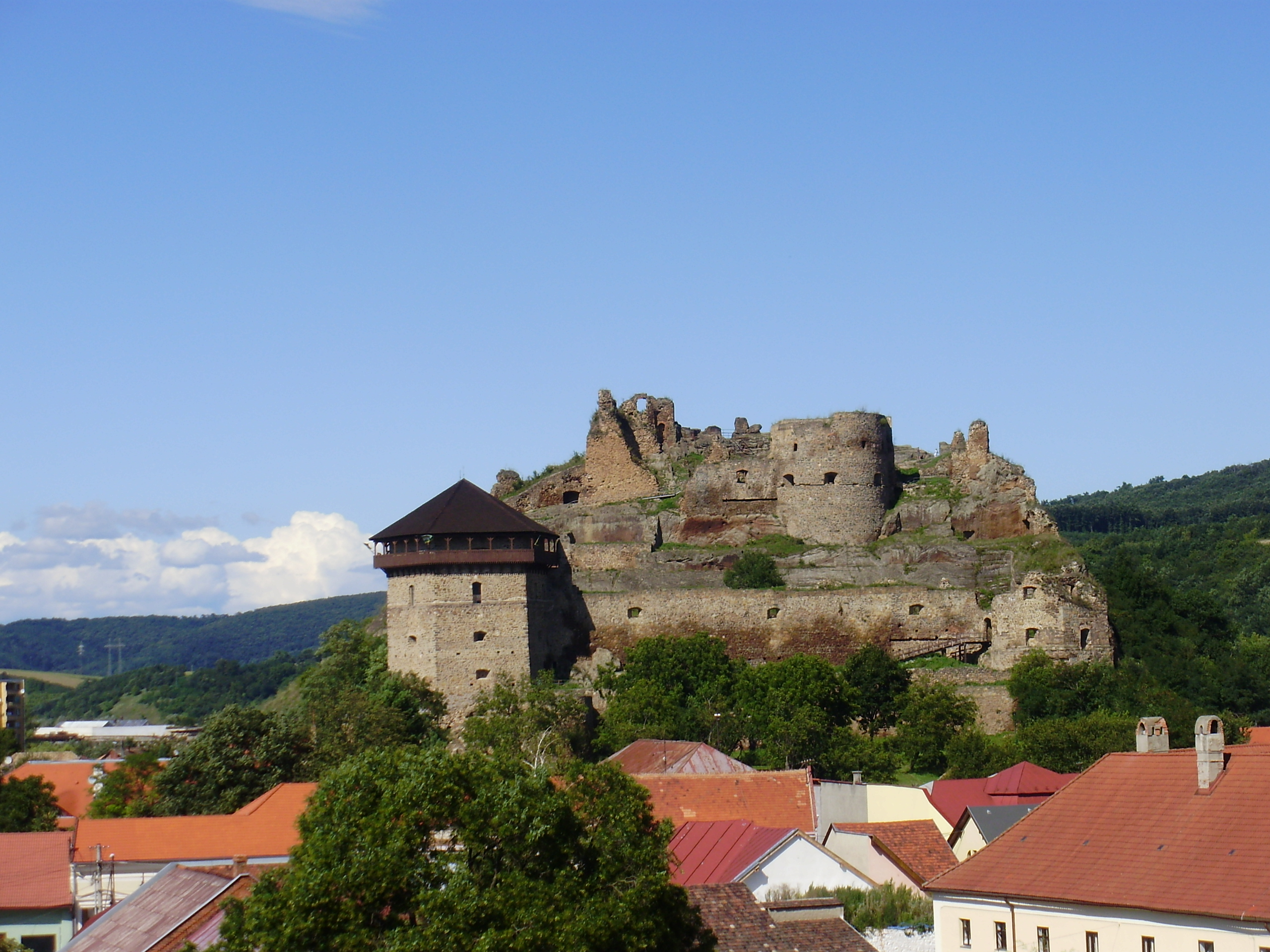
Fiľakovo Castle

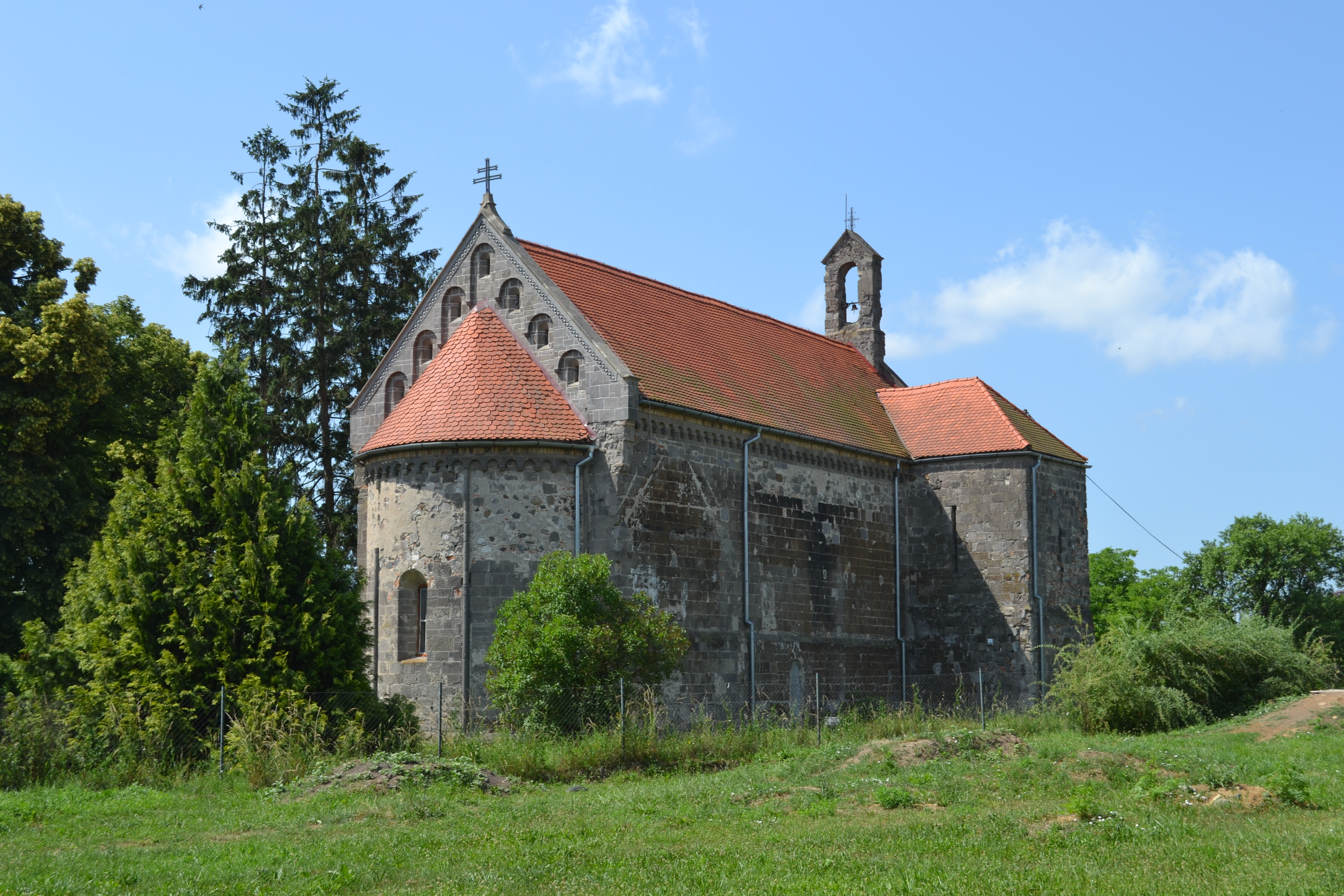
Medieval church in Rimavské Janovce

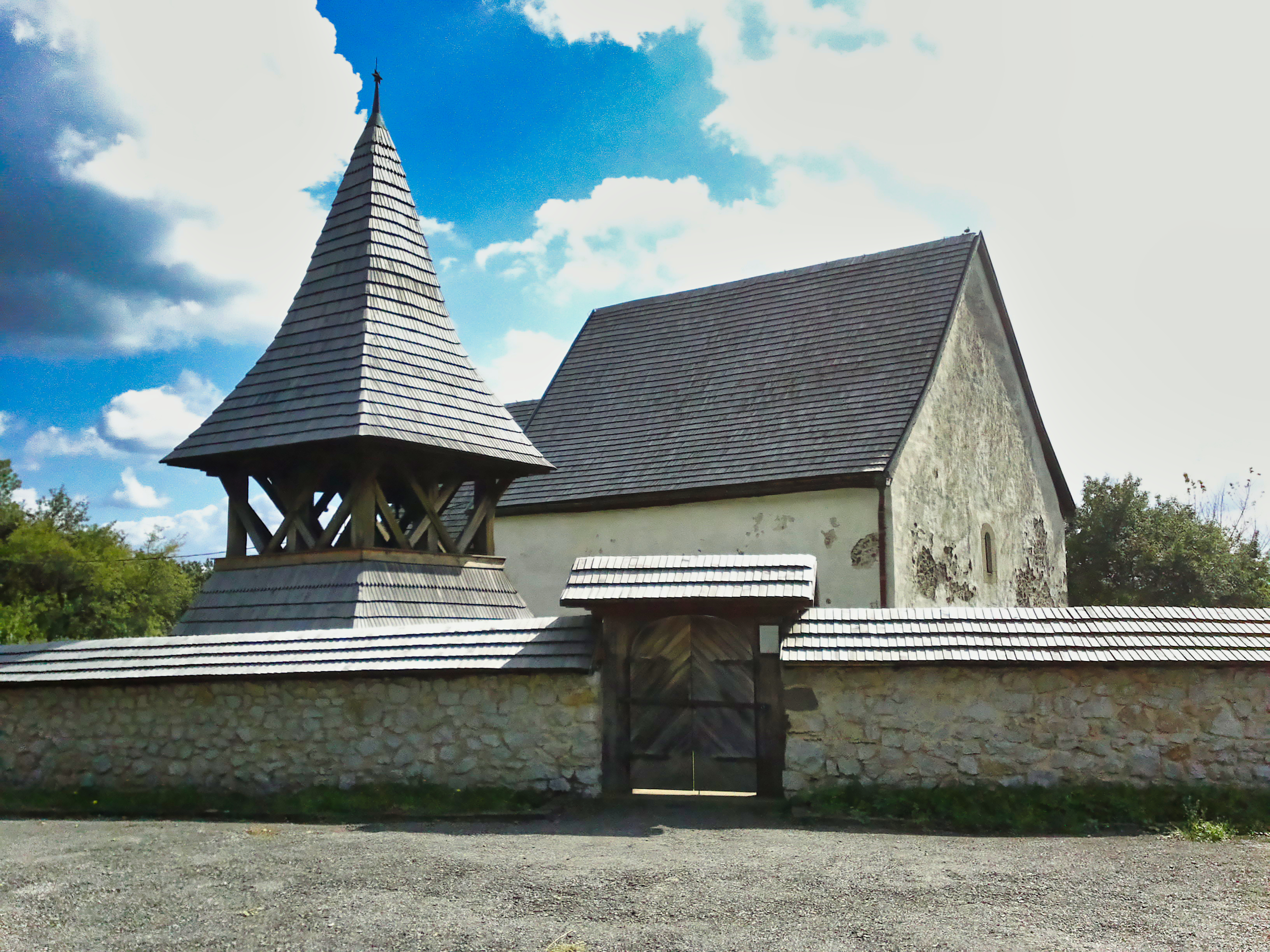
Medieval church in Kraskovo

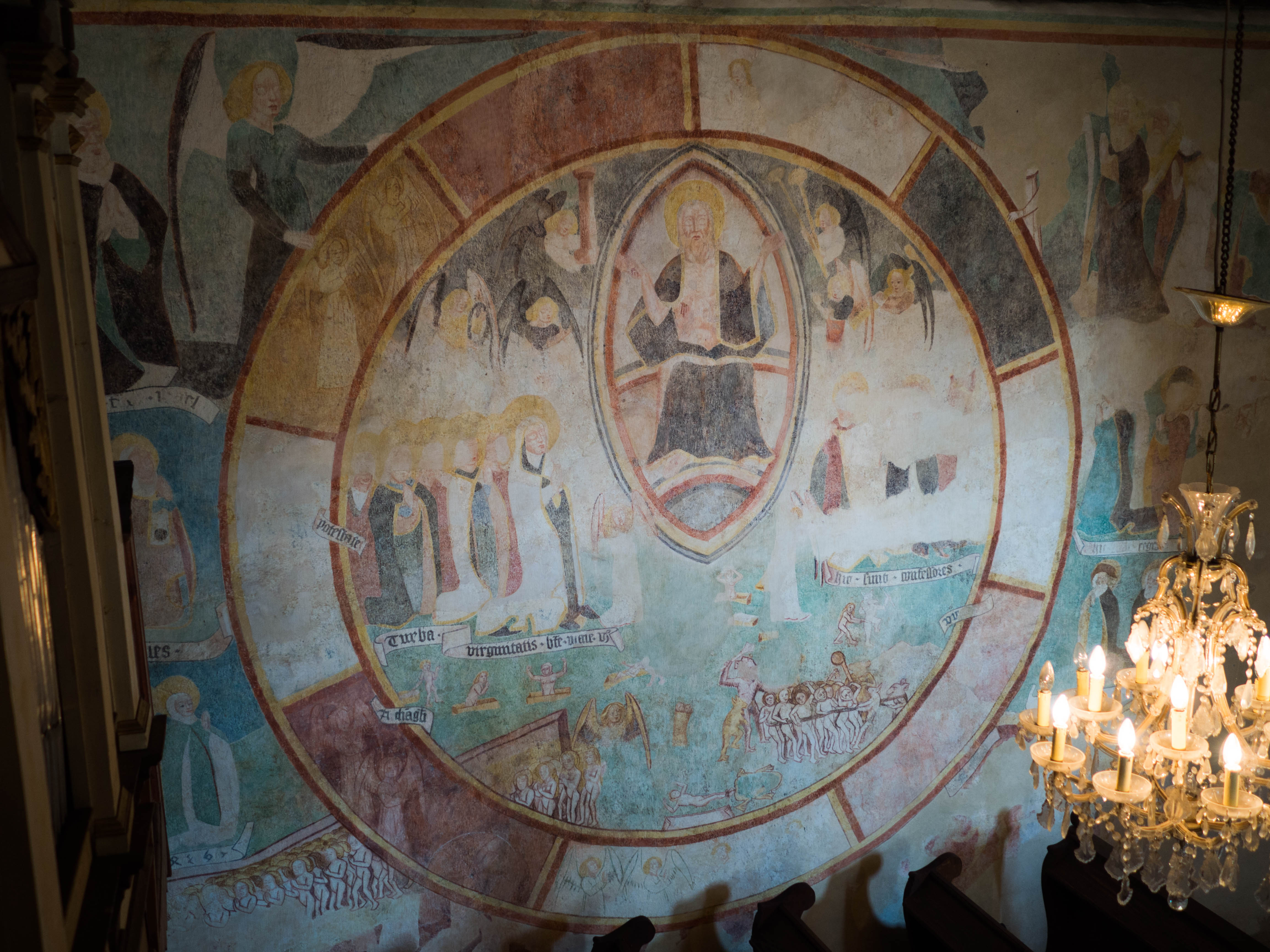
Medieval church in Kyjatice

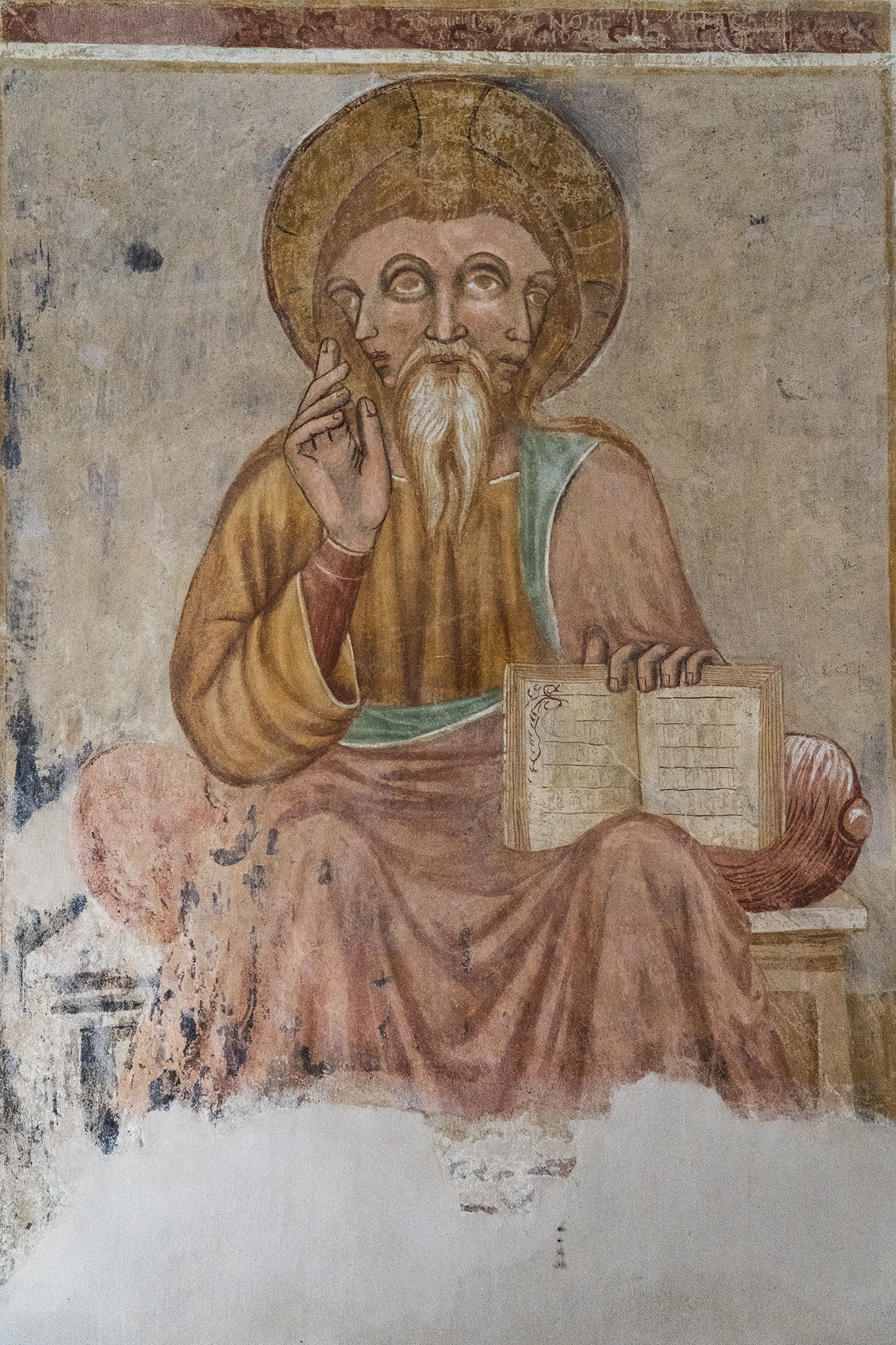
Medieval church in Rákoš

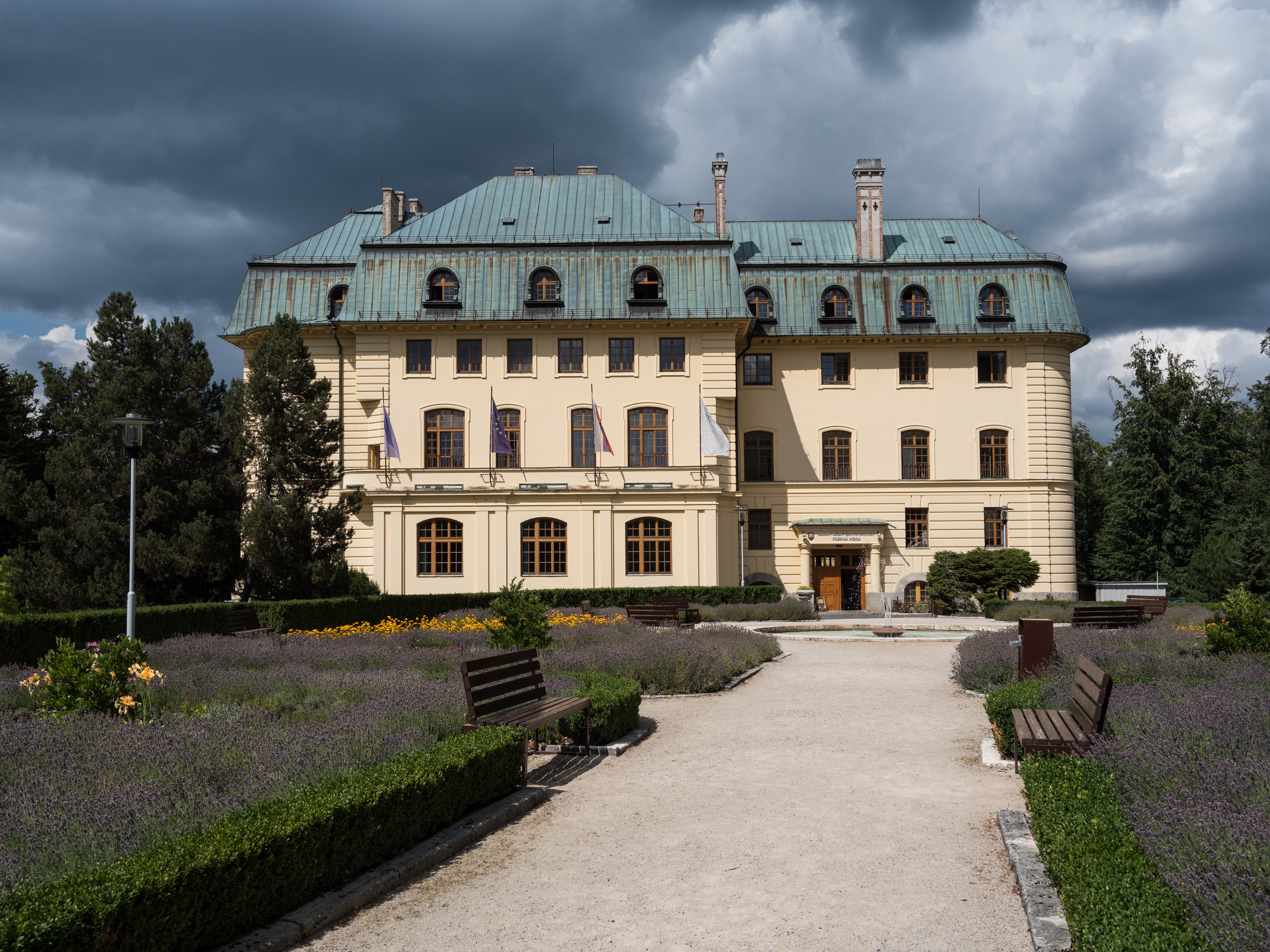
Predná Hora mansion

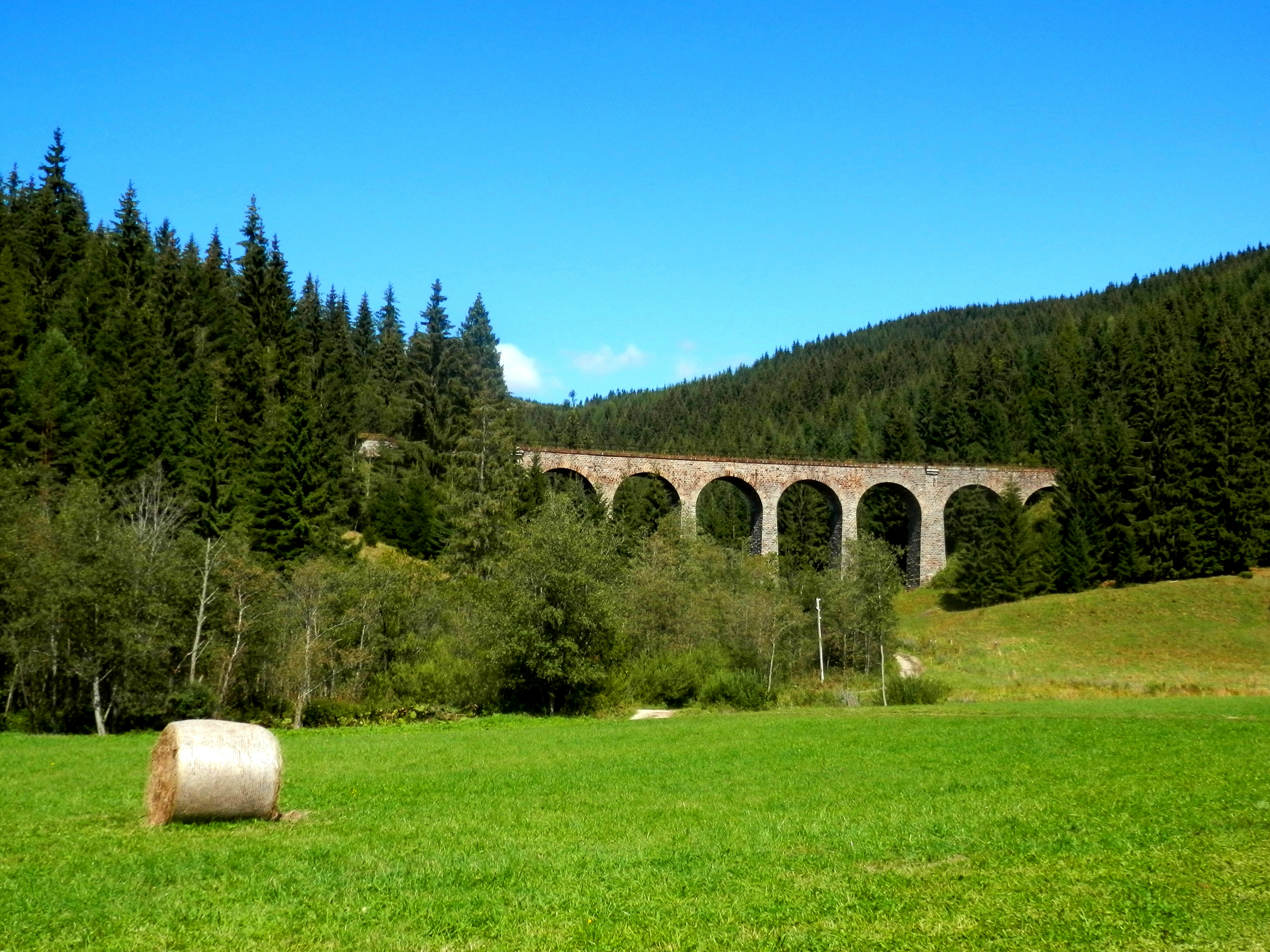
Railway viaduct in Telgárt

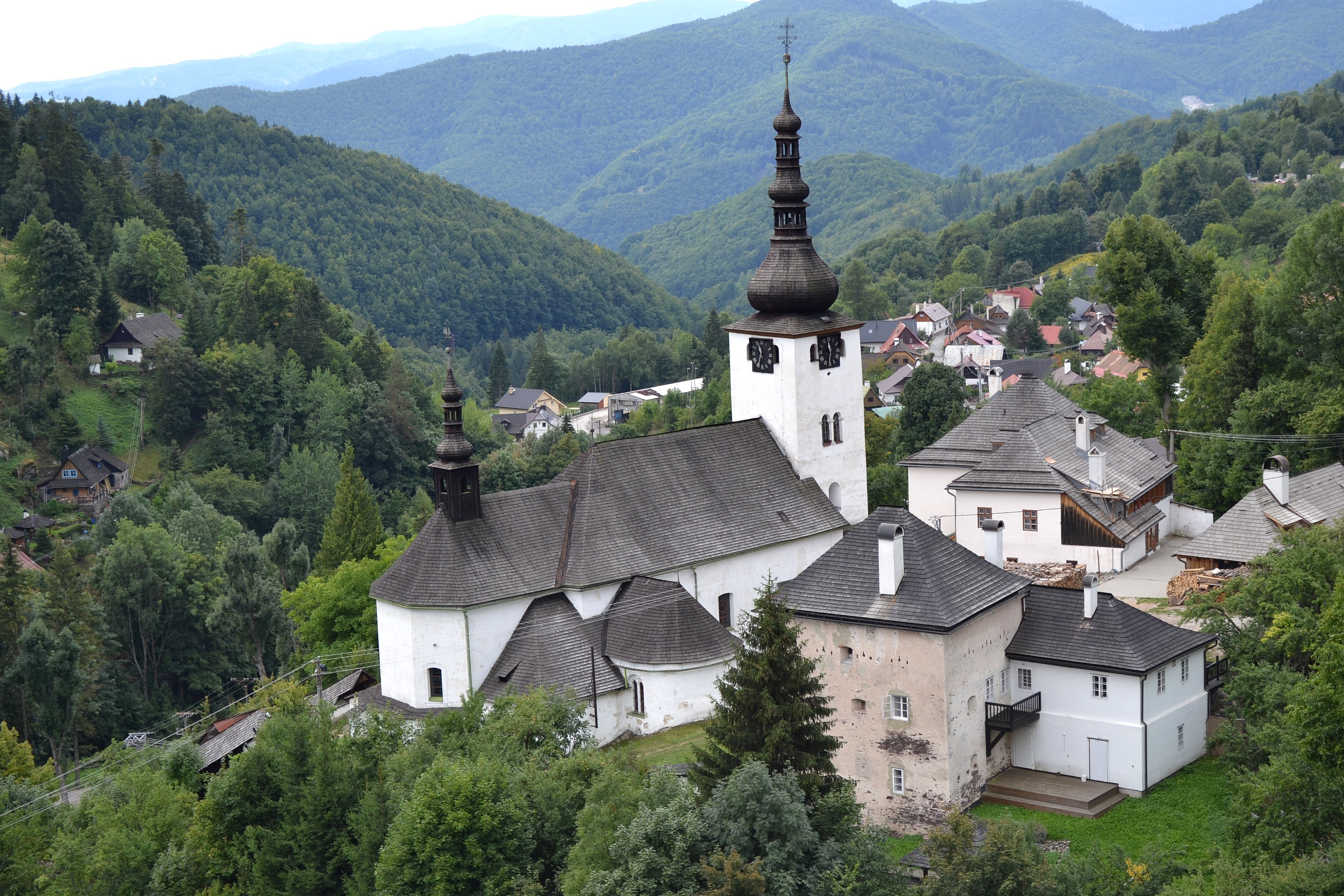
Špania Dolina

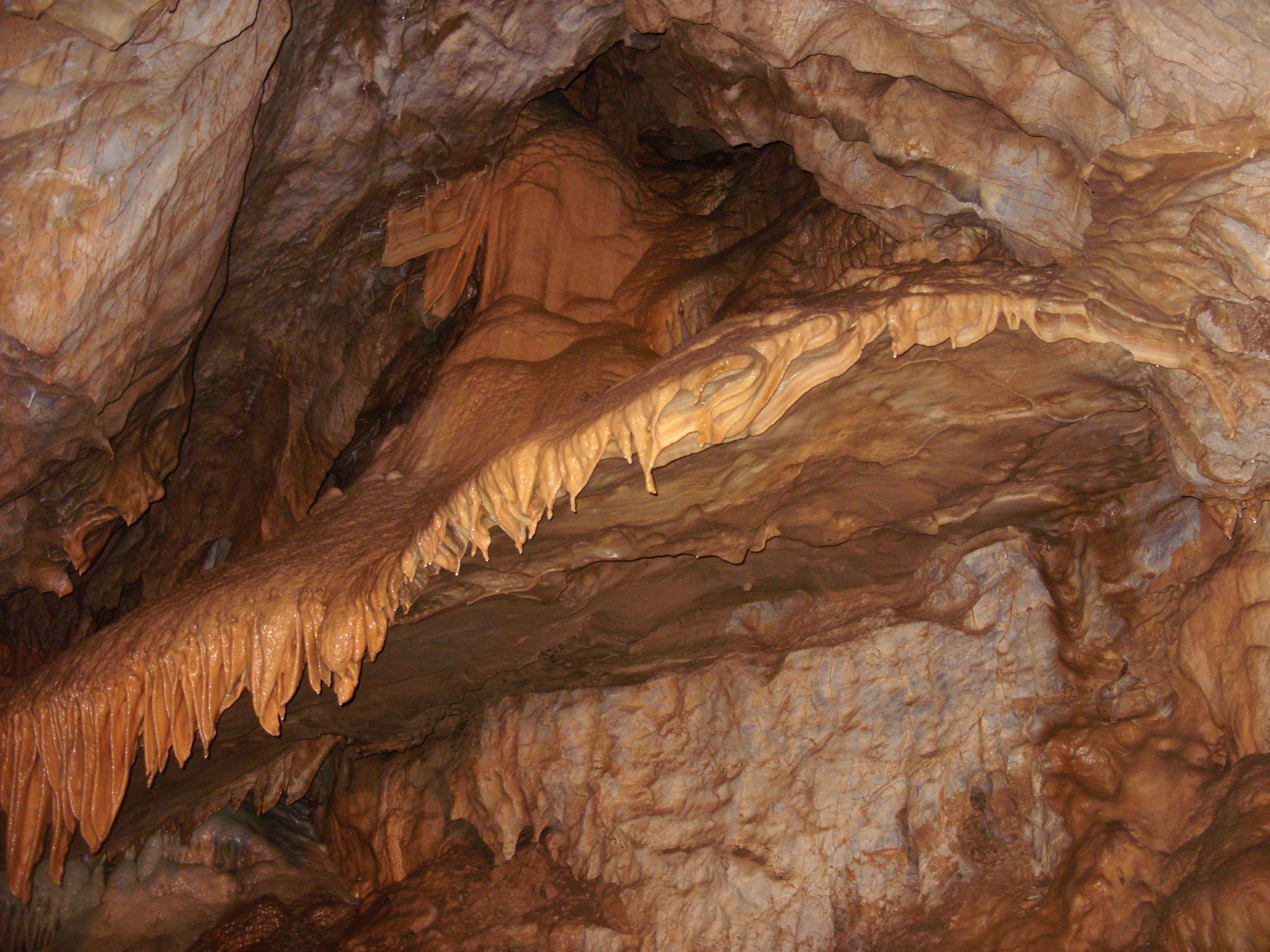
Bystrianska Cave

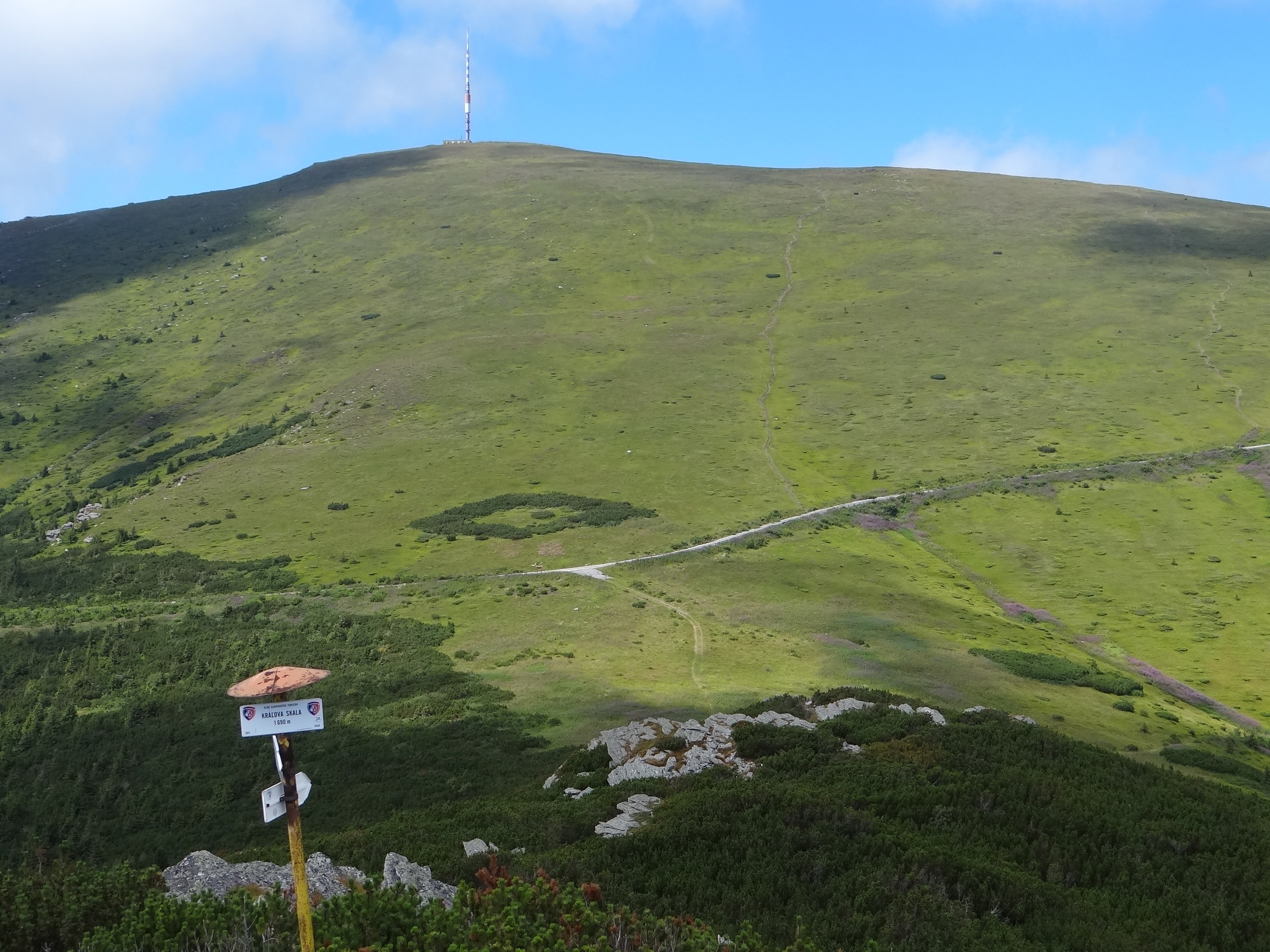
Low Tatras National Park

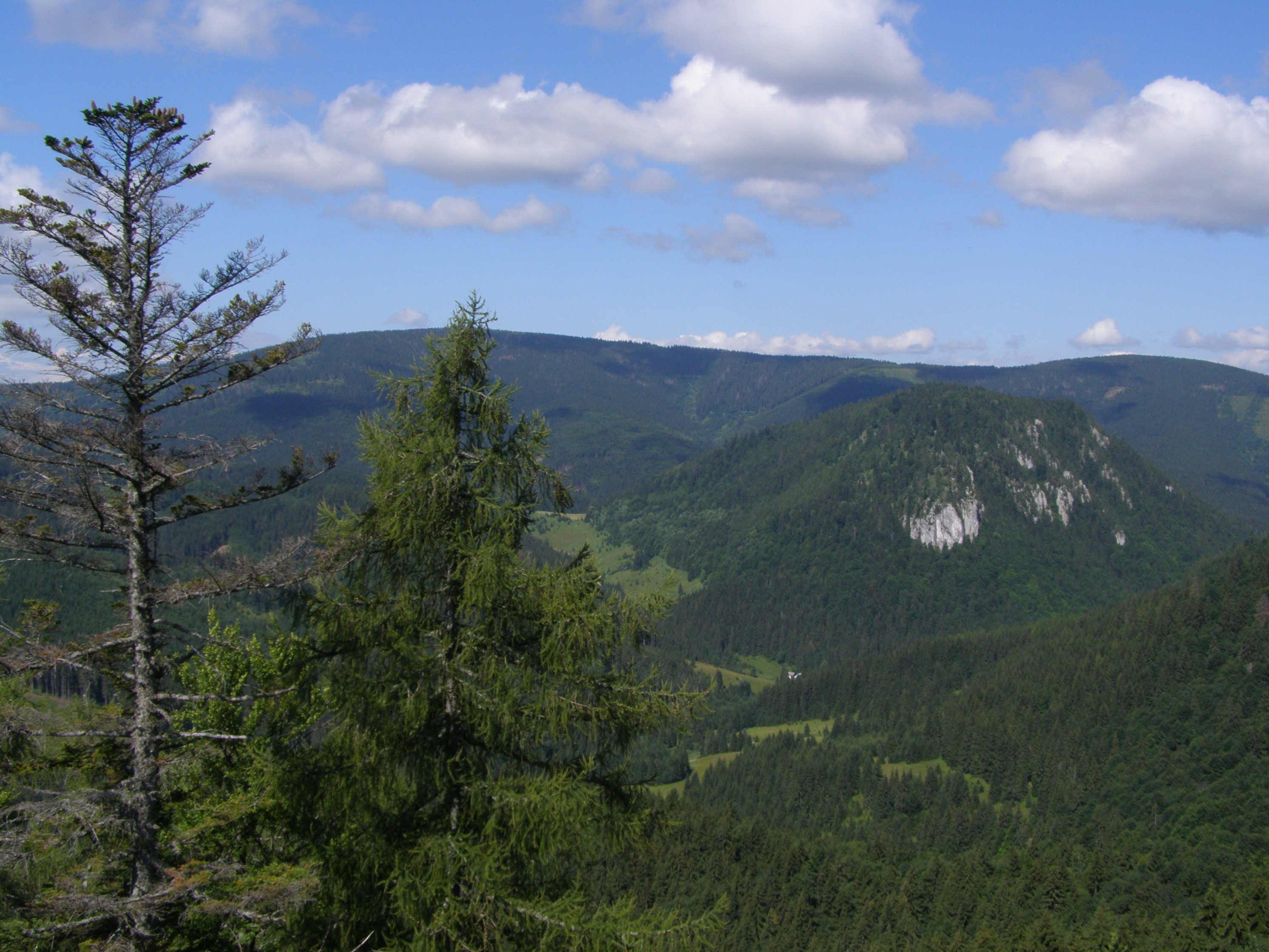
Muránska Planina National Park

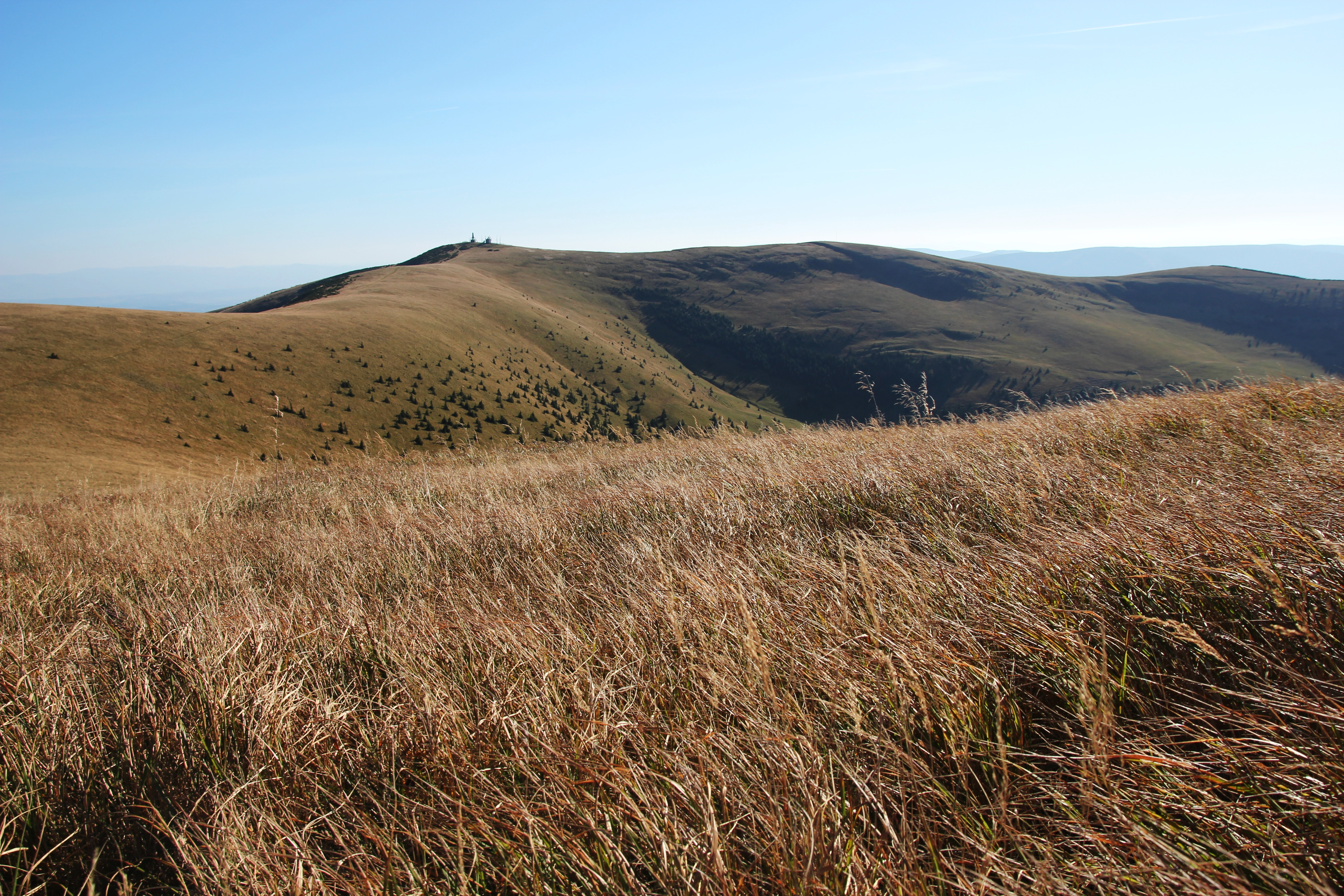
Greater Fatra National Park

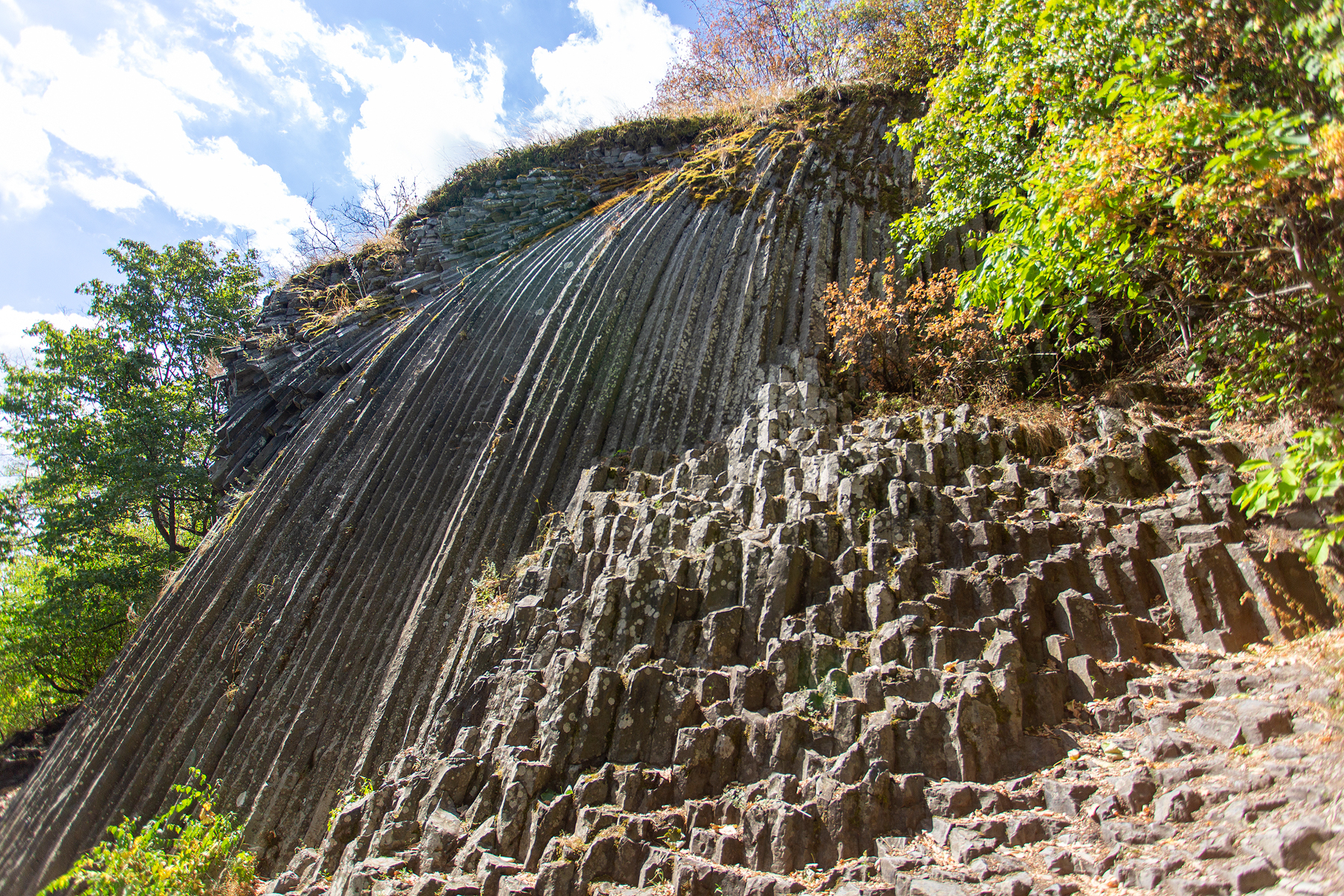
Cerová vrchovina Protected Landscape Area - Stone waterfall

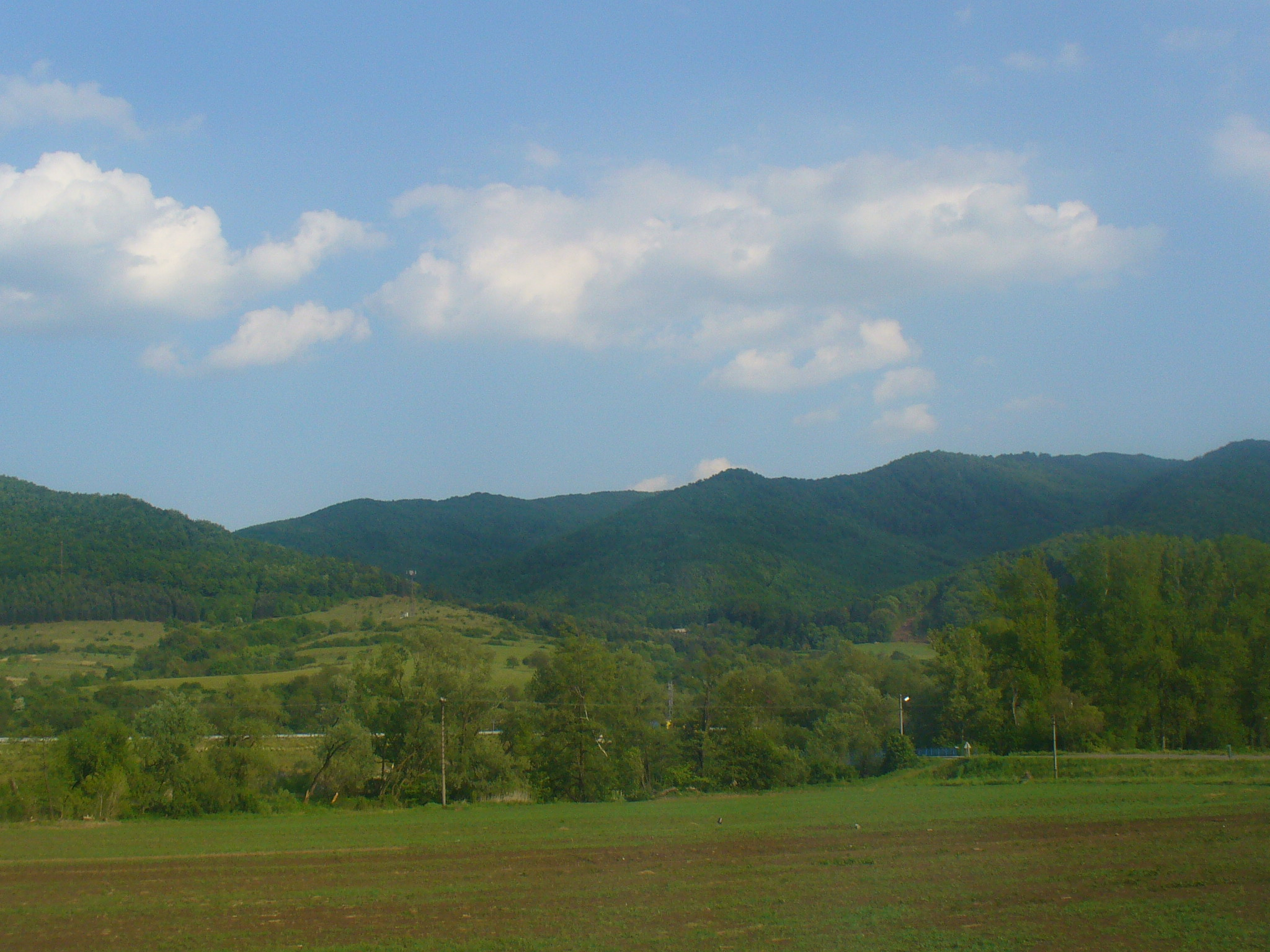
Štiavnické vrchy Protected Landscape Area

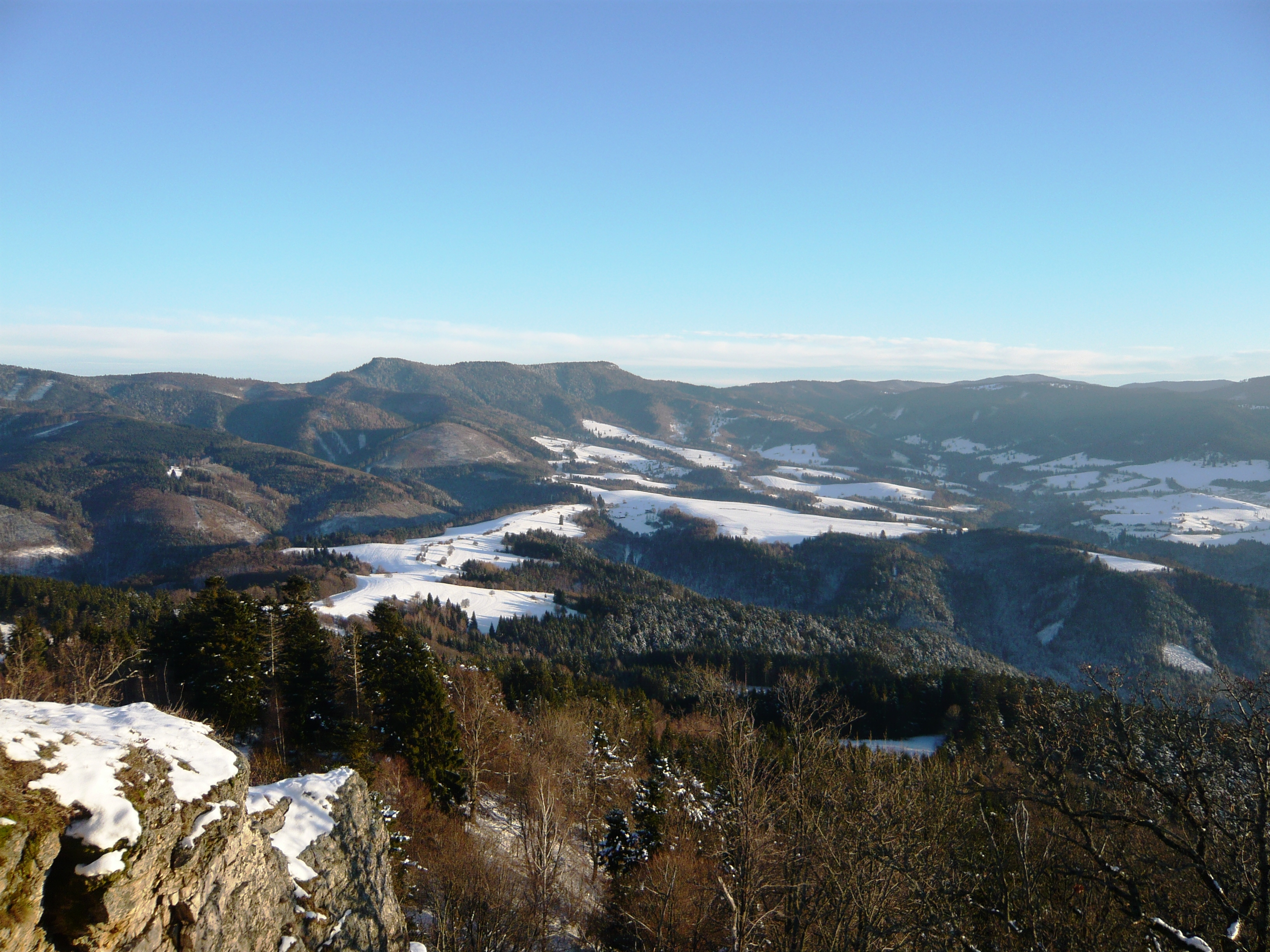
Poľana Protected Landscape Area

== See also ==
- Former Zólyom County of the Kingdom of Hungary
