= Detva =

- Municipality
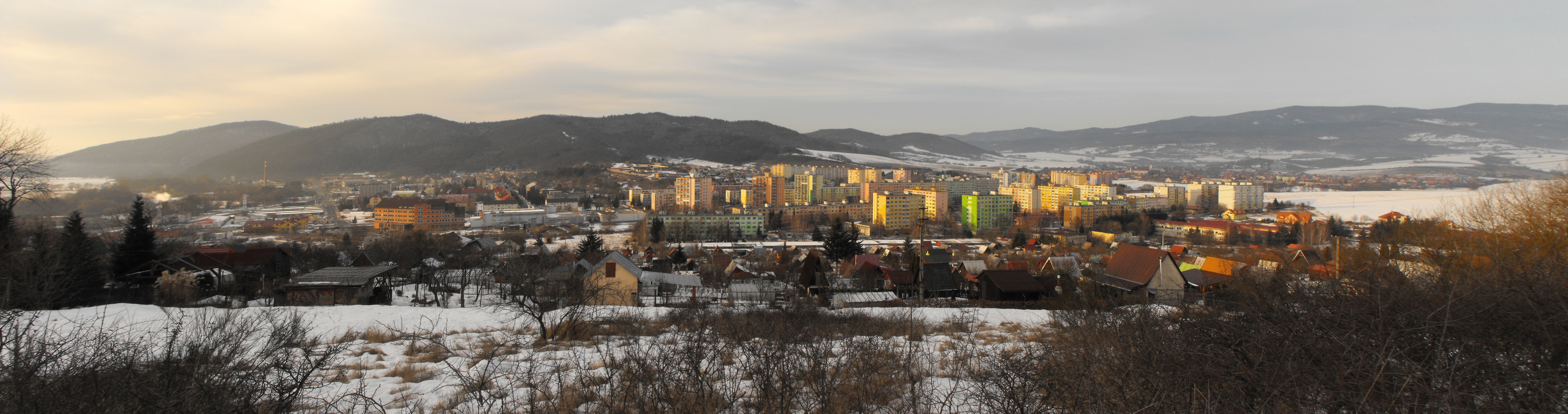
- Panorama of the city

- Flag Coat of arms

- Location of Detva in the Banská Bystrica Region Location of Detva in Slovakia
- Coordinates: 48.55°N 19.42°E
- Country: Slovakia
- Region: Banská Bystrica Region
- District: Detva District
- First mentioned: 1696

Government
  - Mayor: Branislav Baran

Area
  - Total: 68.08 km^{2} (26.29 sq mi)
- Elevation: 474 m (1,555 ft)

Population (2025)
  - Total: 13,416
- Time zone: UTC+1 (CET)
  - Summer (DST): UTC+2 (CEST)
- Postal code: 962 11
- Area code: +421 45
- Vehicle registration plate (until 2022): DT
- Website: www.detva.sk

Detva is a town in central Slovakia with a population of 14,686. It is situated beneath the mountain Poľana.

== Geography ==
The municipality lies at an altitude of 474 metres (1,555 ft) and covers an area of 68.08 km^{2} (26.29 sq mi) (2025).

== Etymology ==
The name means 'youth' in Slovak and was probably motivated by the majority of young people among the first settlers.

== History ==
Detva was created as a village of bondage in a deep-forested area belonging to Zvolenská Slatina and Očová upon instruction of the owner of the Vígľaš dominion Ladislav Čáky resp. Ladislaus Csáky in 1636-1638. The first settlers were coal producers from Ľubietová, followed by Walachian-type settlers from northern and eastern parts of Slovakia and immigrants from other surrounding villages. In 1787, Ján Vagač founded the first known manufactory producing bryndza cheese. The settlement became an oppidum (market town) in 1811 and a town in 1965. In 1996 the town of Detva became the seat of new Detva district.

It was developed as a large newly cleared land and this character has been preserved up to present, despite the fact that a part of the newly cleared lands were separated from Detva - Hriňová (before 1863), Detvianska Huta (in ?), Korytárky (in 1955; part of Kriváň until 1993) and Kriváň (in 1955). Logging and wood processing, sheep breeding and peasantry had been the main source of bread and butter of the Detvans. Hard living conditions at distant isolated newly cleared lands and self-sufficiency in providing of basic living needs determined the formation of the original material and spiritual culture of local inhabitants and thanks to this Detva had become one of the symbols of the modern Slovak nation.

In 1955 Detva experienced a significant change. A factory for military machinery and strategic constructions was built in the town's woods for security purposes. This factory, called Podpolianske strojárne Detva (PPS) at that time, produced UNC machinery, aka "Universal" on Western European markets. Machinery such as front loaders and skid steer loaders used to reach an annual production of 4,000. The factory enlarged the population of Detva from 3,500 to over 12,000, employing over 70% of Detva's population. However, after the Velvet Revolution and the split of Czechoslovakia, infamous illegal and non-transparent privatization, typical of then Central and Eastern European states, took place. Detva's PPS factory had to put its production on halt and to downsize its workforce from 8,000 in 1993 to 1,000 in 2005.

== Population ==
Population statistic (10 years)
Year	1995	2005	2015	2025
Count	15,347	15,020	14,887	13,416
Difference		−2.13%	−0.88%	−9.88%

Population statistic
Year	2024	2025
Count	13,523	13,416
Difference		−0.79%

It has a population of 13,416 people (31 December 2025).

=== Ethnicity ===
Census 2021 (1+ %)
Ethnicity	Number	Fraction
Slovak	13,086	93.77%
Not found out	724	5.18%
Romani	211	1.51%
Total	13,955	

In year 2021 was 13,955 people by ethnicity 13,086 as Slovak, 724 as Not found out, 211 as Romani, 86 as Czech, 39 as Hungarian, 17 as Ukrainian, 16 as Russian, 14 as Other, 12 as Vietnamese, 8 as Polish, 7 as German, 7 as Moravian, 7 as Croatian, 5 as Jewish, 5 as Italian, 5 as Rusyn, 3 as Irish, 3 as Bulgarian, 2 as Chinese, 2 as Serbian, 2 as English, 1 as Silesian, 1 as Romanian, 1 as Austrian and 1 as Albanian.

Note on population: The difference values of population numbers in the table "Population statistic" and in the sections "Ethnicity" & "Religion" is caused by the use of various statistical methods.

=== Religion ===
Census 2021 (1+ %)
Religion	Number	Fraction
Roman Catholic Church	9047	64.83%
None	2964	21.24%
Not found out	1133	8.12%
Evangelical Church	494	3.54%
Total	13,955	

In year 2021 was 13,955 people by religion 9047 from Roman Catholic Church, 2964 from None, 1133 from Not found out, 494 from Evangelical Church, 79 from Greek Catholic Church, 32 from Other, 28 from Christian Congregations in Slovakia, 27 from Jehovah's Witnesses, 24 from Eastern Orthodox Church, 21 from Other and not ascertained christian church, 21 from Ad hoc movements, 18 from Baptists Church, 16 from Calvinist Church, 12 from Islam, 10 from Buddhism, 7 from Old Catholic Church, 7 from Paganism and natural spirituality, 3 from Hinduism, 3 from United Methodist Church, 3 from Czechoslovak Hussite Church, 3 from Seventh-day Adventist Church, 1 from Jewish community, 1 from Church of Jesus Christ of Latter-day Saints and 1 from Apostolic Church.

According to the 2001 census, the town had 15,122 inhabitants. 96.11% of inhabitants were Slovaks, 1.75% Roma, and 0.75% Czechs. The religious make-up was 78.03% Roman Catholics, 13.11% people with no religious affiliation and 4.47% Lutherans.

== Neighborhoods ==
- Detva (proper)
- Detva - sídlisko
- Kostolná
- Krné
- Piešť I
- Piešť II
- Skliarovo
- Zapriechody

== Twin towns — sister cities ==
Detva is twinned with the town:

- Tuchów, Poland

== Gallery ==
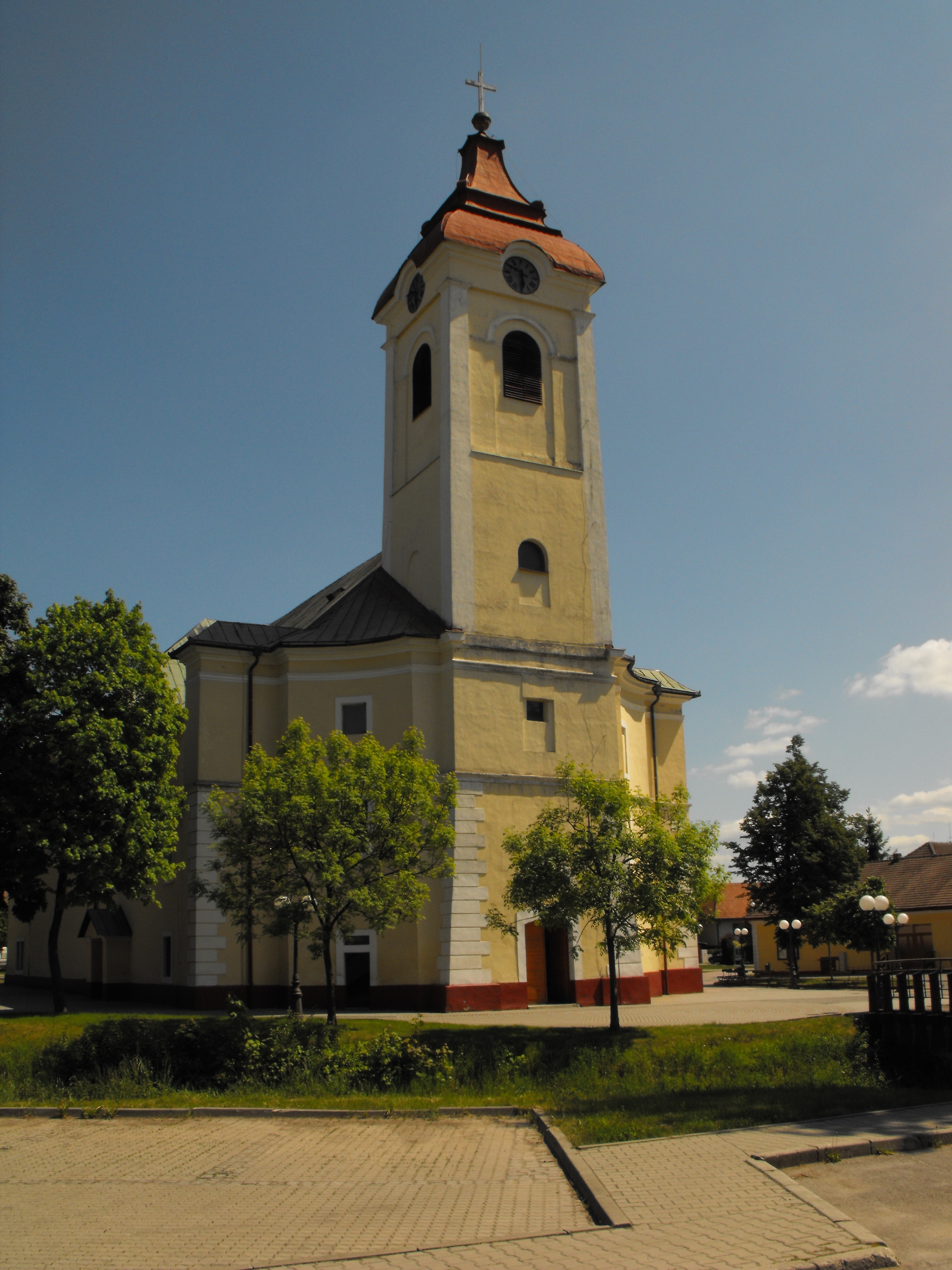
Church of Francis of Assisi

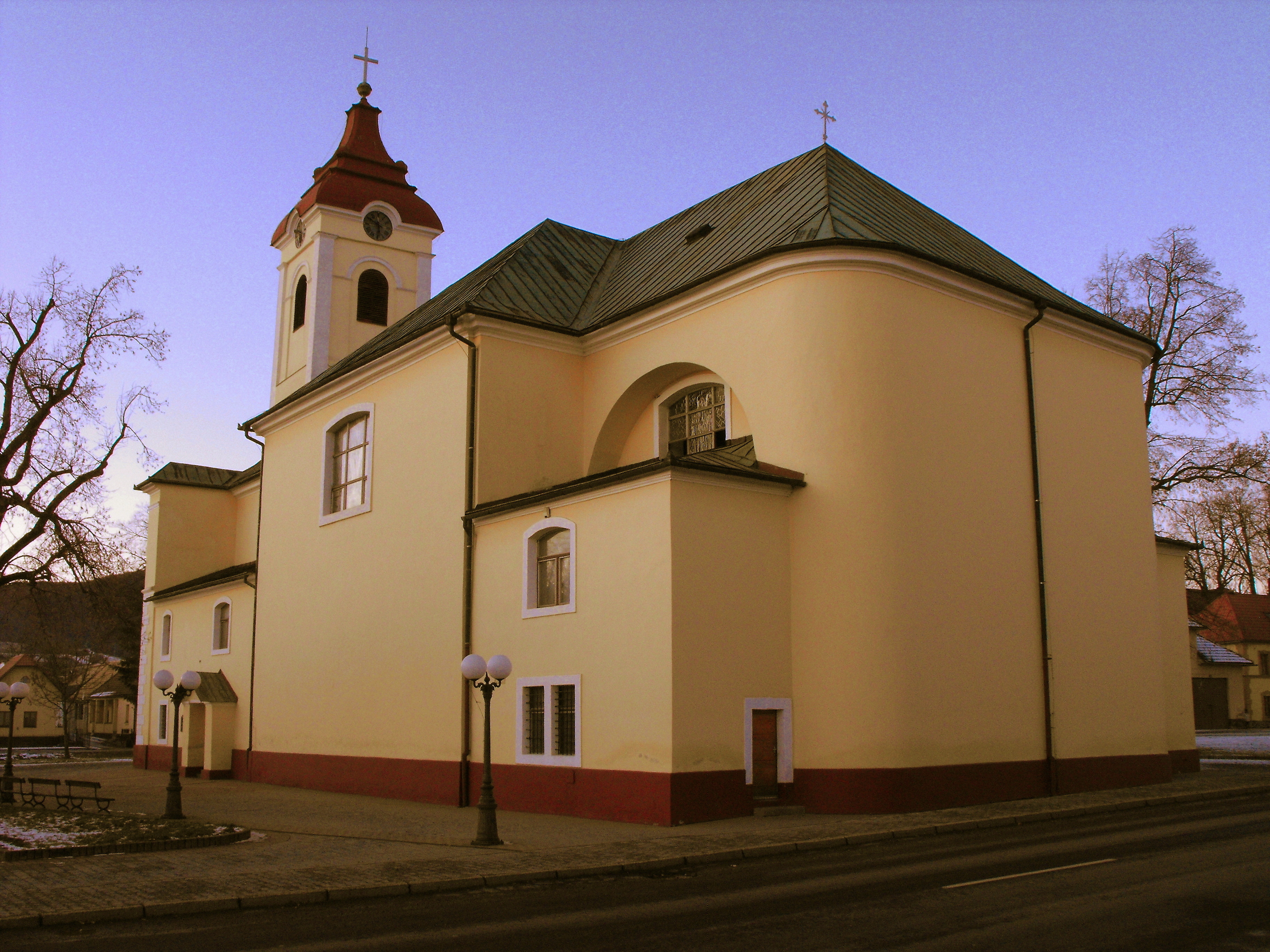
Church of Francis of Assisi

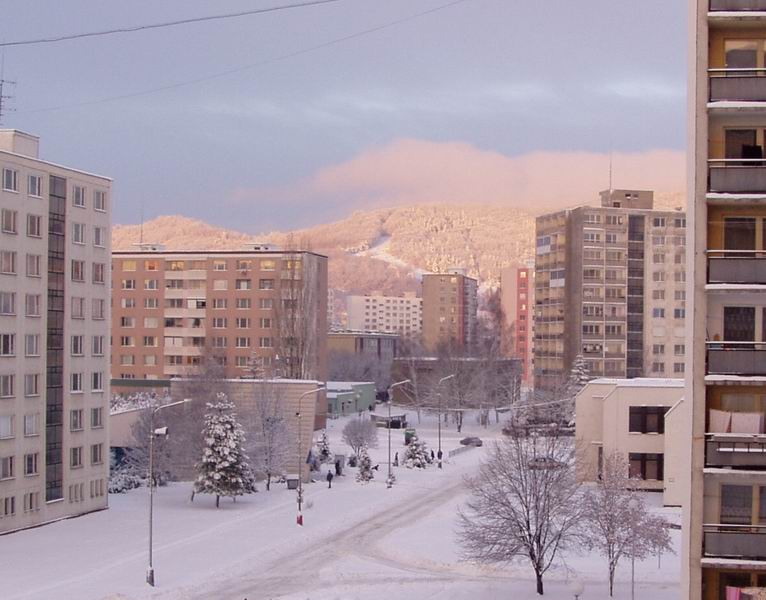
Detva in winter

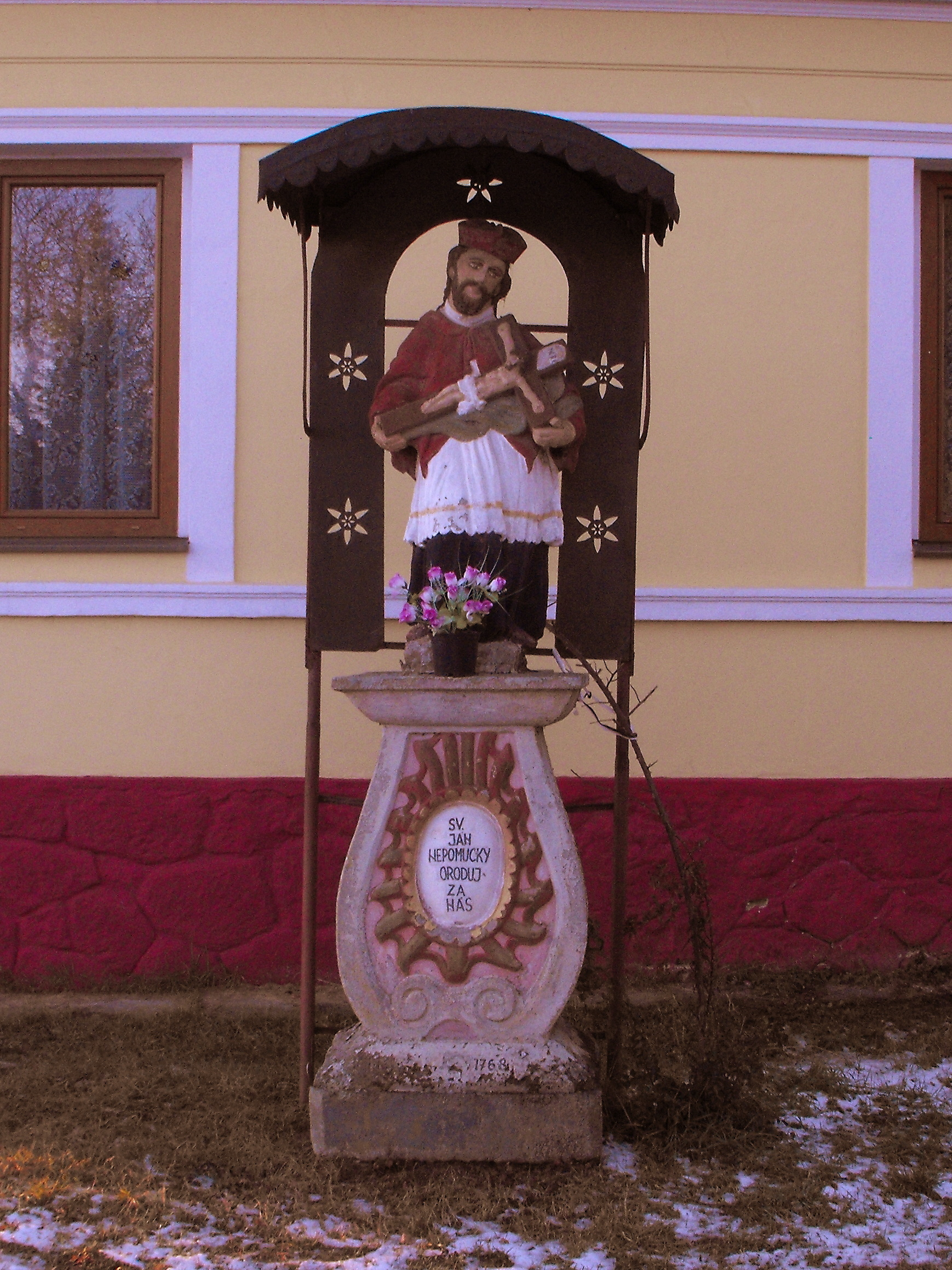
Statue of John of Nepomuk

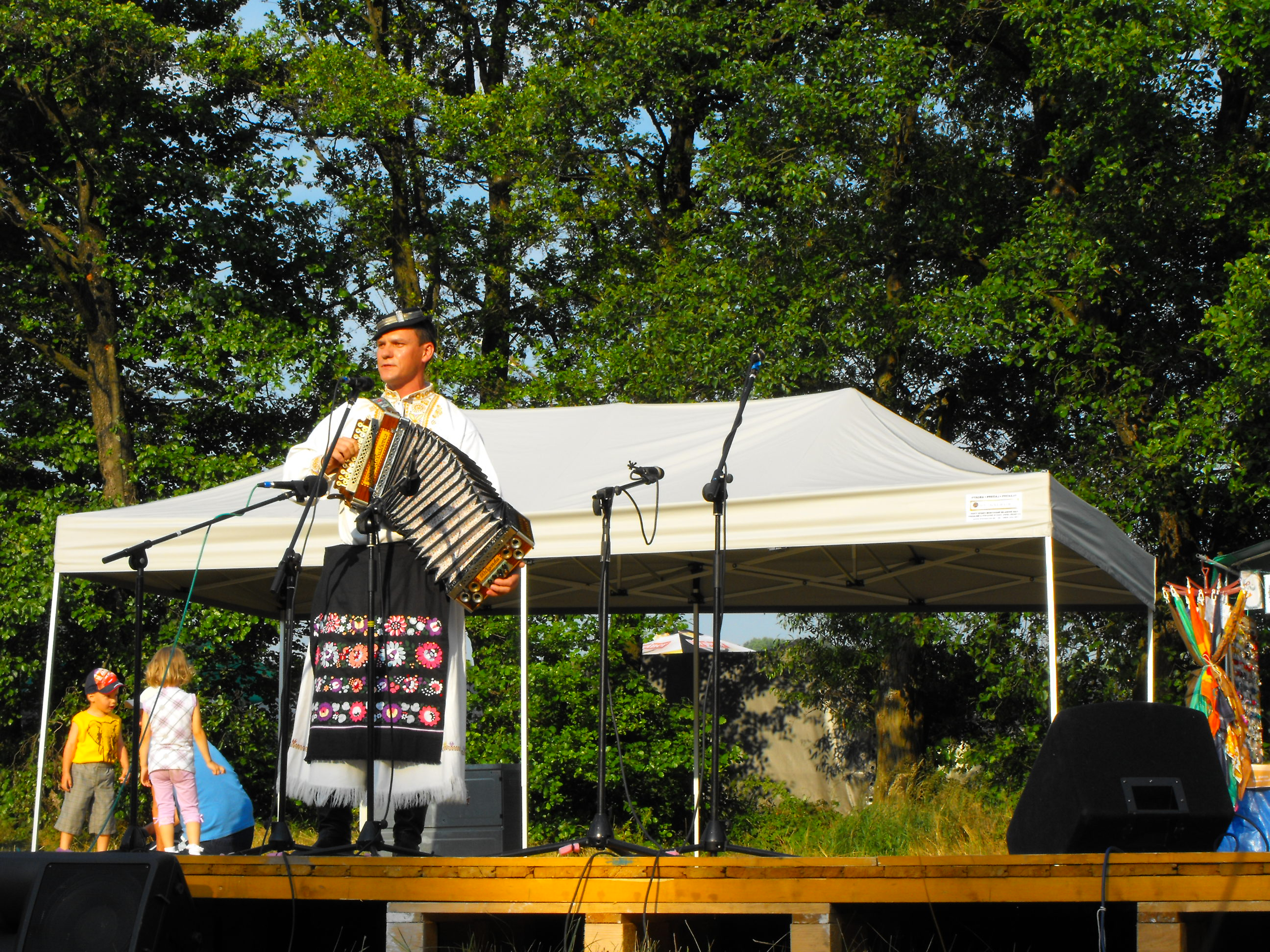
Accordionist during folklore festival

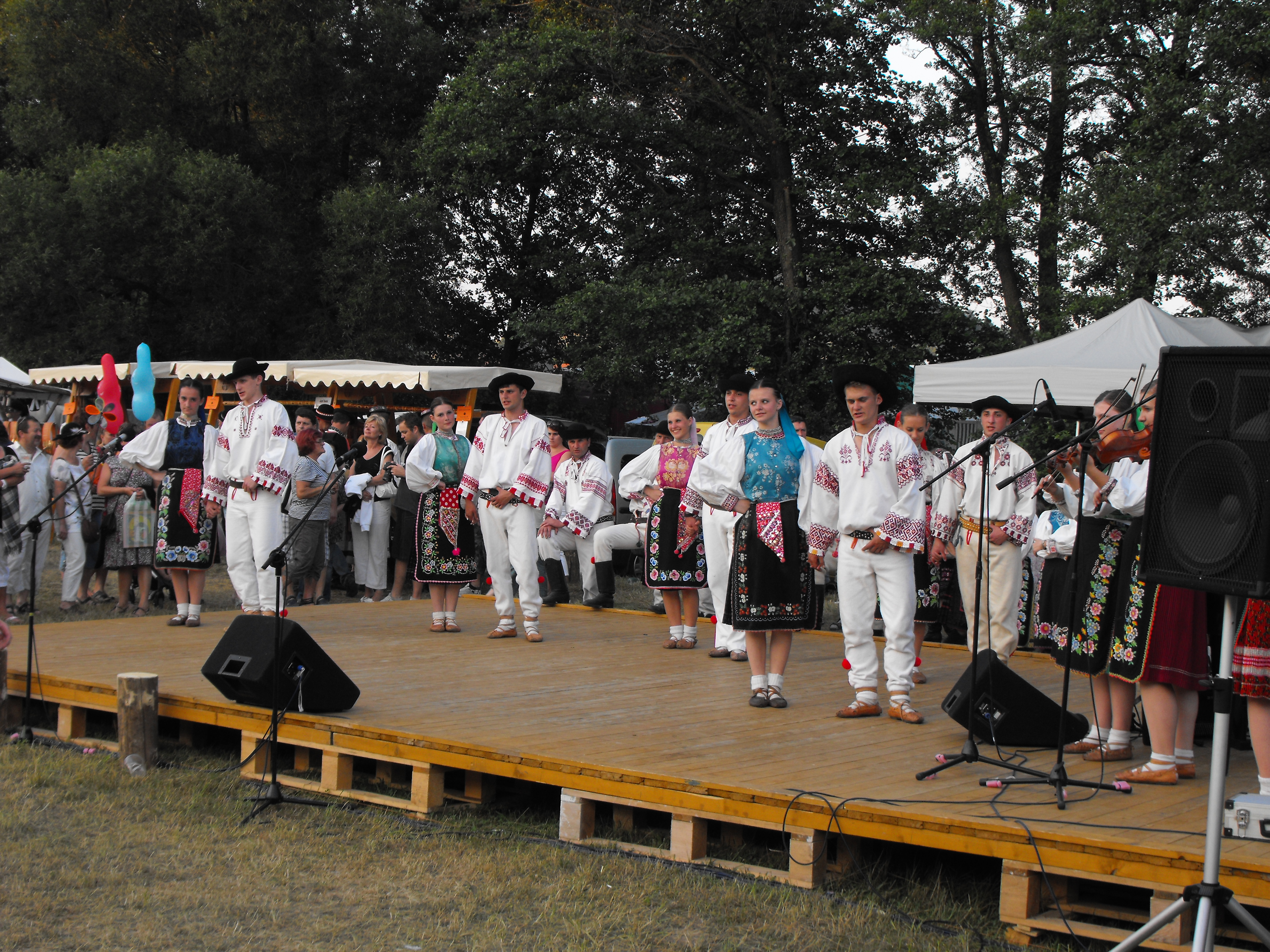
Folklore group during folklore festival

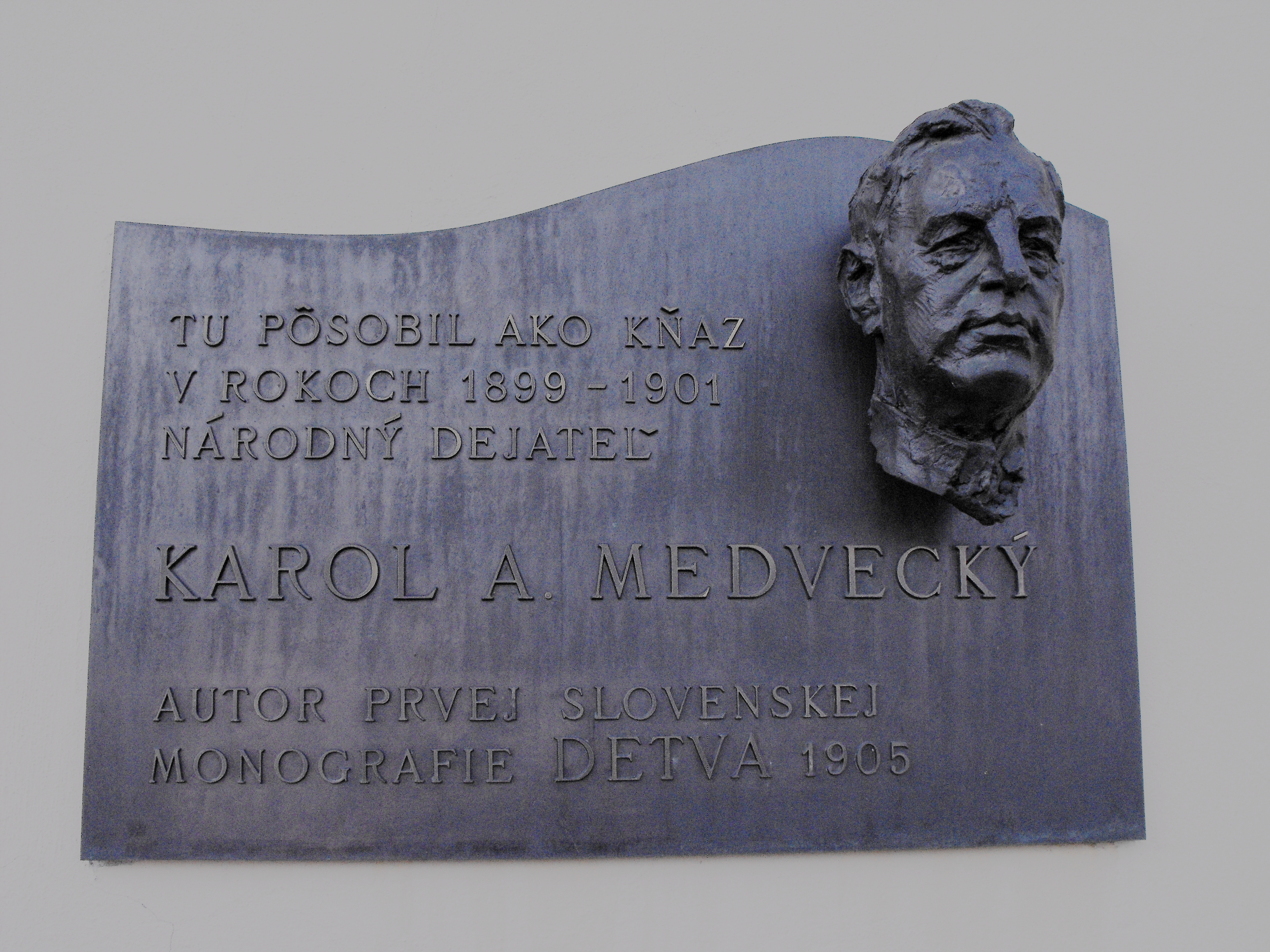
Memorial plaque of Karol Anton Medvecký

== See also ==
- List of municipalities and towns in Slovakia

== Genealogical resources ==
The records for genealogical research are available at the state archive "Statny Archiv in Banska Bystrica, Slovakia"

- Roman Catholic church records (births/marriages/deaths): 1662-1905 (parish A)
