= Poľana Protected Landscape Area =

Protected landscape area of Slovakia

Poľana Protected Landscape Area CHKO Poľana
- IUCN category V (protected landscape/seascape)
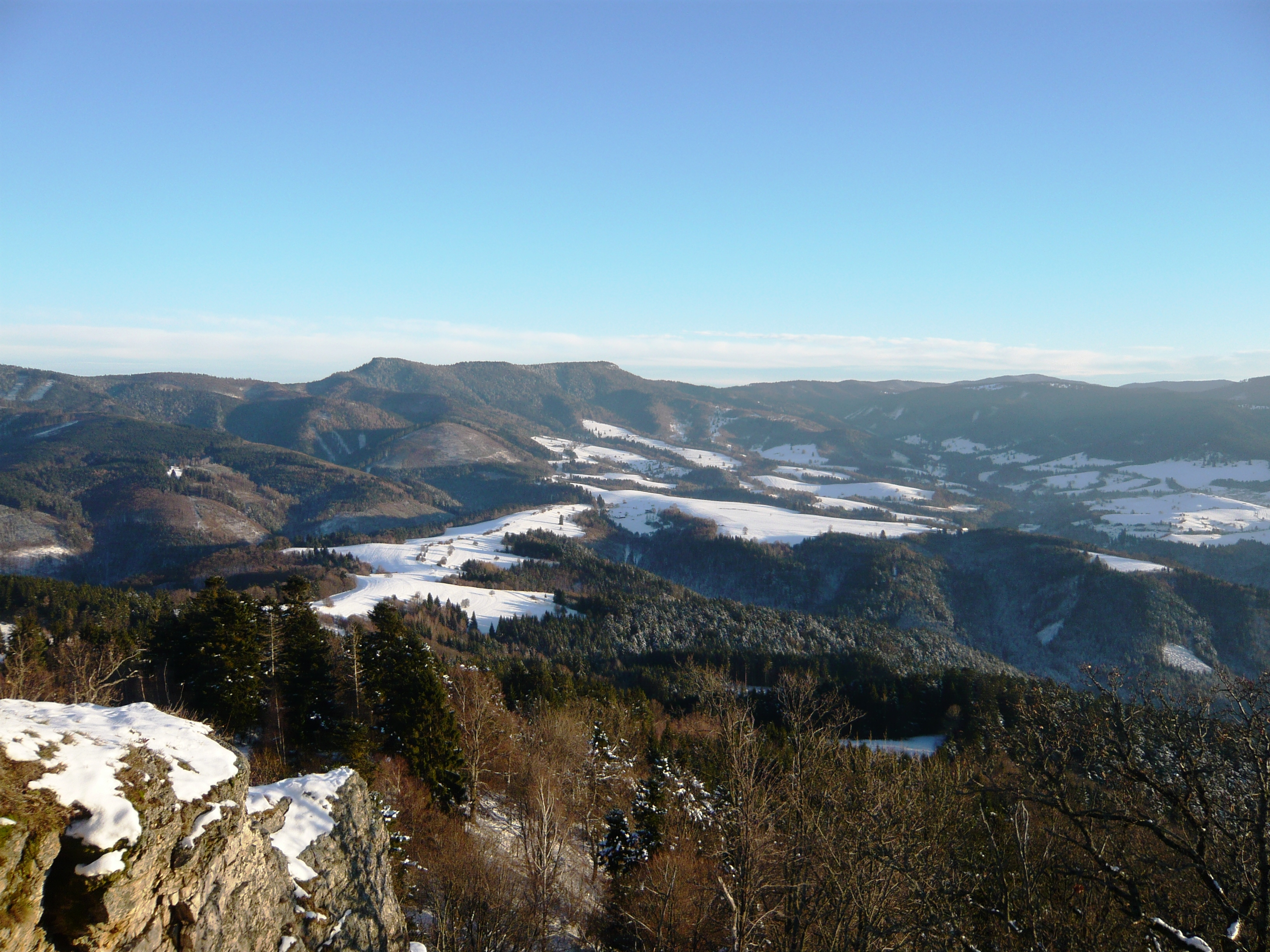
- Interactive map of Poľana Protected Landscape Area; CHKO Poľana
- Location: Central Slovakia: Poľana Mts.
- Coordinates: 48°37′N 19°28′E
- Area: 203.6 km^{2} (78.6 mi^{2})
- Established: 12 August 1981
- Governing body: Správa CHKO Poľana (Poľana PLA administration) in Zvolen

Poľana Mountains Protected Landscape Area (Slovak: Chránená krajinná oblasť Poľana) is one of the 14 protected landscape areas in Slovakia. The Landscape Area is situated in the Poľana Mountains, part of the Slovenské stredohorie Mountains, in Central Slovakia. It is situated in the Banská Bystrica, Brezno, Detva, and Zvolen districts.

Poľana was declared a UNESCO biosphere reserve on 27 March 1990. A permanent research site was established in 1991 as part of the European Long-Term Ecosystem Research (eLTER) program.

== History ==
The Protected Landscape Area was established on 12 August 1981, and the law was amended on 3 September 2004. Protected areas declared before include the national nature reserves of Badínsky prales Old Growth Forest (1913), Zadná Poľana (1953) and Boky (1964), and the nature monuments of Bátovský balvan Rock (1964) and Kalamárka (1977).

== Geography ==
The highest mountains are Poľana at 1,457.8 m (4,783 ft) and Predná Poľana at 1,367 m (4,485 ft).
