= Klokoč =

Klokoč may refer to:

- Klokoč, Croatia
- Klokoč, Slovakia
