= Vígľašská Huta-Kalinka =

Vígľašská Huta-Kalinka Végleshutakálnok
- Municipality
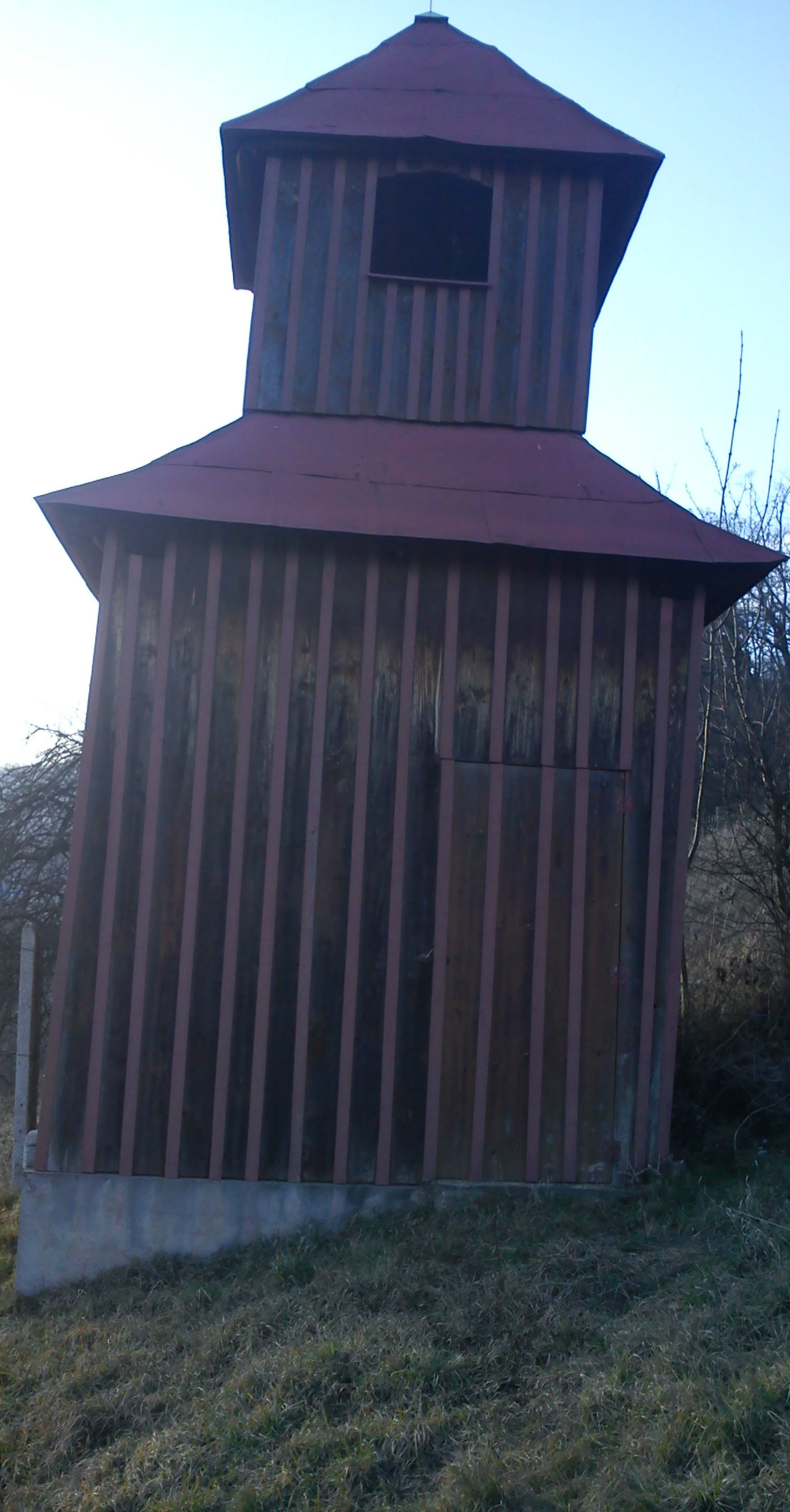

- Flag

- Location of Vígľašská Huta-Kalinka in the Banská Bystrica Region Location of Vígľašská Huta-Kalinka in Slovakia
- Coordinates: 48.48°N 19.27°E
- Country: Slovakia
- Region: Banská Bystrica Region
- District: Detva District
- First mentioned: 1773

Area
  - Total: 16.19 km^{2} (6.25 sq mi)
- Elevation: 559 m (1,834 ft)

Population (2025)
  - Total: 338
- Time zone: UTC+1 (CET)
  - Summer (DST): UTC+2 (CEST)
- Postal code: 962 26
- Area code: +421 45
- Vehicle registration plate (until 2022): DT
- Website: www.vhkalinka.eu

Vígľašská Huta-Kalinka (Hungarian: Végleshutakálnok) is a village and municipality in Detva District, in the Banská Bystrica Region of central Slovakia.

== Geography ==
The municipality lies at an altitude of 559 metres (1,834 ft) and covers an area of 16.19 km^{2} (6.25 sq mi) (2025).

== Population ==
Population statistic (10 years)
Year	1995	2005	2015	2025
Count	383	383	347	338
Difference		+0%	−9.39%	−2.59%

Population statistic
Year	2024	2025
Count	339	338
Difference		−0.29%

It has a population of 338 people (31 December 2025).

=== Ethnicity ===
Census 2021 (1+ %)
Ethnicity	Number	Fraction
Slovak	307	95.93%
Czech	8	2.5%
Not found out	7	2.18%
Total	320	

In year 2021 was 320 people by ethnicity 307 as Slovak, 8 as Czech, 7 as Not found out, 3 as Polish and 2 as Romani.

Note on population: The difference values of population numbers in the table "Population statistic" and in the sections "Ethnicity" & "Religion" is caused by the use of various statistical methods.

=== Religion ===
Census 2021 (1+ %)
Religion	Number	Fraction
Roman Catholic Church	210	65.63%
None	61	19.06%
Evangelical Church	35	10.94%
Not found out	7	2.19%
Total	320	

In year 2021 was 320 people by religion 210 from Roman Catholic Church, 61 from None, 35 from Evangelical Church, 7 from Not found out, 3 from Buddhism, 2 from Eastern Orthodox Church, 1 from Other and 1 from Greek Catholic Church.
