= Poľana =

Mountain range in Slovakia

Coordinates: 48.633°N 19.467°E

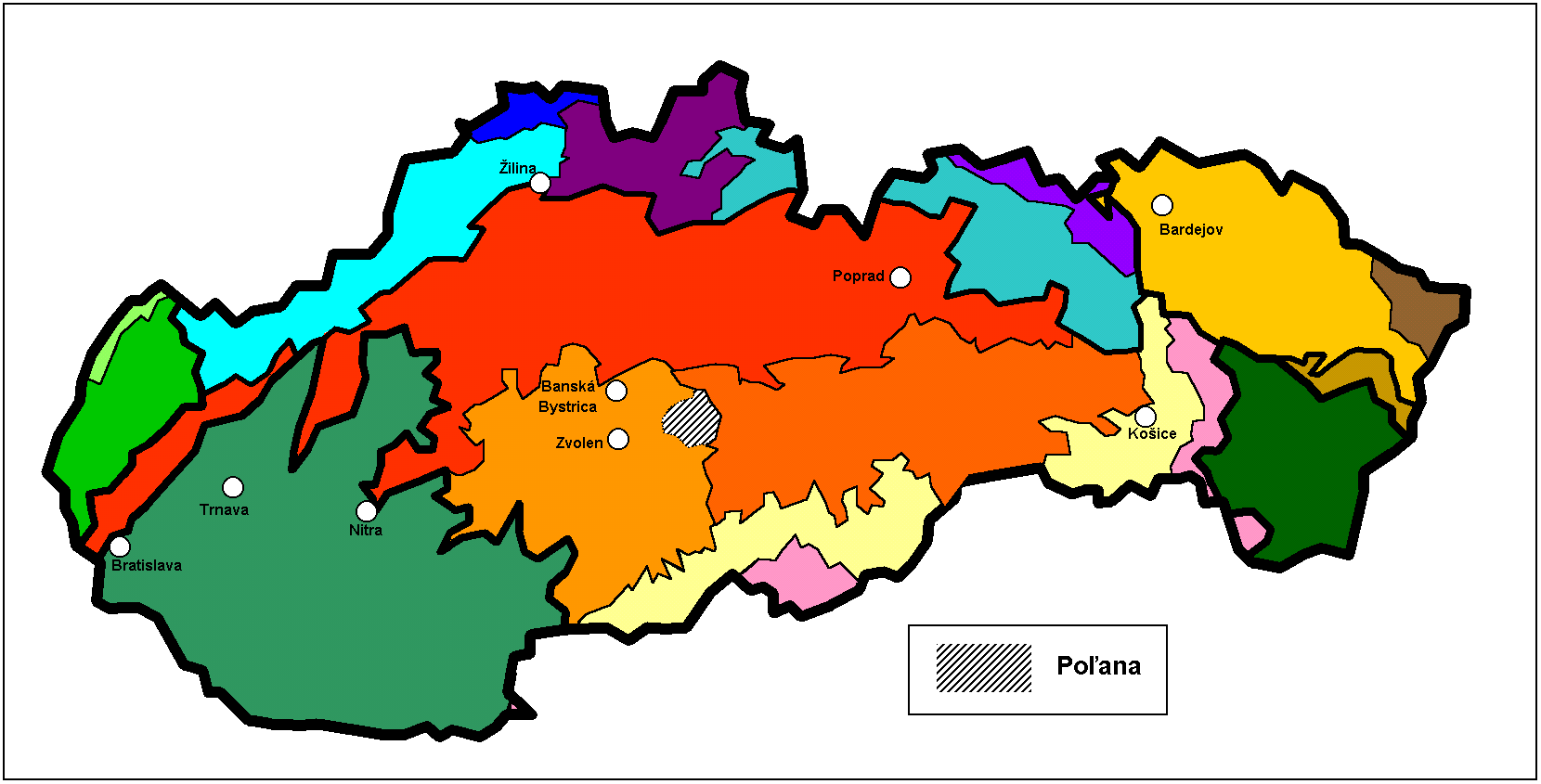
Poľana within the Geomorphological division of Slovakia

Poľana is a small mountain range in central Slovakia. It lies in the north-eastern part of the Slovak Central Mountains within the Western Carpathians Mountains. The highest hill is Poľana - an inactive stratovolcano - at 1,458 m (4,873 ft) ASL.

The mountain range is bordered by Slovak Ore Mountains in the east, more precisely its subdivision the Vepor Mountains, and by the Zvolen Basin in the south and west.

Since 12 August 1981 the area has been protected as part of the Poľana Protected Landscape Area. Municipalities nearby include Hrochoť, Očová, Detva, Hriňová and Ľubietová.
