= Milan Kolibiar =

Slovak mathematician

Milan Kolibiar (born 14 February 1922 in Detvianska Huta, died 9 July 1994 in Bratislava) was a Slovak mathematician.

He worked mostly in lattice theory and universal algebra.
