= Horný Tisovník =

Village and municipality in Slovakia

Horný Tisovník Felsőtisztás
- Municipality
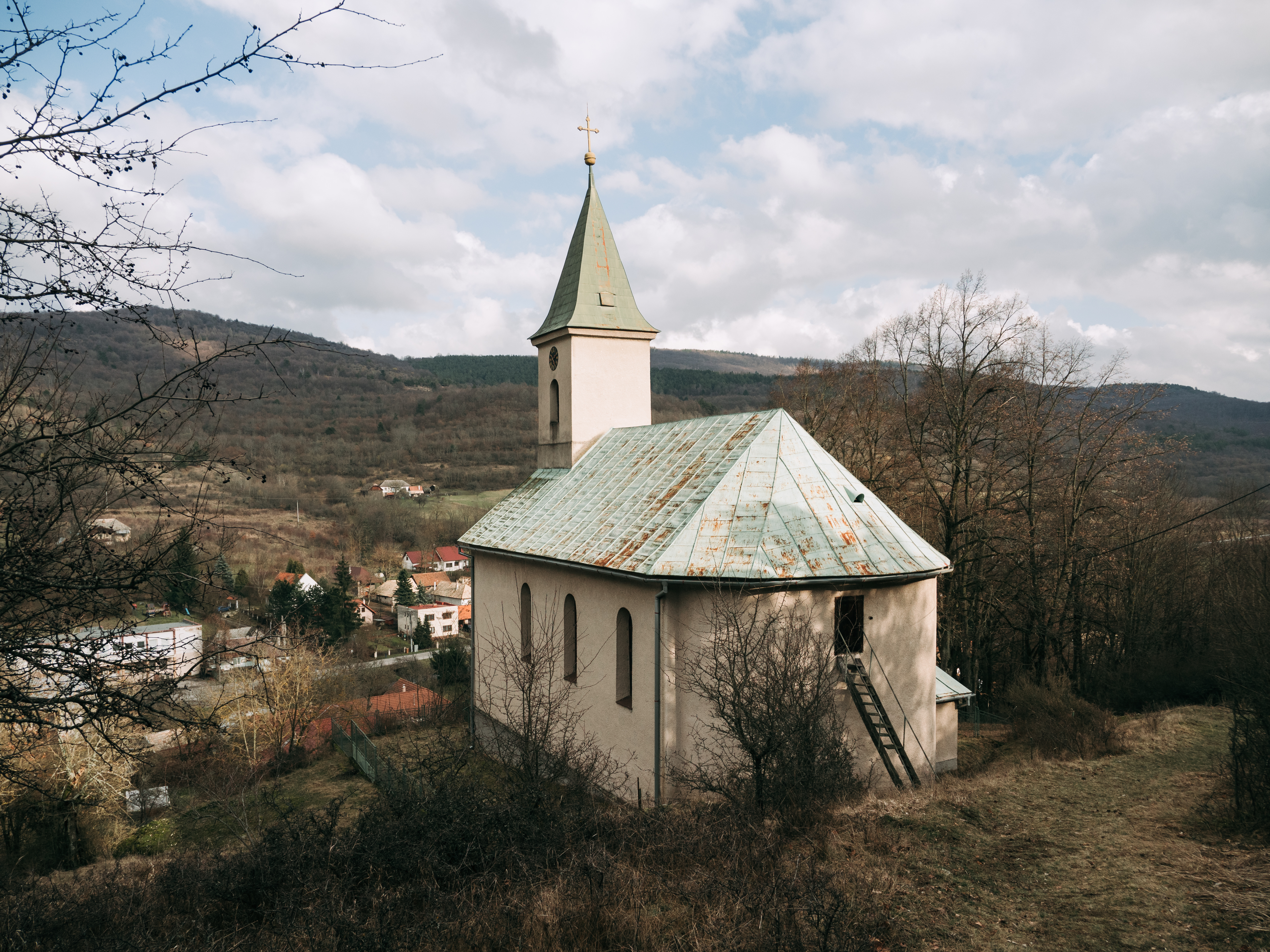
- Lutheran Church in Horný Tisovník

- Flag

- Location of Horný Tisovník in the Banská Bystrica Region Location of Horný Tisovník in Slovakia
- Coordinates: 48.42°N 19.37°E
- Country: Slovakia
- Region: Banská Bystrica Region
- District: Detva District
- First mentioned: 1573

Area
  - Total: 32.16 km^{2} (12.42 sq mi)
- Elevation: 388 m (1,273 ft)

Population (2025)
  - Total: 191
- Time zone: UTC+1 (CET)
  - Summer (DST): UTC+2 (CEST)
- Postal code: 962 75
- Area code: +421 45
- Vehicle registration plate (until 2022): DT
- Website: www.hornytisovnik.eu

Horný Tisovník (Hungarian: Felsőtisztás) is a village and municipality in Detva District, in the Banská Bystrica Region of central Slovakia.

== Geography ==
The municipality lies at an altitude of 388 metres (1,273 ft) and covers an area of 32.16 km^{2} (12.42 sq mi) (2025).

== Population ==
Population statistic (10 years)
Year	1995	2005	2015	2025
Count	320	232	195	191
Difference		−27.5%	−15.94%	−2.05%

Population statistic
Year	2024	2025
Count	189	191
Difference		+1.05%

It has a population of 191 people (31 December 2025).

=== Ethnicity ===
Census 2021 (1+ %)
Ethnicity	Number	Fraction
Slovak	165	97.05%
Not found out	2	1.17%
Total	170	

In year 2021 was 170 people by ethnicity 165 as Slovak, 2 as Not found out, 1 as Czech, 1 as Ukrainian, 1 as Russian and 1 as Polish.

Note on population: The difference values of population numbers in the table "Population statistic" and in the sections "Ethnicity" & "Religion" is caused by the use of various statistical methods.

=== Religion ===
Census 2021 (1+ %)
Religion	Number	Fraction
Evangelical Church	83	48.82%
Roman Catholic Church	47	27.65%
None	37	21.76%
Not found out	2	1.18%
Total	170	

In year 2021 was 170 people by religion 83 from Evangelical Church, 47 from Roman Catholic Church, 37 from None, 2 from Not found out and 1 from Eastern Orthodox Church.

== Genealogical resources ==
The records for genealogical research are available at the state archive "Statny Archiv in Banska Bystrica, Slovakia"

- Roman Catholic church records (births/marriages/deaths): 1755-1898 (parish A)
- Lutheran church records (births/marriages/deaths): 1727-1895 (parish B)

== See also ==
- List of municipalities and towns in Slovakia
