= Stará Huta =

Stará Huta Divényhuta
- Municipality
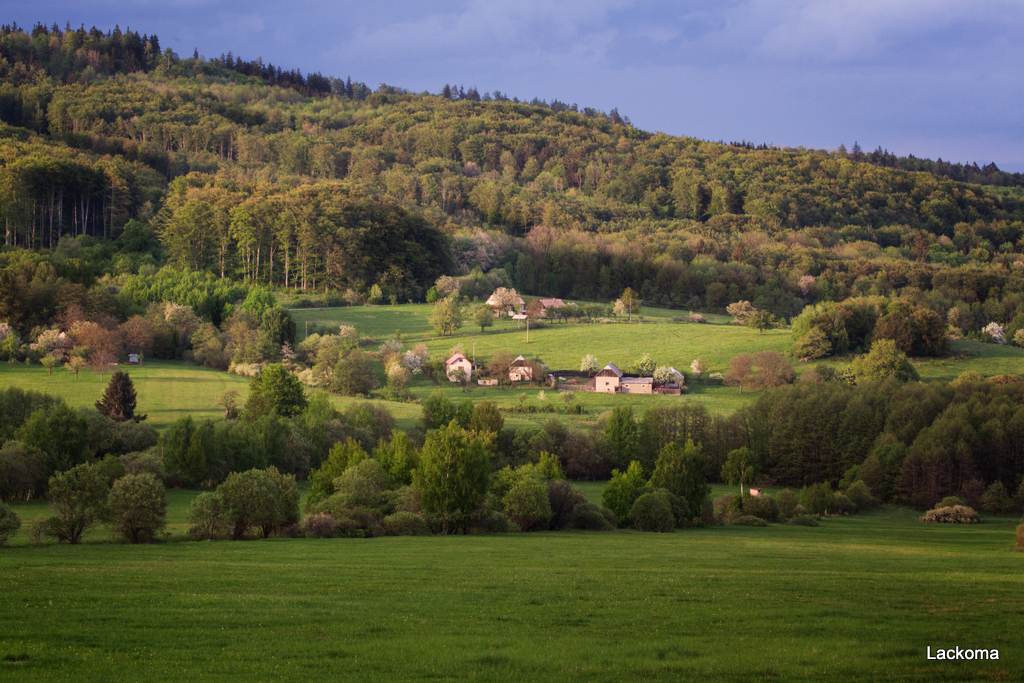

- Flag

- Location of Stará Huta in the Banská Bystrica Region Location of Stará Huta in Slovakia
- Coordinates: 48.47°N 19.34°E
- Country: Slovakia
- Region: Banská Bystrica Region
- District: Detva District
- First mentioned: 1350

Area
  - Total: 24.57 km^{2} (9.49 sq mi)
- Elevation: 772 m (2,533 ft)

Population (2025)
  - Total: 302
- Time zone: UTC+1 (CET)
  - Summer (DST): UTC+2 (CEST)
- Postal code: 962 25
- Area code: +421 45
- Vehicle registration plate (until 2022): DT
- Website: www.obecstarahuta.sk

Stará Huta (Hungarian: Divényhuta) is a village and municipality in Detva District, in the Banská Bystrica Region of central Slovakia.

== Geography ==
The municipality lies at an altitude of 772 metres (2,533 ft) and covers an area of 24.57 km^{2} (9.49 sq mi) (2025).

== Population ==
Population statistic (10 years)
Year	1995	2005	2015	2025
Count	418	379	341	302
Difference		−9.33%	−10.02%	−11.43%

Population statistic
Year	2024	2025
Count	302	302
Difference		+0%

It has a population of 302 people (31 December 2025).

=== Ethnicity ===
Census 2021 (1+ %)
Ethnicity	Number	Fraction
Slovak	306	95.03%
Not found out	13	4.03%
Total	322	

In year 2021 was 322 people by ethnicity 306 as Slovak, 13 as Not found out, 2 as Czech, 1 as Jewish and 1 as Other.

Note on population: The difference values of population numbers in the table "Population statistic" and in the sections "Ethnicity" & "Religion" is caused by the use of various statistical methods.

=== Religion ===
Census 2021 (1+ %)
Religion	Number	Fraction
Roman Catholic Church	243	75.47%
None	42	13.04%
Not found out	14	4.35%
Evangelical Church	13	4.04%
Ad hoc movements	4	1.24%
Total	322	

In year 2021 was 322 people by religion 243 from Roman Catholic Church, 42 from None, 14 from Not found out, 13 from Evangelical Church, 4 from Ad hoc movements, 2 from Jehovah's Witnesses, 2 from Greek Catholic Church, 1 from Paganism and natural spirituality and 1 from Other.
