= Stožok =

Stožok Dombszög
- Municipality
- Flag

- Location of Stožok in the Banská Bystrica Region Location of Stožok in Slovakia
- Coordinates: 48.50°N 19.35°E
- Country: Slovakia
- Region: Banská Bystrica Region
- District: Detva District
- First mentioned: 1773

Area
  - Total: 8.94 km^{2} (3.45 sq mi)
- Elevation: 377 m (1,237 ft)

Population (2025)
  - Total: 1,195
- Time zone: UTC+1 (CET)
  - Summer (DST): UTC+2 (CEST)
- Postal code: 962 12
- Area code: +421 45
- Vehicle registration plate (until 2022): DT
- Website: www.stozok.sk

Stožok (Hungarian: Dombszög) is a village and municipality in Detva District, in the Banská Bystrica Region of central Slovakia.

== Geography ==
The municipality lies at an altitude of 377 metres (1,237 ft) and covers an area of 8.94 km^{2} (3.45 sq mi) (2025).

== Population ==
Population statistic (10 years)
| Year | 1995 | 2005 | 2015 | 2025 |
|---|---|---|---|---|
| Count | 710 | 703 | 1000 | 1195 |
| Difference | | −0.98% | +42.24% | +19.5% |

Population statistic
| Year | 2024 | 2025 |
|---|---|---|
| Count | 1195 | 1195 |
| Difference | | +0% |

It has a population of 1195 people (31 December 2025).

=== Ethnicity ===
Census 2021 (1+ %)
| Ethnicity | Number | Fraction |
|---|---|---|
| Slovak | 1042 | 97.02% |
| Not found out | 29 | 2.7% |
| Total | 1074 | |

In year 2021 was 1074 people by ethnicity 1042 as Slovak, 29 as Not found out, 10 as Other, 5 as Czech, 3 as Polish, 2 as Russian, 1 as Romani, 1 as Rusyn and 1 as Hungarian.

Note on population: The difference values of population numbers in the table "Population statistic" and in the sections "Ethnicity" & "Religion" is caused by the use of various statistical methods.

=== Religion ===
Census 2021 (1+ %)
| Religion | Number | Fraction |
|---|---|---|
| Roman Catholic Church | 784 | 73% |
| None | 204 | 18.99% |
| Evangelical Church | 27 | 2.51% |
| Not found out | 26 | 2.42% |
| Total | 1074 | |

In year 2021 was 1074 people by religion 784 from Roman Catholic Church, 204 from None, 27 from Evangelical Church, 26 from Not found out, 8 from Greek Catholic Church, 6 from Ad hoc movements, 5 from Other and not ascertained christian church, 3 from Paganism and natural spirituality, 3 from Islam, 2 from Other, 1 from Eastern Orthodox Church, 1 from Jehovah's Witnesses, 1 from Christian Congregations in Slovakia, 1 from Hinduism, 1 from Buddhism and 1 from Apostolic Church.
