= Látky =

- Municipality
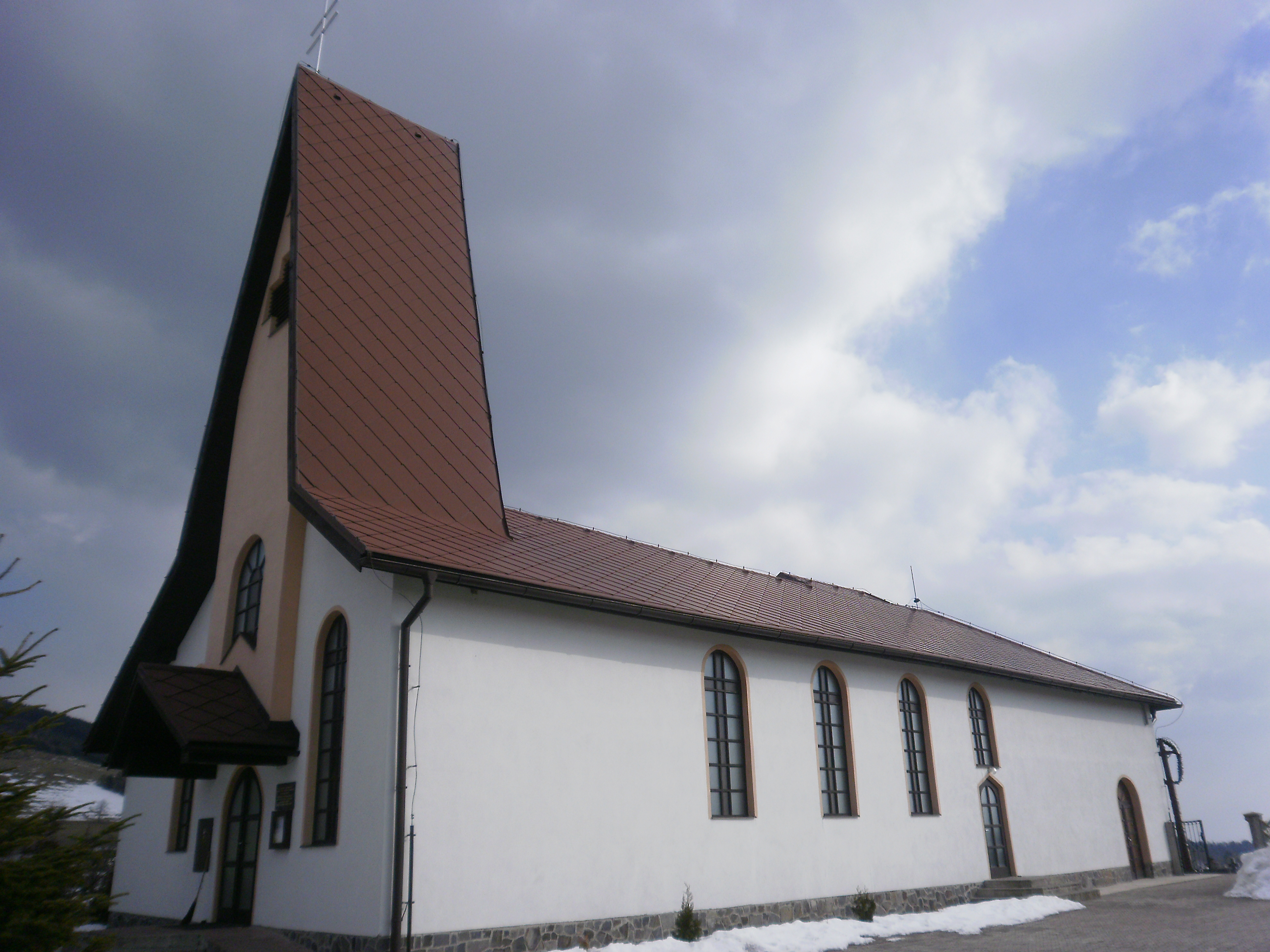
- Church in Látky

- Flag

- Location of Látky in the Banská Bystrica Region Location of Látky in Slovakia
- Coordinates: 48.57°N 19.63°E
- Country: Slovakia
- Region: Banská Bystrica Region
- District: Detva District
- First mentioned: 1730

Area
  - Total: 45.73 km^{2} (17.66 sq mi)
- Elevation: 880 m (2,890 ft)

Population (2025)
  - Total: 537
- Time zone: UTC+1 (CET)
  - Summer (DST): UTC+2 (CEST)
- Postal code: 985 45
- Area code: +421 45
- Vehicle registration plate (until 2022): DT
- Website: www.obeclatky.sk

Látky is a village and municipality in Detva District, in the Banská Bystrica Region of central Slovakia.

== Geography ==
The municipality lies at an altitude of 880 metres (2,890 ft) and covers an area of 45.73 km^{2} (17.66 sq mi) (2025).

== Population ==
Population statistic (10 years)
Year	1995	2005	2015	2025
Count	708	564	561	537
Difference		−20.33%	−0.53%	−4.27%

Population statistic
Year	2024	2025
Count	537	537
Difference		+0%

It has a population of 537 people (31 December 2025).

=== Ethnicity ===
Census 2021 (1+ %)
Ethnicity	Number	Fraction
Slovak	557	98.75%
Other	10	1.77%
Not found out	6	1.06%
Total	564	

In year 2021 was 564 people by ethnicity 557 as Slovak, 10 as Other, 6 as Not found out, 2 as German, 2 as Hungarian, 1 as Jewish, 1 as Vietnamese, 1 as Silesian and 1 as Albanian.

Note on population: The difference values of population numbers in the table "Population statistic" and in the sections "Ethnicity" & "Religion" is caused by the use of various statistical methods.

=== Religion ===
Census 2021 (1+ %)
Religion	Number	Fraction
Roman Catholic Church	458	81.21%
None	78	13.83%
Not found out	12	2.13%
Other and not ascertained christian church	7	1.24%
Total	564	

In year 2021 was 564 people by religion 458 from Roman Catholic Church, 78 from None, 12 from Not found out, 7 from Other and not ascertained christian church, 3 from Evangelical Church, 2 from Christian Congregations in Slovakia, 2 from Other, 1 from Paganism and natural spirituality and 1 from Czechoslovak Hussite Church.
