= Hriňová =

Hriňová Herencsvölgy
- Municipality
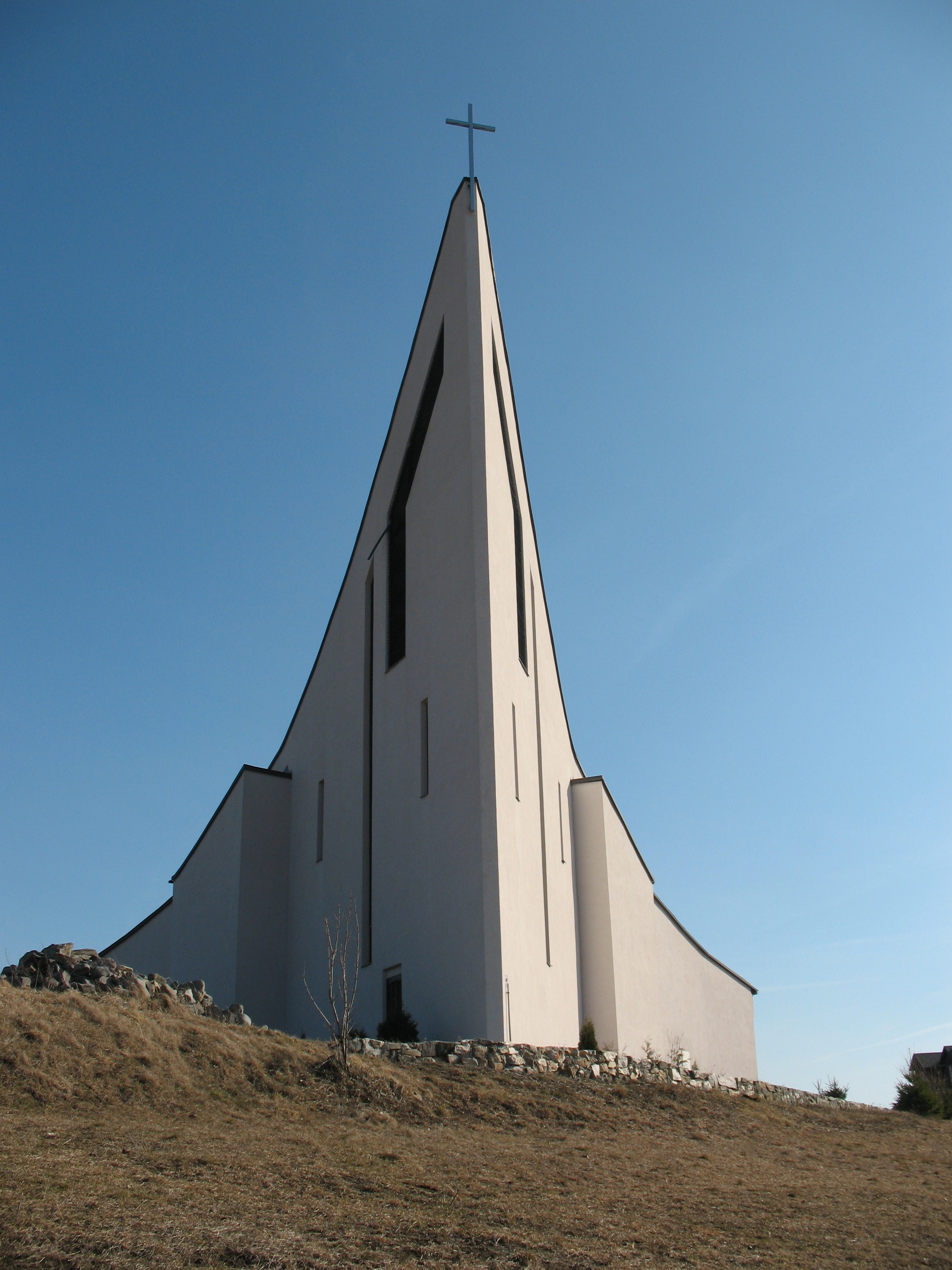

- Flag Coat of arms

- Location of Hriňová in the Banská Bystrica Region Location of Hriňová in Slovakia
- Coordinates: 48.57°N 19.52°E
- Country: Slovakia
- Region: Banská Bystrica Region
- District: Detva District
- First mentioned: 1863

Government
  - Mayor: Mgr. Stanislav Horník

Area
  - Total: 126.48 km^{2} (48.83 sq mi)
- Elevation: 669 m (2,195 ft)

Population (2025)
  - Total: 6,867
- Time zone: UTC+1 (CET)
  - Summer (DST): UTC+2 (CEST)
- Postal code: 962 05
- Area code: +421 45
- Vehicle registration plate (until 2022): DT
- Website: www.hrinova.sk

Hriňová (German: Hrinau; Hungarian: Herencsvölgy) is a town in the Detva District of central Slovakia.

== Etymology ==
The name is derived from a dialect word for horseradish. Slovak: chren - a horseradish, dialect: hriň (noun), hriňová (fem. adjective).

== Geography ==
The town is located on the Slatina river, under the Poľana mountains. It is located app. 13 km (8.08 mi) from Detva and 40 km (24.85 mi) from Zvolen. A dam is located above the town.

== Geography ==
The municipality lies at an altitude of 669 metres (2,195 ft) and covers an area of 126.48 km^{2} (48.83 sq mi) (2025).

== History ==
At first, the town was a part of Detva municipality, which arose in the 17th century. In 1891, Hriňová became a separate municipality from Detva. It has town status since 1 January 1989.

== Population ==
Population statistic (10 years)
| Year | 1995 | 2005 | 2015 | 2025 |
|---|---|---|---|---|
| Count | 8534 | 8067 | 7612 | 6867 |
| Difference | | −5.47% | −5.64% | −9.78% |

Population statistic
| Year | 2024 | 2025 |
|---|---|---|
| Count | 6931 | 6867 |
| Difference | | −0.92% |

It has a population of 6867 people (31 December 2025).

=== Ethnicity ===
Census 2021 (1+ %)
| Ethnicity | Number | Fraction |
|---|---|---|
| Slovak | 6785 | 94.47% |
| Not found out | 391 | 5.44% |
| Total | 7182 | |

In year 2021 was 7182 people by ethnicity 6785 as Slovak, 391 as Not found out, 30 as Czech, 13 as Other, 10 as Hungarian, 9 as Romani, 8 as Polish, 7 as Italian, 6 as Russian, 3 as Rusyn, 3 as German, 3 as Albanian, 2 as Ukrainian and 1 as Moravian.

Note on population: The difference values of population numbers in the table "Population statistic" and in the sections "Ethnicity" & "Religion" is caused by the use of various statistical methods.

=== Religion ===
Census 2021 (1+ %)
| Religion | Number | Fraction |
|---|---|---|
| Roman Catholic Church | 5518 | 76.83% |
| None | 890 | 12.39% |
| Not found out | 511 | 7.12% |
| Evangelical Church | 127 | 1.77% |
| Total | 7182 | |

In year 2021 was 7182 people by religion 5518 from Roman Catholic Church, 890 from None, 511 from Not found out, 127 from Evangelical Church, 49 from Greek Catholic Church, 18 from Other, 11 from Ad hoc movements, 9 from Eastern Orthodox Church, 9 from Christian Congregations in Slovakia, 7 from Jehovah's Witnesses, 6 from Other and not ascertained christian church, 5 from Calvinist Church, 5 from Buddhism, 3 from Paganism and natural spirituality, 3 from Church of the Brethren, 2 from United Methodist Church, 2 from Czechoslovak Hussite Church, 2 from Apostolic Church, 1 from Old Catholic Church, 1 from Hinduism, 1 from Seventh-day Adventist Church, 1 from Baptists Church and 1 from Bahá'i Community.

== See also ==
- List of municipalities and towns in Slovakia

== Genealogical resources ==
The records for genealogical research are available at the state archive "Statny Archiv in Banska Bystrica, Slovakia"

- Roman Catholic church records (births/marriages/deaths): 1763-1934 (parish B)
