= Slatinské Lazy =

Slatinské Lazy Szalatnairtvány
- Municipality
- Flag

- Location of Slatinské Lazy in the Banská Bystrica Region Location of Slatinské Lazy in Slovakia
- Coordinates: 48.50°N 19.25°E
- Country: Slovakia
- Region: Banská Bystrica Region
- District: Detva District
- First mentioned: 1930

Area
  - Total: 7.21 km^{2} (2.78 sq mi)
- Elevation: 465 m (1,526 ft)

Population (2025)
  - Total: 534
- Time zone: UTC+1 (CET)
  - Summer (DST): UTC+2 (CEST)
- Postal code: 962 25
- Area code: +421 45
- Vehicle registration plate (until 2022): DT
- Website: www.slatinskelazy.sk

Slatinské Lazy (Hungarian: Szalatnairtvány) is a village and municipality in Detva District, in the Banská Bystrica Region of central Slovakia.

== Geography ==
The municipality lies at an altitude of 465 metres (1,526 ft) and covers an area of 7.21 km^{2} (2.78 sq mi) (2025).

== Population ==
Population statistic (10 years)
Year	1995	2005	2015	2025
Count	461	503	506	534
Difference		+9.11%	+0.59%	+5.53%

Population statistic
Year	2024	2025
Count	530	534
Difference		+0.75%

It has a population of 534 people (31 December 2025).

=== Ethnicity ===
Census 2021 (1+ %)
Ethnicity	Number	Fraction
Slovak	515	95.9%
Not found out	20	3.72%
Czech	6	1.11%
Total	537	

In year 2021 was 537 people by ethnicity 515 as Slovak, 20 as Not found out, 6 as Czech, 2 as Russian, 1 as Romani, 1 as German, 1 as Hungarian and 1 as Other.

Note on population: The difference values of population numbers in the table "Population statistic" and in the sections "Ethnicity" & "Religion" is caused by the use of various statistical methods.

=== Religion ===
Census 2021 (1+ %)
Religion	Number	Fraction
Roman Catholic Church	258	48.04%
None	127	23.65%
Evangelical Church	111	20.67%
Not found out	18	3.35%
Other and not ascertained christian church	7	1.3%
Total	537	

In year 2021 was 537 people by religion 258 from Roman Catholic Church, 127 from None, 111 from Evangelical Church, 18 from Not found out, 7 from Other and not ascertained christian church, 4 from Greek Catholic Church, 3 from Old Catholic Church, 2 from Eastern Orthodox Church, 2 from Jehovah's Witnesses, 2 from Other, 1 from United Methodist Church, 1 from Czechoslovak Hussite Church and 1 from Ad hoc movements.
