= Podkriváň =

Podkriváň Divényoroszi
- Municipality
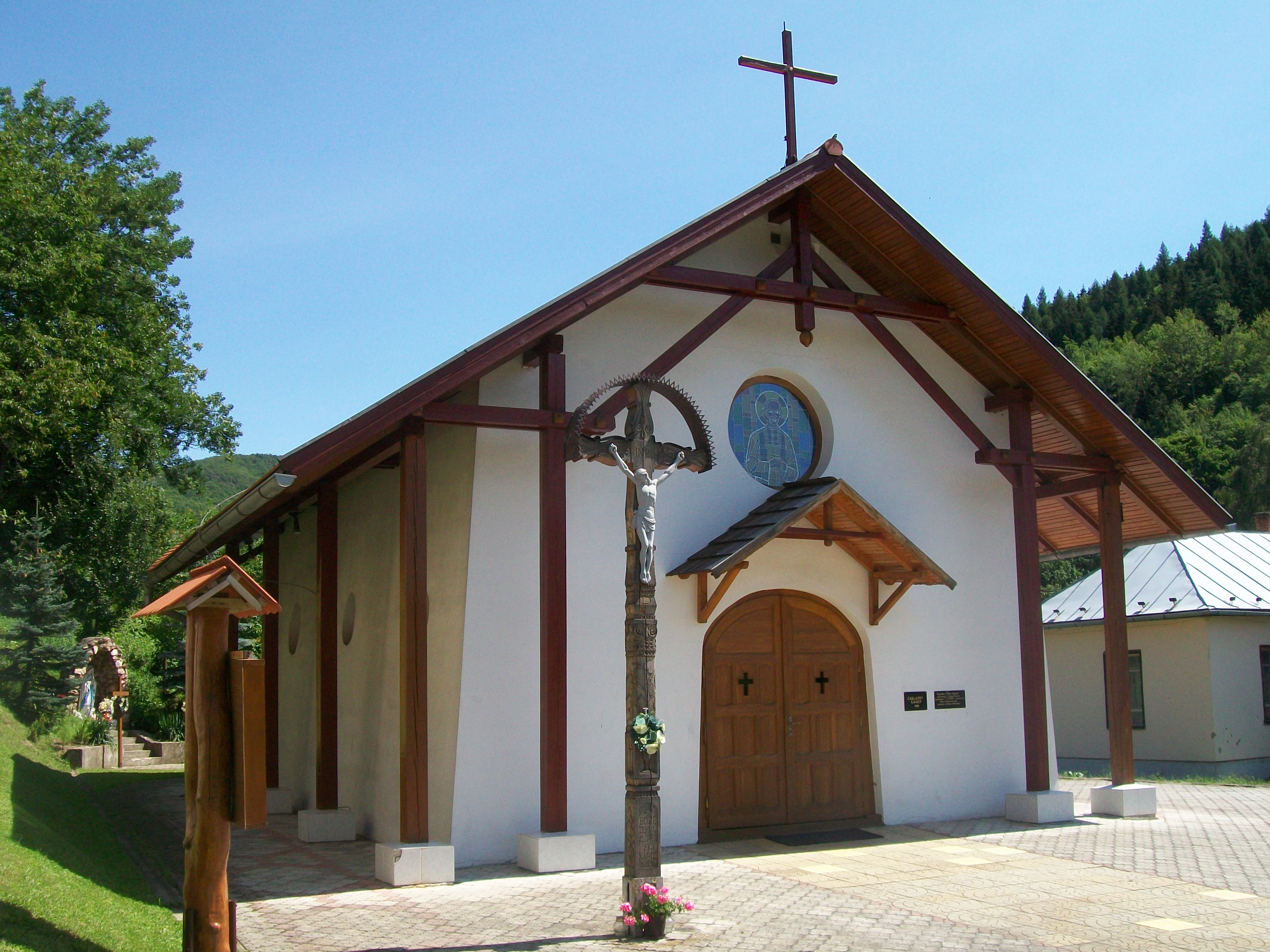
- Chapel of Saint John Vianney

- Flag

- Location of Podkriváň in the Banská Bystrica Region Location of Podkriváň in Slovakia
- Coordinates: 48.50°N 19.45°E
- Country: Slovakia
- Region: Banská Bystrica Region
- District: Detva District
- First mentioned: 1742

Area
  - Total: 25.91 km^{2} (10.00 sq mi)
- Elevation: 492 m (1,614 ft)

Population (2025)
  - Total: 558
- Time zone: UTC+1 (CET)
  - Summer (DST): UTC+2 (CEST)
- Postal code: 985 51
- Area code: +421 47
- Vehicle registration plate (until 2022): DT
- Website: www.obecpodkrivan.sk

Podkriváň (Hungarian: Divényoroszi) is a village and municipality in Detva District, in the Banská Bystrica Region of central Slovakia.

== Geography ==
The municipality lies at an altitude of 492 metres (1,614 ft) and covers an area of 25.91 km^{2} (10.00 sq mi) (2025).

== Population ==
Population statistic (10 years)
Year	1995	2005	2015	2025
Count	704	619	592	558
Difference		−12.07%	−4.36%	−5.74%

Population statistic
Year	2024	2025
Count	561	558
Difference		−0.53%

It has a population of 558 people (31 December 2025).

=== Ethnicity ===
Census 2021 (1+ %)
Ethnicity	Number	Fraction
Slovak	556	97.71%
Not found out	8	1.4%
Total	569	

In year 2021 was 569 people by ethnicity 556 as Slovak, 8 as Not found out, 5 as Moravian, 4 as Hungarian, 3 as Czech, 2 as Romani, 2 as Other and 1 as German.

Note on population: The difference values of population numbers in the table "Population statistic" and in the sections "Ethnicity" & "Religion" is caused by the use of various statistical methods.

=== Religion ===
Census 2021 (1+ %)
Religion	Number	Fraction
Roman Catholic Church	413	72.58%
None	98	17.22%
Evangelical Church	32	5.62%
Not found out	7	1.23%
Total	569	

In year 2021 was 569 people by religion 413 from Roman Catholic Church, 98 from None, 32 from Evangelical Church, 7 from Not found out, 4 from Calvinist Church, 3 from Greek Catholic Church, 3 from Ad hoc movements, 2 from Christian Congregations in Slovakia, 2 from Other, 2 from Baptists Church, 1 from Jehovah's Witnesses, 1 from Hinduism and 1 from Buddhism.
