= Hrochoť =

Hrochoť Horhát
- Municipality
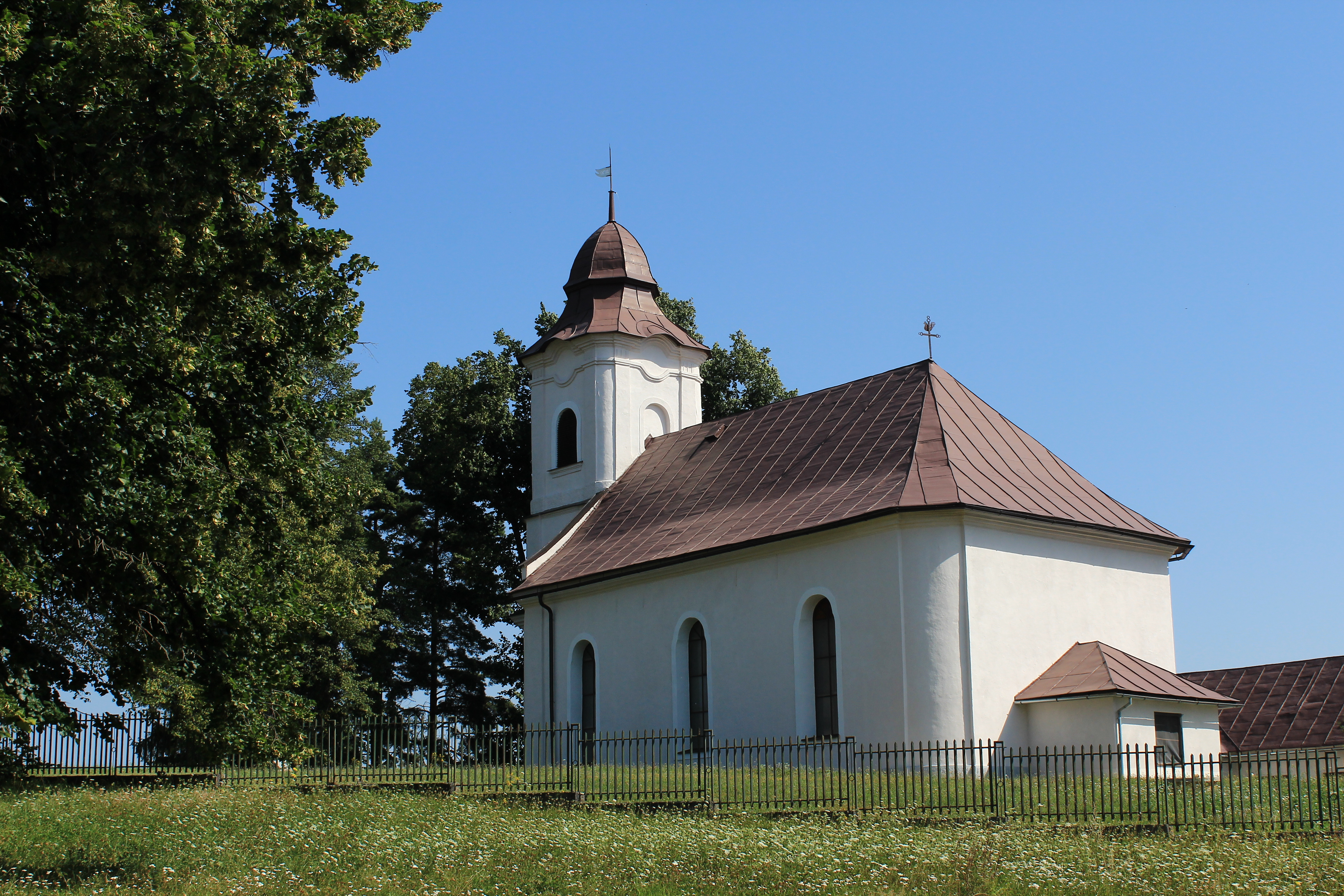
- Lutheran church in Hrochoť

- Flag

- Location of Hrochoť in the Banská Bystrica Region Location of Hrochoť in Slovakia
- Coordinates: 48.67°N 19.32°E
- Country: Slovakia
- Region: Banská Bystrica Region
- District: Banská Bystrica District
- First mentioned: 1424

Area
  - Total: 34.74 km^{2} (13.41 sq mi)
- Elevation: 622 m (2,041 ft)

Population (2025)
  - Total: 1,425
- Time zone: UTC+1 (CET)
  - Summer (DST): UTC+2 (CEST)
- Postal code: 976 37
- Area code: +421 48
- Vehicle registration plate (until 2022): BB
- Website: www.hrochot.sk

Hrochoť (Hungarian: Horhát) is a village and municipality of the Banská Bystrica District in the Banská Bystrica Region of Slovakia.

== Etymology ==
The etymology is not completely clear. Slovak (dialect) hrochotať - to make a noise, hrochoť - a sharp noise sound (i.e. compare with Russian грохотать). Rudolf Krajčovič associates the name with pastoralism and the sound of the whip. There are also other meanings of the word.

== Geography ==
The municipality lies at an altitude of 622 metres (2,041 ft) and covers an area of 34.74 km^{2} (13.41 sq mi) (2025).

== Population ==
Population statistic (10 years)
Year	1995	2005	2015	2025
Count	1333	1432	1501	1425
Difference		+7.42%	+4.81%	−5.06%

Population statistic
Year	2024	2025
Count	1428	1425
Difference		−0.21%

It has a population of 1425 people (31 December 2025).

=== Ethnicity ===
Census 2021 (1+ %)
Ethnicity	Number	Fraction
Slovak	1314	90.49%
Not found out	126	8.67%
Romani	23	1.58%
Total	1452	

In year 2021 was 1452 people by ethnicity 1314 as Slovak, 126 as Not found out, 23 as Romani, 6 as Hungarian, 3 as Czech, 1 as Silesian and 1 as Russian.

Note on population: The difference values of population numbers in the table "Population statistic" and in the sections "Ethnicity" & "Religion" is caused by the use of various statistical methods.

=== Religion ===
Census 2021 (1+ %)
Religion	Number	Fraction
Evangelical Church	764	52.62%
None	272	18.73%
Roman Catholic Church	228	15.7%
Not found out	144	9.92%
Total	1452	

In year 2021 was 1452 people by religion 764 from Evangelical Church, 272 from None, 228 from Roman Catholic Church, 144 from Not found out, 10 from Greek Catholic Church, 9 from Jehovah's Witnesses, 8 from Other and not ascertained christian church, 4 from Church of the Brethren, 2 from Eastern Orthodox Church, 2 from Other, 2 from United Methodist Church, 2 from Buddhism, 1 from Old Catholic Church, 1 from Paganism and natural spirituality, 1 from Christian Congregations in Slovakia, 1 from Church of Jesus Christ of Latter-day Saints and 1 from Ad hoc movements.

== Economy ==
It is one of the touristic startpoints to Poľana region. The village mostly preserves its architecture from the beginning of the 20th century, consisting of typical wooden houses. Many people work in the neighboring Zvolen.
