= Dúbravy =

Village and municipality in Slovakia

Dúbravy Kisócsa
- Municipality
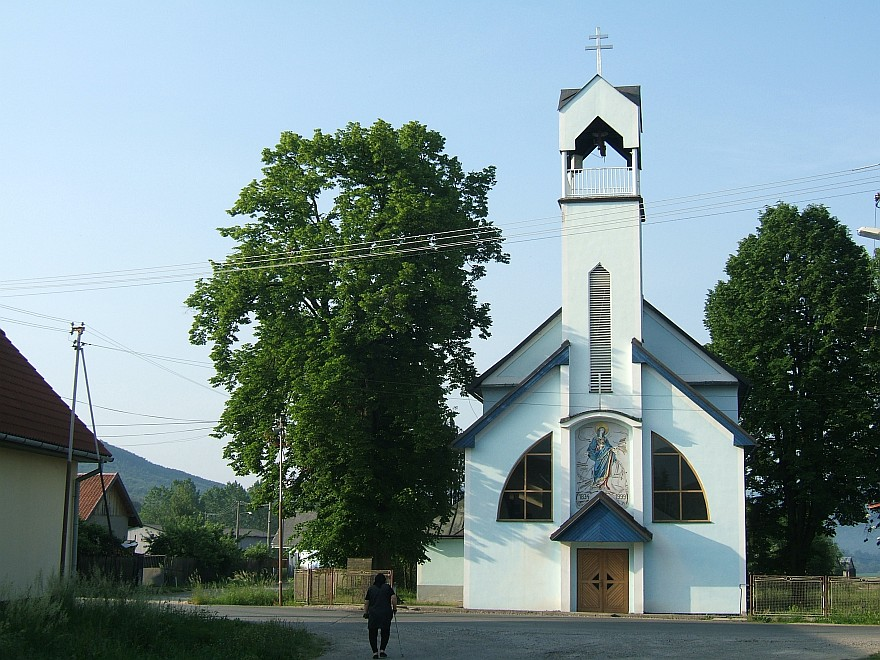

- Flag

- Location of Dúbravy in the Banská Bystrica Region Location of Dúbravy in Slovakia
- Coordinates: 48.58°N 19.37°E
- Country: Slovakia
- Region: Banská Bystrica Region
- District: Detva District
- First mentioned: 1808

Area
  - Total: 19.54 km^{2} (7.54 sq mi)
- Elevation: 477 m (1,565 ft)

Population (2025)
  - Total: 952
- Time zone: UTC+1 (CET)
  - Summer (DST): UTC+2 (CEST)
- Postal code: 962 24
- Area code: +421 45
- Vehicle registration plate (until 2022): DT
- Website: www.dubravy.sk

Dúbravy (before 1927 Očovská Dúbrava, Ošowské Dubrawy; Hungarian: Kisócsa, before 1907 Dobróocsova) is a village and municipality in Detva District, in the Banská Bystrica Region of central Slovakia.

== Geography ==
The municipality lies at an altitude of 477 metres (1,565 ft) and covers an area of 19.54 km^{2} (7.54 sq mi) (2025).

== History ==
The village arose in the late 18th century, when it was separated from Očová.

== Population ==
Population statistic (10 years)
Year	1995	2005	2015	2025
Count	1004	978	925	952
Difference		−2.58%	−5.41%	+2.91%

Population statistic
Year	2024	2025
Count	955	952
Difference		−0.31%

It has a population of 952 people (31 December 2025).

=== Ethnicity ===
Census 2021 (1+ %)
Ethnicity	Number	Fraction
Slovak	931	97.69%
Not found out	15	1.57%
Czech	11	1.15%
Total	953	

In year 2021 was 953 people by ethnicity 931 as Slovak, 15 as Not found out, 11 as Czech, 7 as Romani, 5 as Russian, 2 as Other and 1 as Moravian.

Note on population: The difference values of population numbers in the table "Population statistic" and in the sections "Ethnicity" & "Religion" is caused by the use of various statistical methods.

=== Religion ===
Census 2021 (1+ %)
Religion	Number	Fraction
Roman Catholic Church	723	75.87%
None	148	15.53%
Evangelical Church	30	3.15%
Not found out	28	2.94%
Greek Catholic Church	14	1.47%
Total	953	

In year 2021 was 953 people by religion 723 from Roman Catholic Church, 148 from None, 30 from Evangelical Church, 28 from Not found out, 14 from Greek Catholic Church, 3 from Other and not ascertained christian church, 3 from Christian Congregations in Slovakia, 2 from Calvinist Church and 2 from Ad hoc movements.

== Genealogical resources ==
The records for genealogical research are available at the state archive "Statny Archiv in Banska Bystrica, Slovakia"

- Roman Catholic church records (births/marriages/deaths): 1768-1895 (parish B)

== See also ==
- List of municipalities and towns in Slovakia
