= Detva District =

Coordinates: 48°33′37″N 19°25′9″E

- District
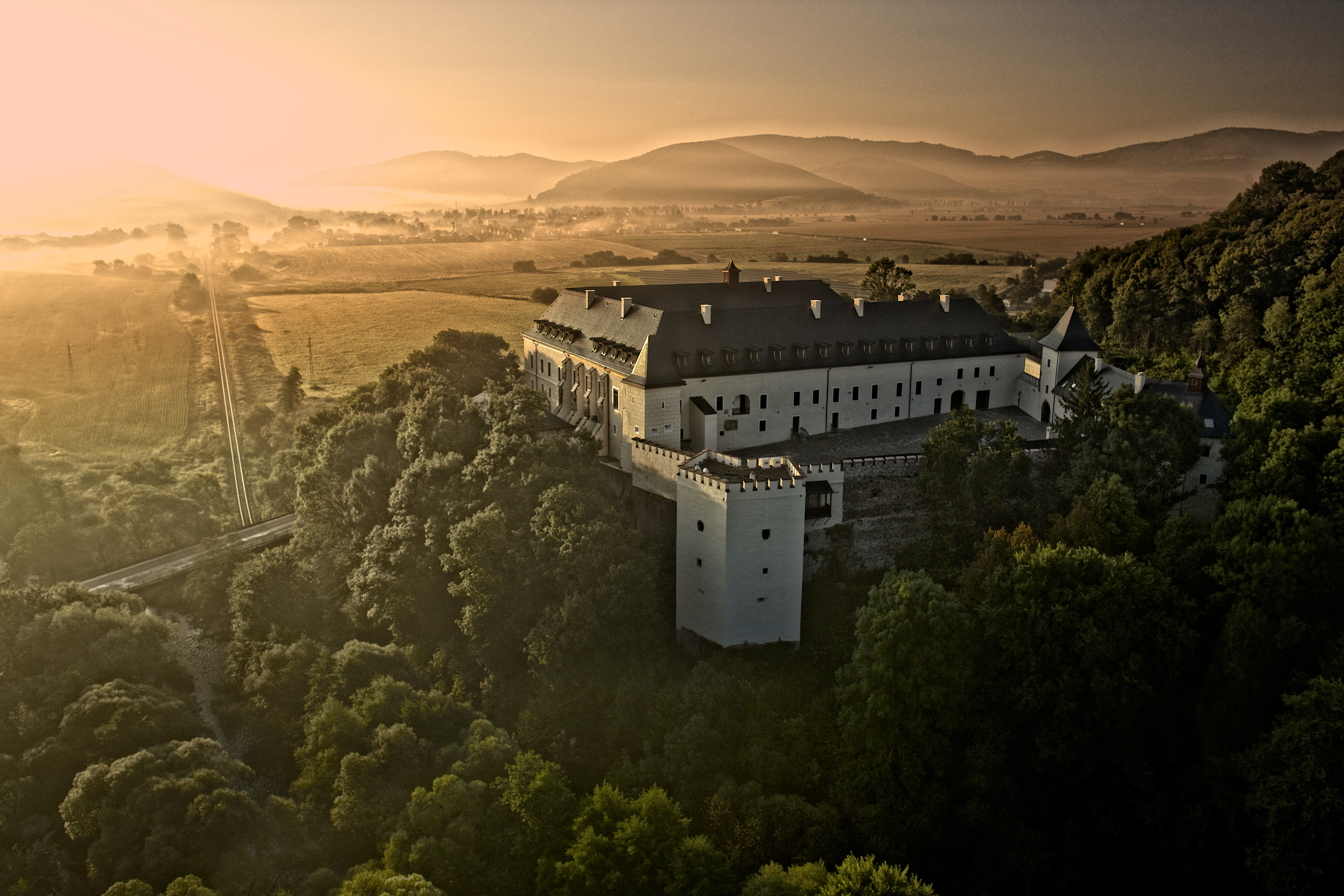
- Country: Slovakia
- Region (kraj): Banská Bystrica Region
- Seat: Detva

Area
  - Total: 449.14 km^{2} (173.41 sq mi)

Population (2025)
  - Total: 30,199
- Time zone: UTC+1 (CET)
  - Summer (DST): UTC+2 (CEST)
- Telephone prefix: 045
- Vehicle registration plate (until 2022): DT
- Municipalities: 15

Detva District (Slovak: okres Detva) is a district of the Banská Bystrica Region in central Slovakia. Until 1918, most of the area belonged to the Zvolen county, apart from Látky, Podkriváň and Horný Tisovník in the south and east which formed part of the county of Nógrád.

== Population ==
Population statistic (10 years)
Year	1995	2005	2015	2025
Count	34,104	33,070	32,505	30,199
Difference		−3.03%	−1.70%	−7.09%

Population statistic
Year	2024	2025
Count	30,380	30,199
Difference		−0.59%

It has a population of 30,199 people (31 December 2025).

Historical population
Year	Pop.	±%
1970	33,912	—
1980	35,505	+4.7%
1991	34,316	−3.3%
2001	33,514	−2.3%
2011	32,896	−1.8%
2021	31,034	−5.7%
Source: Statistical Office of the Slovak Republic

=== Ethnicity ===
Census 2021 (1+ %)
Ethnicity	Number	Fraction
Slovak	29,473	93.24%
Not found out	1338	4.23%
Total	31,607	

In year 2021 was 31,607 people by ethnicity 29,473 as Slovak, 1338 as Not found out, 271 as Romani, 188 as Czech, 68 as Other, 65 as Hungarian, 40 as Russian, 27 as Ukrainian, 24 as Polish, 17 as German, 14 as Vietnamese, 14 as Italian, 14 as Moravian, 13 as Rusyn, 8 as Croatian, 7 as Jewish, 5 as English, 5 as Albanian, 4 as Irish, 3 as Bulgarian, 2 as Chinese, 2 as Serbian, 2 as Silesian, 1 as Romanian, 1 as Austrian and 1 as Canadian.

Note on population: The difference values of population numbers in the table "Population statistic" and in the sections "Ethnicity" & "Religion" is caused by the use of various statistical methods.

=== Religion ===
Census 2021 (1+ %)
Religion	Number	Fraction
Roman Catholic Church	21,764	70.13%
None	5511	17.76%
Not found out	1912	6.16%
Evangelical Church	1163	3.75%
Total	31,034	

In year 2021 was 31,034 people by religion 21,764 from Roman Catholic Church, 5511 from None, 1912 from Not found out, 1163 from Evangelical Church, 185 from Greek Catholic Church, 72 from Other, 65 from Ad hoc movements, 60 from Other and not ascertained christian church, 56 from Christian Congregations in Slovakia, 46 from Eastern Orthodox Church, 44 from Jehovah's Witnesses, 29 from Calvinist Church, 25 from Baptists Church, 20 from Buddhism, 18 from Paganism and natural spirituality, 16 from Islam, 12 from Old Catholic Church, 8 from Czechoslovak Hussite Church, 7 from United Methodist Church, 6 from Hinduism, 4 from Seventh-day Adventist Church, 4 from Apostolic Church, 3 from Church of the Brethren, 2 from Jewish community, 1 from Church of Jesus Christ of Latter-day Saints and 1 from Bahá'i Community.

== Municipalities ==
Municipality	Area [km^{2}]	Population
Detva	68.08	13,416
Detvianska Huta	14.31	695
Dúbravy	19.54	952
Horný Tisovník	32.16	191
Hriňová	126.48	6,867
Klokoč	9.83	472
Korytárky	9.01	936
Kriváň	9.13	1,754
Látky	45.73	537
Podkriváň	25.91	558
Slatinské Lazy	7.21	534
Stará Huta	24.57	302
Stožok	8.94	1,195
Vígľaš	32.09	1,452
Vígľašská Huta-Kalinka	16.19	338

Population and area values are current for year 2025.
