= Detvianska Huta =

Detvianska Huta Zólyommiklós
- Municipality
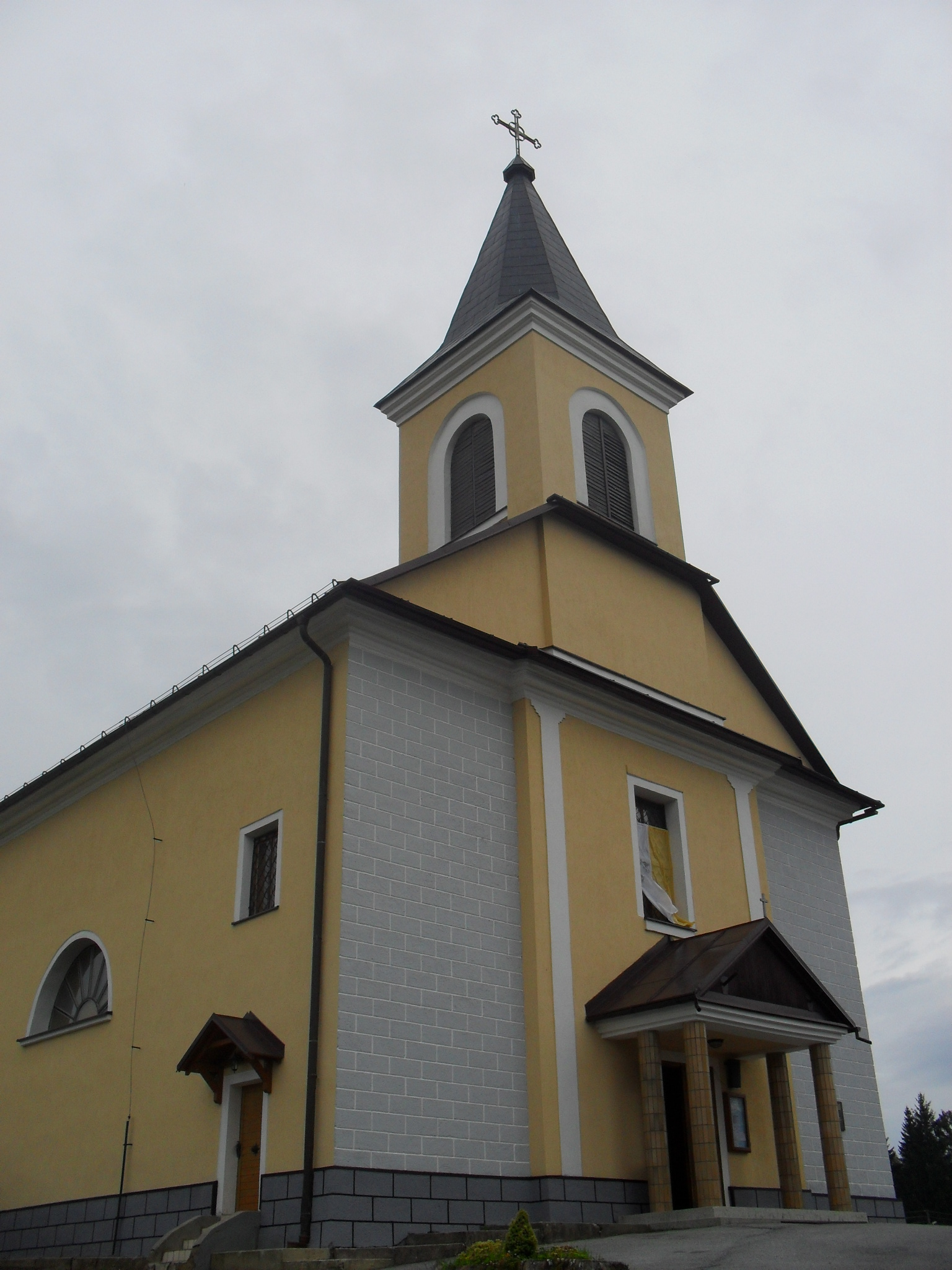

- Flag Coat of arms

- Location of Detvianska Huta in the Banská Bystrica Region Location of Detvianska Huta in Slovakia
- Coordinates: 48.57°N 19.60°E
- Country: Slovakia
- Region: Banská Bystrica Region
- District: Detva District
- First mentioned: 1808

Area
  - Total: 14.31 km^{2} (5.53 sq mi)
- Elevation: 850 m (2,790 ft)

Population (2025)
  - Total: 695
- Time zone: UTC+1 (CET)
  - Summer (DST): UTC+2 (CEST)
- Postal code: 962 06
- Area code: +421 45
- Vehicle registration plate (until 2022): DT
- Website: www.detvianskahuta.eu

Detvianska Huta (Mikulášova Huta, 1880 Mikulássowá; Hungarian: Zólyommiklós) is a village and municipality in Detva District, in the Banská Bystrica Region of central Slovakia.

== Geography ==
The municipality lies at an altitude of 850 metres (2,790 ft) and covers an area of 14.31 km^{2} (5.53 sq mi) (2025).

== History ==
It arose in the late 18th century by a merge of villages Komárno and Bratkovica and glasswork settlement (Detvianska Huta literally means "Detva (Glass) Works"). Glassworks stopped its production at the end of 19th century and from 1920 the village bears its present name.

== Population ==
Population statistic (10 years)
Year	1995	2005	2015	2025
Count	808	751	707	695
Difference		−7.05%	−5.85%	−1.69%

Population statistic
Year	2024	2025
Count	689	695
Difference		+0.87%

It has a population of 695 people (31 December 2025).

=== Ethnicity ===
Census 2021 (1+ %)
Ethnicity	Number	Fraction
Slovak	647	97.88%
Not found out	10	1.51%
Total	661	

In year 2021 was 661 people by ethnicity 647 as Slovak, 10 as Not found out, 3 as Other, 2 as Czech, 2 as Italian, 1 as Romani, 1 as Hungarian and 1 as Canadian.

Note on population: The difference values of population numbers in the table "Population statistic" and in the sections "Ethnicity" & "Religion" is caused by the use of various statistical methods.

=== Religion ===
Census 2021 (1+ %)
Religion	Number	Fraction
Roman Catholic Church	578	87.44%
None	58	8.77%
Not found out	10	1.51%
Evangelical Church	8	1.21%
Total	661	

In year 2021 was 661 people by religion 578 from Roman Catholic Church, 58 from None, 10 from Not found out, 8 from Evangelical Church, 2 from Paganism and natural spirituality, 2 from Ad hoc movements, 1 from Jehovah's Witnesses, 1 from Other and 1 from Greek Catholic Church.

== Famous people ==
- Milan Kolibiar, mathematician

== Genealogical resources ==
The records for genealogical research are available at the state archive "Statny Archiv in Banska Bystrica, Slovakia"

- Roman Catholic church records (births/marriages/deaths): 1763–1934 (parish A)

== See also ==
- List of municipalities and towns in Slovakia
