= Vígľaš =

- Municipality
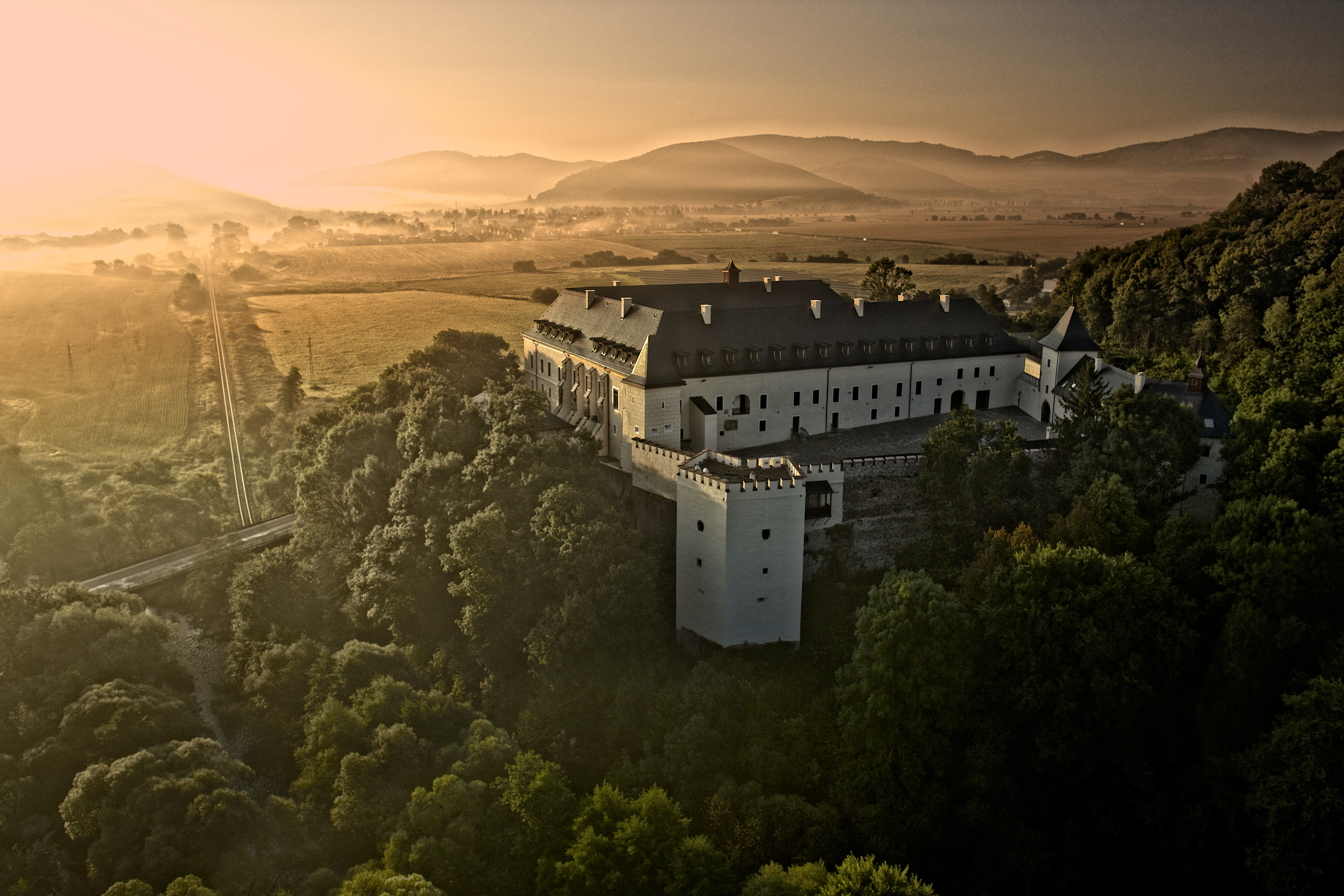

- Flag

- Location of Vígľaš in the Banská Bystrica Region Location of Vígľaš in Slovakia
- Coordinates: 48.57°N 19.30°E
- Country: Slovakia
- Region: Banská Bystrica Region
- District: Detva District
- First mentioned: 1393

Area
  - Total: 32.09 km^{2} (12.39 sq mi)
- Elevation: 352 m (1,155 ft)

Population (2025)
  - Total: 1,452
- Time zone: UTC+1 (CET)
  - Summer (DST): UTC+2 (CEST)
- Postal code: 962 02
- Area code: +421 45
- Vehicle registration plate (until 2022): DT
- Website: www.viglas.net

Vígľaš (Hungarian: Végles) is a village and municipality in Detva District, in the Banská Bystrica Region of central Slovakia.

== Geography ==
The municipality lies at an altitude of 352 metres (1,155 ft) and covers an area of 32.09 km^{2} (12.39 sq mi) (2025).

== Etymology ==
The name is of Hungarian origin: vég les (Weegles 1395), free translation "at the end", "a tree stand at the edge". The name was motivated by a royal hunting ground.

== Climate ==
Lowest ever temperature recorded in Slovakia was recorded in Vígľaš in Pštrusa neighbourhood. During early morning of 11 February 1929, the temperature of -41,0 °C was recorded here. The record remains in place to this day. The temperature, however, was not the lowest in then-Czechoslovakia, beaten by 1,2 °C recorded in Litvínovice.

== Population ==
Population statistic (10 years)
Year	1995	2005	2015	2025
Count	1586	1680	1652	1452
Difference		+5.92%	−1.66%	−12.10%

Population statistic
Year	2024	2025
Count	1477	1452
Difference		−1.69%

It has a population of 1452 people (31 December 2025).

=== Ethnicity ===
Census 2021 (1+ %)
Ethnicity	Number	Fraction
Slovak	1469	95.01%
Not found out	46	2.97%
Romani	36	2.32%
Total	1546	

In year 2021 was 1546 people by ethnicity 1469 as Slovak, 46 as Not found out, 36 as Romani, 12 as Czech, 7 as Other, 6 as Russian, 4 as Ukrainian, 3 as Hungarian, 2 as Rusyn, 2 as German and 1 as Irish.

Note on population: The difference values of population numbers in the table "Population statistic" and in the sections "Ethnicity" & "Religion" is caused by the use of various statistical methods.

=== Religion ===
Census 2021 (1+ %)
Religion	Number	Fraction
Roman Catholic Church	973	62.94%
None	363	23.48%
Evangelical Church	95	6.14%
Not found out	69	4.46%
Total	1546	

In year 2021 was 1546 people by religion 973 from Roman Catholic Church, 363 from None, 95 from Evangelical Church, 69 from Not found out, 9 from Ad hoc movements, 8 from Greek Catholic Church, 7 from Eastern Orthodox Church, 7 from Other, 4 from Baptists Church, 3 from Jehovah's Witnesses, 2 from Christian Congregations in Slovakia, 1 from Old Catholic Church, 1 from Paganism and natural spirituality, 1 from Other and not ascertained christian church, 1 from Islam, 1 from United Methodist Church and 1 from Czechoslovak Hussite Church.

== Gallery ==
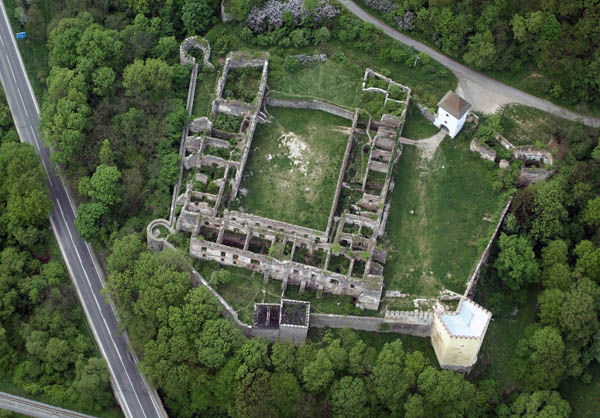

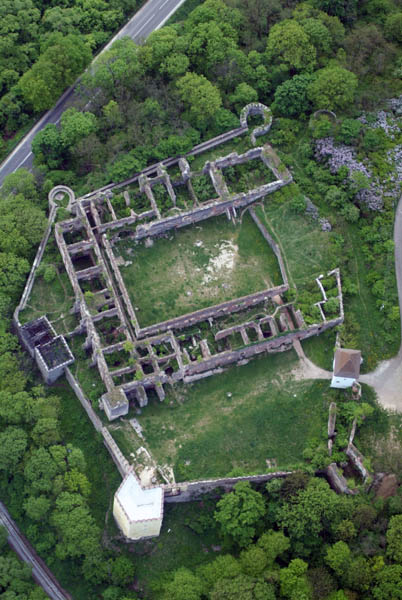
