= Korytárky =

Korytárky Teknős
- Municipality
- Flag Coat of arms

- Location of Korytárky in the Banská Bystrica Region Location of Korytárky in Slovakia
- Coordinates: 48.55°N 19.47°E
- Country: Slovakia
- Region: Banská Bystrica Region
- District: Detva District
- First mentioned: 1993

Area
  - Total: 9.01 km^{2} (3.48 sq mi)
- Elevation: 425 m (1,394 ft)

Population (2025)
  - Total: 936
- Time zone: UTC+1 (CET)
  - Summer (DST): UTC+2 (CEST)
- Postal code: 962 04
- Area code: +421 45
- Vehicle registration plate (until 2022): DT
- Website: www.korytarky.sk

Korytárky (Hungarian: Teknős) is a village and municipality in Detva District, in the Banská Bystrica Region of central Slovakia.

== Geography ==
The municipality lies at an altitude of 425 metres (1,394 ft) and covers an area of 9.01 km^{2} (3.48 sq mi) (2025).

== Population ==
Population statistic (10 years)
| Year | 1995 | 2005 | 2015 | 2025 |
|---|---|---|---|---|
| Count | 1041 | 1010 | 966 | 936 |
| Difference | | −2.97% | −4.35% | −3.10% |

Population statistic
| Year | 2024 | 2025 |
|---|---|---|
| Count | 941 | 936 |
| Difference | | −0.53% |

It has a population of 936 people (31 December 2025).

=== Ethnicity ===
Census 2021 (1+ %)
| Ethnicity | Number | Fraction |
|---|---|---|
| Slovak | 911 | 96.09% |
| Not found out | 36 | 3.79% |
| Total | 948 | |

In year 2021 was 948 people by ethnicity 911 as Slovak, 36 as Not found out, 4 as Czech, 1 as Romani, 1 as Rusyn, 1 as Polish, 1 as German and 1 as Hungarian.

Note on population: The difference values of population numbers in the table "Population statistic" and in the sections "Ethnicity" & "Religion" is caused by the use of various statistical methods.

=== Religion ===
Census 2021 (1+ %)
| Religion | Number | Fraction |
|---|---|---|
| Roman Catholic Church | 790 | 83.33% |
| None | 91 | 9.6% |
| Not found out | 40 | 4.22% |
| Evangelical Church | 13 | 1.37% |
| Total | 948 | |

In year 2021 was 948 people by religion 790 from Roman Catholic Church, 91 from None, 40 from Not found out, 13 from Evangelical Church, 8 from Greek Catholic Church, 5 from Christian Congregations in Slovakia and 1 from Other.

== Genealogical resources ==
The records for genealogical research are available at the state archive "Statny Archiv in Banska Bystrica, Slovakia"

- Roman Catholic church records (births/marriages/deaths): 1662-1905 (parish B)

== See also ==
- List of municipalities and towns in Slovakia
