= Klokoč, Slovakia =

Klokoč Hegyhát
- Municipality
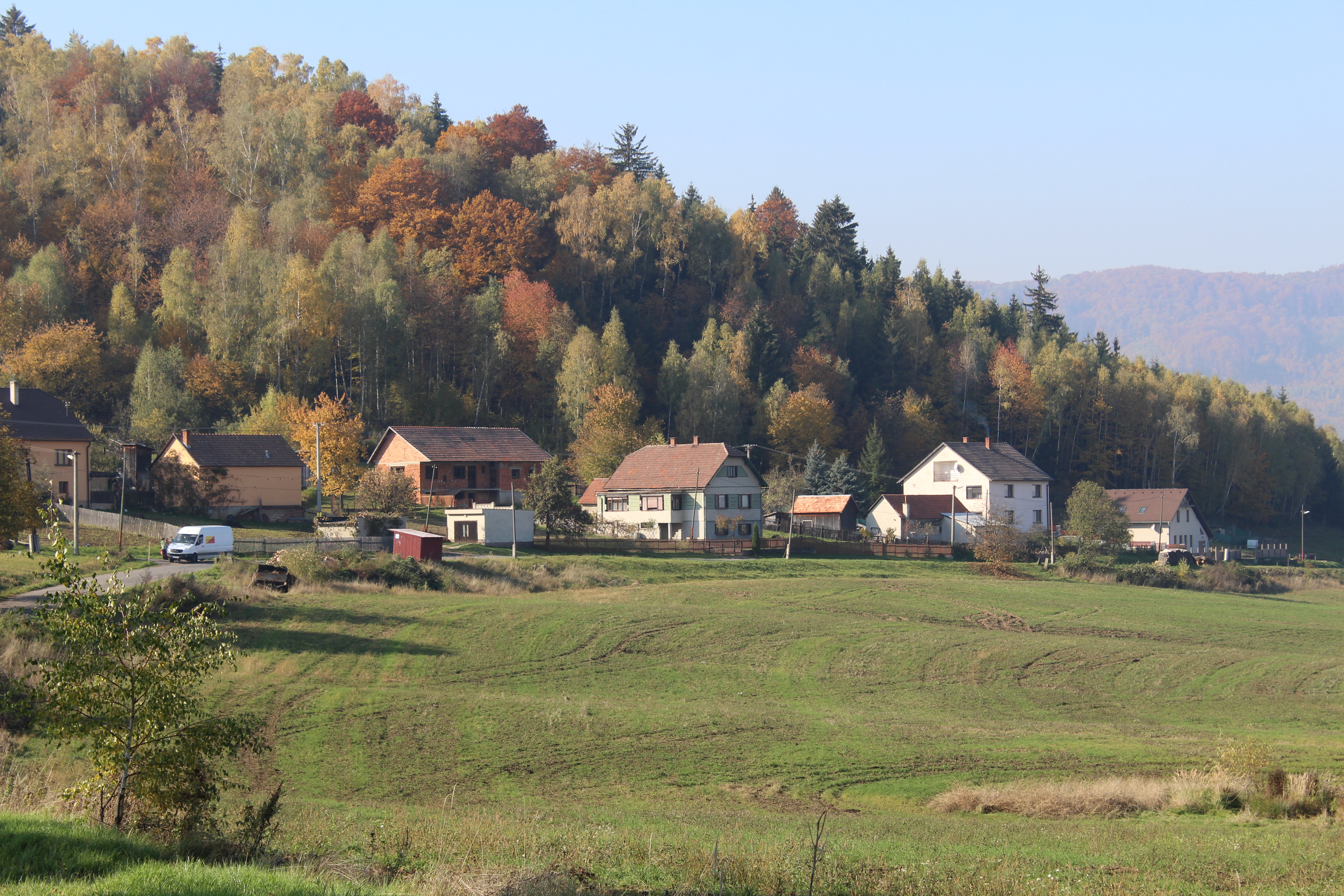

- Flag

- Location of Klokoč in the Banská Bystrica Region Location of Klokoč in Slovakia
- Coordinates: 48°30′N 19°21′E
- Country: Slovakia
- Region: Banská Bystrica Region
- District: Detva District
- First mentioned: 1786

Area
  - Total: 9.83 km^{2} (3.80 sq mi)
- Elevation: 560 m (1,840 ft)

Population (2025)
  - Total: 472
- Time zone: UTC+1 (CET)
  - Summer (DST): UTC+2 (CEST)
- Postal code: 962 25
- Area code: +421 45
- Vehicle registration plate (until 2022): DT
- Website: www.klokoc.sk

Klokoč (Hungarian: Hegyhát) is a village and municipality in Detva District, in the Banská Bystrica Region of central Slovakia.

== Geography ==
The municipality lies at an altitude of 560 metres (1,840 ft) and covers an area of 9.83 km^{2} (3.80 sq mi) (2025).

== Population ==
Population statistic (10 years)
Year	1995	2005	2015	2025
Count	456	457	504	472
Difference		+0.21%	+10.28%	−6.34%

Population statistic
Year	2024	2025
Count	472	472
Difference		+0%

It has a population of 472 people (31 December 2025).

=== Ethnicity ===
Census 2021 (1+ %)
Ethnicity	Number	Fraction
Slovak	470	97.71%
Not found out	10	2.07%
Total	481	

In year 2021 was 481 people by ethnicity 470 as Slovak, 10 as Not found out, 1 as Vietnamese, 1 as Hungarian and 1 as Other.

Note on population: The difference values of population numbers in the table "Population statistic" and in the sections "Ethnicity" & "Religion" is caused by the use of various statistical methods.

=== Religion ===
Census 2021 (1+ %)
Religion	Number	Fraction
Roman Catholic Church	350	72.77%
None	67	13.93%
Evangelical Church	41	8.52%
Not found out	9	1.87%
Other and not ascertained christian church	7	1.46%
Total	481	

In year 2021 was 481 people by religion 350 from Roman Catholic Church, 67 from None, 41 from Evangelical Church, 9 from Not found out, 7 from Other and not ascertained christian church, 3 from Greek Catholic Church, 3 from Ad hoc movements and 1 from Christian Congregations in Slovakia.

== Genealogical resources ==
The records for genealogical research are available at the state archive "Statny Archiv in Banska Bystrica, Slovakia"

- Roman Catholic church records (births/marriages/deaths): 1788-1935 (parish B)

== See also ==
- List of municipalities and towns in Slovakia
