= Kriváň (village) =

Kriváň Krivány
- Municipality
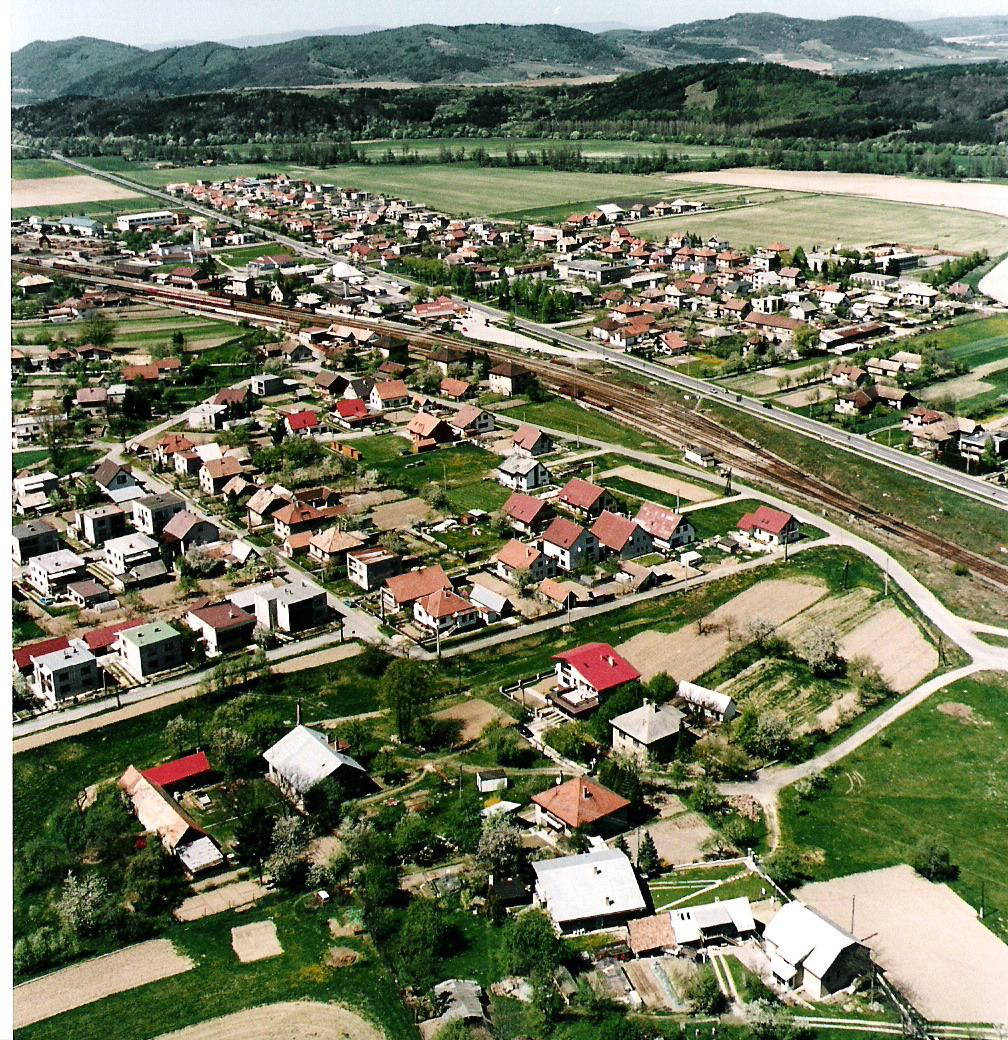

- Flag

- Location of Kriváň in the Banská Bystrica Region Location of Kriváň in Slovakia
- Coordinates: 48°31′50″N 19°26′50″E
- Country: Slovakia
- Region: Banská Bystrica Region
- District: Detva District
- First mentioned: 1955

Government
  - Mayor: Imrich Paľko

Area
  - Total: 9.13 km^{2} (3.53 sq mi)
- Elevation: 395 m (1,296 ft)

Population (2025)
  - Total: 1,754
- Time zone: UTC+1 (CET)
  - Summer (DST): UTC+2 (CEST)
- Postal code: 962 04
- Area code: +421 45
- Vehicle registration plate (until 2022): DT
- Website: www.obeckrivan.sk

Kriváň (Hungarian: Krivány) is a village and municipality in Detva District, in the Banská Bystrica Region of central Slovakia. It lies on the road track I/50, approximately in the halfway between Bratislava and Košice. The village had been established in 1955.

== Geography ==
The municipality lies at an altitude of 395 metres (1,296 ft) and covers an area of 9.13 km^{2} (3.53 sq mi) (2025).

== Population ==
Population statistic (10 years)
Year	1995	2005	2015	2025
Count	1624	1724	1710	1754
Difference		+6.15%	−0.81%	+2.57%

Population statistic
Year	2024	2025
Count	1739	1754
Difference		+0.86%

It has a population of 1754 people (31 December 2025).

=== Ethnicity ===
Census 2021 (1+ %)
Ethnicity	Number	Fraction
Slovak	1726	98.51%
Not found out	21	1.19%
Czech	18	1.02%
Total	1752	

In year 2021 was 1752 people by ethnicity 1726 as Slovak, 21 as Not found out, 18 as Czech, 4 as Other, 3 as Ukrainian, 3 as English, 2 as Russian, 2 as Hungarian, 1 as Rusyn and 1 as Croatian.

Note on population: The difference values of population numbers in the table "Population statistic" and in the sections "Ethnicity" & "Religion" is caused by the use of various statistical methods.

=== Religion ===
Census 2021 (1+ %)
Religion	Number	Fraction
Roman Catholic Church	1372	78.31%
None	283	16.15%
Evangelical Church	51	2.91%
Not found out	26	1.48%
Total	1752	

In year 2021 was 1752 people by religion 1372 from Roman Catholic Church, 283 from None, 51 from Evangelical Church, 26 from Not found out, 5 from Greek Catholic Church, 3 from Other and not ascertained christian church, 3 from Christian Congregations in Slovakia, 3 from Other, 3 from Ad hoc movements, 2 from Calvinist Church and 1 from Jewish community.

== Gallery ==
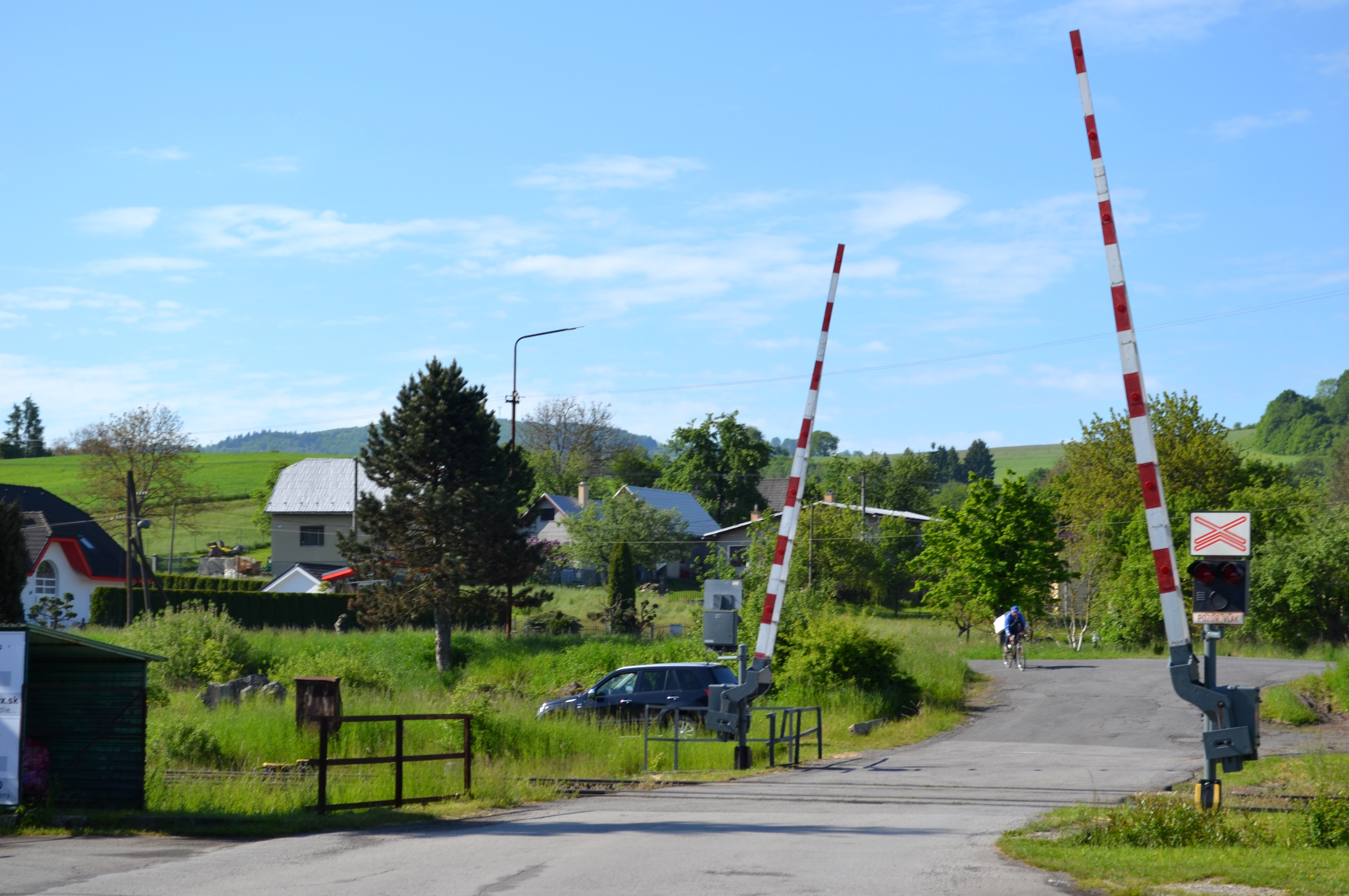
A Level crossing in Kriváň
