= Slavkov =

Slavkov may refer to:

== Places ==
=== Czech Republic ===
- Slavkov (Opava District), a municipality and village in the Moravian-Silesian Region
- Slavkov (Uherské Hradiště District), a municipality and village in the Zlín Region
- Slavkov, a village and part of Bohdalovice in the South Bohemian Region
- Slavkov, a village and part of Kozlov (Olomouc District) in the Olomouc Region
- Slavkov, a village and part of Olbramovice (Benešov District) in the Central Bohemian Region
- Slavkov Forest, a geomorphological region
- Slavkov pod Hostýnem, a municipality and village in the Zlín Region
- Slavkov u Brna, a town in the South Moravian Region
  - Slavkov Castle in Slavkov u Brna
- Horní Slavkov, a town in the Karlovy Vary Region

=== Slovakia ===
- Malý Slavkov, a municipality and village
- Nižný Slavkov, a municipality and village
- Veľký Slavkov, a municipality and village
- Vyšný Slavkov, a municipality and village

== People ==
- Slavkov (surname)

== Other ==
- Slavkov Declaration, a cooperation between the Czech Republic, Slovakia and Austria
