= Mária Šofranko =

Slovak educator and politician

Member of the National Council
- In office 12 May 2020 – 25 October 2023

Personal details
- Born: 30 June 1970 (age 55) Krompachy, Czechoslovakia (now Slovakia)
- Party: Ordinary People and Independent Personalities
- Children: 1
- Education: University of Prešov; Catholic University in Ružomberok

Mária Šofranko (born 30 June 1970 in Krompachy) is a Slovak teacher, activist and politician. From 2020 to 2023, she served as a Member of the National Council for the Ordinary People and Independent Personalities movement.

Šofranko studied pedagogy at the University of Prešov and the Catholic University in Ružomberok. She worked as a teacher and later headmistress at the elementary school in Domaňovce. In addition, she was in charge of the local culture centre in Smižany.

When elected MP, her swearing in was delayed to 12 May, for health reasons.

Šofranko is divorced, has one daughter. Her daughter is the partner of the hockey player Adam Jánošík.
