= Doľany =

Doľany may refer to:

- Doľany, Levoča District, Slovakia
- Doľany, Pezinok District, Slovakia
