= Ondruš =

Ondruš is a surname. Notable people with the surname include:

- Anton Ondruš (born 1950), Slovak football defender
- Branislav Ondruš, Slovak television presenter and politician
- Šimon Ondruš, Slovak linguist
