= Adam Jánošík =

Slovak ice hockey player

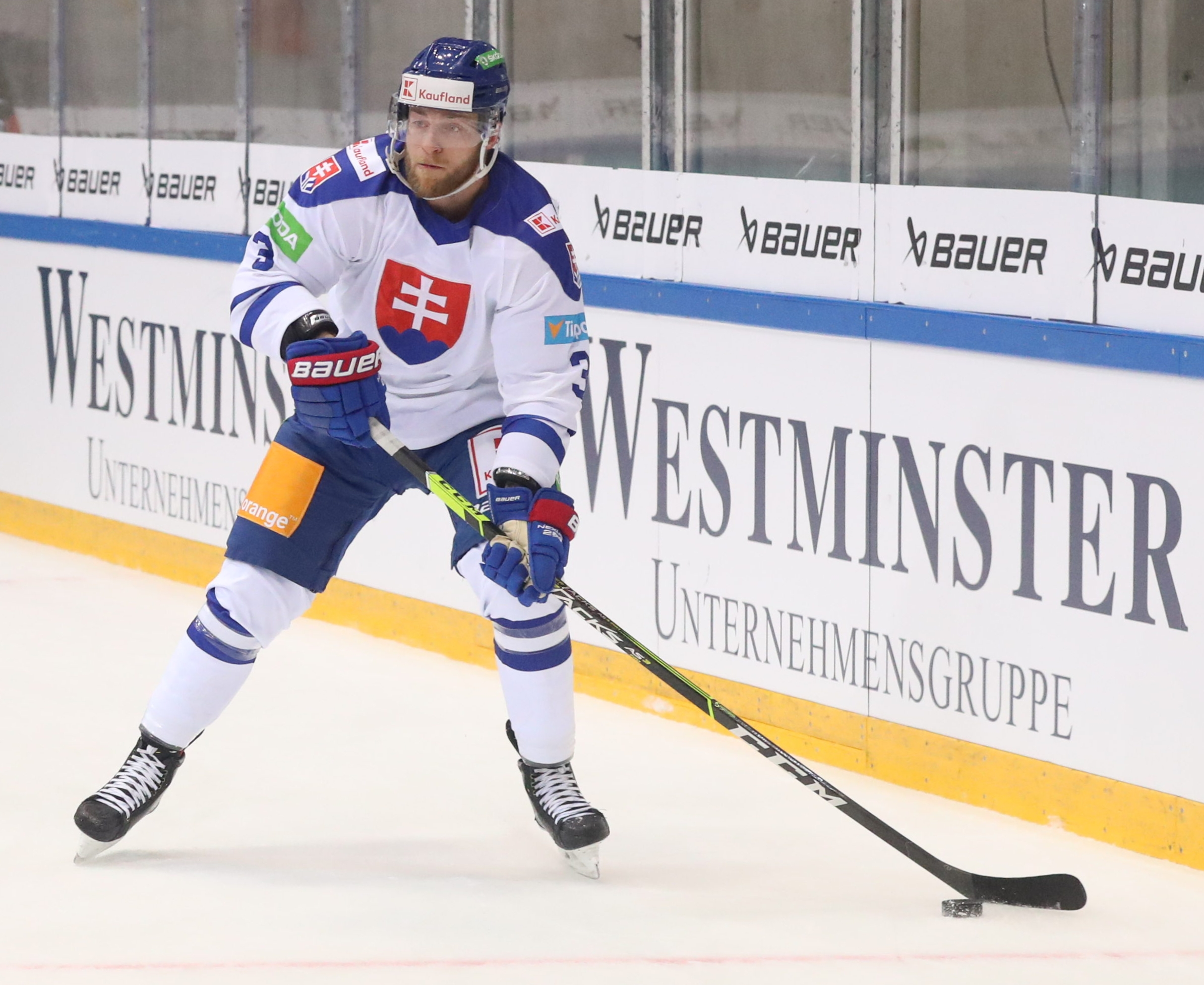
- Jánošík with Slovakia during the 2022 IIHF World Championship
- Born: 7 September 1992 (age 33) Spišská Nová Ves, Czechoslovakia
- Height: 5 ft 11 in (180 cm)
- Weight: 187 lb (85 kg; 13 st 5 lb)
- Position: Defence
- Shoots: Left
- Czech team Former teams: BK Mladá Boleslav; HC Bílí Tygři Liberec; Gatineau Olympiques; HC Benátky nad Jizerou; HC Košice; Piráti Chomutov; HC Slovan Bratislava; HC Litvínov; HC Plzeň; IK Oskarshamn
- National team: Slovakia
- NHL draft: 72nd overall, 2010; Tampa Bay Lightning
- Playing career: 2012–present

Adam Jánošík (born 7 September 1992) is a Slovak professional ice hockey defenceman. He is currently playing with BK Mladá Boleslav of the Czech Extraliga (ELH). Jánošík was selected by the Tampa Bay Lightning in the 3rd round (72nd overall) of the 2010 NHL entry draft.

Jánošík made his Czech Extraliga debut playing with HC Bílí Tygři Liberec during the 2012–13 Czech Extraliga season. He made a brief move to the Slovak Extraliga spending the 2014–15 season with HC Košice before returning to Liberec.

On 18 June 2018, Jánošík moved to the KHL in securing a one-year contract with Slovak club, HC Slovan Bratislava, for the 2018–19 season.

Jánošík has a son with his partner Alexandra, who is the daughter of the MP Mária Šofranko.

== Career statistics ==
=== Regular season and playoffs ===
			Regular season					Playoffs
Season	Team	League	GP	G	A	Pts	PIM	GP	G	A	Pts	PIM
2008–09	HC Bílí Tygři Liberec	Czech-Jr.	22	1	8	9	12	—	—	—	—	—
2009–10	Gatineau Olympiques	QMJHL	63	9	26	35	45	10	5	2	7	4
2010–11	Gatineau Olympiques	QMJHL	60	7	25	32	37	24	5	4	9	12
2011–12	Gatineau Olympiques	QMJHL	51	6	26	32	55	4	1	2	3	10
2012–13	HC Bílí Tygři Liberec	Czech	34	0	2	2	28	—	—	—	—	—
2012–13	HC Benátky nad Jizerou	Czech.1	21	4	5	9	33	—	—	—	—	—
2013–14	HC Bílí Tygři Liberec	Czech	5	0	0	0	2	—	—	—	—	—
2013–14	HC Benátky nad Jizerou	Czech.1	27	3	4	7	10	6	0	1	1	4
2014–15	HC Košice	Slovak	56	7	13	20	63	17	3	4	7	14
2015–16	Piráti Chomutov	Czech	40	2	12	14	26	2	1	1	2	6
2016–17	HC Bílí Tygři Liberec	Czech	42	4	5	9	32	16	0	2	2	16
2017–18	HC Bílí Tygři Liberec	Czech	52	6	5	11	58	10	0	3	3	2
2018–19	HC Slovan Bratislava	KHL	56	1	4	5	32	—	—	—	—	—
2019–20	HC Litvínov	Czech	37	5	7	12	22	—	—	—	—	—
2019–20	HC Plzeň	Czech	15	2	3	5	28	—	—	—	—	—
2020–21	IK Oskarshamn	SHL	48	1	6	7	45	—	—	—	—	—
SHL totals			48	1	6	7	45	—	—	—	—	—
Czech totals			225	19	34	53	196	28	1	6	7	24

=== International ===
Year	Team	Event	Result	GP	G	A	Pts	PIM
2009	Slovakia	WJC18	7th	6	1	4	5	2
2011	Slovakia	WJC	8th	6	0	5	5	2
2012	Slovakia	WJC	6th	6	0	1	1	2
2015	Slovakia	WC	9th	6	1	0	1	0
2017	Slovakia	WC	14th	6	0	1	1	0
2018	Slovakia	WC	9th	7	0	0	0	0
2021	Slovakia	WC	8th	8	1	0	1	4
2022	Slovakia	WC	8th	8	0	1	1	0
2023	Slovakia	WC	9th	7	0	0	0	4
Junior totals				18	1	10	11	6
Senior totals				42	2	2	4	8
