= Nižné Repaše =

Village and municipality in Slovakia

- Municipality
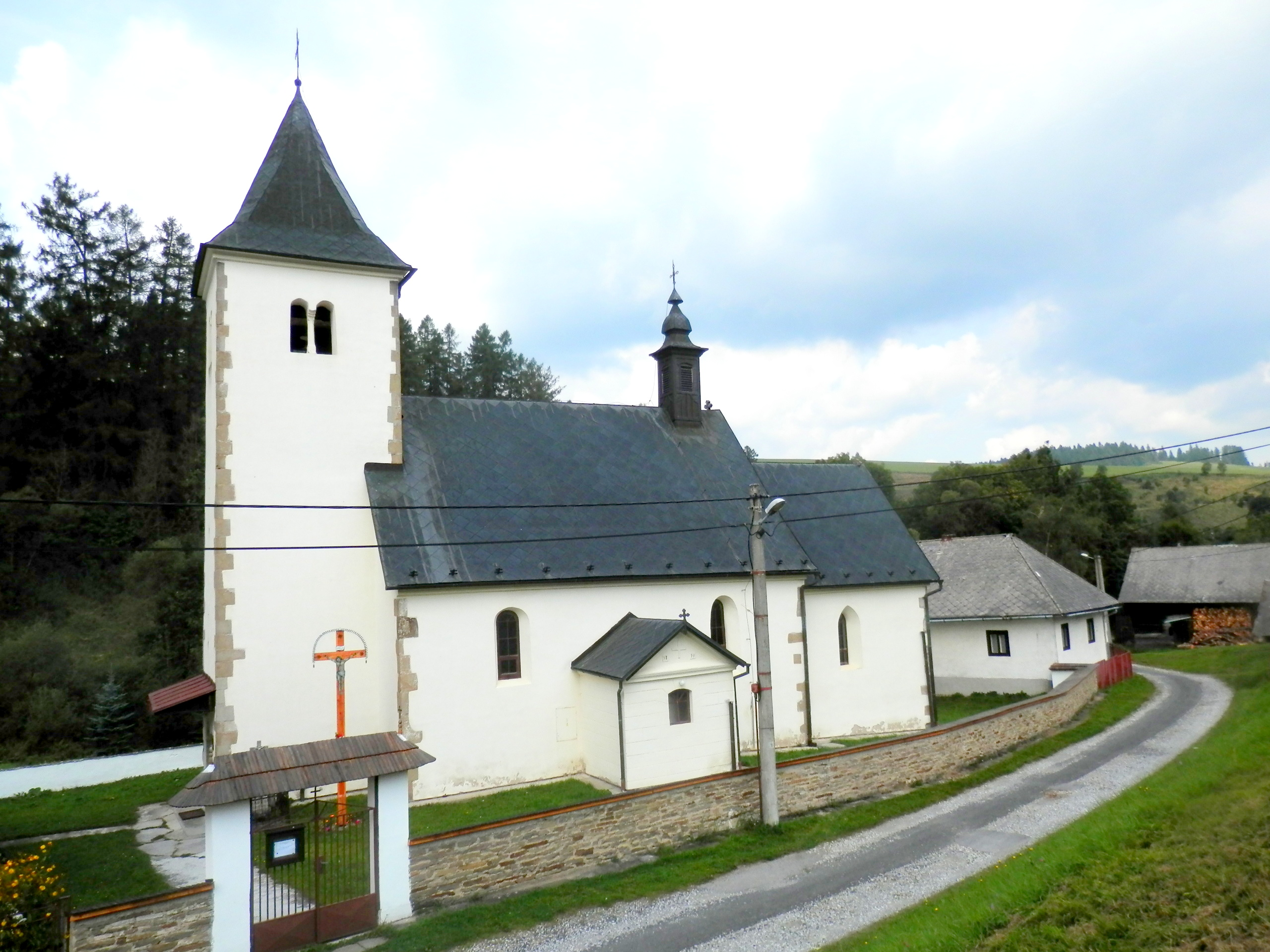

- Flag

- Location of Nižné Repaše in the Prešov Region Location of Nižné Repaše in Slovakia
- Coordinates: 49.08°N 20.72°E
- Country: Slovakia
- Region: Prešov Region
- District: Levoča District
- First mentioned: 1270

Area
  - Total: 8.57 km^{2} (3.31 sq mi)
- Elevation: 746 m (2,448 ft)

Population (2025)
  - Total: 146
- Time zone: UTC+1 (CET)
  - Summer (DST): UTC+2 (CEST)
- Postal code: 537 1
- Area code: +421 53
- Vehicle registration plate (until 2022): LE
- Website: www.niznerepase.dcom.sk

Nižné Repaše (Hungarian: Alsórépás) is a village and municipality in Levoča District in the Prešov Region of central-eastern Slovakia.

== History ==
In historical records the village was first mentioned in 1270.

== Geography ==
The municipality lies at an altitude of 746 metres (2,448 ft) and covers an area of 8.57 km^{2} (3.31 sq mi) (2025).

== Population ==
Population statistic (10 years)
Year	1995	2005	2015	2025
Count	253	207	176	146
Difference		−18.18%	−14.97%	−17.04%

Population statistic
Year	2024	2025
Count	149	146
Difference		−2.01%

It has a population of 146 people (31 December 2025).

=== Ethnicity ===
Census 2021 (1+ %)
Ethnicity	Number	Fraction
Slovak	144	90.56%
Rusyn	76	47.79%
Not found out	10	6.28%
Total	159	

In year 2021 was 159 people by ethnicity 144 as Slovak, 76 as Rusyn, 10 as Not found out, 1 as Canadian and 1 as Other.

Note on population: The difference values of population numbers in the table "Population statistic" and in the sections "Ethnicity" & "Religion" is caused by the use of various statistical methods.

=== Religion ===
Census 2021 (1+ %)
Religion	Number	Fraction
Greek Catholic Church	108	67.92%
Roman Catholic Church	30	18.87%
None	8	5.03%
Eastern Orthodox Church	7	4.4%
Not found out	6	3.77%
Total	159	

In year 2021 was 159 people by religion 108 from Greek Catholic Church, 30 from Roman Catholic Church, 8 from None, 7 from Eastern Orthodox Church and 6 from Not found out.
