= Poľanovce =

Village and municipality in Levoča District in Slovakia

- Municipality
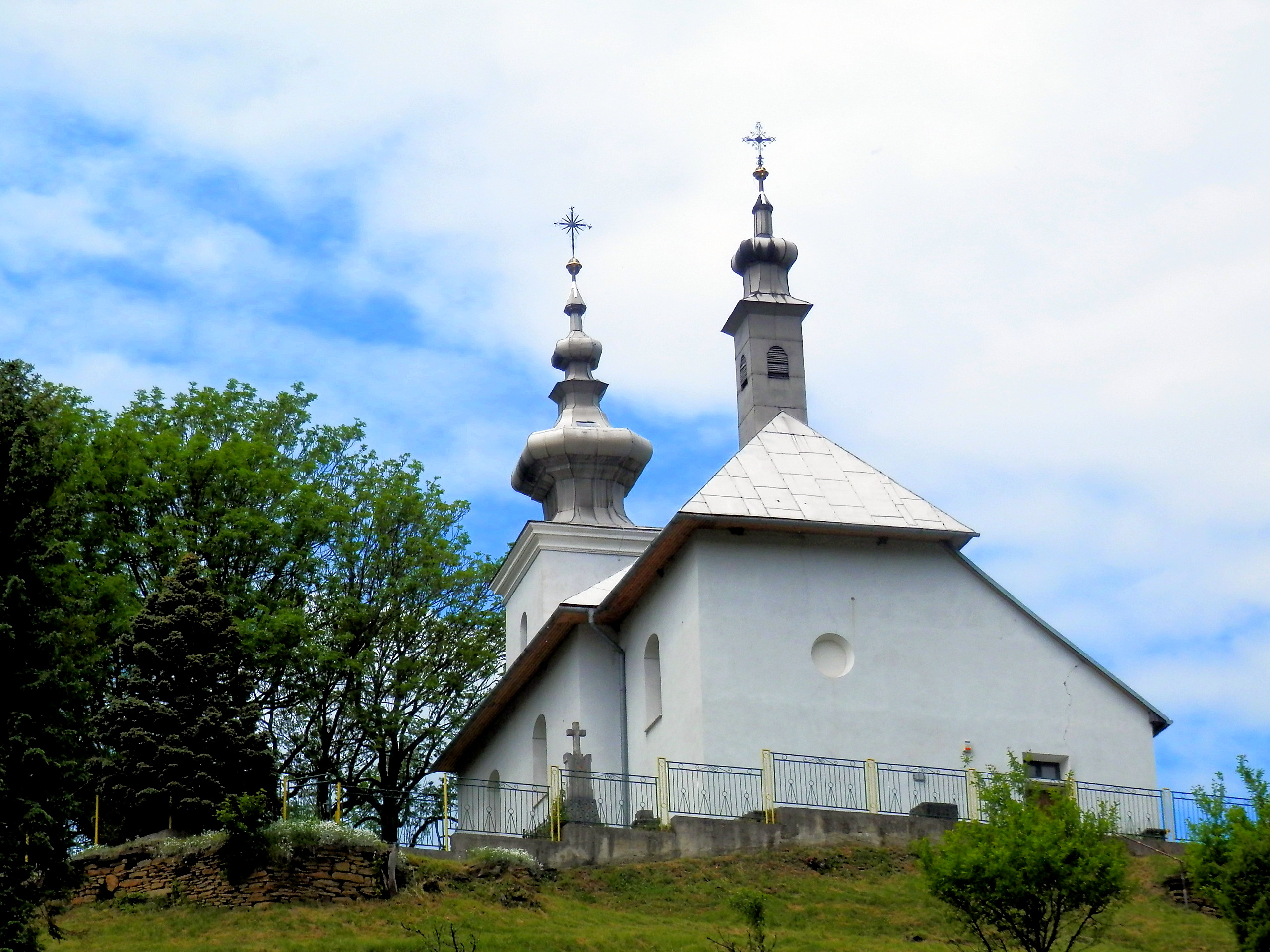

- Flag

- Location of Poľanovce in the Prešov Region Location of Poľanovce in Slovakia
- Coordinates: 49.03°N 20.85°E
- Country: Slovakia
- Region: Prešov Region
- District: Levoča District
- First mentioned: 1270

Area
  - Total: 12.26 km^{2} (4.73 sq mi)
- Elevation: 553 m (1,814 ft)

Population (2025)
  - Total: 164
- Time zone: UTC+1 (CET)
  - Summer (DST): UTC+2 (CEST)
- Postal code: 530 5
- Area code: +421 53
- Vehicle registration plate (until 2022): LE
- Website: polanovce.sk

Poľanovce (Hungarian: Polyánfalu) is a village and municipality in Levoča District in the Prešov Region of central-eastern Slovakia.

== History ==
In historical records the village was first mentioned in 1270.

== Geography ==
The municipality lies at an altitude of 553 metres (1,814 ft) and covers an area of 12.26 km^{2} (4.73 sq mi) (2025).

== Population ==
Population statistic (10 years)
Year	1995	2005	2015	2025
Count	310	177	172	164
Difference		−42.90%	−2.82%	−4.65%

Population statistic
Year	2024	2025
Count	160	164
Difference		+2.5%

It has a population of 164 people (31 December 2025).

=== Ethnicity ===
Census 2021 (1+ %)
Ethnicity	Number	Fraction
Slovak	159	99.37%
Czech	2	1.25%
Rusyn	2	1.25%
Total	160	

In year 2021 was 160 people by ethnicity 159 as Slovak, 2 as Czech, 2 as Rusyn and 1 as Hungarian.

Note on population: The difference values of population numbers in the table "Population statistic" and in the sections "Ethnicity" & "Religion" is caused by the use of various statistical methods.

=== Religion ===
Census 2021 (1+ %)
Religion	Number	Fraction
Roman Catholic Church	147	91.88%
None	5	3.13%
Eastern Orthodox Church	4	2.5%
Greek Catholic Church	2	1.25%
Total	160	

In year 2021 was 160 people by religion 147 from Roman Catholic Church, 5 from None, 4 from Eastern Orthodox Church, 2 from Greek Catholic Church, 1 from Not found out and 1 from Evangelical Church.
