= Dravce =

Village and municipality in Slovakia

- Municipality
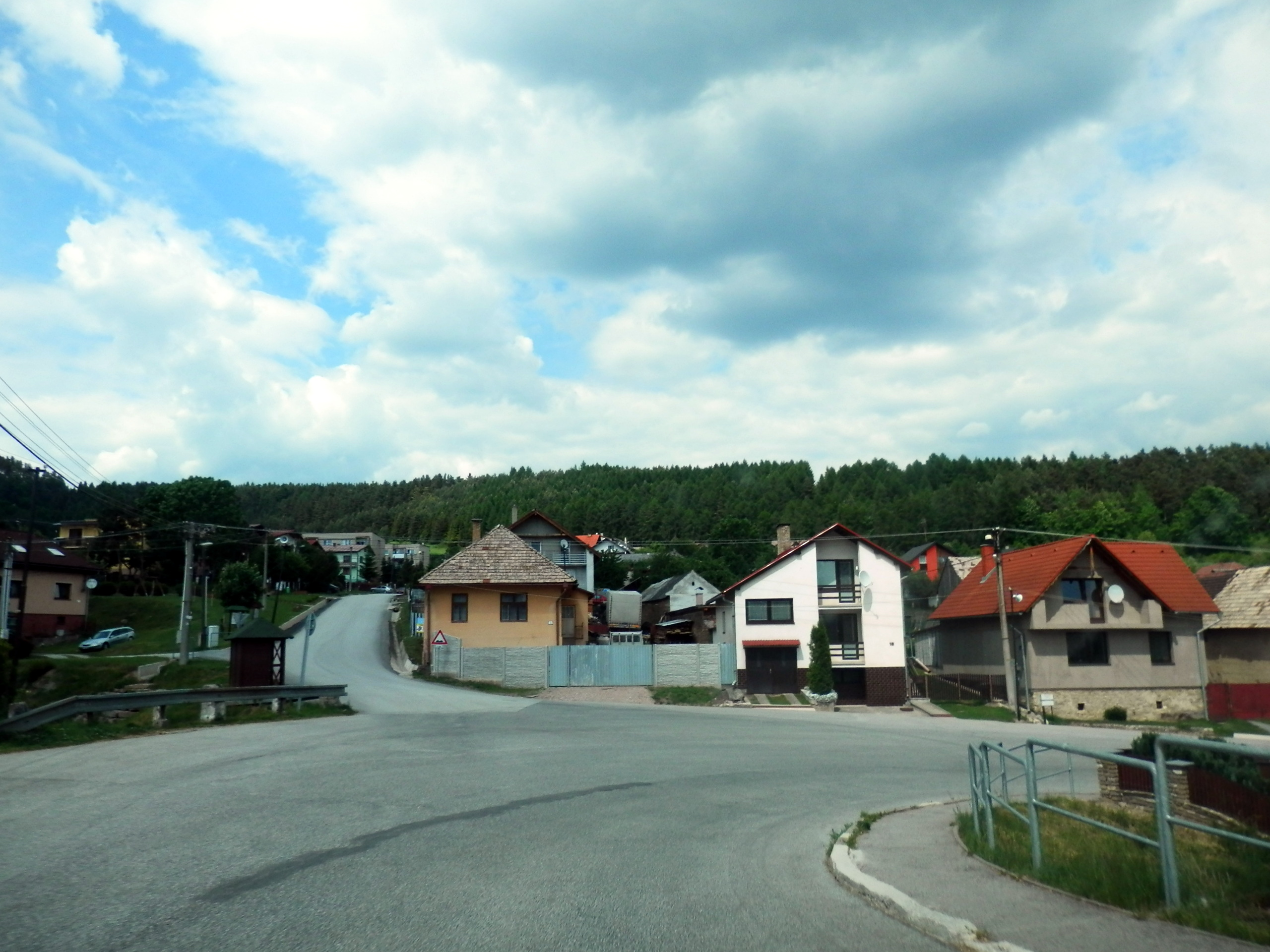

- Flag

- Location of Dravce in the Prešov Region Location of Dravce in Slovakia
- Coordinates: 49.02°N 20.48°E
- Country: Slovakia
- Region: Prešov Region
- District: Levoča District
- First mentioned: 1263

Area
  - Total: 12.95 km^{2} (5.00 sq mi)
- Elevation: 680 m (2,230 ft)

Population (2025)
  - Total: 849
- Time zone: UTC+1 (CET)
  - Summer (DST): UTC+2 (CEST)
- Postal code: 531 4
- Area code: +421 53
- Vehicle registration plate (until 2022): LE
- Website: www.obecdravce.sk

Dravce (Hungarian: Szepesdaróc) is a village and municipality in Levoča District in the Prešov Region of central-eastern Slovakia.

== History ==
In historical records the village was first mentioned in 1263.

== Geography ==
The municipality lies at an altitude of 680 metres (2,230 ft) and covers an area of 12.95 km^{2} (5.00 sq mi) (2025).

== Population ==
Population statistic (10 years)
Year	1995	2005	2015	2025
Count	746	770	821	849
Difference		+3.21%	+6.62%	+3.41%

Population statistic
Year	2024	2025
Count	844	849
Difference		+0.59%

It has a population of 849 people (31 December 2025).

=== Ethnicity ===
Census 2021 (1+ %)
Ethnicity	Number	Fraction
Slovak	754	93.2%
Not found out	53	6.55%
Romani	9	1.11%
Total	809	

In year 2021 was 809 people by ethnicity 754 as Slovak, 53 as Not found out, 9 as Romani, 2 as Czech, 2 as Rusyn, 1 as Ukrainian, 1 as Polish and 1 as Other.

Note on population: The difference values of population numbers in the table "Population statistic" and in the sections "Ethnicity" & "Religion" is caused by the use of various statistical methods.

=== Religion ===
Census 2021 (1+ %)
Religion	Number	Fraction
Roman Catholic Church	693	85.66%
Not found out	51	6.3%
None	40	4.94%
Greek Catholic Church	9	1.11%
Total	809	

In year 2021 was 809 people by religion 693 from Roman Catholic Church, 51 from Not found out, 40 from None, 9 from Greek Catholic Church, 8 from Evangelical Church, 4 from Seventh-day Adventist Church, 1 from Eastern Orthodox Church, 1 from Christian Congregations in Slovakia, 1 from Buddhism and 1 from Ad hoc movements.

== Genealogical resources ==
The records for genealogical research are available at the state archive "Statny Archiv in Levoca, Slovakia"

- Roman Catholic church records (births/marriages/deaths): 1673-1897 (parish B)

== See also ==
- List of municipalities and towns in Slovakia
