= Korytné =

- Municipality
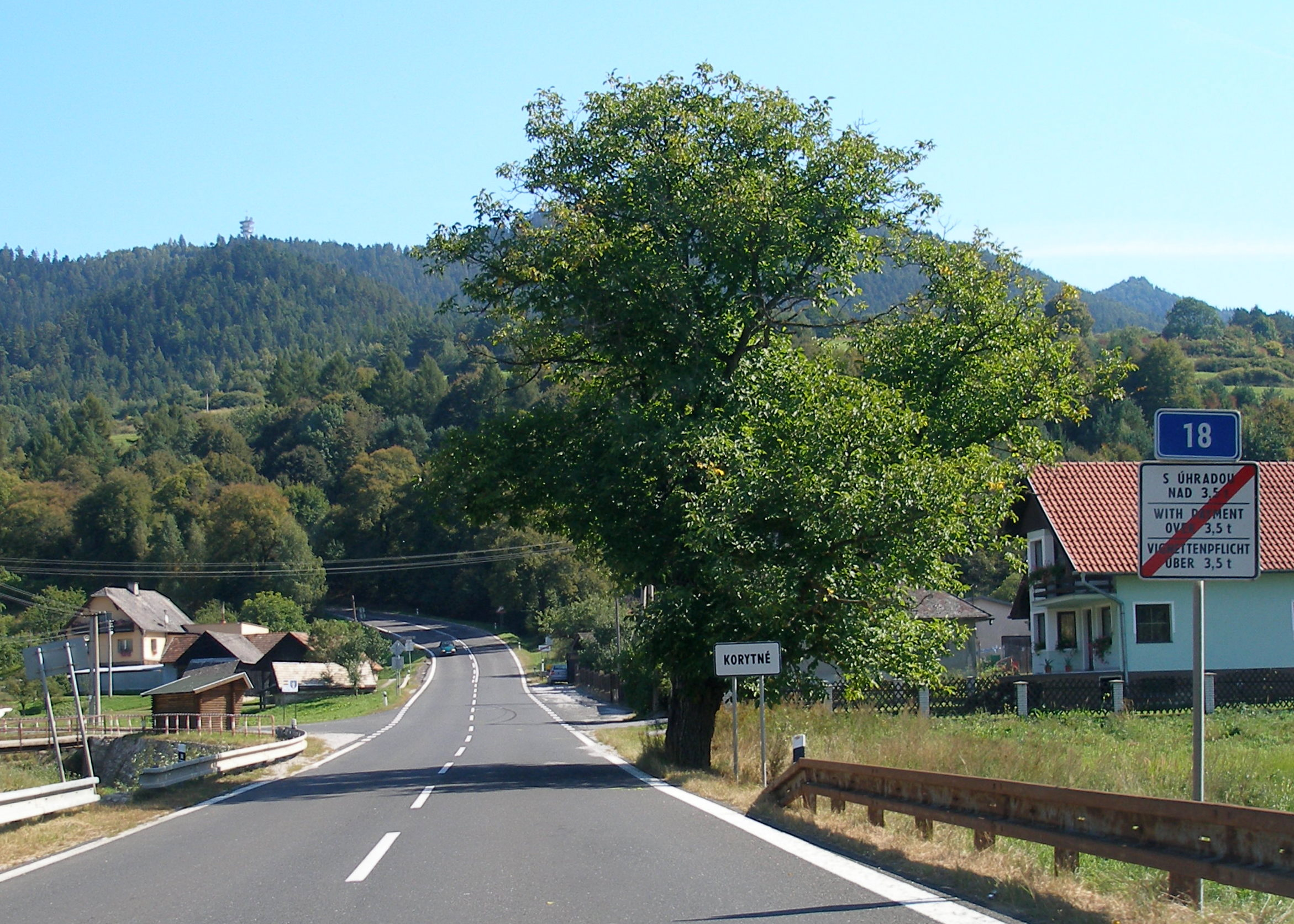

- Flag

- Location of Korytné in the Prešov Region Location of Korytné in Slovakia
- Coordinates: 49.01°N 20.84°E
- Country: Slovakia
- Region: Prešov Region
- District: Levoča District
- First mentioned: 1297

Area
  - Total: 4.39 km^{2} (1.69 sq mi)
- Elevation: 509 m (1,670 ft)

Population (2025)
  - Total: 103
- Time zone: UTC+1 (CET)
  - Summer (DST): UTC+2 (CEST)
- Postal code: 530 5
- Area code: +421 53
- Vehicle registration plate (until 2022): LE

Korytné (Hungarian: Korotnok) is a village and municipality in Levoča District in the Prešov Region of central-eastern Slovakia.

== Geography ==
The municipality lies at an altitude of 509 metres (1,670 ft) and covers an area of 4.39 km^{2} (1.69 sq mi) (2025).

== History ==
In historical records the village was first mentioned in 1297.

== Population ==
Population statistic (10 years)
Year	1995	2005	2015	2025
Count	0	112	90	103
Difference		–	−19.64%	+14.44%

Population statistic
Year	2024	2025
Count	98	103
Difference		+5.10%

It has a population of 103 people (31 December 2025).

=== Ethnicity ===
Census 2021 (1+ %)
Ethnicity	Number	Fraction
Slovak	87	97.75%
Not found out	4	4.49%
Rusyn	1	1.12%
Hungarian	1	1.12%
Total	89	

In year 2021 was 89 people by ethnicity 87 as Slovak, 4 as Not found out, 1 as Rusyn and 1 as Hungarian.

Note on population: The difference values of population numbers in the table "Population statistic" and in the sections "Ethnicity" & "Religion" is caused by the use of various statistical methods.

=== Religion ===
Census 2021 (1+ %)
Religion	Number	Fraction
Roman Catholic Church	80	89.89%
None	5	5.62%
Greek Catholic Church	2	2.25%
Not found out	1	1.12%
Christian Congregations in Slovakia	1	1.12%
Total	89	

In year 2021 was 89 people by religion 80 from Roman Catholic Church, 5 from None, 2 from Greek Catholic Church, 1 from Not found out and 1 from Christian Congregations in Slovakia.

== Genealogical resources ==
The records for genealogical research are available at the state archive "Statny Archiv in Levoca, Slovakia"

- Roman Catholic church records (births/marriages/deaths): 1669-1898 (parish B)

== See also ==
- List of municipalities and towns in Slovakia
