= Baldovce =

Village and municipality in Slovakia

- Municipality
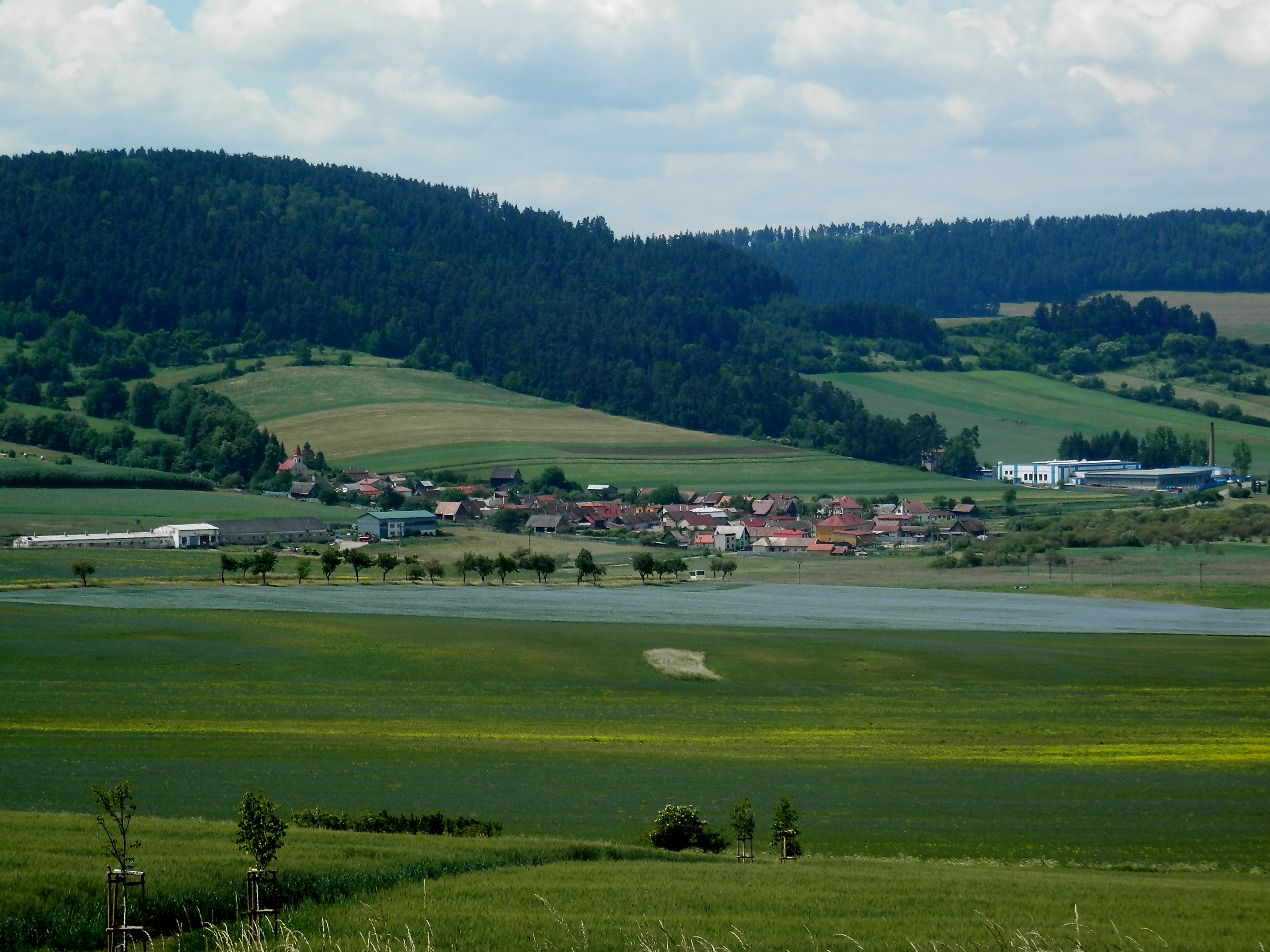

- Flag

- Location of Baldovce in the Prešov Region Location of Baldovce in Slovakia
- Coordinates: 48.98°N 20.72°E
- Country: Slovakia
- Region: Prešov Region
- District: Levoča District
- First mentioned: 1272

Area
  - Total: 2.20 km^{2} (0.85 sq mi)
- Elevation: 430 m (1,410 ft)

Population (2025)
  - Total: 162
- Time zone: UTC+1 (CET)
  - Summer (DST): UTC+2 (CEST)
- Postal code: 530 4
- Area code: +421 53
- Vehicle registration plate (until 2022): LE

Baldovce (Hungarian: Baldóc) is a village and municipality in the Levoča District in the Prešov Region of central-eastern Slovakia. In historical records the village was first mentioned in 1272. The municipality lies at an altitude of 430 meters and covers an area of 2.20 km^{2} (0.85 sq mi) (2025-06-30/-07-01).

== Geography ==
The municipality lies at an altitude of 430 metres (1,410 ft) and covers an area of 2.20 km^{2} (0.85 sq mi) (2025).

== Population ==
Population statistic (10 years)
Year	1995	2005	2015	2025
Count	215	201	182	162
Difference		−6.51%	−9.45%	−10.98%

Population statistic
Year	2024	2025
Count	159	162
Difference		+1.88%

It has a population of 162 people (31 December 2025).

=== Ethnicity ===
Census 2021 (1+ %)
Ethnicity	Number	Fraction
Slovak	167	97.09%
Not found out	5	2.9%
Total	172	

In year 2021 was 172 people by ethnicity 167 as Slovak, 5 as Not found out and 1 as Czech.

Note on population: The difference values of population numbers in the table "Population statistic" and in the sections "Ethnicity" & "Religion" is caused by the use of various statistical methods.

=== Religion ===
Census 2021 (1+ %)
Religion	Number	Fraction
Roman Catholic Church	147	85.47%
None	19	11.05%
Not found out	6	3.49%
Total	172	

In year 2021 was 172 people by religion 147 from Roman Catholic Church, 19 from None and 6 from Not found out.

== Genealogical resources ==
The records for genealogical research are available at the Spiš archive in Levoča (Slovak: Spišský archív v Levoči).

- Roman Catholic church records (births/marriages/deaths): 1653-1895
- Greek Catholic church records (births/marriages/deaths): 1825-1950
- Census records 1869 of Baldovce are available at the state archive.

== See also ==
- List of municipalities and towns in Slovakia
