= Brutovce =

- Municipality
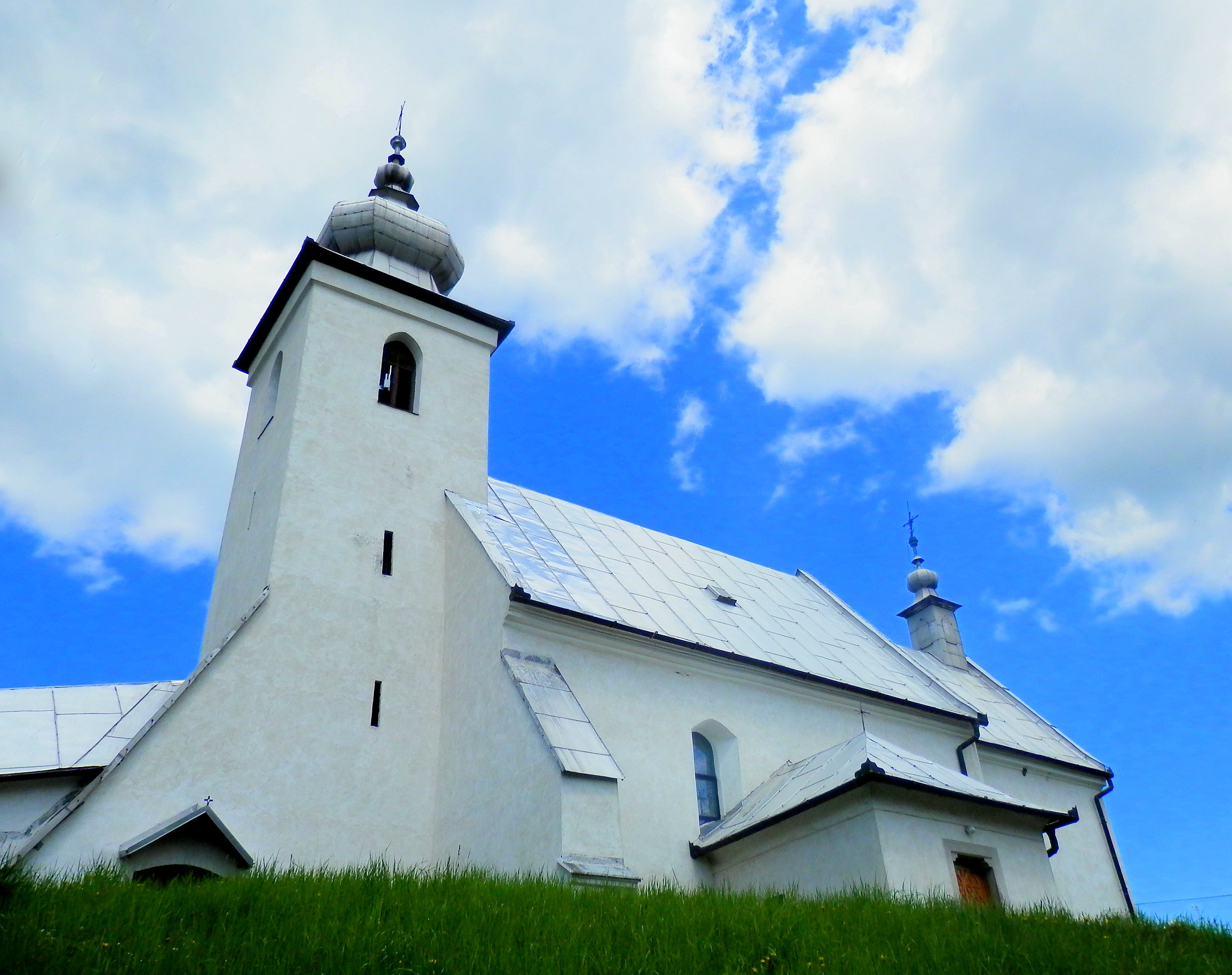
- A Church in Brutovce

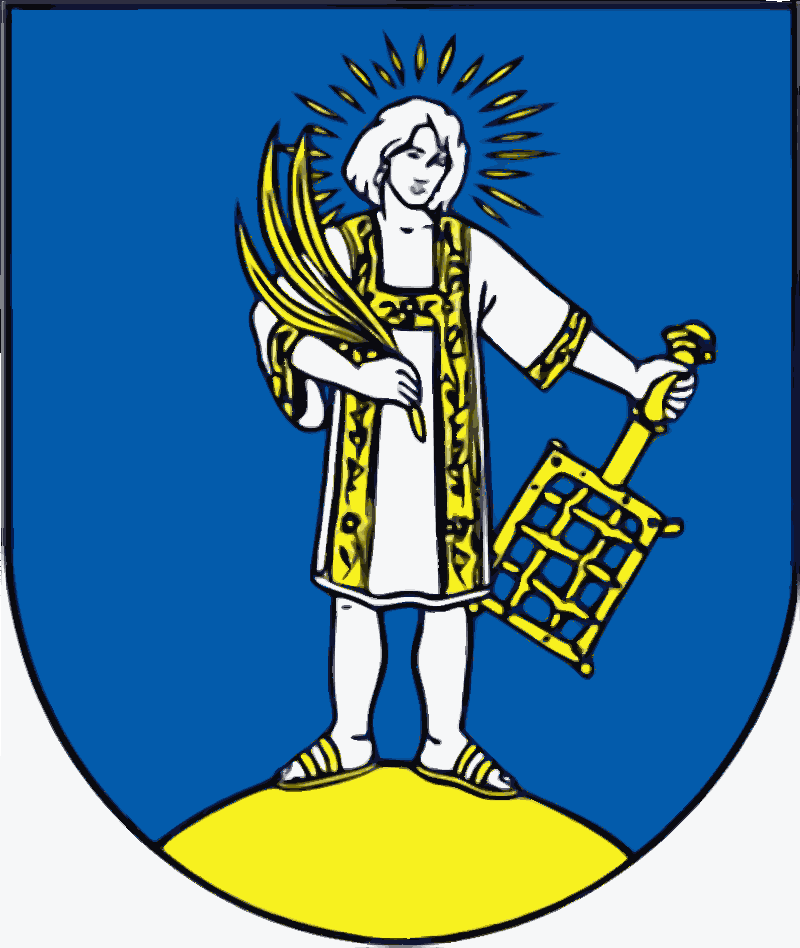
- Flag Coat of arms

- Location of Brutovce in the Prešov Region Location of Brutovce in Slovakia
- Coordinates: 49.08°N 20.78°E
- Country: Slovakia
- Region: Prešov Region
- District: Levoča District
- First mentioned: 1319

Area
  - Total: 13.68 km^{2} (5.28 sq mi)
- Elevation: 864 m (2,835 ft)

Population (2025)
  - Total: 138
- Time zone: UTC+1 (CET)
  - Summer (DST): UTC+2 (CEST)
- Postal code: 537 3
- Area code: +421 53
- Vehicle registration plate (until 2022): LE
- Website: www.brutovce.sk

Brutovce is a village and municipality in Levoča District in the Prešov Region of central-eastern Slovakia.

== History ==
In historical records the village was first mentioned in 1319.

== Geography ==
The municipality lies at an altitude of 864 metres (2,835 ft) and covers an area of 13.68 km^{2} (5.28 sq mi) (2025).

== Population ==
Population statistic (10 years)
Year	1995	2005	2015	2025
Count	238	206	187	138
Difference		−13.44%	−9.22%	−26.20%

Population statistic
Year	2024	2025
Count	144	138
Difference		−4.16%

It has a population of 138 people (31 December 2025).

=== Ethnicity ===
Census 2021 (1+ %)
Ethnicity	Number	Fraction
Slovak	147	98%
Rusyn	4	2.66%
Czech	3	2%
Romani	2	1.33%
Not found out	2	1.33%
Total	150	

In year 2021 was 150 people by ethnicity 147 as Slovak, 4 as Rusyn, 3 as Czech, 2 as Romani and 2 as Not found out.

Note on population: The difference values of population numbers in the table "Population statistic" and in the sections "Ethnicity" & "Religion" is caused by the use of various statistical methods.

=== Religion ===
Census 2021 (1+ %)
Religion	Number	Fraction
Roman Catholic Church	134	89.33%
Greek Catholic Church	5	3.33%
None	5	3.33%
Christian Congregations in Slovakia	4	2.67%
Not found out	2	1.33%
Total	150	

In year 2021 was 150 people by religion 134 from Roman Catholic Church, 5 from Greek Catholic Church, 5 from None, 4 from Christian Congregations in Slovakia and 2 from Not found out.

== Genealogical resources ==
The records for genealogical research are available at the state archive "Statny Archiv in Levoca, Slovakia"

- Roman Catholic church records (births/marriages/deaths): 1653-1896 (parish A)
- Greek Catholic church records (births/marriages/deaths): 1746-1929 (parish B)

== See also ==
- List of municipalities and towns in Slovakia
