= Levoča District =

Coordinates: 49°1′34″N 20°35′20″E

- District
- Country: Slovakia
- Region (kraj): Prešov Region
- Seat: Levoča

Area
  - Total: 421.00 km^{2} (162.55 sq mi)

Population (2025)
  - Total: 33,305
- Time zone: UTC+1 (CET)
  - Summer (DST): UTC+2 (CEST)
- Telephone prefix: 053
- Vehicle registration plate (until 2022): LE
- Municipalities: 33

Levoča District (okres Levoča) is a district in the Prešov Region of eastern Slovakia.

Until 1918, the district was part of Spiš County, a county of the Kingdom of Hungary.

== Population ==
Population statistic (10 years)
Year	1995	2005	2015	2025
Count	30,516	32,377	33,396	33,305
Difference		+6.09%	+3.14%	−0.27%

Population statistic
Year	2024	2025
Count	33,310	33,305
Difference		−0.01%

It has a population of 33,305 people (31 December 2025).

Historical population
Year	Pop.	±%
1970	27,922	—
1980	28,763	+3.0%
1991	29,298	+1.9%
2001	31,880	+8.8%
2011	33,262	+4.3%
2021	33,107	−0.5%
Source: Statistical Office of the Slovak Republic

=== Ethnicity ===
Census 2021 (1+ %)
Ethnicity	Number	Fraction
Slovak	30,677	85.52%
Romani	2713	7.56%
Not found out	1321	3.68%
Rusyn	778	2.16%
Total	35,867	

In year 2021 was 35,867 people by ethnicity 30,677 as Slovak, 2713 as Romani, 1321 as Not found out, 778 as Rusyn, 125 as Czech, 49 as Other, 44 as Hungarian, 29 as Russian, 22 as German, 21 as Polish, 15 as Ukrainian, 11 as Canadian, 10 as Chinese, 7 as Greek, 6 as French, 5 as Irish, 5 as Austrian, 4 as Jewish, 4 as English, 3 as Turkish, 3 as Romanian, 3 as Bulgarian, 3 as Albanian, 2 as Vietnamese, 2 as Italian, 2 as Serbian, 2 as Moravian and 1 as Silesian.

Note on population: The difference values of population numbers in the table "Population statistic" and in the sections "Ethnicity" & "Religion" is caused by the use of various statistical methods.

=== Religion ===
Census 2021 (1+ %)
Religion	Number	Fraction
Roman Catholic Church	24,911	75.24%
None	3637	10.99%
Not found out	1726	5.21%
Greek Catholic Church	1540	4.65%
Christian Congregations in Slovakia	412	1.24%
Evangelical Church	361	1.09%
Total	33,107	

In year 2021 was 33,107 people by religion 24,911 from Roman Catholic Church, 3637 from None, 1726 from Not found out, 1540 from Greek Catholic Church, 412 from Christian Congregations in Slovakia, 361 from Evangelical Church, 166 from Jehovah's Witnesses, 103 from Eastern Orthodox Church, 59 from Ad hoc movements, 42 from Other, 33 from Other and not ascertained christian church, 26 from Calvinist Church, 16 from Buddhism, 14 from Paganism and natural spirituality, 13 from Apostolic Church, 12 from Seventh-day Adventist Church, 9 from Islam, 7 from United Methodist Church, 4 from Old Catholic Church, 4 from Czechoslovak Hussite Church, 3 from Jewish community, 3 from Hinduism, 3 from Church of Jesus Christ of Latter-day Saints, 1 from Church of the Brethren, 1 from Baptists Church and 1 from Bahá'i Community.

== Municipalities ==
Municipality	Area [km^{2}]	Population
Baldovce	2.20	162
Beharovce	2.64	183
Bijacovce	16.59	968
Brutovce	13.68	138
Buglovce	3.03	271
Dlhé Stráže	3.37	615
Doľany	3.67	941
Domaňovce	12.83	914
Dravce	12.95	849
Dúbrava	9.60	339
Granč-Petrovce	3.16	688
Harakovce	5.27	54
Jablonov	20.53	990
Klčov	7.33	674
Korytné	4.39	103
Kurimany	2.58	386
Levoča	64.04	13,779
Lúčka	3.93	115
Nemešany	4.00	507
Nižné Repaše	8.57	146
Oľšavica	17.60	236
Ordzovany	12.07	164
Pavľany	7.70	46
Poľanovce	12.26	164
Pongrácovce	2.98	137
Spišské Podhradie	24.94	3,715
Spišský Hrhov	12.22	1,934
Spišský Štvrtok	14.23	2,600
Studenec	8.30	566
Torysky	6.98	318
Uloža	6.83	258
Vyšné Repaše	9.45	90
Vyšný Slavkov	17.18	255

Population and area values are current for year 2025.
