= Nemešany =

Village and municipality in Slovakia

- Municipality
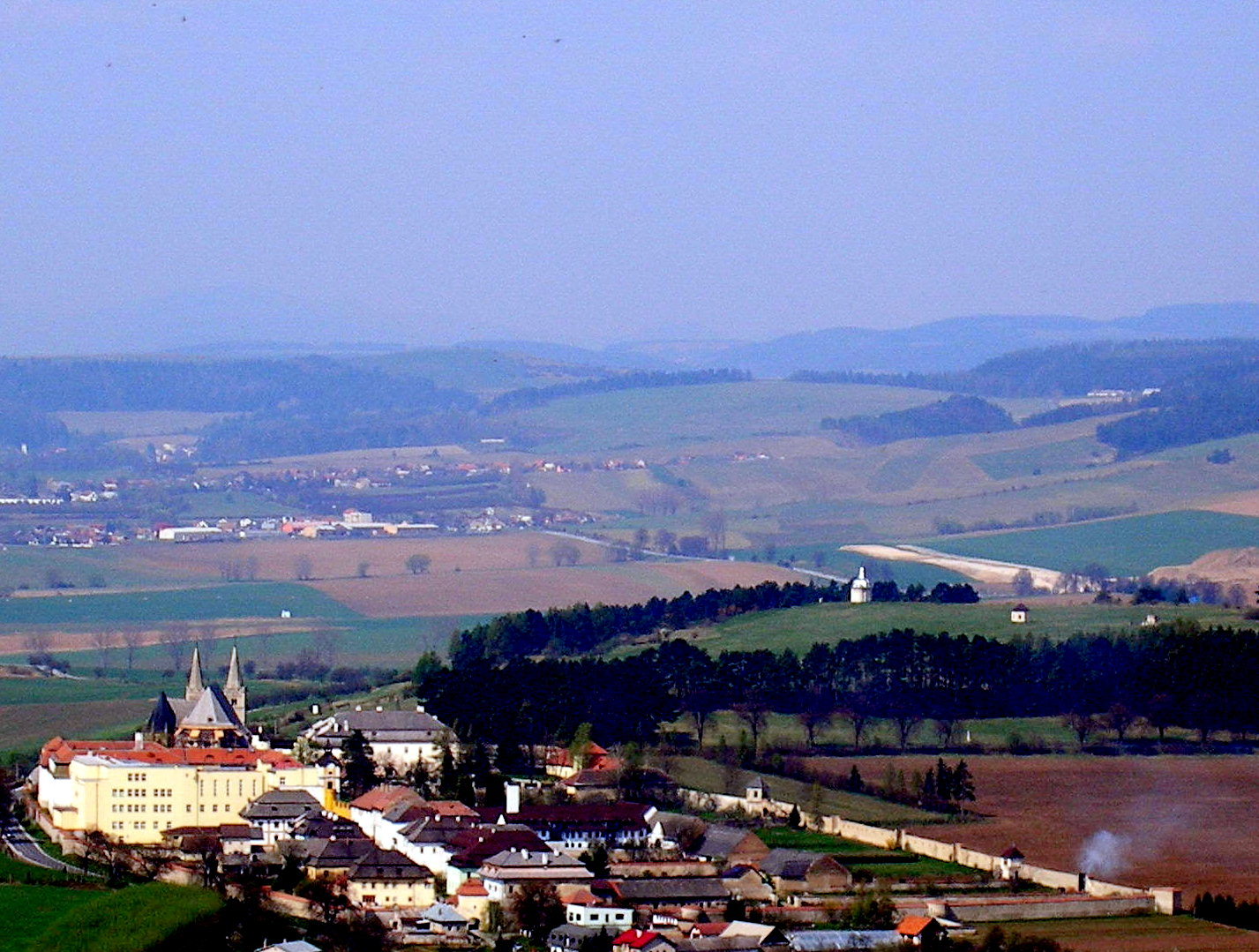

- Flag

- Location of Nemešany in the Prešov Region Location of Nemešany in Slovakia
- Coordinates: 49.00°N 20.68°E
- Country: Slovakia
- Region: Prešov Region
- District: Levoča District
- First mentioned: 1570

Area
  - Total: 4.00 km^{2} (1.54 sq mi)
- Elevation: 462 m (1,516 ft)

Population (2025)
  - Total: 507
- Time zone: UTC+1 (CET)
  - Summer (DST): UTC+2 (CEST)
- Postal code: 530 2
- Area code: +421 53
- Vehicle registration plate (until 2022): LE
- Website: obecnemesany.sk

Nemešany (Hungarian: Nemessány) is a village and municipality in Levoča District in the Prešov Region of central-eastern Slovakia.

== History ==
In historical records the village was first mentioned in 1570.

== Geography ==
The municipality lies at an altitude of 462 metres (1,516 ft) and covers an area of 4.00 km^{2} (1.54 sq mi) (2025).

== Population ==
Population statistic (10 years)
Year	1995	2005	2015	2025
Count	333	358	413	507
Difference		+7.50%	+15.36%	+22.76%

Population statistic
Year	2024	2025
Count	504	507
Difference		+0.59%

It has a population of 507 people (31 December 2025).

=== Ethnicity ===
Census 2021 (1+ %)
Ethnicity	Number	Fraction
Slovak	417	98.81%
Rusyn	5	1.18%
Not found out	5	1.18%
Total	422	

In year 2021 was 422 people by ethnicity 417 as Slovak, 5 as Rusyn, 5 as Not found out and 1 as Czech.

Note on population: The difference values of population numbers in the table "Population statistic" and in the sections "Ethnicity" & "Religion" is caused by the use of various statistical methods.

=== Religion ===
Census 2021 (1+ %)
Religion	Number	Fraction
Roman Catholic Church	395	93.6%
None	13	3.08%
Not found out	6	1.42%
Greek Catholic Church	6	1.42%
Total	422	

In year 2021 was 422 people by religion 395 from Roman Catholic Church, 13 from None, 6 from Not found out, 6 from Greek Catholic Church, 1 from Jehovah's Witnesses and 1 from Christian Congregations in Slovakia.
