= Jablonov =

Village and municipality in Levoča District in Slovakia

- Municipality
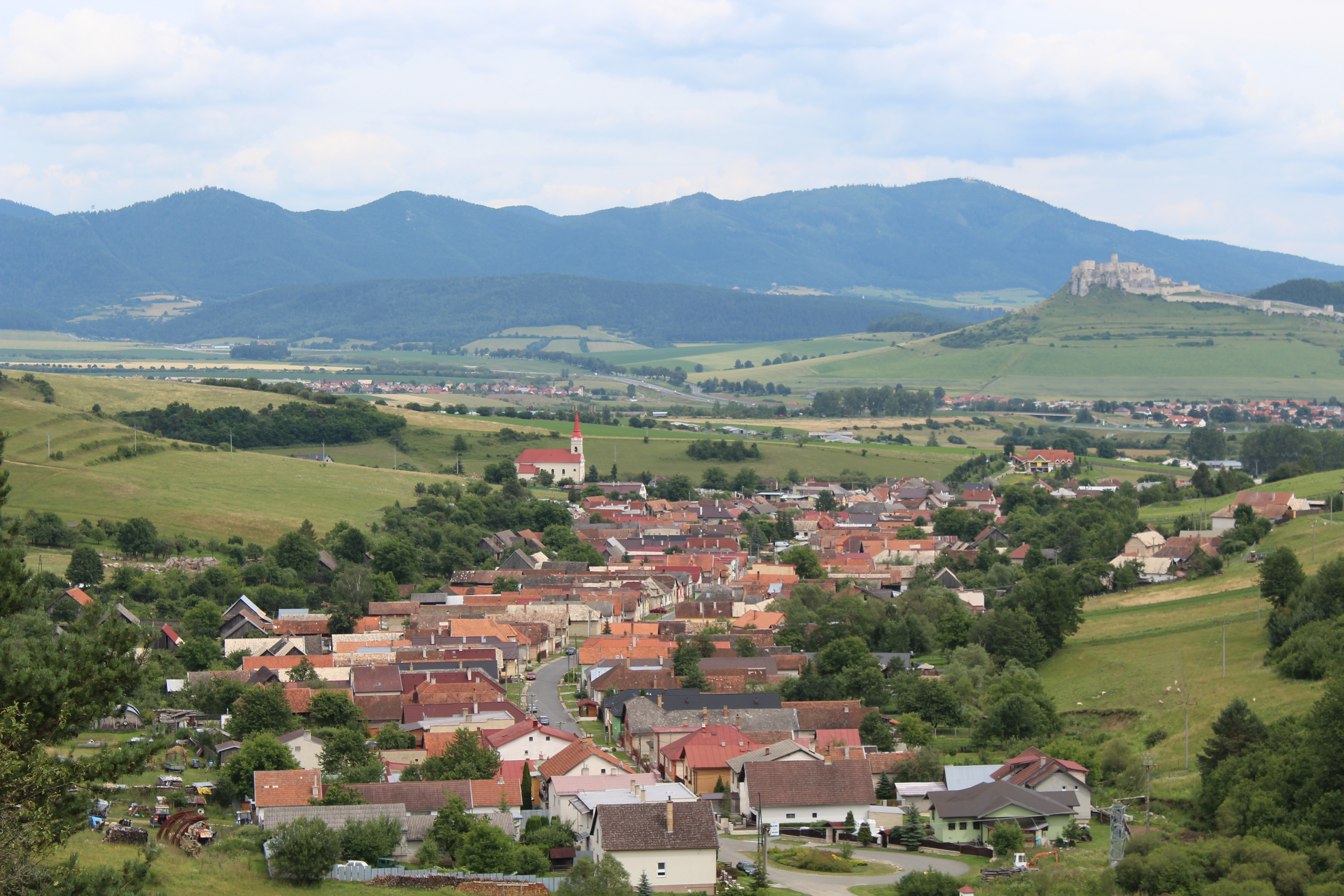

- Flag

- Location of Jablonov in the Prešov Region Location of Jablonov in Slovakia
- Coordinates: 49.02°N 20.73°E
- Country: Slovakia
- Region: Prešov Region
- District: Levoča District
- First mentioned: 1235

Area
  - Total: 20.53 km^{2} (7.93 sq mi)
- Elevation: 482 m (1,581 ft)

Population (2025)
  - Total: 990
- Time zone: UTC+1 (CET)
  - Summer (DST): UTC+2 (CEST)
- Postal code: 530 3
- Area code: +421 53
- Vehicle registration plate (until 2022): LE
- Website: www.jablonov.sk

Jablonov (Hungarian: Szepesalmás) is a village and municipality in Levoča District in the Prešov Region of central-eastern Slovakia.

== History ==
In historical records the village was first mentioned in 1249. In village is Roman Catholic Church of st. Mary Magdalene.

== Geography ==
The municipality lies at an altitude of 482 metres (1,581 ft) and covers an area of 20.53 km^{2} (7.93 sq mi) (2025).

== Population ==
Population statistic (10 years)
Year	1995	2005	2015	2025
Count	924	1001	1002	990
Difference		+8.33%	+0.09%	−1.19%

Population statistic
Year	2024	2025
Count	982	990
Difference		+0.81%

It has a population of 990 people (31 December 2025).

=== Ethnicity ===
Census 2021 (1+ %)
Ethnicity	Number	Fraction
Slovak	806	81.66%
Not found out	139	14.08%
Romani	57	5.77%
Total	987	

In year 2021 was 987 people by ethnicity 806 as Slovak, 139 as Not found out, 57 as Romani, 3 as Rusyn and 1 as Hungarian.

Note on population: The difference values of population numbers in the table "Population statistic" and in the sections "Ethnicity" & "Religion" is caused by the use of various statistical methods.

=== Religion ===
Census 2021 (1+ %)
Religion	Number	Fraction
Roman Catholic Church	731	74.06%
Not found out	131	13.27%
Jehovah's Witnesses	45	4.56%
None	35	3.55%
Christian Congregations in Slovakia	20	2.03%
Greek Catholic Church	16	1.62%
Total	987	

In year 2021 was 987 people by religion 731 from Roman Catholic Church, 131 from Not found out, 45 from Jehovah's Witnesses, 35 from None, 20 from Christian Congregations in Slovakia, 16 from Greek Catholic Church, 5 from Evangelical Church, 3 from Calvinist Church and 1 from Church of the Brethren.

== Genealogical resources ==
The records for genealogical research are available at the state archive "Statny Archiv in Levoca, Slovakia"

- Roman Catholic church records (births/marriages/deaths): 1653-1747 (parish B)

== See also ==
- List of municipalities and towns in Slovakia
