= Studenec (Levoča District) =

Village and municipality in Slovakia

- Municipality
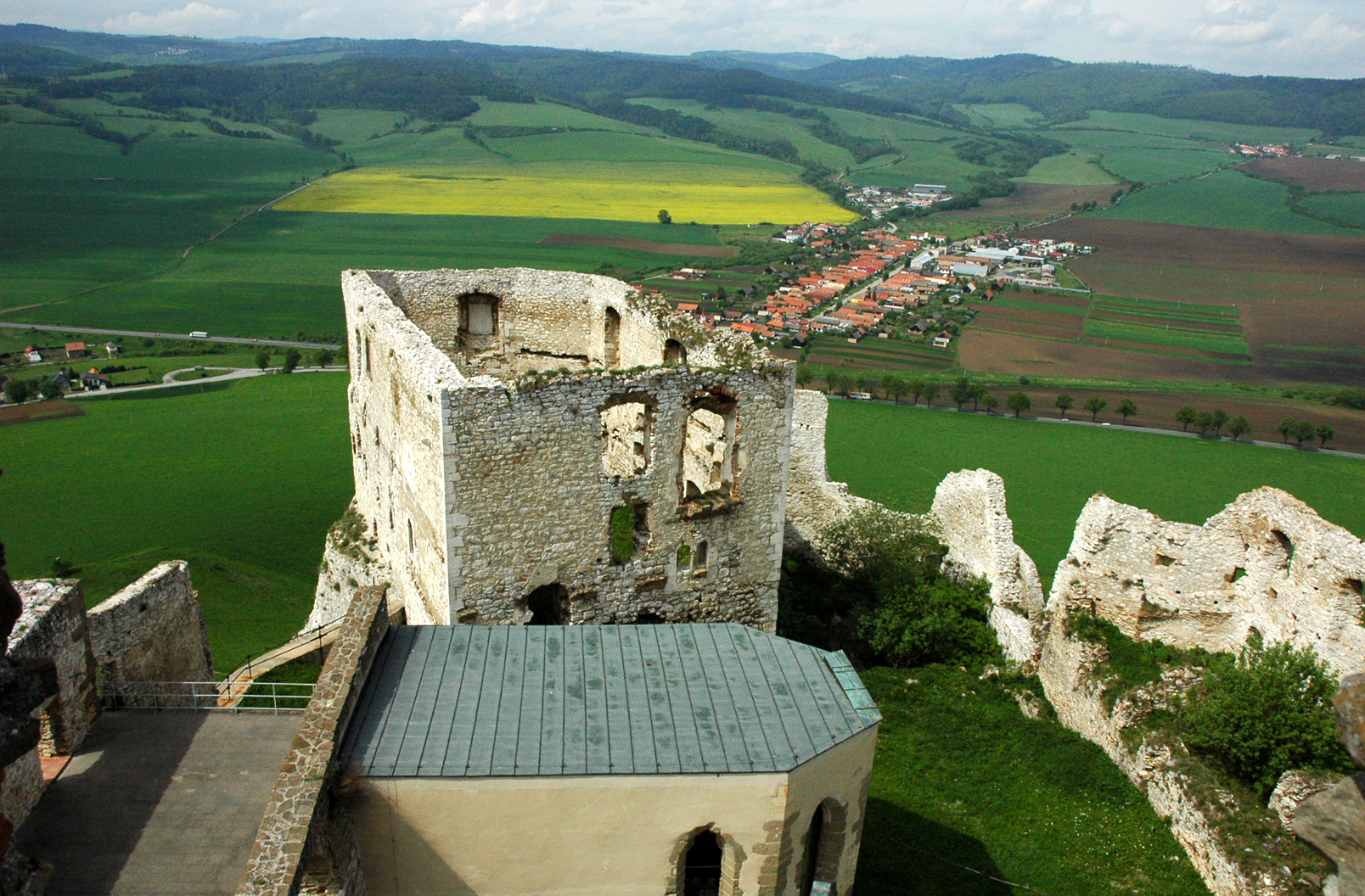

- Flag

- Location of Studenec in the Prešov Region Location of Studenec in Slovakia
- Coordinates: 49°01′N 20°46′E
- Country: Slovakia
- Region: Prešov Region
- District: Levoča District
- First mentioned: 1264

Area
  - Total: 8.30 km^{2} (3.20 sq mi)
- Elevation: 463 m (1,519 ft)

Population (2025)
  - Total: 566
- Time zone: UTC+1 (CET)
  - Summer (DST): UTC+2 (CEST)
- Postal code: 530 4
- Area code: +421 53
- Vehicle registration plate (until 2022): LE
- Website: obecstudenec.sk

Studenec (Hungarian: Hidegpatak) is a village and municipality in Levoča District in the Prešov Region of central-eastern Slovakia.

== History ==
In historical records the village was first mentioned in 1264.

== Geography ==
The municipality lies at an altitude of 463 metres (1,519 ft) and covers an area of 8.30 km^{2} (3.20 sq mi) (2025).

== Population ==
Population statistic (10 years)
Year	1995	2005	2015	2025
Count	483	498	482	566
Difference		+3.10%	−3.21%	+17.42%

Population statistic
Year	2024	2025
Count	540	566
Difference		+4.81%

It has a population of 566 people (31 December 2025).

=== Ethnicity ===
Census 2021 (1+ %)
Ethnicity	Number	Fraction
Slovak	464	96.26%
Not found out	19	3.94%
Total	482	

In year 2021 was 482 people by ethnicity 464 as Slovak, 19 as Not found out, 3 as Czech, 2 as Other, 2 as Greek and 1 as Rusyn.

Note on population: The difference values of population numbers in the table "Population statistic" and in the sections "Ethnicity" & "Religion" is caused by the use of various statistical methods.

=== Religion ===
Census 2021 (1+ %)
Religion	Number	Fraction
Roman Catholic Church	423	87.76%
None	32	6.64%
Not found out	17	3.53%
Greek Catholic Church	9	1.87%
Total	482	

In year 2021 was 482 people by religion 423 from Roman Catholic Church, 32 from None, 17 from Not found out, 9 from Greek Catholic Church and 1 from Evangelical Church.
