= Vyšné Repaše =

Village and municipality in Levoča District in Slovakia

- Municipality
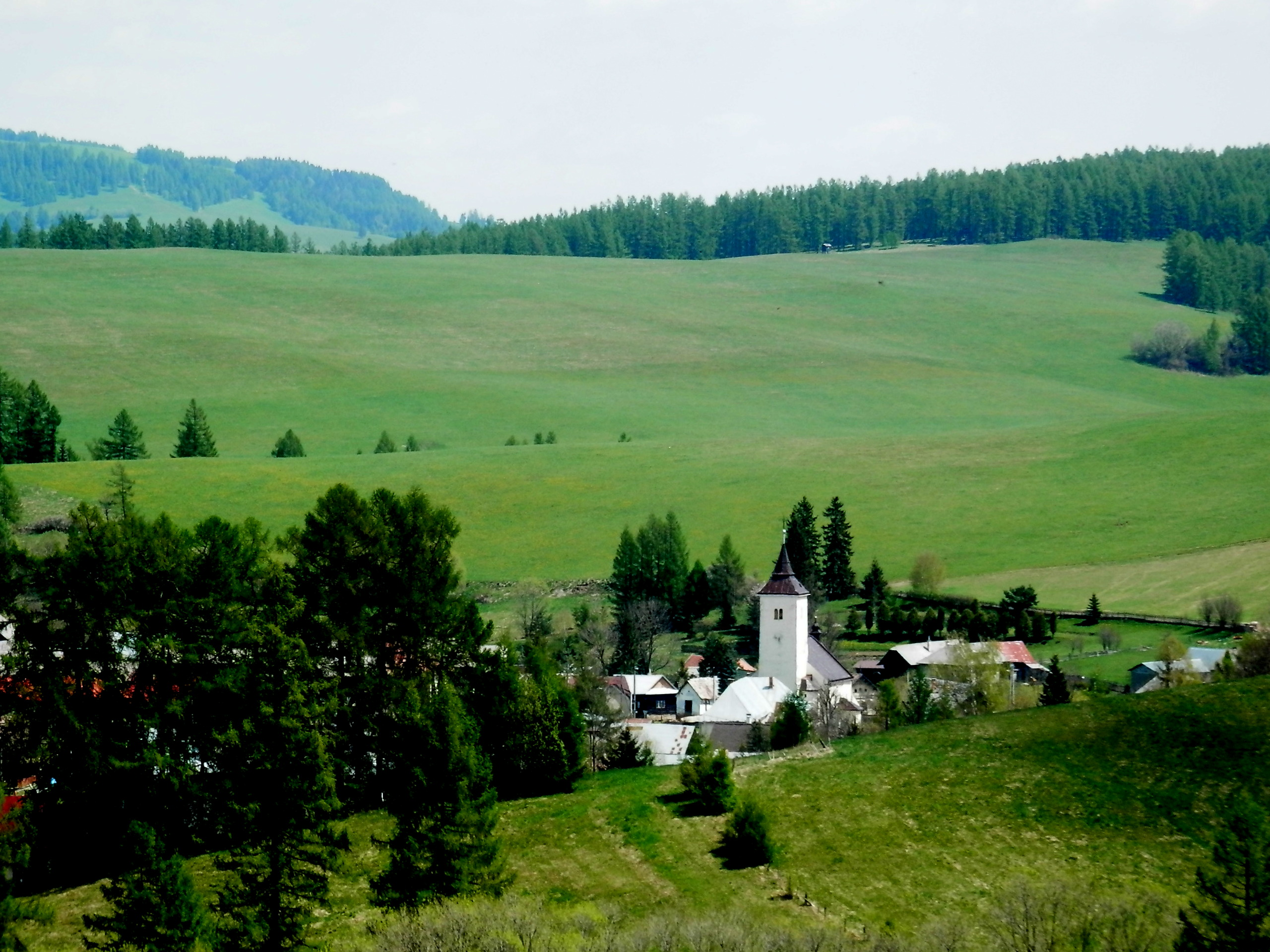

- Flag

- Location of Vyšné Repaše in the Prešov Region Location of Vyšné Repaše in Slovakia
- Coordinates: 49.07°N 20.68°E
- Country: Slovakia
- Region: Prešov Region
- District: Levoča District
- First mentioned: 1323

Area
  - Total: 9.45 km^{2} (3.65 sq mi)
- Elevation: 805 m (2,641 ft)

Population (2025)
  - Total: 90
- Time zone: UTC+1 (CET)
  - Summer (DST): UTC+2 (CEST)
- Postal code: 537 2
- Area code: +421 53
- Vehicle registration plate (until 2022): LE
- Website: www.vysne-repase.dcom.sk

Vyšné Repaše (Hungarian: Felsőrépás) is a village and municipality in Levoča District in the Prešov Region of central-eastern Slovakia.

== History ==
In historical records the village was first mentioned in 1323.

== Geography ==
The municipality lies at an altitude of 805 metres (2,641 ft) and covers an area of 9.45 km^{2} (3.65 sq mi) (2025).

== Population ==
Population statistic (10 years)
Year	1995	2005	2015	2025
Count	137	113	98	90
Difference		−17.51%	−13.27%	−8.16%

Population statistic
Year	2024	2025
Count	92	90
Difference		−2.17%

It has a population of 90 people (31 December 2025).

=== Ethnicity ===
Census 2021 (1+ %)
Ethnicity	Number	Fraction
Slovak	83	95.4%
Not found out	3	3.44%
Rusyn	1	1.14%
Total	87	

In year 2021 was 87 people by ethnicity 83 as Slovak, 3 as Not found out and 1 as Rusyn.

Note on population: The difference values of population numbers in the table "Population statistic" and in the sections "Ethnicity" & "Religion" is caused by the use of various statistical methods.

=== Religion ===
Census 2021 (1+ %)
Religion	Number	Fraction
Roman Catholic Church	81	93.1%
Not found out	3	3.45%
Other	1	1.15%
Greek Catholic Church	1	1.15%
None	1	1.15%
Total	87	

In year 2021 was 87 people by religion 81 from Roman Catholic Church, 3 from Not found out, 1 from Other, 1 from Greek Catholic Church and 1 from None.
