= Buglovce =

Village and municipality in Slovakia

- Municipality
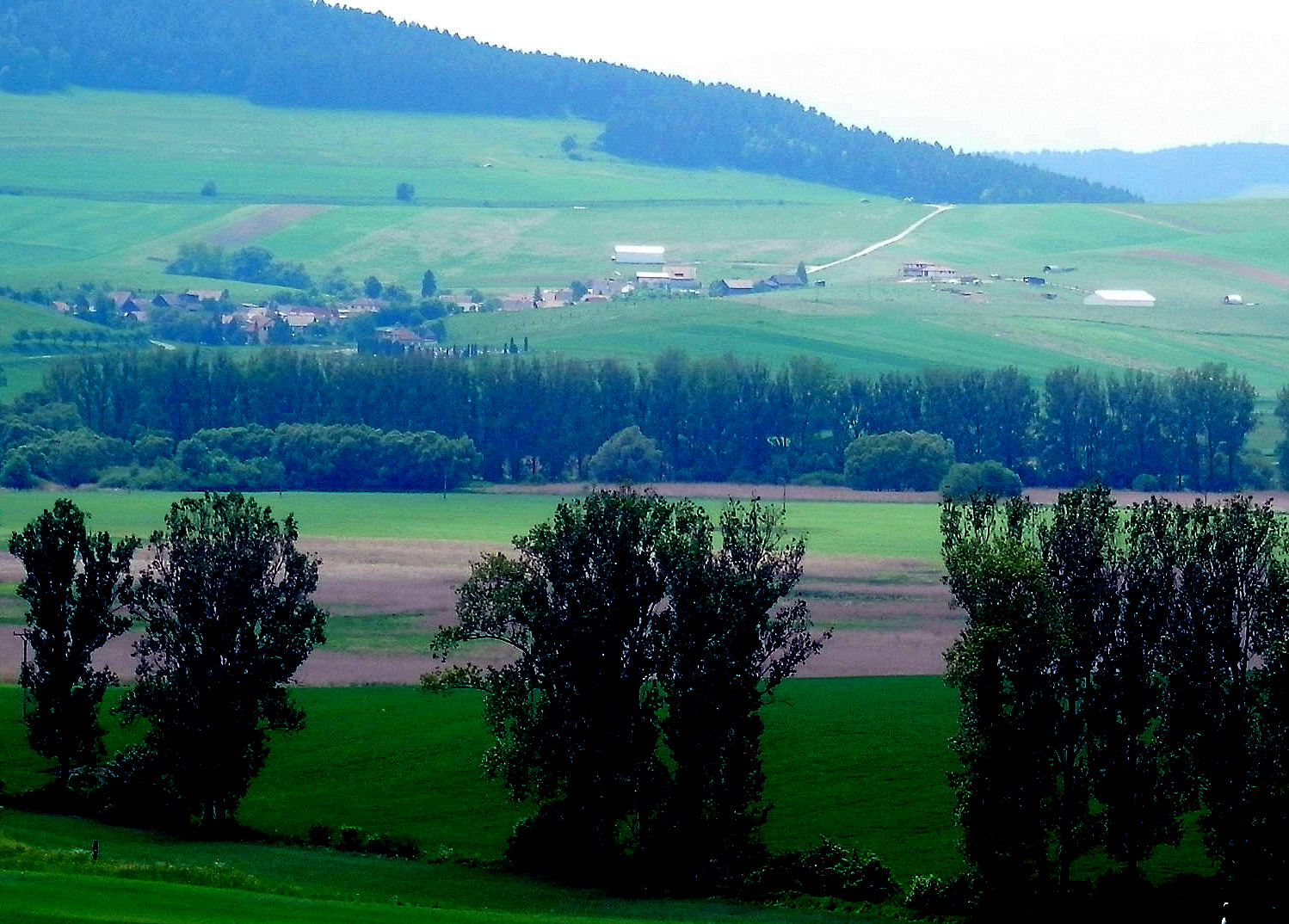

- Flag

- Location of Buglovce in the Prešov Region Location of Buglovce in Slovakia
- Coordinates: 48.98°N 20.70°E
- Country: Slovakia
- Region: Prešov Region
- District: Levoča District
- First mentioned: 1335

Area
  - Total: 3.03 km^{2} (1.17 sq mi)
- Elevation: 455 m (1,493 ft)

Population (2025)
  - Total: 271
- Time zone: UTC+1 (CET)
  - Summer (DST): UTC+2 (CEST)
- Postal code: 530 4
- Area code: +421 53
- Vehicle registration plate (until 2022): LE
- Website: www.obecbuglovce.sk

Buglovce is a village and municipality in Levoča District in the Prešov Region of central-eastern Slovakia.

== History ==
In historical records the village was first mentioned in 1335.

== Geography ==
The municipality lies at an altitude of 455 metres (1,493 ft) and covers an area of 3.03 km^{2} (1.17 sq mi) (2025).

== Population ==
Population statistic (10 years)
Year	1995	2005	2015	2025
Count	259	260	270	271
Difference		+0.38%	+3.84%	+0.37%

Population statistic
Year	2024	2025
Count	269	271
Difference		+0.74%

It has a population of 271 people (31 December 2025).

=== Ethnicity ===
Census 2021 (1+ %)
Ethnicity	Number	Fraction
Slovak	278	99.28%
Not found out	6	2.14%
Total	280	

In year 2021 was 280 people by ethnicity 278 as Slovak, 6 as Not found out and 1 as Other.

Note on population: The difference values of population numbers in the table "Population statistic" and in the sections "Ethnicity" & "Religion" is caused by the use of various statistical methods.

=== Religion ===
Census 2021 (1+ %)
Religion	Number	Fraction
Roman Catholic Church	258	92.14%
None	15	5.36%
Greek Catholic Church	4	1.43%
Total	280	

In year 2021 was 280 people by religion 258 from Roman Catholic Church, 15 from None, 4 from Greek Catholic Church, 1 from Jehovah's Witnesses, 1 from Not found out and 1 from Evangelical Church.

== Genealogical resources ==
The records for genealogical research are available at the state archive "Statny Archiv in Levoca, Slovakia"

- Roman Catholic church records (births/marriages/deaths): 1653-1895 (parish B)

== See also ==
- List of municipalities and towns in Slovakia
