= Lúčka, Levoča District =

Lúčka
- Municipality
- Flag

- Location of Lúčka in the Prešov Region Location of Lúčka in Slovakia
- Coordinates: 49.02°N 20.73°E
- Country: Slovakia
- Region: Prešov Region
- District: Levoča District
- First mentioned: 1273

Area
  - Total: 3.93 km^{2} (1.52 sq mi)
- Elevation: 510 m (1,670 ft)

Population (2025)
  - Total: 115
- Time zone: UTC+1 (CET)
  - Summer (DST): UTC+2 (CEST)
- Postal code: 530 3
- Area code: +421 53
- Vehicle registration plate (until 2022): LE
- Website: www.obec-lucka.sk

Lúčka (Hungarian: Szepesrét) is a village and municipality in Levoča District in the Prešov Region of central-eastern Slovakia.

== History ==
In historical records the village was first mentioned in 1273.

== Geography ==
The municipality lies at an altitude of 510 metres (1,670 ft) and covers an area of 3.93 km^{2} (1.52 sq mi) (2025).

== Population ==
Population statistic (10 years)
Year	1995	2005	2015	2025
Count	114	132	122	115
Difference		+15.78%	−7.57%	−5.73%

Population statistic
Year	2024	2025
Count	115	115
Difference		+1.42%

It has a population of 115 people (31 December 2025).

=== Ethnicity ===
Census 2021 (1+ %)
Ethnicity	Number	Fraction
Slovak	108	94.73%
Not found out	5	4.38%
Total	114	

In year 2021 was 114 people by ethnicity 108 as Slovak, 5 as Not found out and 1 as Polish.

Note on population: The difference values of population numbers in the table "Population statistic" and in the sections "Ethnicity" & "Religion" is caused by the use of various statistical methods.

=== Religion ===
Census 2021 (1+ %)
Religion	Number	Fraction
Roman Catholic Church	96	84.21%
Not found out	5	4.39%
None	5	4.39%
Paganism and natural spirituality	2	1.75%
Greek Catholic Church	2	1.75%
Total	114	

In year 2021 was 114 people by religion 96 from Roman Catholic Church, 5 from Not found out, 5 from None, 2 from Paganism and natural spirituality, 2 from Greek Catholic Church, 1 from Jewish community, 1 from Calvinist Church, 1 from Christian Congregations in Slovakia and 1 from Other.
