= Bijacovce =

Village and municipality in Levoča District in Slovakia

- Municipality
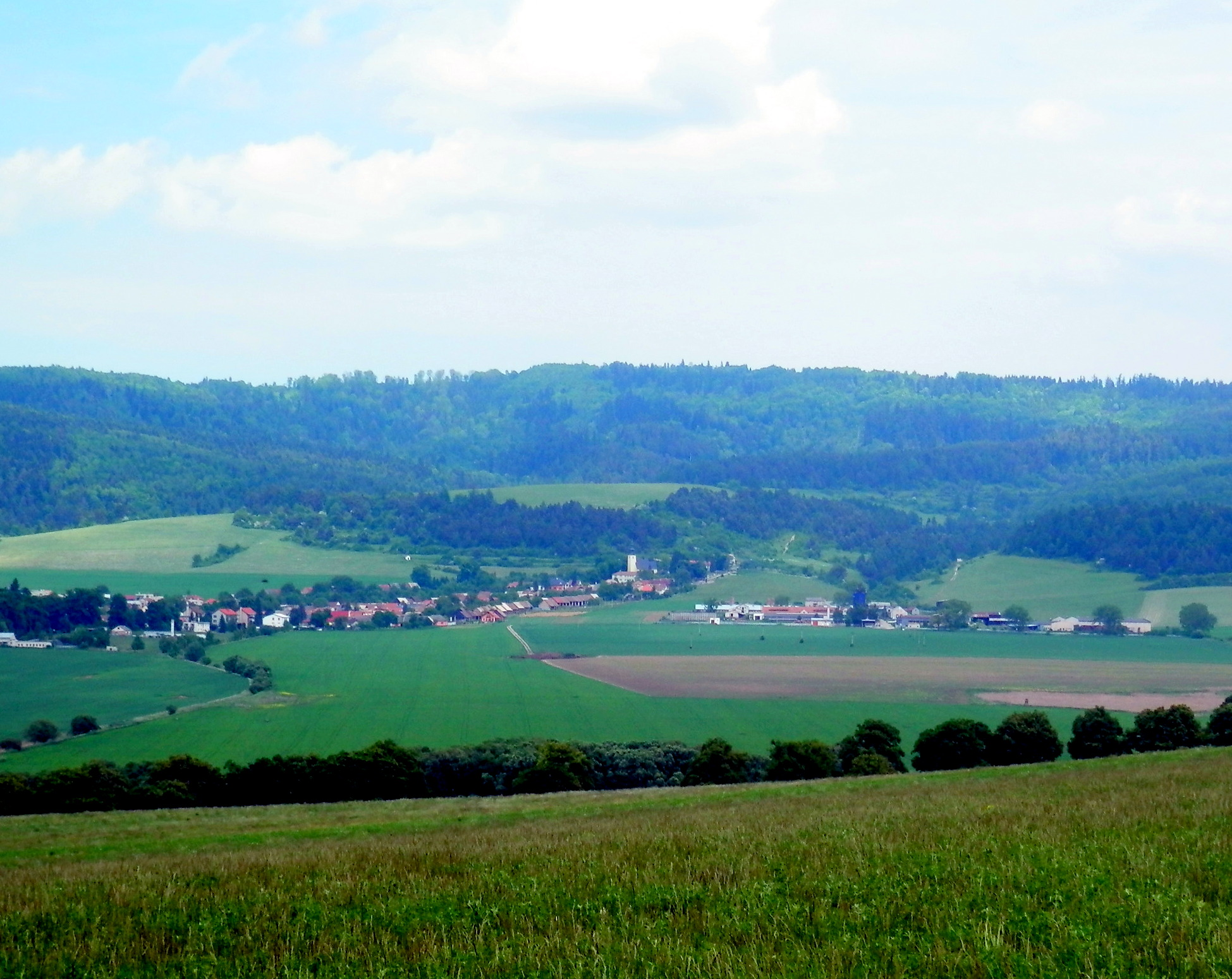

- Flag

- Location of Bijacovce in the Prešov Region Location of Bijacovce in Slovakia
- Coordinates: 49.03°N 20.80°E
- Country: Slovakia
- Region: Prešov Region
- District: Levoča District
- First mentioned: 1258

Area
  - Total: 16.59 km^{2} (6.41 sq mi)
- Elevation: 513 m (1,683 ft)

Population (2025)
  - Total: 968
- Time zone: UTC+1 (CET)
  - Summer (DST): UTC+2 (CEST)
- Postal code: 530 6
- Area code: +421 53
- Vehicle registration plate (until 2022): LE
- Website: www.bijacovce.sk

Bijacovce (Hungarian: Szepesmindszent; German Biazowitz/Betendorf) is a village and municipality in Levoča District in the Prešov Region of central-eastern Slovakia. The village is along the famous Gothic Route and the church dates from the 13th century. The church is gothic with a rotunda to match. There is also a manor house from the 18th century in Bijacovce. The manor house was built between 1780 and 1785 by the Csaky family. The last renovation of the manor house was in 1955. However, it currently is off limits to the public because it was turned into a school. However, next to the manor house, there is a park with deer roaming around it.

== History ==
In historical records the village was first mentioned in 1258.

== Geography ==
The municipality lies at an altitude of 513 metres (1,683 ft) and covers an area of 16.59 km^{2} (6.41 sq mi) (2025).

== Population ==
Population statistic (10 years)
Year	1995	2005	2015	2025
Count	768	847	935	968
Difference		+10.28%	+10.38%	+3.52%

Population statistic
Year	2024	2025
Count	971	968
Difference		−0.30%

It has a population of 968 people (31 December 2025).

=== Ethnicity ===
Census 2021 (1+ %)
Ethnicity	Number	Fraction
Slovak	932	96.38%
Romani	216	22.33%
Not found out	23	2.37%
Total	967	

In year 2021 was 967 people by ethnicity 932 as Slovak, 216 as Romani, 23 as Not found out, 9 as Rusyn, 7 as Other, 2 as Polish, 1 as Czech, 1 as Ukrainian and 1 as German.

Note on population: The difference values of population numbers in the table "Population statistic" and in the sections "Ethnicity" & "Religion" is caused by the use of various statistical methods.

=== Religion ===
Census 2021 (1+ %)
Religion	Number	Fraction
Roman Catholic Church	884	91.42%
None	41	4.24%
Not found out	20	2.07%
Greek Catholic Church	15	1.55%
Total	967	

In year 2021 was 967 people by religion 884 from Roman Catholic Church, 41 from None, 20 from Not found out, 15 from Greek Catholic Church, 3 from Eastern Orthodox Church, 3 from Evangelical Church and 1 from United Methodist Church.

== See also ==
- List of municipalities and towns in Slovakia

== Genealogical resources ==
The records for genealogical research are available at the state archive "Statny Archiv in Levoca, Slovakia"

- Roman Catholic church records (births/marriages/deaths): 1646-1895 (parish A)
