= Pavľany =

Village and municipality in Levoča District in Slovakia

- Municipality
- Flag

- Location of Pavľany in the Prešov Region Location of Pavľany in Slovakia
- Coordinates: 49.07°N 20.72°E
- Country: Slovakia
- Region: Prešov Region
- District: Levoča District
- First mentioned: 1245

Area
  - Total: 7.70 km^{2} (2.97 sq mi)
- Elevation: 789 m (2,589 ft)

Population (2025)
  - Total: 46
- Time zone: UTC+1 (CET)
  - Summer (DST): UTC+2 (CEST)
- Postal code: 537 1
- Area code: +421 53
- Vehicle registration plate (until 2022): LE

Pavľany (Hungarian: Szepesszentpál) is a village and municipality in Levoča District in the Prešov Region of central-eastern Slovakia.

== History ==
In historical records the village was first mentioned in 1245.

== Geography ==
The municipality lies at an altitude of 789 metres (2,589 ft) and covers an area of 7.70 km^{2} (2.97 sq mi) (2025).

== Population ==
Population statistic (10 years)
Year	1995	2005	2015	2025
Count	113	80	52	46
Difference		−29.20%	−35%	−11.53%

Population statistic
Year	2024	2025
Count	43	46
Difference		+6.97%

It has a population of 46 people (31 December 2025).

=== Ethnicity ===
Census 2021 (1+ %)
Ethnicity	Number	Fraction
Slovak	41	97.61%
Rusyn	1	2.38%
Not found out	1	2.38%
Total	42	

In year 2021 was 42 people by ethnicity 41 as Slovak, 1 as Rusyn and 1 as Not found out.

Note on population: The difference values of population numbers in the table "Population statistic" and in the sections "Ethnicity" & "Religion" is caused by the use of various statistical methods.

=== Religion ===
Census 2021 (1+ %)
Religion	Number	Fraction
Roman Catholic Church	40	95.24%
Not found out	1	2.38%
Greek Catholic Church	1	2.38%
Total	42	

In year 2021 was 42 people by religion 40 from Roman Catholic Church, 1 from Not found out and 1 from Greek Catholic Church.
