= Pongrácovce =

Village and municipality in Slovakia

- Municipality
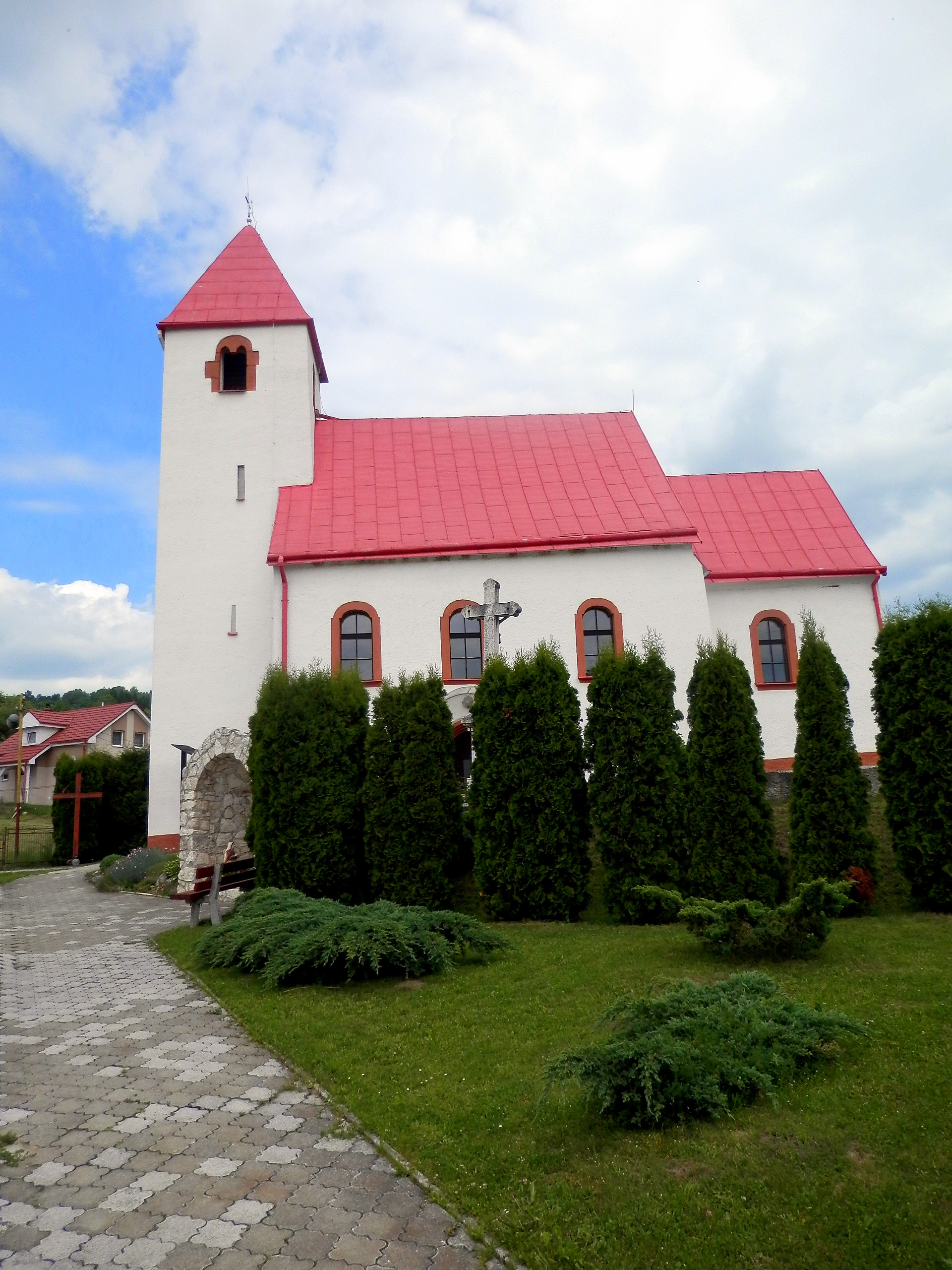

- Flag Coat of arms

- Location of Pongrácovce in the Prešov Region Location of Pongrácovce in Slovakia
- Coordinates: 49.02°N 20.82°E
- Country: Slovakia
- Region: Prešov Region
- District: Levoča District
- First mentioned: 1297

Area
  - Total: 2.98 km^{2} (1.15 sq mi)
- Elevation: 538 m (1,765 ft)

Population (2025)
  - Total: 137
- Time zone: UTC+1 (CET)
  - Summer (DST): UTC+2 (CEST)
- Postal code: 530 6
- Area code: +421 53
- Vehicle registration plate (until 2022): LE

Pongrácovce (Slovak pronunciation: [ˈpɔŋɡraːtsɔwtse]; Hungarian: Pongrácfalva) is a village and municipality in Levoča District in the Prešov Region of central-eastern Slovakia.

== History ==
In historical records, the village was first mentioned in 1297.

== Geography ==
The municipality lies at an altitude of 538 metres (1,765 ft) and covers an area of 2.98 km^{2} (1.15 sq mi) (2025).

== Population ==
Population statistic (10 years)
Year	1995	2005	2015	2025
Count	113	99	112	137
Difference		−12.38%	+13.13%	+22.32%

Population statistic
Year	2024	2025
Count	140	137
Difference		−2.14%

It has a population of 137 people (31 December 2025).

=== Ethnicity ===
Census 2021 (1+ %)
Ethnicity	Number	Fraction
Slovak	125	98.42%
Hungarian	2	1.57%
Total	127	

In year 2021 was 127 people by ethnicity 125 as Slovak, 2 as Hungarian, 1 as Vietnamese, 1 as Not found out and 1 as Canadian.

Note on population: The difference values of population numbers in the table "Population statistic" and in the sections "Ethnicity" & "Religion" is caused by the use of various statistical methods.

=== Religion ===
Census 2021 (1+ %)
Religion	Number	Fraction
Roman Catholic Church	125	98.43%
Total	127	

In year 2021 was 127 people by religion 125 from Roman Catholic Church, 1 from Greek Catholic Church and 1 from None.
