= Harakovce =

Village and municipality in Slovakia

- Municipality
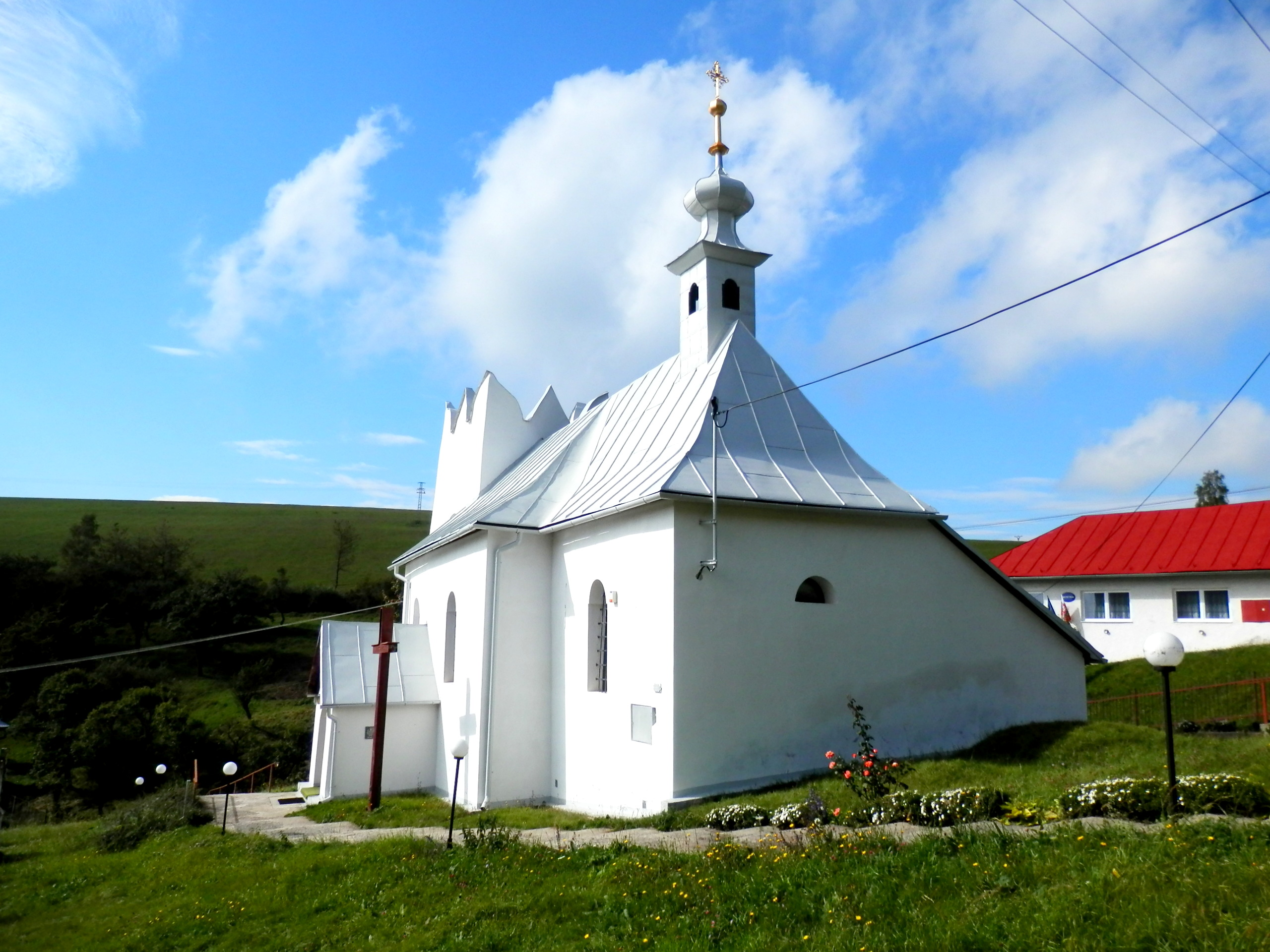

- Flag

- Location of Harakovce in the Prešov Region Location of Harakovce in Slovakia
- Coordinates: 49.00°N 20.85°E
- Country: Slovakia
- Region: Prešov Region
- District: Levoča District
- First mentioned: 1272

Area
  - Total: 5.27 km^{2} (2.03 sq mi)
- Elevation: 601 m (1,972 ft)

Population (2025)
  - Total: 54
- Time zone: UTC+1 (CET)
  - Summer (DST): UTC+2 (CEST)
- Postal code: 530 5
- Area code: +421 53
- Vehicle registration plate (until 2022): LE
- Website: www.harakovce.sk

Harakovce (Hungarian: Harakóc) is a village and municipality in Levoča District in the Prešov Region of central-eastern Slovakia.

== History ==
In historical records the village was first mentioned in 1272.

== Geography ==
The municipality lies at an altitude of 601 metres (1,972 ft) and covers an area of 5.27 km^{2} (2.03 sq mi) (2025).

== Population ==
Population statistic (10 years)
Year	1995	2005	2015	2025
Count	71	66	57	54
Difference		−7.04%	−13.63%	−5.26%

Population statistic
Year	2024	2025
Count	54	54
Difference		+0%

It has a population of 54 people (31 December 2025).

=== Ethnicity ===
Census 2021 (1+ %)
Ethnicity	Number	Fraction
Slovak	57	98.27%
Ukrainian	1	1.72%
Total	58	

In year 2021 was 58 people by ethnicity 57 as Slovak and 1 as Ukrainian.

Note on population: The difference values of population numbers in the table "Population statistic" and in the sections "Ethnicity" & "Religion" is caused by the use of various statistical methods.

=== Religion ===
Census 2021 (1+ %)
Religion	Number	Fraction
Roman Catholic Church	54	93.1%
Greek Catholic Church	4	6.9%
Total	58	

In year 2021 was 58 people by religion 54 from Roman Catholic Church and 4 from Greek Catholic Church.

== Genealogical resources ==
The records for genealogical research are available at the state archive "Statny Archiv in Levoca, Slovakia":

- Roman Catholic church records (births/marriages/deaths): 1669-1898 (parish B)

== See also ==
- List of municipalities and towns in Slovakia
