= Kurimany =

Village and municipality in Slovakia

- Municipality
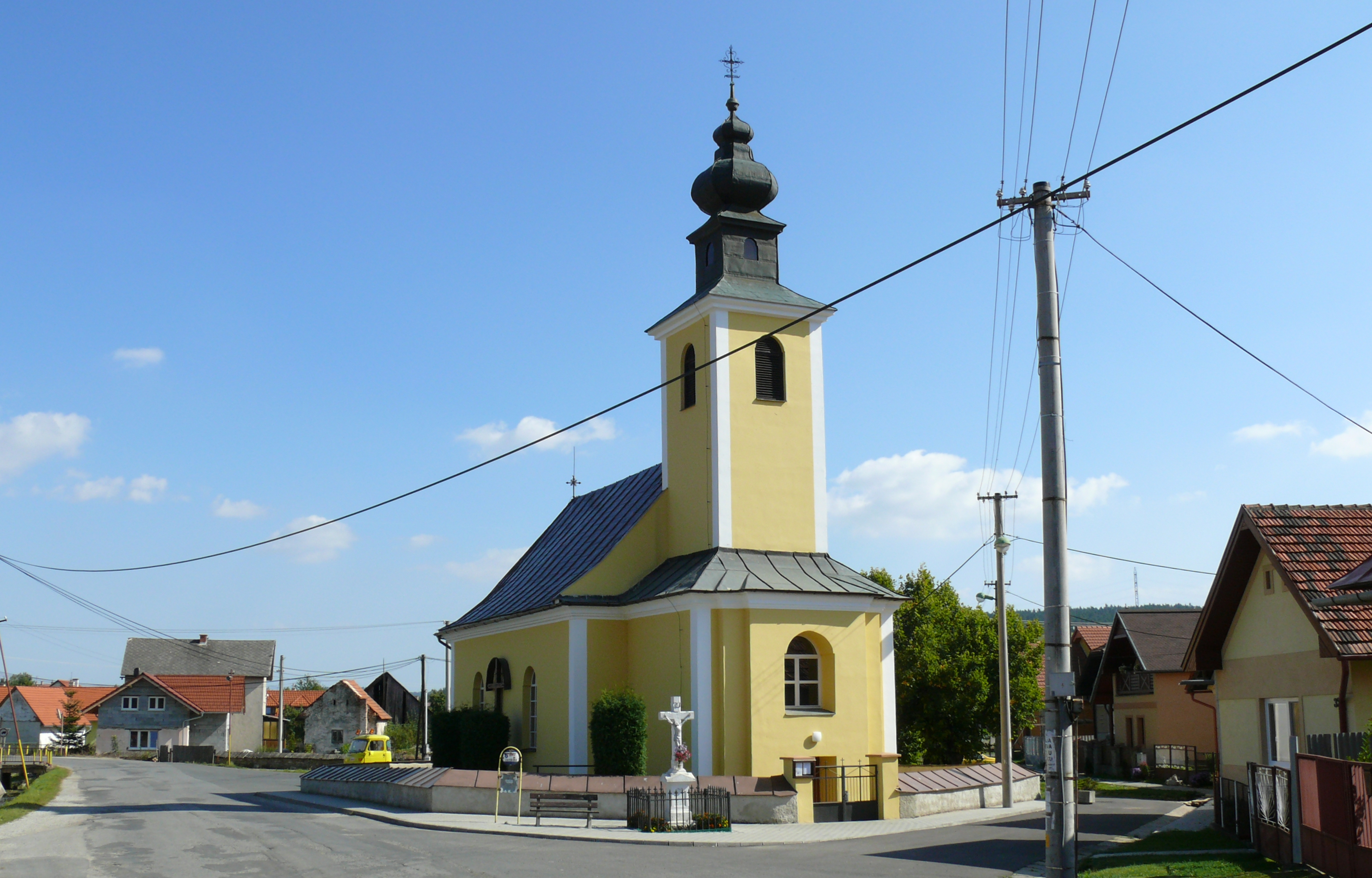

- Flag Coat of arms

- Location of Kurimany in the Prešov Region Location of Kurimany in Slovakia
- Coordinates: 49.00°N 20.55°E
- Country: Slovakia
- Region: Prešov Region
- District: Levoča District
- First mentioned: 1298

Area
  - Total: 2.58 km^{2} (1.00 sq mi)
- Elevation: 522 m (1,713 ft)

Population (2025)
  - Total: 386
- Time zone: UTC+1 (CET)
  - Summer (DST): UTC+2 (CEST)
- Postal code: 540 1
- Area code: +421 53
- Vehicle registration plate (until 2022): LE
- Website: www.obeckurimany.sk

Kurimany (Hungarian: Kiskerény) is a village and municipality in Levoča District in the Prešov Region of central-eastern Slovakia.

== History ==
In historical records the village was first mentioned in 1298.

== Geography ==
The municipality lies at an altitude of 522 metres (1,713 ft) and covers an area of 2.58 km^{2} (1.00 sq mi) (2025).

== Population ==
Population statistic (10 years)
Year	1995	2005	2015	2025
Count	345	365	360	386
Difference		+5.79%	−1.36%	+7.22%

Population statistic
Year	2024	2025
Count	390	386
Difference		−1.02%

It has a population of 386 people (31 December 2025).

=== Ethnicity ===
Census 2021 (1+ %)
Ethnicity	Number	Fraction
Slovak	363	98.37%
Not found out	5	1.35%
Total	369	

In year 2021 was 369 people by ethnicity 363 as Slovak, 5 as Not found out, 3 as Russian, 2 as Czech, 2 as Rusyn, 1 as Polish and 1 as English.

Note on population: The difference values of population numbers in the table "Population statistic" and in the sections "Ethnicity" & "Religion" is caused by the use of various statistical methods.

=== Religion ===
Census 2021 (1+ %)
Religion	Number	Fraction
Roman Catholic Church	338	91.6%
None	18	4.88%
Greek Catholic Church	9	2.44%
Total	369	

In year 2021 was 369 people by religion 338 from Roman Catholic Church, 18 from None, 9 from Greek Catholic Church, 2 from Not found out, 1 from Christian Congregations in Slovakia and 1 from Apostolic Church.
