= Uloža =

Village and municipality in Slovakia

- Municipality
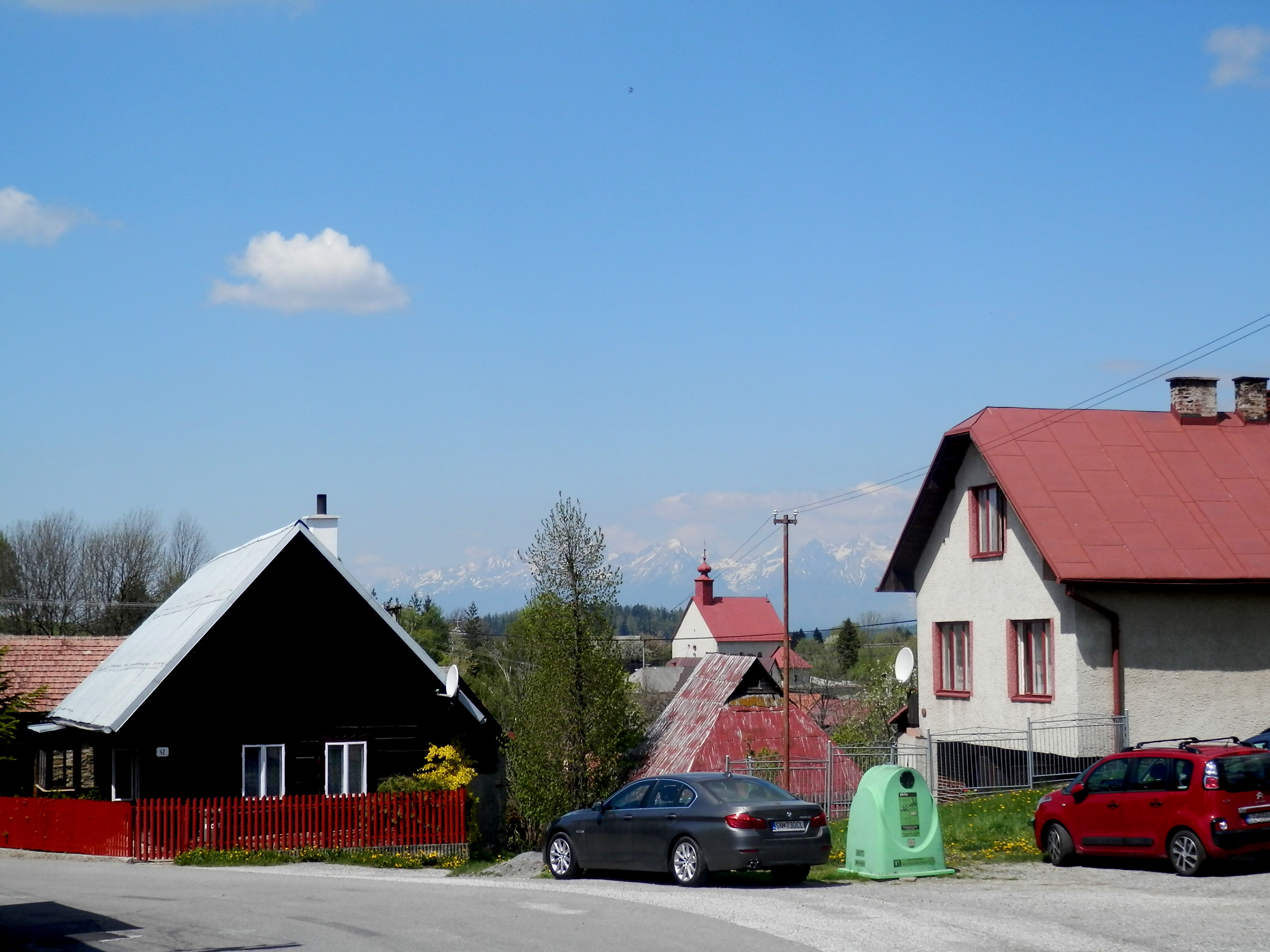

- Flag

- Location of Uloža in the Prešov Region Location of Uloža in Slovakia
- Coordinates: 49.05°N 20.65°E
- Country: Slovakia
- Region: Prešov Region
- District: Levoča District
- First mentioned: 1280

Area
  - Total: 6.83 km^{2} (2.64 sq mi)
- Elevation: 865 m (2,838 ft)

Population (2025)
  - Total: 258
- Time zone: UTC+1 (CET)
  - Summer (DST): UTC+2 (CEST)
- Postal code: 537 1
- Area code: +421 53
- Vehicle registration plate (until 2022): LE
- Website: www.obeculoza.sk

Uloža (Hungarian: Kőperény) is a village and municipality in Levoča District in the Prešov Region of central-eastern Slovakia.

== History ==
In historical records the village was first mentioned in 1280. Uloža was a village for people infected leprosy. Name of village is Uloža because word "bury" may be translated like "uložiť".

== Geography ==
The municipality lies at an altitude of 865 metres (2,838 ft) and covers an area of 6.83 km^{2} (2.64 sq mi) (2025).

== Population ==
Population statistic (10 years)
Year	1995	2005	2015	2025
Count	183	183	201	258
Difference		+0%	+9.83%	+28.35%

Population statistic
Year	2024	2025
Count	247	258
Difference		+4.45%

It has a population of 258 people (31 December 2025).

=== Ethnicity ===
Census 2021 (1+ %)
Ethnicity	Number	Fraction
Slovak	213	96.81%
Rusyn	14	6.36%
Hungarian	4	1.81%
Not found out	3	1.36%
Total	220	

In year 2021 was 220 people by ethnicity 213 as Slovak, 14 as Rusyn, 4 as Hungarian and 3 as Not found out.

Note on population: The difference values of population numbers in the table "Population statistic" and in the sections "Ethnicity" & "Religion" is caused by the use of various statistical methods.

=== Religion ===
Census 2021 (1+ %)
Religion	Number	Fraction
Roman Catholic Church	184	83.64%
None	22	10%
Greek Catholic Church	10	4.55%
Not found out	3	1.36%
Total	220	

In year 2021 was 220 people by religion 184 from Roman Catholic Church, 22 from None, 10 from Greek Catholic Church, 3 from Not found out and 1 from Calvinist Church.
