= Šimon Ondruš =

Slovak linguist and Slavist (1924–2011)

Šimon Ondruš (* 27 October 1924, Klčov – † 8 January 2011, Bratislava) was a Slovak linguist, Slavist and indo-Europeanist, member of several international linguistic societies.

== Life ==
He studied Slovak language and philosophy at the Comenius University in Bratislava. He became a professor in 1967, then he worked in several positions at the university (Pro Dean, Dean, the head of the Department of Slavic and Indo-European Studies). The head of the Slovak Committee of Slavists (1969–1970). He dealt with comparative Slavic and Indo-European linguistics, especially etymology, Old Slavonic, general linguistics and history of linguistics. He taught Slovak and Czech at the University of Debrecen and Slovak and Czech studies at the University of Cologne. He translated from Hungarian and German.

== Selected works ==
- Úvod do slavistiky [Introduction to Slavic Studies] (1955, 1956, 1959)
- Szláv népek és nyelvek [Slavic Peoples and languages] (1962, co-author)
- Úvod do štúdia jazykov [Introduction to Linguistics] (1981, 1984, 1987)
- Život a dielo Metoda, prvoučiteľa národa slovienskeho [Life and Work of Methodius, the First Teacher of Slovene nation] (1985)
- Odtajnené trezory [Declassified Safes] (2000)
- Odtajnené trezory slov 2, 3 [Declassified Safes of Words] (2002, 2004)

== Awards ==
- 1975 Order of Cyril and Methodius (Bulgaria)
- 1980 Medal Komisji Edukacji Narodowej (Poland)
