= Dlhé Stráže =

Municipality of Slovakia

- Municipality
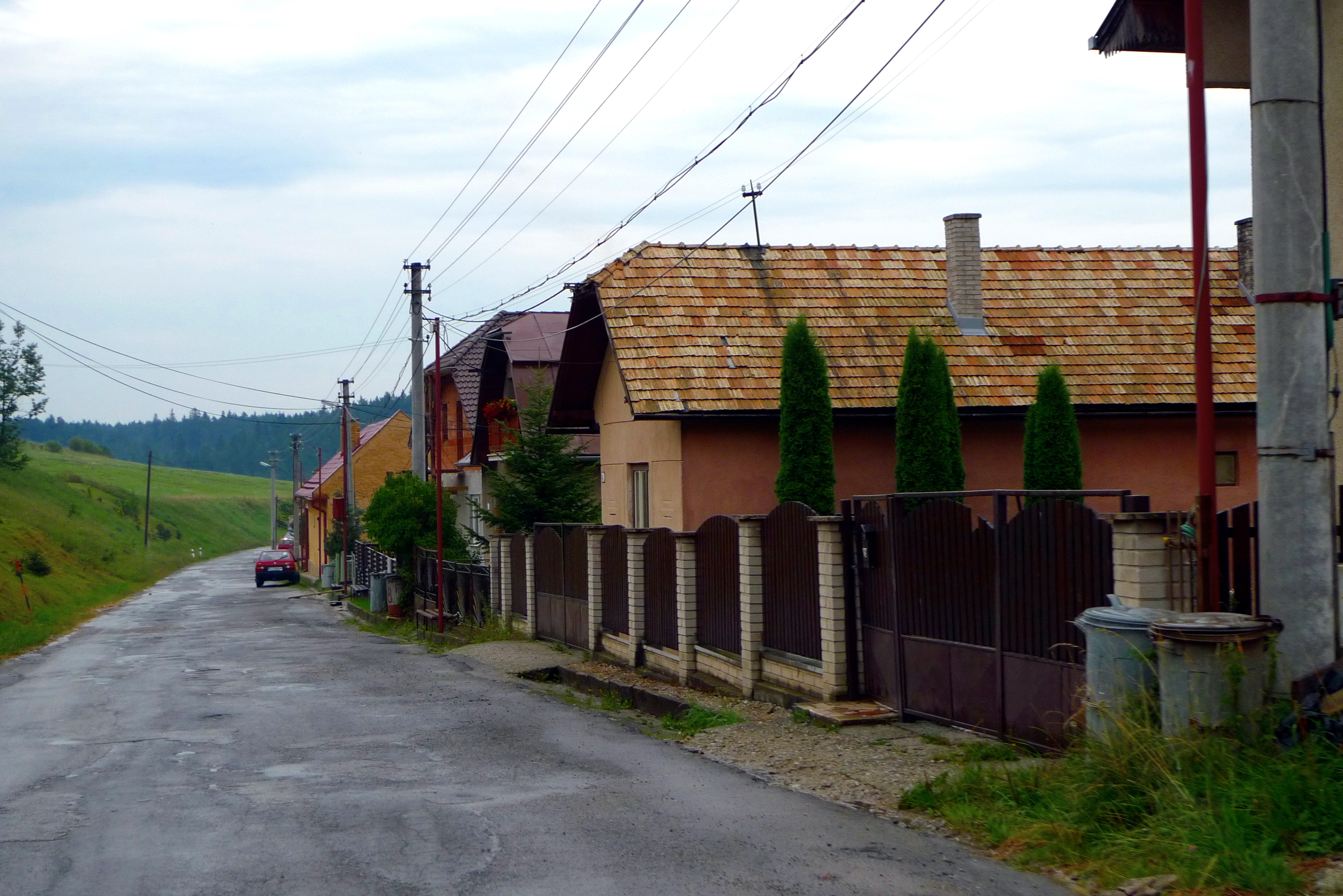

- Flag

- Location of Dlhé Stráže in the Prešov Region Location of Dlhé Stráže in Slovakia
- Coordinates: 49.03°N 20.52°E
- Country: Slovakia
- Region: Prešov Region
- District: Levoča District
- First mentioned: 1278

Area
  - Total: 3.37 km^{2} (1.30 sq mi)
- Elevation: 599 m (1,965 ft)

Population (2025)
  - Total: 615
- Time zone: UTC+1 (CET)
  - Summer (DST): UTC+2 (CEST)
- Postal code: 540 1
- Area code: +421 53
- Vehicle registration plate (until 2022): LE
- Website: dlhestraze.sk

Dlhé Stráže (previously Lengvárty, Hungarian: Lengvárt, German: Litzier) is a village and municipality in Levoča District in the Prešov Region of central-eastern Slovakia.

== History ==
In historical records the village was first mentioned in 1278.

== Geography ==
The municipality lies at an altitude of 599 metres (1,965 ft) and covers an area of 3.37 km^{2} (1.30 sq mi) (2025).

== Population ==
Population statistic (10 years)
Year	1995	2005	2015	2025
Count	448	507	565	615
Difference		+13.16%	+11.43%	+8.84%

Population statistic
Year	2024	2025
Count	618	615
Difference		−0.48%

It has a population of 615 people (31 December 2025).

=== Ethnicity ===
Census 2021 (1+ %)
Ethnicity	Number	Fraction
Slovak	579	96.98%
Not found out	19	3.18%
Romani	11	1.84%
Czech	6	1%
Total	597	

In year 2021 was 597 people by ethnicity 579 as Slovak, 19 as Not found out, 11 as Romani, 6 as Czech, 3 as Rusyn, 2 as Russian and 1 as Hungarian.

Note on population: The difference values of population numbers in the table "Population statistic" and in the sections "Ethnicity" & "Religion" is caused by the use of various statistical methods.

=== Religion ===
Census 2021 (1+ %)
Religion	Number	Fraction
Roman Catholic Church	493	82.58%
None	77	12.9%
Not found out	14	2.35%
Greek Catholic Church	10	1.68%
Total	597	

In year 2021 was 597 people by religion 493 from Roman Catholic Church, 77 from None, 14 from Not found out, 10 from Greek Catholic Church, 1 from Other, 1 from United Methodist Church and 1 from Buddhism.

== Genealogical resources ==
The records for genealogical research are available at the state archive "Statny Archiv in Levoca, Slovakia"

- Roman Catholic church records (births/marriages/deaths): 1700-1897 (parish B)

== See also ==
- List of municipalities and towns in Slovakia
