= Ordzovany =

Village and municipality in Slovakia

- Municipality
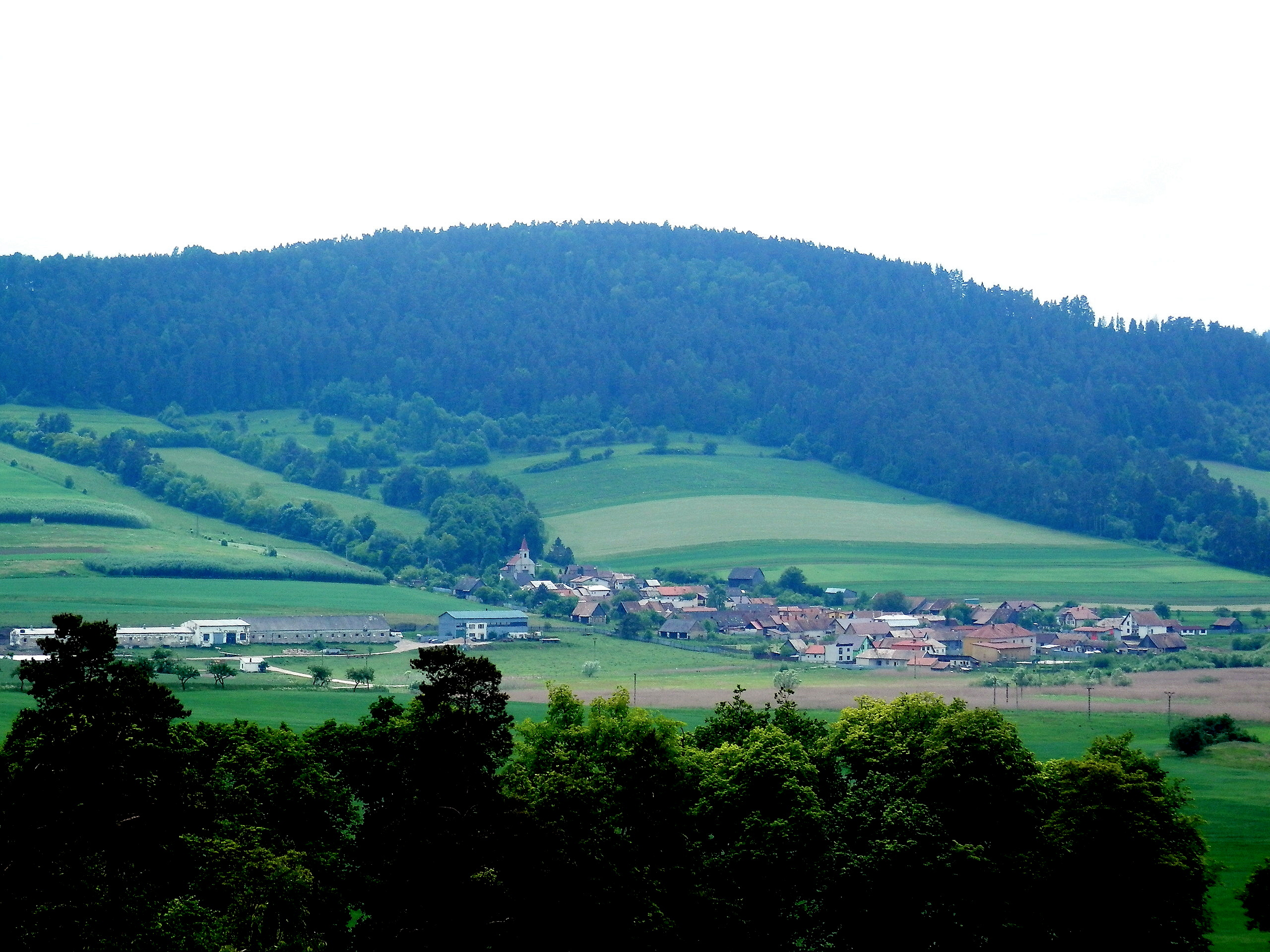

- Flag

- Location of Ordzovany in the Prešov Region Location of Ordzovany in Slovakia
- Coordinates: 49°02′00″N 20°47′10″E
- Country: Slovakia
- Region: Prešov Region
- District: Levoča District
- First mentioned: 1260

Area
  - Total: 12.07 km^{2} (4.66 sq mi)
- Elevation: 543 m (1,781 ft)

Population (2025)
  - Total: 164
- Time zone: UTC+1 (CET)
  - Summer (DST): UTC+2 (CEST)
- Postal code: 530 4
- Area code: +421 53
- Vehicle registration plate (until 2022): LE
- Website: www.ordzovany.dcom.sk

Ordzovany (Hungarian: Ragyóc) is a village and municipality in Levoča District in the Prešov Region of central-eastern Slovakia.

== History ==
In historical records the village was first mentioned in 1260.

== Geography ==
The municipality lies at an altitude of 543 metres (1,781 ft) and covers an area of 12.07 km^{2} (4.66 sq mi) (2025).

== Population ==
Population statistic (10 years)
Year	1995	2005	2015	2025
Count	145	166	165	164
Difference		+14.48%	−0.60%	−0.60%

Population statistic
Year	2024	2025
Count	162	164
Difference		+1.23%

It has a population of 164 people (31 December 2025).

=== Ethnicity ===
Census 2021 (1+ %)
Ethnicity	Number	Fraction
Slovak	157	99.36%
Not found out	2	1.26%
Total	158	

In year 2021 was 158 people by ethnicity 157 as Slovak, 2 as Not found out and 1 as Rusyn.

Note on population: The difference values of population numbers in the table "Population statistic" and in the sections "Ethnicity" & "Religion" is caused by the use of various statistical methods.

=== Religion ===
Census 2021 (1+ %)
Religion	Number	Fraction
Roman Catholic Church	138	87.34%
None	18	11.39%
Greek Catholic Church	2	1.27%
Total	158	

In year 2021 was 158 people by religion 138 from Roman Catholic Church, 18 from None and 2 from Greek Catholic Church.
