= Dúbrava, Levoča District =

Village and municipality in Slovakia

Dúbrava
- Municipality
- Flag

- Location of Dúbrava in the Prešov Region Location of Dúbrava in Slovakia
- Coordinates: 48.98°N 20.85°E
- Country: Slovakia
- Region: Prešov Region
- District: Levoča District
- First mentioned: 1293

Area
  - Total: 9.60 km^{2} (3.71 sq mi)
- Elevation: 623 m (2,044 ft)

Population (2025)
  - Total: 339
- Time zone: UTC+1 (CET)
  - Summer (DST): UTC+2 (CEST)
- Postal code: 530 5
- Area code: +421 53
- Vehicle registration plate (until 2022): LE
- Website: www.dubravaspis.sk

Dúbrava (Hungarian: Szepestölgyes) is a village and municipality in Levoča District in the Prešov Region of central-eastern Slovakia.

== History ==
In historical records the village was first mentioned in 1293.

== Geography ==
The municipality lies at an altitude of 623 metres (2,044 ft) and covers an area of 9.60 km^{2} (3.71 sq mi) (2025).

== Population ==
Population statistic (10 years)
Year	1995	2005	2015	2025
Count	330	360	325	339
Difference		+9.09%	−9.72%	+4.30%

Population statistic
Year	2024	2025
Count	332	339
Difference		+2.10%

It has a population of 339 people (31 December 2025).

=== Ethnicity ===
Census 2021 (1+ %)
Ethnicity	Number	Fraction
Slovak	319	96.96%
Not found out	9	2.73%
Rusyn	5	1.51%
Total	329	

In year 2021 was 329 people by ethnicity 319 as Slovak, 9 as Not found out, 5 as Rusyn, 1 as Polish and 1 as Hungarian.

Note on population: The difference values of population numbers in the table "Population statistic" and in the sections "Ethnicity" & "Religion" is caused by the use of various statistical methods.

=== Religion ===
Census 2021 (1+ %)
Religion	Number	Fraction
Roman Catholic Church	305	92.71%
None	11	3.34%
Not found out	8	2.43%
Total	329	

In year 2021 was 329 people by religion 305 from Roman Catholic Church, 11 from None, 8 from Not found out, 2 from Greek Catholic Church, 2 from Ad hoc movements and 1 from Other.

== Genealogical resources ==
The records for genealogical research are available at the state archive "Statny Archiv in Presov, Slovakia"

- Roman Catholic church records (births/marriages/deaths): 1616-1898 (parish B)
- Greek Catholic church records (births/marriages/deaths): 1762-1895 (parish B)

== See also ==
- List of municipalities and towns in Slovakia
