= Slavkov (surname) =

Slavkov (Cyrillic: Славков) is Slavic masculine surname, its feminine counterpart is Slavkova. The surname may refer to:

- Georgi Slavkov (1958–2014), Bulgarian football forward
- Ivan Slavkov (1940–2011), Bulgarian sports administrator
