= Domaňovce =

Village and municipality in Levoča, Prešov, Slovakia

- Municipality
- Flag

- Location of Domaňovce in the Prešov Region Location of Domaňovce in Slovakia
- Coordinates: 48.96°N 20.66°E
- Country: Slovakia
- Region: Prešov Region
- District: Levoča District
- First mentioned: 1258

Area
  - Total: 12.83 km^{2} (4.95 sq mi)
- Elevation: 436 m (1,430 ft)

Population (2025)
  - Total: 914
- Time zone: UTC+1 (CET)
  - Summer (DST): UTC+2 (CEST)
- Postal code: 530 2
- Area code: +421 53
- Vehicle registration plate (until 2022): LE
- Website: www.domanovce.dcom.sk

Domaňovce is a village and municipality in Levoča District in the Prešov Region of central-eastern Slovakia.

== History ==
In historical records the village was first mentioned in 1258.

== Geography ==
The municipality lies at an altitude of 436 metres (1,430 ft) and covers an area of 12.83 km^{2} (4.95 sq mi) (2025).

== Population ==
Population statistic (10 years)
Year	1995	2005	2015	2025
Count	869	880	913	914
Difference		+1.26%	+3.75%	+0.10%

Population statistic
Year	2024	2025
Count	919	914
Difference		−0.54%

It has a population of 914 people (31 December 2025).

=== Ethnicity ===
Census 2021 (1+ %)
Ethnicity	Number	Fraction
Slovak	889	98.01%
Not found out	18	1.98%
Total	907	

In year 2021 was 907 people by ethnicity 889 as Slovak, 18 as Not found out, 8 as Romani, 4 as Rusyn, 3 as Czech, 1 as Other and 1 as English.

Note on population: The difference values of population numbers in the table "Population statistic" and in the sections "Ethnicity" & "Religion" is caused by the use of various statistical methods.

=== Religion ===
Census 2021 (1+ %)
Religion	Number	Fraction
Roman Catholic Church	829	91.4%
None	35	3.86%
Not found out	17	1.87%
Greek Catholic Church	15	1.65%
Total	907	

In year 2021 was 907 people by religion 829 from Roman Catholic Church, 35 from None, 17 from Not found out, 15 from Greek Catholic Church, 4 from Evangelical Church, 2 from Calvinist Church, 2 from Buddhism, 1 from Eastern Orthodox Church, 1 from Christian Congregations in Slovakia and 1 from Ad hoc movements.

== Genealogical resources ==
Records for genealogical research are available at the state archive, Statny Archiv, in Levoca, Slovakia.

- Roman Catholic church records (births/marriages/deaths): 1646–1896 (parish B)

== See also ==
- List of municipalities and towns in Slovakia
