= Vyšný Slavkov =

Village and municipality in Slovakia

- Municipality
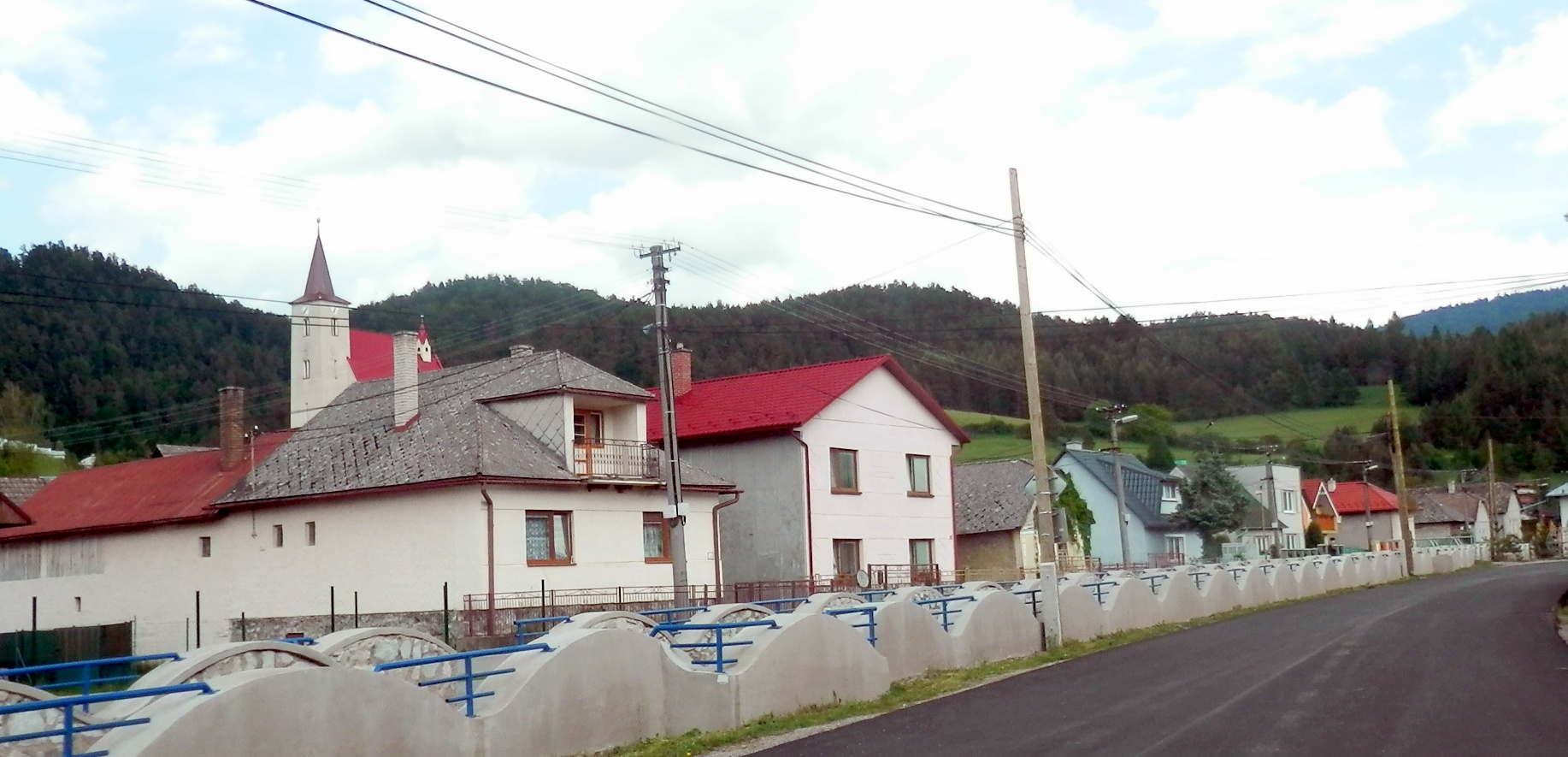

- Flag

- Location of Vyšný Slavkov in the Prešov Region Location of Vyšný Slavkov in Slovakia
- Coordinates: 49.07°N 20.87°E
- Country: Slovakia
- Region: Prešov Region
- District: Levoča District
- First mentioned: 1347

Area
  - Total: 17.18 km^{2} (6.63 sq mi)
- Elevation: 561 m (1,841 ft)

Population (2025)
  - Total: 255
- Time zone: UTC+1 (CET)
  - Summer (DST): UTC+2 (CEST)
- Postal code: 537 4
- Area code: +421 53
- Vehicle registration plate (until 2022): LE
- Website: www.vysny-slavkov.sk

Vyšný Slavkov (Slovak pronunciation: [ˈʋiʂniː ˈslawkɔw]; Hungarian: Felsőszalók) is a village and municipality in Levoča District in the Prešov Region of central-eastern Slovakia.

== History ==
In historical records the village was first mentioned in 1347.

== Geography ==
The municipality lies at an altitude of 561 metres (1,841 ft) and covers an area of 17.18 km^{2} (6.63 sq mi) (2025).

== Population ==
Population statistic (10 years)
| Year | 1995 | 2005 | 2015 | 2025 |
|---|---|---|---|---|
| Count | 359 | 333 | 271 | 255 |
| Difference | | −7.24% | −18.61% | −5.90% |

Population statistic
| Year | 2024 | 2025 |
|---|---|---|
| Count | 258 | 255 |
| Difference | | −1.16% |

It has a population of 255 people (31 December 2025).

=== Ethnicity ===
Census 2021 (1+ %)
| Ethnicity | Number | Fraction |
|---|---|---|
| Slovak | 257 | 98.84% |
| Not found out | 5 | 1.92% |
| Total | 260 | |

In year 2021 was 260 people by ethnicity 257 as Slovak, 5 as Not found out, 2 as Russian, 1 as Czech, 1 as Romani and 1 as Rusyn.

Note on population: The difference values of population numbers in the table "Population statistic" and in the sections "Ethnicity" & "Religion" is caused by the use of various statistical methods.

=== Religion ===
Census 2021 (1+ %)
| Religion | Number | Fraction |
|---|---|---|
| Roman Catholic Church | 242 | 93.08% |
| None | 7 | 2.69% |
| Greek Catholic Church | 6 | 2.31% |
| Not found out | 3 | 1.15% |
| Total | 260 | |

In year 2021 was 260 people by religion 242 from Roman Catholic Church, 7 from None, 6 from Greek Catholic Church, 3 from Not found out, 1 from Evangelical Church and 1 from Ad hoc movements.

== Industry ==
Mining
| Place | Material | 2016 | 2017 | 2018 | 2019 | 2020 | 2021 | 2022 | 2023 | 2024 |
|---|---|---|---|---|---|---|---|---|---|---|
| Quarry Vyšný Slavkov | Limestone | 0,1 kt | 0,1 kt | 0,3 kt | 0,3 kt | 72,0 kt | 52,0 kt | 66 kt | 10 kt | 76 kt |
