= Doľany, Levoča District =

Village and municipality in Levoča District in Slovakia

Doľany
- Municipality
- Flag

- Location of Doľany in the Prešov Region Location of Doľany in Slovakia
- Coordinates: 49.01°N 20.65°E
- Country: Slovakia
- Region: Prešov Region
- District: Levoča District
- First mentioned: 1314

Area
  - Total: 3.67 km^{2} (1.42 sq mi)
- Elevation: 590 m (1,940 ft)

Population (2025)
  - Total: 941
- Time zone: UTC+1 (CET)
  - Summer (DST): UTC+2 (CEST)
- Postal code: 530 2
- Area code: +421 53
- Vehicle registration plate (until 2022): LE
- Website: www.obecdolany.sk

Doľany is a village and municipality in Levoča District in the Prešov Region of central-eastern Slovakia.

== History ==
In historical records the village was first mentioned in 1314.

== Geography ==
The municipality lies at an altitude of 590 metres (1,940 ft) and covers an area of 3.67 km^{2} (1.42 sq mi) (2025).

== Population ==
Population statistic (10 years)
Year	1995	2005	2015	2025
Count	284	443	669	941
Difference		+55.98%	+51.01%	+40.65%

Population statistic
Year	2024	2025
Count	901	941
Difference		+4.43%

It has a population of 941 people (31 December 2025).

=== Ethnicity ===
Census 2021 (1+ %)
Ethnicity	Number	Fraction
Romani	558	71.63%
Slovak	222	28.49%
Total	779	

In year 2021 was 779 people by ethnicity 558 as Romani, 222 as Slovak, 7 as Not found out, 3 as Russian, 2 as Czech, 2 as Rusyn and 1 as Hungarian.

Note on population: The difference values of population numbers in the table "Population statistic" and in the sections "Ethnicity" & "Religion" is caused by the use of various statistical methods.

The vast majority of the municipality's population consists of the local Roma community. In 2019, they constituted an estimated 76% of the local population and are concentrated in the former village of Roškovce.

=== Religion ===
Census 2021 (1+ %)
Religion	Number	Fraction
Roman Catholic Church	708	90.89%
None	63	8.09%
Total	779	

In year 2021 was 779 people by religion 708 from Roman Catholic Church, 63 from None, 7 from Not found out and 1 from Evangelical Church.

== Genealogical resources ==
The records for genealogical research are available at the state archive "Statny Archiv in Levoca, Slovakia"

- Roman Catholic church records (births/marriages/deaths): 1749-1896 (parish B)

== See also ==
- List of municipalities and towns in Slovakia
