= Klčov =

Village and municipality in Slovakia

- Municipality
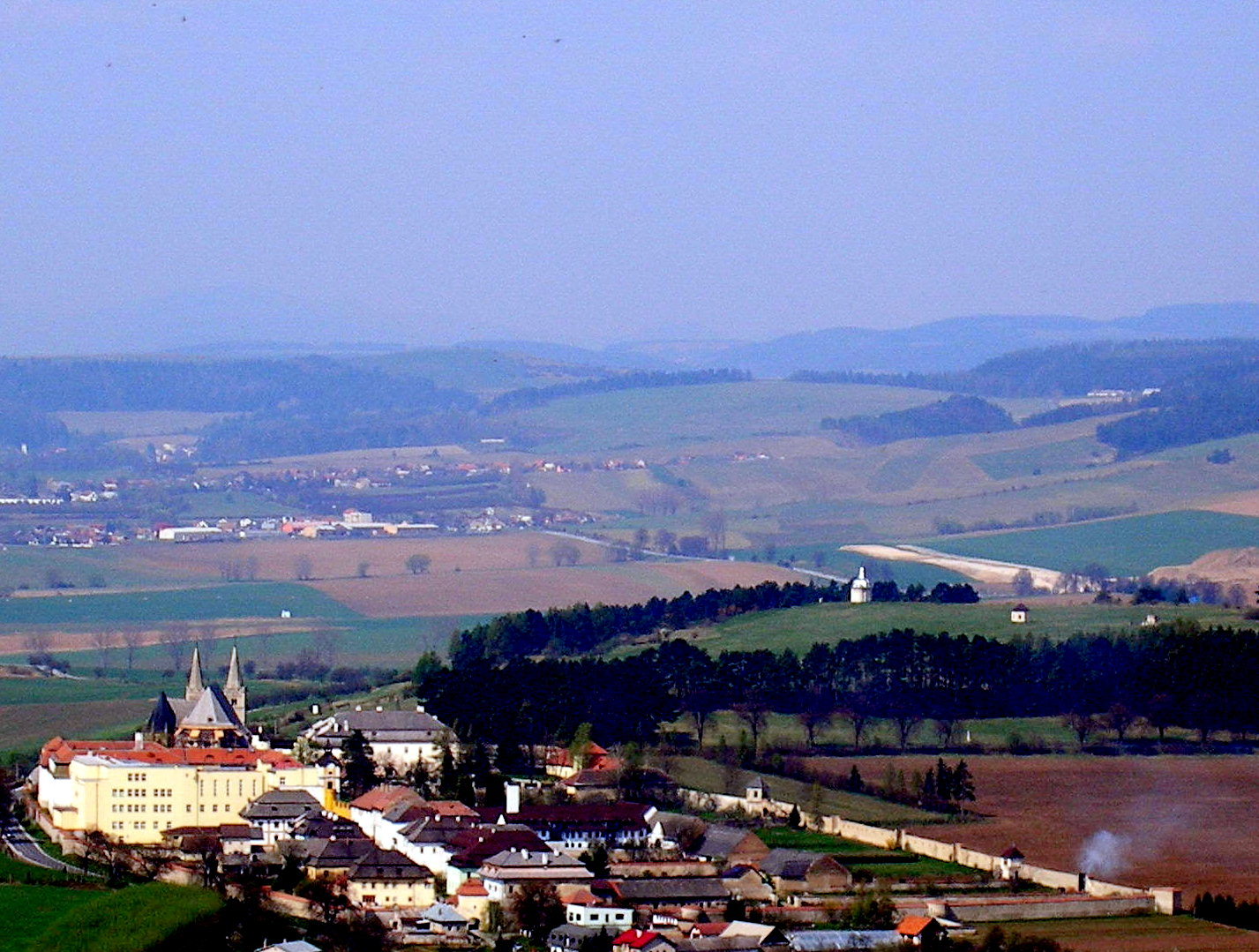

- Flag

- Location of Klčov in the Prešov Region Location of Klčov in Slovakia
- Coordinates: 49.00°N 20.67°E
- Country: Slovakia
- Region: Prešov Region
- District: Levoča District
- First mentioned: 1258

Area
  - Total: 7.33 km^{2} (2.83 sq mi)
- Elevation: 505 m (1,657 ft)

Population (2025)
  - Total: 674
- Time zone: UTC+1 (CET)
  - Summer (DST): UTC+2 (CEST)
- Postal code: 530 2
- Area code: +421 53
- Vehicle registration plate (until 2022): LE
- Website: www.obecklcov.sk/sk/

Klčov (Slovak pronunciation: [ˈkl̩tʂɔw]; Hungarian: Kolcsó) is a village and municipality in Levoča District in the Prešov Region of central-eastern Slovakia.

== History ==
In historical records the village was first mentioned in 1258.

== Geography ==
The municipality lies at an altitude of 505 metres (1,657 ft) and covers an area of 7.33 km^{2} (2.83 sq mi) (2025).

== Population ==
Population statistic (10 years)
Year	1995	2005	2015	2025
Count	530	555	634	674
Difference		+4.71%	+14.23%	+6.30%

Population statistic
Year	2024	2025
Count	665	674
Difference		+1.35%

It has a population of 674 people (31 December 2025).

=== Ethnicity ===
Census 2021 (1+ %)
Ethnicity	Number	Fraction
Slovak	620	98.41%
Not found out	11	1.74%
Romani	7	1.11%
Total	630	

In year 2021 was 630 people by ethnicity 620 as Slovak, 11 as Not found out, 7 as Romani, 2 as Czech, 2 as Rusyn and 1 as Italian.

Note on population: The difference values of population numbers in the table "Population statistic" and in the sections "Ethnicity" & "Religion" is caused by the use of various statistical methods.

=== Religion ===
Census 2021 (1+ %)
Religion	Number	Fraction
Roman Catholic Church	585	92.86%
None	27	4.29%
Not found out	10	1.59%
Total	630	

In year 2021 was 630 people by religion 585 from Roman Catholic Church, 27 from None, 10 from Not found out, 5 from Greek Catholic Church, 2 from Ad hoc movements and 1 from Paganism and natural spirituality.

== Genealogical resources ==
The records for genealogical research are available at the state archive "Statny Archiv in Levoca, Slovakia"

== See also ==
- List of municipalities and towns in Slovakia
