= Battle of Branyiszkó =

Battle during Hungarian Revolution of 1848

Coordinates: 49°01′03.6″N 20°51′25.1″E

- Part of the Hungarian Revolution of 1848
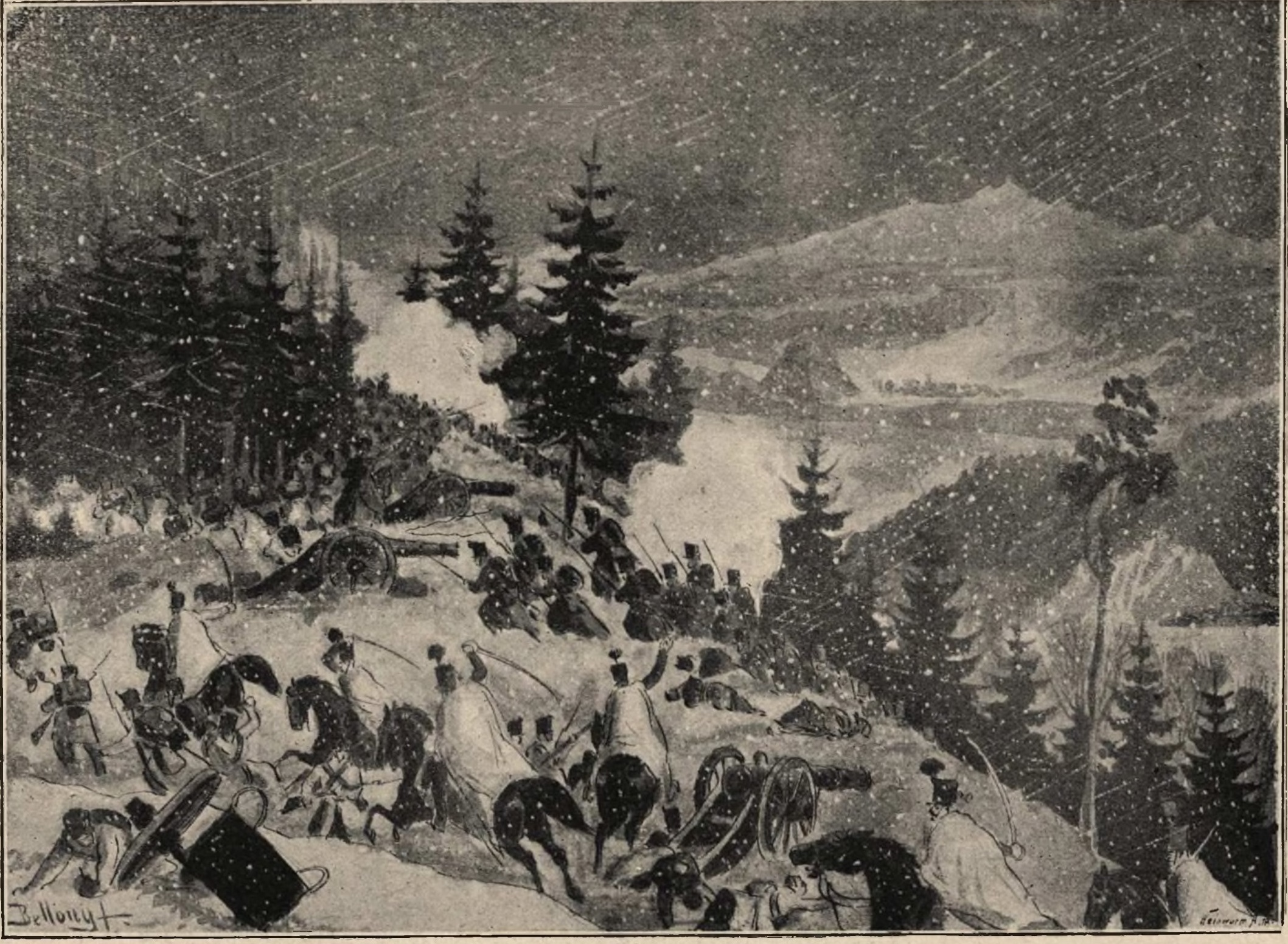
- Battle of Branyiszkó
Date	5 February 1849
Location	Branyiszkó pass, Sáros County, Kingdom of Hungary (now Branisko pass, Slovakia)
Result	Hungarian victory

Belligerents
Hungarian Revolutionary Army	Austrian Empire

Commanders and leaders
Richard Guyon	Franz Deym von Stritež

Strength
4,002 men 21 cannons	1,891 men 6 cannons

Casualties and losses
150 men	395 men

The Battle of Branyiszkó was a battle in the Hungarian war of Independence of 1848–1849, fought on 5 February 1849 between the revolutionary Hungarian division led by Colonel Richard Guyon against the detachment of the Austrian Empire led by Major General Franz Deym von Stritež, in the Pass of Branyiszkó. This was the last battle of the Hungarian Upper Danube Army retreat through Northern Hungary led by General Artúr Görgei, which was a diversion to lure as many Austrian troops as possible, in order to prevent the Austrian main army led by Field Marshal Alfred I, Prince of Windisch-Grätz from attacking the Hungarian headquarters and interim capital from Debrecen. In this battle, the Hungarian army led by Guyon broke through the 750 m high mountain pass, chasing away the Austrian troops which tried to defend it, allowing the army of Görgei to arrive in Eastern Hungary, then force, together with Colonel György Klapka Lieutenant General Franz Schlik to retreat from there.

== Background ==
On 2 January 1849, the Hungarian military council held in Pest decided to retreat from the capital without a fight and that the Hungarian army should begin to concentrate on the region of the Upper and Middle Tisza. In order to achieve this, they decided that the Hungarian troops from Bácska and Bánság must be evacuated, leaving only a weak force in the areas around Szeged and Szabadka. They concluded that after the retreat from Bánság, the line of the Maros must be held by the siege corps of Arad, Transylvania must be totally recovered to provide a rear for the concentration of the Hungarian armies, and the castles and fortresses in Hungarian hands, such as Komárom, Pétervárad, Eszék and Lipótvár, must be reinforced. The Corps of the Upper Tisza led by General Artúr Görgei must be reinforced to drive out or destroy the Austrian Corps led by General Franz Schlik which has invaded from the north. Artur Görgei, the commander of the Upper Danube Corps, suggested that only General Mór Perczel's reinforced corps and General Mihály Répásy's reserve corps should retreat directly towards the west, to Szolnok. The Upper Danube Corps, after the evacuation of the capital, had to march to Vác, then to the northwest, to relieve Lipótvár, and secure the mining towns after the evacuation of the garrison of the fortress. In addition, he had to lure after his troops as much enemy force as possible from the main theater to prevent Field Marshal Alfred I, Prince of Windisch-Grätz from attacking Debrecen, the seat of the Hungarian government. In order to achieve this Görgei had to give the impression to the Austrians that he wants to attack Vienna behind their back.

After the aforementioned diversion, the task of the Upper Danube Corps was to retreat through the mining towns (Kremnica (Körmöcbánya), Banská Štiavnica (Selmecbánya), Banská Bystrica (Besztercebánya), Nová Baňa (Újbánya), Pukanec (Bakabánya), Ľubietová (Libetbánya), Banská Belá (Bélabánya), Brezno (Breznóbánya) to the region of the Upper Tisza. The final goal was the concentration of the Hungarian troops at the region of the Upper and Middle Tisza: after the evacuation of Bácska and Bánság, General Antal Vetter calculated that 50,000 soldiers could be concentrated between Tokaj and Szolnok. After the retreat from the capital, Görgei turned north from Vác. Windisch-Grätz sent a corps of about 12,000 men in pursuit of Görgei's troops only on 7 January entrusting Lieutenant-General Anton Csorich with the pursuit. After the occupation of Vác, Csorich continued to follow the Upper Danube Corps with about 7,000 men. From Komárom, about 3,000 troops moved against the Görgei's corps, while Lieutenant General Christian Götz threatened the mining towns from the north.

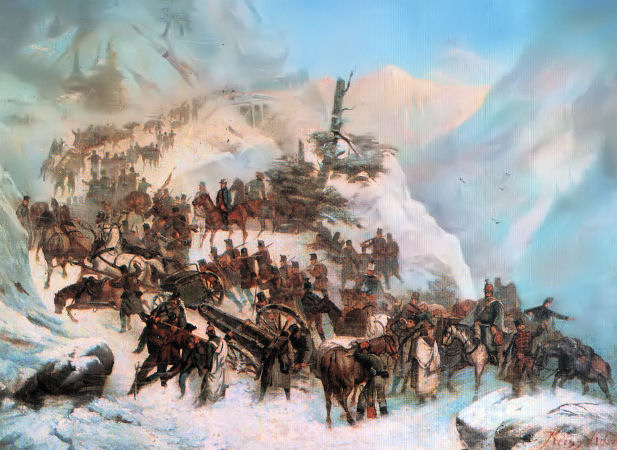
Görgei's troops crossing the Sturec pass

The Upper Danubian Army Corps had about 12,000 soldiers, reorganized at Vác and divided into four divisions, set out towards the besieged town of Lipótvár. On 11 January, the left wing of the Upper Danube Corps was at Komjáti, the right wing at Verebély, the center and headquarters at Léva, the rearguard at Ipolyság and Szántó. At Verebély, Colonel Lajos Aulich pushed back Simunich's outposts. Colonel Richard Guyon was attacked by Csorich at Ipolyság, and after repulsing the enemy, he retreated to Szántó. The next day, Lajos Beniczky, the government commissioner for the mining towns district, appeared at Görgei's headquarters and told him that he could not defend the mining towns against Götz with only 2,000 men at his disposal. Therefore, he asked Görgei to send him help or to march his army to the mining towns. Görgei, however, continued to consider the relief of Lipótvár as his more important goal. Major József Bayer, Görgei's Chief of Staff, also suggested that the corps should withdraw to the mining towns. He justified this by the fact that even if he succeeded in relieving Lipótvár, the corps would be threatened by the main forces of the K.u.K. troops sent in pursuit from the east. And if it would have not succeeded, the corps would have been squeezed between the enemy troops. Some of the enemy's main forces had already been diverted by Görgei's corps from the attack toward the new Hungarian power base at the Tisza River. But the road to the mining towns was open for only one more day. The army had time to rest there for a few days and save the precious metal and other supplies from there from falling into the Austrian's hands.

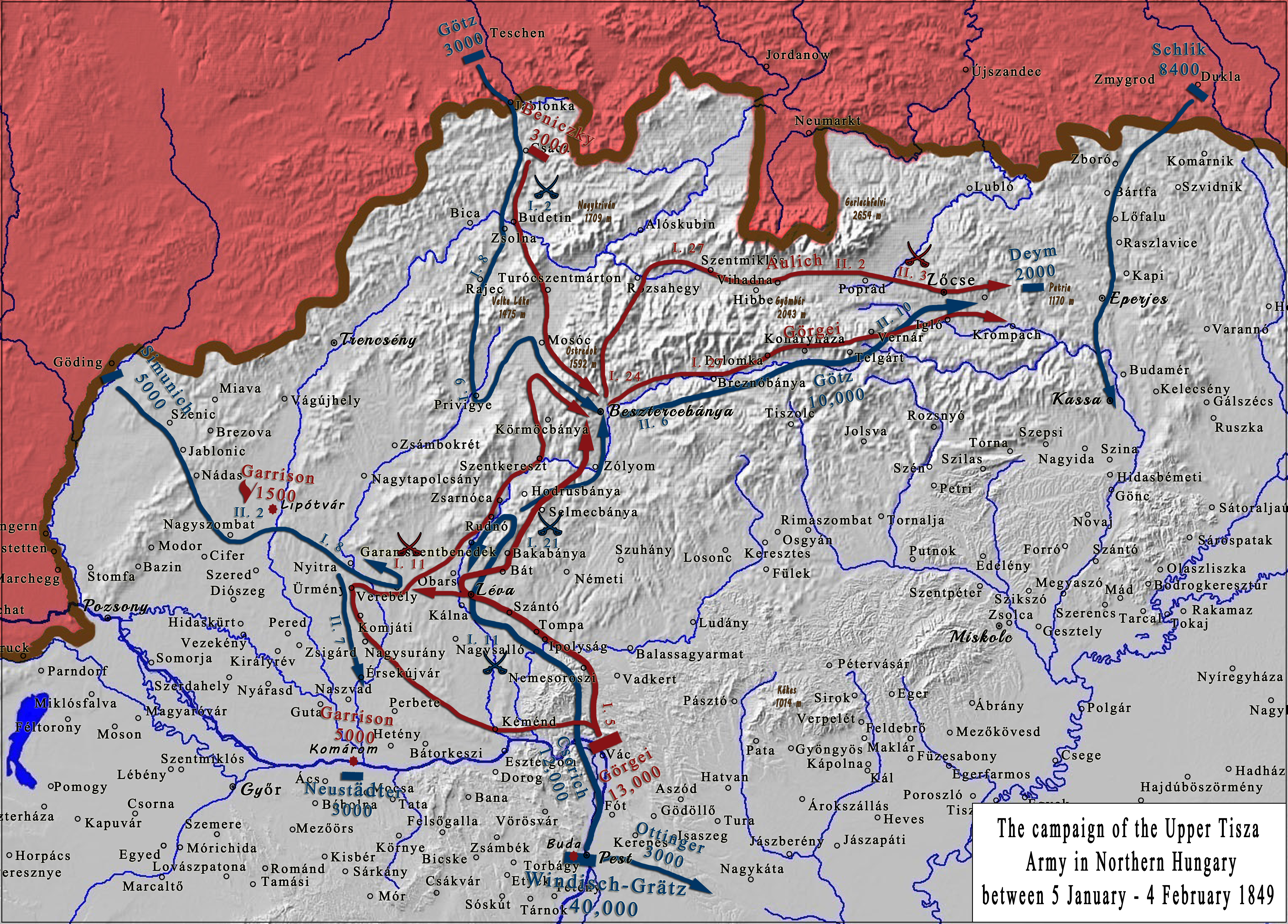
Map of the campaign of the Upper Danube Army in Northern Hungary between 5 January and 4 February 1849. Red: Hungarians, or an event concerning them, Blue: Austrians, or an event concerning them, Crossed swords: battle with the color of the winner, Flag pointing down: surrender of Lipótvár fortress to the Austrians

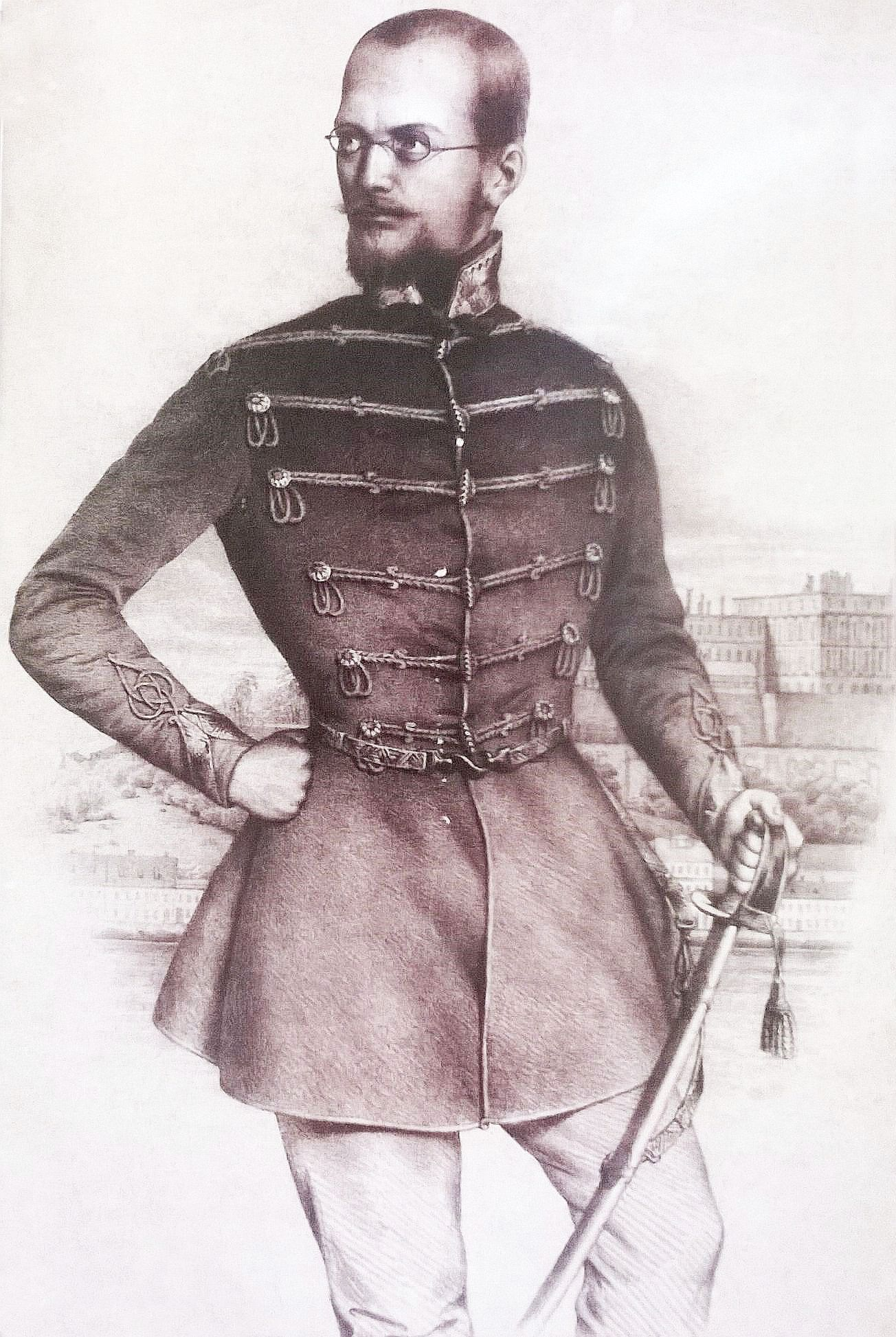
Görgei Artúr

Görgei was in danger. Major General Christian Götz's troops could occupy the mining towns from the north and Csorich's troops from the south, and attack Görgei with a combined force. He, therefore, ordered his divisions to march. Aulich had to march to Körmöcbánya, Colonel János Piller to Zólyom and Lieutenant Colonel György Kmety to Selmecbánya. Guyon had to take up defensive positions at Szélakna (today part of Selmecbánya). The execution of orders did not go without a fight. Kmety clashed with one of Csorich's detachments. Götz was about to capture Körmöcbánya, but Aulich repulsed him. On 21 January, Csorich also went on the offensive and pushed Guyon back to Selmecbánya. Later that day, Guyon retreated to Besztercebánya. On 20 January, Görgei learned that an Austrian column was advancing up the Garam valley. For the moment he was calm, because he knew that a battalion was stationed in Žarnovica (Zsarnóca). He hoped it would hold off the forces threatening Guyon's right flank. It soon became clear that the battalion commander, who had the duty to defend the Zsarnóca, had not even attempted to take a position there. So Görgei set off with the battalion in question, some cavalry, and cannons to Zsarnóca. When he arrived there, he learned that the enemy had already crossed the village and was heading for Selmecbánya through the Hodrusbánya valley. Görgei caught up with and attacked the enemy detachment, but in the Battle of Hodrusbánya his troops were put to flight. Görgei then withdrew his troops to Körmöcbánya, where he learned of Guyon's defeat in the Battle of Szélakna the previous day. The Imperial troops occupied Selmecbánya and remained there until 24 January.

Aulich's division at Körmöcbánya was threatened with annihilation by Csorich's troops from the south and Götz's from the north. But Görgei found a way to unite his troops. Between Körmöcbánya and Besztercebánya, under the Szkalka Mountain, there was a collapsed old mine tunnel. Görgei and Aulich dug out and shored up the tunnel, and the division could march through it to Besztercebánya. Guyon's and Piller's divisions arrived here by crossing the flooded Garam. Görgei, after reorganizing the troops, withdrew his corps in two columns from Besztercebánya. Görgei led the northern column, which started in the Vág valley towards Kassa. The southern column, consisting of Guyon's and Piller's divisions, retreated down the Garam valley. The columns had to meet before the Branyiszkó pass. The north column reached Lőcse without any particular difficulty. On 25 January, Csorich's two brigades headed back to Pest, and only Major General Götz and Felix Jablonowski followed the southern column of the Upper Danube Corps. On 2 February, Guyon's division rested at Igló. Guyon had not posted outposts, and the Imperial garrison from Lőcse attacked his troops by surprise during the night. However, Guyon soon got his troops in order and drove the attackers out of the town.

== Prelude ==
Görgei, suffering from a hot fever due to the fatigue of leading his troops by three weeks of continuous retreat in the mountain passes during the harsh winter, spent three days in bed at Vichodna in sickness, and so only on February 3 he arrived at Poprád, where he received a report on the Battle of Igló, and on the same day he traveled on to Lőcse; where he learned that the Austrian column pursuing him was alarmingly close to his troops. He now had to decide quickly between two alternatives: either to make his way through the occupied Branyiszkó pass at the cost of a battle or to retreat southwards with his army through the valley of the Sajó River, avoiding confrontation. Görgei chose the former because with this northern detour, he could cut off the route of Lieutenant General Franz Schlik, who was near Kassa, to Galicia. He also thought that a victorious battle would be good for his troops' morale, who were suffering from many retreats and Austrian raids. He left the capture of the Branyiszkó Pass, which was the gateway to Eperjes and Kassa, to Guyon, who had fought rather unsuccessful battles in the retreat to northern Hungary, giving him the opportunity to make amends for his mistakes.

According to the Hungarian writer Kálmán Mikszáth: A characteristic habit of Artur Görgei had an even stronger psychological basis when he wanted to make a bold military action, usually he did not entrust it to his officers or subordinates, who were freshly laurelled [carried out successful military actions], but to the defeated, to those who had previously experienced some failure, thinking that in them the desire to repair the suffered damage with something great was most alive, and Görgei was not disappointed.

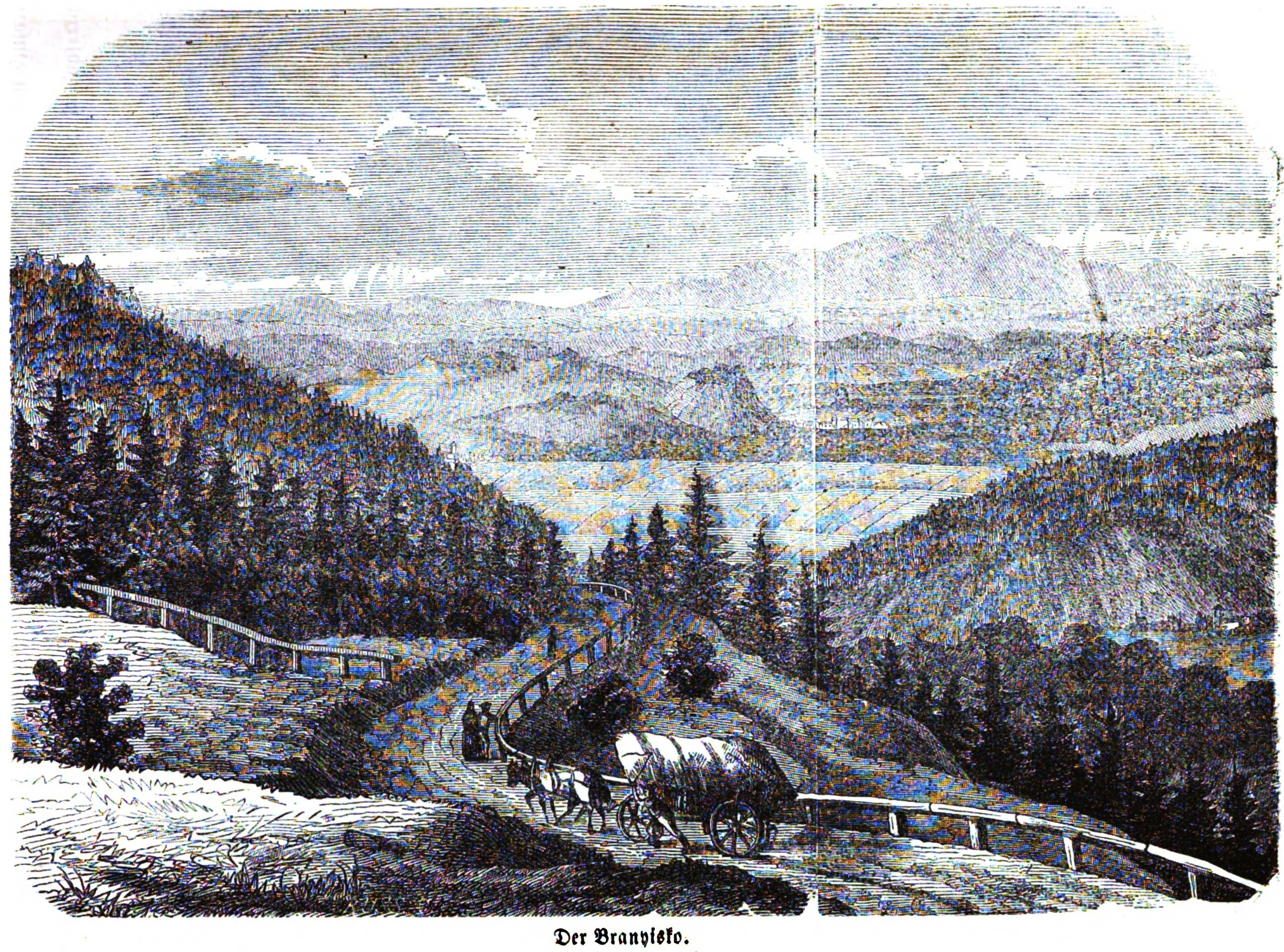
Branyiszkó pass

At the same time, Kmety had to demonstrate in the Hornád valley towards Krompachy (Korompa). Piller's division was sent to Spišské Podhradie (Szepesváralja) for possible support of Guyon, but did not take part in the following day's fighting, while Aulich's division was left in the Poprád valley for the time being. On 4 February, on the eve of the decisive battles from the end of February and the following Spring, the officers of the Simonyi column and the corps headquarters, stationed at Lőcse, organized a ball on Görgei's orders to boost the morale of the officers.

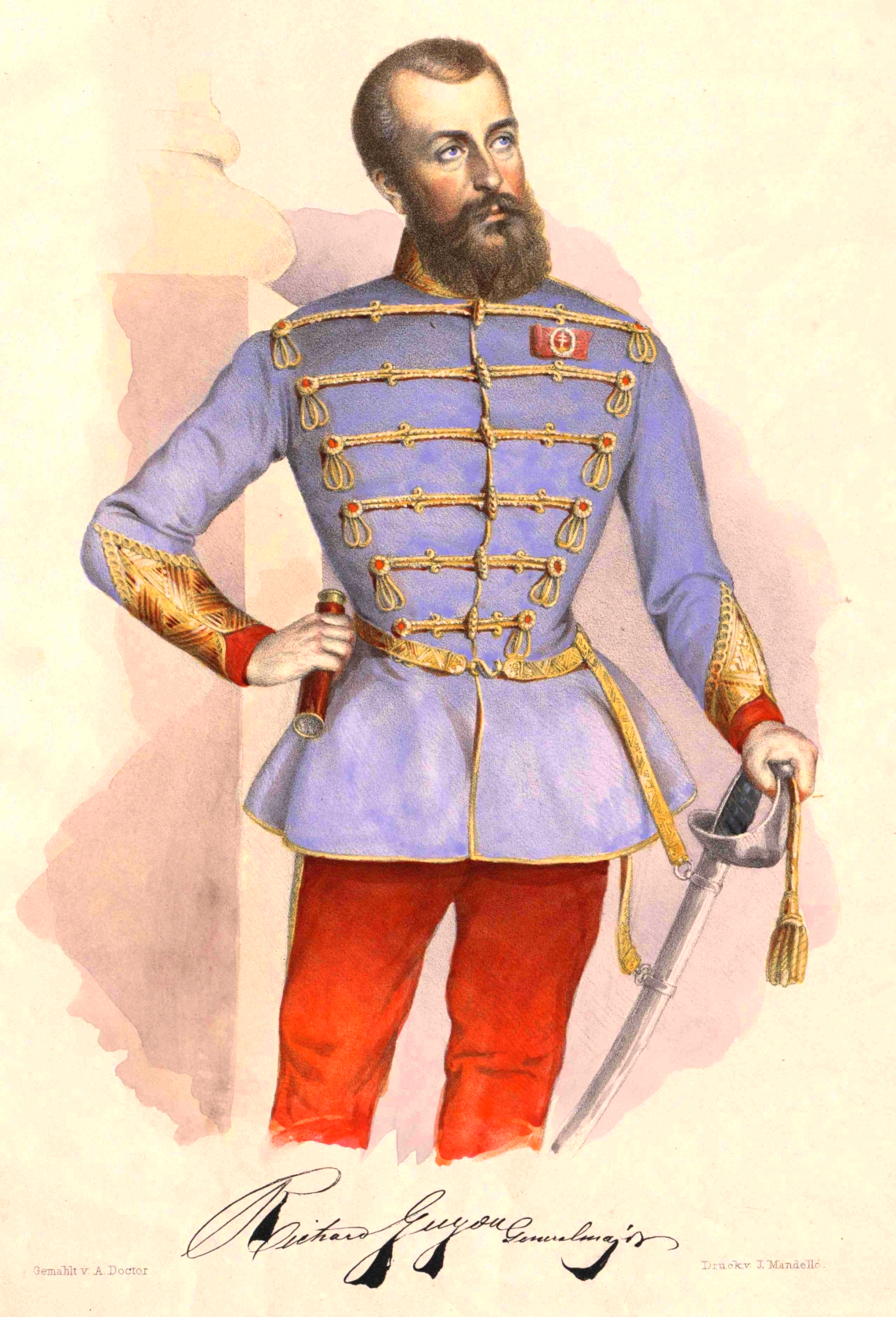
Guyon Richard1

During that time at Branyiszkó, Guyon was preparing for the battle. The natural features of the Branyiszkó pass made it an excellent defense place. Its thirteen hairpin bends, its narrow paths, and the steep terrain all favored the defenders, who tried to fortify the pass, which already served as a natural fortress, with barricades.

Under the command of General Deym, 2 infantry battalions, 1 cavalry company, a total of 1891 men, 265 horses, and six guns defended the Branyiszkó stronghold. Deym, with 1 1/2 battalions and 4 guns, occupied the pass itself, the narrow serpentine road being barricaded in 22 places, but in order to avoid being surrounded, he also tried to occupy the side roads, forest paths and gorges near the pass, hence the ridges on either side of the pass were occupied by a 1/2 battalion. The cavalry company and 2 guns were deployed in reserve to the rear. The bulk of the Austrian troops had taken positions on the height of the mountain, sheltered from the thicket of the forest, while their advance guard occupied the lower elevations, where a barn close by offered them a favorable defensive position; their guns, which were placed somewhat higher up the middle of the mountain, dominated the whole road. Despite this, the Austrian defensive stance was not impeccable, with the unfortunate result that Deym's occupation of the byways left him with not enough troops to defend the pass in the best way. Deym's troops, however, were battle-hardened, and accustomed to success, while Guyon had many untried troops, including a battalion of mostly Highland Slovaks that had been recruited barely two weeks ago.

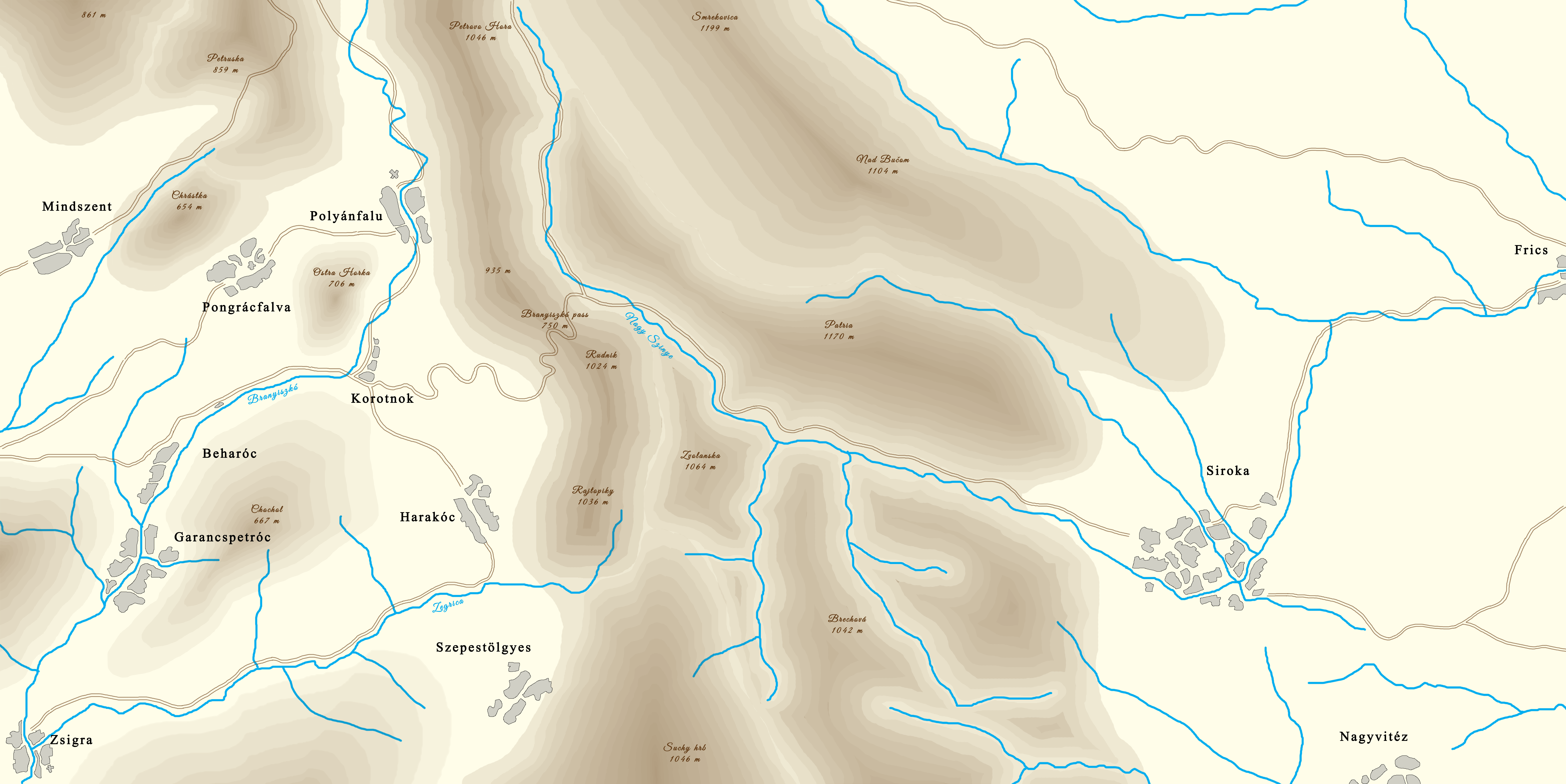
The Branyiszkó mountain range

Guyon already had data on the situation of the enemy forces stationed in Szepesség. He was visited by Ludwig Cornides, the mining engineer and mayor of Gölnicbánya. Cornides was of Zipser Germans (Saxon) from North Hungary. Already on 27 January, he visited Guyon at Koháryháza and brought him a report on the number and location of enemy troops in Szepesség. It was an extremely dangerous spy service, and Cornides returned home in temperatures of minus 20-25 degrees.

The Guyon division set out from Szepesváralja early in the morning of 5 February for Branyiszkó, so that by 9 a.m. it had reached Korotnok at the entrance to the Pass, where it immediately deployed its six-pounder battery. The Guyon Division, which had been sent to take Branyiszkó, was at this time divided into the Üchtritz and Szodtfriedt Brigades and consisted of the 13th and 33rd Honvéd battalions, 1 battalion of volunteers from Nógrád, 2 battalions newly formed in the mining towns, 1 company of the Ujházy jägers, 2 companies of sappers, 2 companies of cavalry and 21 guns, with a total of 4002 men and 307 horses.

That Monday was bone-chilling cold, with the thermometer dipping below minus 22.5 degrees Celsius. To take the edge off the cold and give them courage, Guyon stopped with his soldiers at the local tavern to drink some Pálinka. While the drinks were being served outside, Guyon was inside dictating the victory report to his aide-de-camp, 19-year-old First Lieutenant Gyula Tipula, leaving only the casualties and date section blank. The adjutant was surprised at this, at which the colonel looked at the 785-meter-high Branyiszkó, from which one could cross from the Szepesség to Sáros county, and said in English: Damn me if I don’t get over it!

Guyon divided his troops into three groups: in the middle, the 33rd "ködmön wearing" (Hungarian sheepskin waistcoat) Honvéd Battalion from Szeged, led by Major Pethő, followed by the 13th (Zemplén Green Belted) Honvéd Battalion and the 2nd Battalion of the Besztercebánya Regiment of Rookies attacked from the front, while the sappers and Ujházy jägers advancing from Szepesváralja on side roads were directed to the enemy's left, and the Nógrád battalion, under Major Kompolthy, to his right; the rest of the brigade remained in reserve behind the central column.

=== Opposing forces ===
Hungarian troops:

Guyon division:

- Szodtfriedt brigade:

- 2nd Besztercebánya (later 124th) honvéd battalion = 710 soldiers;
- 13th honvéd battalion = 960 soldiers;
- 33rd honvéd battalion = 1,040 soldiers;
- 2 companies of the 1st sapper battalion = 196 soldiers;
- Újházy jägers = 76 soldiers;
- six-pounder infantry battery from Pozsony and Komárom = 98 soldiers, 63 horses, 7 cannons;

Brigade total: 3,040 soldiers, 63 horses, 7 cannons.

- Üchritz brigade:

- Nógrád (later 62nd) honvéd battalion = 680 soldiers;
- 1 company of the 12th (Nádor) hussar regiment = 83 soldiers, 83 horses;
- 5th cavalry battery = 84 soldiers, 64 horses, 6 cannons;
- 6th cavalry battery = 115 soldiers, 97 horses, 8 cannons;

Brigade total: 962 soldiers, 244 horses, 14 cannons.

Division total: 4,002 soldiers, 307 horses, 21 cannons.

Austrian troops:

- Deym brigade

- Landwehr battalion of the 24th (Parma) infantry regiment = 985 soldiers;
- 3rd battalion of the 30th (Nugent) infantry regiment = 661 soldiers;
- 1 company of the 1st (Kaiser Ferdinand) chevau-léger regiment = 125 soldiers, 125 horses;
- Artillery = 120 soldiers, 140 horses, 6 cannons;

Brigade total: 1,891 soldiers, 265 horses, 6 cannons.

== Battle ==
Guyon led the column attacking from the front, and, as he did not speak Hungarian well, he addressed the following speech to them, interspersing Hungarian and German words: Vorwärts dupla lénung, rückwärts kartács schiessen. Which in English means something like: “If you go forward, you get double pay, if you retreat, I'll receive you with grapeshots”'. However the attack led by the 33rd Honvéd Battalion was soon repulsed, because the Hungarian cannons, positioned near Korotnok, could not be effectively support the infantry, being on a much lower ground than the attacking soldiers. When the Honvéds retreated, they found themselves confronted by Guyon's cannons, who fulfilled his vow and fired into them, leaving one officer and 10 soldiers dead or wounded. Guyon's center was then contented with a stationary artillery duel until the columns sent against the enemy's right and left and partly in its rear, appeared on the mountaintops surrounding the pass. Then, at about 3 p.m., the 33rd Honvéd Battalion renewed its attack, but this did not go smoothly either.

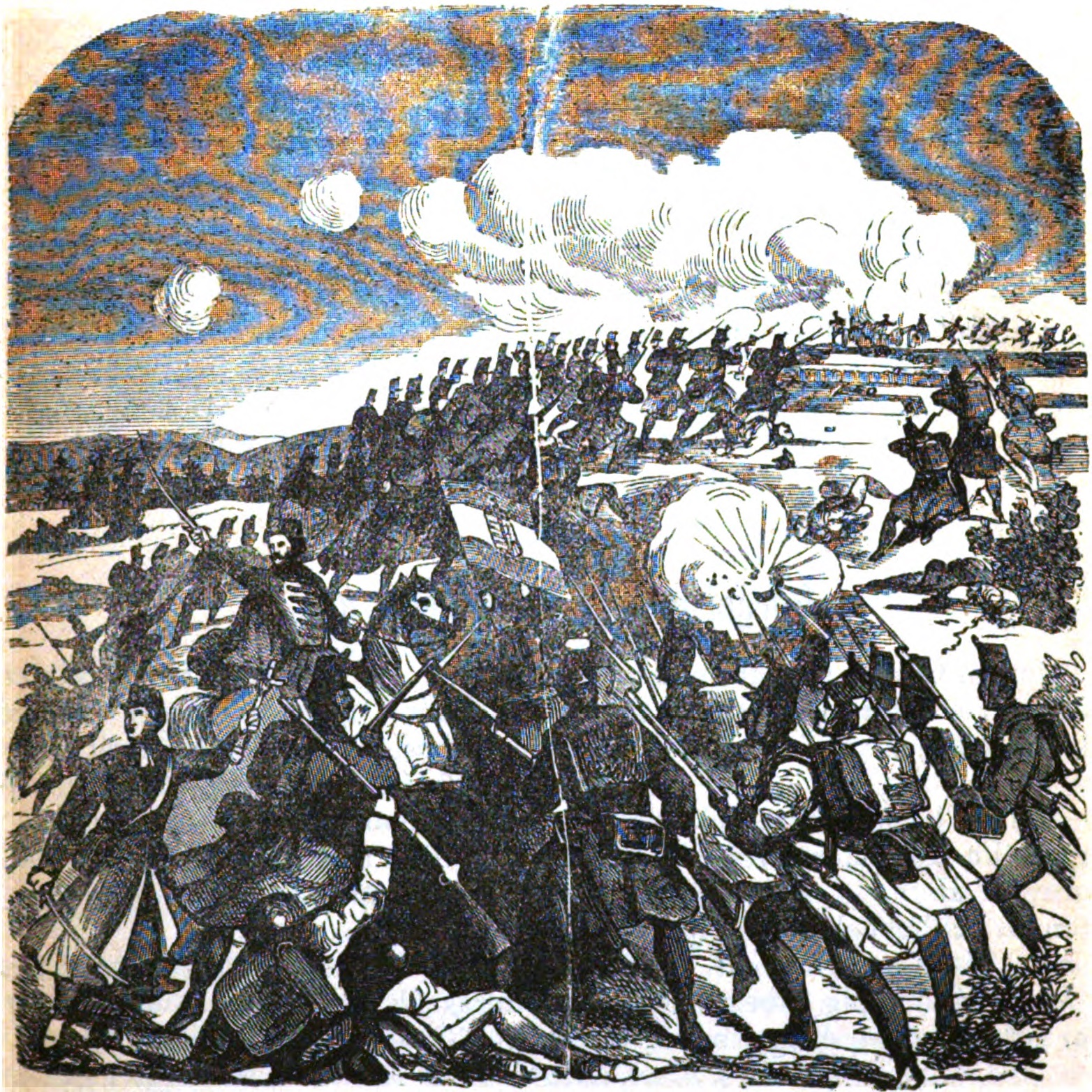
Battle of Branyiszkó

He was also assisted by the Piarist friar Imre Poleszni (Erdősi), who encouraged the Slovak nationality soldiers of the Zólyom County rookie battalion. And when the attack stalled, Father Erdősi threw the one meter-long cross he was carrying into the snow in front of him, and shouted to the soldiers in Slovak: "Come on, my sons! Would you leave the Lord to these heathens?" That was enough to make the soldiers turn around, climb the barricades, and force the imperials to retreat.

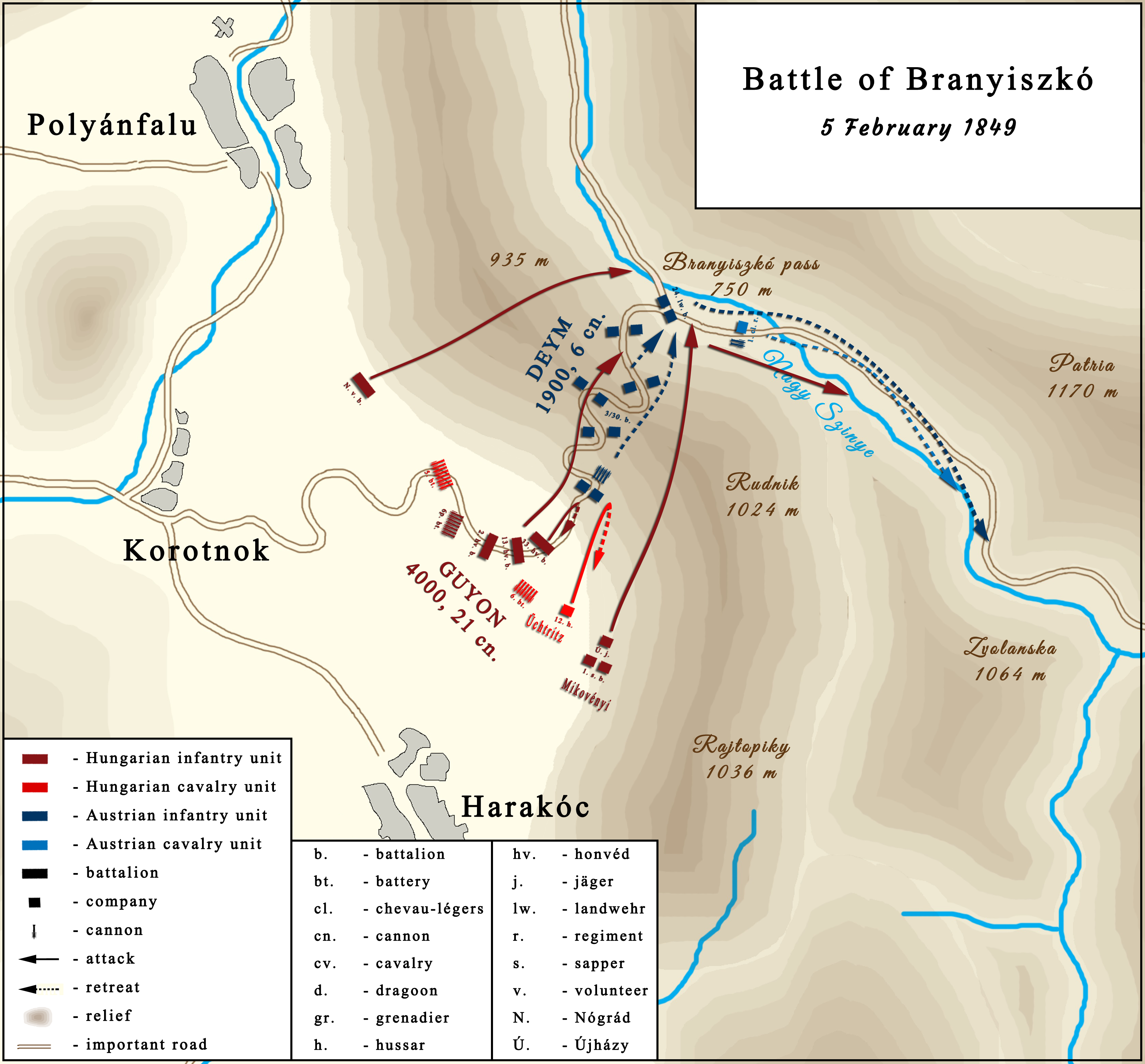
Map of the battle of Branyiszkó 5 February 1849

With the self-sacrificing resistance of the 2 companies from the reserve, the Austrians retreated towards the top of the Branyiszkó pass, fighting heroically from one barricade to the other, defending every inch of ground. A company of the 12th Nádor Hussar Regiment, recruited from the Jászkun region also took part in the attack. The hussars, storming on the steep mountain road, were met by a hail of grapeshot and were forced to retreat. One of the wounded hussars then cried out: May Christ damn this twisted [mountainious] country, because here the hussars can do nothing [the cavalry cannot fight by climbing steep mountains]! Their commander, Baron Emil Üchtritz, realizing that the cavalry was useless up the steep pass, left his hussars behind, and under the guidance of a local guide, took with him three regimental trumpeters, a company of Tyrolean and two companies of Újházy jägers, a squadron of sappers on a detour to Polyanóc, where they climbed the steep cliffs to the Ördöglyuk (Devil's Hole) plateau, from where the final Austrian defensive position could be attacked from the flank. They took a roundabout route, playing jäger marches on the trumpets every 10 minutes, thus giving Deym the impression that a large jäger force was trying to surround him.

Lieutenant Colonel Emil Üchtritz described this battle trick in his memoirs as follows: I ordered three Hussar trumpeters to dismount, and the 2nd Besztercebánya battalion under the command of Major Mikovényi [Károly] to advance with 300 men on the left flank, along the front line into the forest, while blowing the jäger march, so that later the astonished enemy officers asked me where I had taken so many Tyrolean jägers who were advancing so terribly fast on the left flank and causing their own men to retreat in panic. Well, you help yourself as best you can (...).

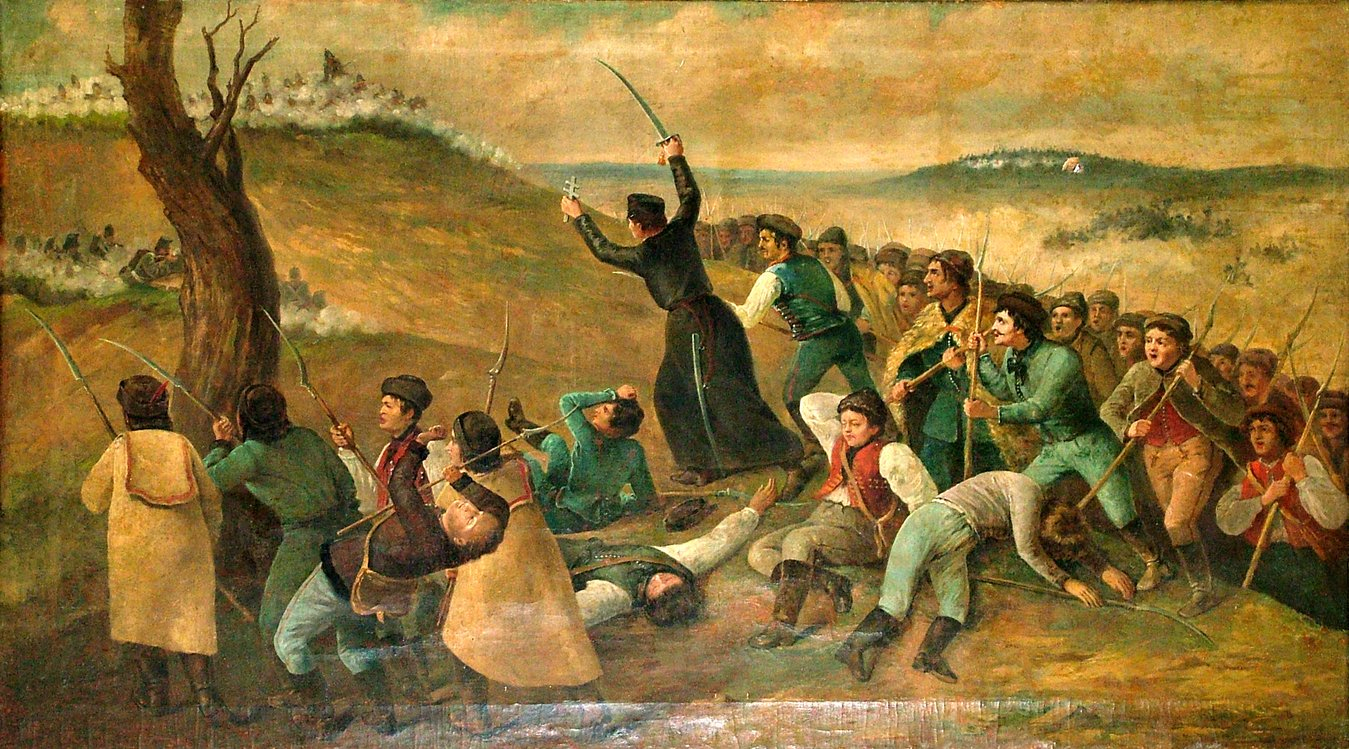
Priest Erdősi Imre leading the attack – Alajos Stech, 1880

Jäger officer Rezső Tirts describes their flank attack against the final Austrian position on the plateau as follows: But now all at once there was a loud crack of rifles from the Devil's Hole. It was the flank attack of the Újházy jägers, to which six hussar trumpeters blew the jäger march. One after another, their well-aimed shots dropped the artillerymen on the hill. At this moment the Piller Brigade also arrived with swift steps on the battlefield from Szepesváralja and rushed up the hill to the sound of all the drums. All this had an inspiring effect on the Honvéds, and a crushing effect on the Austrians, whose ranks began to waver. Then the Honvéds rushed out of the woods with their bayonets [pointed at the enemy], crying 'Forward! Forward!' from a thousand and a thousand throats, so that it could be heard all the way to Korotnok. The Austrians were in a panic, their ranks broke up, cannons, horses, men, all the Austrian troops went on a wild and disorderly run down the other slope, and at 4 o'clock in the afternoon, on the top of the Branyiszkó Pass, on the little hill near the Chvala Bohu ['Praise God' in Slovak] tavern, the Hungarian flag, raised by the Újházy jägers, proclaimed one of the most beautiful Hungarian victories. Several Austrian chevau-légers trapped in the tavern were taken prisoner by a hussar with the nickname Csősz Bácsi (Uncle Field-guard), after he went in and asked the tavern keeper for a drink. Another factor in the Austrian rout was that Major General Deym did not want to press the pass's defense any further, because his troops were flanked by the encircling Hungarian units.

== Aftermath ==
Deym retreated through Siroka towards Eperjes, where, after 13 hours of uninterrupted marching, his troops arrived at half past 1 in the morning and joined the Schulzig column, which Schlik had meanwhile sent there in support. The pursuing Guyon retired with his division at 2 o'clock after midnight at Siroka. Guyon was then also called "the English lion" or "the hero of Branyiszkó", and was promoted to the rank of Major General and awarded the 2nd class of the Hungarian Military Medal. The 33rd Battalion also got a share of the glory: it received a flag ribbon from Görgei, bearing the inscription "Branyiszko / 5 February 1849", embroidered, according to tradition, by the general's wife.

During the battle, thirty kilometers away, Görgei, stationed in Lőcse, arranged a ball for his soldiers and officers. Kálmán Mikszáth commemorated the event as follows: Perhaps at the very moment the courier [with the news about the victory at Brnayiszkó] was leaving, the ball given by the handsome officers to the beautiful flaxen-haired ladies of Lőcse began. Görgei gladly gave permission for such entertainments, because they not only entertained the officers (the poor boys deserved it) but also underlined the attachment of the Honvéds to the local population. However, Görgei did not promise to attend the ball. He was speechless that whole day, perhaps nervous if the brilliant Hungarian leader had any nerves. Finally, at midnight, he appeared and went to the orchestra, which stopped playing the Cotillion and started to play the military alarm. The dancers bowed to their ladies, suddenly girded on their swords, and stood among the assembling troops in the street after a few minutes.[...] The officers shouted: forward to Branyiszkó! Half an hour before Görgei received Guyon's victory report, to the great sorrow of the poor girls of Lőcse... After all, the world would not have collapsed if that foolish courier had brought it in the morning! But war is such a cruel thing.

On the morning of 6 February, Lieutenant General Schulzig, having united the column which had retreated from Branyiszkó with his own, withdrew towards Kassa between 7 and 8 o'clock that same morning. On the way, the lieutenant-general met Schlick at Szentpéter, who, on hearing of Görgei's advance, hurried with his whole corps towards Kassa, and ordered Schulzig's army back first to Lemes and then to the even better position at Budamér. Now the Upper Danube Corps went from the defense to the offensive. On 6 February, Görgei was already in Eperjes, and on the 10th he reached Kassa, which Schlik had evacuated the day before. From there, he issued orders for the next day, 7 February, according to which the Aulich division, already on its way from the Poprad valley, was to advance to Hedri, crossing the Branyiszkó pass; Piller's division was ordered to join Guyon at Eperjes, and Kmety's division remained at Korompa in the Hornád valley and did not advance even when the three Austrian companies of the Otočac border guards from Kluknó retreated on news of the loss of Branyiszkó.

The battle of Branyiszkó had high stakes for both sides. If the Upper Danube army succeeded in breaking through, it could have trapped and destroyed Schlik's corps in cooperation with the Upper Tisza Corps led by General György Klapka, approaching from the south. If the breakthrough did not succeed, Görgeit was in danger of being cornered by the two pursuing Imperial-Royal brigades and Schlik's corps. (Although, even then, it could have slipped away from them on the Hornád valley towards Kassa.)

The Upper Danube Corps essentially won the Highland campaign, as it deterred the enemy from attacking the Tisza line for weeks, prevented the enemy from taking possession of northern Hungary, and with its unexpected appearance forced Schlik to retreat from the northeastern counties of Hungary. On the other hand, what seemed to be a possible great success, the encirclement of Schlik's corps was not achieved, and thanks to the actions of the newly appointed Hungarian commander-in-chief, Lieutenant General Henryk Dembiński, Schlik's corps slipped through the Hungarian troops' grasp with relatively small losses.

== Sources ==
- Alleker, Lajos (1894), Erdősi Imre, a branyiszkói hőspap emlékezete ("The Memory of Imre Erdősi, the Hero-Priest of Branyiszkó") (PDF) (in Hungarian), Nyitra
- Bánlaky, József (2001). A magyar nemzet hadtörténelme (The Military History of the Hungarian Nation) (in Hungarian). Budapest: Arcanum Adatbázis.
- Babucs, Zoltán (2021), "Branyiszkó bevétele ("The Capture of Branyiszkó")", Magyarságkutató Intézet, 5 February 2021 (in Hungarian), archived from the original on 8 May 2023
- Bánlaky, József (2001). A magyar nemzet hadtörténelme (The Military History of the Hungarian Nation) (in Hungarian). Budapest: Arcanum Adatbázis.
- Bóna, Gábor, ed. (1999). The Hungarian Revolution and War of Independence. A Military History. War and Society in East Central Europe. Vol. XXXV. Translated by Arató, Nóra. Atlantic Research and Publications, Inc. ISBN 0-88033-433-9.
- Gelich, Richárd (1883). Magyarország függetlenségi harcza 1848-49-ben ("The War of Independence of Hungary in 1848-49, vol. 1) (in Hungarian). Pest: Aigner Lajos.
- Hermann, Róbert (2004), Az 1848–1849-es szabadságharc nagy csatái ("Great Battles of the Hungarian Revolution of 1848 – 1849") (in Hungarian), Zrínyi, ISBN 963-327-367-6
- Hermann, Róbert (2013). Nagy csaták. 15. A magyar önvédelmi háború ("Great Battles. 15. The Hungarian War od Self Defense") (in Hungarian). Budapest: Duna Könyvklub. p. 88. ISBN 978-615-5013-99-7.
- Rüstow, Friedrich Wilhelm (1866). Az 1848-1849-diki magyar hadjárat története, II. kötet ("The History of the Hungarian Campaign from 1848-1849, vol. 2.) (in Hungarian). Pest: Emich Gusztáv.
- Süli, Attila (2020), "Egy elterelő hadművelet története - Branyiszkó, 1849 február 5 ("The Story of a Diversion Tactic - Branyiszkó, 5 February 1849")", Ars Militaria, 22 May 2020 (in Hungarian)
- Veres, István (2021), "Bálozás a magyar szabadságharc alatt ("Balls During the Hungarian War of Independence")", Vasárnap.com, 23 February 2021 (in Hungarian)
