= Široké =

- Municipality
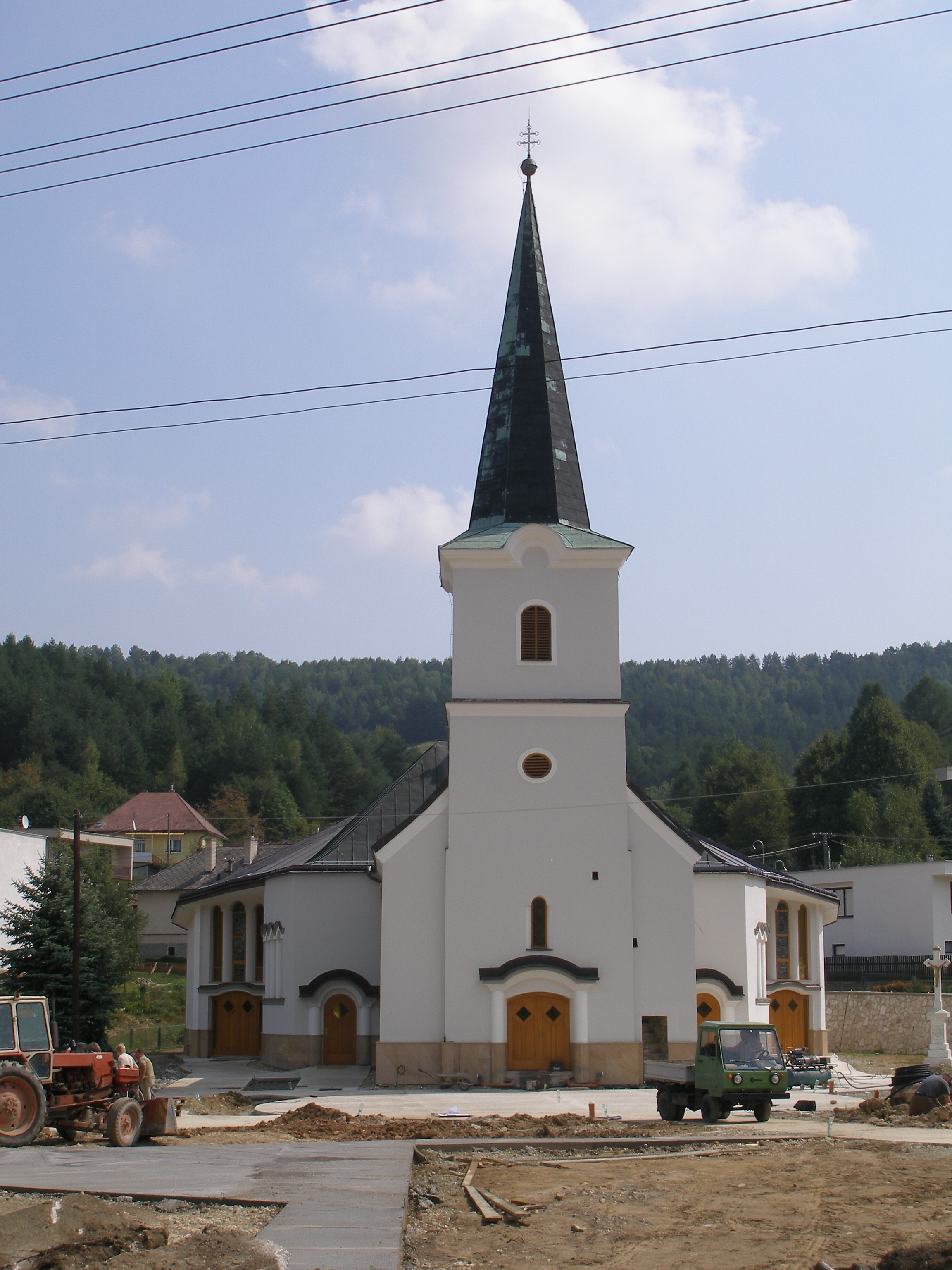

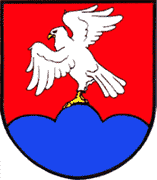
- Flag Coat of arms

- Location of Široké in the Prešov Region Location of Široké in Slovakia
- Coordinates: 49.00°N 20.93°E
- Country: Slovakia
- Region: Prešov Region
- District: Prešov District
- First mentioned: 1320

Government
  - Mayor: Stanislav Bartoš(2013-2022

Area
  - Total: 25.78 km^{2} (9.95 sq mi)
- Elevation: 562 m (1,844 ft)

Population (2025)
  - Total: 2,450
- Time zone: UTC+1 (CET)
  - Summer (DST): UTC+2 (CEST)
- Postal code: 823 7
- Area code: +421 51
- Vehicle registration plate (until 2022): PO
- Website: www.siroke.sk

Široké (Hungarian: Siroka) is a village and municipality in Prešov District in the Prešov Region of eastern Slovakia.

== History ==
In historical records, the village was first mentioned in 1320.

== Geography ==
The municipality lies at an altitude of 562 metres (1,844 ft) and covers an area of 25.78 km^{2} (9.95 sq mi) (2025).

== Population ==
Population statistic (10 years)
Year	1995	2005	2015	2025
Count	2251	2302	2474	2450
Difference		+2.26%	+7.47%	−0.97%

Population statistic
Year	2024	2025
Count	2445	2450
Difference		+0.20%

It has a population of 2450 people (31 December 2025).

=== Ethnicity ===
Census 2021 (1+ %)
Ethnicity	Number	Fraction
Slovak	2367	97.16%
Not found out	70	2.87%
Total	2436	

In year 2021 was 2436 people by ethnicity 2367 as Slovak, 70 as Not found out, 8 as Rusyn, 5 as Czech, 2 as Hungarian, 2 as Other, 1 as Ukrainian, 1 as Romani and 1 as Moravian.

Note on population: The difference values of population numbers in the table "Population statistic" and in the sections "Ethnicity" & "Religion" is caused by the use of various statistical methods.

=== Religion ===
Census 2021 (1+ %)
Religion	Number	Fraction
Roman Catholic Church	2234	91.71%
None	92	3.78%
Not found out	60	2.46%
Total	2436	

In year 2021 was 2436 people by religion 2234 from Roman Catholic Church, 92 from None, 60 from Not found out, 23 from Greek Catholic Church, 10 from Evangelical Church, 7 from Other, 2 from Eastern Orthodox Church, 2 from Jehovah's Witnesses, 2 from Christian Congregations in Slovakia, 2 from Ad hoc movements, 1 from Buddhism and 1 from Apostolic Church.
