= Santovka =

Santovka Szántó
- Municipality
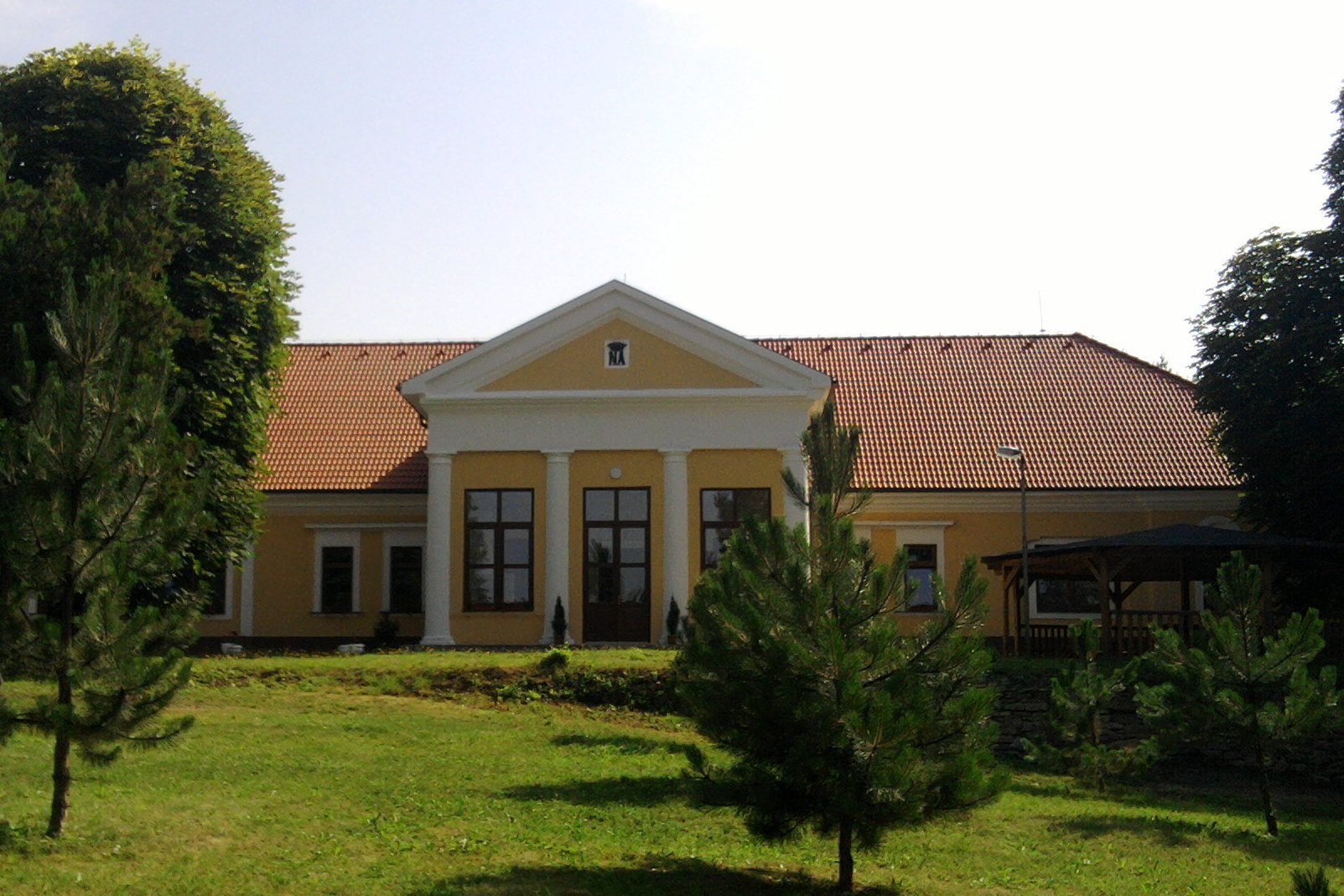

- Flag

- Location of Santovka in the Nitra Region Location of Santovka in Slovakia
- Coordinates: 48.15°N 18.77°E
- Country: Slovakia
- Region: Nitra Region
- District: Levice District
- First mentioned: 1276

Area
  - Total: 17.86 km^{2} (6.90 sq mi)
- Elevation: 160 m (520 ft)

Population (2025)
  - Total: 649
- Time zone: UTC+1 (CET)
  - Summer (DST): UTC+2 (CEST)
- Postal code: 935 87
- Area code: +421 36
- Vehicle registration plate (until 2022): LV
- Website: www.santovka.sk

Santovka (Hungarian: Szántó) is a village and municipality in the Levice District in the Nitra Region of Slovakia.

== History ==
In historical records the village was first mentioned in 1276.

== Geography ==
The municipality lies at an altitude of 160 metres (520 ft) and covers an area of 17.86 km^{2} (6.90 sq mi) (2025).

== Population ==
Population statistic (10 years)
Year	1995	2005	2015	2025
Count	897	822	681	649
Difference		−8.36%	−17.15%	−4.69%

Population statistic
Year	2024	2025
Count	655	649
Difference		−0.91%

It has a population of 649 people (31 December 2025).

=== Ethnicity ===
Census 2021 (1+ %)
Ethnicity	Number	Fraction
Slovak	589	89.37%
Hungarian	37	5.61%
Not found out	24	3.64%
Romani	13	1.97%
Total	659	

In year 2021 was 659 people by ethnicity 589 as Slovak, 37 as Hungarian, 24 as Not found out, 13 as Romani, 6 as Other, 5 as Czech, 3 as Albanian, 2 as Italian and 2 as Rusyn.

Note on population: The difference values of population numbers in the table "Population statistic" and in the sections "Ethnicity" & "Religion" is caused by the use of various statistical methods.

=== Religion ===
Census 2021 (1+ %)
Religion	Number	Fraction
Roman Catholic Church	428	64.95%
None	141	21.4%
Evangelical Church	37	5.61%
Not found out	24	3.64%
Greek Catholic Church	10	1.52%
Total	659	

In year 2021 was 659 people by religion 428 from Roman Catholic Church, 141 from None, 37 from Evangelical Church, 24 from Not found out, 10 from Greek Catholic Church, 6 from Ad hoc movements, 5 from Calvinist Church, 3 from Baptists Church, 1 from Jewish community, 1 from Old Catholic Church, 1 from Christian Congregations in Slovakia, 1 from Islam and 1 from Buddhism.

== Facilities ==
The village has a public library a swimming pool, a gym and a football pitch. It also has a pharmacy and doctor's surgery, general stores and supermarkets.
