= Hendrichovce =

- Municipality
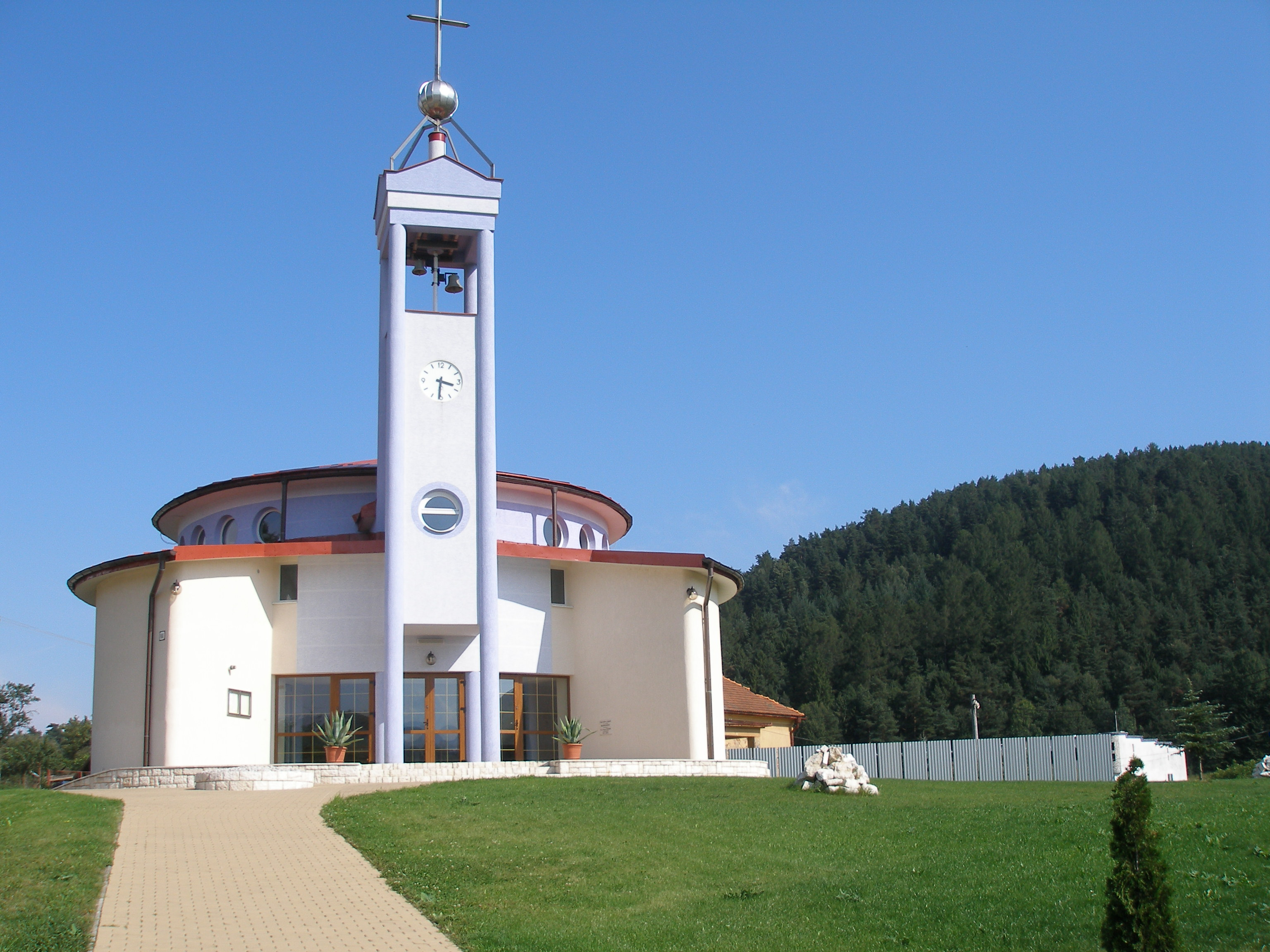

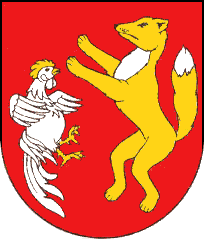
- Flag Coat of arms

- Location of Hendrichovce in the Prešov Region Location of Hendrichovce in Slovakia
- Coordinates: 49.02°N 21.00°E
- Country: Slovakia
- Region: Prešov Region
- District: Prešov District
- First mentioned: 1320

Area
  - Total: 4.22 km^{2} (1.63 sq mi)
- Elevation: 427 m (1,401 ft)

Population (2025)
  - Total: 286
- Time zone: UTC+1 (CET)
  - Summer (DST): UTC+2 (CEST)
- Postal code: 082 35
- Area code: +421 51
- Vehicle registration plate (until 2022): PO
- Website: www.hendrichovce.sk

Hendrichovce (Hungarian: Hedri) is a village and municipality in Prešov District in the Prešov Region of eastern Slovakia.

== History ==
In historical records the village was first mentioned in 1320. In the Middle Ages it belonged to the Aba family. The Roman Catholic church of St Stephen dates from the second half of the 14th century and was rebuilt in the Baroque style in 1753. A former manor house was rebuilt as a Neoclassical mansion in 1832.

== Geography ==
The municipality lies at an altitude of 427 metres (1,401 ft) and covers an area of 4.22 km^{2} (1.63 sq mi) (2025).

== Population ==
Population statistic (10 years)
Year	1995	2005	2015	2025
Count	219	217	244	286
Difference		−0.91%	+12.44%	+17.21%

Population statistic
Year	2024	2025
Count	287	286
Difference		−0.34%

It has a population of 286 people (31 December 2025).

=== Ethnicity ===
Census 2021 (1+%)
Ethnicity	Number	Fraction
Slovak	259	99.23%
Not found out	5	1.91%
Total	261	

In year 2021 was 261 people by ethnicity 259 as Slovak, 5 as Not found out and 2 as Other.

Note on population: The difference values of population numbers in the table "Population statistic" and in the sections "Ethnicity" & "Religion" is caused by the use of various statistical methods.

=== Religion ===
Census 2021 (1+%)
Religion	Number	Fraction
Roman Catholic Church	241	92.34%
None	12	4.6%
Not found out	4	1.53%
Total	261	

In year 2021 was 261 people by religion 241 from Roman Catholic Church, 12 from None, 4 from Not found out, 2 from Greek Catholic Church, 1 from Old Catholic Church and 1 from Eastern Orthodox Church.

== Genealogical resources ==
The records for genealogical research are available at the state archive "Statny Archiv in Presov, Slovakia".

- Roman Catholic church records (births/marriages/deaths): 1788–1895 (parish B)
- Greek Catholic church records (births/marriages/deaths): 1834–1895 (parish B)
- Lutheran church records (births/marriages/deaths): 1753–1895 (parish B)

== See also ==
- List of municipalities and towns in Slovakia
