= Vagrinec =

Village in Slovakia

- Municipality
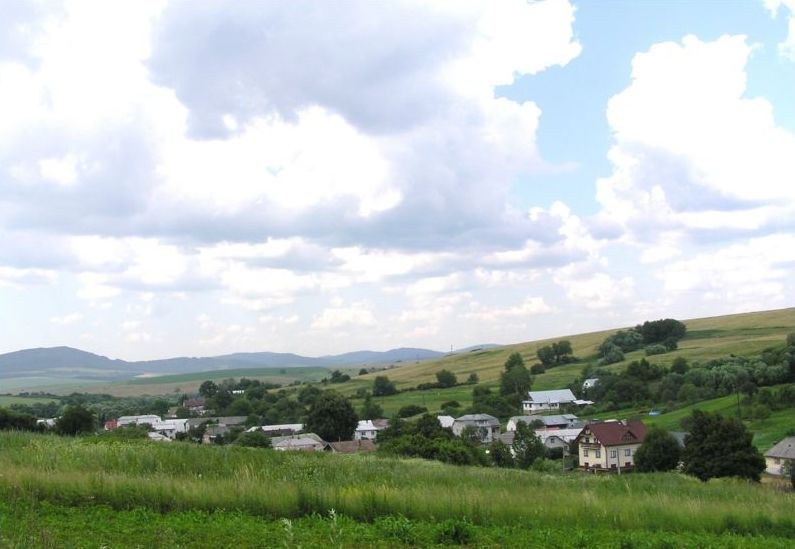

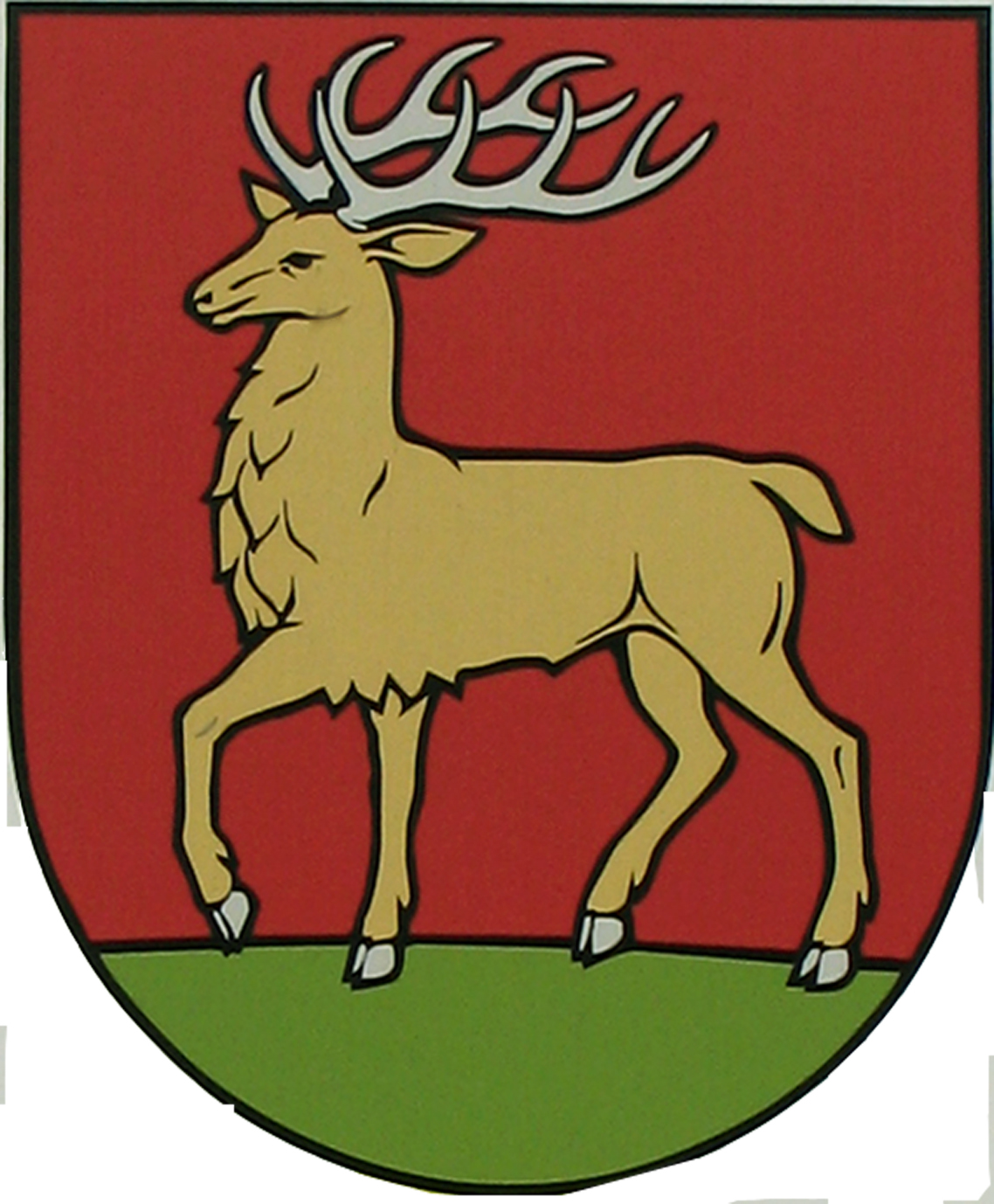
- Flag Coat of arms

- Location of Vagrinec in the Prešov Region Location of Vagrinec in Slovakia
- Coordinates: 49.32°N 21.63°E
- Country: Slovakia
- Region: Prešov Region
- District: Svidník District
- First mentioned: 1548

Area
  - Total: 5.52 km^{2} (2.13 sq mi)
- Elevation: 269 m (883 ft)

Population (2025)
  - Total: 119
- Time zone: UTC+1 (CET)
  - Summer (DST): UTC+2 (CEST)
- Postal code: 900 3
- Area code: +421 54
- Vehicle registration plate (until 2022): SK
- Website: www.obecvagrinec.sk

Vagrinec (Hungarian: Felsővargony, until 1899: Vagrinyecz) is a village and municipality in Svidník District in the Prešov Region of north-eastern Slovakia.

== History ==
In historical records the village was first mentioned in 1548.

== Geography ==
The municipality lies at an altitude of 269 metres (883 ft) and covers an area of 5.52 km^{2} (2.13 sq mi) (2025).

== Population ==
Population statistic (10 years)
Year	1995	2005	2015	2025
Count	134	126	123	119
Difference		−5.97%	−2.38%	−3.25%

Population statistic
Year	2024	2025
Count	118	119
Difference		+0.84%

It has a population of 119 people (31 December 2025).

=== Ethnicity ===
Census 2021 (1+ %)
Ethnicity	Number	Fraction
Slovak	88	75.86%
Rusyn	76	65.51%
Not found out	4	3.44%
Total	116	

In year 2021 was 116 people by ethnicity 88 as Slovak, 76 as Rusyn and 4 as Not found out.

Note on population: The difference values of population numbers in the table "Population statistic" and in the sections "Ethnicity" & "Religion" is caused by the use of various statistical methods.

=== Religion ===
Census 2021 (1+ %)
Religion	Number	Fraction
Greek Catholic Church	70	60.34%
Eastern Orthodox Church	36	31.03%
None	7	6.03%
Roman Catholic Church	2	1.72%
Total	116	

In year 2021 was 116 people by religion 70 from Greek Catholic Church, 36 from Eastern Orthodox Church, 7 from None, 2 from Roman Catholic Church and 1 from Not found out.
