= Hrabovčík =

- Municipality
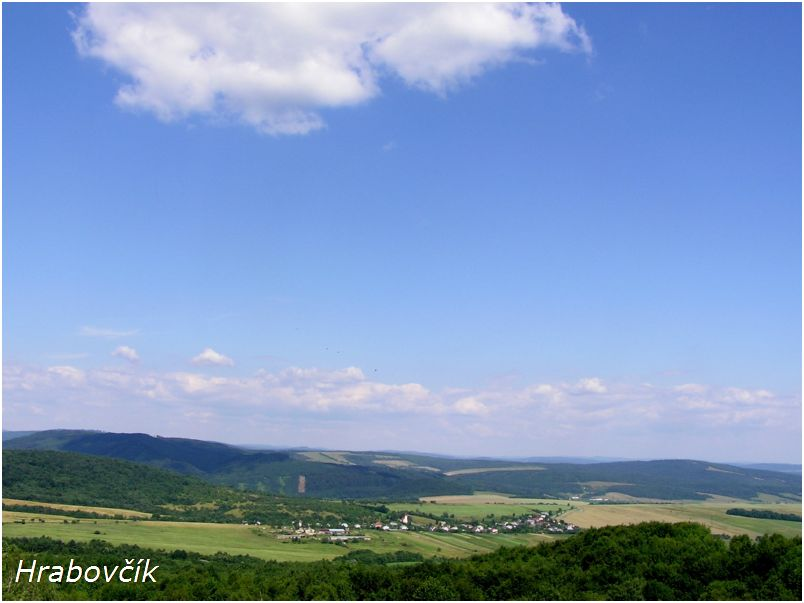

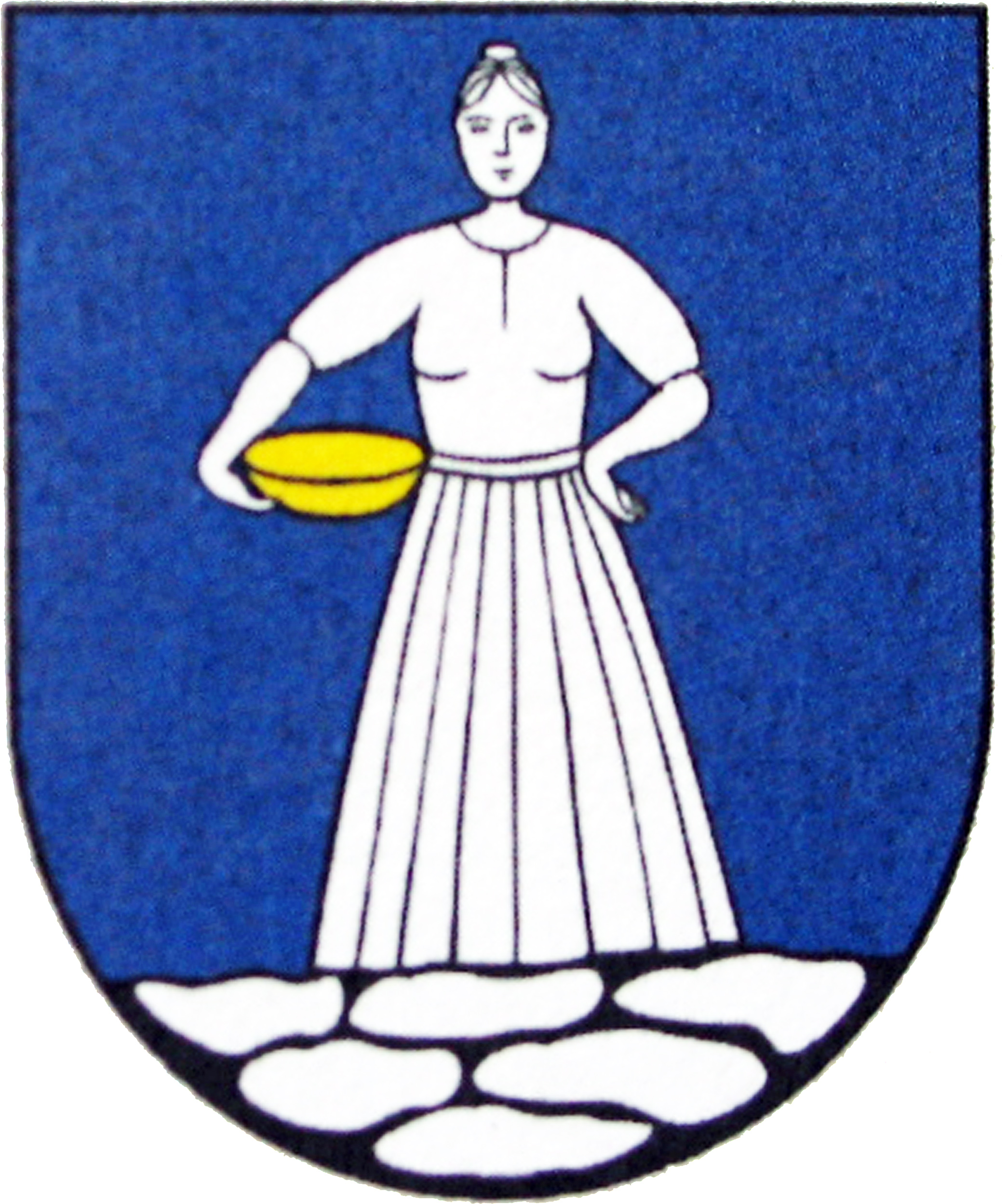
- Flag Coat of arms

- Location of Hrabovčík in the Prešov Region Location of Hrabovčík in Slovakia
- Coordinates: 49.28°N 21.57°E
- Country: Slovakia
- Region: Prešov Region
- District: Svidník District
- First mentioned: 1548

Area
  - Total: 7.10 km^{2} (2.74 sq mi)
- Elevation: 264 m (866 ft)

Population (2025)
  - Total: 321
- Time zone: UTC+1 (CET)
  - Summer (DST): UTC+2 (CEST)
- Postal code: 904 1
- Area code: +421 54
- Vehicle registration plate (until 2022): SK
- Website: www.hrabovcik.sk

Hrabovčík (Hungarian: Gyertyánpatak, until 1899: Hrabovcsik; Rusyn: Грабівчік) is a village and municipality in Svidník District in the Prešov Region of north-eastern Slovakia.

== History ==
In historical records, the village was first mentioned in 1548.

== Geography ==
The municipality lies at an altitude of 264 metres (866 ft) and covers an area of 7.10 km^{2} (2.74 sq mi) (2025).

== Population ==
Population statistic (10 years)
Year	1995	2005	2015	2025
Count	292	337	336	321
Difference		+15.41%	−0.29%	−4.46%

Population statistic
Year	2024	2025
Count	322	321
Difference		−0.31%

It has a population of 321 people (31 December 2025).

=== Ethnicity ===
Census 2021 (1+ %)
Ethnicity	Number	Fraction
Slovak	286	86.93%
Rusyn	131	39.81%
Ukrainian	8	2.43%
Not found out	6	1.82%
Total	329	

In year 2021 was 329 people by ethnicity 286 as Slovak, 131 as Rusyn, 8 as Ukrainian, 6 as Not found out, 1 as Czech and 1 as Other.

Note on population: The difference values of population numbers in the table "Population statistic" and in the sections "Ethnicity" & "Religion" is caused by the use of various statistical methods.

=== Religion ===
Census 2021 (1+ %)
Religion	Number	Fraction
Greek Catholic Church	266	80.85%
Eastern Orthodox Church	36	10.94%
Roman Catholic Church	18	5.47%
None	5	1.52%
Total	329	

In year 2021 was 329 people by religion 266 from Greek Catholic Church, 36 from Eastern Orthodox Church, 18 from Roman Catholic Church, 5 from None, 3 from Not found out and 1 from Jehovah's Witnesses.

== Genealogical resources ==
The records for genealogical research are available at the state archive "Statny Archiv in Presov, Slovakia"

- Roman Catholic church records (births/marriages/deaths): 1775-1895 (parish B)
- Greek Catholic church records (births/marriages/deaths): 1870-1895 (parish A)

== See also ==
- List of municipalities and towns in Slovakia
