= Nižná Jedľová =

- Municipality
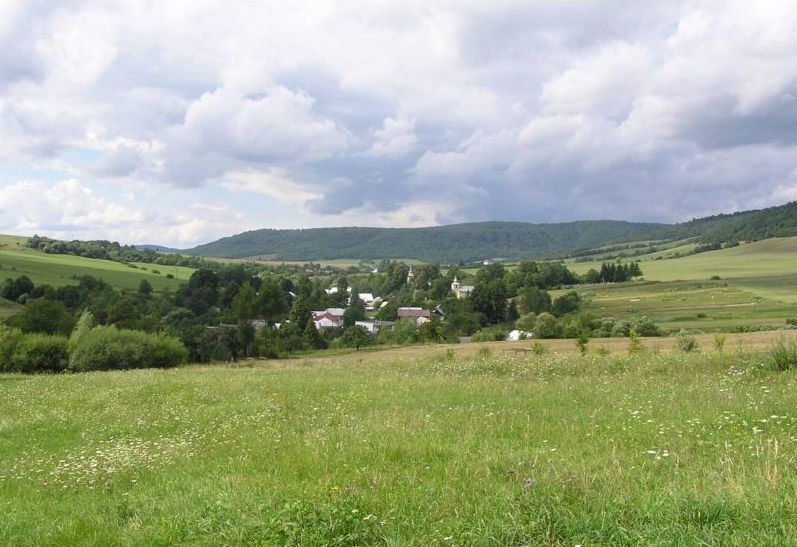

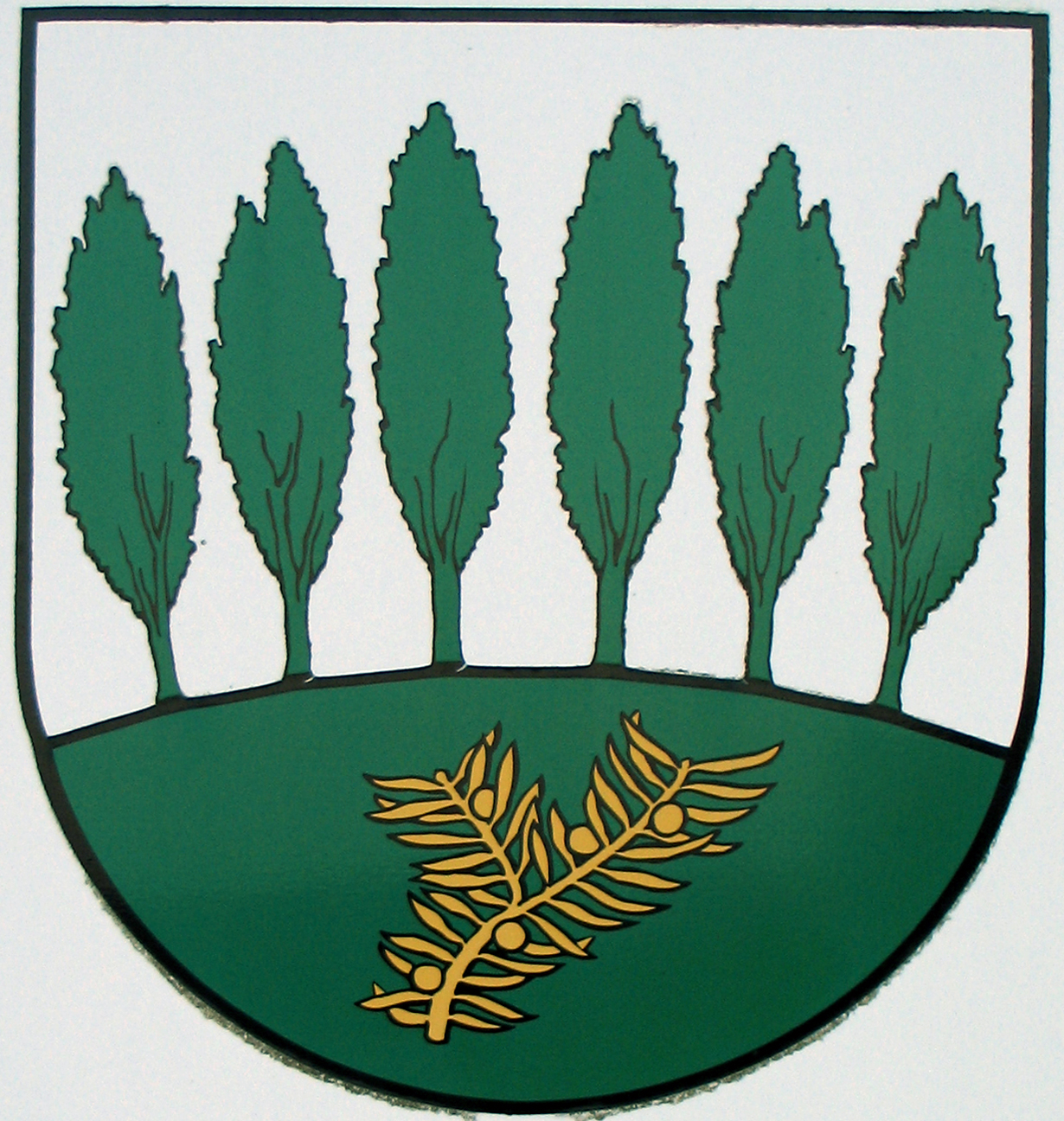
- Flag Coat of arms

- Location of Nižná Jedľová in the Prešov Region Location of Nižná Jedľová in Slovakia
- Coordinates: 49.34°N 21.56°E
- Country: Slovakia
- Region: Prešov Region
- District: Svidník District
- First mentioned: 1572

Area
  - Total: 4.74 km^{2} (1.83 sq mi)
- Elevation: 286 m (938 ft)

Population (2025)
  - Total: 100
- Time zone: UTC+1 (CET)
  - Summer (DST): UTC+2 (CEST)
- Postal code: 890 1
- Area code: +421 54
- Vehicle registration plate (until 2022): SK
- Website: www.niznajedlova.sk

Nižná Jedľová (Rusyn: Нижня Ядлова; Hungarian: Alsófenyves, until 1899: Alsó-Jedlova) is a village and municipality in Svidník District in the Prešov Region of north-eastern Slovakia.

== History ==
In historical records the village was first mentioned in 1572.

== Geography ==
The municipality lies at an altitude of 286 metres (938 ft) and covers an area of 4.74 km^{2} (1.83 sq mi) (2025).

== Population ==
Population statistic (10 years)
| Year | 1995 | 2005 | 2015 | 2025 |
|---|---|---|---|---|
| Count | 71 | 88 | 85 | 100 |
| Difference | | +23.94% | −3.40% | +17.64% |

Population statistic
| Year | 2024 | 2025 |
|---|---|---|
| Count | 98 | 100 |
| Difference | | +2.04% |

It has a population of 100 people (31 December 2025).

=== Ethnicity ===
Census 2021 (1+ %)
| Ethnicity | Number | Fraction |
|---|---|---|
| Slovak | 70 | 67.3% |
| Rusyn | 61 | 58.65% |
| Ukrainian | 2 | 1.92% |
| Not found out | 2 | 1.92% |
| Total | 104 | |

In year 2021 was 104 people by ethnicity 70 as Slovak, 61 as Rusyn, 2 as Ukrainian and 2 as Not found out.

Note on population: The difference values of population numbers in the table "Population statistic" and in the sections "Ethnicity" & "Religion" is caused by the use of various statistical methods.

=== Religion ===
Census 2021 (1+ %)
| Religion | Number | Fraction |
|---|---|---|
| Eastern Orthodox Church | 73 | 70.19% |
| Greek Catholic Church | 17 | 16.35% |
| None | 10 | 9.62% |
| Roman Catholic Church | 4 | 3.85% |
| Total | 104 | |

In year 2021 was 104 people by religion 73 from Eastern Orthodox Church, 17 from Greek Catholic Church, 10 from None and 4 from Roman Catholic Church.
