= Miroľa =

- Municipality
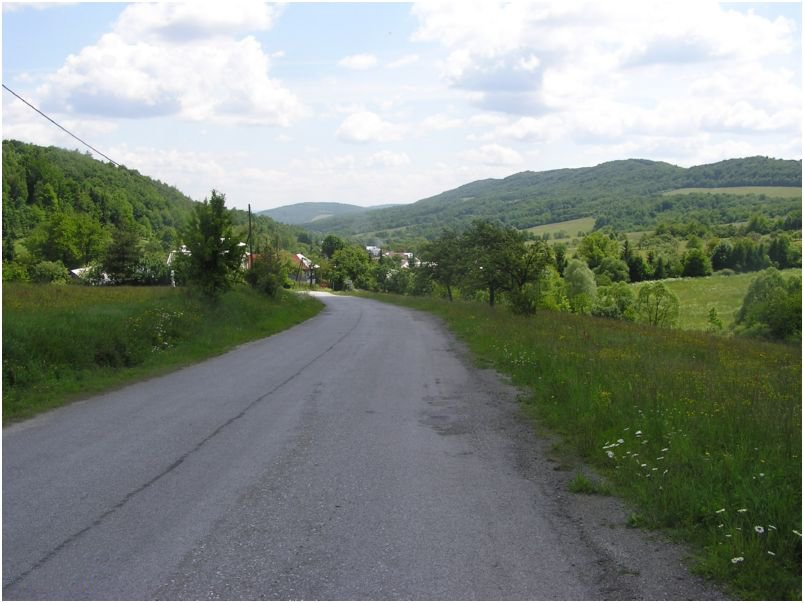

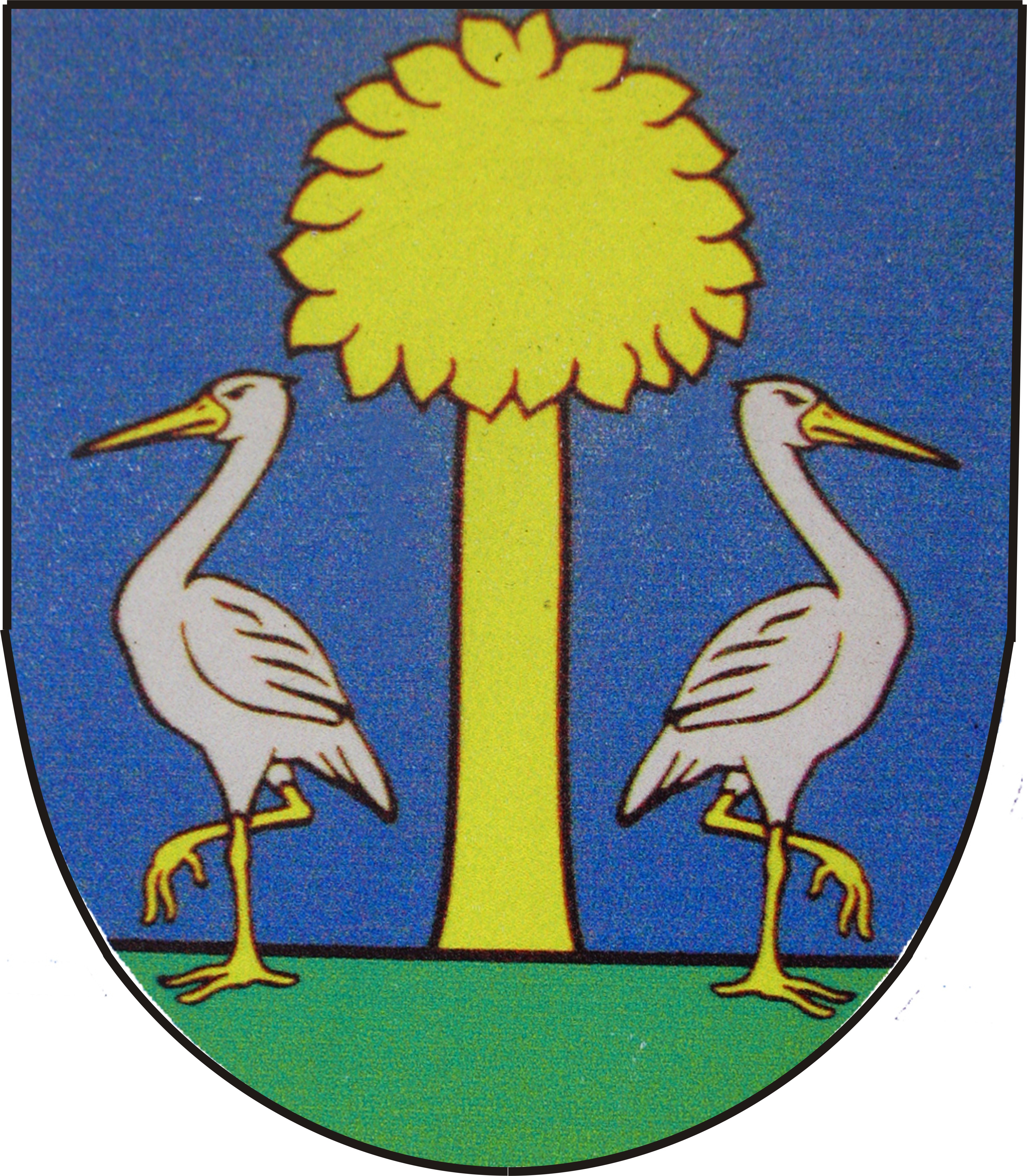
- Flag Coat of arms

- Location of Miroľa in the Prešov Region Location of Miroľa in Slovakia
- Coordinates: 49.32°N 21.73°E
- Country: Slovakia
- Region: Prešov Region
- District: Svidník District
- First mentioned: 1572

Area
  - Total: 6.11 km^{2} (2.36 sq mi)
- Elevation: 382 m (1,253 ft)

Population (2025)
  - Total: 46
- Time zone: UTC+1 (CET)
  - Summer (DST): UTC+2 (CEST)
- Postal code: 900 6
- Area code: +421 54
- Vehicle registration plate (until 2022): SK

Miroľa (Rusyn: Мироля; Hungarian: Mérfalva, until 1899: Mirolya) is a village and municipality in Svidník District in the Prešov Region of north-eastern Slovakia.

== History ==
In historical records the village was first mentioned in 1572.

== Geography ==
The municipality lies at an altitude of 382 metres (1,253 ft) and covers an area of 6.11 km^{2} (2.36 sq mi) (2025).

== Population ==
Population statistic (10 years)
Year	1995	2005	2015	2025
Count	83	69	61	46
Difference		−16.86%	−11.59%	−24.59%

Population statistic
Year	2024	2025
Count	50	46
Difference		−8%

It has a population of 46 people (31 December 2025).

=== Ethnicity ===
Census 2021 (1+ %)
Ethnicity	Number	Fraction
Rusyn	43	76.78%
Slovak	39	69.64%
Not found out	5	8.92%
Total	56	

In year 2021 was 56 people by ethnicity 43 as Rusyn, 39 as Slovak and 5 as Not found out.

Note on population: The difference values of population numbers in the table "Population statistic" and in the sections "Ethnicity" & "Religion" is caused by the use of various statistical methods.

=== Religion ===
Census 2021 (1+ %)
Religion	Number	Fraction
Greek Catholic Church	29	51.79%
Eastern Orthodox Church	23	41.07%
None	2	3.57%
Roman Catholic Church	1	1.79%
Not found out	1	1.79%
Total	56	

In year 2021 was 56 people by religion 29 from Greek Catholic Church, 23 from Eastern Orthodox Church, 2 from None, 1 from Roman Catholic Church and 1 from Not found out.
