= Dukovce =

- Municipality
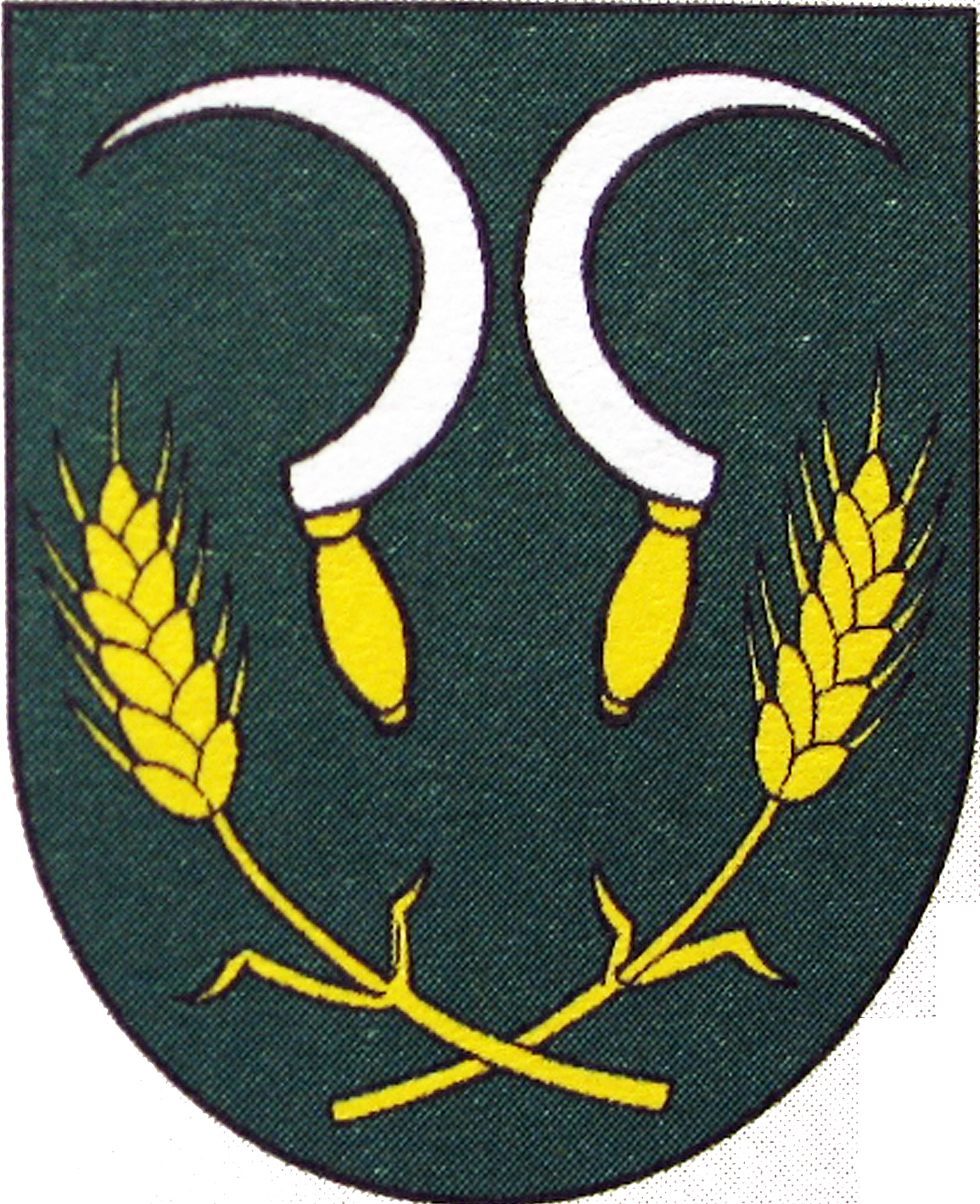
- Flag Coat of arms

- Location of Dukovce in the Prešov Region Location of Dukovce in Slovakia
- Coordinates: 49.12°N 21.42°E
- Country: Slovakia
- Region: Prešov Region
- District: Svidník District
- First mentioned: 1401

Area
  - Total: 5.63 km^{2} (2.17 sq mi)
- Elevation: 253 m (830 ft)

Population (2025)
  - Total: 319
- Time zone: UTC+1 (CET)
  - Summer (DST): UTC+2 (CEST)
- Postal code: 864 4
- Area code: +421 54
- Vehicle registration plate (until 2022): SK
- Website: www.dukovce.sk

Dukovce (Hungarian: Dukafalva) is a village and municipality in Svidník District in the Prešov Region of north-eastern Slovakia.

== History ==
The village was first mentioned in historical records in 1401.

== Geography ==
The municipality lies at an altitude of 253 metres (830 ft) and covers an area of 5.63 km^{2} (2.17 sq mi) (2025).

== Population ==
Population statistic (10 years)
Year	1995	2005	2015	2025
Count	240	248	264	319
Difference		+3.33%	+6.45%	+20.83%

Population statistic
Year	2024	2025
Count	317	319
Difference		+0.63%

It has a population of 319 people (31 December 2025).

=== Ethnicity ===
Census 2021 (1+ %)
Ethnicity	Number	Fraction
Slovak	277	98.92%
Not found out	3	1.07%
Total	280	

In year 2021 was 280 people by ethnicity 277 as Slovak, 3 as Not found out, 2 as Rusyn and 1 as Czech.

Note on population: The difference values of population numbers in the table "Population statistic" and in the sections "Ethnicity" & "Religion" is caused by the use of various statistical methods.

=== Religion ===
Census 2021 (1+ %)
Religion	Number	Fraction
Roman Catholic Church	215	76.79%
Evangelical Church	49	17.5%
None	11	3.93%
Total	280	

In year 2021 was 280 people by religion 215 from Roman Catholic Church, 49 from Evangelical Church, 11 from None, 2 from Not found out, 2 from Greek Catholic Church and 1 from Ad hoc movements.

== Genealogical resources ==
The records for genealogical research are available at the state archive "Statny Archiv in Presov, Slovakia"

- Roman Catholic church records (births/marriages/deaths): 1848-1908 (parish B)
- Greek Catholic church records (births/marriages/deaths): 1862-1933 (parish B)
- Lutheran church records (births/marriages/deaths): 1742-1897 (parish B)

== See also ==
- List of municipalities and towns in Slovakia
