= Vápeník =

- Municipality
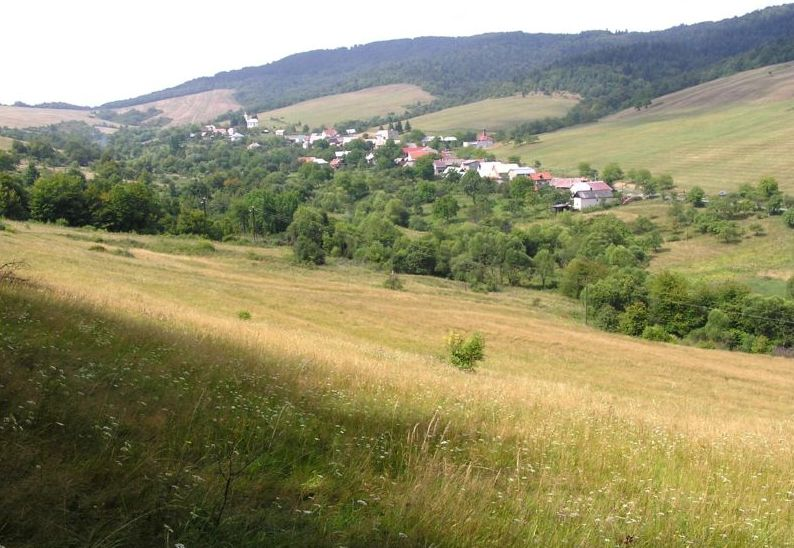

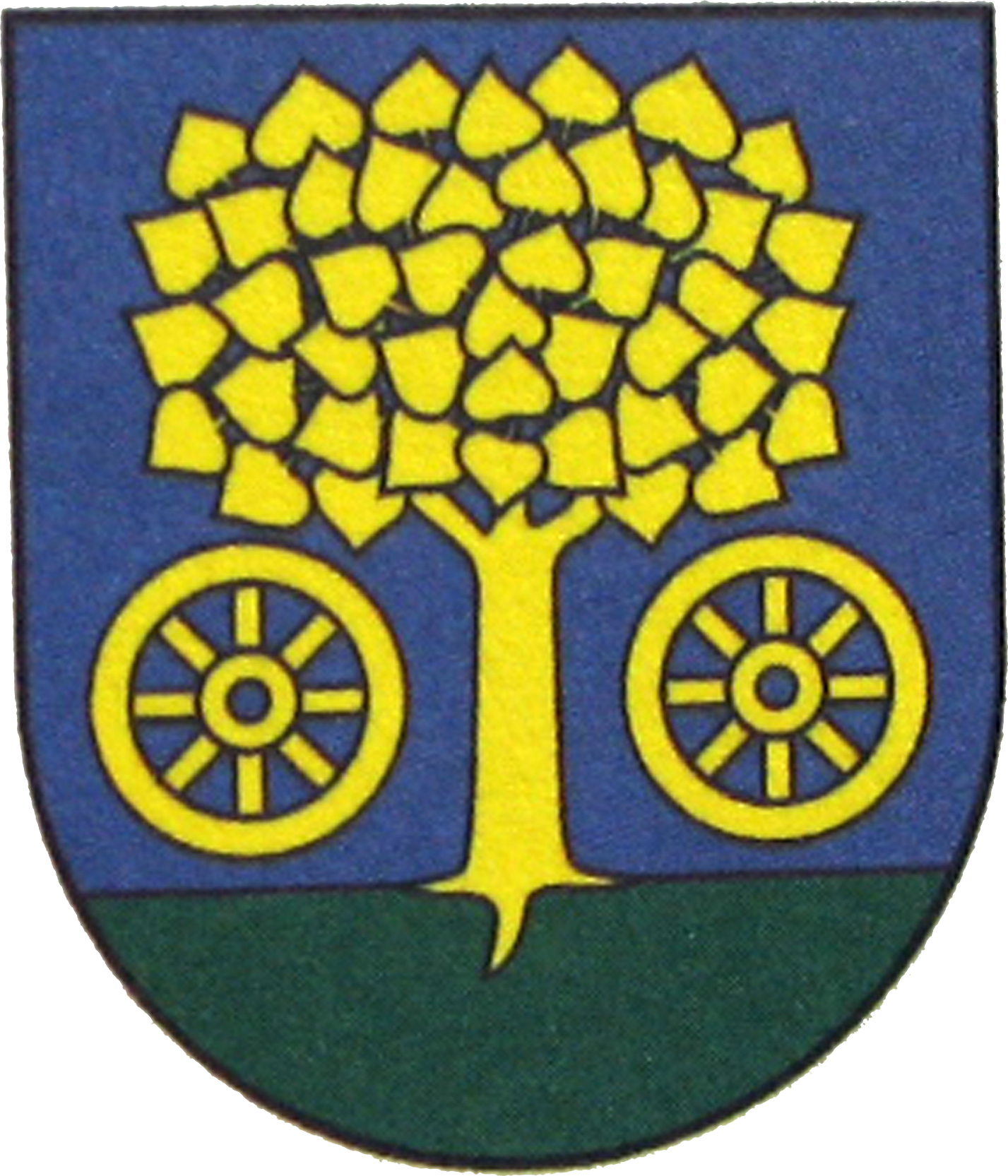
- Flag Coat of arms

- Location of Vápeník in the Prešov Region Location of Vápeník in Slovakia
- Coordinates: 49.40°N 21.53°E
- Country: Slovakia
- Region: Prešov Region
- District: Svidník District
- First mentioned: 1600

Area
  - Total: 3.76 km^{2} (1.45 sq mi)
- Elevation: 402 m (1,319 ft)

Population (2025)
  - Total: 36
- Time zone: UTC+1 (CET)
  - Summer (DST): UTC+2 (CEST)
- Postal code: 900 2
- Area code: +421 54
- Vehicle registration plate (until 2022): SK
- Website: obecvapenik.webnode.sk

Vápeník (Rusyn: Вапеник; Hungarian: Mészégető, until 1899: Vapenik) is a village and municipality in Svidník District in the Prešov Region of north-eastern Slovakia.

== History ==
In historical records the village was first mentioned in 1600.

== Geography ==
The municipality lies at an altitude of 402 metres (1,319 ft) and covers an area of 3.76 km^{2} (1.45 sq mi) (2025).

== Population ==
Population statistic (10 years)
Year	1995	2005	2015	2025
Count	62	46	42	36
Difference		−25.80%	−8.69%	−14.28%

Population statistic
Year	2024	2025
Count	37	36
Difference		−2.70%

It has a population of 36 people (31 December 2025).

=== Ethnicity ===
Census 2021 (1+ %)
Ethnicity	Number	Fraction
Slovak	27	67.5%
Rusyn	20	50%
Ukrainian	3	7.5%
Not found out	2	5%
Total	40	

In year 2021 was 40 people by ethnicity 27 as Slovak, 20 as Rusyn, 3 as Ukrainian and 2 as Not found out.

Note on population: The difference values of population numbers in the table "Population statistic" and in the sections "Ethnicity" & "Religion" is caused by the use of various statistical methods.

=== Religion ===
Census 2021 (1+ %)
Religion	Number	Fraction
Eastern Orthodox Church	21	52.5%
Greek Catholic Church	10	25%
None	5	12.5%
Roman Catholic Church	2	5%
Not found out	2	5%
Total	40	

In year 2021 was 40 people by religion 21 from Eastern Orthodox Church, 10 from Greek Catholic Church, 5 from None, 2 from Roman Catholic Church and 2 from Not found out.
