= Svidník District =

Coordinates: 49°18′22″N 21°34′6″E

- District
- Country: Slovakia
- Region (kraj): Prešov Region
- Seat: Svidník

Area
  - Total: 549.51 km^{2} (212.17 sq mi)

Population (2025)
  - Total: 30,855
- Time zone: UTC+1 (CET)
  - Summer (DST): UTC+2 (CEST)
- Telephone prefix: 054
- Vehicle registration plate (until 2022): SK
- Municipalities: 68

Svidník District (Slovak: okres Svidník) is a district in the Prešov Region of eastern Slovakia.

Until 1918, the district was part of the Hungarian county of Šariš (Sáros).

== Population ==
Population statistic (10 years)
Year	1995	2005	2015	2025
Count	33,143	33,407	32,941	30,855
Difference		+0.79%	−1.39%	−6.33%

Population statistic
Year	2024	2025
Count	31,041	30,855
Difference		−0.59%

It has a population of 30,855 people (31 December 2025).

Historical population
Year	Pop.	±%
1970	26,522	—
1980	29,563	+11.5%
1991	32,127	+8.7%
2001	33,506	+4.3%
2011	33,238	−0.8%
2021	31,611	−4.9%
Source: Statistical Office of the Slovak Republic

=== Ethnicity ===
Census 2021 (1+ %)
Ethnicity	Number	Fraction
Slovak	26,812	67.5%
Rusyn	7823	19.69%
Romani	2694	6.78%
Not found out	1606	4.04%
Total	39,716	

In year 2021 was 39,716 people by ethnicity 26,812 as Slovak, 7823 as Rusyn, 2694 as Romani, 1606 as Not found out, 359 as Ukrainian, 138 as Czech, 67 as Russian, 59 as Other, 41 as Polish, 35 as Hungarian, 13 as Vietnamese, 13 as German, 10 as Italian, 10 as English, 6 as Moravian, 6 as Albanian, 4 as Jewish, 3 as Chinese, 3 as Romanian, 3 as Croatian, 3 as Bulgarian, 2 as Greek, 1 as Irish, 1 as Turkish, 1 as Serbian, 1 as Silesian, 1 as Canadian and 1 as French.

Note on population: The difference values of population numbers in the table "Population statistic" and in the sections "Ethnicity" & "Religion" is caused by the use of various statistical methods.

=== Religion ===
Census 2021 (1+ %)
Religion	Number	Fraction
Greek Catholic Church	10,842	34.3%
Roman Catholic Church	9236	29.22%
Eastern Orthodox Church	5412	17.12%
None	2254	7.13%
Evangelical Church	1937	6.13%
Not found out	1425	4.51%
Total	31,611	

In year 2021 was 31,611 people by religion 10,842 from Greek Catholic Church, 9236 from Roman Catholic Church, 5412 from Eastern Orthodox Church, 2254 from None, 1937 from Evangelical Church, 1425 from Not found out, 200 from Jehovah's Witnesses, 49 from Other, 44 from Ad hoc movements, 43 from Christian Congregations in Slovakia, 38 from Paganism and natural spirituality, 37 from Church of the Brethren, 22 from Other and not ascertained christian church, 18 from Calvinist Church, 17 from Apostolic Church, 13 from Buddhism, 7 from United Methodist Church, 6 from Islam, 4 from Jewish community, 3 from Old Catholic Church, 1 from Hinduism, 1 from Czechoslovak Hussite Church, 1 from Church of Jesus Christ of Latter-day Saints and 1 from Baptists Church.

== Municipalities ==
Municipality	Area [km^{2}]	Population
Belejovce	3.08	29
Beňadikovce	12.56	187
Bodružal	7.23	57
Cernina	13.12	575
Cigla	4.87	81
Dlhoňa	8.84	90
Dobroslava	5.57	49
Dubová	12.54	193
Dukovce	5.63	319
Fijaš	4.40	138
Giraltovce	11.04	3,920
Havranec	7.65	16
Hrabovčík	7.10	321
Hunkovce	6.96	311
Jurkova Voľa	7.41	76
Kalnište	8.66	498
Kapišová	6.61	456
Kečkovce	12.81	262
Kobylnice	10.42	87
Korejovce	4.06	67
Kračúnovce	8.25	1,272
Krajná Bystrá	8.94	501
Krajná Poľana	2.94	229
Krajná Porúbka	3.72	33
Krajné Čierno	6.57	77
Kružlová	8.28	762
Kuková	10.60	760
Kurimka	12.45	371
Ladomirová	15.39	1,065
Lúčka	3.54	502
Lužany pri Topli	3.23	246
Matovce	4.01	124
Medvedie	5.06	43
Mestisko	11.05	435
Mičakovce	4.70	115
Miroľa	6.11	46
Mlynárovce	11.22	221
Nižná Jedľová	4.74	100
Nižná Pisaná	7.38	75
Nižný Komárnik	12.38	183
Nižný Mirošov	6.99	263
Nižný Orlík	9.39	333
Nová Polianka	5.47	74
Okrúhle	14.96	556
Príkra	9.32	11
Pstriná	6.22	64
Radoma	10.91	416
Rakovčík	4.66	140
Rovné	13.02	458
Roztoky	11.27	458
Soboš	7.16	144
Stročín	8.65	568
Svidnička	5.72	128
Svidník	19.92	9,500
Šarbov	8.43	19
Šarišský Štiavnik	5.27	244
Šemetkovce	7.07	91
Štefurov	8.75	95
Vagrinec	5.52	119
Valkovce	6.66	207
Vápeník	3.76	36
Vyšná Jedľová	5.08	184
Vyšná Pisaná	9.49	72
Vyšný Komárnik	6.60	67
Vyšný Mirošov	12.69	562
Vyšný Orlík	14.71	380
Železník	5.96	457
Želmanovce	4.70	317

Population and area values are current for year 2025.

== Notable people ==
- Fedor Vico (born 1944), Slovak caricaturist born in Šapinec (Okrúhle)
