= Beňadikovce =

- Municipality
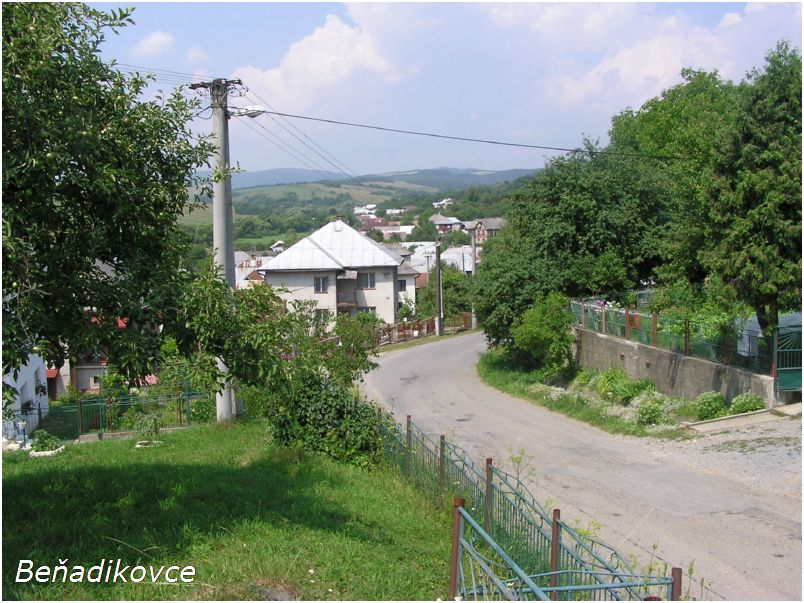

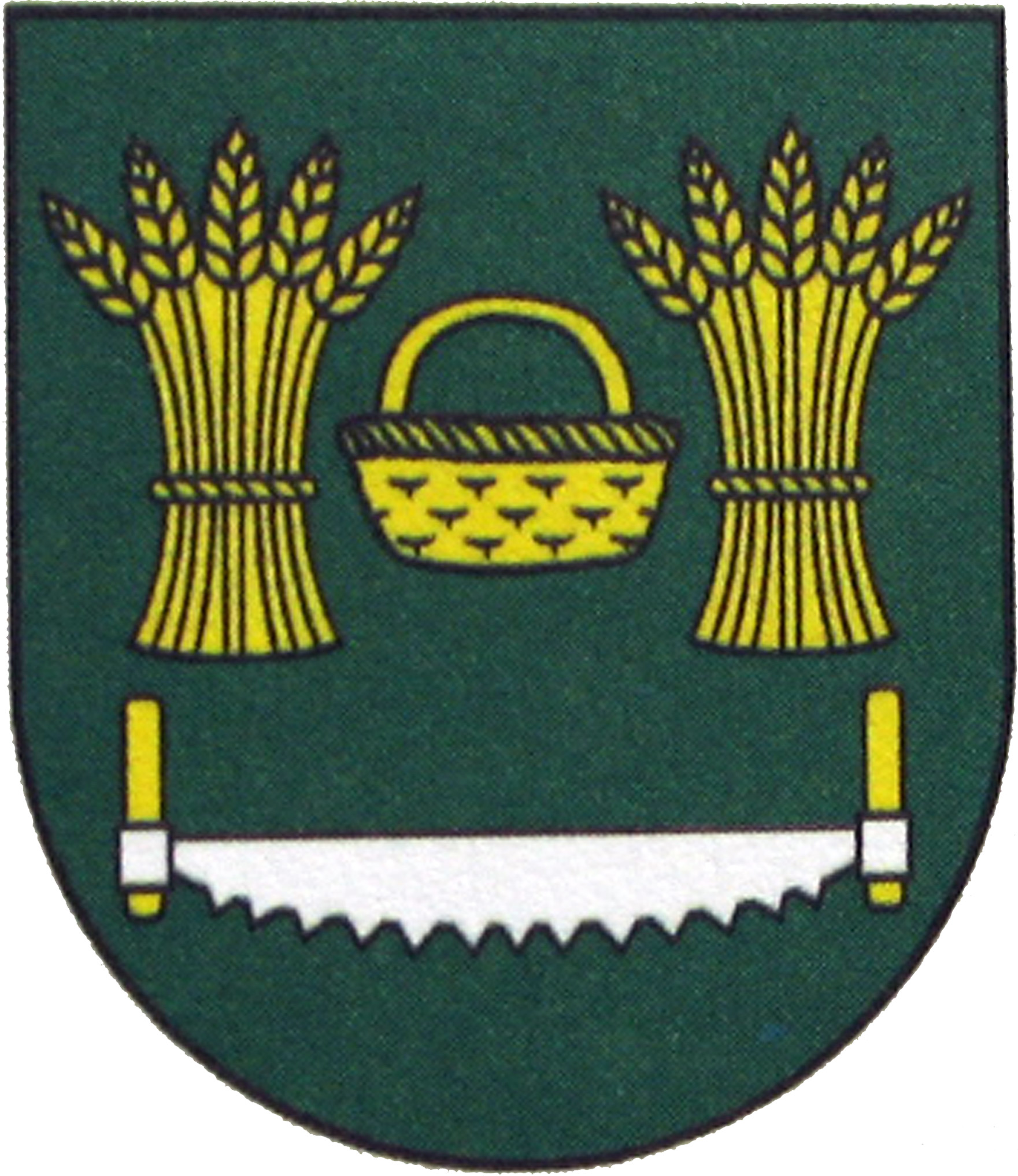
- Flag Coat of arms

- Location of Beňadikovce in the Prešov Region Location of Beňadikovce in Slovakia
- Coordinates: 49.23°N 21.55°E
- Country: Slovakia
- Region: Prešov Region
- District: Svidník District
- First mentioned: 1414

Area
  - Total: 12.56 km^{2} (4.85 sq mi)
- Elevation: 238 m (781 ft)

Population (2025)
  - Total: 187
- Time zone: UTC+1 (CET)
  - Summer (DST): UTC+2 (CEST)
- Postal code: 904 2
- Area code: +421 54
- Vehicle registration plate (until 2022): SK
- Website: www.benadikovce.sk

Beňadikovce (Rusyn: Бенядиківцї; Hungarian: Benedekvágása, until 1899: Benedikócz) is a village and municipality in Svidník District in the Prešov Region of north-eastern Slovakia.

== History ==
In historical records the village was first mentioned in 1402.

== Geography ==
The municipality lies at an altitude of 238 metres (781 ft) and covers an area of 12.56 km^{2} (4.85 sq mi) (2025).

== Population ==
Population statistic (10 years)
Year	1995	2005	2015	2025
Count	244	244	213	187
Difference		+0%	−12.70%	−12.20%

Population statistic
Year	2024	2025
Count	187	187
Difference		+0%

It has a population of 187 people (31 December 2025).

=== Ethnicity ===
Census 2021 (1+ %)
Ethnicity	Number	Fraction
Rusyn	126	61.76%
Slovak	108	52.94%
Romani	16	7.84%
Not found out	3	1.47%
Total	204	

In year 2021 was 204 people by ethnicity 126 as Rusyn, 108 as Slovak, 16 as Romani, 3 as Not found out, 2 as Czech, 2 as Russian, 2 as German, 1 as Polish, 1 as Hungarian and 1 as Other.

Note on population: The difference values of population numbers in the table "Population statistic" and in the sections "Ethnicity" & "Religion" is caused by the use of various statistical methods.

=== Religion ===
Census 2021 (1+ %)
Religion	Number	Fraction
Greek Catholic Church	156	76.47%
Roman Catholic Church	22	10.78%
None	14	6.86%
Jehovah's Witnesses	5	2.45%
Eastern Orthodox Church	4	1.96%
Total	204	

In year 2021 was 204 people by religion 156 from Greek Catholic Church, 22 from Roman Catholic Church, 14 from None, 5 from Jehovah's Witnesses, 4 from Eastern Orthodox Church, 2 from Evangelical Church and 1 from United Methodist Church.

== Genealogical resources ==
The records for genealogical research are available at the state archive "Statny Archiv in Presov, Slovakia"

- Roman Catholic church records (births/marriages/deaths): 1775–1895 (parish B)

== See also ==
- List of municipalities and towns in Slovakia
