= Cigla =

- Municipality
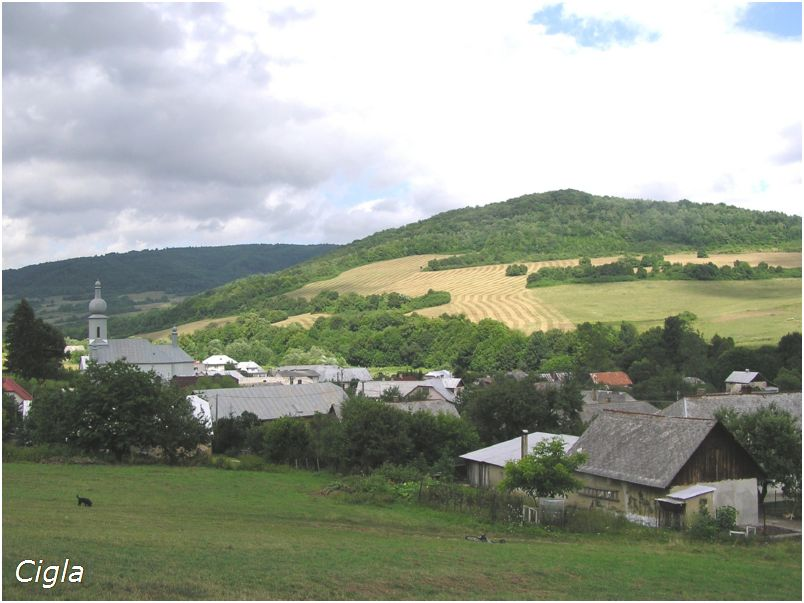

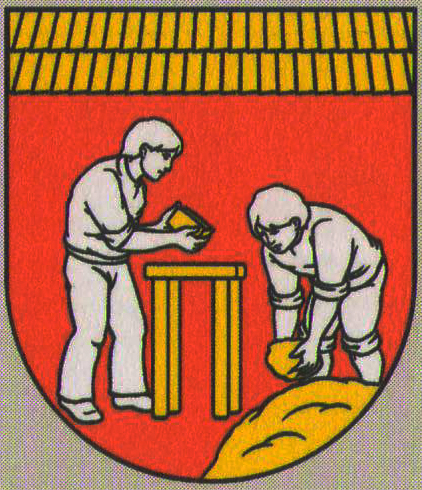
- Flag Coat of arms

- Location of Cigla in the Prešov Region Location of Cigla in Slovakia
- Coordinates: 49.37°N 21.40°E
- Country: Slovakia
- Region: Prešov Region
- District: Svidník District
- First mentioned: 1427

Area
  - Total: 4.87 km^{2} (1.88 sq mi)
- Elevation: 329 m (1,079 ft)

Population (2025)
  - Total: 81
- Time zone: UTC+1 (CET)
  - Summer (DST): UTC+2 (CEST)
- Postal code: 901 4
- Area code: +421 54
- Vehicle registration plate (until 2022): SK
- Website: cigla.sk

Cigla (Rusyn: Ціґла) is a village and municipality in Svidník District in the Prešov Region of north-eastern Slovakia.

== History ==
In historical records the village was first mentioned in 1427.

== Geography ==
The municipality lies at an altitude of 329 metres (1,079 ft) and covers an area of 4.87 km^{2} (1.88 sq mi) (2025).

== Population ==
Population statistic (10 years)
Year	1995	2005	2015	2025
Count	82	89	92	81
Difference		+8.53%	+3.37%	−11.95%

Population statistic
Year	2024	2025
Count	79	81
Difference		+2.53%

It has a population of 81 people (31 December 2025).

=== Ethnicity ===
Census 2021 (1+ %)
Ethnicity	Number	Fraction
Slovak	56	75.67%
Rusyn	25	33.78%
Ukrainian	3	4.05%
Romanian	1	1.35%
Not found out	1	1.35%
Total	74	

In year 2021 was 74 people by ethnicity 56 as Slovak, 25 as Rusyn, 3 as Ukrainian, 1 as Romanian and 1 as Not found out.

Note on population: The difference values of population numbers in the table "Population statistic" and in the sections "Ethnicity" & "Religion" is caused by the use of various statistical methods.

=== Religion ===
Census 2021 (1+ %)
Religion	Number	Fraction
Greek Catholic Church	57	77.03%
Eastern Orthodox Church	6	8.11%
Roman Catholic Church	5	6.76%
None	3	4.05%
Not found out	1	1.35%
Evangelical Church	1	1.35%
Ad hoc movements	1	1.35%
Total	74	

In year 2021 was 74 people by religion 57 from Greek Catholic Church, 6 from Eastern Orthodox Church, 5 from Roman Catholic Church, 3 from None, 1 from Not found out, 1 from Evangelical Church and 1 from Ad hoc movements.

== Genealogical resources ==
The records for genealogical research are available at the state archive "Statny Archiv in Presov, Slovakia"

- Roman Catholic church records (births/marriages/deaths): 1695-1895 (parish B)

== See also ==
- List of municipalities and towns in Slovakia
