= Vyšná Jedľová =

- Municipality
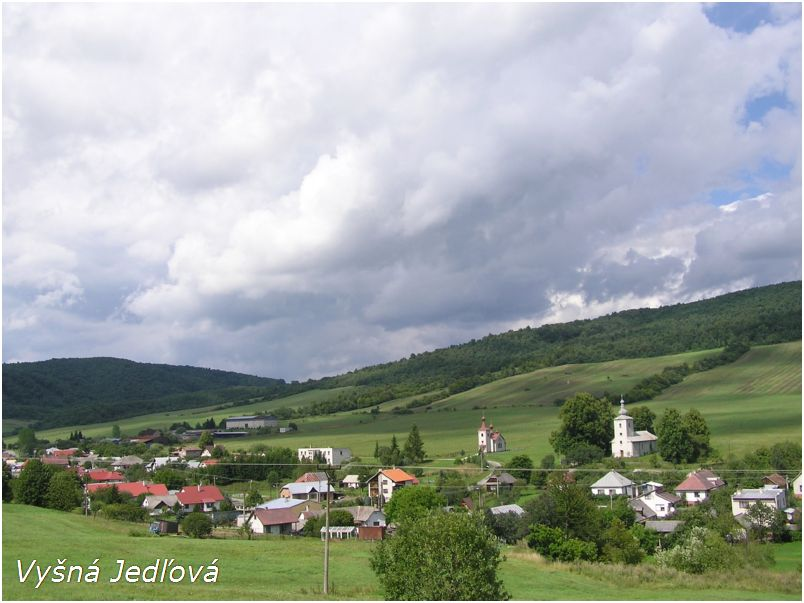

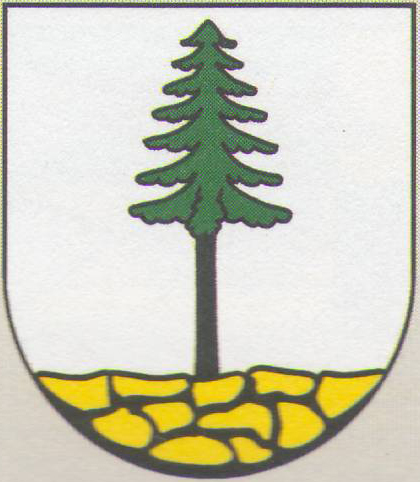
- Flag Coat of arms

- Location of Vyšná Jedľová in the Prešov Region Location of Vyšná Jedľová in Slovakia
- Coordinates: 49.35°N 21.53°E
- Country: Slovakia
- Region: Prešov Region
- District: Svidník District
- First mentioned: 1572

Area
  - Total: 5.08 km^{2} (1.96 sq mi)
- Elevation: 312 m (1,024 ft)

Population (2025)
  - Total: 184
- Time zone: UTC+1 (CET)
  - Summer (DST): UTC+2 (CEST)
- Postal code: 890 1
- Area code: +421 54
- Vehicle registration plate (until 2022): SK
- Website: vysna-jedlova.sk

Vyšná Jedľová (Hungarian: Felsőfenyves, until 1899: Felső-Jedlova) is a village and municipality in Svidník District in the Prešov Region of north-eastern Slovakia.

== History ==
In historical records the village was first mentioned in 1572.

== Geography ==
The municipality lies at an altitude of 312 metres (1,024 ft) and covers an area of 5.08 km^{2} (1.96 sq mi) (2025).

== Population ==
Population statistic (10 years)
| Year | 1995 | 2005 | 2015 | 2025 |
|---|---|---|---|---|
| Count | 186 | 207 | 189 | 184 |
| Difference | | +11.29% | −8.69% | −2.64% |

Population statistic
| Year | 2024 | 2025 |
|---|---|---|
| Count | 185 | 184 |
| Difference | | −0.54% |

It has a population of 184 people (31 December 2025).

=== Ethnicity ===
Census 2021 (1+ %)
| Ethnicity | Number | Fraction |
|---|---|---|
| Slovak | 131 | 69.31% |
| Rusyn | 101 | 53.43% |
| Romani | 21 | 11.11% |
| Not found out | 10 | 5.29% |
| Ukrainian | 3 | 1.58% |
| Total | 189 | |

In year 2021 was 189 people by ethnicity 131 as Slovak, 101 as Rusyn, 21 as Romani, 10 as Not found out and 3 as Ukrainian.

Note on population: The difference values of population numbers in the table "Population statistic" and in the sections "Ethnicity" & "Religion" is caused by the use of various statistical methods.

=== Religion ===
Census 2021 (1+ %)
| Religion | Number | Fraction |
|---|---|---|
| Eastern Orthodox Church | 125 | 66.14% |
| Greek Catholic Church | 34 | 17.99% |
| Roman Catholic Church | 10 | 5.29% |
| Not found out | 7 | 3.7% |
| None | 7 | 3.7% |
| Jehovah's Witnesses | 4 | 2.12% |
| Evangelical Church | 2 | 1.06% |
| Total | 189 | |

In year 2021 was 189 people by religion 125 from Eastern Orthodox Church, 34 from Greek Catholic Church, 10 from Roman Catholic Church, 7 from Not found out, 7 from None, 4 from Jehovah's Witnesses and 2 from Evangelical Church.
