= Kružlová =

- Municipality
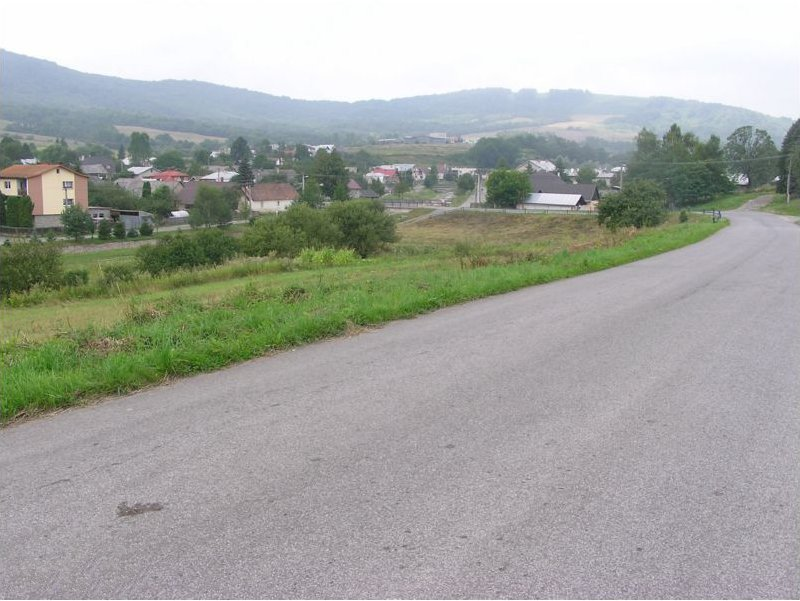

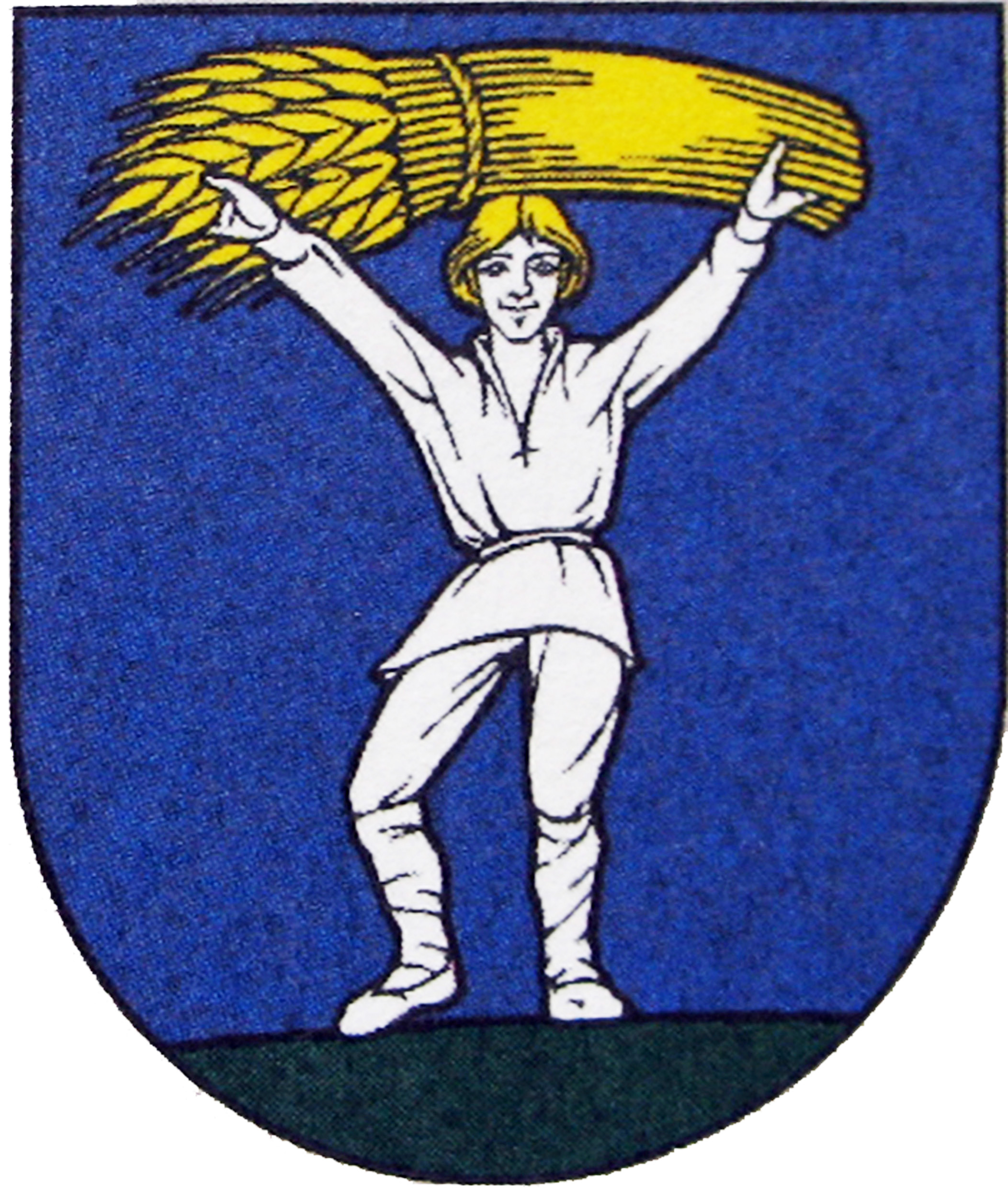
- Flag Coat of arms

- Location of Kružlová in the Prešov Region Location of Kružlová in Slovakia
- Coordinates: 49.35°N 21.58°E
- Country: Slovakia
- Region: Prešov Region
- District: Svidník District
- First mentioned: 1414

Area
  - Total: 8.28 km^{2} (3.20 sq mi)
- Elevation: 282 m (925 ft)

Population (2025)
  - Total: 762
- Time zone: UTC+1 (CET)
  - Summer (DST): UTC+2 (CEST)
- Postal code: 900 2
- Area code: +421 54
- Vehicle registration plate (until 2022): SK
- Website: kruzlova.sk/new/

Kružlová (Hungarian: Ruzsoly, until 1899: Kruzslyova; Rusyn: Кружльова) is a village and municipality in Svidník District in the Prešov Region of north-eastern Slovakia.

== History ==
In historical records the village was first mentioned in 1414.

== Geography ==
The municipality lies at an altitude of 282 metres (925 ft) and covers an area of 8.28 km^{2} (3.20 sq mi) (2025).

== Population ==
Population statistic (10 years)
Year	1995	2005	2015	2025
Count	523	568	683	762
Difference		+8.60%	+20.24%	+11.56%

Population statistic
Year	2024	2025
Count	753	762
Difference		+1.19%

It has a population of 762 people (31 December 2025).

=== Ethnicity ===
Census 2021 (1+ %)
Ethnicity	Number	Fraction
Slovak	495	70.21%
Rusyn	207	29.36%
Romani	170	24.11%
Not found out	16	2.26%
Total	705	

In year 2021 was 705 people by ethnicity 495 as Slovak, 207 as Rusyn, 170 as Romani, 16 as Not found out, 2 as Czech, 1 as Ukrainian and 1 as Other.

Note on population: The difference values of population numbers in the table "Population statistic" and in the sections "Ethnicity" & "Religion" is caused by the use of various statistical methods.

=== Religion ===
Census 2021 (1+ %)
Religion	Number	Fraction
Eastern Orthodox Church	483	68.51%
None	111	15.74%
Greek Catholic Church	41	5.82%
Roman Catholic Church	36	5.11%
Jehovah's Witnesses	13	1.84%
Not found out	11	1.56%
Total	705	

In year 2021 was 705 people by religion 483 from Eastern Orthodox Church, 111 from None, 41 from Greek Catholic Church, 36 from Roman Catholic Church, 13 from Jehovah's Witnesses, 11 from Not found out, 6 from Calvinist Church and 4 from Evangelical Church.
