= Šarbov =

- Municipality
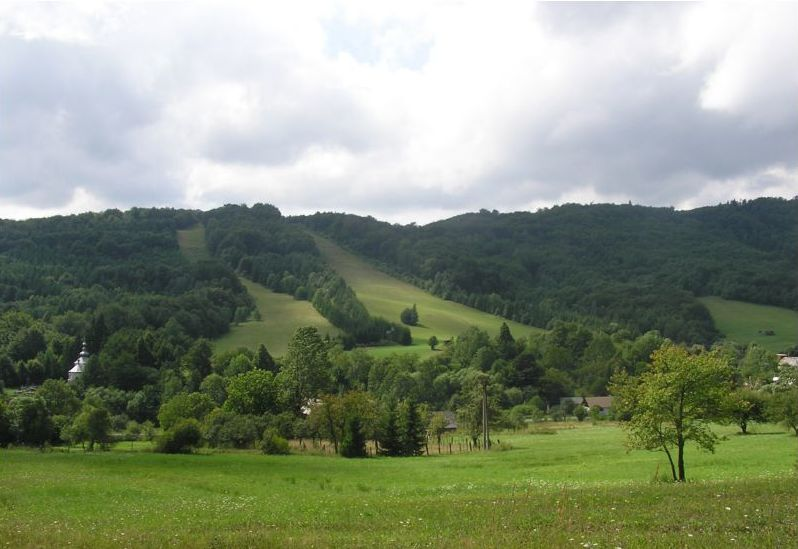

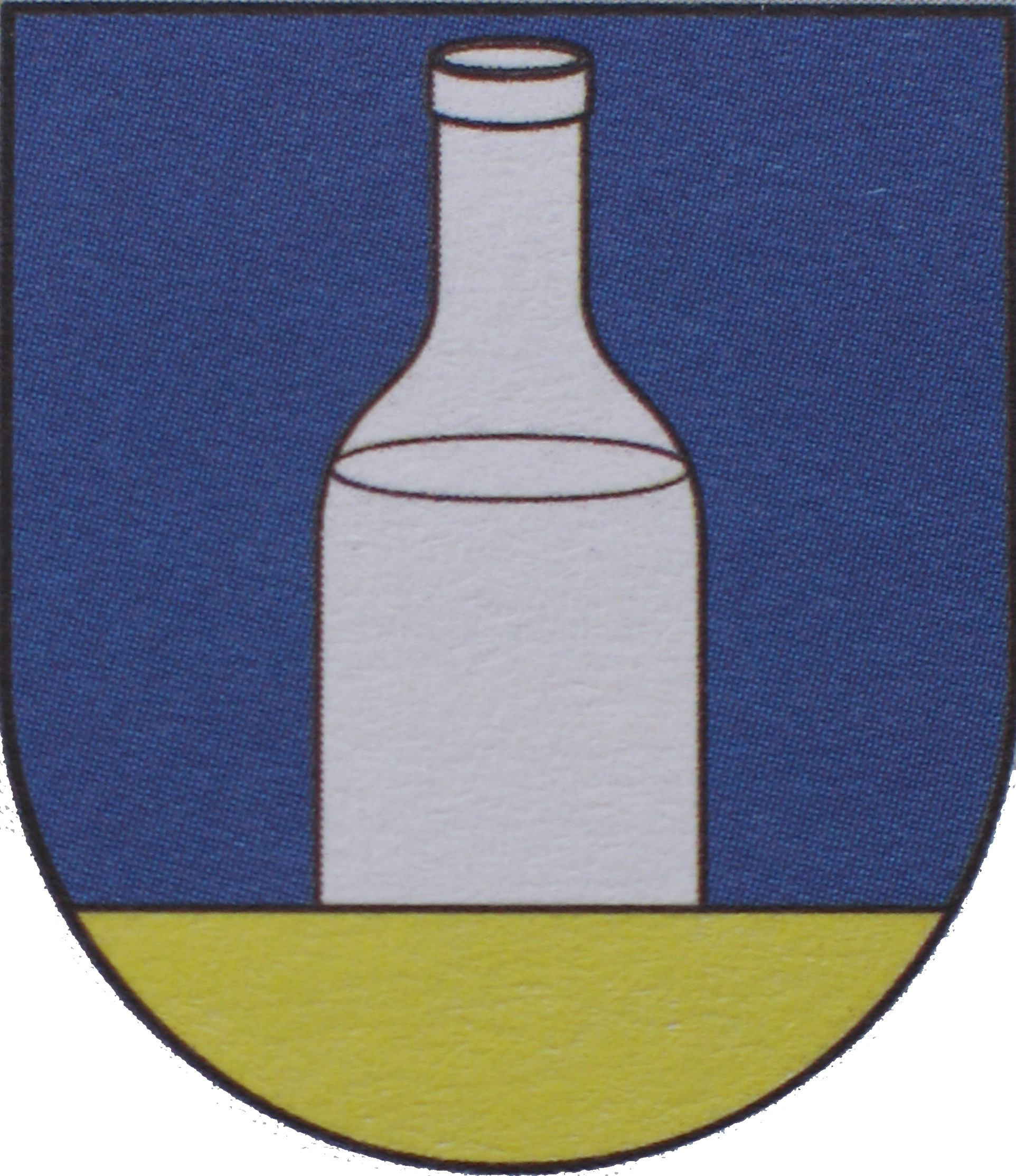
- Flag Coat of arms

- Location of Šarbov in the Prešov Region Location of Šarbov in Slovakia
- Coordinates: 49.38°N 21.63°E
- Country: Slovakia
- Region: Prešov Region
- District: Svidník District
- First mentioned: 1618

Area
  - Total: 8.43 km^{2} (3.25 sq mi)
- Elevation: 446 m (1,463 ft)

Population (2025)
  - Total: 19
- Time zone: UTC+1 (CET)
  - Summer (DST): UTC+2 (CEST)
- Postal code: 900 4
- Area code: +421 54
- Vehicle registration plate (until 2022): SK
- Website: sarbov0.webnode.sk

Šarbov (Hungarian: Sarbó) is a village and municipality in Svidník District in the Prešov Region of north-eastern Slovakia.

== History ==
In historical records the village was first mentioned in 1618.

== Geography ==
The municipality lies at an altitude of 446 metres (1,463 ft) and covers an area of 8.43 km^{2} (3.25 sq mi) (2025).

== Population ==
Population statistic (10 years)
| Year | 1995 | 2005 | 2015 | 2025 |
|---|---|---|---|---|
| Count | 17 | 11 | 11 | 19 |
| Difference | | −35.29% | +0% | +72.72% |

Population statistic
| Year | 2024 | 2025 |
|---|---|---|
| Count | 19 | 19 |
| Difference | | +0% |

It has a population of 19 people (31 December 2025).

=== Ethnicity ===
Census 2021 (1+ %)
| Ethnicity | Number | Fraction |
|---|---|---|
| Slovak | 15 | 88.23% |
| Rusyn | 8 | 47.05% |
| Not found out | 1 | 5.88% |
| Total | 17 | |

In year 2021 was 17 people by ethnicity 15 as Slovak, 8 as Rusyn and 1 as Not found out.

Note on population: The difference values of population numbers in the table "Population statistic" and in the sections "Ethnicity" & "Religion" is caused by the use of various statistical methods.

=== Religion ===
Census 2021 (1+ %)
| Religion | Number | Fraction |
|---|---|---|
| Greek Catholic Church | 15 | 88.24% |
| Roman Catholic Church | 1 | 5.88% |
| None | 1 | 5.88% |
| Total | 17 | |

In year 2021 was 17 people by religion 15 from Greek Catholic Church, 1 from Roman Catholic Church and 1 from None.
