= Belejovce =

- Municipality
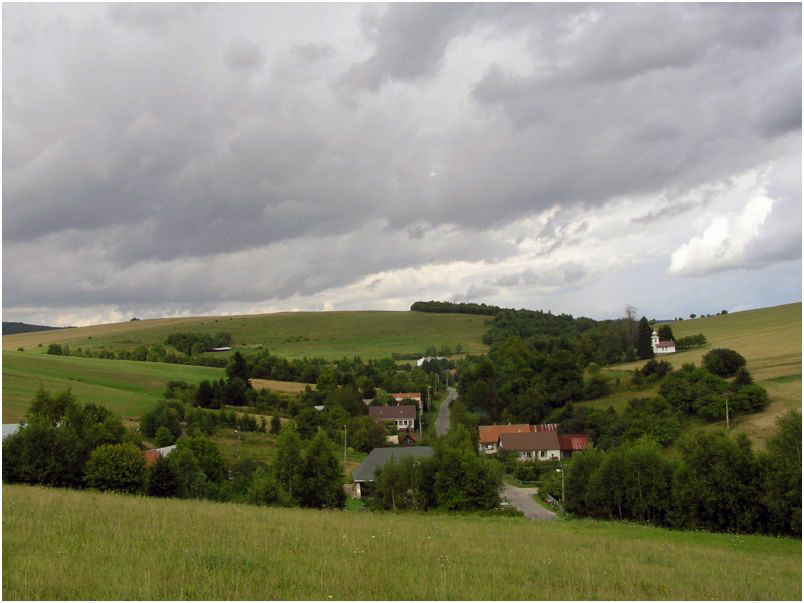

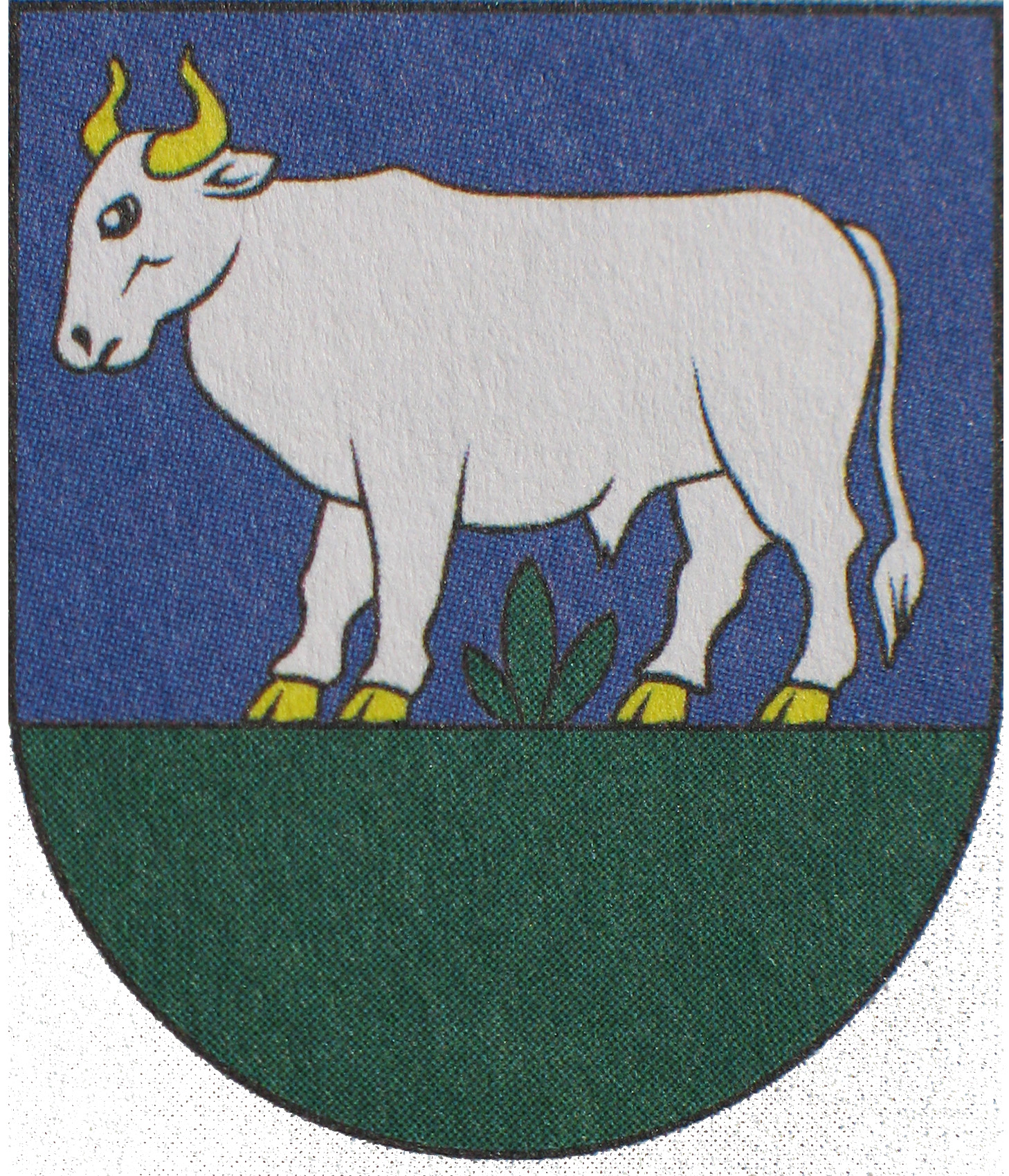
- Flag Coat of arms

- Location of Belejovce in the Prešov Region Location of Belejovce in Slovakia
- Coordinates: 49.38°N 21.55°E
- Country: Slovakia
- Region: Prešov Region
- District: Svidník District
- First mentioned: 1600

Area
  - Total: 3.08 km^{2} (1.19 sq mi)
- Elevation: 454 m (1,490 ft)

Population (2025)
  - Total: 29
- Time zone: UTC+1 (CET)
  - Summer (DST): UTC+2 (CEST)
- Postal code: 890 1
- Area code: +421 54
- Vehicle registration plate (until 2022): SK

Belejovce (Rusyn: Белеївцї; Hungarian: Belejőc) is a village and municipality in Svidník District in the Prešov Region of north-eastern Slovakia.

== History ==
In historical records the village was first mentioned in 1600.

== Geography ==
The municipality lies at an altitude of 454 metres (1,490 ft) and covers an area of 3.08 km^{2} (1.19 sq mi) (2025).

== Population ==
Population statistic (10 years)
| Year | 1995 | 2005 | 2015 | 2025 |
|---|---|---|---|---|
| Count | 15 | 20 | 19 | 29 |
| Difference | | +33.33% | −5% | +52.63% |

Population statistic
| Year | 2024 | 2025 |
|---|---|---|
| Count | 28 | 29 |
| Difference | | +3.57% |

It has a population of 29 people (31 December 2025).

=== Ethnicity ===
Census 2021 (1+ %)
| Ethnicity | Number | Fraction |
|---|---|---|
| Slovak | 23 | 95.83% |
| Rusyn | 8 | 33.33% |
| Other | 1 | 4.16% |
| Total | 24 | |

In year 2021 was 24 people by ethnicity 23 as Slovak, 8 as Rusyn and 1 as Other.

Note on population: The difference values of population numbers in the table "Population statistic" and in the sections "Ethnicity" & "Religion" is caused by the use of various statistical methods.

=== Religion ===
Census 2021 (1+ %)
| Religion | Number | Fraction |
|---|---|---|
| Greek Catholic Church | 9 | 37.5% |
| Roman Catholic Church | 6 | 25% |
| Eastern Orthodox Church | 6 | 25% |
| None | 3 | 12.5% |
| Total | 24 | |

In year 2021 was 24 people by religion 9 from Greek Catholic Church, 6 from Roman Catholic Church, 6 from Eastern Orthodox Church and 3 from None.

== Genealogical resources ==
The records for genealogical research are available at the state archive "Statny Archiv in Presov, Slovakia"

- Greek Catholic church records (births/marriages/deaths): 1862-1895 (parish B)

== See also ==
- List of municipalities and towns in Slovakia
