= Kečkovce =

- Municipality
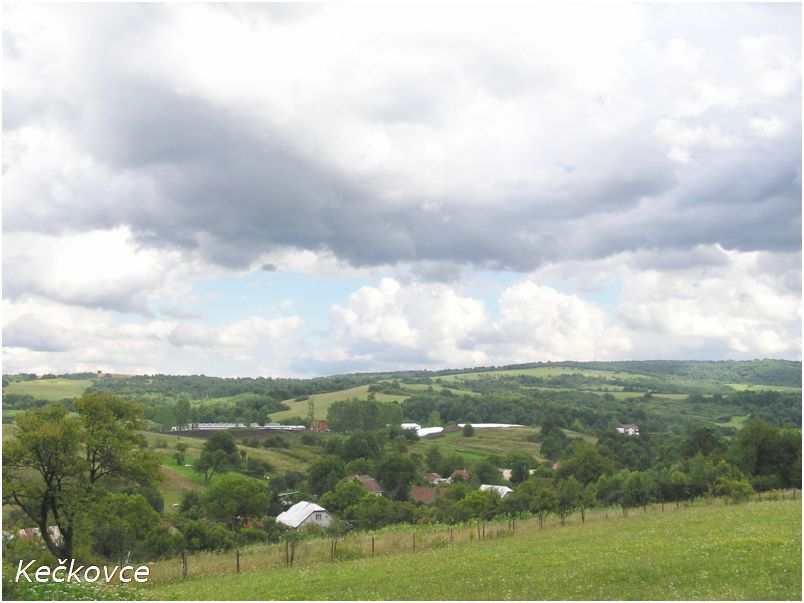

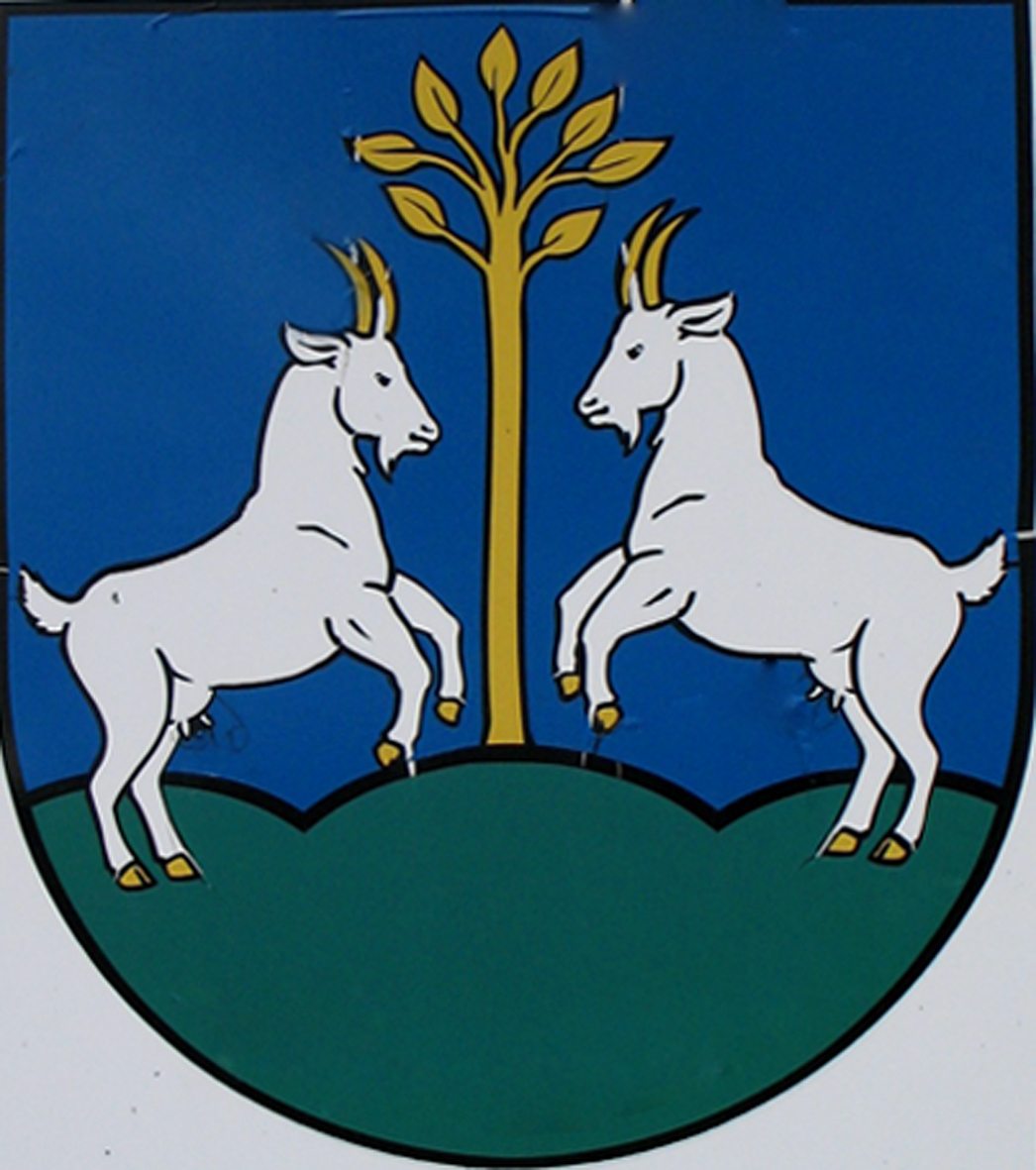
- Flag Coat of arms

- Location of Kečkovce in the Prešov Region Location of Kečkovce in Slovakia
- Coordinates: 49.38°N 21.52°E
- Country: Slovakia
- Region: Prešov Region
- District: Svidník District
- First mentioned: 1582

Area
  - Total: 12.81 km^{2} (4.95 sq mi)
- Elevation: 383 m (1,257 ft)

Population (2025)
  - Total: 262
- Time zone: UTC+1 (CET)
  - Summer (DST): UTC+2 (CEST)
- Postal code: 901 1
- Area code: +421 54
- Vehicle registration plate (until 2022): SK

Kečkovce (Rusyn: Кечківцї; Hungarian: Kecskőc) is a village and municipality in Svidník District in the Prešov Region of north-eastern Slovakia.

== History ==
In historical records the village was first mentioned in 1582.

== Geography ==
The municipality lies at an altitude of 383 metres (1,257 ft) and covers an area of 12.81 km^{2} (4.95 sq mi) (2025).

== Population ==
Population statistic (10 years)
Year	1995	2005	2015	2025
Count	225	226	252	262
Difference		+0.44%	+11.50%	+3.96%

Population statistic
Year	2024	2025
Count	264	262
Difference		−0.75%

It has a population of 262 people (31 December 2025).

=== Ethnicity ===
Census 2021 (1+ %)
Ethnicity	Number	Fraction
Slovak	209	82.28%
Rusyn	53	20.86%
Romani	42	16.53%
Not found out	21	8.26%
Czech	3	1.18%
Total	254	

In year 2021 was 254 people by ethnicity 209 as Slovak, 53 as Rusyn, 42 as Romani, 21 as Not found out, 3 as Czech, 1 as Ukrainian and 1 as Albanian.

Note on population: The difference values of population numbers in the table "Population statistic" and in the sections "Ethnicity" & "Religion" is caused by the use of various statistical methods.

=== Religion ===
Census 2021 (1+ %)
Religion	Number	Fraction
Eastern Orthodox Church	105	41.34%
Greek Catholic Church	65	25.59%
None	44	17.32%
Not found out	17	6.69%
Roman Catholic Church	13	5.12%
Jehovah's Witnesses	9	3.54%
Total	254	

In year 2021 was 254 people by religion 105 from Eastern Orthodox Church, 65 from Greek Catholic Church, 44 from None, 17 from Not found out, 13 from Roman Catholic Church, 9 from Jehovah's Witnesses and 1 from Ad hoc movements.

== Genealogical resources ==
The records for genealogical research are available at the state archive "Statny Archiv in Presov, Slovakia"

- Greek Catholic church records (births/marriages/deaths): 1881-1895 (parish A)

== See also ==
- List of municipalities and towns in Slovakia
