= Jurkova Voľa =

Municipality in Prešov, Slovakia

- Municipality
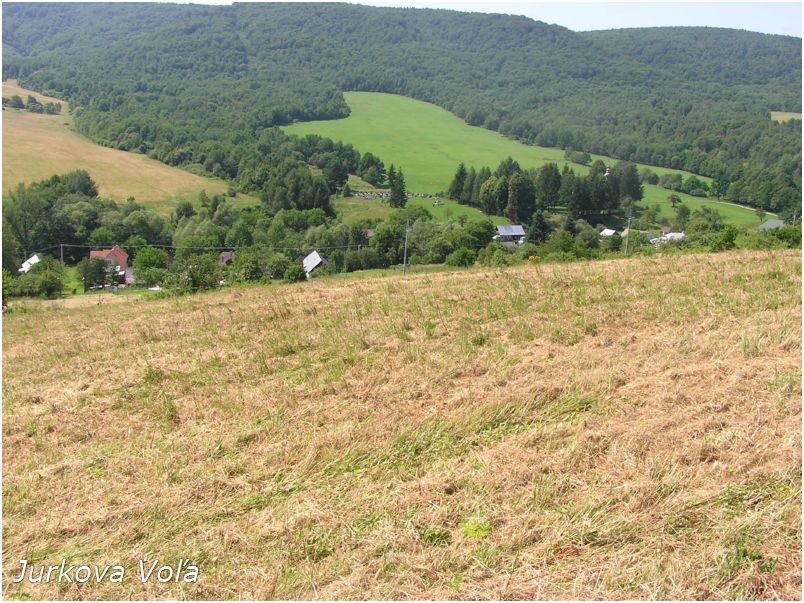

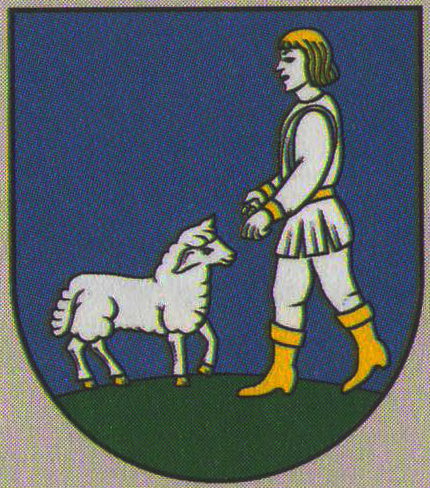
- Flag Coat of arms

- Location of Jurkova Voľa in the Prešov Region Location of Jurkova Voľa in Slovakia
- Coordinates: 49.32°N 21.52°E
- Country: Slovakia
- Region: Prešov Region
- District: Svidník District
- First mentioned: 1600

Area
  - Total: 7.41 km^{2} (2.86 sq mi)
- Elevation: 295 m (968 ft)

Population (2025)
  - Total: 76
- Time zone: UTC+1 (CET)
  - Summer (DST): UTC+2 (CEST)
- Postal code: 890 1
- Area code: +421 54
- Vehicle registration plate (until 2022): SK
- Website: jurkovavola.webnode.sk

Jurkova Voľa (Rusyn: Юркова Воля; Hungarian: Györgyfölde, until 1899: Jurko-Volya) is a village and municipality in the Svidník District in the Prešov Region of north-eastern Slovakia.

== History ==
Historical records of the village were first mentioned in 1600.

== Geography ==
The municipality lies at an altitude of 295 metres (968 ft) and covers an area of 7.41 km^{2} (2.86 sq mi) (2025).

== Population ==
Population statistic (10 years)
Year	1995	2005	2015	2025
Count	85	74	82	76
Difference		−12.94%	+10.81%	−7.31%

Population statistic
Year	2024	2025
Count	77	76
Difference		−1.29%

It has a population of 76 people (31 December 2025).

=== Ethnicity ===
Census 2021 (1+ %)
Ethnicity	Number	Fraction
Slovak	63	75%
Rusyn	43	51.19%
Ukrainian	3	3.57%
Not found out	3	3.57%
Czech	1	1.19%
Irish	1	1.19%
Total	84	

In year 2021 was 84 people by ethnicity 63 as Slovak, 43 as Rusyn, 3 as Ukrainian, 3 as Not found out, 1 as Czech and 1 as Irish.

Note on population: The difference values of population numbers in the table "Population statistic" and in the sections "Ethnicity" & "Religion" is caused by the use of various statistical methods.

=== Religion ===
Census 2021 (1+ %)
Religion	Number	Fraction
Greek Catholic Church	58	69.05%
None	13	15.48%
Eastern Orthodox Church	6	7.14%
Roman Catholic Church	4	4.76%
Not found out	3	3.57%
Total	84	

In year 2021 was 84 people by religion 58 from Greek Catholic Church, 13 from None, 6 from Eastern Orthodox Church, 4 from Roman Catholic Church and 3 from Not found out.

== Genealogical resources ==
The records for genealogical research are available at the state archive "Statny Archiv in Presov, Slovakia".

- Greek Catholic church records (births/marriages/deaths): 1835-1900 (parish B)

== See also ==
- List of municipalities and towns in Slovakia
