= Nižná Pisaná =

- Municipality
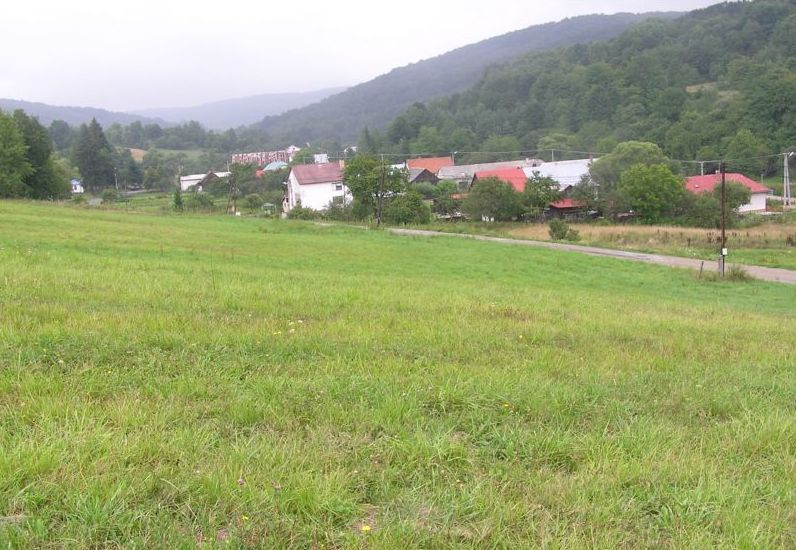

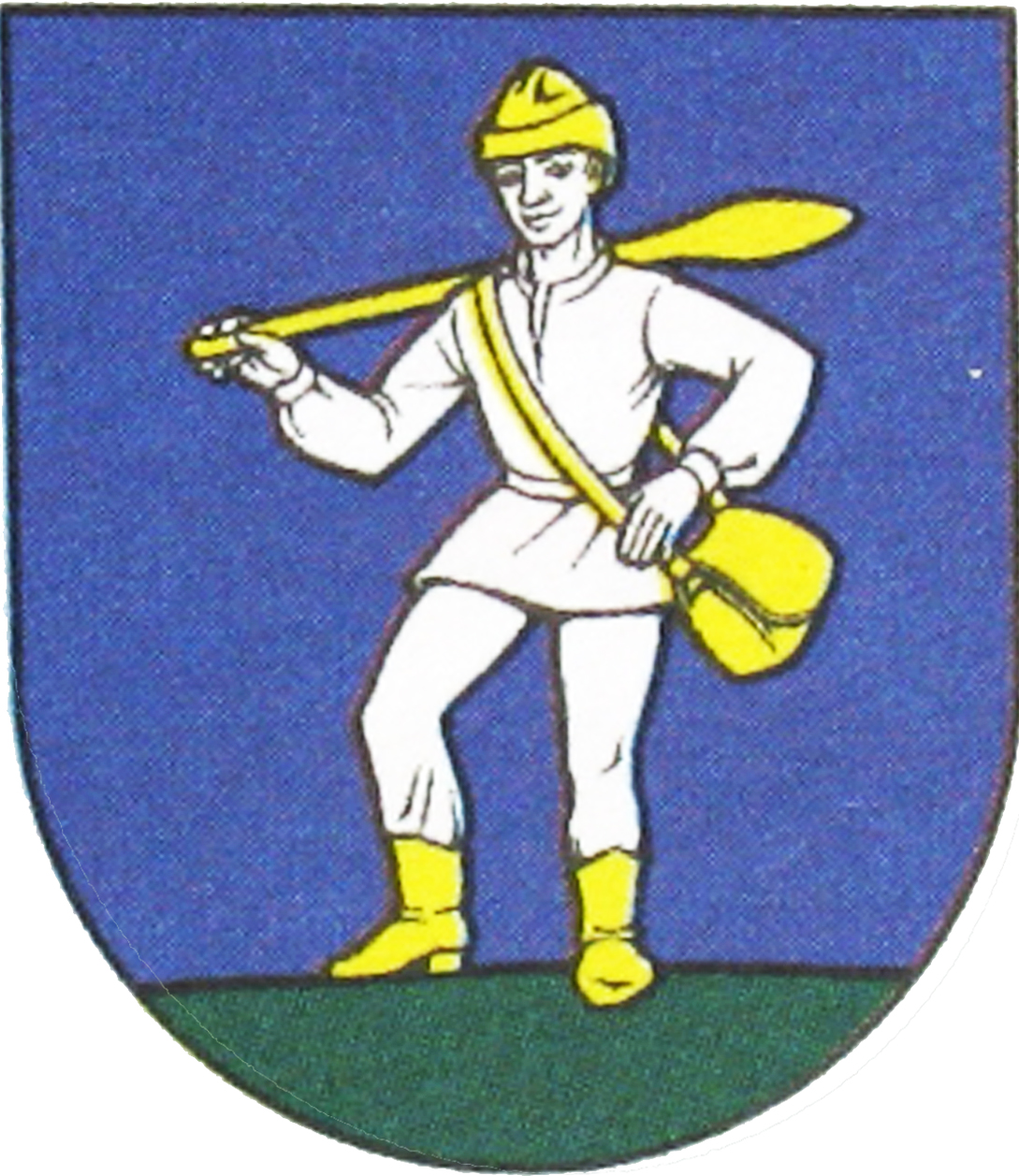
- Flag Coat of arms

- Location of Nižná Pisaná in the Prešov Region Location of Nižná Pisaná in Slovakia
- Coordinates: 49.38°N 21.60°E
- Country: Slovakia
- Region: Prešov Region
- District: Svidník District
- First mentioned: 1600

Area
  - Total: 7.38 km^{2} (2.85 sq mi)
- Elevation: 321 m (1,053 ft)

Population (2025)
  - Total: 75
- Time zone: UTC+1 (CET)
  - Summer (DST): UTC+2 (CEST)
- Postal code: 900 1
- Area code: +421 54
- Vehicle registration plate (until 2022): SK
- Website: niznapisana.webnode.sk

Nižná Pisaná (Rusyn: Нижня Писана; Hungarian: Alsóhímes, until 1899: Alsó-Piszana) is a village and municipality in Svidník District in the Prešov Region of north-eastern Slovakia.

== History ==
In historical records the village was first mentioned in 1600.

== Geography ==
The municipality lies at an altitude of 321 metres (1,053 ft) and covers an area of 7.38 km^{2} (2.85 sq mi) (2025).

== Population ==
Population statistic (10 years)
Year	1995	2005	2015	2025
Count	85	99	85	75
Difference		+16.47%	−14.14%	−11.76%

Population statistic
Year	2024	2025
Count	75	75
Difference		+0%

It has a population of 75 people (31 December 2025).

=== Ethnicity ===
Census 2021 (1+ %)
Ethnicity	Number	Fraction
Slovak	71	85.54%
Rusyn	47	56.62%
Ukrainian	6	7.22%
Not found out	2	2.4%
Polish	1	1.2%
Hungarian	1	1.2%
Total	83	

In year 2021 was 83 people by ethnicity 71 as Slovak, 47 as Rusyn, 6 as Ukrainian, 2 as Not found out, 1 as Polish and 1 as Hungarian.

Note on population: The difference values of population numbers in the table "Population statistic" and in the sections "Ethnicity" & "Religion" is caused by the use of various statistical methods.

=== Religion ===
Census 2021 (1+ %)
Religion	Number	Fraction
Greek Catholic Church	39	46.99%
Eastern Orthodox Church	34	40.96%
Roman Catholic Church	7	8.43%
None	2	2.41%
Not found out	1	1.2%
Total	83	

In year 2021 was 83 people by religion 39 from Greek Catholic Church, 34 from Eastern Orthodox Church, 7 from Roman Catholic Church, 2 from None and 1 from Not found out.
