= Vyšná Pisaná =

- Municipality
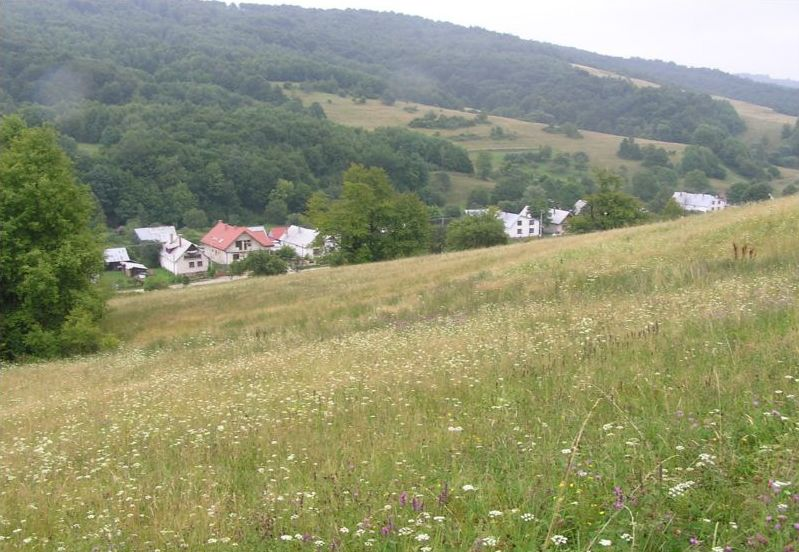

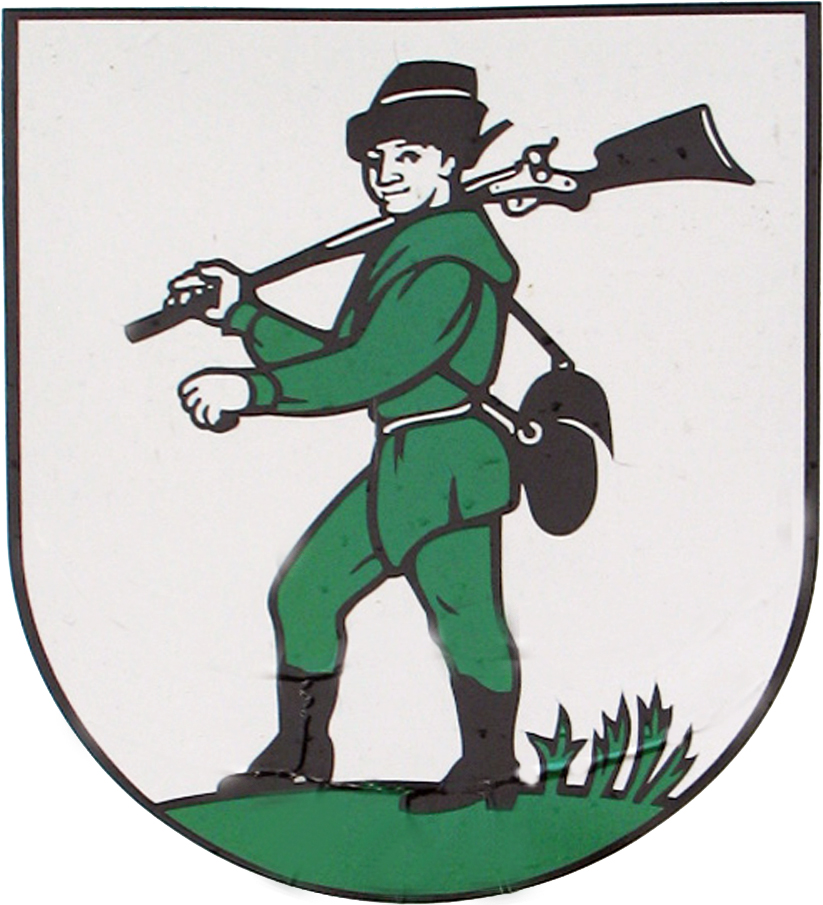
- Flag Coat of arms

- Location of Vyšná Pisaná in the Prešov Region Location of Vyšná Pisaná in Slovakia
- Coordinates: 49.40°N 21.62°E
- Country: Slovakia
- Region: Prešov Region
- District: Svidník District
- First mentioned: 1600

Area
  - Total: 9.49 km^{2} (3.66 sq mi)
- Elevation: 364 m (1,194 ft)

Population (2025)
  - Total: 72
- Time zone: UTC+1 (CET)
  - Summer (DST): UTC+2 (CEST)
- Postal code: 900 1
- Area code: +421 54
- Vehicle registration plate (until 2022): SK
- Website: www.vysnapisana.sk/sk/

Vyšná Pisaná (Hungarian: Felsőhímes, until 1899: Felső-Piszana) is a village and municipality in Svidník District of the Prešov Region of north-eastern Slovakia.

== History ==
In historical records, this village was first mentioned in 1600.

== Geography ==
The municipality lies at an altitude of 364 metres (1,194 ft) and covers an area of 9.49 km^{2} (3.66 sq mi) (2025).

== Population ==
Population statistic (10 years)
Year	1995	2005	2015	2025
Count	80	82	72	72
Difference		+2.5%	−12.19%	+0%

Population statistic
Year	2024	2025
Count	74	72
Difference		−2.70%

It has a population of 72 people (31 December 2025).

=== Ethnicity ===
Census 2021 (1+ %)
Ethnicity	Number	Fraction
Rusyn	47	72.3%
Slovak	40	61.53%
Ukrainian	2	3.07%
Hungarian	1	1.53%
Total	65	

In year 2021 was 65 people by ethnicity 47 as Rusyn, 40 as Slovak, 2 as Ukrainian and 1 as Hungarian.

Note on population: The difference values of population numbers in the table "Population statistic" and in the sections "Ethnicity" & "Religion" is caused by the use of various statistical methods.

=== Religion ===
Census 2021 (1+ %)
Religion	Number	Fraction
Greek Catholic Church	39	60%
Eastern Orthodox Church	16	24.62%
Roman Catholic Church	5	7.69%
None	3	4.62%
Other	1	1.54%
Buddhism	1	1.54%
Total	65	

In year 2021 was 65 people by religion 39 from Greek Catholic Church, 16 from Eastern Orthodox Church, 5 from Roman Catholic Church, 3 from None, 1 from Other and 1 from Buddhism.
