= Nižný Orlík =

- Municipality
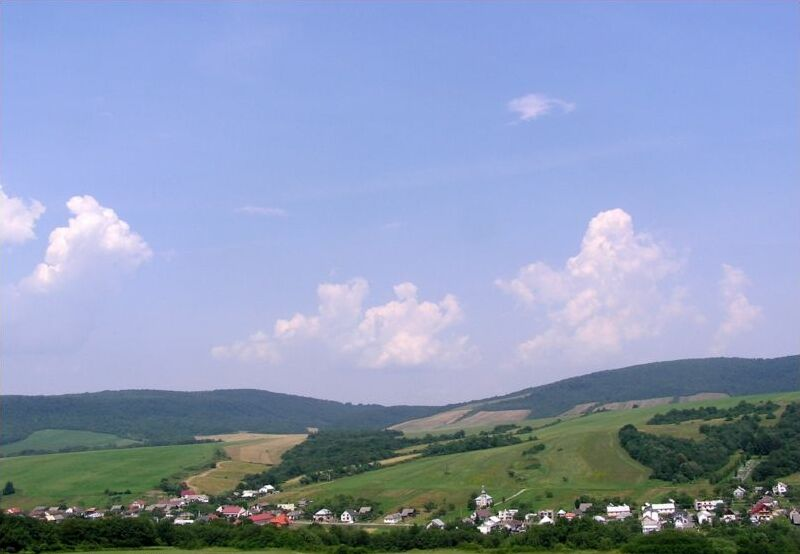

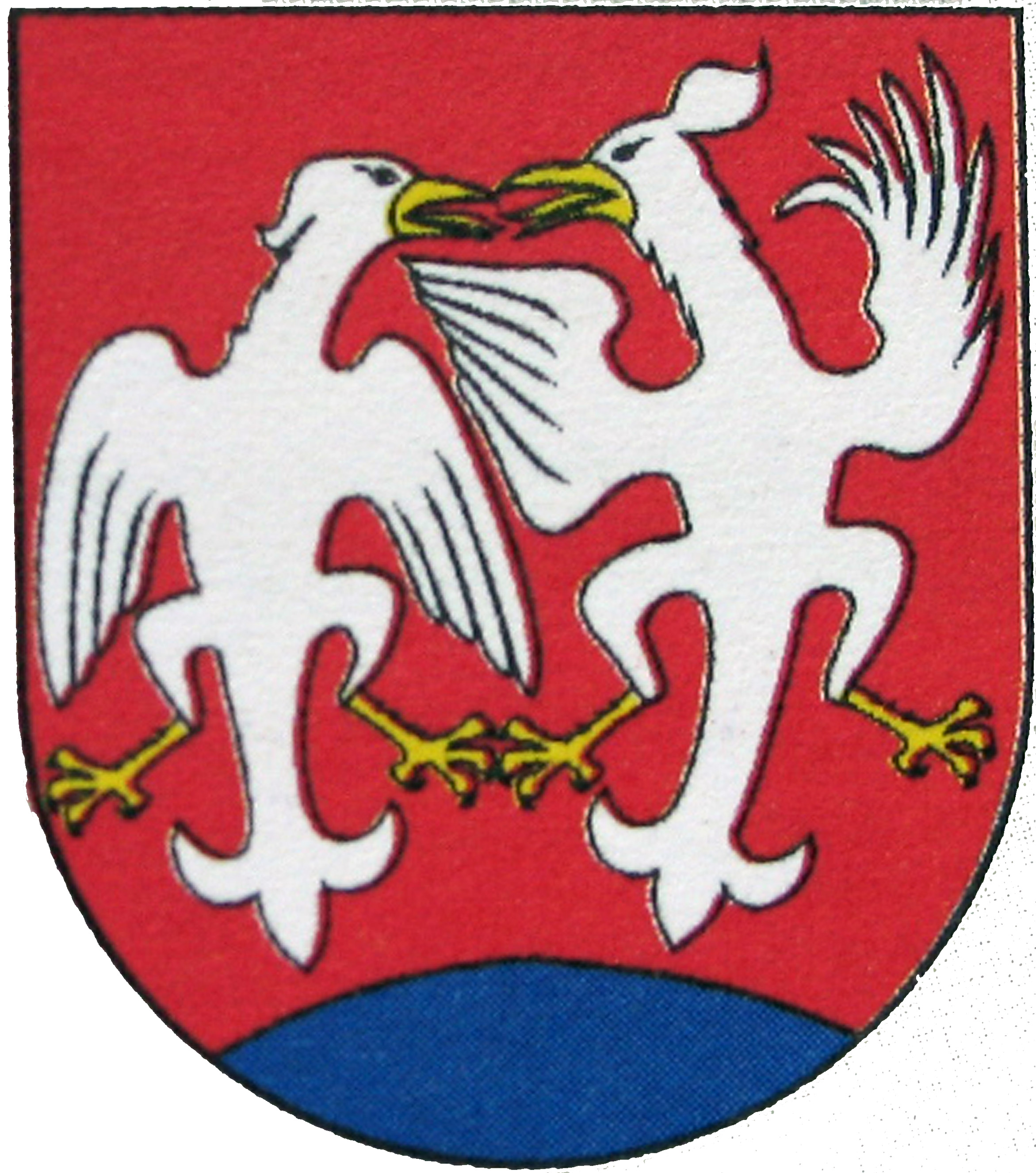
- Flag Coat of arms

- Location of Nižný Orlík in the Prešov Region Location of Nižný Orlík in Slovakia
- Coordinates: 49.33°N 21.53°E
- Country: Slovakia
- Region: Prešov Region
- District: Svidník District
- First mentioned: 1357

Area
  - Total: 9.39 km^{2} (3.63 sq mi)
- Elevation: 257 m (843 ft)

Population (2025)
  - Total: 333
- Time zone: UTC+1 (CET)
  - Summer (DST): UTC+2 (CEST)
- Postal code: 901 1
- Area code: +421 54
- Vehicle registration plate (until 2022): SK
- Website: www.niznyorlik.eu

Nižný Orlík (Rusyn: Нижнїй Верліх; Hungarian: Alsóodor) is a village and municipality in Svidník District in the Prešov Region of north-eastern Slovakia.

== History ==
In historical records the village was first mentioned in 1357.

== Geography ==
The municipality lies at an altitude of 257 metres (843 ft) and covers an area of 9.39 km^{2} (3.63 sq mi) (2025).

== Population ==
Population statistic (10 years)
Year	1995	2005	2015	2025
Count	257	267	312	333
Difference		+3.89%	+16.85%	+6.73%

Population statistic
Year	2024	2025
Count	334	333
Difference		−0.29%

It has a population of 333 people (31 December 2025).

=== Ethnicity ===
Census 2021 (1+ %)
Ethnicity	Number	Fraction
Slovak	257	81.07%
Rusyn	138	43.53%
Ukrainian	13	4.1%
Not found out	9	2.83%
Total	317	

In year 2021 was 317 people by ethnicity 257 as Slovak, 138 as Rusyn, 13 as Ukrainian, 9 as Not found out, 3 as Czech, 2 as Bulgarian and 1 as Russian.

Note on population: The difference values of population numbers in the table "Population statistic" and in the sections "Ethnicity" & "Religion" is caused by the use of various statistical methods.

=== Religion ===
Census 2021 (1+ %)
Religion	Number	Fraction
Greek Catholic Church	124	39.12%
Eastern Orthodox Church	120	37.85%
Roman Catholic Church	34	10.73%
None	27	8.52%
Not found out	8	2.52%
Total	317	

In year 2021 was 317 people by religion 124 from Greek Catholic Church, 120 from Eastern Orthodox Church, 34 from Roman Catholic Church, 27 from None, 8 from Not found out, 1 from Calvinist Church, 1 from Paganism and natural spirituality, 1 from Evangelical Church and 1 from Buddhism.
