= Vyšný Orlík =

- Municipality
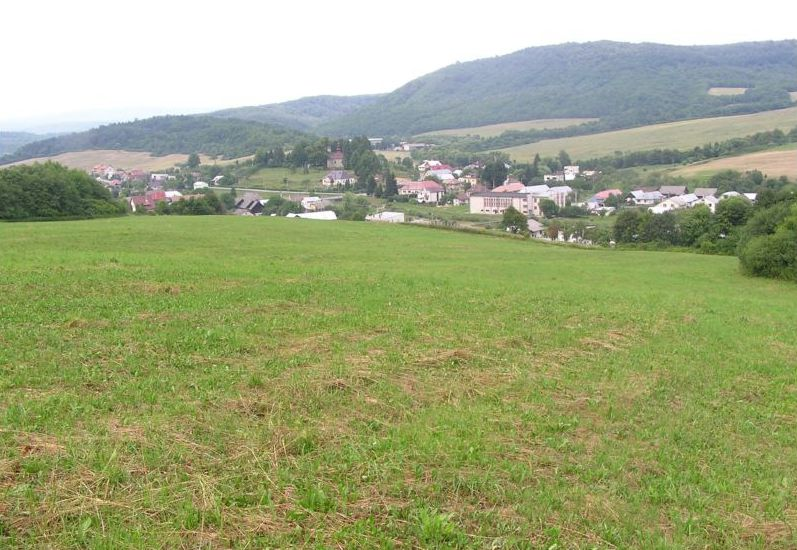

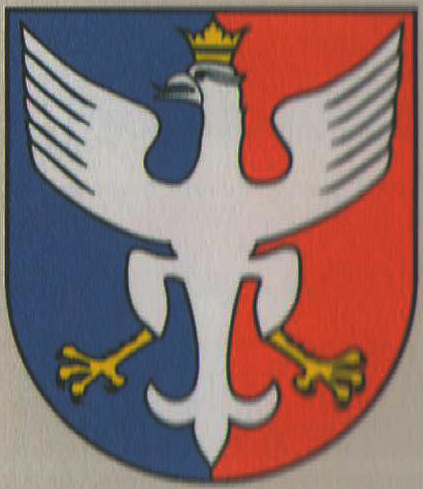
- Flag Coat of arms

- Location of Vyšný Orlík in the Prešov Region Location of Vyšný Orlík in Slovakia
- Coordinates: 49.35°N 21.50°E
- Country: Slovakia
- Region: Prešov Region
- District: Svidník District
- First mentioned: 1414

Area
  - Total: 14.71 km^{2} (5.68 sq mi)
- Elevation: 264 m (866 ft)

Population (2025)
  - Total: 380
- Time zone: UTC+1 (CET)
  - Summer (DST): UTC+2 (CEST)
- Postal code: 901 1
- Area code: +421 54
- Vehicle registration plate (until 2022): SK
- Website: www.vysnyorlik.sk

Vyšný Orlík is a village and municipality in Svidník District in the Prešov Region of north-eastern Slovakia.

== History ==
The village was first mentioned in 1414 and had various names throughout history such as Felsoodor (1907-1913) and later, Vyšný Orlík. The Greek Catholic church of the Accession of the Lord was established in 1793 and this village is predominantly Carpatho-Rusyn Greek Catholic.

A more detailed history with photographs can be found at....

Vyšný Orlík - The Carpathian Connection

== Geography ==
The municipality lies at an altitude of 264 metres (866 ft) and covers an area of 14.71 km^{2} (5.68 sq mi) (2025).

== Population ==
Population statistic (10 years)
Year	1995	2005	2015	2025
Count	376	403	373	380
Difference		+7.18%	−7.44%	+1.87%

Population statistic
Year	2024	2025
Count	385	380
Difference		−1.29%

It has a population of 380 people (31 December 2025).

=== Ethnicity ===
Census 2021 (1+ %)
Ethnicity	Number	Fraction
Slovak	272	70.64%
Rusyn	172	44.67%
Romani	51	13.24%
Ukrainian	16	4.15%
Not found out	13	3.37%
Total	385	

In year 2021 was 385 people by ethnicity 272 as Slovak, 172 as Rusyn, 51 as Romani, 16 as Ukrainian, 13 as Not found out, 1 as Russian and 1 as French.

Note on population: The difference values of population numbers in the table "Population statistic" and in the sections "Ethnicity" & "Religion" is caused by the use of various statistical methods.

=== Religion ===
Census 2021 (1+ %)
Religion	Number	Fraction
Eastern Orthodox Church	169	43.9%
Greek Catholic Church	147	38.18%
None	32	8.31%
Roman Catholic Church	20	5.19%
Not found out	10	2.6%
Total	385	

In year 2021 was 385 people by religion 169 from Eastern Orthodox Church, 147 from Greek Catholic Church, 32 from None, 20 from Roman Catholic Church, 10 from Not found out, 3 from Church of the Brethren, 2 from Jehovah's Witnesses, 1 from Evangelical Church and 1 from Ad hoc movements.
