= Šemetkovce =

- Municipality
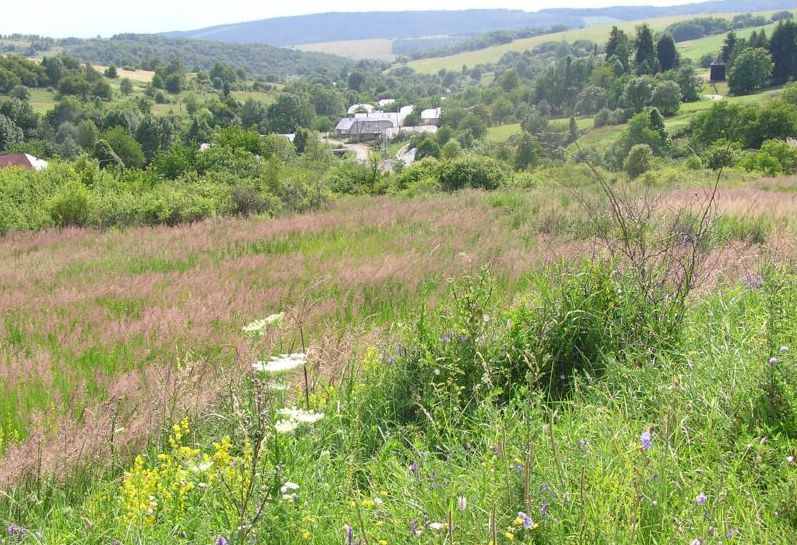

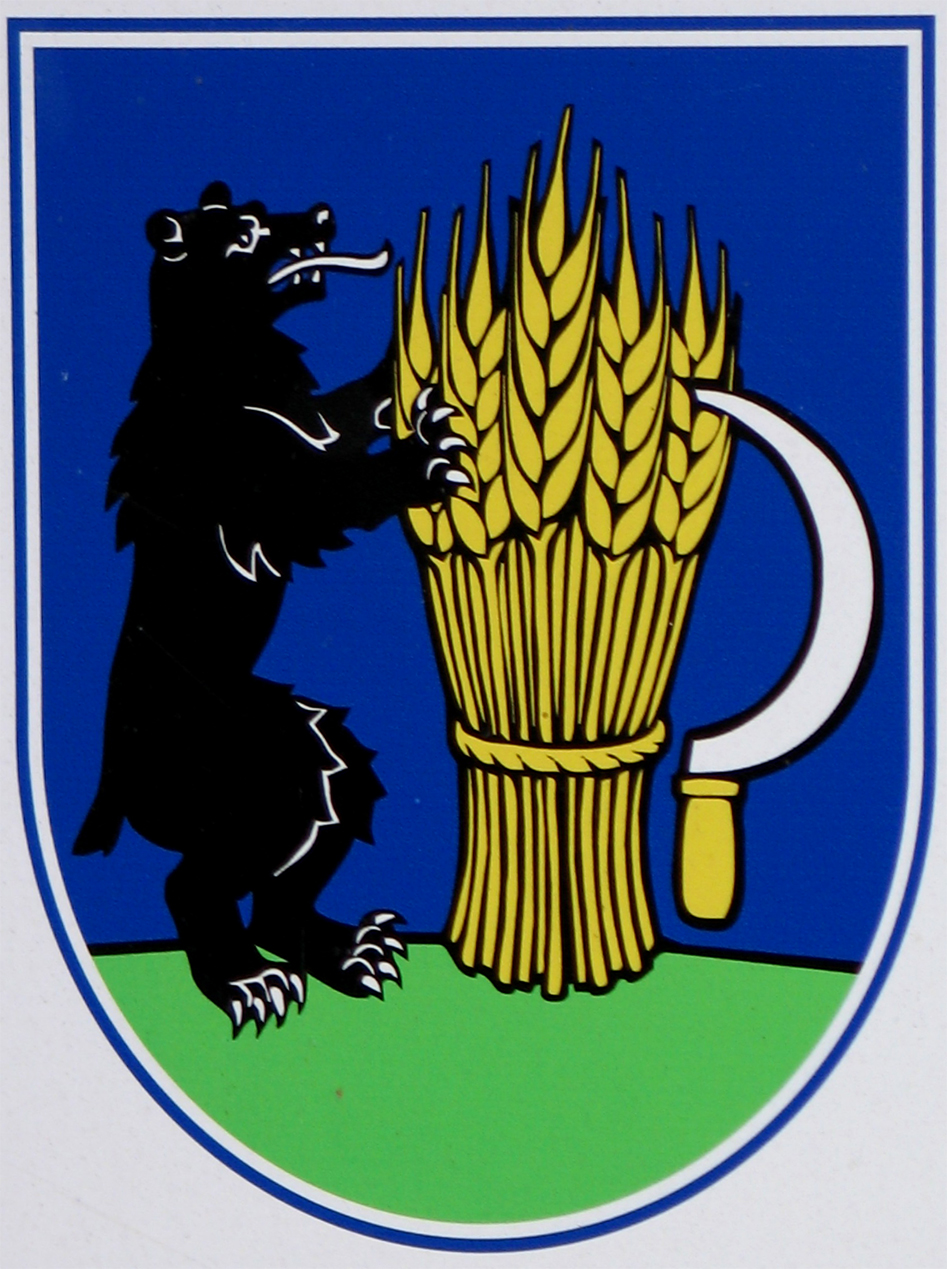
- Flag Coat of arms

- Location of Šemetkovce in the Prešov Region Location of Šemetkovce in Slovakia
- Coordinates: 49.30°N 21.67°E
- Country: Slovakia
- Region: Prešov Region
- District: Svidník District
- First mentioned: 1572

Area
  - Total: 7.07 km^{2} (2.73 sq mi)
- Elevation: 356 m (1,168 ft)

Population (2025)
  - Total: 91
- Time zone: UTC+1 (CET)
  - Summer (DST): UTC+2 (CEST)
- Postal code: 900 3
- Area code: +421 54
- Vehicle registration plate (until 2022): SK
- Website: www.semetkovce.sk

Šemetkovce (Hungarian: Szemes, until 1899: Semetkócz) is a village and municipality in Svidník District in the Prešov Region of north-eastern Slovakia. One of its churches, the Church of Michael the Archangel, is one of the country's wooden treasures.

== History ==
In historical records the village was first mentioned in 1572.

== Geography ==
The municipality lies at an altitude of 356 metres (1,168 ft) and covers an area of 7.07 km^{2} (2.73 sq mi) (2025).

== Population ==
Population statistic (10 years)
Year	1995	2005	2015	2025
Count	104	97	85	91
Difference		−6.73%	−12.37%	+7.05%

Population statistic
Year	2024	2025
Count	90	91
Difference		+1.11%

It has a population of 91 people (31 December 2025).

=== Ethnicity ===
Census 2021 (1+ %)
Ethnicity	Number	Fraction
Slovak	85	94.44%
Rusyn	49	54.44%
Ukrainian	1	1.11%
Polish	1	1.11%
Not found out	1	1.11%
Total	90	

In year 2021 was 90 people by ethnicity 85 as Slovak, 49 as Rusyn, 1 as Ukrainian, 1 as Polish and 1 as Not found out.

Note on population: The difference values of population numbers in the table "Population statistic" and in the sections "Ethnicity" & "Religion" is caused by the use of various statistical methods.

=== Religion ===
Census 2021 (1+ %)
Religion	Number	Fraction
Greek Catholic Church	67	74.44%
Roman Catholic Church	16	17.78%
Eastern Orthodox Church	6	6.67%
None	1	1.11%
Total	90	

In year 2021 was 90 people by religion 67 from Greek Catholic Church, 16 from Roman Catholic Church, 6 from Eastern Orthodox Church and 1 from None.
