= Pstriná =

- Municipality
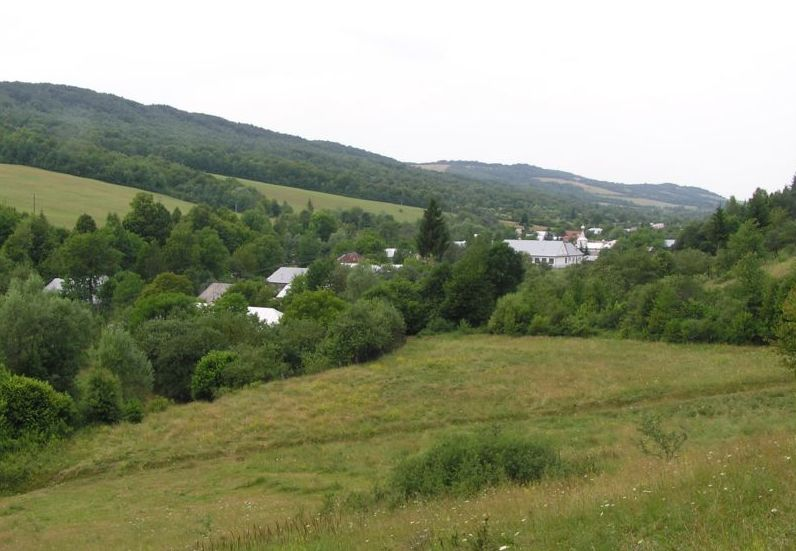

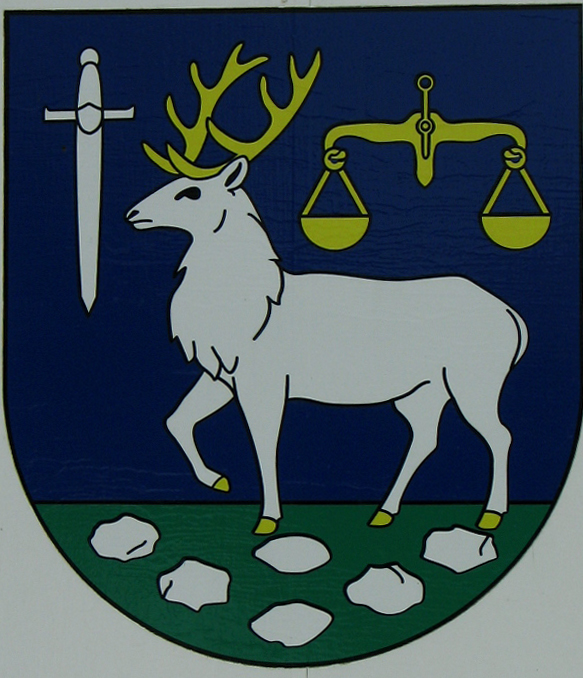
- Flag Coat of arms

- Location of Pstriná in the Prešov Region Location of Pstriná in Slovakia
- Coordinates: 49.30°N 21.75°E
- Country: Slovakia
- Region: Prešov Region
- District: Svidník District
- First mentioned: 1497

Area
  - Total: 6.22 km^{2} (2.40 sq mi)
- Elevation: 325 m (1,066 ft)

Population (2025)
  - Total: 64
- Time zone: UTC+1 (CET)
  - Summer (DST): UTC+2 (CEST)
- Postal code: 900 6
- Area code: +421 54
- Vehicle registration plate (until 2022): SK
- Website: www.obecpstrina.sk

Pstrina (Rusyn: Пстрина; Hungarian: Peszternye, until 1899: Psztrina) is a village and municipality in Svidník District in the Prešov Region of north-eastern Slovakia.

== History ==
In historical records the village was first mentioned in 1497.

== Geography ==
The municipality lies at an altitude of 325 metres (1,066 ft) and covers an area of 6.22 km^{2} (2.40 sq mi) (2025).

== Population ==
Population statistic (10 years)
Year	1995	2005	2015	2025
Count	84	58	63	64
Difference		−30.95%	+8.62%	+1.58%

Population statistic
Year	2024	2025
Count	65	64
Difference		−1.53%

It has a population of 64 people (31 December 2025).

=== Ethnicity ===
Census 2021 (1+ %)
Ethnicity	Number	Fraction
Slovak	43	76.78%
Rusyn	38	67.85%
Czech	4	7.14%
Not found out	2	3.57%
Total	56	

In year 2021 was 56 people by ethnicity 43 as Slovak, 38 as Rusyn, 4 as Czech and 2 as Not found out.

Note on population: The difference values of population numbers in the table "Population statistic" and in the sections "Ethnicity" & "Religion" is caused by the use of various statistical methods.

=== Religion ===
Census 2021 (1+ %)
Religion	Number	Fraction
Eastern Orthodox Church	43	76.79%
Greek Catholic Church	6	10.71%
Roman Catholic Church	3	5.36%
Not found out	1	1.79%
Church of the Brethren	1	1.79%
None	1	1.79%
Apostolic Church	1	1.79%
Total	56	

In year 2021 was 56 people by religion 43 from Eastern Orthodox Church, 6 from Greek Catholic Church, 3 from Roman Catholic Church, 1 from Not found out, 1 from Church of the Brethren, 1 from None and 1 from Apostolic Church.
