= Valkovce =

- Municipality
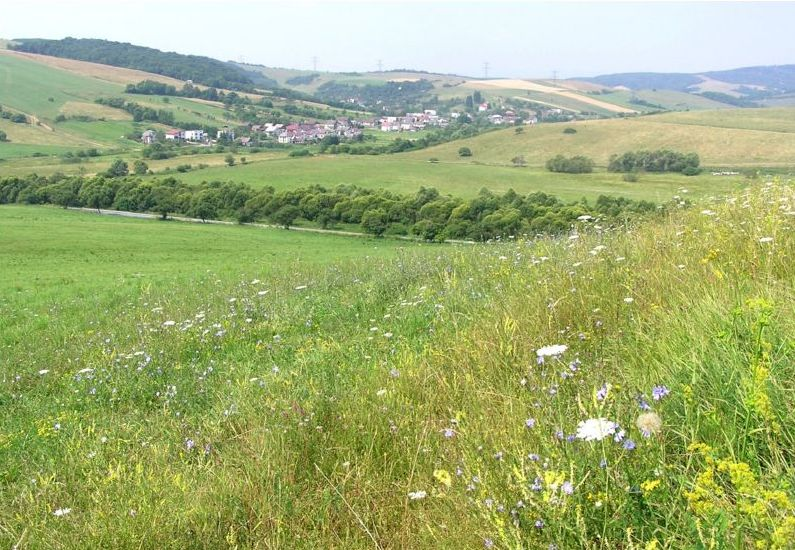

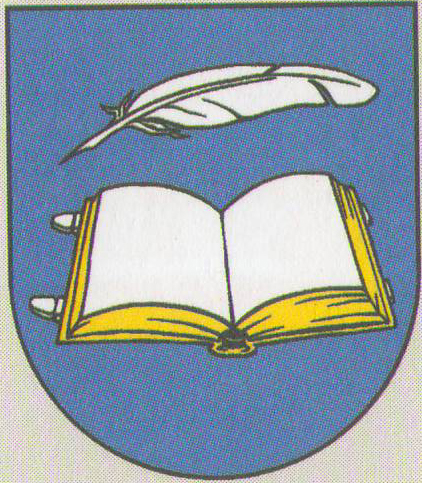
- Flag Coat of arms

- Location of Valkovce in the Prešov Region Location of Valkovce in Slovakia
- Coordinates: 49.17°N 21.53°E
- Country: Slovakia
- Region: Prešov Region
- District: Svidník District
- First mentioned: 1382

Area
  - Total: 6.66 km^{2} (2.57 sq mi)
- Elevation: 220 m (720 ft)

Population (2025)
  - Total: 207
- Time zone: UTC+1 (CET)
  - Summer (DST): UTC+2 (CEST)
- Postal code: 904 2
- Area code: +421 54
- Vehicle registration plate (until 2022): SK
- Website: valkovce.sk

Valkovce (Hungarian: Vajkvágása, until 1899: Valykócz; Rusyn: Вальківцї) is a village and municipality in Svidník District in the Prešov Region of north-eastern Slovakia.

== History ==
In historical records the village was first mentioned in 1382.

== Geography ==
The municipality lies at an altitude of 220 metres (720 ft) and covers an area of 6.66 km^{2} (2.57 sq mi) (2025).

== Population ==
Population statistic (10 years)
Year	1995	2005	2015	2025
Count	231	229	216	207
Difference		−0.86%	−5.67%	−4.16%

Population statistic
Year	2024	2025
Count	206	207
Difference		+0.48%

It has a population of 207 people (31 December 2025).

=== Ethnicity ===
Census 2021 (1+ %)
Ethnicity	Number	Fraction
Slovak	200	94.33%
Rusyn	41	19.33%
Czech	3	1.41%
Total	212	

In year 2021 was 212 people by ethnicity 200 as Slovak, 41 as Rusyn, 3 as Czech, 2 as Not found out, 1 as Ukrainian and 1 as Hungarian.

Note on population: The difference values of population numbers in the table "Population statistic" and in the sections "Ethnicity" & "Religion" is caused by the use of various statistical methods.

=== Religion ===
Census 2021 (1+ %)
Religion	Number	Fraction
Greek Catholic Church	156	73.58%
Roman Catholic Church	37	17.45%
None	7	3.3%
Eastern Orthodox Church	5	2.36%
Evangelical Church	3	1.42%
Total	212	

In year 2021 was 212 people by religion 156 from Greek Catholic Church, 37 from Roman Catholic Church, 7 from None, 5 from Eastern Orthodox Church, 3 from Evangelical Church, 2 from Not found out, 1 from Other and not ascertained christian church and 1 from Ad hoc movements.
