= Radoma =

- Municipality
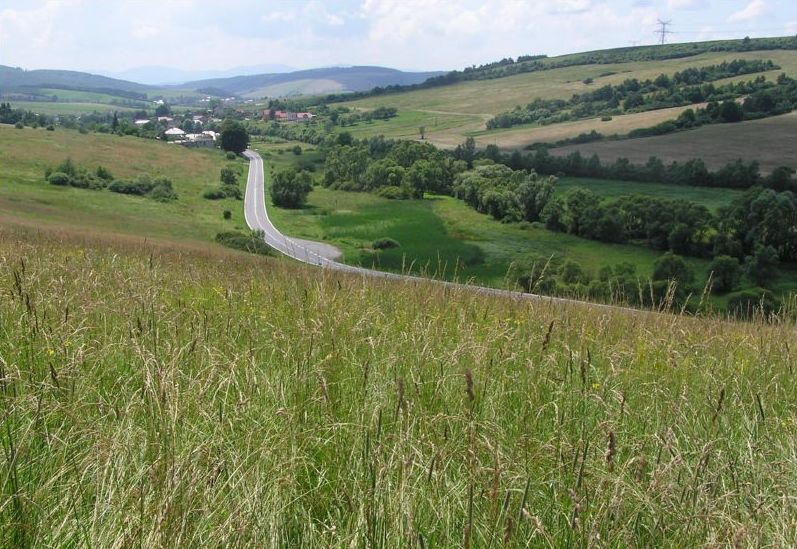

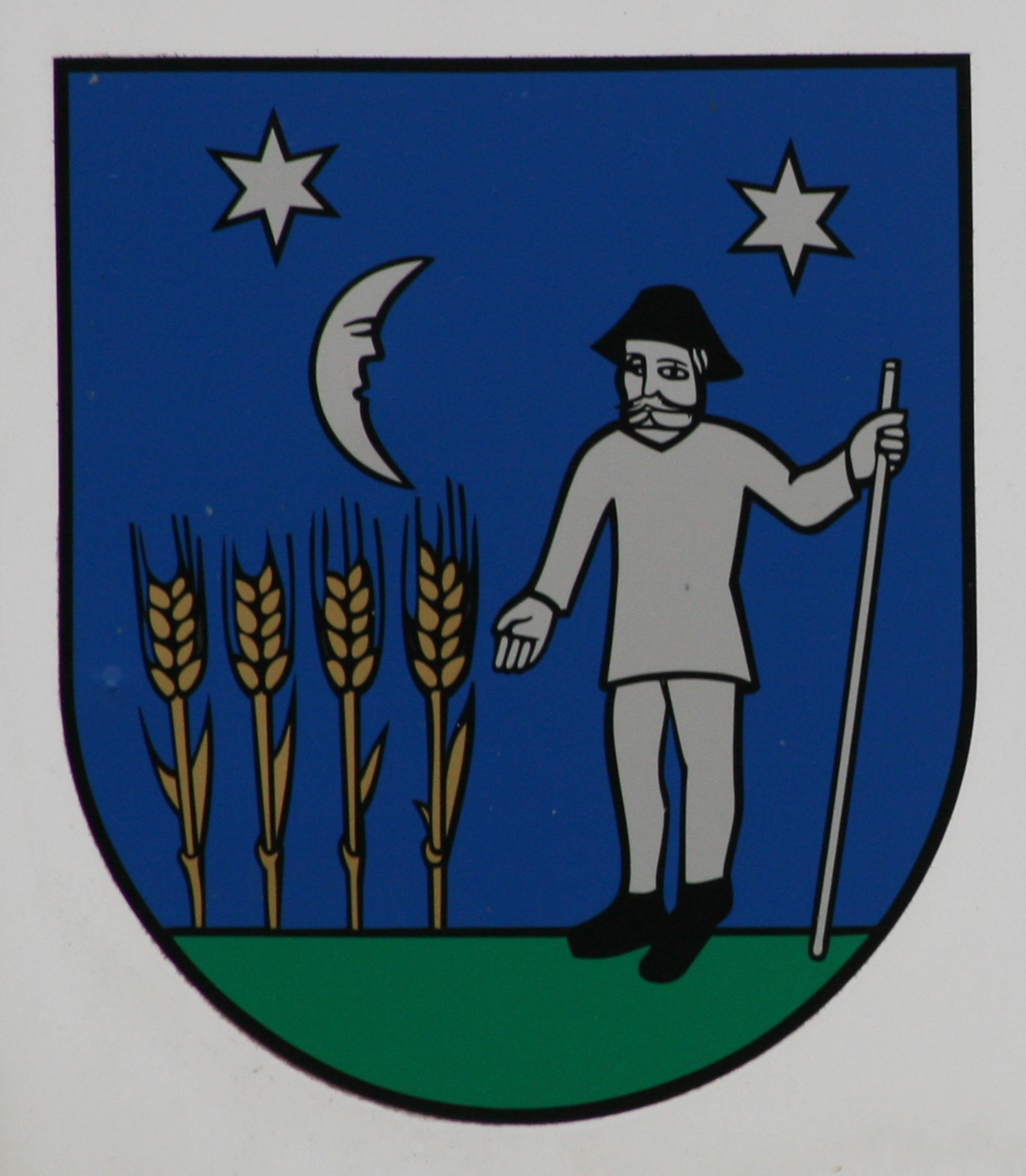
- Flag Coat of arms

- Location of Radoma in the Prešov Region Location of Radoma in Slovakia
- Coordinates: 49.20°N 21.57°E
- Country: Slovakia
- Region: Prešov Region
- District: Svidník District
- First mentioned: 1272

Area
  - Total: 10.91 km^{2} (4.21 sq mi)
- Elevation: 260 m (850 ft)

Population (2025)
  - Total: 416
- Time zone: UTC+1 (CET)
  - Summer (DST): UTC+2 (CEST)
- Postal code: 904 2
- Area code: +421 54
- Vehicle registration plate (until 2022): SK
- Website: www.obecradoma.sk

Radoma is a village and municipality in Svidník District in the Prešov Region of north-eastern Slovakia.

== History ==
In historical records the village was first mentioned in 1272.

== Geography ==
The municipality lies at an altitude of 260 metres (850 ft) and covers an area of 10.91 km^{2} (4.21 sq mi) (2025).

== Population ==
Population statistic (10 years)
Year	1995	2005	2015	2025
Count	418	436	437	416
Difference		+4.30%	+0.22%	−4.80%

Population statistic
Year	2024	2025
Count	425	416
Difference		−2.11%

It has a population of 416 people (31 December 2025).

=== Ethnicity ===
Census 2021 (1+ %)
Ethnicity	Number	Fraction
Slovak	393	92.68%
Not found out	22	5.18%
Rusyn	10	2.35%
Ukrainian	6	1.41%
Romani	5	1.17%
Total	424	

In year 2021 was 424 people by ethnicity 393 as Slovak, 22 as Not found out, 10 as Rusyn, 6 as Ukrainian, 5 as Romani, 4 as Polish and 1 as Russian.

Note on population: The difference values of population numbers in the table "Population statistic" and in the sections "Ethnicity" & "Religion" is caused by the use of various statistical methods.

=== Religion ===
Census 2021 (1+ %)
Religion	Number	Fraction
Roman Catholic Church	341	80.42%
Greek Catholic Church	41	9.67%
None	21	4.95%
Not found out	19	4.48%
Total	424	

In year 2021 was 424 people by religion 341 from Roman Catholic Church, 41 from Greek Catholic Church, 21 from None, 19 from Not found out and 2 from Ad hoc movements.
