= Havranec =

Village in Slovakia

- Municipality
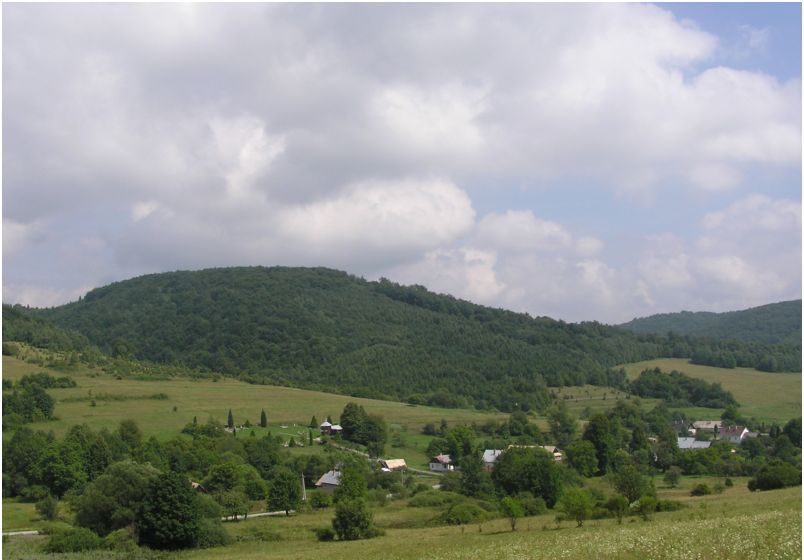

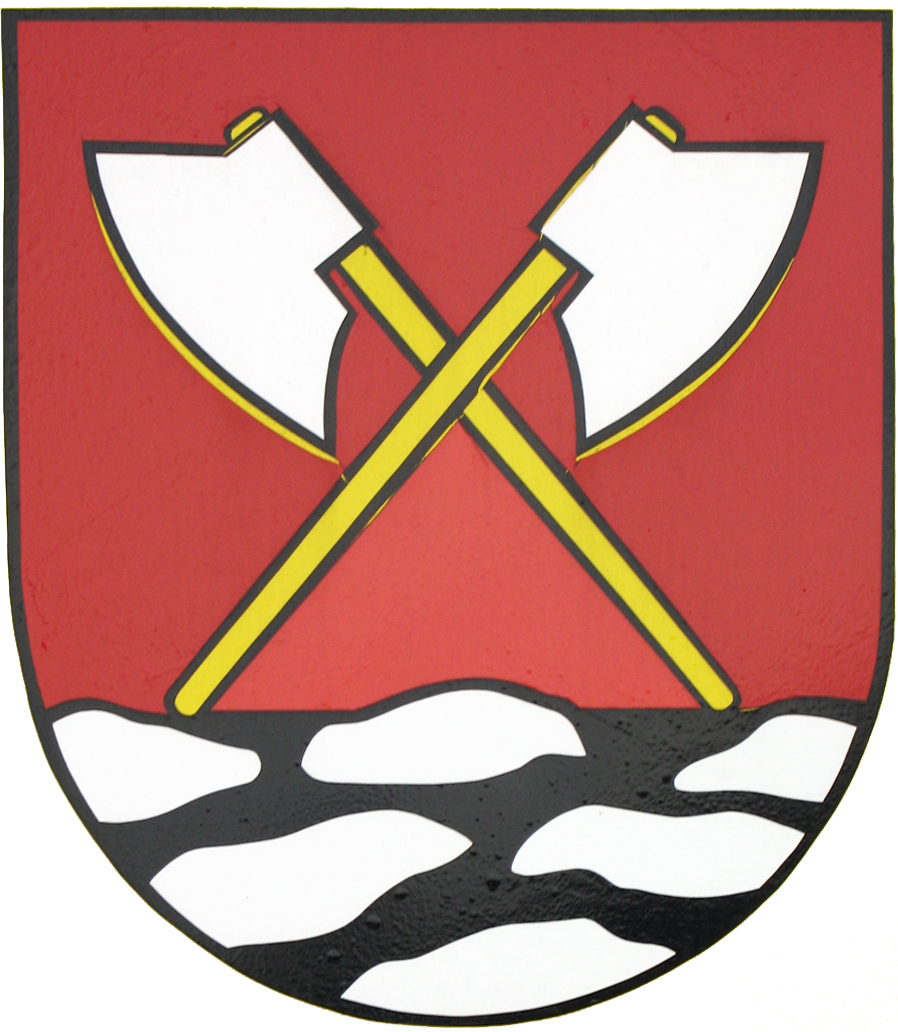
- Flag Coat of arms

- Location of Havranec in the Prešov Region Location of Havranec in Slovakia
- Coordinates: 49.42°N 21.55°E
- Country: Slovakia
- Region: Prešov Region
- District: Svidník District
- First mentioned: 1618

Area
  - Total: 7.65 km^{2} (2.95 sq mi)
- Elevation: 385 m (1,263 ft)

Population (2025)
  - Total: 16
- Time zone: UTC+1 (CET)
  - Summer (DST): UTC+2 (CEST)
- Postal code: 900 2
- Area code: +421 54
- Vehicle registration plate (until 2022): SK
- Website: havranec.sk

Havranec (Rusyn: Гавранець; Hungarian: Kishollód, until 1899: Gavranyecz) is a village and municipality in Svidník District in the Prešov Region of north-eastern Slovakia.

== History ==
In historical records the village was first mentioned in 1618.

== Geography ==
The municipality lies at an altitude of 385 metres (1,263 ft) and covers an area of 7.65 km^{2} (2.95 sq mi) (2025).

== Population ==
Population statistic (10 years)
Year	1995	2005	2015	2025
Count	12	10	13	16
Difference		−16.66%	+30%	+23.07%

Population statistic
Year	2024	2025
Count	15	16
Difference		+6.66%

It has a population of 16 people (31 December 2025).

=== Ethnicity ===
Census 2021 (1+ %)
Ethnicity	Number	Fraction
Slovak	12	80%
Rusyn	4	26.66%
Ukrainian	1	6.66%
Total	15	

In year 2021 was 15 people by ethnicity 12 as Slovak, 4 as Rusyn and 1 as Ukrainian.

Note on population: The difference values of population numbers in the table "Population statistic" and in the sections "Ethnicity" & "Religion" is caused by the use of various statistical methods.

=== Religion ===
Census 2021 (1+ %)
Religion	Number	Fraction
Eastern Orthodox Church	8	53.33%
Greek Catholic Church	4	26.67%
None	2	13.33%
Roman Catholic Church	1	6.67%
Total	15	

In year 2021 was 15 people by religion 8 from Eastern Orthodox Church, 4 from Greek Catholic Church, 2 from None and 1 from Roman Catholic Church.

== Genealogical resources ==
The records for genealogical research are available at the state archive "Statny Archiv in Presov, Slovakia"

- Greek Catholic church records (births/marriages/deaths): 1862-1895 (parish B)

== See also ==
- List of municipalities and towns in Slovakia
