= Mičakovce =

- Municipality
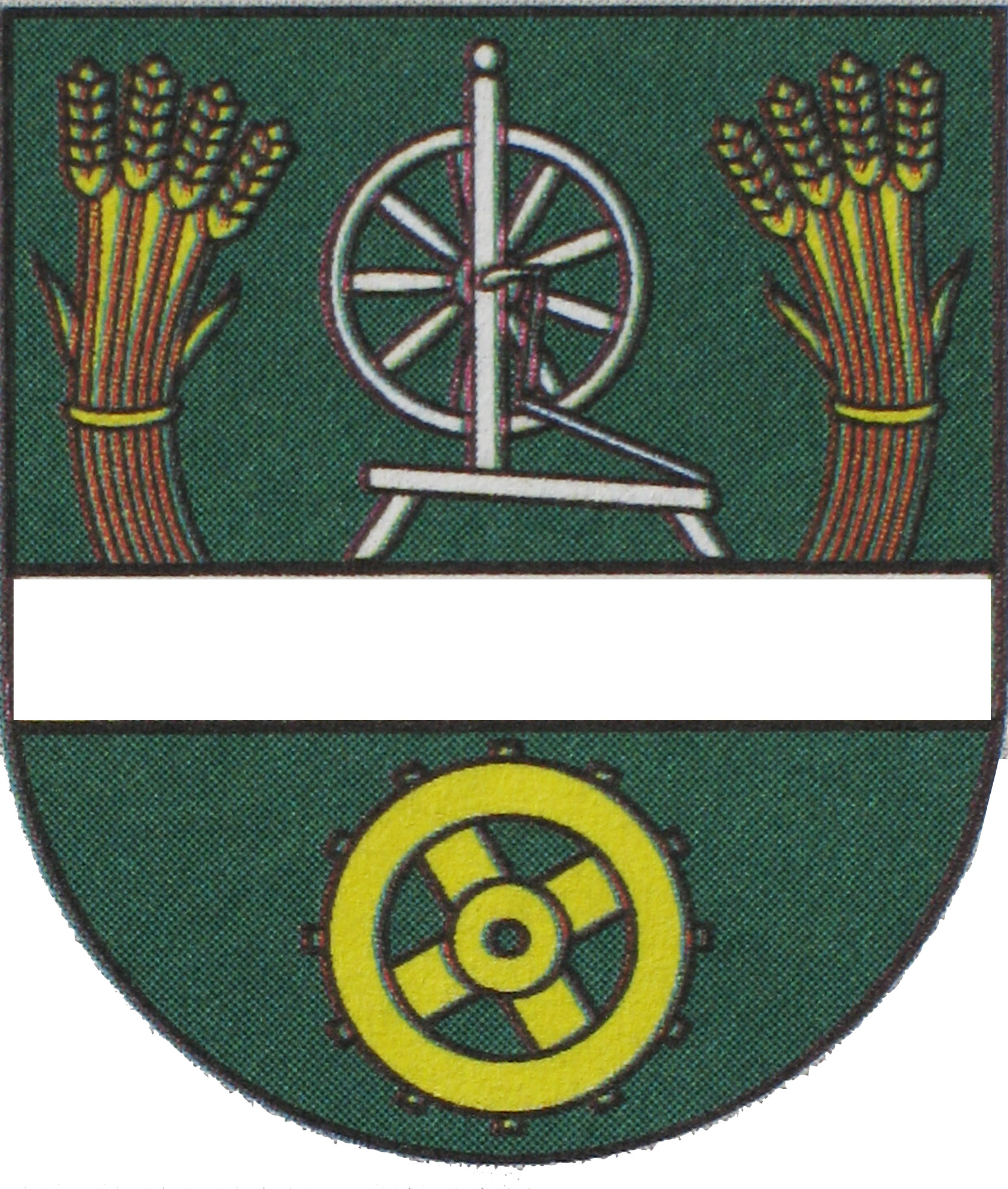
- Flag Coat of arms

- Location of Mičakovce in the Prešov Region Location of Mičakovce in Slovakia
- Coordinates: 49.08°N 21.52°E
- Country: Slovakia
- Region: Prešov Region
- District: Svidník District
- First mentioned: 1390

Area
  - Total: 4.70 km^{2} (1.81 sq mi)
- Elevation: 179 m (587 ft)

Population (2025)
  - Total: 115
- Time zone: UTC+1 (CET)
  - Summer (DST): UTC+2 (CEST)
- Postal code: 870 1
- Area code: +421 54
- Vehicle registration plate (until 2022): SK
- Website: obecmicakovce.webnode.sk

Mičakovce (Hungarian: Mikevágása, until 1899: Micsák) is a village and municipality in Svidník District, Prešov Region, Slovakia.

== History ==
The village was first mentioned in historical records in 1390.

== Geography ==
The municipality lies at an altitude of 179 metres (587 ft) and covers an area of 4.70 km^{2} (1.81 sq mi) (2025).

== Population ==
Population statistic (10 years)
Year	1995	2005	2015	2025
Count	119	129	138	115
Difference		+8.40%	+6.97%	−16.66%

Population statistic
Year	2024	2025
Count	120	115
Difference		−4.16%

It has a population of 115 people (31 December 2025).

=== Ethnicity ===
Census 2021 (1+ %)
Ethnicity	Number	Fraction
Slovak	124	99.2%
Total	125	

In year 2021 was 125 people by ethnicity 124 as Slovak, 1 as Not found out and 1 as Other.

Note on population: The difference values of population numbers in the table "Population statistic" and in the sections "Ethnicity" & "Religion" is caused by the use of various statistical methods.

=== Religion ===
Census 2021 (1+ %)
Religion	Number	Fraction
Roman Catholic Church	61	48.8%
Evangelical Church	38	30.4%
None	17	13.6%
Greek Catholic Church	6	4.8%
Total	125	

In year 2021 was 125 people by religion 61 from Roman Catholic Church, 38 from Evangelical Church, 17 from None, 6 from Greek Catholic Church, 1 from Eastern Orthodox Church, 1 from Not found out and 1 from Church of the Brethren.
