= Soboš =

- Municipality
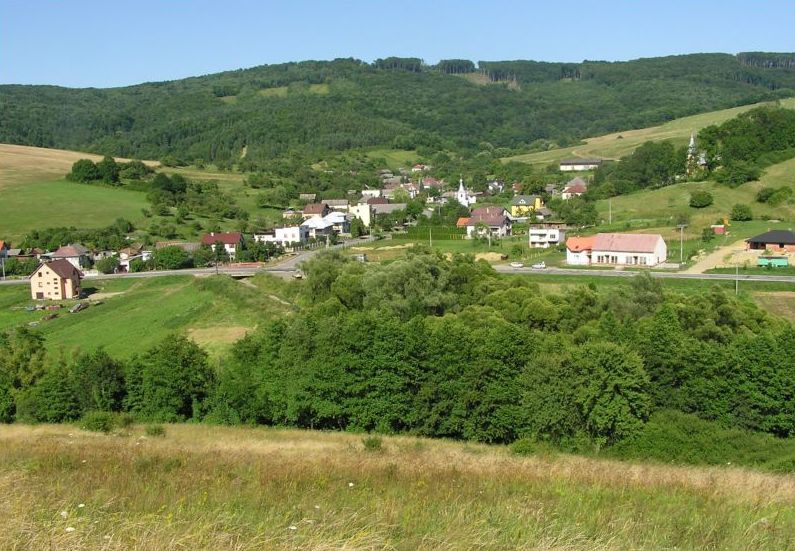

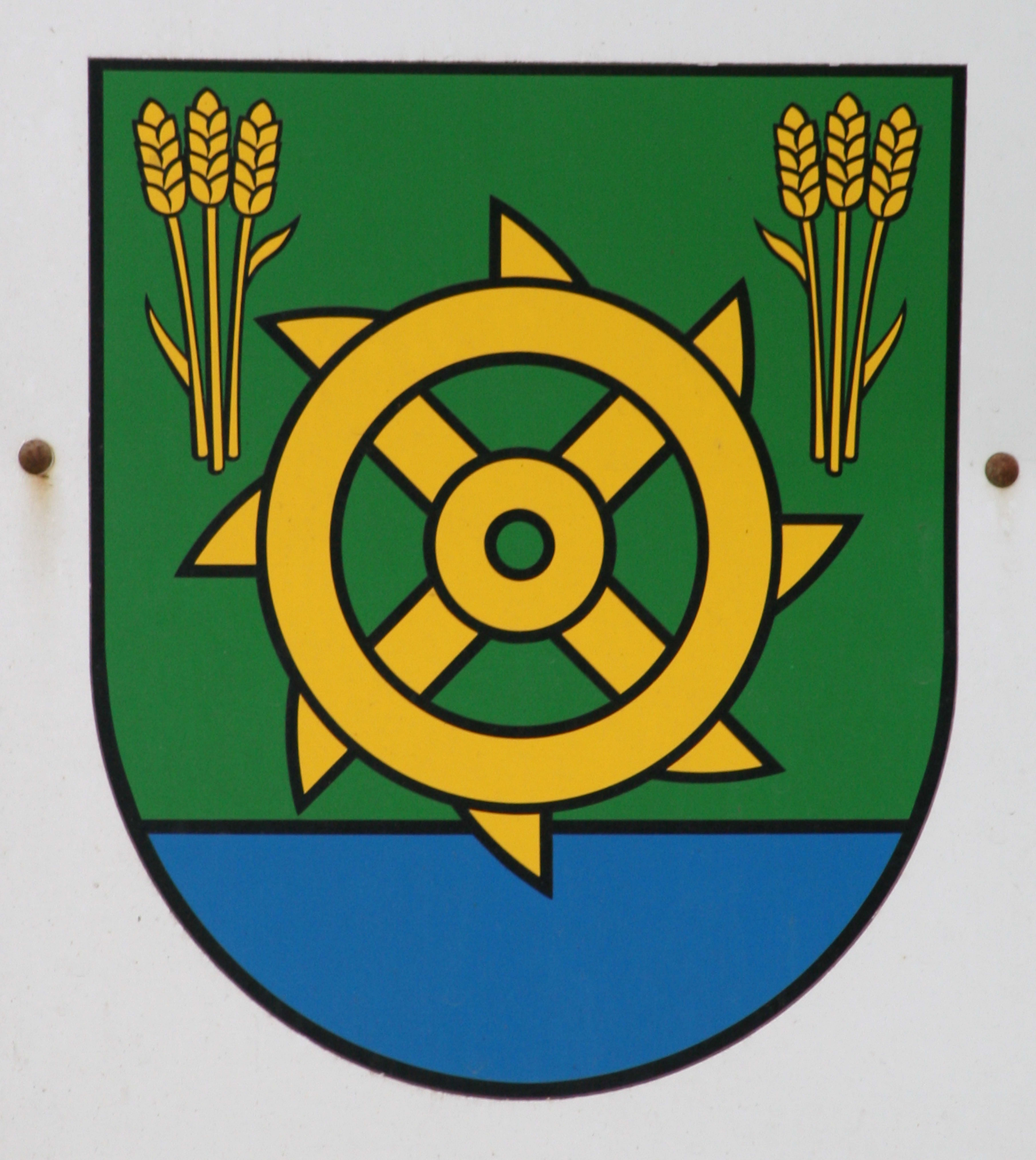
- Flag Coat of arms

- Location of Soboš in the Prešov Region Location of Soboš in Slovakia
- Coordinates: 49.15°N 21.55°E
- Country: Slovakia
- Region: Prešov Region
- District: Svidník District
- First mentioned: 1414

Area
  - Total: 7.16 km^{2} (2.76 sq mi)
- Elevation: 216 m (709 ft)

Population (2025)
  - Total: 144
- Time zone: UTC+1 (CET)
  - Summer (DST): UTC+2 (CEST)
- Postal code: 904 2
- Area code: +421 54
- Vehicle registration plate (until 2022): SK
- Website: www.sobos.sk

Soboš (Hungarian: Szobos) is a village and municipality in Svidník District in the Prešov Region of north-eastern Slovakia.

== History ==
In historical records the village was first mentioned in 1390. After the first census which took place in 1787, it was found that the village had 37 houses and a population of 264.

== Geography ==
The municipality lies at an altitude of 216 metres (709 ft) and covers an area of 7.16 km^{2} (2.76 sq mi) (2025).

== Population ==
Population statistic (10 years)
Year	1995	2005	2015	2025
Count	143	140	140	144
Difference		−2.09%	+0%	+2.85%

Population statistic
Year	2024	2025
Count	141	144
Difference		+2.12%

It has a population of 144 people (31 December 2025).

=== Ethnicity ===
Census 2021 (1+ %)
Ethnicity	Number	Fraction
Slovak	131	90.97%
Rusyn	56	38.88%
Romani	11	7.63%
Not found out	5	3.47%
Total	144	

In year 2021 was 144 people by ethnicity 131 as Slovak, 56 as Rusyn, 11 as Romani and 5 as Not found out.

Note on population: The difference values of population numbers in the table "Population statistic" and in the sections "Ethnicity" & "Religion" is caused by the use of various statistical methods.

=== Religion ===
Census 2021 (1+ %)
Religion	Number	Fraction
Eastern Orthodox Church	61	42.36%
Greek Catholic Church	47	32.64%
Roman Catholic Church	26	18.06%
None	4	2.78%
Not found out	3	2.08%
Jehovah's Witnesses	2	1.39%
Total	144	

In year 2021 was 144 people by religion 61 from Eastern Orthodox Church, 47 from Greek Catholic Church, 26 from Roman Catholic Church, 4 from None, 3 from Not found out, 2 from Jehovah's Witnesses and 1 from Evangelical Church.
