= Kračúnovce =

- Municipality
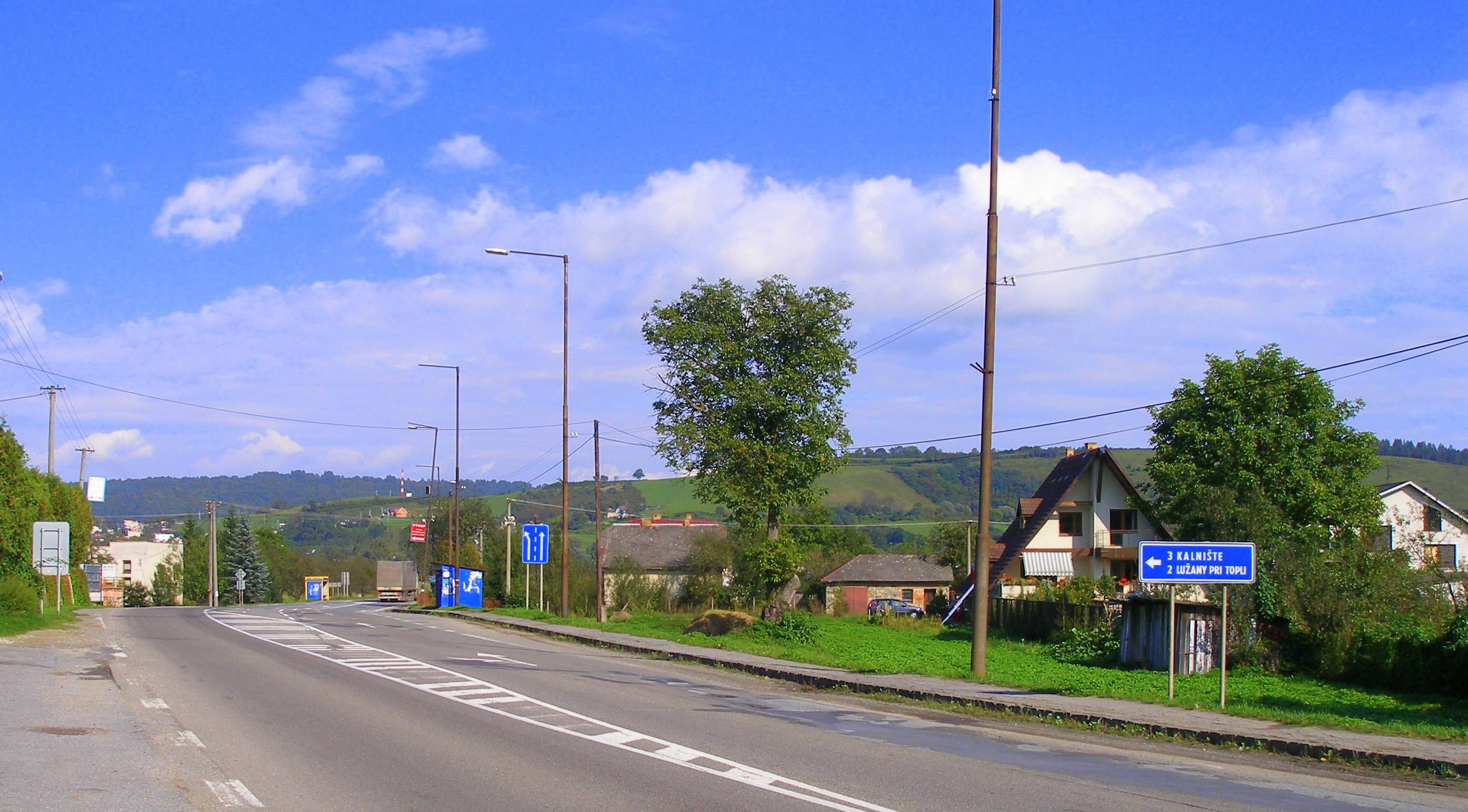

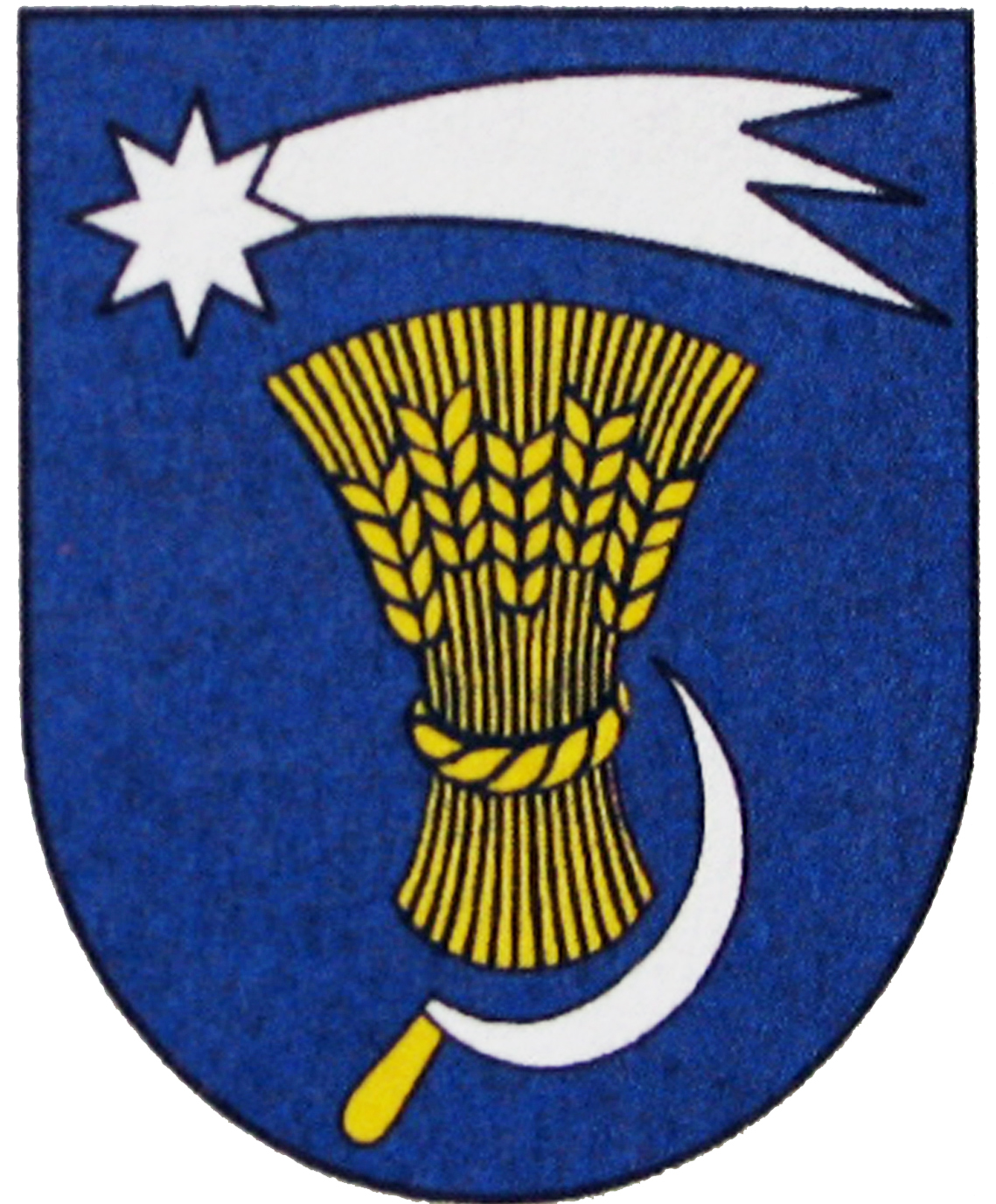
- Flag Coat of arms

- Location of Kračúnovce in the Prešov Region Location of Kračúnovce in Slovakia
- Coordinates: 49.10°N 21.50°E
- Country: Slovakia
- Region: Prešov Region
- District: Svidník District
- First mentioned: 1347

Area
  - Total: 8.25 km^{2} (3.19 sq mi)
- Elevation: 183 m (600 ft)

Population (2025)
  - Total: 1,272
- Time zone: UTC+1 (CET)
  - Summer (DST): UTC+2 (CEST)
- Postal code: 870 1
- Area code: +421 54
- Vehicle registration plate (until 2022): SK
- Website: www.kracunovce.sk

Kračúnovce (Hungarian: Karácsonmező) is a village and municipality in Svidník District in the Prešov Region of north-eastern Slovakia.

== History ==
In historical records the village was first mentioned in 1347.

== Geography ==
The municipality lies at an altitude of 183 metres (600 ft) and covers an area of 8.25 km^{2} (3.19 sq mi) (2025).

== See also ==
- List of municipalities and towns in Slovakia

== Population ==
Population statistic (10 years)
Year	1995	2005	2015	2025
Count	1035	1147	1223	1272
Difference		+10.82%	+6.62%	+4.00%

Population statistic
Year	2024	2025
Count	1273	1272
Difference		−0.07%

It has a population of 1272 people (31 December 2025).

=== Ethnicity ===
Census 2021 (1+ %)
Ethnicity	Number	Fraction
Slovak	1227	99.03%
Rusyn	17	1.37%
Total	1239	

In year 2021 was 1239 people by ethnicity 1227 as Slovak, 17 as Rusyn, 9 as Other, 6 as Not found out, 4 as Romani, 2 as Czech, 1 as Ukrainian, 1 as Russian, 1 as Hungarian and 1 as Albanian.

Note on population: The difference values of population numbers in the table "Population statistic" and in the sections "Ethnicity" & "Religion" is caused by the use of various statistical methods.

=== Religion ===
Census 2021 (1+ %)
Religion	Number	Fraction
Roman Catholic Church	900	72.64%
Evangelical Church	193	15.58%
Greek Catholic Church	84	6.78%
None	44	3.55%
Total	1239	

In year 2021 was 1239 people by religion 900 from Roman Catholic Church, 193 from Evangelical Church, 84 from Greek Catholic Church, 44 from None, 8 from Not found out, 4 from Eastern Orthodox Church, 2 from Paganism and natural spirituality, 2 from Islam, 1 from Jehovah's Witnesses and 1 from Ad hoc movements.

== Genealogical resources ==
The records for genealogical research are available at the state archive "Statny Archiv in Presov, Slovakia"

- Roman Catholic church records (births/marriages/deaths): 1776-1897 (parish A)
- Greek Catholic church records (births/marriages/deaths): 1862-1933 (parish B)
- Lutheran church records (births/marriages/deaths): 1742-1897 (parish B)
