= Medvedie =

- Municipality
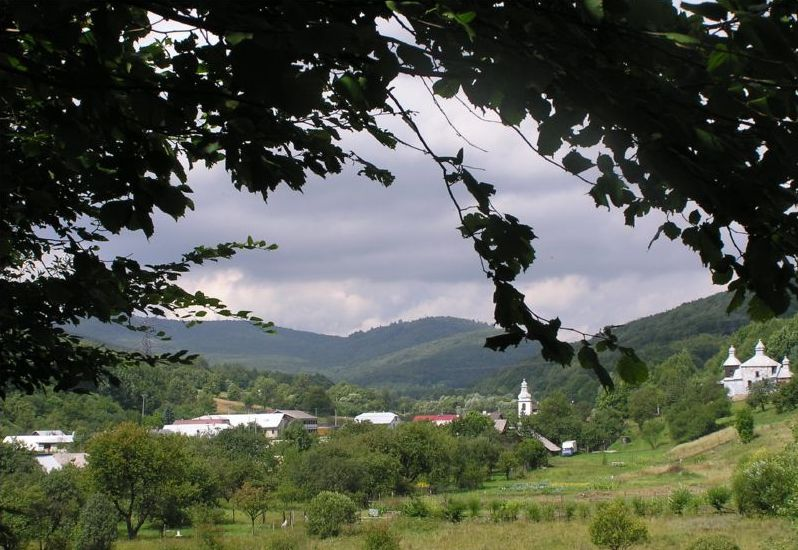

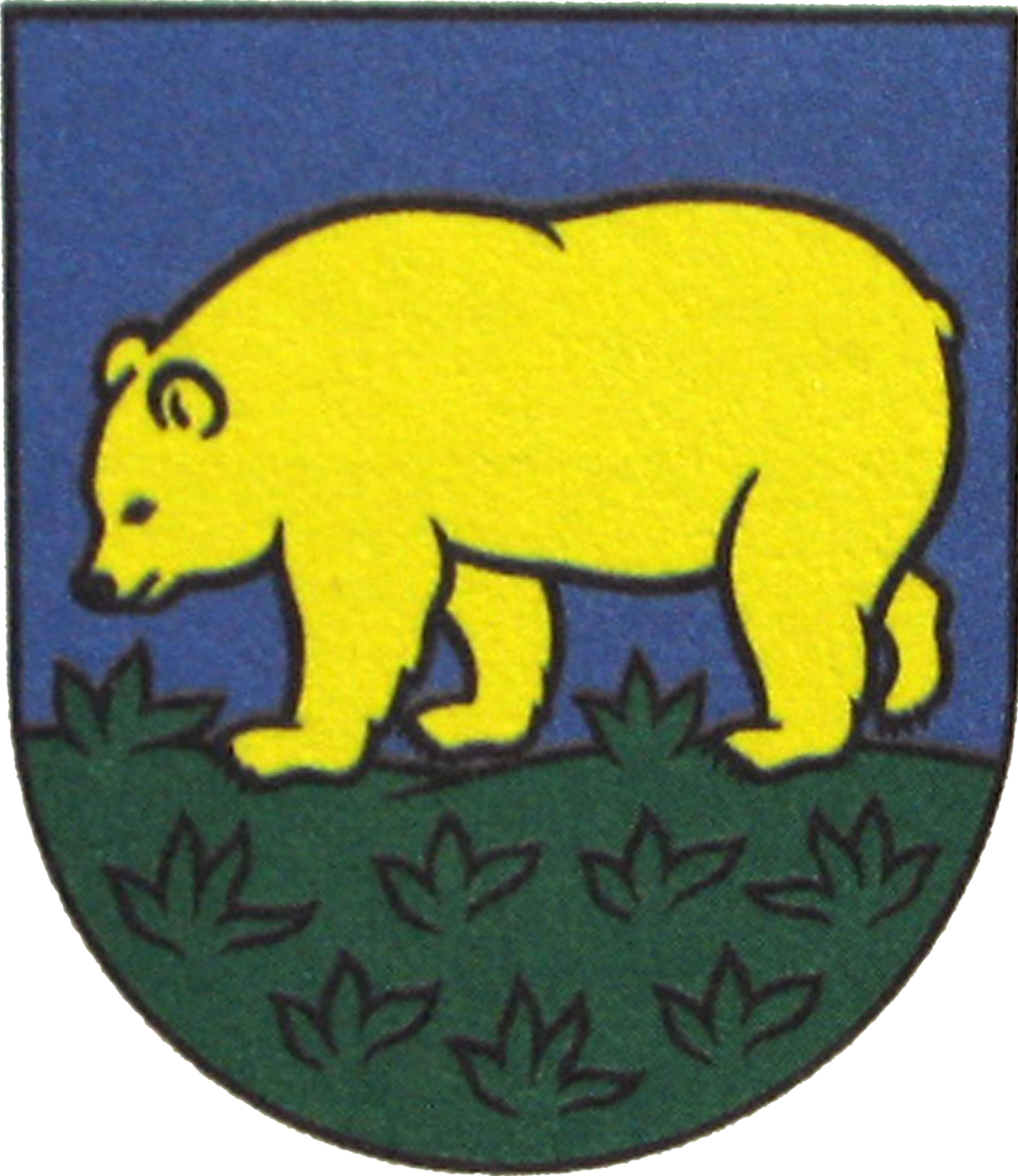
- Flag Coat of arms

- Location of Medvedie in the Prešov Region Location of Medvedie in Slovakia
- Coordinates: 49.40°N 21.65°E
- Country: Slovakia
- Region: Prešov Region
- District: Svidník District
- First mentioned: 1572

Area
  - Total: 5.06 km^{2} (1.95 sq mi)
- Elevation: 365 m (1,198 ft)

Population (2025)
  - Total: 43
- Time zone: UTC+1 (CET)
  - Summer (DST): UTC+2 (CEST)
- Postal code: 900 4
- Area code: +421 54
- Vehicle registration plate (until 2022): SK
- Website: medvedie.sk

Medvedie (Rusyn: Медведже; Hungarian: Kismedvés, until 1899: Medvedze) is a village and municipality in Svidník District in the Prešov Region of north-eastern Slovakia.

== History ==
In historical records the village was first mentioned in 1572.

== Geography ==
The municipality lies at an altitude of 365 metres (1,198 ft) and covers an area of 5.06 km^{2} (1.95 sq mi) (2025).

== Population ==
Population statistic (10 years)
Year	1995	2005	2015	2025
Count	73	56	45	43
Difference		−23.28%	−19.64%	−4.44%

Population statistic
Year	2024	2025
Count	43	43
Difference		+0%

It has a population of 43 people (31 December 2025).

=== Ethnicity ===
Census 2021 (1+ %)
Ethnicity	Number	Fraction
Rusyn	34	77.27%
Slovak	24	54.54%
Russian	6	13.63%
Polish	2	4.54%
Ukrainian	1	2.27%
Total	44	

In year 2021 was 44 people by ethnicity 34 as Rusyn, 24 as Slovak, 6 as Russian, 2 as Polish and 1 as Ukrainian.

Note on population: The difference values of population numbers in the table "Population statistic" and in the sections "Ethnicity" & "Religion" is caused by the use of various statistical methods.

=== Religion ===
Census 2021 (1+ %)
Religion	Number	Fraction
Eastern Orthodox Church	35	79.55%
Roman Catholic Church	5	11.36%
Greek Catholic Church	4	9.09%
Total	44	

In year 2021 was 44 people by religion 35 from Eastern Orthodox Church, 5 from Roman Catholic Church and 4 from Greek Catholic Church.
