= Mestisko =

- Municipality
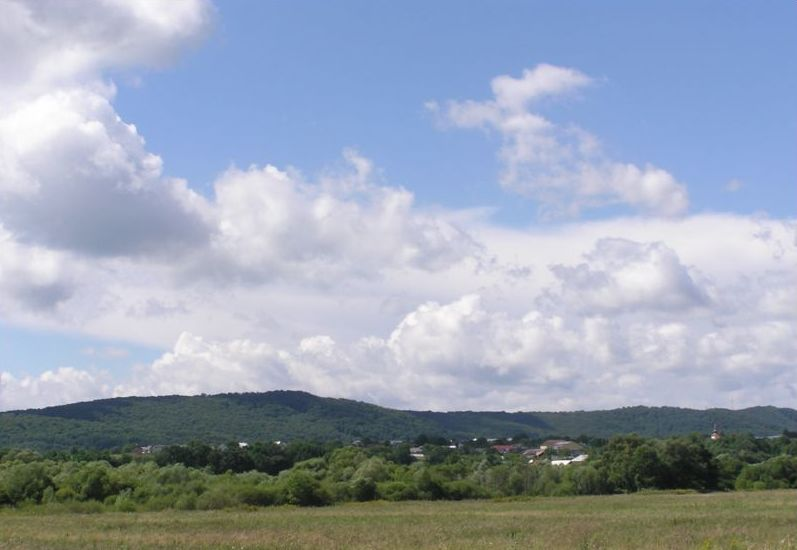

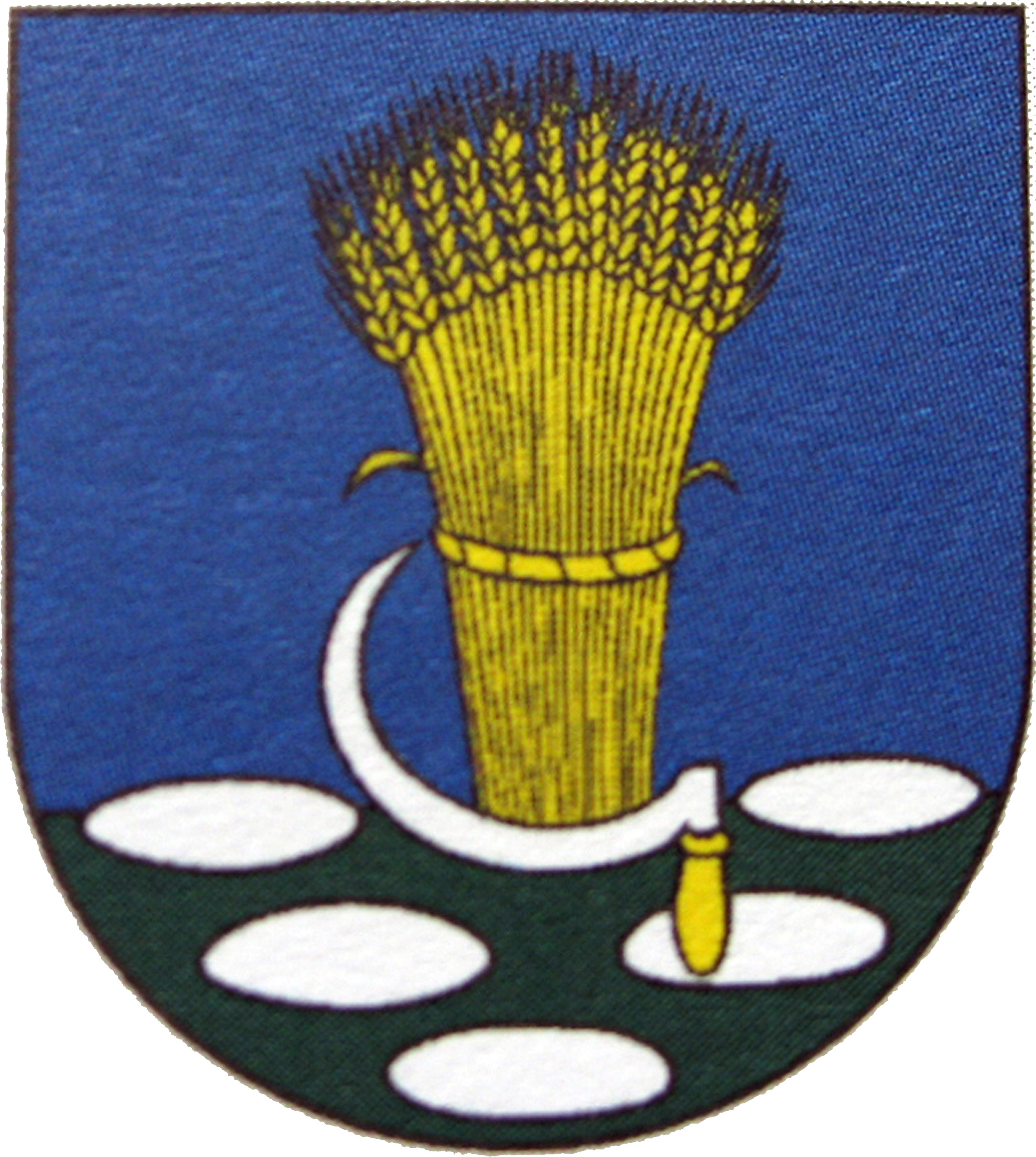
- Flag Coat of arms

- Location of Mestisko in the Prešov Region Location of Mestisko in Slovakia
- Coordinates: 49.25°N 21.58°E
- Country: Slovakia
- Region: Prešov Region
- District: Svidník District
- First mentioned: 1414

Area
  - Total: 11.05 km^{2} (4.27 sq mi)
- Elevation: 250 m (820 ft)

Population (2025)
  - Total: 435
- Time zone: UTC+1 (CET)
  - Summer (DST): UTC+2 (CEST)
- Postal code: 904 1
- Area code: +421 54
- Vehicle registration plate (until 2022): SK
- Website: www.mestisko.sk

Mestisko (Hungarian: Kishely, until 1899: Mesztyiszkó) is a village and municipality in Svidník District in the Prešov Region of north-eastern Slovakia.

== History ==
In historical records the village was first mentioned in 1414.

== Geography ==
The municipality lies at an altitude of 250 metres (820 ft) and covers an area of 11.05 km^{2} (4.27 sq mi) (2025).

== Population ==
Population statistic (10 years)
Year	1995	2005	2015	2025
Count	469	469	467	435
Difference		−1.42%	−0.42%	−6.85%

Population statistic
Year	2024	2025
Count	429	435
Difference		+1.39%

It has a population of 435 people (31 December 2025).

=== Ethnicity ===
Census 2021 (1+ %)
Ethnicity	Number	Fraction
Slovak	435	97.31%
Rusyn	34	7.6%
Not found out	11	2.46%
Total	447	

In year 2021 was 447 people by ethnicity 435 as Slovak, 34 as Rusyn, 11 as Not found out, 4 as Czech, 2 as Hungarian, 1 as Ukrainian, 1 as Polish and 1 as Canadian.

Note on population: The difference values of population numbers in the table "Population statistic" and in the sections "Ethnicity" & "Religion" is caused by the use of various statistical methods.

=== Religion ===
Census 2021 (1+ %)
Religion	Number	Fraction
Roman Catholic Church	318	71.14%
Greek Catholic Church	77	17.23%
Eastern Orthodox Church	24	5.37%
None	24	5.37%
Total	447	

In year 2021 was 447 people by religion 318 from Roman Catholic Church, 77 from Greek Catholic Church, 24 from Eastern Orthodox Church, 24 from None, 3 from Not found out and 1 from Evangelical Church.
