= Mlynárovce =

- Municipality
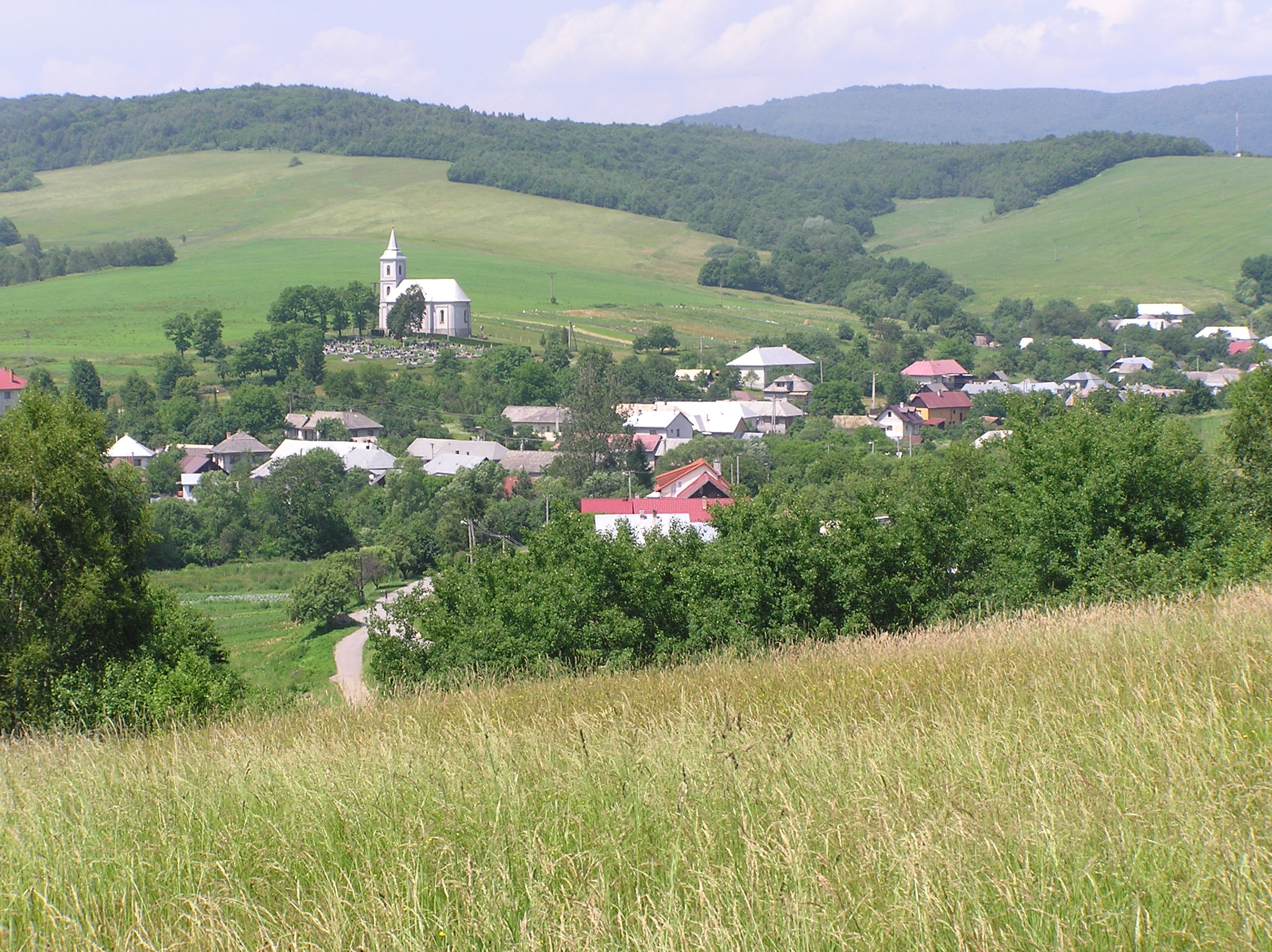

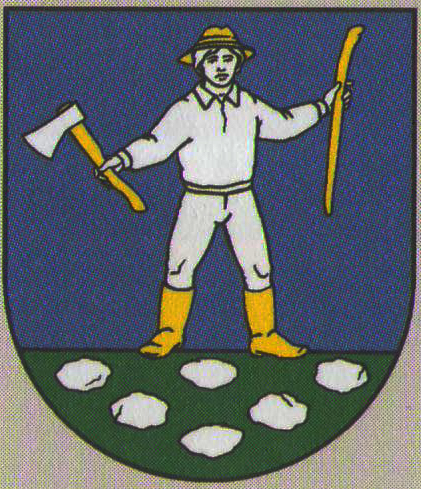
- Flag Coat of arms

- Location of Mlynárovce in the Prešov Region Location of Mlynárovce in Slovakia
- Coordinates: 49.25°N 21.53°E
- Country: Slovakia
- Region: Prešov Region
- District: Svidník District
- First mentioned: 1414

Area
  - Total: 11.22 km^{2} (4.33 sq mi)
- Elevation: 281 m (922 ft)

Population (2025)
  - Total: 221
- Time zone: UTC+1 (CET)
  - Summer (DST): UTC+2 (CEST)
- Postal code: 901 6
- Area code: +421 54
- Vehicle registration plate (until 2022): SK
- Website: obecmlynarovce.webnode.sk

Mlynárovce (Hungarian: Molnárvágása, until 1899: Mlinarócz; Rusyn: Млинарївцї) is a village and municipality in Svidník District in the Prešov Region of north-eastern Slovakia.

== History ==
In historical records the village was first mentioned in 1414.

== Geography ==
The municipality lies at an altitude of 281 metres (922 ft) and covers an area of 11.22 km^{2} (4.33 sq mi) (2025).

== Population ==
Population statistic (10 years)
Year	1995	2005	2015	2025
Count	215	231	218	221
Difference		+7.44%	−5.62%	+1.37%

Population statistic
Year	2024	2025
Count	221	221
Difference		+0%

It has a population of 221 people (31 December 2025).

=== Ethnicity ===
Census 2021 (1+ %)
Ethnicity	Number	Fraction
Slovak	190	88.37%
Rusyn	58	26.97%
Romani	36	16.74%
Not found out	7	3.25%
Total	215	

In year 2021 was 215 people by ethnicity 190 as Slovak, 58 as Rusyn, 36 as Romani, 7 as Not found out, 1 as Czech and 1 as Russian.

Note on population: The difference values of population numbers in the table "Population statistic" and in the sections "Ethnicity" & "Religion" is caused by the use of various statistical methods.

=== Religion ===
Census 2021 (1+ %)
Religion	Number	Fraction
Greek Catholic Church	162	75.35%
Roman Catholic Church	30	13.95%
None	10	4.65%
Eastern Orthodox Church	6	2.79%
Not found out	4	1.86%
Total	215	

In year 2021 was 215 people by religion 162 from Greek Catholic Church, 30 from Roman Catholic Church, 10 from None, 6 from Eastern Orthodox Church, 4 from Not found out, 1 from Other, 1 from Evangelical Church and 1 from Buddhism.
