= Rakovčík =

- Municipality
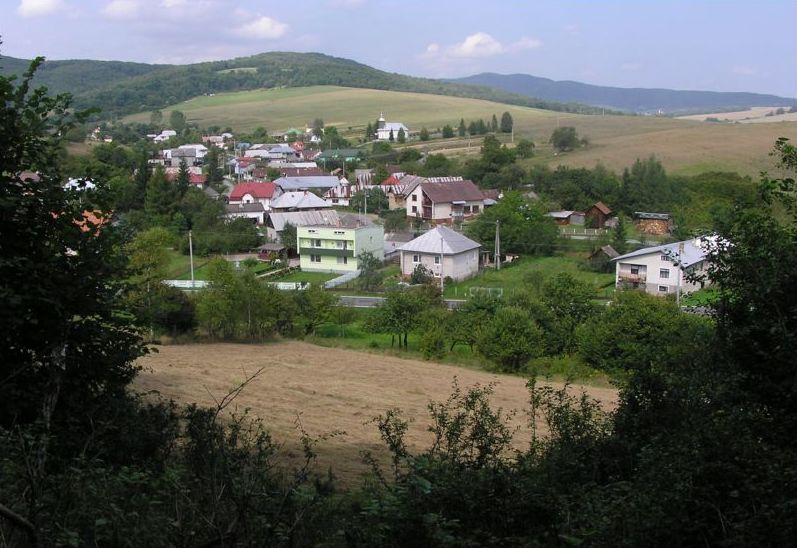

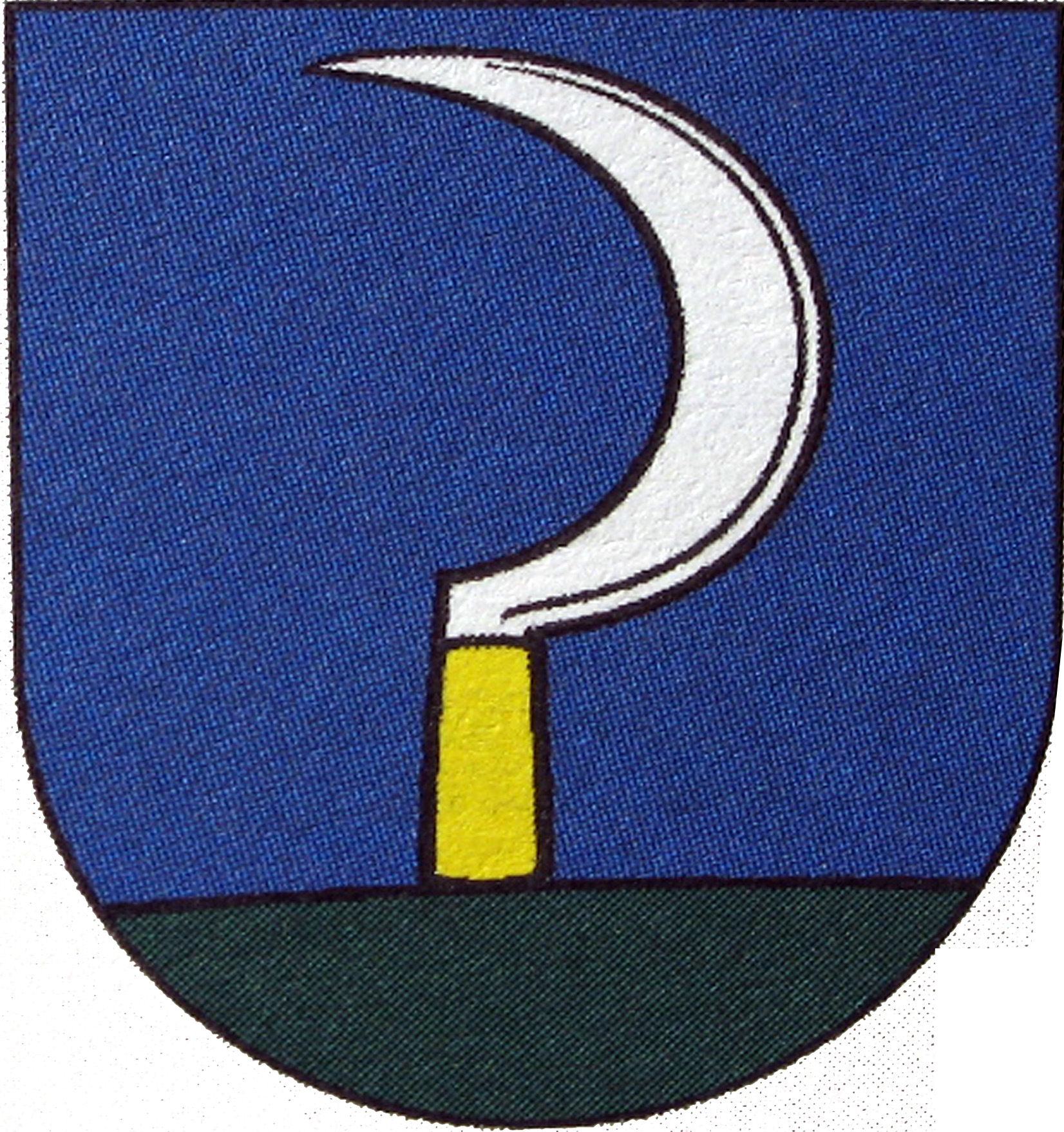
- Flag Coat of arms

- Location of Rakovčík in the Prešov Region Location of Rakovčík in Slovakia
- Coordinates: 49.25°N 21.58°E
- Country: Slovakia
- Region: Prešov Region
- District: Svidník District
- First mentioned: 1572

Area
  - Total: 4.66 km^{2} (1.80 sq mi)
- Elevation: 222 m (728 ft)

Population (2025)
  - Total: 140
- Time zone: UTC+1 (CET)
  - Summer (DST): UTC+2 (CEST)
- Postal code: 904 2
- Area code: +421 54
- Vehicle registration plate (until 2022): SK

Rakovčík (Hungarian: Felsőrákóc; Rusyn: Раківчік) is a village and municipality in Svidník District in the Prešov Region of north-eastern Slovakia.

== History ==
In historical records the village was first mentioned in 1572.

== Geography ==
The municipality lies at an altitude of 222 metres (728 ft) and covers an area of 4.66 km^{2} (1.80 sq mi) (2025).

== Population ==
Population statistic (10 years)
Year	1995	2005	2015	2025
Count	175	157	167	140
Difference		−10.28%	+6.36%	−16.16%

Population statistic
Year	2024	2025
Count	139	140
Difference		+0.71%

It has a population of 140 people (31 December 2025).

=== Ethnicity ===
Census 2021 (1+ %)
Ethnicity	Number	Fraction
Slovak	103	75.73%
Rusyn	67	49.26%
Total	136	

In year 2021 was 136 people by ethnicity 103 as Slovak, 67 as Rusyn, 1 as Czech, 1 as Ukrainian and 1 as Not found out.

Note on population: The difference values of population numbers in the table "Population statistic" and in the sections "Ethnicity" & "Religion" is caused by the use of various statistical methods.

=== Religion ===
Census 2021 (1+ %)
Religion	Number	Fraction
Greek Catholic Church	111	81.62%
Roman Catholic Church	16	11.76%
None	8	5.88%
Total	136	

In year 2021 was 136 people by religion 111 from Greek Catholic Church, 16 from Roman Catholic Church, 8 from None and 1 from Not found out.
