= Eldership of Spisz =

Territory of Poland (1412–1569)

Eldership of Spisz Starostwo spiskie (Polish) Spišské starostovstvo (Slovak) Zipser Starostei (German)
- Eldership of the Kingdom of Poland and Polish–Lithuanian Commonwealth
- Coat of arms

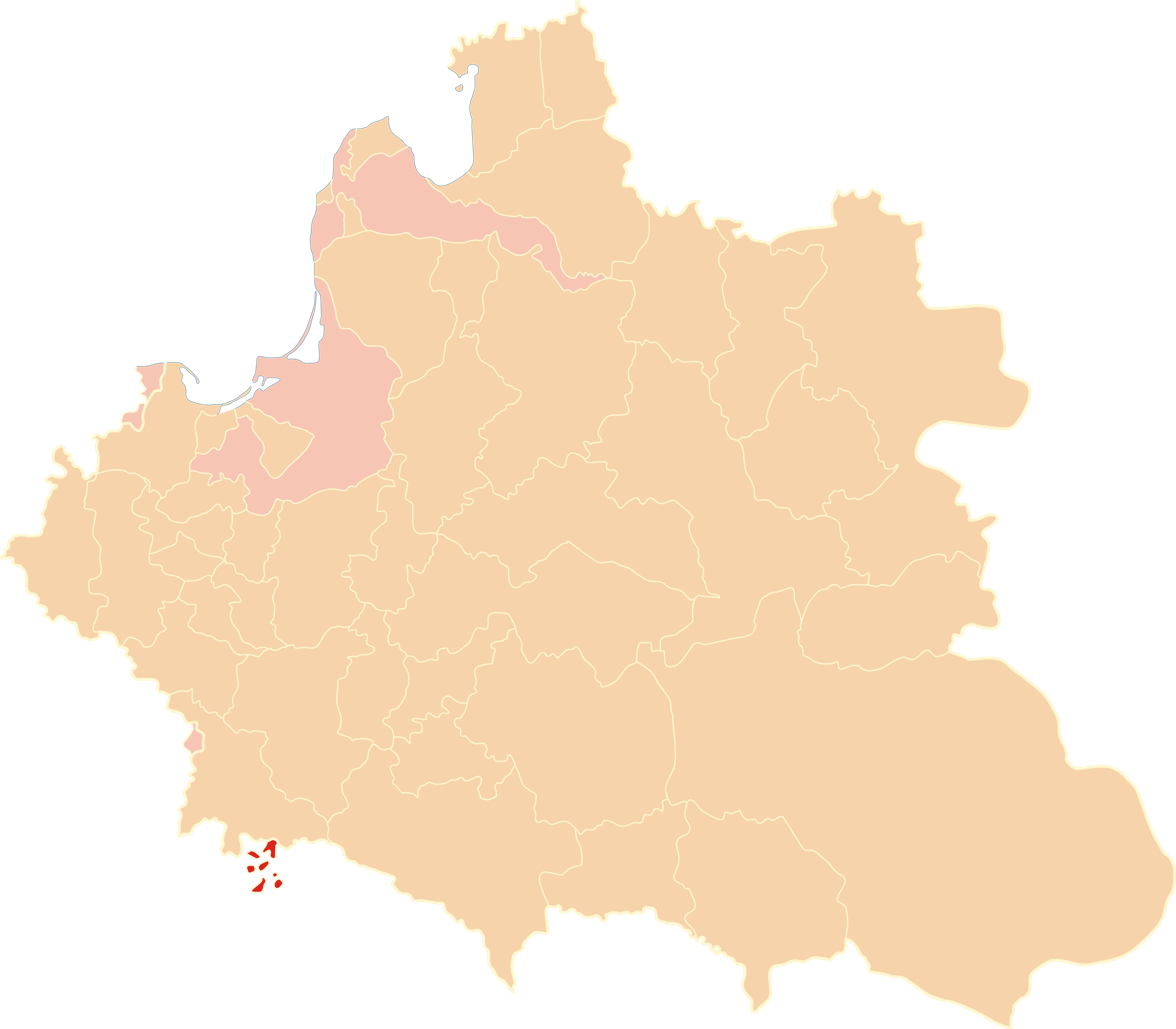
- Location of Eldership of Spisz in the Polish–Lithuanian Commonwealth in 1635
- Capital: Stará Ľubovňa
- History
  - Treaty of Lubowla: 8 November 1412
  - Court decision about Polish ownership: 1489
  - Formation of Polish–Lithuanian Commonwealth: 1 July 1569
  - Austrian occupation: 1769
  - Incorporation into Szepes County, Kingdom of Hungary.: 1772
- Contained within
  - Country: Kingdom of Poland (1412–1569); Polish–Lithuanian Commonwealth (1569–1772)
  - Union memberstate: Crown of the Kingdom of Poland (1569–1772)
  - Province: Lesser Poland (1569–1772)
- Political subdivisions: Dominion of Lubowla; Province of 13 Spisz Towns
Preceded by	Succeeded by
Szepes County	Szepes County
- Today part of: Slovakia, Poland

Eldership of Spisz (Note: Polish pronunciation: [ˈspiʂ]; Polish: Starostwo spiskie; Slovak: Spišské starostovstvo, Spišské starostvo; German: Zipser Starostei) was a non-castle eldership territory of Kingdom of Poland from 1412 to 1569 and Lesser Poland Province, Crown of the Kingdom of Poland, Polish–Lithuanian Commonwealth from 1569 to 1772. Its seat was located in the Stará Ľubovňa. It was located in the Spiš, and its area consisted of a salient connected to the rest of the Kingdom of Poland, and 5 exclaves.

It was formed on 8 November 1412, after the signing of Treaty of Lubowla between Władysław II Jagiełło, king of Poland and Sigismund, king of Hungary, in which the Kingdom of Hungary had pledges part of Szepes County to the Kingdom of Poland in exchange for 2 220 000 Prague groschen. The area was meant to remain in Poland until Hungary would pay the loan back, however, it was permanently incorporated as Polish possession in 1489 after Hungary had made a failed attempt to regain the area with military force. In 1569, after the formation of Polish–Lithuanian Commonwealth, it became a part of Lesser Poland Province, Crown of the Kingdom of Poland. The eldership was conquered by the Habsburg monarchy between 1769 and 1770 and remained under occupation until 1772 when it was formally incorporated into the Szepes County, Kingdom of Hungary.

== Subdivisions and borders ==
It was subdivided into the Dominion of Lubowla and Province of 13 Spisz Towns. Dominion of Lubowla consisted of the towns of Stará Ľubovňa, Podolínec and Hniezdne, and the souranding area. Its capital was Stará Ľubovňa. The dominion bordered the Kingdom of Poland to the north and Podoliniec District, Province of 13 Spisz Towns to the south. The Province of 13 Spisz Towns consisted of the towns of Spišská Nová Ves, Spišské Vlachy, Spišské Podhradie, Poprad, Veľká, Spišská Sobota, Stráže pod Tatrami, Matejovce, Spišská Belá, Vrbov, Ľubica, Ruskinovce, and Tvarožná, and 15 villages. It consisted of 6 separate parts, of which Podoliniec District bordered the Dominion of Lubowla, while 5 others were the exclaves surrounded by the Kingdom of Hungary. Additionally, Spiš Castle in Spišské Podhradie was an exclave of Hungary surrounded by the Eldership. The area of Eldership of Spisz was 1,100 km^{2} (420 sq mi).
