= Province of 13 Szepes Towns =

Subdivision of the Eldership of Spisz (1412–1778)

Province of 13 Spisz Towns
- Administrative division of Eldership of Spisz
- 1412–1778
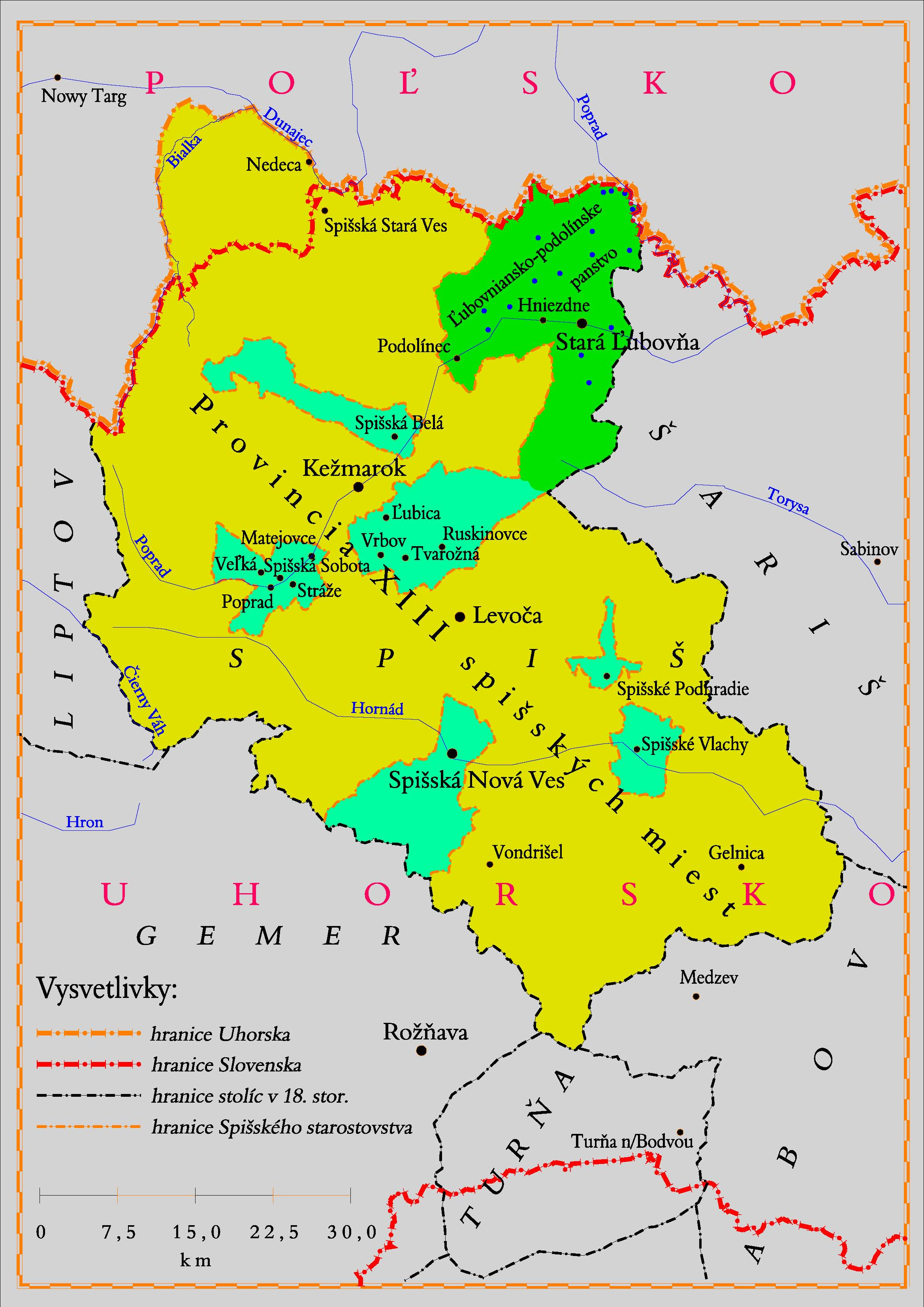
- Map of Spiš after the Spiš Pledge, including the Province of 13 Spisz Towns.
- History
  - Spiš Pledge and partition of the Province of 24 Szepes Towns: 8 November 1412
  - Formation of Polish–Lithuanian Commonwealth: 1 July 1569
  - Austrian occupation: 1769
  - Incorporation into Szepes County, Kingdom of Hungary: 1772
  - Incorporation into the Province of 16 Szepes Towns: 1778
- Contained within
  - Country: Kingdom of Poland (1412–1569); Polish–Lithuanian Commonwealth (1569–1772); Kingdom of Hungary (1772–1778)
  - Union memberstate: Crown of the Kingdom of Poland (1569–1772)
  - Province: Lesser Poland (1569–1772)
  - Eldership: Eldership of Spisz (1412–1772)
  - County: Szepes County (1772–1778)
- Political subdivisions: 5 districts
Preceded by	Succeeded by
Province of 24 Szepes Towns	Province of 16 Szepes Towns

The Province of 13 Szepes Towns (Note: Polish: Prowincja 13 miast spiskich; German: Provinz der 13 Zipser Städte; Slovak: Provincia 13 spišských miest; Hungarian: XIII. Szepesi Városok Provinciájába; Latin: Provincia XIII oppidorum terrae Scepusiensis) was an autonomous administrative division of the Eldership of Spisz, that until 1568 belonged to the Kingdom of Poland, and since then to the Crown of the Kingdom of Poland, Polish–Lithuanian Commonwealth. Since 1772, it belonged to the Szepes County, Kingdom of Hungary.

The province was formed on 8 November 1412, in with the Spiš Pledge, in which Hungary had pledged part of Szepes County to the Kingdom of Poland, with the Province of 24 Szepes Towns was divided into Province of 11 Szepes Towns in Hungary, and Province of 13 Spisz Towns in Poland. In 1569, after the formation of Polish–Lithuanian Commonwealth, it became a part of Lesser Poland Province, Crown of the Kingdom of Poland. The eldership was conquered by Habsburg monarchy between 1769 and 1770 and remained under occupation until 1772 when it was formally incorporated into the Szepes County, Kingdom of Hungary. After that, it existed as the seat until 1778, when it unified with the Dominion of Lubowla, forming the Province of 16 Szepes Towns.

== Subdivisions ==
The province had been formed from salient formed by Podoliniec District, that was connected to the rest of the Dominion of Lubowla, and via it to the rest of the Kingdom of Poland, and 5 exclaves surrounded by the Kingdom of Hungary. It was divided into 5 districts:

- Podoliniec District, with in seat exterritorially located in Podolínec, Dominion of Lubowla,
- Biała Spiska District, with the seat in Spišská Belá,
- Poprad District, with the seat in Poprad,
- Nowa Wieś Spiska District, with the seat in Spišská Nová Ves,
- Spiskie Podgrodzie District, with the seat in Spišské Podhradie, formed from the enclaves of areas of Spišské Podhradie and Spišské Vlachy.

== Towns ==
- Spišská Nová Ves
- Spišské Vlachy
- Spišské Podhradie
- Poprad
- Veľká
- Spišská Sobota
- Stráže pod Tatrami
- Matejovce
- Spišská Belá
- Vrbov
- Ľubica
- Ruskinovce
- Tvarožná
