= Province of 16 Szepes Towns =

- Seat of Szepes County
- 1778–1785; 1791–1876
- Capital: Spišská Nová Ves
- History
  - Unification of the Province of 13 Szepes Towns and Dominion of Lubowla: 5 June 1778
  - Disestablishment during the Josephine reforms: 1 November 1785
  - Reestablishment and the abolition of the Josephine reforms: October 1791
  - Transformation into the Government Commissariat: 1749
  - Formation of the Austria-Hungary: 30 March 1867
  - Disestablishment of the autonomy: 1876
- Contained within
  - Country: Kingdom of Hungary (1778–1785, 1791–1867); Austria-Hungary (1867–1876)
  - County: Szepes County
Preceded by	Succeeded by
Province of 13 Szepes Towns; Dominion of Lubowla	Szepes County

The Province of 16 Szepes Towns (Note: Hungarian: XVI. Szepesi Városok Provinciájába; German: Provinz der 16 Zipser Städte; Slovak: Provincia 16 spišských miest; Latin: Provincia XVI oppidorum terrae Scepusiensis) was a seat, an autonomous administrative division, within Szepes County, located in the Kingdom of Hungary, and later in Austria-Hungary. Its capital was Spišská Nová Ves.

It existed from 1778 to 1785, and from 1791 to 1876. It was established on 5 June 1778, with the unification of the Province of 13 Szepes Towns and the Dominion of Lubowla into one entity. The territory was disestablished on 1 November 1785, with its lands being directly administrated by Szepes County until October 1791, when it was reestablished. It existed until 1876, when it was again disestablished, being given under direct administration of Szepes County.

== History ==
On 5 June 1778, Maria Theresa, Queen of Hungary, had confirmed old privileges of the towns of the Province of 13 Szepes Towns, and re-established their autonomy. It was unified with the Dominion of Lubowla, forming the Province of 16 Szepes Towns, with Spišská Nová Ves as its capital.

The province was disestablished on 1 November 1785, in the effect of the Josephine reforms, done under the rule of Joseph II. The towns lost their autonomy and were given back under the direct administration of Szepes County. It was reestablished back in October 1791, after the reforms were abolished.

In 1849, the Provincial Count was appointed as the Government Commissioner, de jure, turning the province into the Government Commissariat of 16 Towns. It got disestablished in 1876, during the period of Bach's absolutism. The towns lost their autonomy and were given back under the direct administration of Szepes County.

== Towns ==
- Spišská Nová Ves
- Spišské Vlachy
- Spišské Podhradie
- Poprad
- Veľká
- Spišská Sobota
- Stráže pod Tatrami
- Matejovce
- Spišská Belá
- Vrbov
- Ľubica
- Ruskinovce
- Tvarožná
- Stará Ľubovňa
- Podolínec
- Hniezdne
