= Province of 24 Szepes Towns =

Hungarian polity

- Seat of Szepes County
- 1271–1412
- Capital: Levoča (before 1344)
- History
  - Granting of the privileges to local nobility by king Stephen V: 1271
  - Spiš Pledge and partition of the seat: 8 November 1412
- Contained within
  - Country: Kingdom of Hungary
  - County: Szepes County
Preceded by	Succeeded by
Szepes County	Province of 11 Szepes Towns; Province of 13 Spisz Towns

The Province of 24 Szepes Towns, (Note: German: Provinz der 24 Zipser Städte; Hungarian: XXIV. Szepesi Városok Provinciájába; Slovak: Provincia 24 spišských miest; Latin: Provincia XXIV oppidorum terrae Scepusiensis) also known as the Union of 24 Szepes Towns, (Note: German: Bund der 24 Zipser Städte) and until c. 1344 as the Community of Szepesian Saxons, (Note: Latin: Communitas Saxonum de Scepus) and the Province of Szepesian Saxons, (Note: Latin: Provincia Saxonum de Scepus) was a seat, an autonomous administrative division, within Szepes County, Kingdom of Hungary. It existed from 1271 to 1412. On 8 November 1412, with the Spiš Pledge, in which Hungary had pledged part of Szepes County to the Kingdom of Poland, with the province was divided into Province of 11 Szepes Towns in Hungary, and Province of 13 Spisz Towns in Poland.

== History ==
The autonomous region of the Province of Szepesian Saxons has been established in 1277, with Stephen V, King of Hungary, giving the privileges to the German population of the settlers in the area of Hornád and Poprad. In 1317, the privileges were once again confirmed and extended by King Charles I, because the Szepesian Germans had helped him to defeat the oligarchs of the Kingdom of Hungary in the battle of Rozgony in 1312. The territory was granted self-government privileges similar to those of the royal free towns. In 1317, the special territory included 43 settlements, including Lőcse (present-day Levoča) and Késmárk (present-day Kežmarok), which however withdrew before 1344. Originally Lőcse was the seat of the government of the province. From 1370 the 41 settlements of the territory subscribed to a uniform special Szepes law system. By 1344, the territory was reduced to 24 settlements and later its name was changed to Province of 24 Szepes Towns. The province was led by the Count (Graf) of Szepes elected by the town judges of the 24 towns. It existed until 1412, when, with the Spiš Pledge, in which Hungary had pledges part of Szepes County to the Kingdom of Poland, the province was divided into Province of 11 Szepes Towns in Hungary, and Province of 13 Spisz Towns in Poland.

== Towns ==
- Spišská Nová Ves
- Spišské Vlachy
- Spišské Podhradie
- Poprad
- Veľká
- Spišská Sobota
- Stráže pod Tatrami
- Matejovce
- Spišská Belá
- Vrbov
- Ľubica
- Ruskinovce
- Tvarožná, Kežmarok District
- Spišský Štvrtok
- Iliašovce
- Žakovce
- Hrabušice
- Kurimany
- Mlynica
- Veľký Slavkov
- Odorín
- Bystrany
- Vlkovce
- Kežmarok (before 1344)
- Levoča (before 1344)
