= Dominion of Lubowla =

Subdivision of the Eldership of Spisz (1412–1778)

- Administrative division of Eldership of Spisz
- 1412–1778
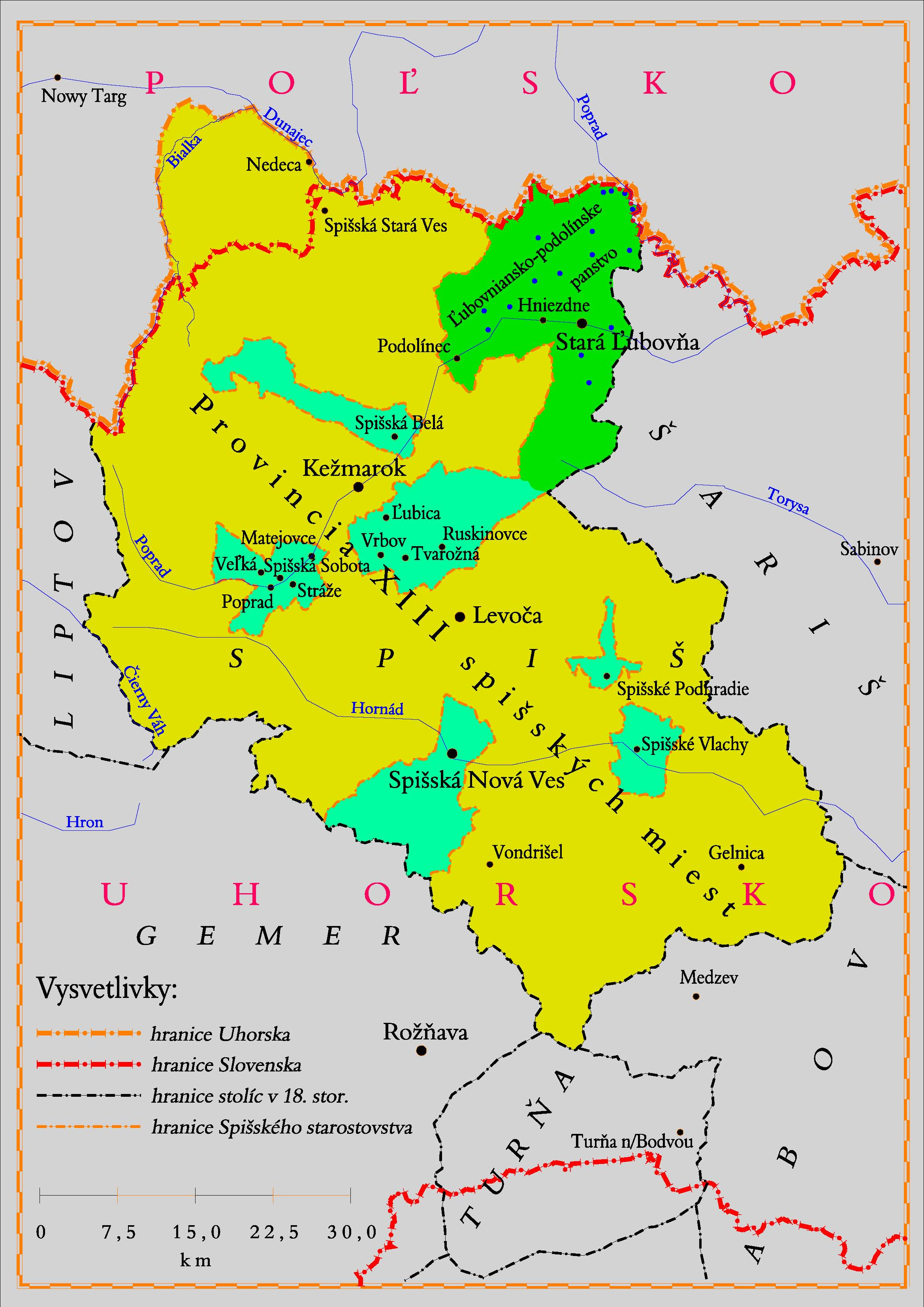
- Map of Spiš after the Spiš Pledge, including the Dominion of Lubowla.
- Capital: Stará Ľubovňa
- History
  - Spiš Pledge and partition of the Province of 24 Szepes Towns: 8 November 1412
  - Formation of Polish–Lithuanian Commonwealth: 1 July 1569
  - Austrian occupation: 1669
  - Incorporation into Szepes County, Kingdom of Hungary: 1772
  - Incorporation into the Province of 16 Szepes Towns: 1778
- Contained within
  - Country: Kingdom of Poland (1412–1569); Polish–Lithuanian Commonwealth (1569–1772); Kingdom of Hungary (1772–1778)
  - Union memberstate: Crown of the Kingdom of Poland (1569–1772)
  - Province: Lesser Poland (1569–1772)
  - Eldership: Eldership of Spisz (1412–1772)
  - County: Szepes County (1772–1778)
Preceded by	Succeeded by
Szepes County	Province of 16 Szepes Towns

The Dominion of Lubowla, (Note: Polish: dominium lubowlańskie) also known as the Dominion of Lubowla and Podoliniec, (Note: Polish: dominium lubowlańsko-podolinieckie; Slovak: Ľubovniansko-podolínske panstvo) was an administrative division of the Eldership of Spisz, that until 1568 belonged to the Kingdom of Poland, and from 1569 to 1772, to the Crown of the Kingdom of Poland, Polish–Lithuanian Commonwealth. Since 1772, it belonged to the Szepes County, Kingdom of Hungary. Its capital was Stará Ľubovňa, and other important towns were Podolínec and Hniezdne.

It was formed on 8 November 1412, during the Spiš Pledge, from the part of the Szepes County, that was pledged from the Kingdom of Hungary to the Kingdom of Poland. In 1569, after the formation of Polish–Lithuanian Commonwealth, it became a part of Lesser Poland Province, Crown of the Kingdom of Poland. The eldership got conquered by Habsburg monarchy between 1769 and 1770 and remained under occupation until 1772 when it was formally incorporated into the Szepes County, Kingdom of Hungary. After that, it existed as the seat until 1778, when it unified with the Province of 13 Spisz Towns, forming the Province of 16 Szepes Towns.
