= Province of 11 Szepes Towns =

European polity

- Seat of Szepes County
- 1412–1465
- Capital: Spišský Štvrtok
- History
  - Spiš Pledge and partition of the Province of 24 Szepes Towns: 8 November 1412
  - Dissolution of the autonomous region: 1465
- Contained within
  - Country: Kingdom of Hungary
  - County: Szepes County
| Preceded by | Succeeded by |
| Province of 24 Szepes Towns | Szepes County |

The Province of 11 Szepes Towns (Note: German: Provinz der 11 Zipser Städte; Hungarian: XI. Szepesi Városok Provinciájába; Slovak: Provincia 11 spišských miest; Latin: Provincia XI oppidorum terrae Scepusiensis) was a seat, an autonomous administrative division, within Szepes County, Kingdom of Hungary. It was established on 8 November 1412, with the Spiš Pledge, in which Hungary had pledged part of Szepes County to the Kingdom of Poland, with the Province of 24 Szepes Towns was divided into province of 11 Szepes Towns in Hungary, and Province of 13 Spisz Towns in Poland. It ceased to exist in 1465 when its autonomy was discontinued, with its territories being given back under the administration of Szepes County. Its seat was in Spišský Štvrtok.

== Towns ==
- Spišský Štvrtok
- Iliašovce
- Žakovce
- Hrabušice
- Kurimany
- Mlynica
- Veľký Slavkov
- Odorín
- Bystrany
- Vlkovce
- Harichovce
