= Szepes County =

County of the Kingdom of Hungary

Szepes County Comitatus Scepusiensis (Latin) Szepes vármegye (Hungarian) Komitat Zips (German) Spišská župa (Slovak)
- County of the Kingdom of Hungary
- 13th century–1920
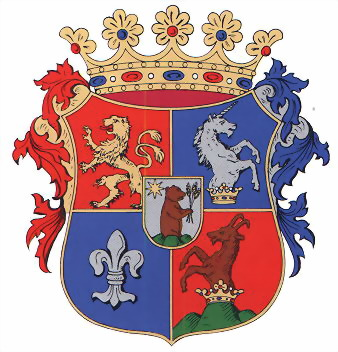
- Coat of arms

- Capital: Szepesi vár; Lőcse (16th century-1920)
- Area
  - Coordinates: 49°1′N 20°35′E
  - 1910: 3,654 km^{2} (1,411 sq mi)
- Population
  - 1910: 172,900
- History
  - Established: 13th century
  - Treaty of Trianon: 4 June 1920
- Today part of: Slovakia; Poland
- Spiš Castle; Levoča is the current name of the capital.

Szepes (Slovak: Spiš; Latin: Scepusium, Polish: Spisz, German: Zips) was an administrative county of the Kingdom of Hungary, called Scepusium before the late 19th century. Its territory today lies in northeastern Slovakia, with a very small area in southeastern Poland. For the current region, see Spiš.

== Geography ==
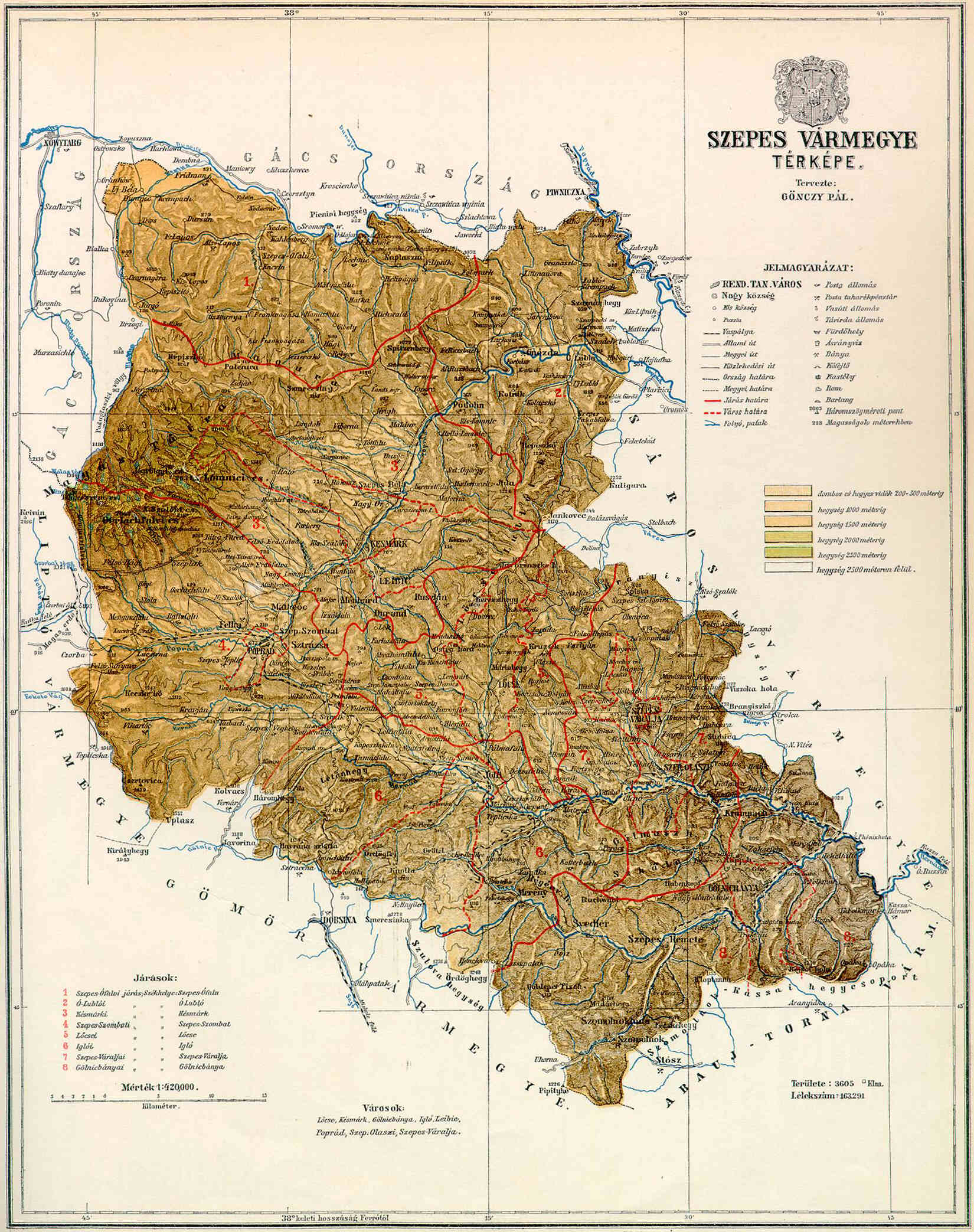
Map of Szepes, 1891.

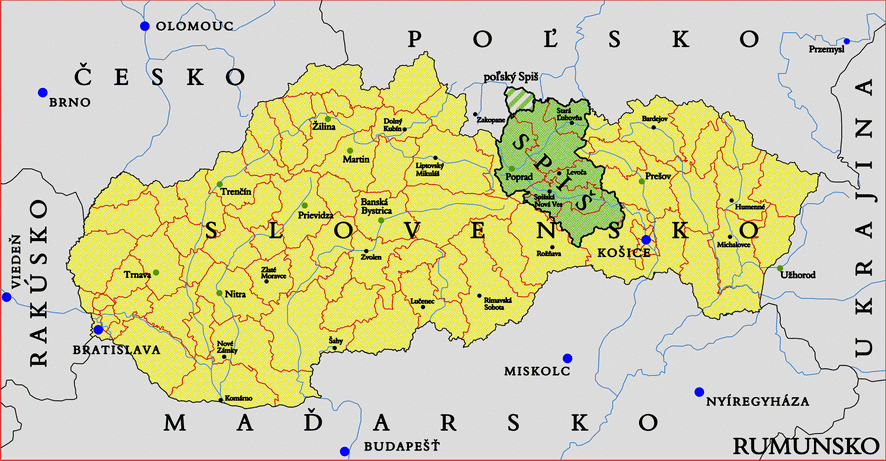
Former county of Szepes superimposed on map of contemporary Slovakia.

Szepes county shared borders with Poland and with the counties as follows: Liptó, Gömör-Kishont, Abaúj-Torna and Sáros. After the late 18th century dismemberment of Poland, the border was with the Austrian province of Galicia. Its area was 3,668 km^{2} in 1910. The county became part of Czechoslovakia, apart from a very small area now in Poland, after World War I, and is now part of Slovakia (and Poland).

=== Capitals ===
The original seat of government of Szepes county was Spiš Castle (Hungarian: Szepesi vár), which was constructed in the 12th century. Unofficially from the 14th century, and officially from the 16th century, until 1920 the capital of the county was Lőcse (present-day Levoča).

== History ==
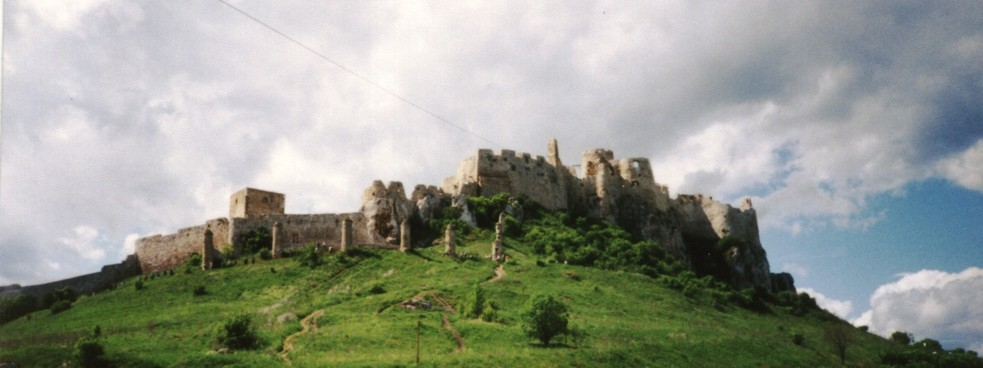
Spiš Castle (Szepesi vár)

This article only covers the history of Szepes when it was part of the Kingdom of Hungary (approx. 11th century – 1920). For a complete history of the region see Spiš.

=== Early history ===
The southern part of Szepes was conquered by the Kingdom of Hungary at the end of the 11th century, when the border of the Kingdom ended near Késmárk (present-day Kežmarok). The royal county of Szepes (comitatus Scepusiensis) was created in the second half of the 12th century. In the 1250s, the border of the Kingdom of Hungary shifted to the north to Podolin (present-day Podolínec) and in 1260 – in the northwest – to the Dunajec river. The northeastern region around Gnézda (present-day Hniezdne) and Ólubló (present-day Stará Ľubovňa) (the so-called "districtus Podoliensis") were incorporated only in the 1290s. The northern border of the county stabilized in the early 14th century. Around 1300, the royal county became a noble county.

The subsidiary of the Hungarian Chamber (the supreme Habsburg financial and economy institution in the Kingdom of Hungary) responsible for eastern territories (i.e. not only for Szepes) was called the Szepes Chamber (Zipser Kammer in German), and it existed from 1563 to 1848. Its seat was the town of Kassa (present-day Košice), sometimes Eperjes, (present-day Prešov).

==== Counts of Szepes ====
The rulers of the county were from the following Hungarian noble families:

- Zápolya (1464–1527)
- Thurzó (1531–1636)
- Csáky (1638–1848)

=== Seat of the 10 Lance-bearers ===
Until 1802, there was a Seat of the 10 Lance-bearers, an autonomous administrative division, which was situated to the east of Poprad in present-day southern Spiš, and whose origin is unknown. From the 12th century onwards, its inhabitants were known as the "guardians of the northern border." The territory of the county was populated by Germans, Hungarians and Slavs (Theotonicis, Hungaris et Sclavis). In 1802, when its inhabitants decided to merge the sedes with Szepes county, it included the following settlements: Ábrahámfalva/Abrahámovce, Betlenfalva/Betlanovce, Filefalva/Filice (today part of Gánovce), Hadusfalu/Hadušovce (today part of Spišské Tomášovce), Primfalu/Hôrka (including Kišovce, Svätý Ondrej, Primovce), Hozelecz/Hozelec, Jánócz/Jánovce (including Čenčice), Komarócz/Komárov, Lefkóc/Levkovce (today part of Vlková), and Mahálfalva/Machalovce (today part of Jánovce). Originally more villages were included.

The 'lance-bearers' were squires. The "sedes" was a collection of non-contiguous areas, which did not constitute a continuous territory. It had an autonomous government, similar to that of normal Hungarian counties, but was partly subordinated to the head of Szepes county. Until the 15th century, its capital was Csütörtökhely/Štvrtok/Donnersmark (present-day Spišský Štvrtok – which was not part of the sedes territories); following this there were various capitals, and after 1726 the capital was Betlenfalva/Betlensdorf (present-day Betlanovce).

=== Arrival of the Germans ===
Many of the towns of Szepes developed from German colonization of existing Slavic settlements. The German settlers had been invited to the territory from the mid-12th century onwards. The major immigration came following the devastating Mongol invasion of 1242, which turned Szepes, like other parts of the Kingdom of Hungary, into a largely depopulated area (some 50% of the population was lost). There was no significant Slavic population remaining and as it was a part of Hungary, King Béla IV of Hungary invited Germans to colonize the Szepes and other regions (covering parts of present-day Slovakia, present-day Hungary and Transylvania). The settlers were mostly traders and miners. The settlements founded by them in the southern parts (Szepesség) were mainly mining settlements (later towns). Consequently, until World War II, Spiš had a large German population (see Carpathian Germans). The last wave of Germans arrived in the 15th century.

In the early 13th century, the people of Szepes created their own religious organization called the "Brotherhood of the 24 royal parish priests", which received many privileges from the local provost. It was re-established after the Tatar invasion in 1248.

At the same time, the German settlements of the Hernád (present-day Hornád) and Poprád (present-day Poprad) basins created a special political territory with its own administration. They received collective privileges from King Stephen V in 1271, which were confirmed and extended by King Charles I in 1317, because the Szepesian Germans had helped him to defeat the oligarchs of the Kingdom of Hungary in the battle at Rozgony (present-day Rozhanovce) in 1312. The territory was granted self-government privileges similar to those of the royal free towns. In 1317, the special territory included 43 settlements, including Lőcse (present-day Levoča) and Késmárk (present-day Kežmarok), which however withdrew before 1344. From 1370 the 41 settlements of the territory subscribed to a uniform special Szepes law system (called Zipser Willkür in German). Initially, the special territory was called "Communitas (or Provincia) Saxonum de Scepus". By the mid-14th century, the territory was reduced to 24 settlements and later the name was changed to Province of 24 Szepes Towns. The province was led by the Count (Graf) of Szepes elected by the town judges of the 24 towns.

There was yet another privileged territory in Szepes. Until 1465, the privileged German mining towns in southern Szepes (e.g. Göllnitz/Gölnicbánya/Gelnica, Schwedler/Svedlér/Švedlár, Einseidel/Szepesremete/Mníšek nad Hnilcom, Helzmanowitz/Helcmanóc/Helcmanovce, Prakendorf/Prakfalva/Prakovce, Vagendrussel/Merény/Vondrišel (today called Nálepkovo), Jeckelsdorf/Jekelfalva/Jaklovce, Margetzan/Margitfalu/Margecany, Schmölnitz/Szomolnok/Smolník, Höfen/Szalánk/Slovinky, and Krompach/Korompa/Krompachy) were also exempt from the power of the Count of Szepes.

=== The pawning of Szepes towns and the Province of 13 Szepes Towns ===
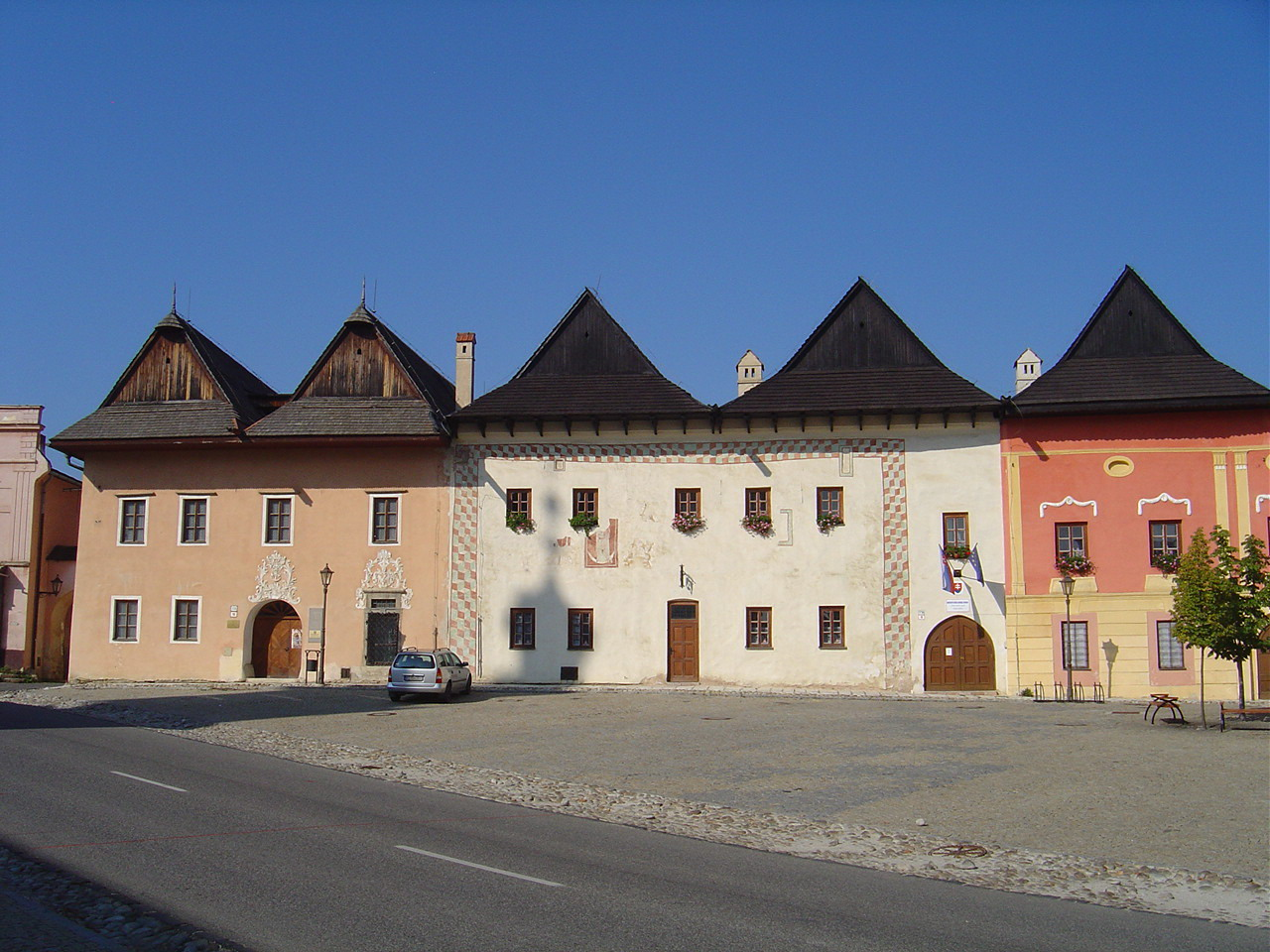
Medieval square in Spišská Sobota

The Province of 24 Szepes towns was dissolved in 1412, when, by the Treaty of Lubowla King Sigismund of Luxembourg, ruler of Hungary, pawned 13 of the towns of the former Province, as well as the territory around Ólubló (present-day Stará Ľubovňa) (i.e. the royal domain Lubló, plus Gnézda and Podolin, and several villages) to Poland, in exchange for the amount of 37,000 Czech sixty-groschen coins, that is, approximately 7 tonnes of pure silver. This was to finance his war against the Republic of Venice. The pledged towns were to be returned to the Kingdom of Hungary as soon as the loan was repaid; nobody expected the pledge would take 360 years to redeem (from 1412 to 1772).

From 1412 the pawned towns were officially known as the Province of 13 Szepes Towns (although it included also the three towns in the territory of Ólubló, making a total of 16 towns). It was led by a count elected each year by a council including representatives of the towns, past mayors, and the previous count. The 13 main pawned settlements did not form a continuous territory. They included: Leibic (present-day Ľubica), Poprád (present-day Poprad), Mateóc (Matejovce, today in Poprad), Szepesszombat (Spišská Sobota, today in Poprad), Strázsa (Stráže pod Tatrami, today in Poprad), Felka (Veľká, today in Poprad), Ruszkin (Ruskinovce, no longer in existence, located in the military training area Javorina near Kežmarok), Szepesbéla (present-day Spišská Belá), Igló (present-day Spišská Nová Ves), Szepesváralja (present-day Spišské Podhradie), Szepesolaszi (present-day Spišské Vlachy), Duránd (present-day Tvarožná), and Ménhárd (present-day Vrbov).

The towns kept their privileged status (now in fealty to the Polish kings who did not alter their privileges). The Polish king ceded his interest in the towns to Count Sebastian Lubomirski in 1593, whose family then became effectively the proprietors of the province.

The remaining 11 of the former 24 Szepes towns, which created the Province of 11 Szepes Towns in 1412, were not able to maintain their privileges. As early as 1465 they were fully incorporated into the Szepes county, i.e. they became subjects of the lords of the Spiš Castle. Some of them gradually turned into simple villages and lost their German privileges. Having privileges from both the Polish and the Hungarian crowns gave the "Province of 13" to significant commercial advantages over Lőcse (present-day Levoča) and other towns in the "Province of 11".

The pawned territories remained politically a part of the Kingdom of Hungary (and of its Esztergom diocese), while the revenue from the territories went to Poland. Poland also held some administrative powers in the area and was entitled to appoint a governor/administrator (starosta) for the territories, with his seat in Lubló, to manage them economically (especially to collect tax revenues) and to position guards at important road crossings even outside the pawned territories. One of the first Polish governors of Szepes was the famous knight Zawisza Czarny. Due to their complex political and economic status (German towns with Slovak subjects), the towns prospered economically.

Attempts of the Kingdom of Hungary to repay the debt (most notably in 1419, 1426, and 1439) failed and later the will (or ability) to pay declined. After alleged mistreatment of the towns – especially by Teodor Konstanty Lubomirski, Maria Josepha of Austria (queen consort of August III of Poland), and Count Heinrich Brühl – Maria Theresa of Austria decided to recover them by force. She took advantage of the Polish noble insurrections in the second half of the 18th century and occupied the towns in 1769 (with the apparent consent of the then Polish king Stanislaus II of Poland) without debt repayment. This act was confirmed by the First Partition of Poland in 1772. In 1773, the pawn was cancelled. In 1778, the 13 towns regained their privileges of 1271, the privileges were extended to the other three previously pawned towns, and this newly formed entity was named the Province of 16 Szepes Towns. The capital of the province was Igló, also known as Neudorf and later as Spišská Nová Ves. However, the privileges were gradually reduced and some 100 years later only religious and cultural rights remained. Finally, the province was dissolved altogether and incorporated into Szepes county in 1876.

=== 16th–19th centuries ===
The Szepes county (today mostly Spiš region) prospered not only from being situated on trade routes, but also from its natural resources of wood, agriculture and, until relatively recent times, mining. In the 15th century and later, iron, copper and silver were all exploited in the south of the region. Its relative wealth during this period, and its mixture of nationalities and religions, resulted in it becoming a major cultural centre – many schools were founded, and the town of Lőcse (present-day Levoča) became a major centre for printing in the 17th century. The buildings and churches of the region's towns, and the skills of schools such as those of the carver Master Paul of Levoča testify to this affluence and culture. Until the end of the 17th century, the area was often disrupted by wars, uprisings against the Habsburgs, and epidemics (a plague of 1710/1711 killed over 20,000). But from the 18th century onwards, relative stability enabled faster economic development. Many craft guilds were founded and by the end of the 18th century over 500 iron mines were operative in the south.

Such prosperity naturally meant that the churches paid great interest to the region. А Lutheran synod, the so-called Synod of Szepesváralja, took place in Szepesváralja (present-day Spišské Podhradie) in 1614. It discussed the Protestant organisation of the Szepes and Sáros counties. In the Catholic sphere, a separate Szepes Bishopric was created in 1776 with its seat at Szepeshely (present-day Spišská Kapitula).

The spirit of nationalism, growing in the 19th century, moved also in Spiš. In 1868, 21 settlements of Szepes sent their demands, the 'Szepes Petition', to the Diet of the Kingdom of Hungary, requesting special status for Slovaks within the Kingdom.

In 1871, the railway came to Szepes and this was to have profound consequences. On the one hand, it enabled economic and industrial expansion. On the other, it bypassed the old capital of the region, Lőcse (now Levoča), and favoured the growth of centres on its route, such as Poprád (now Poprad) and Igló (now Spišská Nová Ves).

In the aftermath of World War I, Szepes county became part of newly formed Czechoslovakia, as recognized by the concerned states in the 1920 Treaty of Trianon.

== Demographics ==
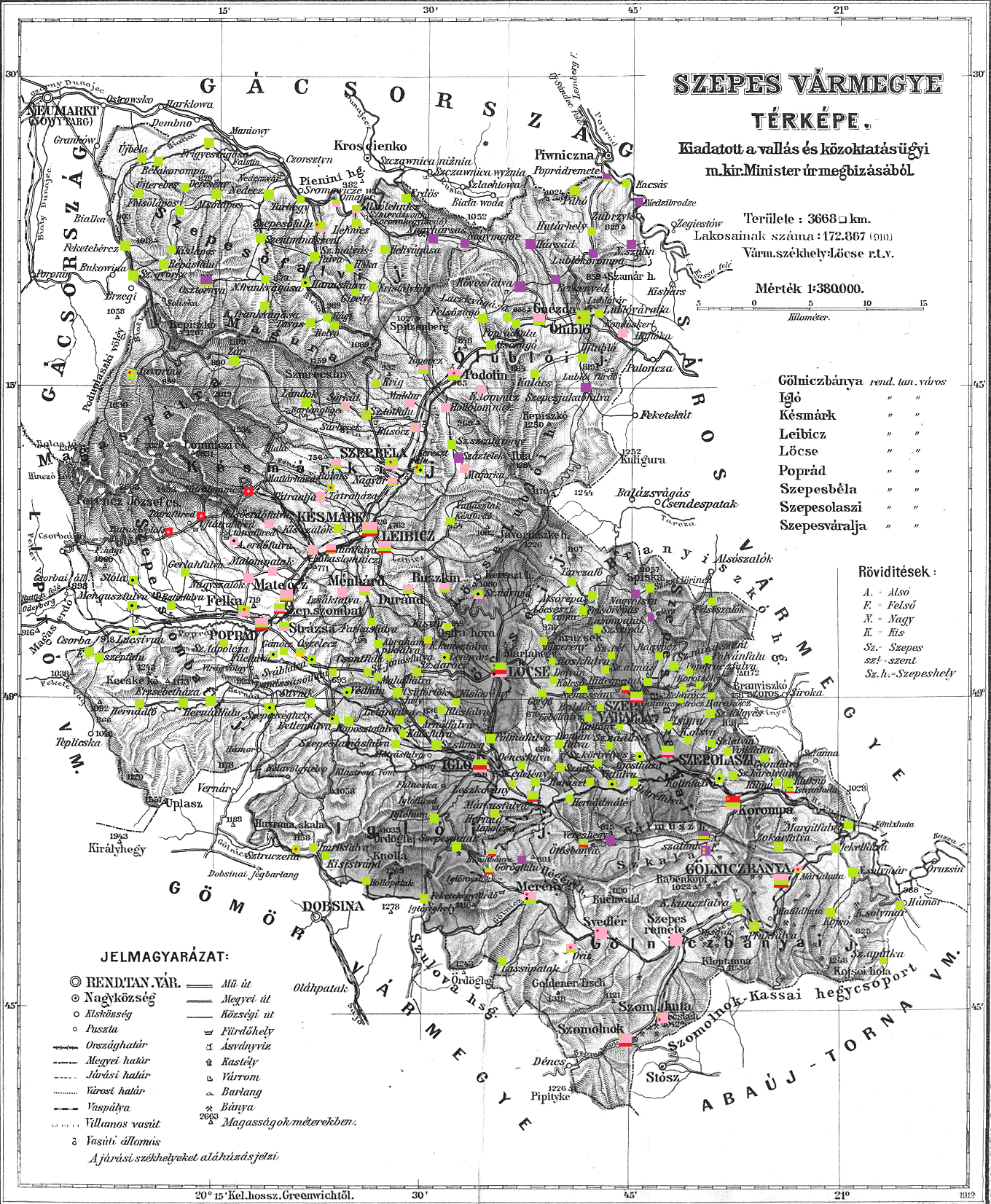
Ethnic map of the county with data of the 1910 census (see the key in the description).

Population by mother tongue (Note: Only linguistic communities > 1% are displayed.)
Census	Total	Slovak	German	Hungarian	Ruthenian	Other or unknown
1880	172,881	96,274 (57.99%)	48,169 (29.01%)	3,526 (2.12%)	16,158 (9.73%)	1,904 (1.15%)
1890	163,291	93,214 (57.08%)	44,958 (27.53%)	4,999 (3.06%)	17,518 (10.73%)	2,602 (1.59%)
1900	172,091	99,557 (57.85%)	42,885 (24.92%)	10,843 (6.30%)	14,333 (8.33%)	4,473 (2.60%)
1910	172,867	97,077 (56.16%)	38,434 (22.23%)	18,658 (10.79%)	12,327 (7.13%)	6,371 (3.69%)

Population by religion (Note: Only religious communities > 1% are displayed.)
Census	Total	Roman Catholic	Lutheran	Greek Catholic	Jewish	Other or unknown
1880	172,881	110,810 (64.10%)	33,101 (19.15%)	22,506 (13.02%)	5,941 (3.44%)	523 (0.30%)
1890	163,291	106,346 (65.13%)	28,923 (17.71%)	21,397 (13.10%)	6,095 (3.73%)	530 (0.32%)
1900	172,091	114,130 (66.32%)	27,655 (16.07%)	22,189 (12.89%)	7,234 (4.20%)	883 (0.51%)
1910	172,867	117,497 (67.97%)	26,459 (15.31%)	19,638 (11.36%)	7,475 (4.32%)	1,798 (1.04%)

=== Nationalities ===
According to censuses carried out in the Kingdom of Hungary in 1869 (and later in 1900 and 1910) the population of Szepes county comprised the following nationalities: Slovaks 50.4%, (58.2%, 58%), Germans 35% (25%, 25%), Ruthenians (Rusyns) 13.8% (8.4%, 8%) and 0.7% (6%, 6%) Magyars (Hungarians). The sudden increase in listed Hungarians after 1869 may be due to statistical interpretation (use of "most frequently used language" as criterion); it may also be attributable to assimilation, Magyarisation, most notably of the German minority. The figures do not make clear how Jews were categorised, but their numbers must have been substantial as many of the towns had synagogues (one survives in Spišské Podhradie) and Jewish cemeteries still survive in Kežmarok, Levoča and elsewhere.

Up until now, there is a significant population (about 40,000 to 48,000 estimated) of ethnic Poles (practically without any exception, the Gorals using Polish dialect of Szepes region). The Hungarian censuses ignored the Polish nationality, all ethnic Poles were registered as Slovaks. There was also a very strong process of Slovakization of Polish people throughout 18th–20th centuries, mostly done by Roman Catholic Church, in which institution the local aboriginal Polish priests were replaced with Slovak ones. Also the institution of schooling was replacing the Polish language with Slovak language during classes.

Up until the 12th century, there were no Hungarians (except the area of The Spis Castle and the Church of Saint Martin) in the region. The Slovak and German inhabitants came to Szepes in following centuries in a process of colonization the Carpathian wilds by Hungarian Crown. All localities were inhabited by Poles, as a result of a natural process of colonizing the lands along the rivers, going up-stream. In this case, the river was Poprád river (today Poprad) which flows into the Vistula and thus belongs to the drainage basin of the Baltic Sea (as opposed to nearby Hornad and Vah, and all other Slovak rivers; Poprad is the only river in contemporary Slovakia going north), and all colonists originated from Sądecczyzna and Podhale region of Southern Poland.

== Economy ==
Economic activity in the region was principally based on agriculture (and, in the mediaeval period, mining).

== Subdivisions ==
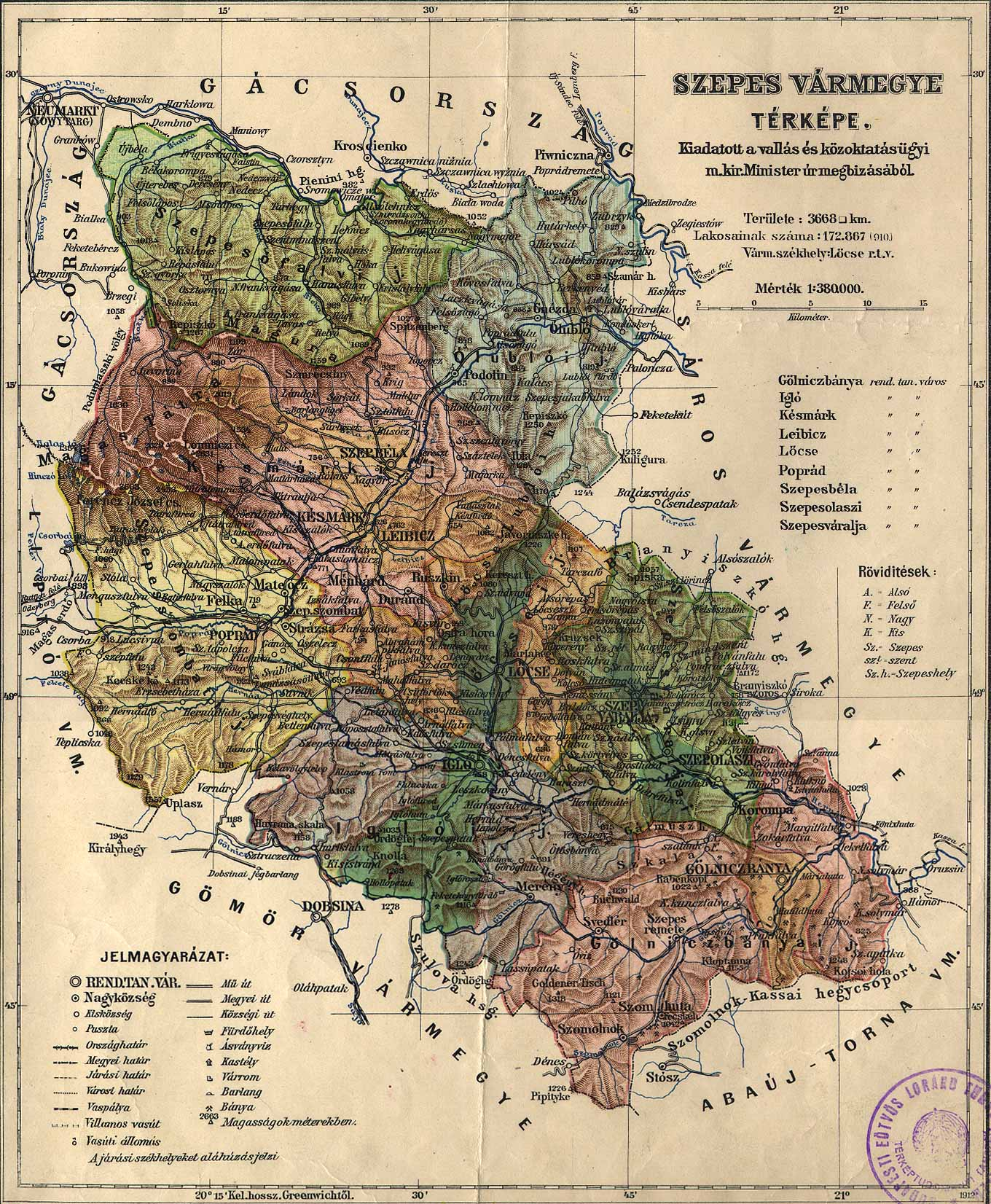

From the beginning of the 15th century, the county was subdivided into three processuses. The number was changed to four in 1798. In the second half of the 19th century, the number of processuses (districts) was increased.

In the early 20th century, the subdivisions of the county Szepes were (town names first in Hungarian, then in Slovak, then in German):

Districts (járás)
District	Capital
Gölnicbánya	Gölnicbánya (now Gelnica)
Igló	Igló (now Spišská Nová Ves)
Késmárk	Késmárk (now Kežmarok)
Lőcse	Lőcse (now Levoča)
Ólubló	Ólubló (now Stará Ľubovňa)
Szepesófalu	Szepesófalu (now Spišská Stará Ves)
Szepesszombat	Szepesszombat (now Spišská Sobota)
Szepesváralja	Szepesváralja (now Spišské Podhradie)
Urban districts (rendezett tanácsú város)
Gölnicbánya (now Gelnica)
Igló (now Spišská Nová Ves)
Késmárk (now Kežmarok)
Leibic (now Ľubica)
Lőcse (now Levoča)
Poprád (now Poprad)
Szepesbéla (now Spišská Belá)
Szepesolaszi (now Spišské Vlachy)
Szepesváralja (now Spišské Podhradie)

== See also ==
- List of administrative divisions of the Kingdom of Hungary

== Sources ==
- Krempaská, Zuzanna, Sixteen Scepus Towns from 1412 to 1876, Spišska Nova Vés: Spiš Museum. ISBN 9788085173062
