= Odorín =

Village and municipality the Košice Region of central-eastern Slovakia

- Municipality
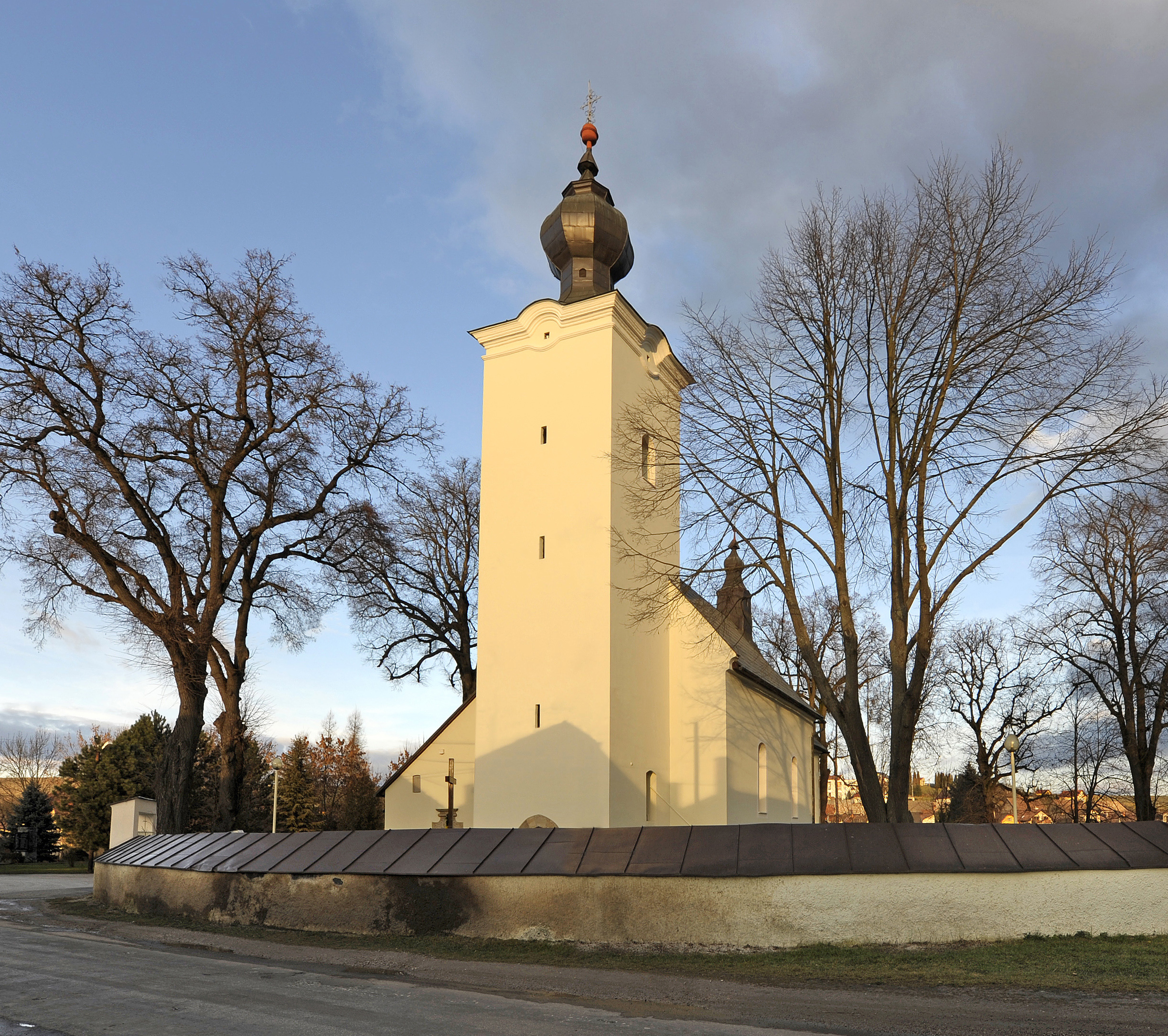

- Flag

- Location of Odorín in the Košice Region Location of Odorín in Slovakia
- Coordinates: 48.93°N 20.63°E
- Country: Slovakia
- Region: Košice Region
- District: Spišská Nová Ves District
- First mentioned: 1263

Area
  - Total: 9.13 km^{2} (3.53 sq mi)
- Elevation: 439 m (1,440 ft)

Population (2025)
  - Total: 1,017
- Time zone: UTC+1 (CET)
  - Summer (DST): UTC+2 (CEST)
- Postal code: 532 2
- Area code: +421 53
- Vehicle registration plate (until 2022): SN
- Website: www.obecodorin.sk

Odorín (Hungarian: Szepesedelény) is a village and municipality in the Spišská Nová Ves District in the Košice Region of central-eastern Slovakia.

== History ==
In historical records the village was first mentioned in 1263.

== Geography ==
The municipality lies at an altitude of 439 metres (1,440 ft) and covers an area of 9.13 km^{2} (3.53 sq mi) (2025).

== Population ==
Population statistic (10 years)
| Year | 1995 | 2005 | 2015 | 2025 |
|---|---|---|---|---|
| Count | 835 | 904 | 949 | 1017 |
| Difference | | +8.26% | +4.97% | +7.16% |

Population statistic
| Year | 2024 | 2025 |
|---|---|---|
| Count | 1013 | 1017 |
| Difference | | +0.39% |

It has a population of 1017 people (31 December 2025).

=== Ethnicity ===
Census 2021 (1+ %)
| Ethnicity | Number | Fraction |
|---|---|---|
| Slovak | 989 | 98.4% |
| Not found out | 11 | 1.09% |
| Total | 1005 | |

In year 2021 was 1005 people by ethnicity 989 as Slovak, 11 as Not found out, 7 as Rusyn, 4 as Ukrainian, 3 as Czech, 3 as Polish, 2 as Italian, 1 as Irish, 1 as Serbian, 1 as German and 1 as Other.

Note on population: The difference values of population numbers in the table "Population statistic" and in the sections "Ethnicity" & "Religion" is caused by the use of various statistical methods.

=== Religion ===
Census 2021 (1+ %)
| Religion | Number | Fraction |
|---|---|---|
| Roman Catholic Church | 845 | 84.08% |
| None | 95 | 9.45% |
| Greek Catholic Church | 32 | 3.18% |
| Not found out | 11 | 1.09% |
| Total | 1005 | |

In year 2021 was 1005 people by religion 845 from Roman Catholic Church, 95 from None, 32 from Greek Catholic Church, 11 from Not found out, 6 from Eastern Orthodox Church, 6 from Evangelical Church, 3 from Christian Congregations in Slovakia, 3 from Ad hoc movements, 2 from Other and not ascertained christian church, 1 from Jewish community and 1 from Paganism and natural spirituality.
