= Iliašovce =

Village and municipality in Slovakia

Iliašovce Illésfalva
- Municipality
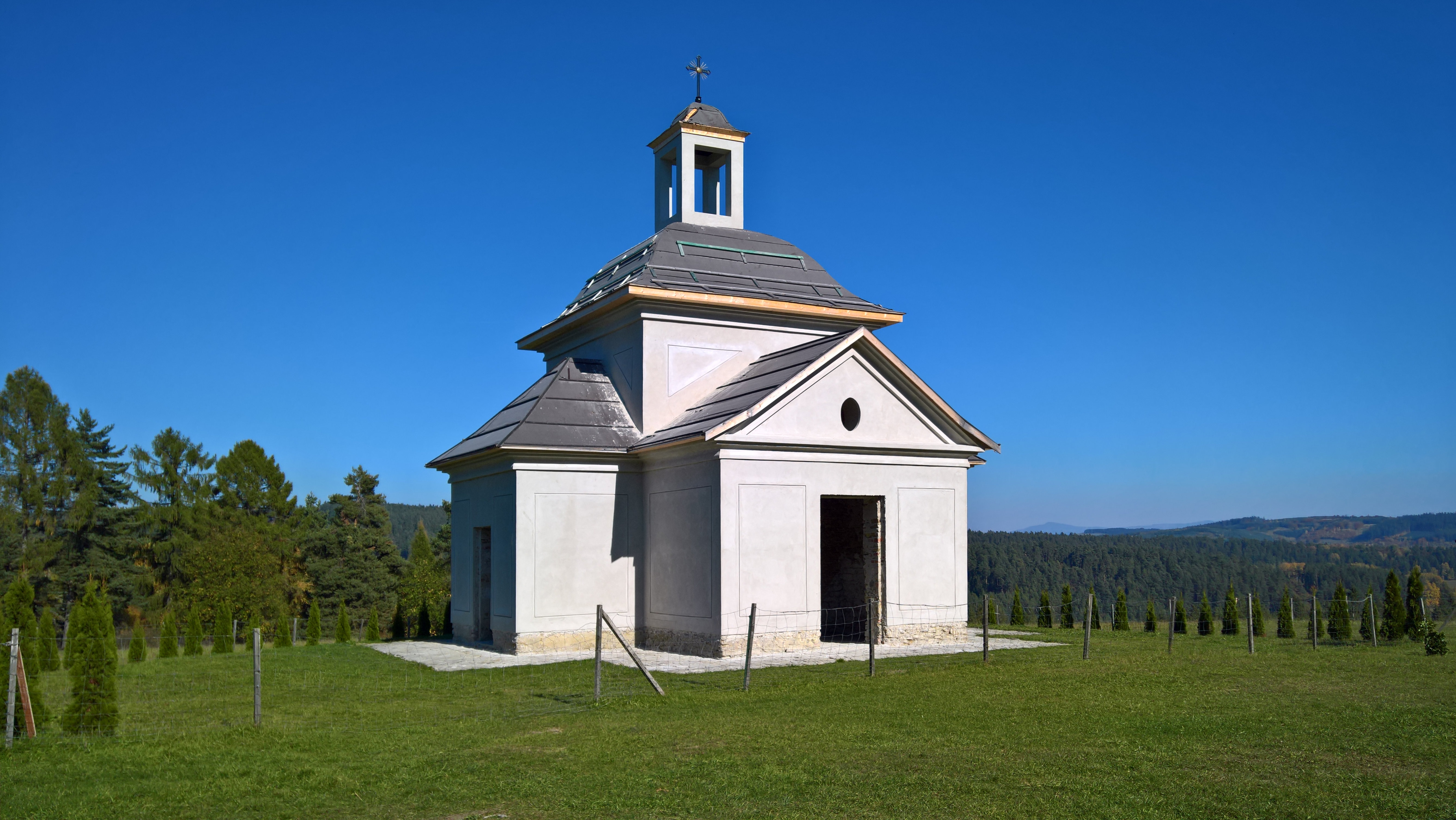

- Flag

- Location of Iliašovce in the Košice Region Location of Iliašovce in Slovakia
- Coordinates: 48.98°N 20.53°E
- Country: Slovakia
- Region: Košice Region
- District: Spišská Nová Ves District
- First mentioned: 1263

Area
  - Total: 13.49 km^{2} (5.21 sq mi)
- Elevation: 522 m (1,713 ft)

Population (2025)
  - Total: 999
- Time zone: UTC+1 (CET)
  - Summer (DST): UTC+2 (CEST)
- Postal code: 531 1
- Area code: +421 53
- Vehicle registration plate (until 2022): SN
- Website: www.iliasovce.sk

Iliašovce (Hungarian: Illésfalva) is a village and municipality in the Spišská Nová Ves District in the Košice Region of central-eastern Slovakia.

== History ==
In historical records the village was first mentioned in 1263.

== Geography ==
The municipality lies at an altitude of 522 metres (1,713 ft) and covers an area of 13.49 km^{2} (5.21 sq mi) (2025).

== Population ==
Population statistic (10 years)
Year	1995	2005	2015	2025
Count	934	960	973	999
Difference		+2.78%	+1.35%	+2.67%

Population statistic
Year	2024	2025
Count	1011	999
Difference		−1.18%

It has a population of 999 people (31 December 2025).

=== Ethnicity ===
Census 2021 (1+ %)
Ethnicity	Number	Fraction
Slovak	930	92.44%
Romani	61	6.06%
Not found out	52	5.16%
Total	1006	

In year 2021 was 1006 people by ethnicity 930 as Slovak, 61 as Romani, 52 as Not found out, 3 as Other, 2 as Czech and 1 as Rusyn.

Note on population: The difference values of population numbers in the table "Population statistic" and in the sections "Ethnicity" & "Religion" is caused by the use of various statistical methods.

=== Religion ===
Census 2021 (1+ %)
Religion	Number	Fraction
Roman Catholic Church	597	59.34%
Evangelical Church	227	22.56%
None	86	8.55%
Not found out	59	5.86%
Greek Catholic Church	19	1.89%
Total	1006	

In year 2021 was 1006 people by religion 597 from Roman Catholic Church, 227 from Evangelical Church, 86 from None, 59 from Not found out, 19 from Greek Catholic Church, 5 from Christian Congregations in Slovakia, 4 from Seventh-day Adventist Church, 2 from Apostolic Church, 1 from Calvinist Church, 1 from Eastern Orthodox Church, 1 from Other and not ascertained christian church, 1 from Other, 1 from Church of the Brethren, 1 from Baptists Church and 1 from Ad hoc movements.

== Genealogical resources ==
The records for genealogical research are available at the state archive "Statny Archiv in Levoca, Slovakia"

- Roman Catholic church records (births/marriages/deaths): 1744-1896 (parish B)

== See also ==
- List of municipalities and towns in Slovakia
