= Austrian occupation of Spiš and Podhale =

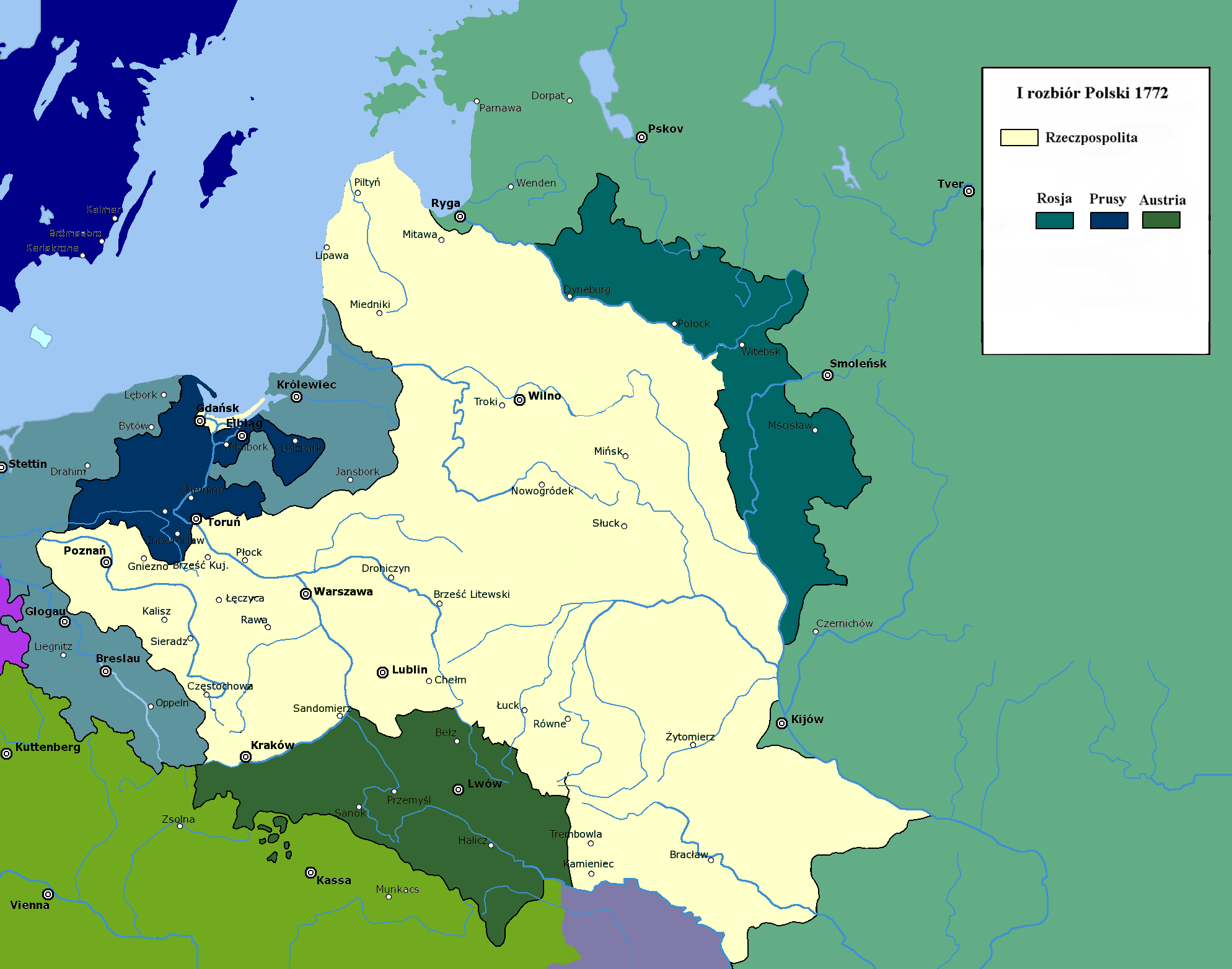
First Partition of Poland in 1772.

Austrian occupation of Spiš and Podhale – the Austrian occupation of the Spiš lien from 1769 until 1772, when the occupied territory was formally annexed by the Habsburg Empire, part of the First Partition of Poland. Prior to the annexation, the territory was part of Poland proper, as part of the Crown of the Kingdom of Poland.

The occupation was originally implemented under pretext of the need for the Habsburg Empire to upkeep the sanitary cordon, as to protect the Kingdom of Hungary from an outbreak of the plague. Between 1770 and until 1772, the starostwa of Nowy Targ, Czorsztyn and Stary Sącz were also under Austrian occupation.
