= Hniezdne =

- Municipality
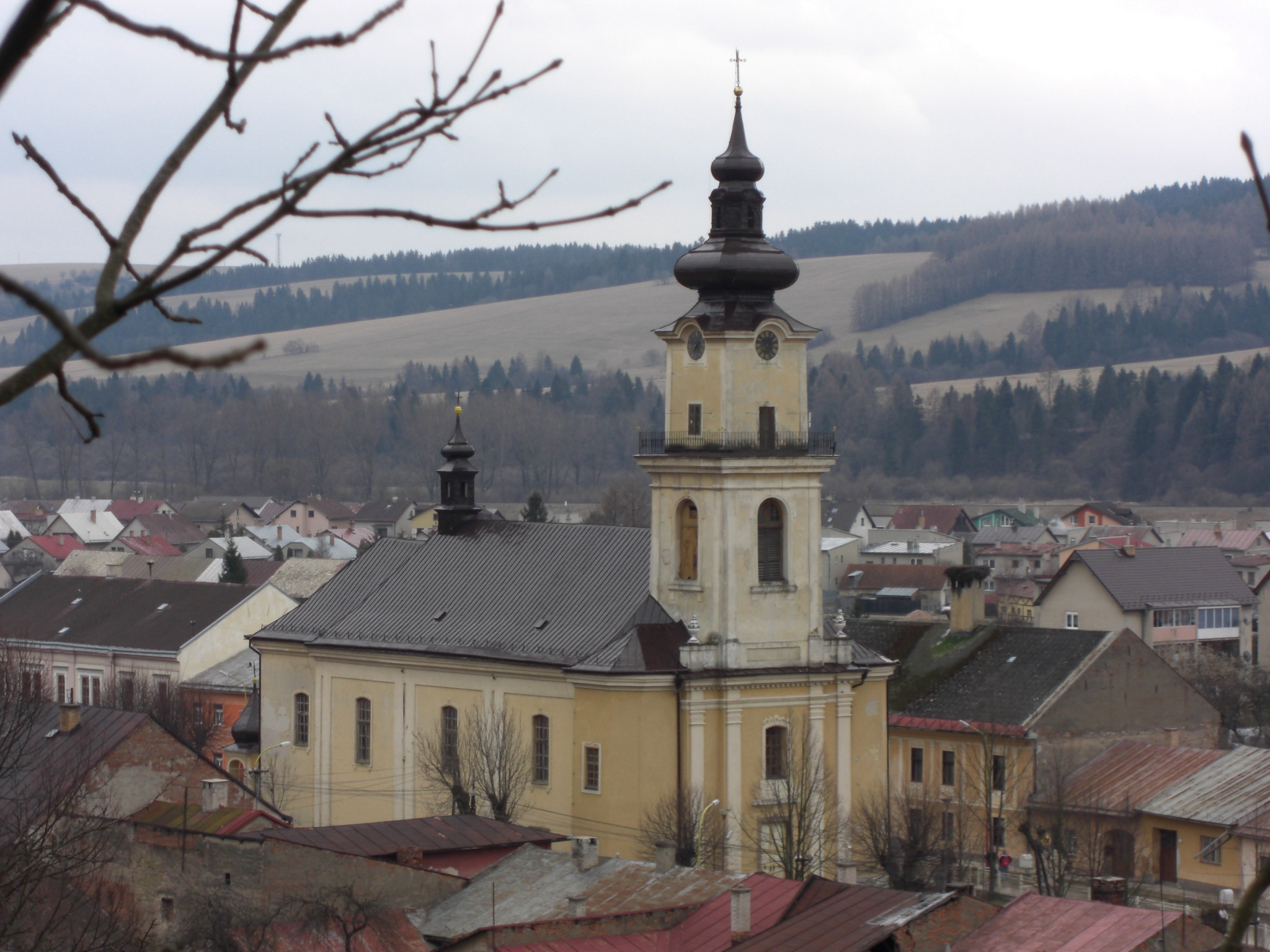

- Flag

- Location of Hniezdne in the Prešov Region Location of Hniezdne in Slovakia
- Coordinates: 49.30°N 20.63°E
- Country: Slovakia
- Region: Prešov Region
- District: Stará Ľubovňa District
- First mentioned: 1286

Area
  - Total: 18.06 km^{2} (6.97 sq mi)
- Elevation: 534 m (1,752 ft)

Population (2025)
  - Total: 1,393
- Time zone: UTC+1 (CET)
  - Summer (DST): UTC+2 (CEST)
- Postal code: 650 1
- Area code: +421 52
- Vehicle registration plate (until 2022): SL
- Website: www.hniezdne.sk

Hniezdne (German: Kniesen; Hungarian: Gnézda, Rusyn: Гнїздне) is a village and municipality in Stará Ľubovňa District in the Prešov Region of northern Slovakia.

== Etymology ==
The name is derived from Slavic gnězdo - a nest (modern Polish: gniazdo, modern Slovak: hniezdo; after the replacement of initial Proto-Slavic g > h), but the first mention is of German origin Knysen (1286). The Slovak name before 1948 was Gňazdá. The town belonged to a German language island. The German population was expelled in 1945.

== History ==
In historical records the village was first mentioned in 1286. Before the establishment of independent Czechoslovakia in 1918, Hniezdne was part of Szepes County within the Kingdom of Hungary. From 1939 to 1945, it was part of the Slovak Republic. On 24 January 1945, the Red Army dislodged the Wehrmacht from Hniezdne and it was once again part of Czechoslovakia.

== Geography ==
The municipality lies at an altitude of 534 metres (1,752 ft) and covers an area of 18.06 km^{2} (6.97 sq mi) (2025).

== Population ==
Population statistic (10 years)
Year	1995	2005	2015	2025
Count	1367	1411	1427	1393
Difference		+3.21%	+1.13%	−2.38%

Population statistic
Year	2024	2025
Count	1401	1393
Difference		−0.57%

It has a population of 1393 people (31 December 2025).

=== Ethnicity ===
Census 2021 (1+ %)
Ethnicity	Number	Fraction
Slovak	1365	95.58%
Romani	108	7.56%
Not found out	46	3.22%
Rusyn	31	2.17%
German	25	1.75%
Total	1428	

In year 2021 was 1428 people by ethnicity 1365 as Slovak, 108 as Romani, 46 as Not found out, 31 as Rusyn, 25 as German, 10 as Czech, 6 as Ukrainian, 5 as Polish, 3 as Other, 2 as English, 1 as Russian and 1 as Croatian.

Note on population: The difference values of population numbers in the table "Population statistic" and in the sections "Ethnicity" & "Religion" is caused by the use of various statistical methods.

=== Religion ===
Census 2021 (1+ %)
Religion	Number	Fraction
Roman Catholic Church	1258	88.1%
Greek Catholic Church	85	5.95%
None	40	2.8%
Not found out	23	1.61%
Total	1428	

In year 2021 was 1428 people by religion 1258 from Roman Catholic Church, 85 from Greek Catholic Church, 40 from None, 23 from Not found out, 8 from Eastern Orthodox Church, 8 from Evangelical Church, 2 from Ad hoc movements, 1 from Old Catholic Church, 1 from Jehovah's Witnesses, 1 from Christian Congregations in Slovakia and 1 from United Methodist Church.

According to the 2011 census, Hniezdne had 1,463 inhabitants, 91.46% declared Slovak nationality, 4.92% Romani, 0.82% German, 0.48% Rusyn, 0.48% Czech, 0.34% Ukrainian, 0.14% Polish, 0.07% Hungarian and 0.07% Croatian. 1.23% did not declare any nationality.

== Genealogical resources ==
The records for genealogical research are available at the state archive "Statny Archiv in Levoca, Slovakia"

- Roman Catholic church records (births/marriages/deaths): 1624-1945 (parish A)

== See also ==
- List of municipalities and towns in Slovakia
