= Podolínec =

- Municipality
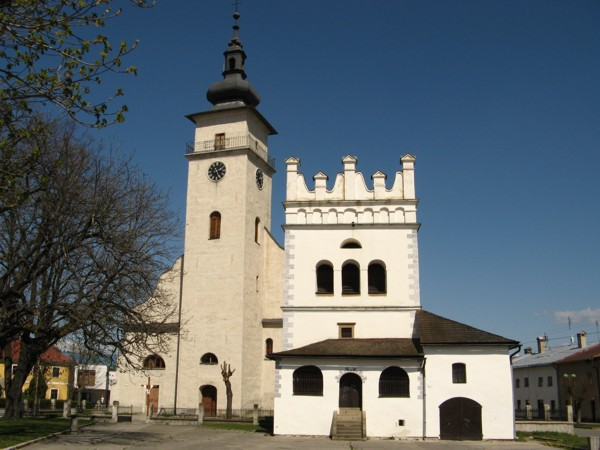
- A church in Podolínec

- Flag Coat of arms

- Location of Podolínec in the Prešov Region Location of Podolínec in Slovakia
- Coordinates: 49.26°N 20.53°E
- Country: Slovakia
- Region: Prešov Region
- District: Stará Ľubovňa District
- First mentioned: 1244

Government
  - Mayor: Michal Marhefka

Area
  - Total: 33.18 km^{2} (12.81 sq mi)
- Elevation: 565 m (1,854 ft)

Population (2025)
  - Total: 3,024
- Time zone: UTC+1 (CET)
  - Summer (DST): UTC+2 (CEST)
- Postal code: 650 3
- Area code: +421 52
- Vehicle registration plate (until 2022): SL
- Website: www.podolinec.eu

Podolínec (Polish: Podoliniec, Rusyn: Подолинець, German: Pudlein, Hungarian: Podolin) is a town in the Stará Ľubovňa District of the Prešov Region in northern Slovakia, in the historic region of Spiš.

== Etymology ==
The etymology is straightforward, the name means in Slovak "place between the hills".

== History ==
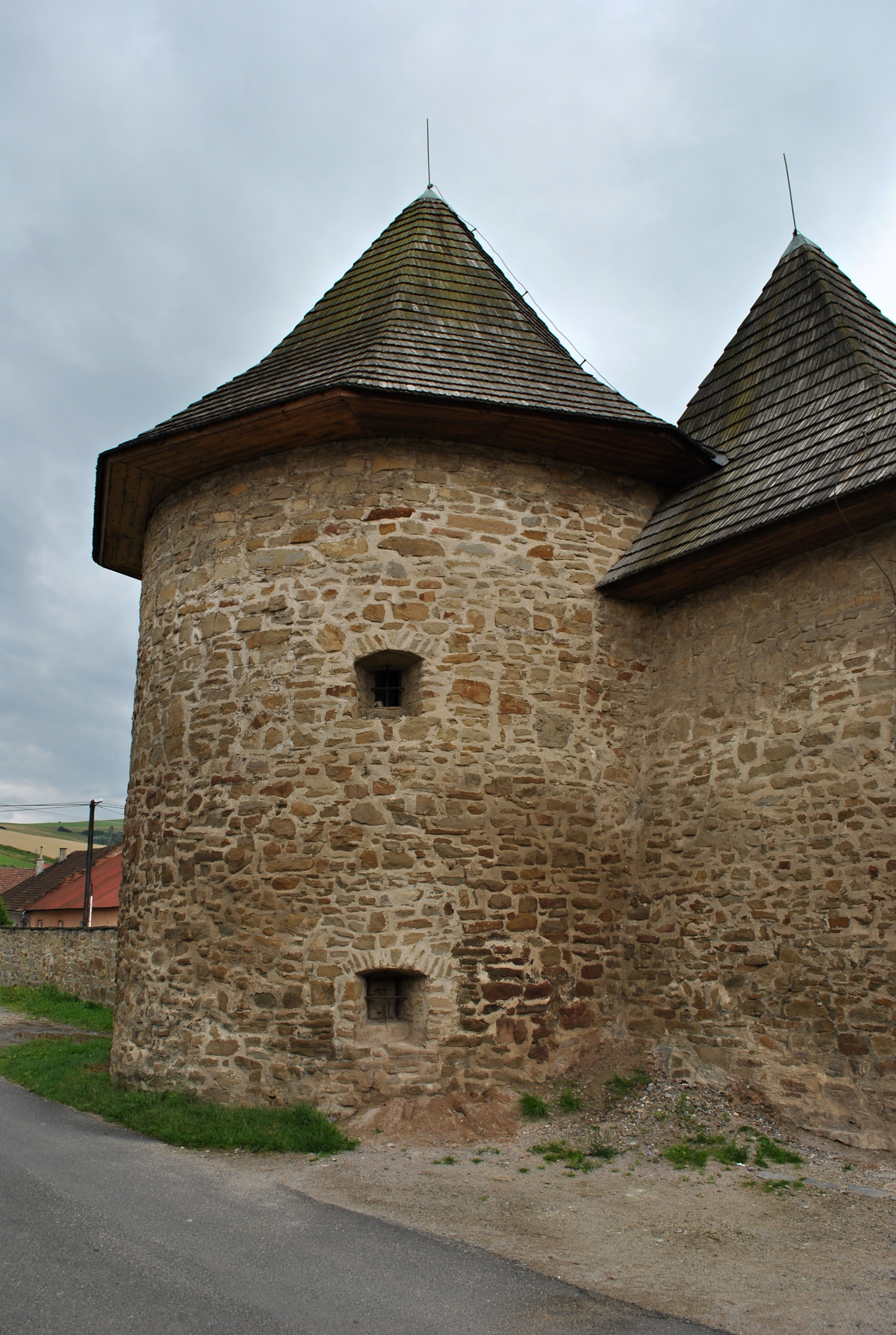
Tower within the medieval town walls

The first written record of Podolínec, as part of Polish-ruled Sącz Land, dates from 1236 and is included in the Kraków Bishop complaint to the Pope regarding the Hungarian clergy, illegally collecting taxes from the local church, which belonged to the Diocese of Kraków. In 1244 Bolesław V the Chaste, the Duke of Sandomierz-Kraków land granted a location permit to a knight from Kraków, called Henryk. His wife, Kinga, built a small fortification near the village, and granted it to Clarisses of Stary Sącz. In 1292 the place was given town rights for welcoming German settlers from Silesia, from which on the town was called Pudlein. It was the first of the Spisz towns obtaining the staple right. Around 1400, local shoemakers founded the region's first guild order.

Later in the second half of the 14th century, the town passed in the reign of Hungary. In 1343, King Louis I of Hungary promoted Podolínec to the status of a free royal town. In 1412 it was granted back to Poland as a result of the Treaty of Lubowla and it remained Polish until 1772. Podolínec was at that time a walled town with its own castle. It was the only town in the Spiš region to resist the Hussite raids. There was a Piarists' Collegium, founded by the starosta of Spisz, Stanisław Lubomirski. The most famous ward of the Collegium was Stanisław Konarski who joined the Piarist Order in 1715. Following the First Partition of Poland in 1772, the grant was cancelled in 1773 and the town was re-incorporated into the Kingdom of Hungary three years later. It was part of the "Province of 16 Spiš towns" in the 18th and 19th centuries, but its privileges were gradually reduced and in the end it was incorporated into Szepes County. The industrial revolution bypassed Podolínec and the railway came to the town only in 1893, when some small industrial production developed.

Before the establishment of independent Czechoslovakia in 1918, Podolínec was part of Szepes County within the Kingdom of Hungary. From 1939 to 1945, it was part of the Slovak Republic. On 25 January 1945, the Red Army dislodged the Wehrmacht from Podolínec and it was once again part of Czechoslovakia.

The city was part of the German language island of the Oberzips until the end of World War II, when the German population was expelled according to the Beneš decrees.

== Geography ==
The municipality lies at an altitude of 565 metres (1,854 ft) and covers an area of 33.18 km^{2} (12.81 sq mi) (2025).

The town lies near the Poprad River, in the Spiš region, near the Spišská Magura range. It is located approximately 15 km (9.32 mi) from Stará Ľubovňa and 35 km (21.75 mi) from Poprad.

== Population ==
Historical population
Year	Pop.	±%
1970	2,259	—
1980	2,624	+16.2%
1991	2,908	+10.8%
2001	3,173	+9.1%
2011	3,257	+2.6%
2021	3,108	−4.6%
Source: Censuses

Population statistic (10 years)
Year	1995	2005	2015	2025
Count	3145	3204	3190	3024
Difference		+1.87%	−0.43%	−5.20%

Population statistic
Year	2024	2025
Count	3048	3024
Difference		−0.78%

It has a population of 3024 people (31 December 2025).

=== Ethnicity ===
Census 2021 (1+%)
Ethnicity	Number	Fraction
Slovak	2847	91.6%
Not found out	236	7.59%
Romani	130	4.18%
Rusyn	42	1.35%
Total	3108	

In year 2021 was 3108 people by ethnicity 2847 as Slovak, 236 as Not found out, 130 as Romani, 42 as Rusyn, 7 as Polish, 6 as Czech, 5 as Vietnamese, 3 as German, 3 as Other, 2 as Ukrainian, 2 as Moravian, 2 as Hungarian, 2 as English, 1 as Turkish, 1 as Russian and 1 as Greek.

Note on population: The difference values of population numbers in the table "Population statistic" and in the sections "Ethnicity" & "Religion" is caused by the use of various statistical methods.

=== Religion ===
Census 2021 (1+%)
Religion	Number	Fraction
Roman Catholic Church	2471	79.5%
Not found out	248	7.98%
None	204	6.56%
Greek Catholic Church	98	3.15%
Evangelical Church	49	1.58%
Total	3108	

In year 2021 was 3108 people by religion 2471 from Roman Catholic Church, 248 from Not found out, 204 from None, 98 from Greek Catholic Church, 49 from Evangelical Church, 10 from Christian Congregations in Slovakia, 10 from Ad hoc movements, 4 from Eastern Orthodox Church, 3 from Old Catholic Church, 3 from Other, 3 from Buddhism, 2 from Calvinist Church, 2 from Hinduism and 1 from Jehovah's Witnesses.

== Partner Town ==
- Rytro, Poland

== Bibliography ==
- Skłodowski, Jan (2019). Zapomniane uczelnie Rzeczypospolitej [Forgotten Educational Institutions of the Commonwealth] (in Polish). Warsaw: Narodowy Instytut Polskiego Dziedzictwa Kulturowego za Granicą POLONIKA. ISBN 978-83-66172-02-9.
