= Ľubica =

- Municipality
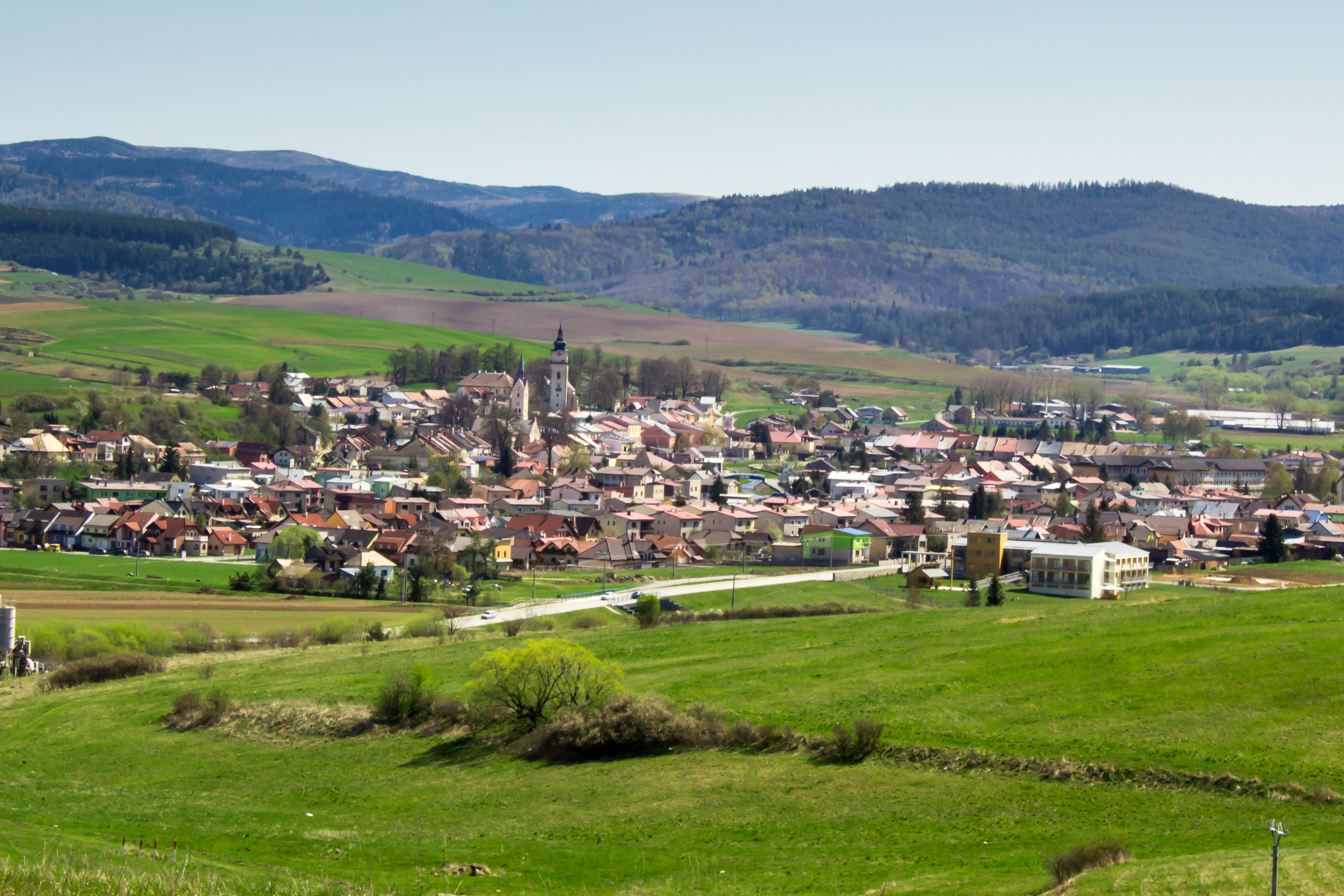

- Flag

- Location of Ľubica in the Prešov Region Location of Ľubica in Slovakia
- Coordinates: 49.24°N 20.45°E
- Country: Slovakia
- Region: Prešov Region
- District: Kežmarok District
- First mentioned: 1271

Area
  - Total: 26.42 km^{2} (10.20 sq mi)
- Elevation: 629 m (2,064 ft)

Population (2025)
  - Total: 4,517
- Time zone: UTC+1 (CET)
  - Summer (DST): UTC+2 (CEST)
- Postal code: 597 1
- Area code: +421 52
- Vehicle registration plate (until 2022): KK
- Website: www.obeclubica.sk

Ľubica (Hungarian: Leibic, German: Leibitz, Rusyn: Любіца) is a large village and municipality in Kežmarok District in the Prešov Region of north Slovakia. It is now a mostly housing development district with many panel block houses.

== History ==
In historical records the village was first mentioned in 1271. Before the establishment of independent Czechoslovakia in 1918, Ľubica was part of Szepes County within the Kingdom of Hungary. From 1939 to 1945, it was part of the Slovak Republic. On 27 January 1945, the Red Army dislodged the Wehrmacht from Ľubica in the course of the Western Carpathian offensive and it was once again part of Czechoslovakia.

Martin Luther's Ninety-Five Theses were first read publicly in Ľubica in 1521 by Thomas Preisner.

== Geography ==
The municipality lies at an altitude of 629 metres (2,064 ft) and covers an area of 26.42 km^{2} (10.20 sq mi) (2025).

== Population ==
Population statistic (10 years)
Year	1995	2005	2015	2025
Count	3554	3979	4439	4517
Difference		+11.95%	+11.56%	+1.75%

Population statistic
Year	2024	2025
Count	4482	4517
Difference		+0.78%

It has a population of 4517 people (31 December 2025).

=== Ethnicity ===
Census 2021 (1+ %)
Ethnicity	Number	Fraction
Slovak	4318	96.47%
Romani	577	12.89%
Not found out	116	2.59%
Total	4476	

In year 2021 was 4476 people by ethnicity 4318 as Slovak, 577 as Romani, 116 as Not found out, 44 as Rusyn, 42 as Czech, 12 as German, 11 as Polish, 6 as Italian, 6 as Other, 5 as Hungarian, 3 as Russian, 2 as Ukrainian, 1 as Moravian and 1 as Canadian.

Note on population: The difference values of population numbers in the table "Population statistic" and in the sections "Ethnicity" & "Religion" is caused by the use of various statistical methods.

=== Religion ===
Census 2021 (1+ %)
Religion	Number	Fraction
Roman Catholic Church	3535	78.98%
None	350	7.82%
Greek Catholic Church	266	5.94%
Not found out	123	2.75%
Evangelical Church	90	2.01%
Total	4476	

In year 2021 was 4476 people by religion 3535 from Roman Catholic Church, 350 from None, 266 from Greek Catholic Church, 123 from Not found out, 90 from Evangelical Church, 41 from Eastern Orthodox Church, 40 from Christian Congregations in Slovakia, 8 from Other and not ascertained christian church, 7 from Ad hoc movements, 3 from Calvinist Church, 3 from Jehovah's Witnesses, 3 from Other, 2 from Buddhism, 1 from Jewish community, 1 from Old Catholic Church, 1 from Paganism and natural spirituality, 1 from United Methodist Church and 1 from Seventh-day Adventist Church.
