= Vrbov =

- Municipality
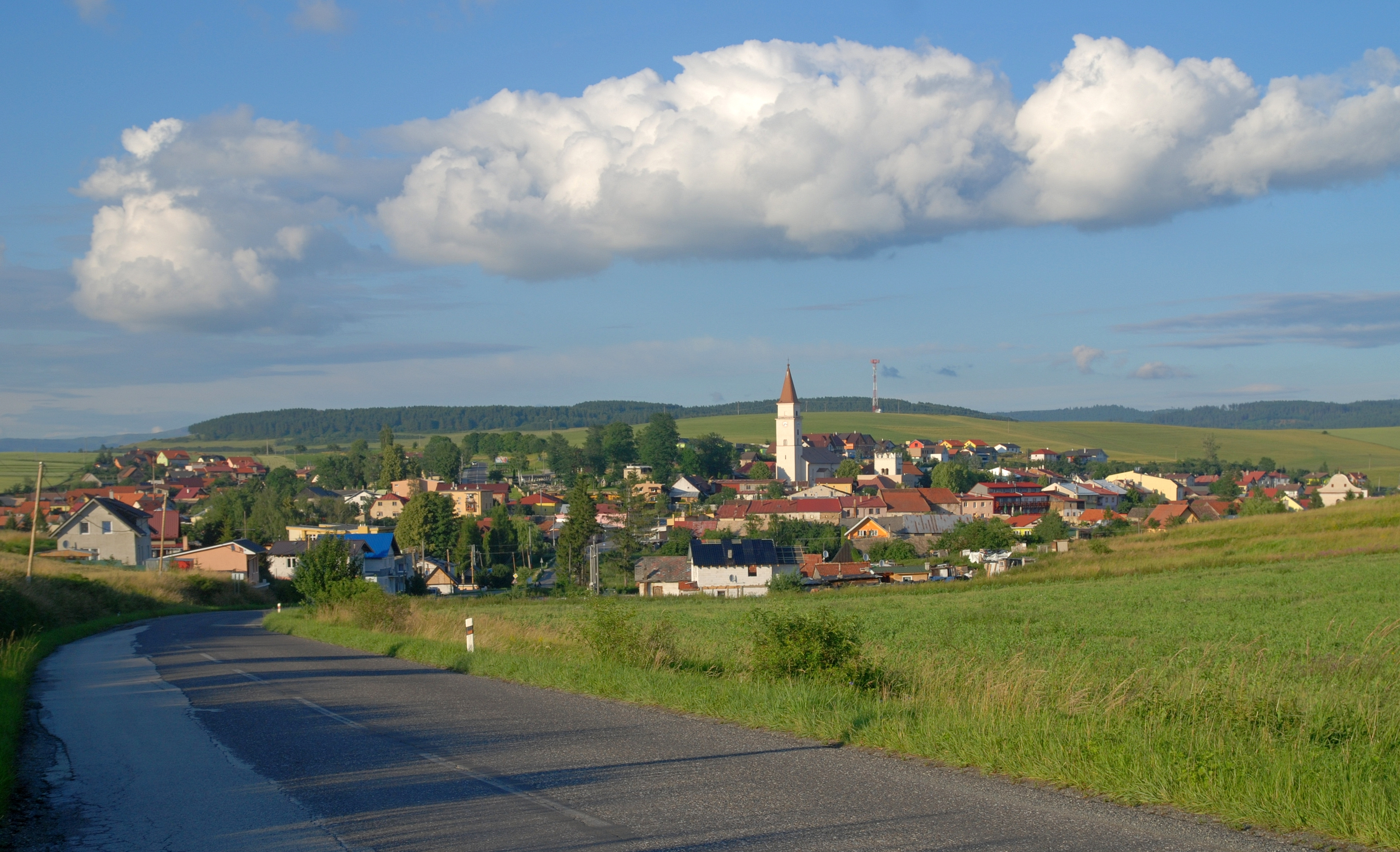

- Flag

- Location of Vrbov in the Prešov Region Location of Vrbov in Slovakia
- Coordinates: 49.08°N 20.43°E
- Country: Slovakia
- Region: Prešov Region
- District: Kežmarok District
- First mentioned: 1251

Area
  - Total: 19.30 km^{2} (7.45 sq mi)
- Elevation: 654 m (2,146 ft)

Population (2025)
  - Total: 1,524
- Time zone: UTC+1 (CET)
  - Summer (DST): UTC+2 (CEST)
- Postal code: 597 2
- Area code: +421 52
- Vehicle registration plate (until 2022): KK
- Website: www.obecvrbov.sk

Vrbov (German: Menhardsdorf, Hungarian: Ménhárd, Rusyn: Врбов) is a village and municipality in the Kežmarok District in the Prešov Region of Slovakia.

== Geography ==
The municipality lies at an altitude of 654 metres (2,146 ft) and covers an area of 19.30 km^{2} (7.45 sq mi) (2025).

== History ==
The first surviving mention was in a charter from 1251, when the Slavic village of Werbew was noted in a description of boundaries. In 1268, the German village "villa Menhardi" was noted. The two villages merged around 1271 and the resulting small town had a German character till 1945 when the German population was expelled. Before the establishment of independent Czechoslovakia in 1918, Vrbov was part of Szepes County within the Kingdom of Hungary. From 1939 to 1945, it was part of the Slovak Republic. On 27 January 1945, the Red Army dislodged the Wehrmacht from Vrbov in the course of the Western Carpathian offensive and it was once again part of Czechoslovakia.

== Population ==
Population statistic (10 years)
Year	1995	2005	2015	2025
Count	1172	1270	1472	1524
Difference		+8.36%	+15.90%	+3.53%

Population statistic
Year	2024	2025
Count	1525	1524
Difference		−0.06%

It has a population of 1524 people (31 December 2025).

=== Ethnicity ===
Census 2021 (1+ %)
Ethnicity	Number	Fraction
Slovak	1476	96.21%
Romani	245	15.97%
Not found out	41	2.67%
Total	1534	

In year 2021 was 1534 people by ethnicity 1476 as Slovak, 245 as Romani, 41 as Not found out, 5 as German, 4 as Polish, 4 as Hungarian, 3 as Czech, 2 as Ukrainian, 1 as Italian, 1 as Rusyn, 1 as Russian, 1 as Other and 1 as English.

Note on population: The difference values of population numbers in the table "Population statistic" and in the sections "Ethnicity" & "Religion" is caused by the use of various statistical methods.

=== Religion ===
Census 2021 (1+ %)
Religion	Number	Fraction
Roman Catholic Church	1385	90.29%
None	66	4.3%
Greek Catholic Church	25	1.63%
Not found out	19	1.24%
Evangelical Church	18	1.17%
Total	1534	

In year 2021 was 1534 people by religion 1385 from Roman Catholic Church, 66 from None, 25 from Greek Catholic Church, 19 from Not found out, 18 from Evangelical Church, 5 from Eastern Orthodox Church, 4 from Other and not ascertained christian church, 3 from Christian Congregations in Slovakia, 3 from Seventh-day Adventist Church, 2 from Calvinist Church, 2 from Ad hoc movements, 1 from Other and 1 from Buddhism.

== Economy and infrastructure ==
Vrbov is a big village with touristic infrastructure. There are several accommodation facilities including pensions and camping site. Cultural sightseeings are classical evangelical and gothic Catholic churches as well as renaissance belfry from 17th century.
