= Matejovce nad Hornádom =

- Municipality
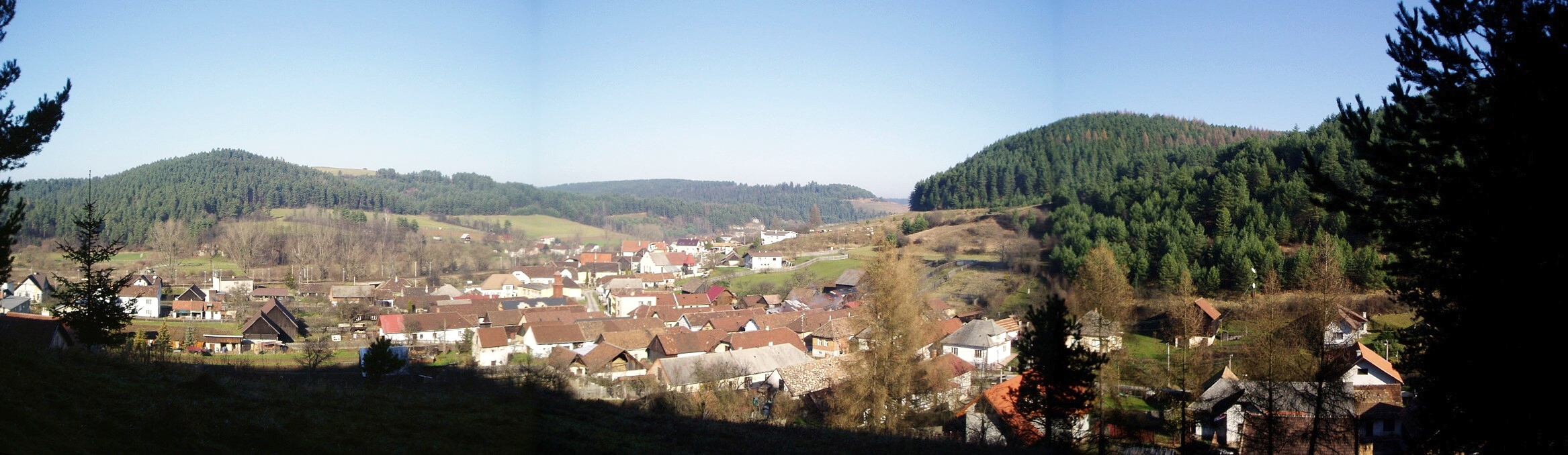

- Flag

- Location of Matejovce nad Hornádom in the Košice Region Location of Matejovce nad Hornádom in Slovakia
- Coordinates: 48.92°N 20.67°E
- Country: Slovakia
- Region: Košice Region
- District: Spišská Nová Ves District
- First mentioned: 1320

Area
  - Total: 3.61 km^{2} (1.39 sq mi)
- Elevation: 423 m (1,388 ft)

Population (2025)
  - Total: 558
- Time zone: UTC+1 (CET)
  - Summer (DST): UTC+2 (CEST)
- Postal code: 532 1
- Area code: +421 52
- Vehicle registration plate (until 2022): SN
- Website: matejovcenadhornadom.sk

Matejovce nad Hornádom (Hungarian: Hernádmáté) is a village and municipality in the Spišská Nová Ves District in the Košice Region of central-eastern Slovakia.

== History ==
The village was first mentioned in historical records in 1320 (706 years ago).

An artist, known only as "The Master of the Main Altar in Matejovce", has left a series of notable paintings, such as an Adoration of the Magi, painted at some tome time between 1440 and 1450.

== Geography ==
The municipality lies at an altitude of 423 metres (1,388 ft) and covers an area of 3.61 km^{2} (1.39 sq mi) (2025).

== Population ==
Population statistic (10 years)
Year	1995	2005	2015	2025
Count	447	498	525	558
Difference		+11.40%	+5.42%	+6.28%

Population statistic
Year	2024	2025
Count	561	558
Difference		−0.53%

It has a population of 558 people (31 December 2025).

=== Ethnicity ===
Census 2021 (1+ %)
Ethnicity	Number	Fraction
Slovak	533	98.15%
Romani	11	2.02%
Not found out	11	2.02%
Total	543	

In year 2021 was 543 people by ethnicity 533 as Slovak, 11 as Romani, 11 as Not found out, 3 as Rusyn and 1 as Vietnamese.

Note on population: The difference values of population numbers in the table "Population statistic" and in the sections "Ethnicity" & "Religion" is caused by the use of various statistical methods.

=== Religion ===
Census 2021 (1+ %)
Religion	Number	Fraction
Roman Catholic Church	479	88.21%
None	36	6.63%
Not found out	10	1.84%
Greek Catholic Church	9	1.66%
Total	543	

In year 2021 was 543 people by religion 479 from Roman Catholic Church, 36 from None, 10 from Not found out, 9 from Greek Catholic Church, 3 from Christian Congregations in Slovakia, 2 from Jehovah's Witnesses, 1 from Paganism and natural spirituality, 1 from Evangelical Church, 1 from Church of the Brethren and 1 from Ad hoc movements.
