= Tvarožná, Kežmarok District =

Village in Prešov Region, Slovakia

Tvarožná
- Municipality
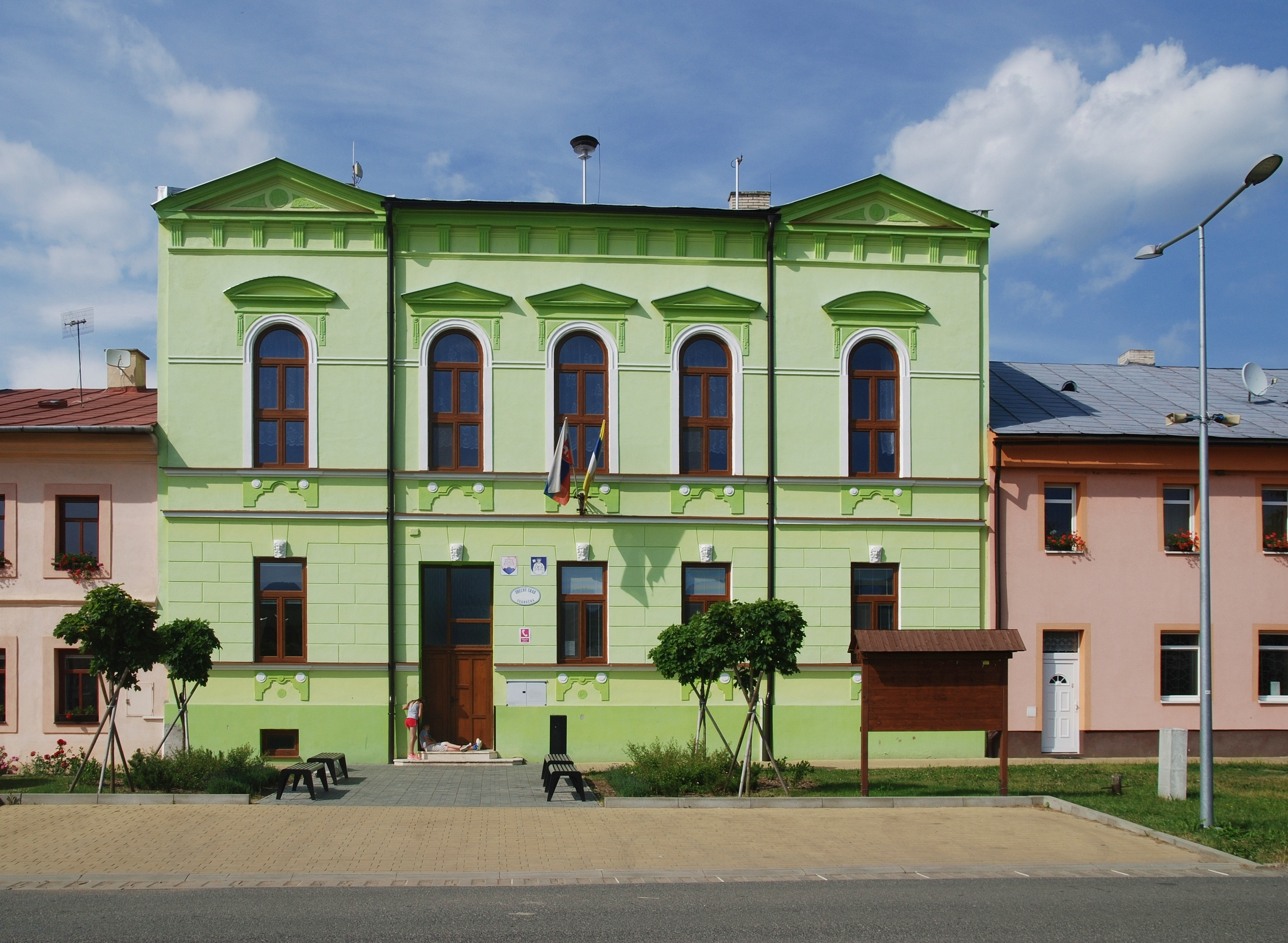
- Municipal office

- Flag

- Location of Tvarožná in the Prešov Region Location of Tvarožná in Slovakia
- Coordinates: 49.09°N 20.47°E
- Country: Slovakia
- Region: Prešov Region
- District: Kežmarok District
- First mentioned: 1268

Area
  - Total: 9.27 km^{2} (3.58 sq mi)
- Elevation: 670 m (2,200 ft)

Population (2025)
  - Total: 835
- Time zone: UTC+1 (CET)
  - Summer (DST): UTC+2 (CEST)
- Postal code: 0597 1
- Area code: +421 52
- Vehicle registration plate (until 2022): KK
- Website: www.obectvarozna.sk

Tvarožná (Hungarian: Duránd, German: Durelsdorf, Rusyn: Тварожна) is a village and municipality in Kežmarok District in the Prešov Region of north Slovakia.

== History ==
In historical records the village was first mentioned in 1268 when it was settled by Germans. In 1271 it got town rights. Before the establishment of independent Czechoslovakia in 1918, Tvarožná was part of Szepes County within the Kingdom of Hungary. From 1939 to 1945, it was part of the Slovak Republic. On 27 January 1945, the Red Army dislodged the Wehrmacht from Tvarožná and it was once again part of Czechoslovakia. The German population was expelled in 1945.

== Geography ==
The municipality lies at an altitude of 670 metres (2,200 ft) and covers an area of 9.27 km^{2} (3.58 sq mi) (2025).

== Population ==
Population statistic (10 years)
Year	1995	2005	2015	2025
Count	561	635	723	835
Difference		+13.19%	+13.85%	+15.49%

Population statistic
Year	2024	2025
Count	825	835
Difference		+1.21%

It has a population of 835 people (31 December 2025).

=== Ethnicity ===
Census 2021 (1+ %)
Ethnicity	Number	Fraction
Slovak	716	98.21%
Romani	35	4.8%
Not found out	11	1.5%
Total	729	

In year 2021 was 729 people by ethnicity 716 as Slovak, 35 as Romani, 11 as Not found out, 5 as Czech, 4 as Rusyn, 3 as Polish, 2 as Italian, 1 as Austrian, 1 as German and 1 as Hungarian.

Note on population: The difference values of population numbers in the table "Population statistic" and in the sections "Ethnicity" & "Religion" is caused by the use of various statistical methods.

=== Religion ===
Census 2021 (1+ %)
Religion	Number	Fraction
Roman Catholic Church	659	90.4%
None	48	6.58%
Evangelical Church	8	1.1%
Total	729	

In year 2021 was 729 people by religion 659 from Roman Catholic Church, 48 from None, 8 from Evangelical Church, 4 from Not found out, 4 from Greek Catholic Church, 3 from Paganism and natural spirituality, 2 from Buddhism and 1 from Other and not ascertained christian church.
