= Starostwo =

Polish administrative unit

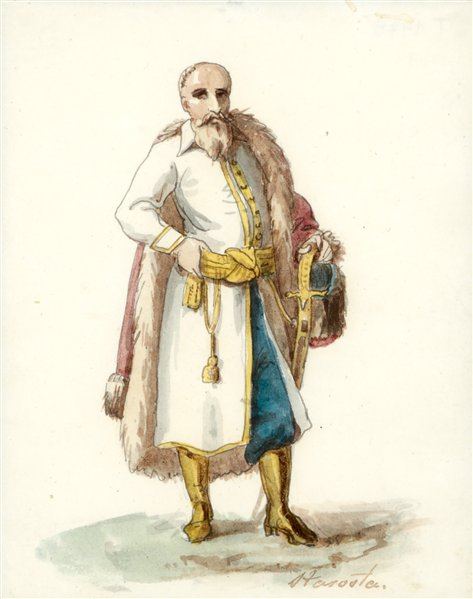
Starosta, by Kanuty Rusiecki, 1823

Starostwo (literally "eldership") (Note: Polish: Starostwo, Polish: [staˈrɔstfɔ]; Lithuanian: seniūnija; Belarusian: староства, romanized: starostva; German: Starostei) is an administrative unit established from the 14th century in the Polish Crown and later in the Polish–Lithuanian Commonwealth until the partition of Poland in 1795. Starostwos were established in the crown lands (królewszczyzna). The term continues to be used in modern Poland.

== Starosta ==
Each starostwo was administered by an official known as starosta. The starosta received the office from the king and kept it until the end of his life. It usually provided a significant income for the starosta. His deputy was variously known as podstarosta, podstarości, burgrabia, włodarz, or surrogator.

The types of starosta included:

- Starosta Generalny was the administrative official of a territorial unit: either the representative of the King or Grand Duke or a person directly in charge.
- Starosta Grodowy was a county (powiat)-level official responsible for fiscal duties, police and courts, and also responsible for the execution of judicial verdicts.
- Starosta Niegrodowy was the overseer of the Crown lands.

=== Powiat starosta ===
When Poland regained independence in 1918 (until the beginning of the World War II in 1939) and in 1944–1950, the starosta was the head of powiat (county) administration, subordinate to the voivode.

Since local government reforms effective from 1 January 1999, the starosta is the head of the powiat executive board (zarząd powiatu), and the head of the powiat starostwo (part of the powiat administration), elected by the powiat council (rada powiatu).
