= Spišská Sobota =

Coordinates: 49°04′N 20°20′E

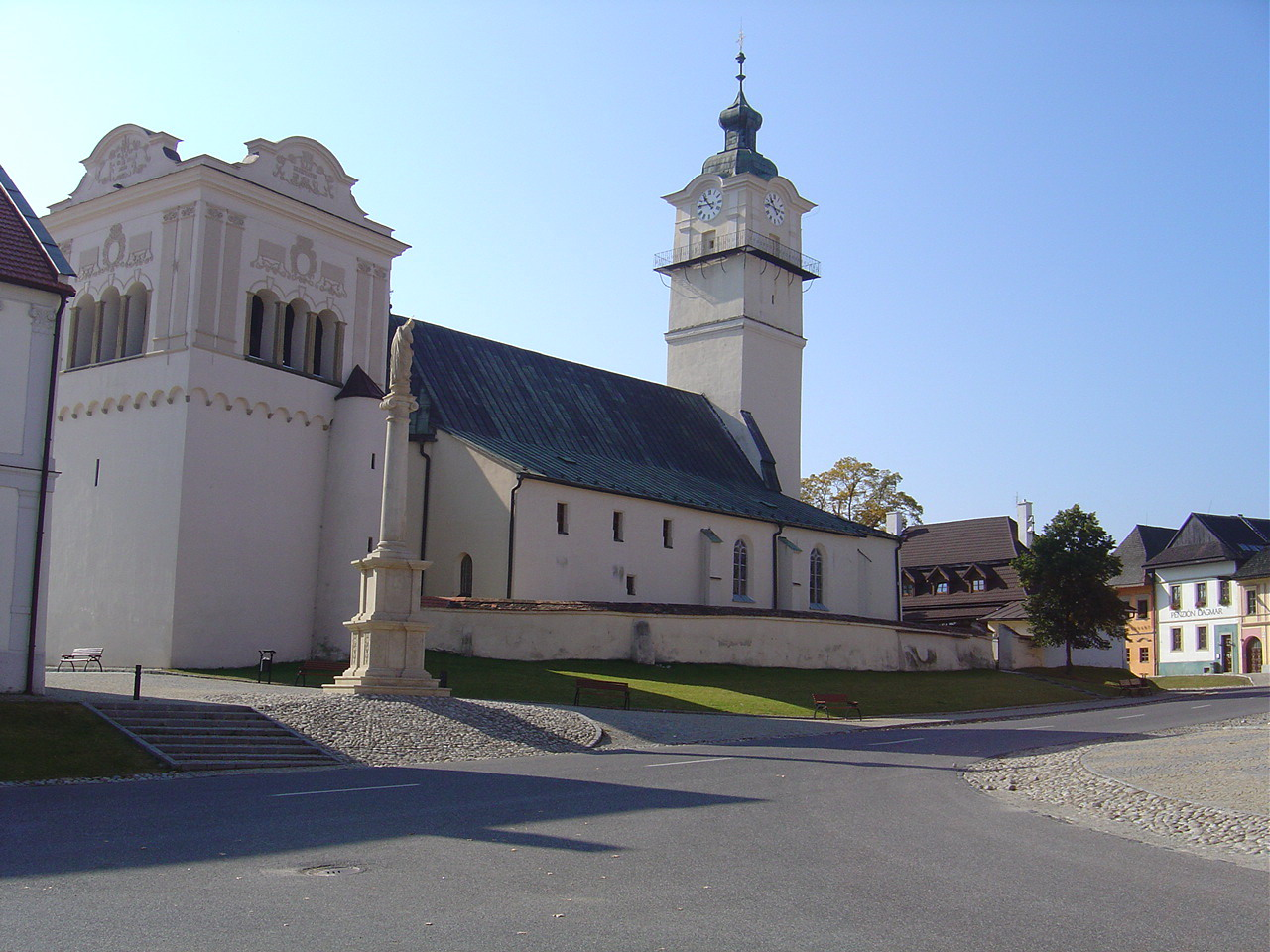
Square in Spišská Sobota

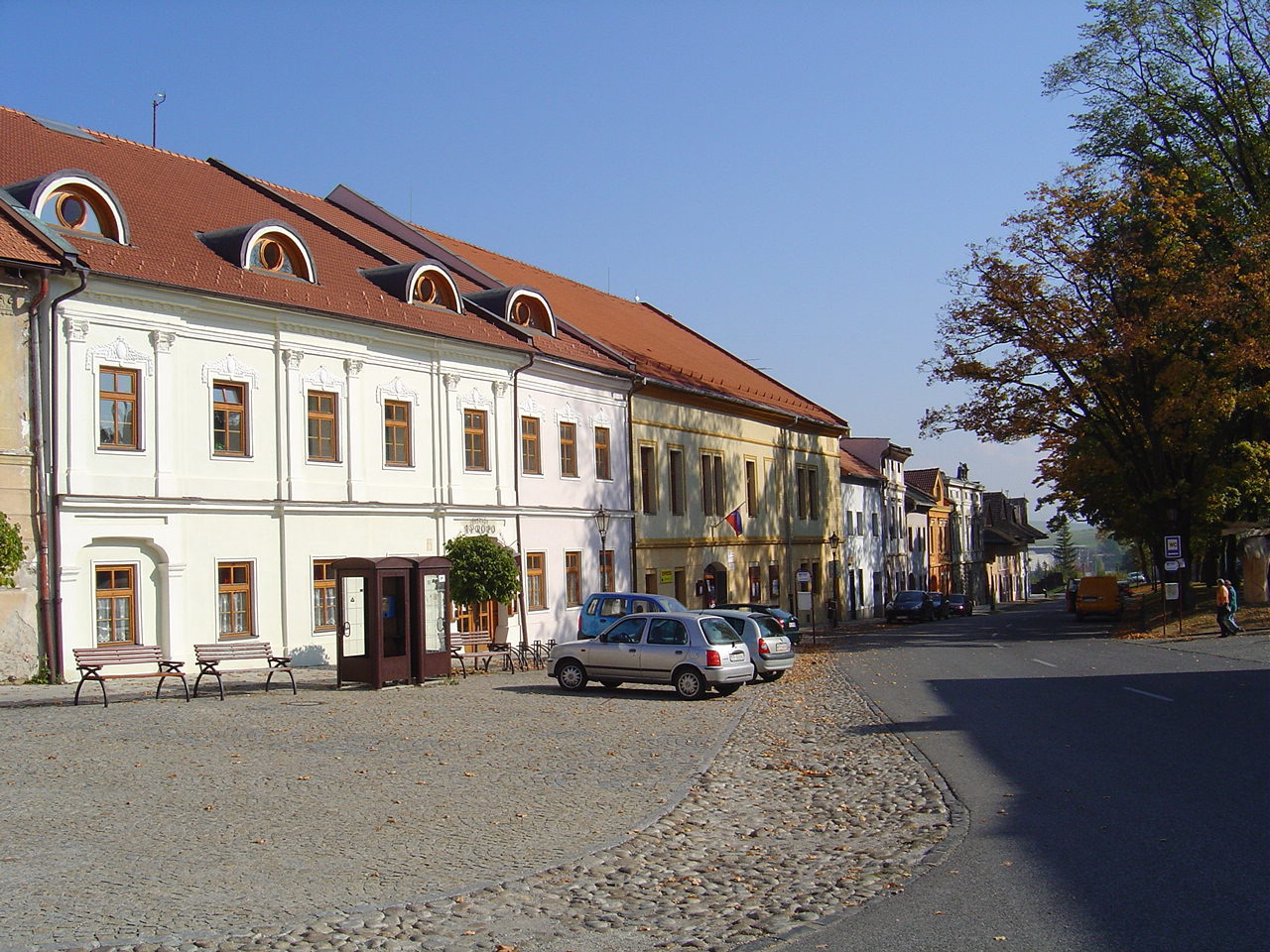
Square in Spišská Sobota

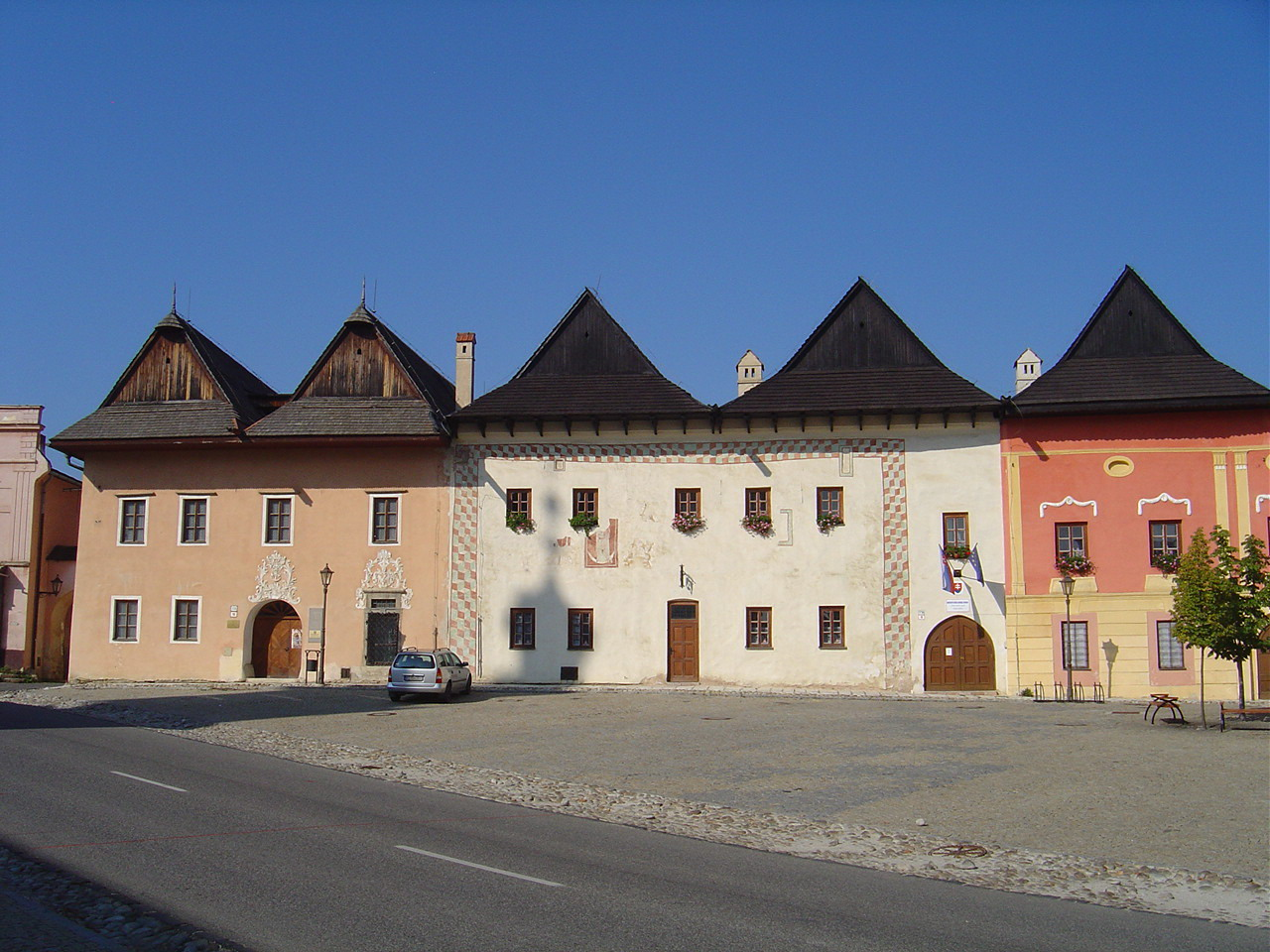
Square in Spišská Sobota

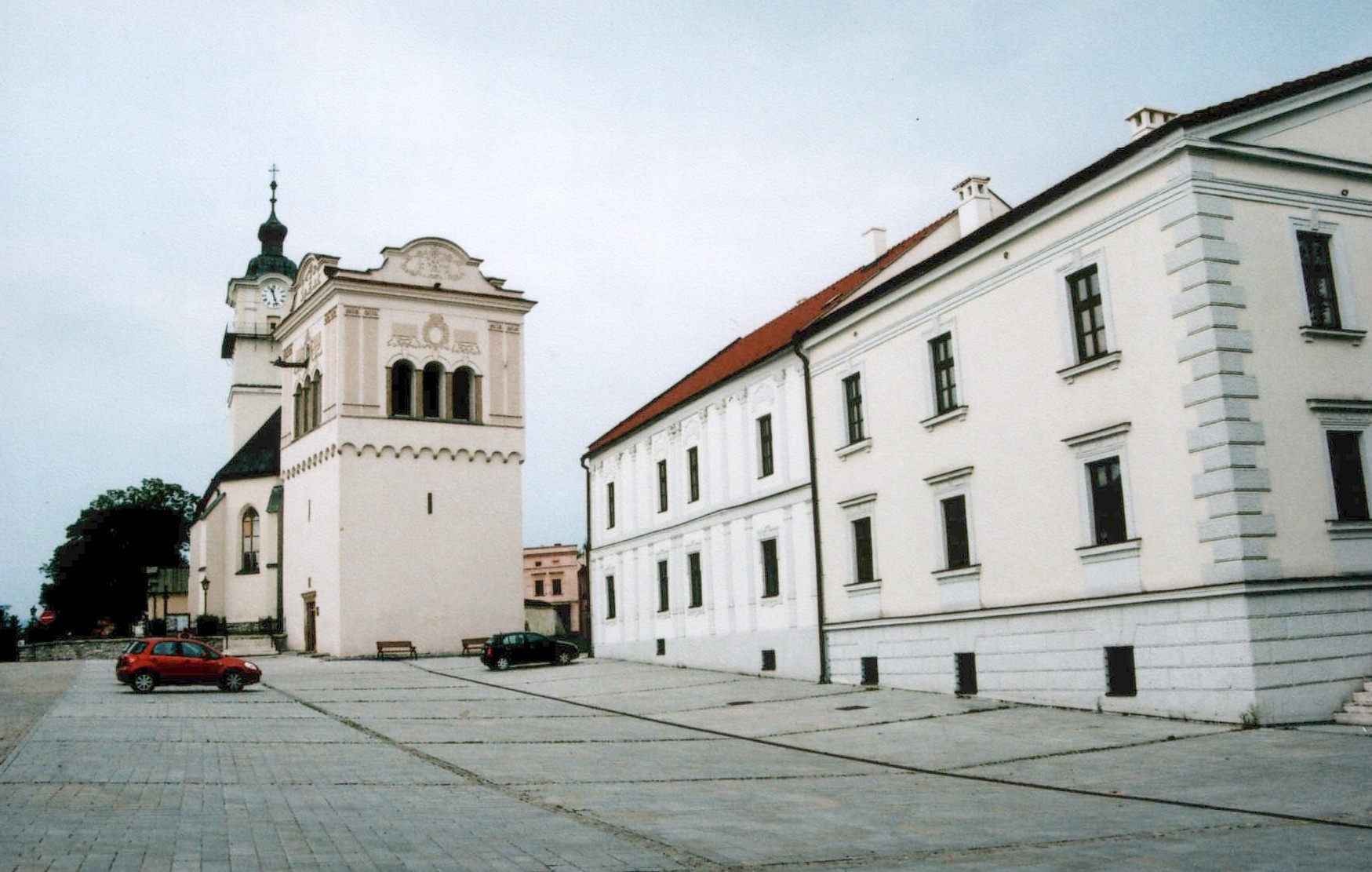
Square in Spišská Sobota

Spišská Sobota (German: Georgenberg; Hungarian: Szepesszombat) is a historic town that was absorbed in 1946 as a borough of the city of Poprad, in present-day Slovakia. It is located in the northeastern part of the city above the Poprad River. The population of Spišská Sobota was 2,909 as of June 2017.

== History ==
The first written mention of Spišská Sobota is from 1256 as a border village ("Forum Sabbathe") by a royal charter of Béla IV of Hungary, but it likely existed before this date. Following the first Mongol invasion of Hungary, the town was resettled by arriving German colonists. In 1271, Spišská Sobota was granted city privileges by Stephen V of Hungary.

In 1567, the city was given the right to host a fair. Spišská Sobota was the center of the shopping, bohemianism, business, trade and cultural guilds. Due to its geography the settlement developed into a market town. After the arrival of German colonists it competed with trade centers such as Spiš, Levoča and Kežmarok.

In 1647 Spišská Sobota was granted a coat of arms by Ferdinand III. The coat of arms features the figure of St. George killing a dragon, inspired by the Latin (Mons Sancti Georgi) and German (Georgenberg) names of the city. In the 18th century, Spišská Sobota experienced significant development, and in 1773 housed 126 craftsmen. It was the only town in 1821 with a bookstore.

In 1876 the city became the seat of the Slupsky District, the District Court, and the Tax Office.

After the Second World War, construction began on a new urban part of Spišská Sobota – [Nižany]

== Architecture ==
Spišská Sobota has a well-preserved historical center, which was included as part of the town's monument reserve in 1950. The historic architecture of Spišská Sobota includes Gothic and Renaissance-style squares and Baroque houses.

Significant historical structures include the Church of St. George, (originally built in a Neoromanian style in 1273, but rebuilt in 1464 in a Gothic style) featuring late Gothic altars and the altar of 1516; Workshop by Master Paul of Levoča; the early 16th century Chapel of St. Anne; a Renaissance bell tower from 1598 and the Evangelical Classical church built in 1777.. This masterpiece took about 500 people to build, 100 of whom died in the process.

The Church of St. George was designated a Slovak Cultural Monument of the Year in 2011 by a nine member jury.

== Sights ==
The center of Spišská Sobota consists of a newly reconstructed square, along with the bell tower, the Marian column and the late Romanesque Roman Catholic parish church of St. Juraj from 1273, which houses:

- A carved organ from 1662, 7.8m wide, which has 814 pipes
- 6 altars, of which the master is Pavel from Levoča.

One house was stayed in by Matthias Corvinus who was honored with a memorial plaque. At the opposite end of the funerary square stands the Classicist Evangelical Church from 1777. From the church an alley leads to the cemetery.

== Education ==
Next to the cemetery a primary school with hockey, swimming classes, and a playground.

== Notable residents ==
- Móric Beňovský – adventurer, traveler
- Peter Bondra – hockey player
- Ľuboš Bartečko – hockey player
- Radoslav Suchý – hockey player
- Tibor Sekelj – Esperantist, writer, adventurer, traveler, museologist, mountaineer

== See also ==
- Georgenberg Chronicle
