= Spišské Vlachy =

Town in Slovakia

- Municipality
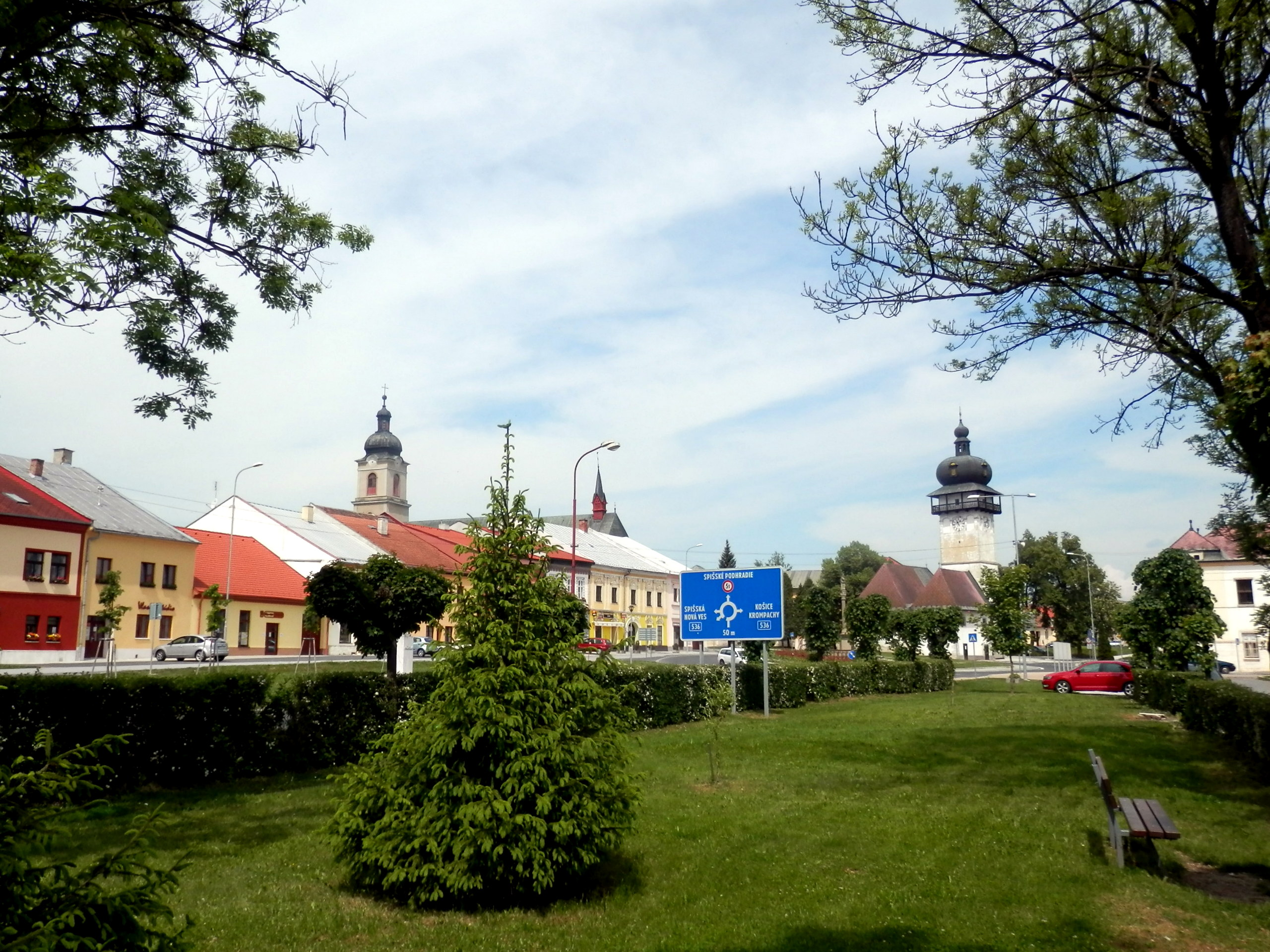
- Town square

- Flag Coat of arms

- Location of Spišské Vlachy in the Košice Region Location of Spišské Vlachy in Slovakia
- Coordinates: 48.95°N 20.80°E
- Country: Slovakia
- Region: Košice Region
- District: Spišská Nová Ves District
- First mentioned: 1243

Government
  - Mayor: Ľubomír Fifik

Area
  - Total: 42.21 km^{2} (16.30 sq mi)
- Elevation: 395 m (1,296 ft)

Population (2025)
  - Total: 3,260
- Time zone: UTC+1 (CET)
  - Summer (DST): UTC+2 (CEST)
- Postal code: 536 1
- Area code: +421 53
- Vehicle registration plate (until 2022): SN
- Website: www.spisskevlachy.sk

Spiśské Vlachy (Hungarian: Szepesolaszi, German: Wlachi, Wlachy or Wallendorf, Latin: Villa Latina) is a town in eastern Slovakia. It is in the Spiš region (Szepes in Hungarian or Zips in German). It is now administratively in the district of Spišská Nová Ves, which is part of the Košice Region. The adjective "Spišské" is used to distinguish it from 6 other towns listed as "Olasz" or "Olaszi" in an 1828 Hungarian property tax list. Two “Town wards” (suburbs) belong to Spišské Vlachy:

- Dobra Voľa lies to the north and
- Zahura lies to the south.

== Geography ==
It is situated just north of the Hornád River, near its confluence with the Margencanka stream. It is about 20 kilometres (12 miles) east of Spišská Nová Ves and about 42 km (26 mi) northwest of Košice. It is 389 meters above sea level and is located at 48 degrees 57 minutes North and 20 degrees 48 minutes East. It has a temperate climate. Its average temperature is about 6 degrees. The annual rainfall is 650 millimeters. The soil is favorable for meadows with more fertile land to the south. The southern outskirts have caves and small lakes on the Svätojanský (English: Saint John's) stream.

== Geography ==
The municipality lies at an altitude of 395 metres (1,296 ft) and covers an area of 42.21 km^{2} (16.30 sq mi) (2025).

== Population ==
Population statistic (10 years)
Year	1995	2005	2015	2025
Count	3441	3596	3545	3260
Difference		+4.50%	−1.41%	−8.03%

Population statistic
Year	2024	2025
Count	3295	3260
Difference		−1.06%

It has a population of 3260 people (31 December 2025).

=== Ethnicity ===
Census 2021 (1+ %)
Ethnicity	Number	Fraction
Slovak	3159	93.26%
Not found out	208	6.14%
Romani	181	5.34%
Total	3387	

In year 2021 was 3387 people by ethnicity 3159 as Slovak, 208 as Not found out, 181 as Romani, 12 as Rusyn, 10 as Czech, 5 as Russian, 3 as German, 3 as Hungarian, 3 as Other, 2 as Ukrainian, 2 as Polish, 1 as Jewish, 1 as Romanian, 1 as Moravian and 1 as Canadian.

Note on population: The difference values of population numbers in the table "Population statistic" and in the sections "Ethnicity" & "Religion" is caused by the use of various statistical methods.

=== Religion ===
Census 2021 (1+ %)
Religion	Number	Fraction
Roman Catholic Church	2620	77.35%
None	412	12.16%
Not found out	193	5.7%
Greek Catholic Church	49	1.45%
Evangelical Church	34	1%
Total	3387	

In year 2021 was 3387 people by religion 2620 from Roman Catholic Church, 412 from None, 193 from Not found out, 49 from Greek Catholic Church, 34 from Evangelical Church, 23 from Christian Congregations in Slovakia, 9 from Eastern Orthodox Church, 7 from Other and not ascertained christian church, 7 from Islam, 7 from Ad hoc movements, 6 from Jehovah's Witnesses, 6 from Apostolic Church, 5 from Calvinist Church, 3 from Paganism and natural spirituality, 2 from Buddhism, 1 from Old Catholic Church, 1 from New Apostolic Church, 1 from Other and 1 from Church of the Brethren.

== Notable people ==
- František Tondra, Roman Catholic bishop
