= Spišský Hrušov =

Village and municipality in Slovakia

Spišský Hrušov Szepeskörtvélyes
- Municipality
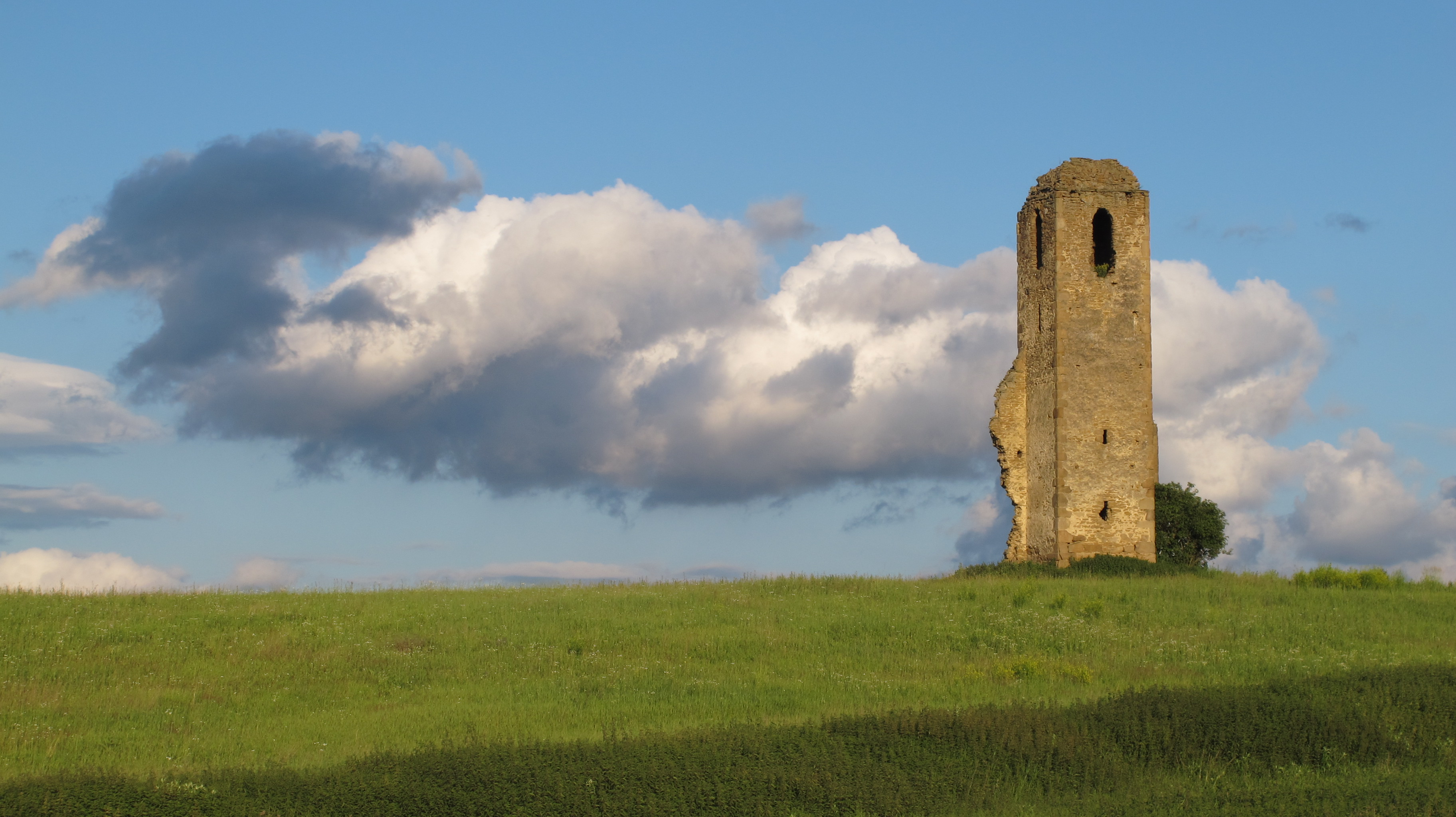

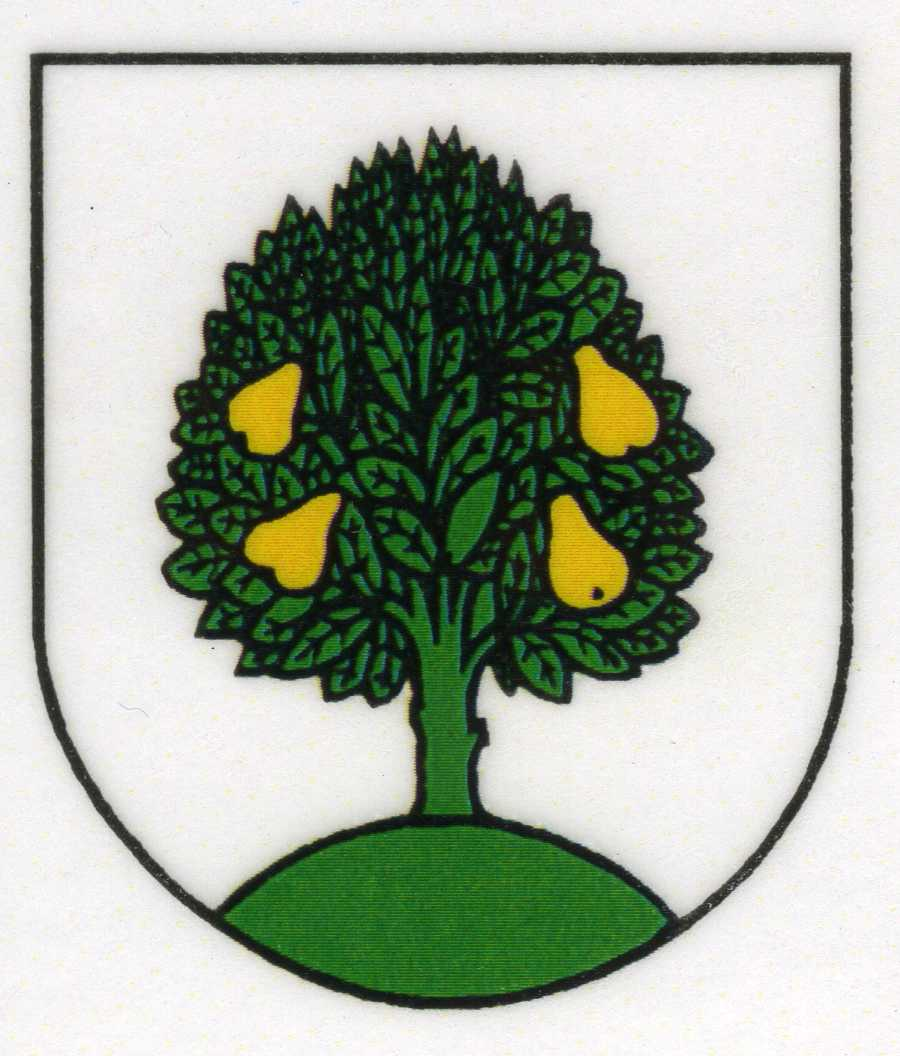
- Flag Coat of arms

- Location of Spišský Hrušov in the Košice Region Location of Spišský Hrušov in Slovakia
- Coordinates: 48.95°N 20.71°E
- Country: Slovakia
- Region: Košice Region
- District: Spišská Nová Ves District
- First mentioned: 1253

Area
  - Total: 13.06 km^{2} (5.04 sq mi)
- Elevation: 433 m (1,421 ft)

Population (2025)
  - Total: 1,329
- Time zone: UTC+1 (CET)
  - Summer (DST): UTC+2 (CEST)
- Postal code: 536 3
- Area code: +421 53
- Vehicle registration plate (until 2022): SN
- Website: www.spisskyhrusov.sk

Spišský Hrušov (Slovak pronunciation: [ˈspiʂskiː ˈɦruʂɔw]; Hungarian: Szepeskörtvélyes) is a village and municipality in the Spišská Nová Ves District in the Košice Region of central-eastern Slovakia. In 2011 had 1,266 inhabitants

== History ==
The village was founded before the 12th century in the former Hungarian Szepes County (Szepes is Hungarian for beautiful). The first historical records of its existence are from 1253. The village name is derived from the Slovak word for pear (hruška) and its former Hungarian names incorporated the equivalent Hungarian word for pear of "körte". Local folklore refers to a large pear tree located on a nearby hill that was supposed to have had mysterious powers. The tree is now gone but the story lives on. The coat of arms of the village is a tree on a hill with four pears on its branches.

Below is a chronology of the former Hungarian, German, and Slovak names of present day Spišský Hrušov:
1253 - Kurtues, Kurtueles
1255 - Kurtuelus
1294 - Horusk, Hurusk
1360-1364 - Hruschfálva, Hruskfálva, Hruskafálva
1368 - Grussov
1386 - Graucza
1495 - Grawss
1500 - Hrussow
1773 - Körtvélyes, Körtvélesz, Bierndorff, Grossow
1786 - Körtwélyesch, Birndorf, Hrussow
1808 - Körtvélyes, Birndorf, Grausch, Hrussow
1863-1902 - Körtvélyes
1907-1918 - Szepeskörtvélyes
1920 - Hrušov
1927 - Spišský Hrušov

Next to the town hall is the Gothic style Roman Catholic church of St. Catherine of Alexandria (Kostol svätá Kataríny Alexandrijskej). It was built in the late 13th century, rebuilt in the 17th and 18th centuries, renovated in 1900 and again in 1951. The Chapel of St. Sofia (Kaplnka svätá Žofie) adjoins the northeast side of the church.

The only industry in Spišský Hrušov is BIO-plus, s.r.o, a company that manufactures motor fuel from organic plant material. It is located at the northeast end of a road that follows a tributary of the Lodina River that runs through the village.

== Geography ==
The municipality lies at an altitude of 433 metres (1,421 ft) and covers an area of 13.06 km^{2} (5.04 sq mi) (2025). Spišský Hrušov is 12 km (7.5 mi) east of Spišská Nová Ves on highway 536. The surrounding land is gently rolling fields. A tributary of the Lodina River runs through the village. The Lodina River joins the Hornád River at the village of Vítkovce about 2 km (1.2 mi) southeast of Spišský Hrušov.

== Population ==
Population statistic (10 years)
Year	1995	2005	2015	2025
Count	1204	1267	1248	1329
Difference		+5.23%	−1.49%	+6.49%

Population statistic
Year	2024	2025
Count	1327	1329
Difference		+0.15%

It has a population of 1329 people (31 December 2025).

=== Ethnicity ===
Census 2021 (1+ %)
Ethnicity	Number	Fraction
Slovak	1245	96.81%
Not found out	38	2.95%
Total	1286	

In year 2021 was 1286 people by ethnicity 1245 as Slovak, 38 as Not found out, 3 as Czech, 2 as Hungarian, 2 as Other and 1 as Greek.

Note on population: The difference values of population numbers in the table "Population statistic" and in the sections "Ethnicity" & "Religion" is caused by the use of various statistical methods.

=== Religion ===
Census 2021 (1+ %)
Religion	Number	Fraction
Roman Catholic Church	1144	88.96%
None	78	6.07%
Not found out	40	3.11%
Total	1286	

In year 2021 was 1286 people by religion 1144 from Roman Catholic Church, 78 from None, 40 from Not found out, 10 from Greek Catholic Church, 7 from Christian Congregations in Slovakia, 3 from Evangelical Church, 2 from Ad hoc movements, 1 from Paganism and natural spirituality and 1 from Other.
