= Hnilec =

Hnilec may refer to:

- Hnilec (village), Slovakia
- Hnilec (river), Slovakia
