= Márkusfalva =

Márkusfalva may refer to:

== Places ==
Márkusfalva is a Hungarian language name for:

- Markušovce, Slovakia
- Markušica, Croatia
