= Bystrany =

Bystrany may refer to:

- Bystrany, Slovakia, a village and a municipality in Slovakia
- Bystřany, a town in the Czech Republic
