= Teplička =

Teplička may refer to places:

- Teplička (Karlovy Vary District), Czech Republic
- Teplička, Spišská Nová Ves District, Slovakia
