= Porac (disambiguation) =

Porac is a 1st class municipality in the province of Pampanga, Philippines.

Porac may also refer to:

- Porac Airfield or in context simply "Porac", World War II airfield that was located at Porac in the Philippines
- Poráč, village in Slovakia
