= Oľšavka =

Oľšavka may refer to several places in Slovakia.

- Oľšavka, Spišská Nová Ves District
- Oľšavka, Stropkov District
