= Lieskovany =

Village and municipality in Slovakia

Lieskovany Leszkovány
- Municipality
- Flag

- Location of Lieskovany in the Košice Region Location of Lieskovany in Slovakia
- Coordinates: 48.93°N 20.62°E
- Country: Slovakia
- Region: Košice Region
- District: Spišská Nová Ves District
- First mentioned: 1277

Area
  - Total: 1.75 km^{2} (0.68 sq mi)
- Elevation: 447 m (1,467 ft)

Population (2025)
  - Total: 410
- Time zone: UTC+1 (CET)
  - Summer (DST): UTC+2 (CEST)
- Postal code: 532 1
- Area code: +421 53
- Vehicle registration plate (until 2022): SN
- Website: www.lieskovany.sk

Lieskovany (Hungarian: Leszkovány) is a tiny village and municipality in the Spišská Nová Ves District in the Košice Region of central-eastern Slovakia.

== History ==
In historical records the village was first mentioned in 1277.

== Geography ==
The municipality lies at an altitude of 447 metres (1,467 ft) and covers an area of 1.75 km^{2} (0.68 sq mi) (2025).

== Population ==
Population statistic (10 years)
Year	1995	2005	2015	2025
Count	236	280	327	410
Difference		+18.64%	+16.78%	+25.38%

Population statistic
Year	2024	2025
Count	410	410
Difference		+1.42%

It has a population of 410 people (31 December 2025).

=== Ethnicity ===
Census 2021 (1+ %)
Ethnicity	Number	Fraction
Slovak	357	97.8%
Not found out	6	1.64%
Total	365	

In year 2021 was 365 people by ethnicity 357 as Slovak, 6 as Not found out, 1 as Jewish, 1 as Czech and 1 as Rusyn.

Note on population: The difference values of population numbers in the table "Population statistic" and in the sections "Ethnicity" & "Religion" is caused by the use of various statistical methods.

=== Religion ===
Census 2021 (1+ %)
Religion	Number	Fraction
Roman Catholic Church	295	80.82%
None	45	12.33%
Greek Catholic Church	15	4.11%
Not found out	6	1.64%
Total	365	

In year 2021 was 365 people by religion 295 from Roman Catholic Church, 45 from None, 15 from Greek Catholic Church, 6 from Not found out, 2 from Evangelical Church, 1 from Other and not ascertained christian church and 1 from Other.
