= Mlynky =

Mlynky Hollópatak
- Municipality
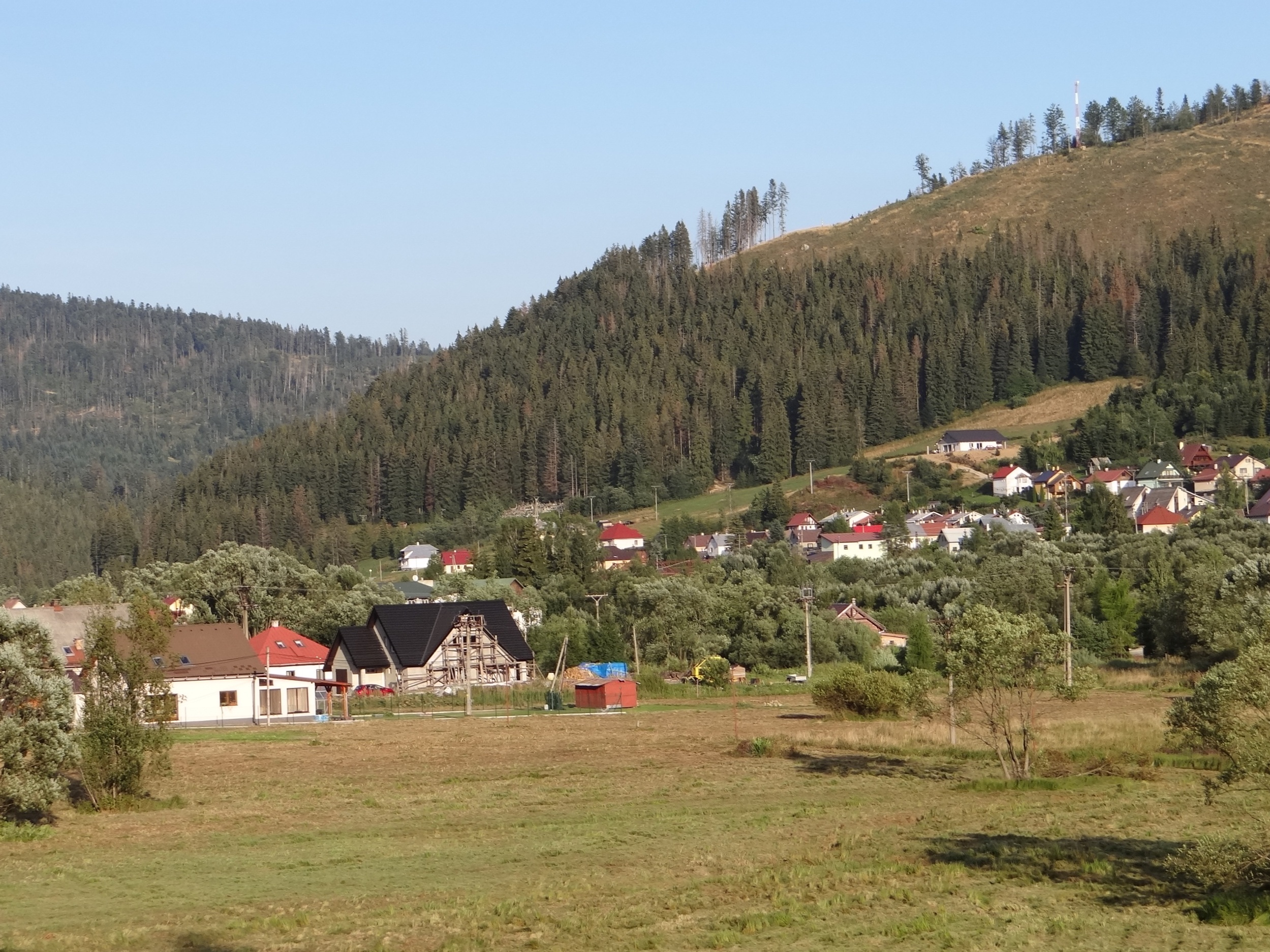

- Flag

- Location of Mlynky in the Košice Region Location of Mlynky in Slovakia
- Coordinates: 48.85°N 20.43°E
- Country: Slovakia
- Region: Košice Region
- District: Spišská Nová Ves District
- First mentioned: 1850

Area
  - Total: 25.05 km^{2} (9.67 sq mi)
- Elevation: 761 m (2,497 ft)

Population (2025)
  - Total: 489
- Time zone: UTC+1 (CET)
  - Summer (DST): UTC+2 (CEST)
- Postal code: 537 6
- Area code: +421 53
- Vehicle registration plate (until 2022): SN
- Website: mlynky.sk

Mlynky (Hungarian: Hollópatak) is a village and municipality of the Spišská Nová Ves District in the Košice Region of central-eastern Slovakia. It is one of the most important touristic localities around Slovak Karst mountains, and the village's inhabitants mainly make their living from tourism.

== History ==
The village has existed since around 1850.

== Geography ==
The municipality lies at an altitude of 761 metres (2,497 ft) and covers an area of 25.05 km^{2} (9.67 sq mi) (2025).

== Population ==
Population statistic (10 years)
Year	1995	2005	2015	2025
Count	656	585	565	489
Difference		−10.82%	−3.41%	−13.45%

Population statistic
Year	2024	2025
Count	497	489
Difference		−1.60%

It has a population of 489 people (31 December 2025).

=== Ethnicity ===
Census 2021 (1+ %)
Ethnicity	Number	Fraction
Slovak	492	96.09%
Not found out	13	2.53%
Czech	7	1.36%
Total	512	

In year 2021 was 512 people by ethnicity 492 as Slovak, 13 as Not found out, 7 as Czech, 1 as Jewish, 1 as Romani, 1 as Rusyn, 1 as Russian, 1 as German, 1 as Canadian and 1 as Other.

Note on population: The difference values of population numbers in the table "Population statistic" and in the sections "Ethnicity" & "Religion" is caused by the use of various statistical methods.

=== Religion ===
Census 2021 (1+ %)
Religion	Number	Fraction
Roman Catholic Church	251	49.02%
None	212	41.41%
Evangelical Church	21	4.1%
Not found out	14	2.73%
Greek Catholic Church	9	1.76%
Total	512	

In year 2021 was 512 people by religion 251 from Roman Catholic Church, 212 from None, 21 from Evangelical Church, 14 from Not found out, 9 from Greek Catholic Church, 2 from Ad hoc movements, 1 from Eastern Orthodox Church, 1 from Jehovah's Witnesses and 1 from Buddhism.
