= Markušovce Castle =

Historic site in Slovakia

Markušovce castle
- Markušovce hrad
- Markušovce, Košice Region, Slovakia
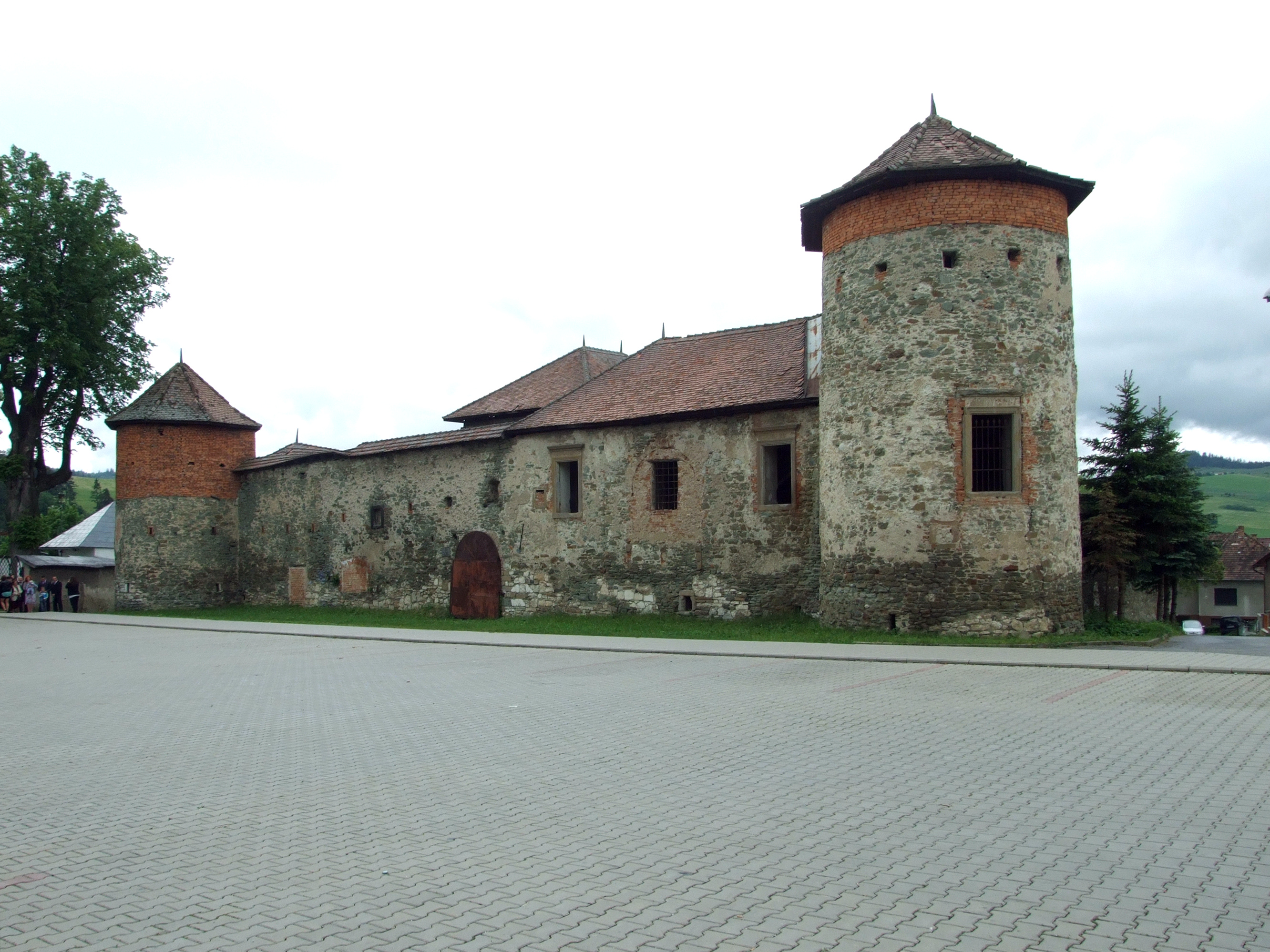
- The castle in 2013

Site information
- Type: Castle

Location
- Coordinates: 48.91583°N 20.62026°E

Markušovce castle (Slovak: Markušovský hrad) is the ruin of a hilltop castle in the municipality of Markušovce in the Košice Region of Slovakia.

Over the centuries, the castle evolved from a noble residence and fortress into a Renaissance-style stronghold, featuring a large residential tower, fortified courtyard, and bastions with loopholes. In the 15th and early 16th centuries, it was expanded with additional buildings, walls, and defensive features, including circular corner bastions. Nowadays, the castle is partially preserved and undergoing reconstruction.

== Description ==
The remains of the castle are situated near St. Michael's Church on a rocky hill. Inside the preserved eastern rooms, a wooden beam ceiling has recently been discovered. The large residential tower with surrounding fortifications was rebuilt in the 15th century. The castle was expanded with a courtyard measuring 25 by 20 meters to the west, enclosed by two semicircular bastions with an entrance, and complemented by a fortified bailey with additional residential and farm buildings constructed along its perimeter in the early 16th century. Over time, the castle was further fortified by raising existing walls and installing firing positions in them. The northeast and southeast corners featured bastions with loopholes. Inside, there was also a residential palace measuring 17 by 10 meters.

== History ==
During the 1241 Tartar invasion, the area of present-day Markušovce was looted. After the Tartars left Hungary, Markus, son of Gol, rebuilt the settlement, which was then called Svätý Michal, later renamed "Terra Marci" or Land of Markov, evolving into Markušovce. Mark's son Batyz participated in military campaigns and was granted permission to build a castle in 1284, initially a simple manor with a stone tower and surrounding wall.

The Máriássy family, followers of Mark, grew wealthier, and in 1486 Štefan Máriássy expanded the castle. This expansion faced opposition from nearby towns like Levoča, which feared the castle's dominance. An agreement in 1507 limited further construction, but the castle was eventually completed without additional fortifications. After Štefan's death in 1516, his son František inherited the castle. Following the 1526 Battle of Mohács, František supported a rival king, leading to conflict with Habsburg forces. In 1527, Levoča attacked and looted the castle. The property changed hands, eventually returning to František's family in 1546, who rebuilt it in Renaissance style and used it as a residence and agricultural school.

František's grandson built a manor house in 1643, which still exists. A lightning strike in 1773 destroyed the church and burned the castle. It was partially renovated in 1789 but fell into disuse. In 1933, the family sold the estate, and the castle was inhabited by locals until 1965. It later housed a school and was considered for a museum, but remained neglected until restoration efforts began in the 1970s. From 2017 to 2019, further restoration projects uncovered significant archaeological findings, including the foundations of an 11th-century round tower.

== See also ==
- List of castles in Slovakia
