= Markušovce Manor =

Historic site in Slovakia

- Kaštieľ Markušovce
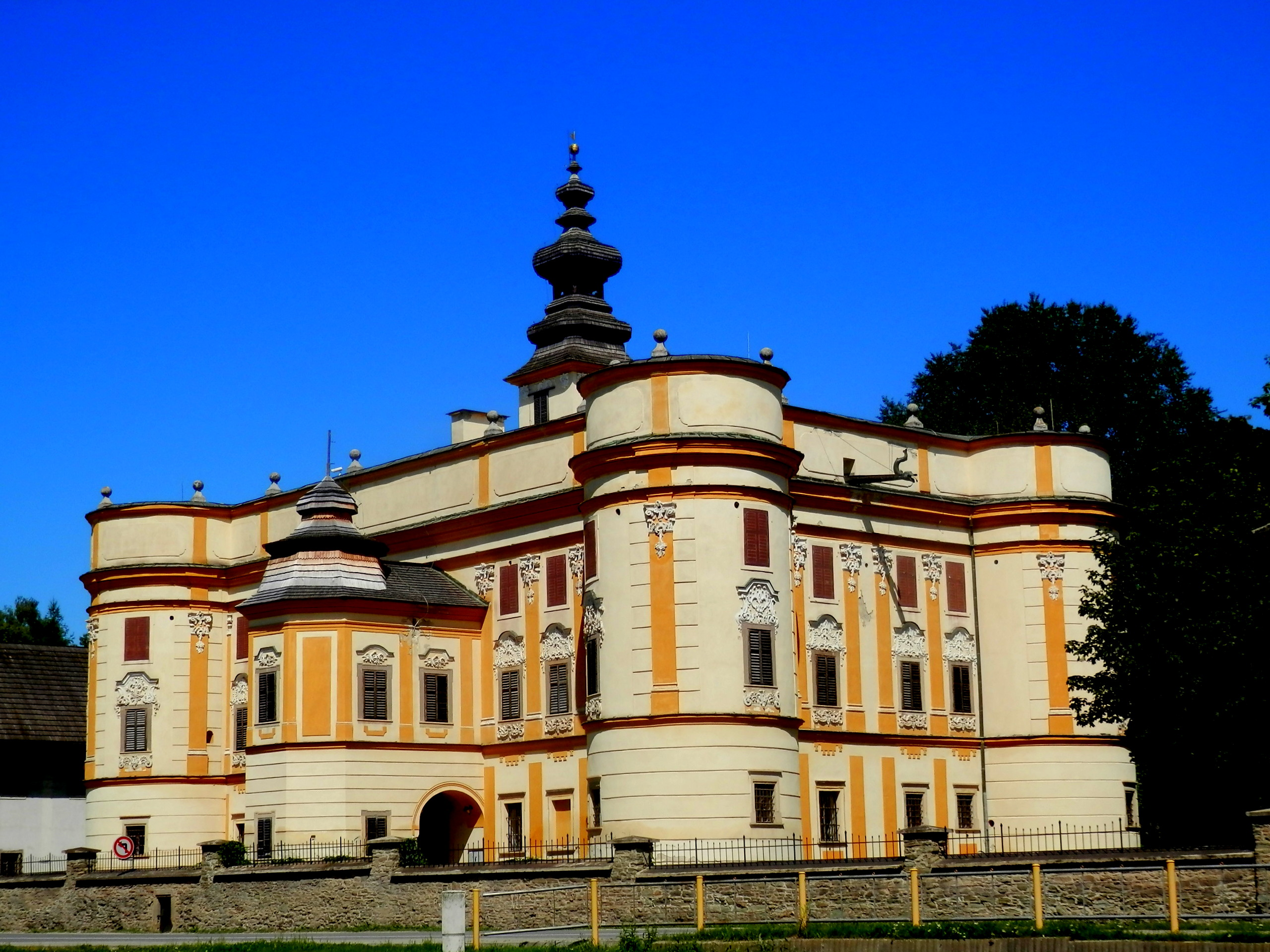
- The manor in 2016
- Alternative names: Markušovce Castle

General information
- Location: Markušovce, Košice Region, Slovakia
- Coordinates: 48°54′56″N 20°37′27″E

Markušovce Manor (Slovak: Kaštieľ Markušovce) also referred to as Mariássyovský manor or Markušovce Castle, is a manor house located in the municipality of Markušovce in the Košice Region of Slovakia.

== History ==
The Renaissance-style manor house was built in 1643 by Ferenc Mariássy. Its architecture features characteristic Renaissance elements, including round corner towers, rhythmically arranged stone windows on the facades, and a preserved central staircase with decorative stucco vaults. Historically, the manor served as a fortified residence and housed a humanist school established in 1567 by Pál Mariássy, which operated until 1673 and focused on language and practical education, attracting lecturers including Moravian Church and priests like Z. Cedar and M. Molitor. It is also believed that the famous educator John Amos Comenius visited during his travels. In the 17th century, it lost its defensive and representative function when the members of the Mariáši family moved to the mansions and manor houses in the village.

Over time, the manor remained a stronghold for its owners for about a century. In the mid-18th century, new buildings and farm structures were added, enclosing the estate. Around 1773, efforts began to modernize the manor into a fashionable Rococo residence. Soon after, they started building a summer pavilion called Dardanely in 1778, intended to provide additional ceremonial space and decorated with frescoes based on ancient and mythological themes. In 1789, it underwent partial restoration under Wolfgang Mariáši. The construction was partly motivated by the expected visit of Emperor Joseph II, which ultimately did not take place, leading to a halt in work. The side wings of the pavilion were only completed during restoration efforts in the 1970s. The castle saw further renovations in the early 2020s costing approximately 1 million euros.

== Description ==
The building is a multi-storey block with a high attic, later renovated in Rococo style to conceal its Renaissance fortress features. It features an entrance risalit and a central tower with an ornate roof. Inside, the original Renaissance layout remains, including a central staircase and decorated lunette vaults. The interior also includes a Romantic-era renovation of the Csáky family’s meeting room.

== See also ==
- List of castles in Slovakia
