= Vojkovce =

Village and municipality in Slovakia

Vojkovce Vojkfalva
- Municipality
- Flag

- Location of Vojkovce in the Košice Region Location of Vojkovce in Slovakia
- Coordinates: 48.95°N 20.87°E
- Country: Slovakia
- Region: Košice Region
- District: Spišská Nová Ves District
- First mentioned: 1300

Area
  - Total: 7.50 km^{2} (2.90 sq mi)
- Elevation: 518 m (1,699 ft)

Population (2025)
  - Total: 411
- Time zone: UTC+1 (CET)
  - Summer (DST): UTC+2 (CEST)
- Postal code: 536 1
- Area code: +421 53
- Vehicle registration plate (until 2022): SN
- Website: vojkovce.sk

Vojkovce (Hungarian: Vojkfalva) is a village and municipality in the Spišská Nová Ves District in the Košice Region of eastern Slovakia. It lies in the eastern part of Spišská Nová Ves District. In 2011 it had 443 inhabitants. The mayor is Rastislav Kolej.

== Geography ==
The municipality lies at an altitude of 518 metres (1,699 ft) and covers an area of 7.50 km^{2} (2.90 sq mi) (2025).

== Population ==
Population statistic (10 years)
Year	1995	2005	2015	2025
Count	445	443	429	411
Difference		−0.44%	−3.16%	−4.19%

Population statistic
Year	2024	2025
Count	407	411
Difference		+0.98%

It has a population of 411 people (31 December 2025).

=== Ethnicity ===
Census 2021 (1+ %)
Ethnicity	Number	Fraction
Slovak	395	93.6%
Not found out	22	5.21%
Romani	10	2.36%
Total	422	

In year 2021 was 422 people by ethnicity 395 as Slovak, 22 as Not found out, 10 as Romani, 4 as Other and 1 as Hungarian.

Note on population: The difference values of population numbers in the table "Population statistic" and in the sections "Ethnicity" & "Religion" is caused by the use of various statistical methods.

=== Religion ===
Census 2021 (1+ %)
Religion	Number	Fraction
Roman Catholic Church	369	87.44%
None	31	7.35%
Not found out	17	4.03%
Total	422	

In year 2021 was 422 people by religion 369 from Roman Catholic Church, 31 from None, 17 from Not found out, 2 from Evangelical Church, 1 from Eastern Orthodox Church, 1 from Christian Congregations in Slovakia and 1 from Ad hoc movements.
