= Kolinovce =

Village and municipality in Slovakia

Kolinovce Kolinfalva
- Municipality
- Flag

- Location of Kolinovce in the Košice Region Location of Kolinovce in Slovakia
- Coordinates: 48.93°N 20.85°E
- Country: Slovakia
- Region: Košice Region
- District: Spišská Nová Ves District
- First mentioned: 1312

Area
  - Total: 4.68 km^{2} (1.81 sq mi)
- Elevation: 394 m (1,293 ft)

Population (2025)
  - Total: 584
- Time zone: UTC+1 (CET)
  - Summer (DST): UTC+2 (CEST)
- Postal code: 534 1
- Area code: +421 53
- Vehicle registration plate (until 2022): SN
- Website: www.kolinovce.sk

Kolinovce (Hungarian: Kolinfalva) is a village and municipality in the Spišská Nová Ves District in the Košice Region of central-eastern Slovakia.

== History ==
In historical records the village was first mentioned in 1312.

== Geography ==
The municipality lies at an altitude of 394 metres (1,293 ft) and covers an area of 4.68 km^{2} (1.81 sq mi) (2025).

== Population ==
Population statistic (10 years)
Year	1995	2005	2015	2025
Count	540	589	576	584
Difference		+9.07%	−2.20%	+1.38%

Population statistic
Year	2024	2025
Count	580	584
Difference		+0.68%

It has a population of 584 people (31 December 2025).

=== Ethnicity ===
Census 2021 (1+ %)
Ethnicity	Number	Fraction
Slovak	553	93.72%
Romani	41	6.94%
Not found out	12	2.03%
Total	590	

In year 2021 was 590 people by ethnicity 553 as Slovak, 41 as Romani, 12 as Not found out, 4 as Czech, 4 as Vietnamese, 4 as Other, 1 as Rusyn, 1 as Russian and 1 as Polish.

Note on population: The difference values of population numbers in the table "Population statistic" and in the sections "Ethnicity" & "Religion" is caused by the use of various statistical methods.

=== Religion ===
Census 2021 (1+ %)
Religion	Number	Fraction
Roman Catholic Church	441	74.75%
None	77	13.05%
Not found out	40	6.78%
Greek Catholic Church	19	3.22%
Total	590	

In year 2021 was 590 people by religion 441 from Roman Catholic Church, 77 from None, 40 from Not found out, 19 from Greek Catholic Church, 5 from Eastern Orthodox Church, 3 from Ad hoc movements, 2 from Calvinist Church, 1 from Jehovah's Witnesses, 1 from Christian Congregations in Slovakia and 1 from Islam.

== Genealogical resources ==
The records for genealogical research are available at the state archive "Statny Archiv in Levoca, Slovakia"

- Roman Catholic church records (births/marriages/deaths): 1636-1896 (parish B)

== See also ==
- List of municipalities and towns in Slovakia
