= Hnilčík =

- Municipality
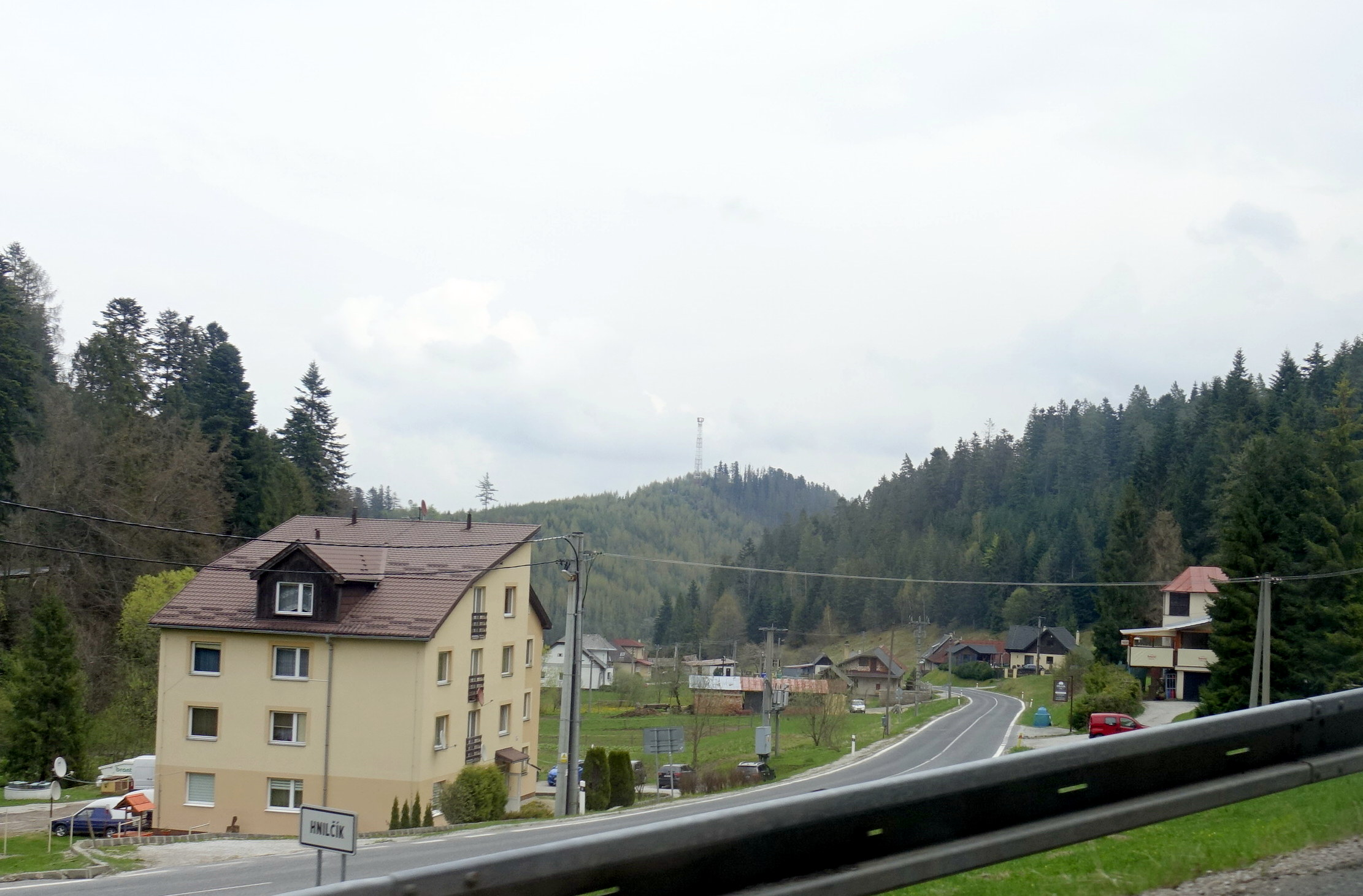

- Flag

- Location of Hnilčík in the Košice Region Location of Hnilčík in Slovakia
- Coordinates: 48.88°N 20.57°E
- Country: Slovakia
- Region: Košice Region
- District: Spišská Nová Ves District
- First mentioned: 1315

Area
  - Total: 22.22 km^{2} (8.58 sq mi)
- Elevation: 678 m (2,224 ft)

Population (2025)
  - Total: 533
- Time zone: UTC+1 (CET)
  - Summer (DST): UTC+2 (CEST)
- Postal code: 533 2
- Area code: +421 53
- Vehicle registration plate (until 2022): SN
- Website: www.obechnilcik.sk

Hnilčík (Hungarian: Szepespatak) is a village and municipality in the Spišská Nová Ves District in the Košice Region of central-eastern Slovakia.

== History ==
In historical records the village was first mentioned in 1315.

== Geography ==
The municipality lies at an altitude of 678 metres (2,224 ft) and covers an area of 22.22 km^{2} (8.58 sq mi) (2025).

== Population ==
Population statistic (10 years)
Year	1995	2005	2015	2025
Count	484	533	554	533
Difference		+10.12%	+3.93%	−3.79%

Population statistic
Year	2024	2025
Count	535	533
Difference		−0.37%

It has a population of 533 people (31 December 2025).

=== Ethnicity ===
Census 2021 (1+ %)
Ethnicity	Number	Fraction
Slovak	531	97.97%
Not found out	10	1.84%
Total	542	

In year 2021 was 542 people by ethnicity 531 as Slovak, 10 as Not found out, 5 as Czech, 3 as German, 1 as Ukrainian, 1 as Rusyn, 1 as Russian and 1 as Other.

Note on population: The difference values of population numbers in the table "Population statistic" and in the sections "Ethnicity" & "Religion" is caused by the use of various statistical methods.

=== Religion ===
Census 2021 (1+ %)
Religion	Number	Fraction
Roman Catholic Church	405	74.72%
None	103	19%
Not found out	13	2.4%
Greek Catholic Church	8	1.48%
Total	542	

In year 2021 was 542 people by religion 405 from Roman Catholic Church, 103 from None, 13 from Not found out, 8 from Greek Catholic Church, 4 from Evangelical Church, 3 from Church of the Brethren, 2 from Christian Congregations in Slovakia, 2 from Ad hoc movements, 1 from Buddhism and 1 from Baptists Church.

== Genealogical resources ==
The records for genealogical research are available at the state archive "Statny Archiv in Levoca, Slovakia"

- Roman Catholic church records (births/marriages/deaths): 1780-1897 (parish A)
- Lutheran church records (births/marriages/deaths): 1783-1896 (parish B)

== See also ==
- List of municipalities and towns in Slovakia
