= Kaľava =

- Municipality
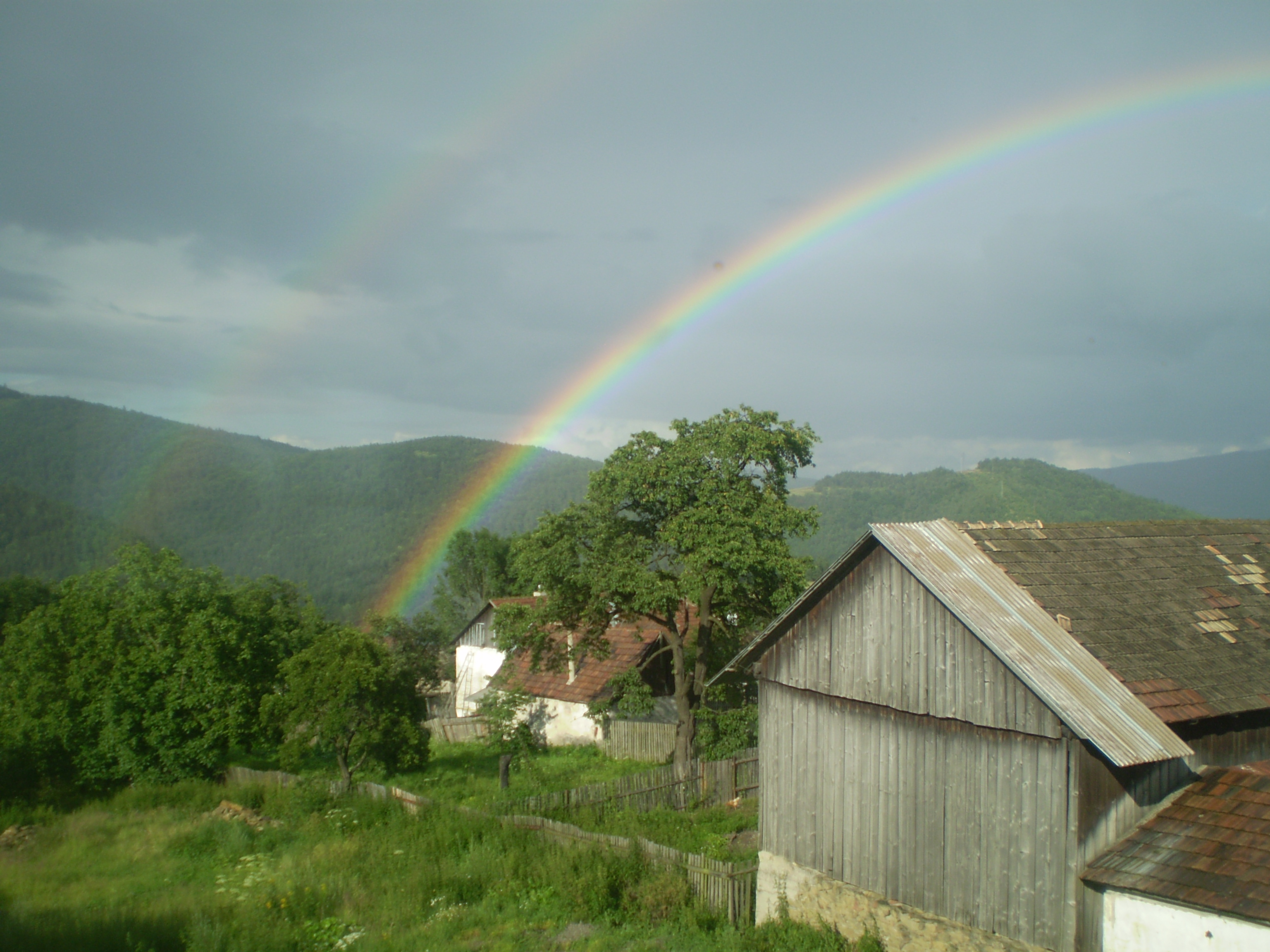

- Flag

- Location of Kaľava in the Košice Region Location of Kaľava in Slovakia
- Coordinates: 48.93°N 20.87°E
- Country: Slovakia
- Region: Košice Region
- District: Spišská Nová Ves District
- First mentioned: 1300

Area
  - Total: 4.43 km^{2} (1.71 sq mi)
- Elevation: 570 m (1,870 ft)

Population (2025)
  - Total: 401
- Time zone: UTC+1 (CET)
  - Summer (DST): UTC+2 (CEST)
- Postal code: 534 1
- Area code: +421 53
- Vehicle registration plate (until 2022): SN
- Website: kalava.sk

Kaľava (Hungarian: Szepeskárolyfalva, until 1899 Kalyava) is a village and municipality in the Spišská Nová Ves District in the Košice Region of central-eastern Slovakia. The village is situated on the southern side of the Branisko mountains.

== History ==
In historical records, the village was first mentioned in 1300.

== Geography ==
The municipality lies at an altitude of 570 metres (1,870 ft) and covers an area of 4.43 km^{2} (1.71 sq mi) (2025).

== Population ==
Population statistic (10 years)
Year	1995	2005	2015	2025
Count	401	443	412	401
Difference		+10.47%	−6.99%	−2.66%

Population statistic
Year	2024	2025
Count	399	401
Difference		+0.50%

It has a population of 401 people (31 December 2025).

=== Ethnicity ===
Census 2021 (1+ %)
Ethnicity	Number	Fraction
Slovak	366	92.65%
Romani	61	15.44%
Not found out	17	4.3%
Total	395	

In year 2021 was 395 people by ethnicity 366 as Slovak, 61 as Romani and 17 as Not found out.

Note on population: The difference values of population numbers in the table "Population statistic" and in the sections "Ethnicity" & "Religion" is caused by the use of various statistical methods.

=== Religion ===
Census 2021 (1+ %)
Religion	Number	Fraction
Roman Catholic Church	303	76.71%
None	58	14.68%
Not found out	19	4.81%
Greek Catholic Church	4	1.01%
Total	395	

In year 2021 was 395 people by religion 303 from Roman Catholic Church, 58 from None, 19 from Not found out, 4 from Greek Catholic Church, 2 from Jehovah's Witnesses, 2 from Christian Congregations in Slovakia, 2 from Other, 2 from Evangelical Church, 1 from Calvinist Church, 1 from Eastern Orthodox Church and 1 from Church of the Brethren.

== Genealogical resources ==
The records for genealogical research are available at the state archive "Statny Archiv in Levoca, Slovakia"

- Roman Catholic church records (births/marriages/deaths): 1722-1918 (parish B)

== See also ==
- List of municipalities and towns in Slovakia
