= Letanovce =

Letanovce Létánfalva
- Municipality
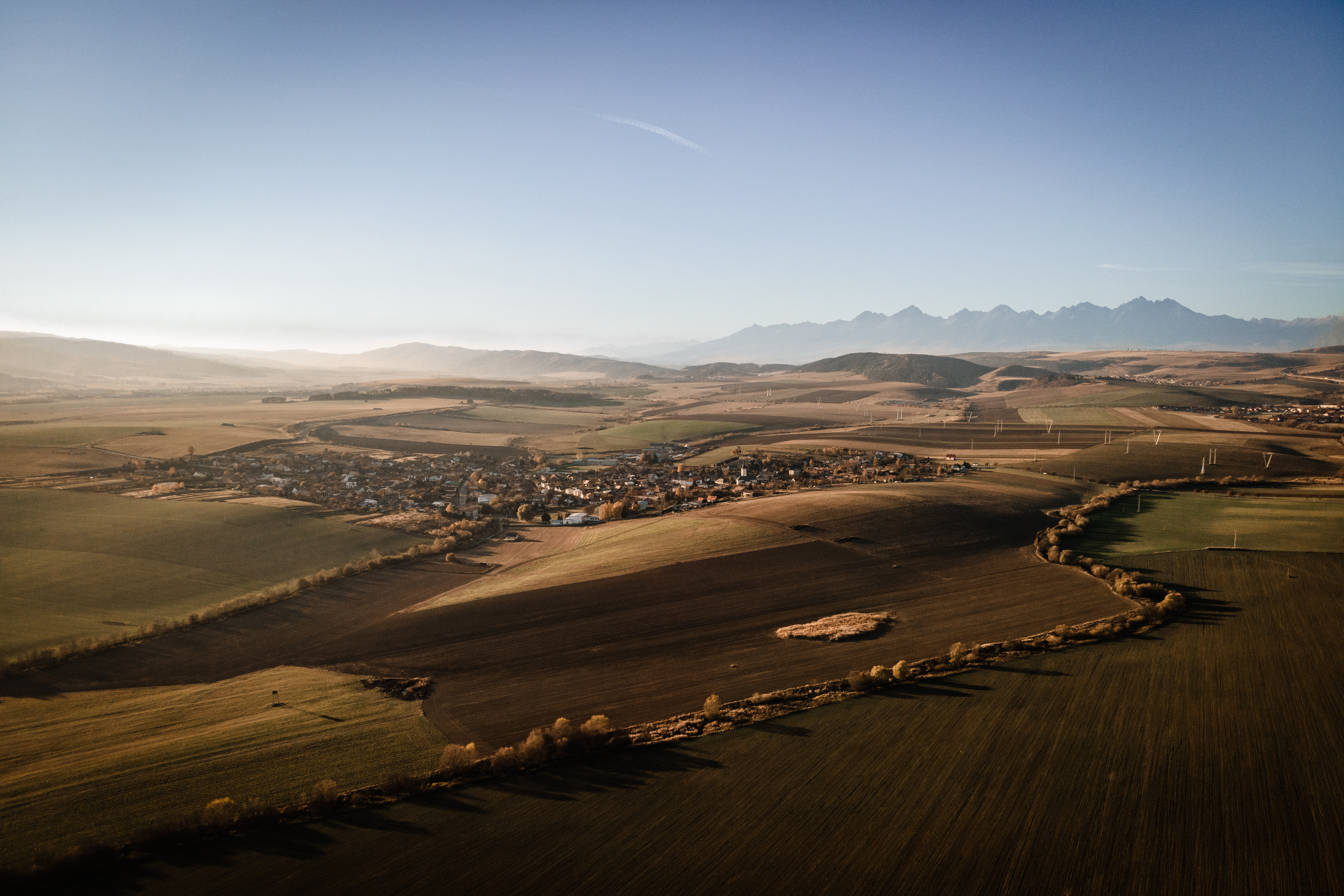
- View of Letanovce towards the High Tatras

- Flag

- Location of Letanovce in the Košice Region Location of Letanovce in Slovakia
- Coordinates: 48.98°N 20.47°E
- Country: Slovakia
- Region: Košice Region
- District: Spišská Nová Ves District
- First mentioned: 1250

Area
  - Total: 21.38 km^{2} (8.25 sq mi)
- Elevation: 508 m (1,667 ft)

Population (2025)
  - Total: 2,353
- Time zone: UTC+1 (CET)
  - Summer (DST): UTC+2 (CEST)
- Postal code: 531 3
- Area code: +421 53
- Vehicle registration plate (until 2022): SN
- Website: www.letanovce.sk

Letanovce (Hungarian: Létánfalva) is a village and municipality in the Spišská Nová Ves District in the Košice Region of central-eastern Slovakia.

In historical records the village was first mentioned in 1250.

The village lies at an altitude of 511 metres and covers an area of 21.38 km^{2}.

As of 2011 it has a population of 2,133 inhabitants; about 70% are Slovaks, 20% are Roma.

== Geography ==
The municipality lies at an altitude of 508 metres (1,667 ft) and covers an area of 21.38 km^{2} (8.25 sq mi) (2025).

== Population ==
Population statistic (10 years)
Year	1995	2005	2015	2025
Count	1752	2096	2286	2353
Difference		+19.63%	+9.06%	+2.93%

Population statistic
Year	2024	2025
Count	2326	2353
Difference		+1.16%

It has a population of 2353 people (31 December 2025).

=== Ethnicity ===
Census 2021 (1+ %)
Ethnicity	Number	Fraction
Slovak	2158	95.27%
Romani	270	11.92%
Not found out	59	2.6%
Total	2265	

In year 2021 was 2265 people by ethnicity 2158 as Slovak, 270 as Romani, 59 as Not found out, 6 as Rusyn, 4 as Czech, 4 as German, 4 as Other, 3 as Russian and 1 as Hungarian.

Note on population: The difference values of population numbers in the table "Population statistic" and in the sections "Ethnicity" & "Religion" is caused by the use of various statistical methods.

The significant portion of the municipality's population consists of the local Roma community. In 2019, they constituted an estimated 45% of the local population, who are living in a settlement outside of the village core.

=== Religion ===
Census 2021 (1+ %)
Religion	Number	Fraction
Roman Catholic Church	1582	69.85%
None	324	14.3%
Christian Congregations in Slovakia	176	7.77%
Not found out	91	4.02%
Jehovah's Witnesses	39	1.72%
Total	2265	

In year 2021 was 2265 people by religion 1582 from Roman Catholic Church, 324 from None, 176 from Christian Congregations in Slovakia, 91 from Not found out, 39 from Jehovah's Witnesses, 16 from Evangelical Church, 11 from Greek Catholic Church, 10 from Apostolic Church, 7 from Other, 5 from Ad hoc movements, 3 from Other and not ascertained christian church and 1 from Eastern Orthodox Church.
