= Spišská Nová Ves District =

Coordinates: 48°56′42″N 20°33′51″E

- District
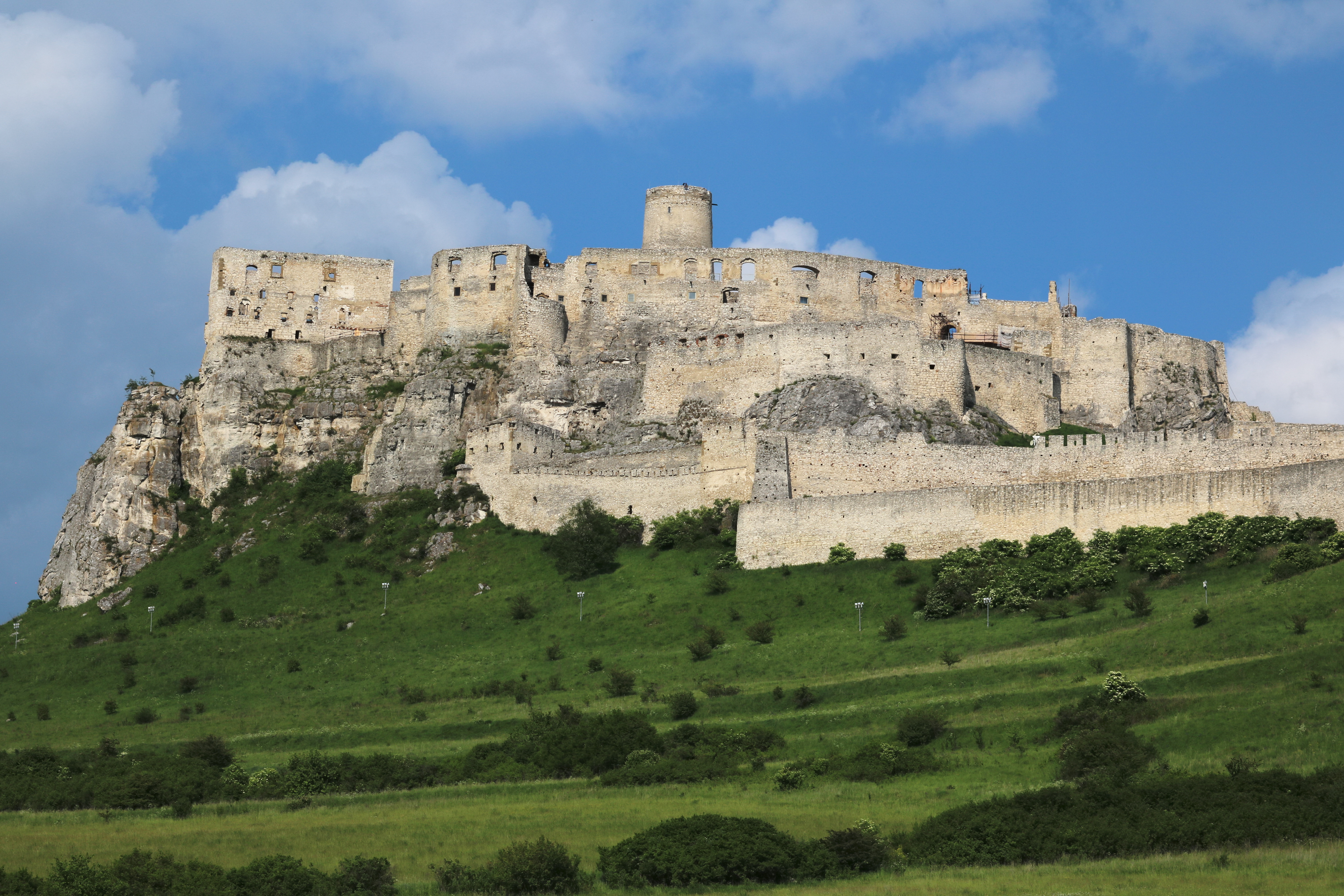
- Country: Slovakia
- Region (kraj): Košice Region
- Seat: Spišská Nová Ves

Area
  - Total: 587.45 km^{2} (226.82 sq mi)

Population (2025)
  - Total: 98,622
- Time zone: UTC+1 (CET)
  - Summer (DST): UTC+2 (CEST)
- Telephone prefix: 053
- Vehicle registration plate (until 2022): SN
- Municipalities: 36

Spišská Nová Ves District (Slovak: okres Spišská Nová Ves) is a district in the Košice Region of eastern Slovakia. The district in its present borders was established in 1996. Administrative, economic and cultural center is its seat Spišská Nová Ves. The district borders Gelnica District and Rožňava District in the south and Poprad District, Prešov District and Levoča District in the north.

== Population ==
Population statistic (10 years)
Year	1995	2005	2015	2025
Count	89,358	95,531	99,166	98,622
Difference		+6.90%	+3.80%	−0.54%

Population statistic
Year	2024	2025
Count	98,670	98,622
Difference		−0.04%

It has a population of 98,622 people (31 December 2025).

Historical population
Year	Pop.	±%
1970	68,851	—
1980	79,142	+14.9%
1991	86,350	+9.1%
2001	93,516	+8.3%
2011	97,593	+4.4%
2021	98,706	+1.1%
Source: Statistical Office of the Slovak Republic

=== Ethnicity ===
Census 2021 (1+ %)
Ethnicity	Number	Fraction
Slovak	90,069	81.16%
Romani	11,742	10.58%
Not found out	6816	6.14%
Total	110,969	

In year 2021 was 110,969 people by ethnicity 90,069 as Slovak, 11,742 as Romani, 6816 as Not found out, 1023 as Rusyn, 375 as Czech, 203 as Other, 126 as German, 115 as Hungarian, 97 as Russian, 92 as Ukrainian, 91 as Polish, 59 as Vietnamese, 21 as English, 18 as Chinese, 17 as Italian, 16 as Austrian, 13 as Moravian, 12 as Irish, 11 as Jewish, 9 as Greek, 9 as Bulgarian, 8 as Serbian, 5 as Albanian, 4 as Silesian, 4 as Romanian, 4 as Canadian, 4 as French, 4 as Croatian and 2 as Turkish.

Note on population: The difference values of population numbers in the table "Population statistic" and in the sections "Ethnicity" & "Religion" is caused by the use of various statistical methods.

=== Religion ===
Census 2021 (1+ %)
Religion	Number	Fraction
Roman Catholic Church	61,655	62.46%
None	19,281	19.53%
Not found out	8351	8.46%
Greek Catholic Church	2828	2.87%
Evangelical Church	1974	2%
Apostolic Church	1178	1.19%
Eastern Orthodox Church	1101	1.12%
Christian Congregations in Slovakia	1009	1.02%
Total	98,706	

In year 2021 was 98,706 people by religion 61,655 from Roman Catholic Church, 19,281 from None, 8351 from Not found out, 2828 from Greek Catholic Church, 1974 from Evangelical Church, 1178 from Apostolic Church, 1101 from Eastern Orthodox Church, 1009 from Christian Congregations in Slovakia, 260 from Jehovah's Witnesses, 223 from Ad hoc movements, 202 from Other and not ascertained christian church, 130 from Other, 129 from Calvinist Church, 95 from Church of the Brethren, 71 from Buddhism, 51 from Paganism and natural spirituality, 39 from Islam, 30 from Seventh-day Adventist Church, 27 from United Methodist Church, 19 from Old Catholic Church, 19 from Church of Jesus Christ of Latter-day Saints, 13 from Baptists Church, 9 from Hinduism, 4 from Jewish community, 3 from New Apostolic Church, 3 from Czechoslovak Hussite Church and 2 from Bahá'i Community.

== Municipalities ==
Municipality	Area [km^{2}]	Population
Arnutovce	2.22	877
Betlanovce	10.12	774
Bystrany	7.81	4,122
Danišovce	4.29	571
Harichovce	10.79	1,888
Hincovce	6.48	261
Hnilčík	22.22	533
Hnilec	27.05	404
Hrabušice	40.88	2,599
Chrasť nad Hornádom	9.38	919
Iliašovce	13.49	999
Jamník	8.14	1,217
Kaľava	4.43	401
Kolinovce	4.68	584
Krompachy	22.83	8,533
Letanovce	21.38	2,353
Lieskovany	1.75	410
Markušovce	18.52	4,910
Matejovce nad Hornádom	3.61	558
Mlynky	25.05	489
Odorín	9.13	1,017
Olcnava	15.21	1,012
Oľšavka	3.01	184
Poráč	18.81	1,007
Rudňany	13.43	5,198
Slatvina	4.40	304
Slovinky	46.45	1,806
Smižany	45.70	8,783
Spišská Nová Ves	66.67	34,023
Spišské Tomášovce	13.62	2,265
Spišské Vlachy	42.21	3,260
Spišský Hrušov	13.06	1,329
Teplička	7.73	1,123
Vítkovce	5.19	673
Vojkovce	7.50	411
Žehra	9.65	2,825

Population and area values are current for year 2025.
