= Rudňany =

Rudňany Ötösbánya
- Municipality
- Flag

- Location of Rudňany in the Košice Region Location of Rudňany in Slovakia
- Coordinates: 48.88°N 20.68°E
- Country: Slovakia
- Region: Košice Region
- District: Spišská Nová Ves District
- First mentioned: 1360

Area
  - Total: 13.43 km^{2} (5.19 sq mi)
- Elevation: 538 m (1,765 ft)

Population (2025)
  - Total: 5,198
- Time zone: UTC+1 (CET)
  - Summer (DST): UTC+2 (CEST)
- Postal code: 532 3
- Area code: +421 53
- Vehicle registration plate (until 2022): SN
- Website: www.rudnany.sk

Rudňany (Hungarian: Ötösbánya) is a village and municipality in the Spišská Nová Ves District in the Košice Region of central-eastern Slovakia.

== History ==
In historical records the village was first mentioned in 1255. By the 13th century, silver and copper were mined in the area. Mercury was a byproduct of mining processes. Around 1895, an iron ore smelting company Vitkovické ironworks, was founded and following the end of the 2nd World War it became the largest of its kind in Slovakia.

== Population ==
Population statistic (10 years)
Year	1995	2005	2015	2025
Count	2937	3497	4336	5198
Difference		+19.06%	+23.99%	+19.88%

Population statistic
Year	2024	2025
Count	5129	5198
Difference		+1.34%

It has a population of 5198 people (31 December 2025).

=== Ethnicity ===
Census 2021 (1+ %)
Ethnicity	Number	Fraction
Slovak	4040	84.35%
Romani	1843	38.48%
Not found out	423	8.83%
Total	4789	

In year 2021 was 4789 people by ethnicity 4040 as Slovak, 1843 as Romani, 423 as Not found out, 12 as Rusyn, 8 as Czech, 5 as Hungarian, 5 as Other, 3 as Ukrainian, 2 as Russian, 1 as Irish, 1 as Serbian, 1 as Polish and 1 as Greek.

Note on population: The difference values of population numbers in the table "Population statistic" and in the sections "Ethnicity" & "Religion" is caused by the use of various statistical methods.

=== Religion ===
Census 2021 (1+ %)
Religion	Number	Fraction
Roman Catholic Church	2455	51.26%
None	1457	30.42%
Not found out	395	8.25%
Christian Congregations in Slovakia	273	5.7%
Greek Catholic Church	82	1.71%
Total	4789	

In year 2021 was 4789 people by religion 2455 from Roman Catholic Church, 1457 from None, 395 from Not found out, 273 from Christian Congregations in Slovakia, 82 from Greek Catholic Church, 31 from Eastern Orthodox Church, 27 from Apostolic Church, 24 from Jehovah's Witnesses, 24 from Evangelical Church, 7 from Other, 5 from Ad hoc movements, 2 from Other and not ascertained christian church, 2 from Buddhism, 1 from Paganism and natural spirituality, 1 from Islam, 1 from Hinduism, 1 from Baptists Church and 1 from Bahá'i Community.

The majority of the municipality's population consists of the members of the local Roma community. In 2019, they constituted an estimated 60% of the population.

== Geography ==
The municipality lies at an altitude of 538 metres (1,765 ft) and covers an area of 13.43 km^{2} (5.19 sq mi) (2025).
