= Slovinky =

Village and municipality in Slovakia

Slovinky Szalánk
- Municipality
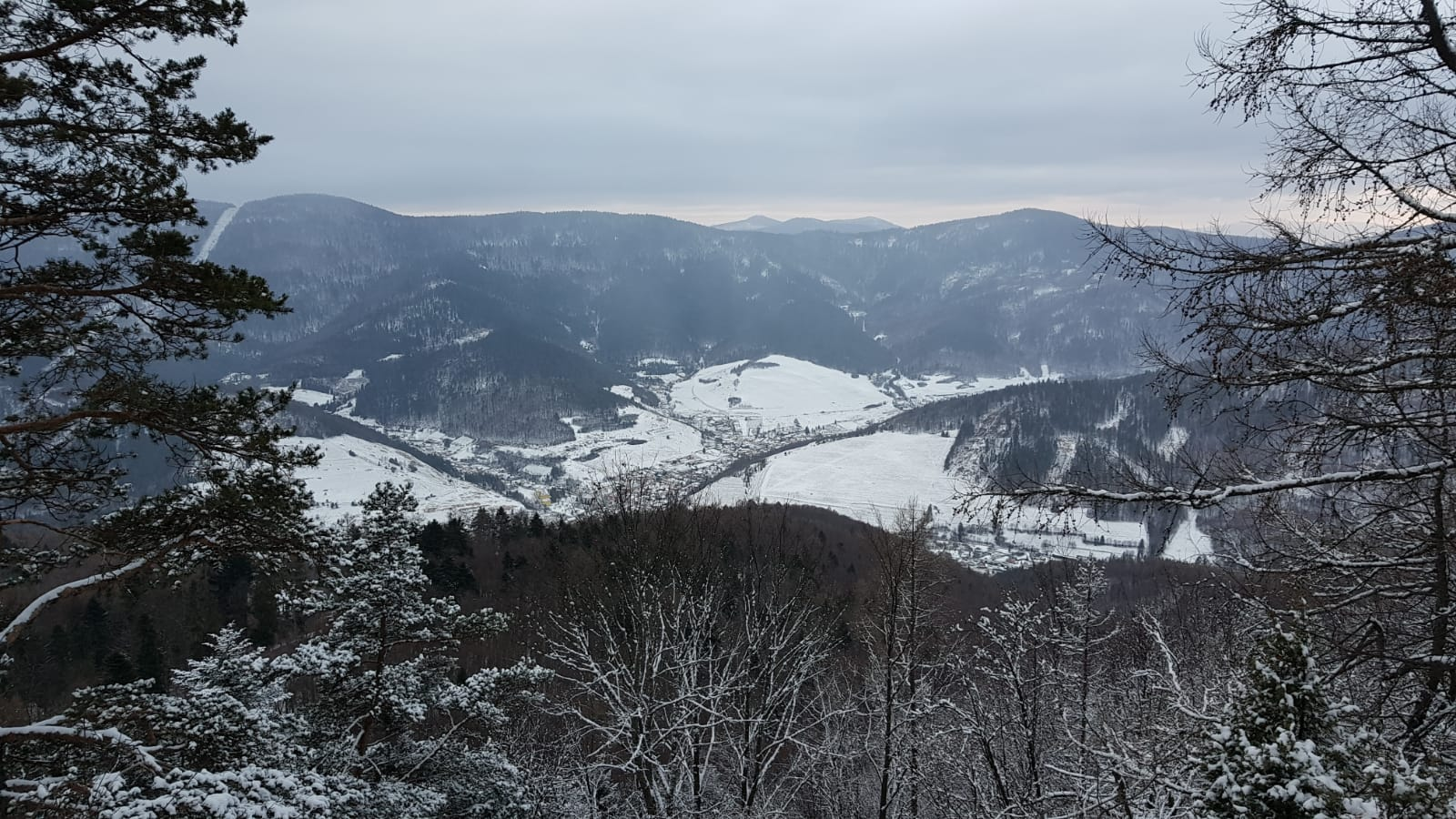

- Flag

- Location of Slovinky in the Košice Region Location of Slovinky in Slovakia
- Coordinates: 48.88°N 20.85°E
- Country: Slovakia
- Region: Košice Region
- District: Spišská Nová Ves District
- First mentioned: 1368

Area
  - Total: 46.45 km^{2} (17.93 sq mi)
- Elevation: 443 m (1,453 ft)

Population (2025)
  - Total: 1,806
- Time zone: UTC+1 (CET)
  - Summer (DST): UTC+2 (CEST)
- Postal code: 534 0
- Area code: +421 53
- Vehicle registration plate (until 2022): SN
- Website: www.obecslovinky.sk

Slovinky (Hungarian: Szalánk) is a village and municipality in the Spišská Nová Ves District in the Košice Region of central-eastern Slovakia. In 2011, it had a population of 1,911 inhabitants.

== History ==
In historical records the village was first mentioned in 1368.

== Geography ==
The municipality lies at an altitude of 443 metres (1,453 ft) and covers an area of 46.45 km^{2} (17.93 sq mi) (2025).

== Population ==
Population statistic (10 years)
Year	1995	2005	2015	2025
Count	1785	1871	1891	1806
Difference		+4.81%	+1.06%	−4.49%

Population statistic
Year	2024	2025
Count	1800	1806
Difference		+0.33%

It has a population of 1806 people (31 December 2025).

=== Ethnicity ===
Census 2021 (1+ %)
Ethnicity	Number	Fraction
Slovak	1668	92.97%
Rusyn	188	10.47%
Romani	67	3.73%
Not found out	62	3.45%
Total	1794	

In year 2021 was 1794 people by ethnicity 1668 as Slovak, 188 as Rusyn, 67 as Romani, 62 as Not found out, 12 as Czech, 6 as Other, 4 as Ukrainian, 3 as Russian, 2 as Italian, 1 as Polish, 1 as German, 1 as Hungarian and 1 as English.

Note on population: The difference values of population numbers in the table "Population statistic" and in the sections "Ethnicity" & "Religion" is caused by the use of various statistical methods.

=== Religion ===
Census 2021 (1+ %)
Religion	Number	Fraction
Eastern Orthodox Church	625	34.84%
Roman Catholic Church	514	28.65%
Greek Catholic Church	351	19.57%
None	224	12.49%
Not found out	54	3.01%
Total	1794	

In year 2021 was 1794 people by religion 625 from Eastern Orthodox Church, 514 from Roman Catholic Church, 351 from Greek Catholic Church, 224 from None, 54 from Not found out, 13 from Evangelical Church, 3 from Calvinist Church, 2 from Other and not ascertained christian church, 2 from Christian Congregations in Slovakia, 2 from Ad hoc movements, 1 from Old Catholic Church, 1 from Paganism and natural spirituality, 1 from Seventh-day Adventist Church and 1 from Buddhism.
