= Chrasť nad Hornádom =

Village and municipality in Slovakia

- Municipality
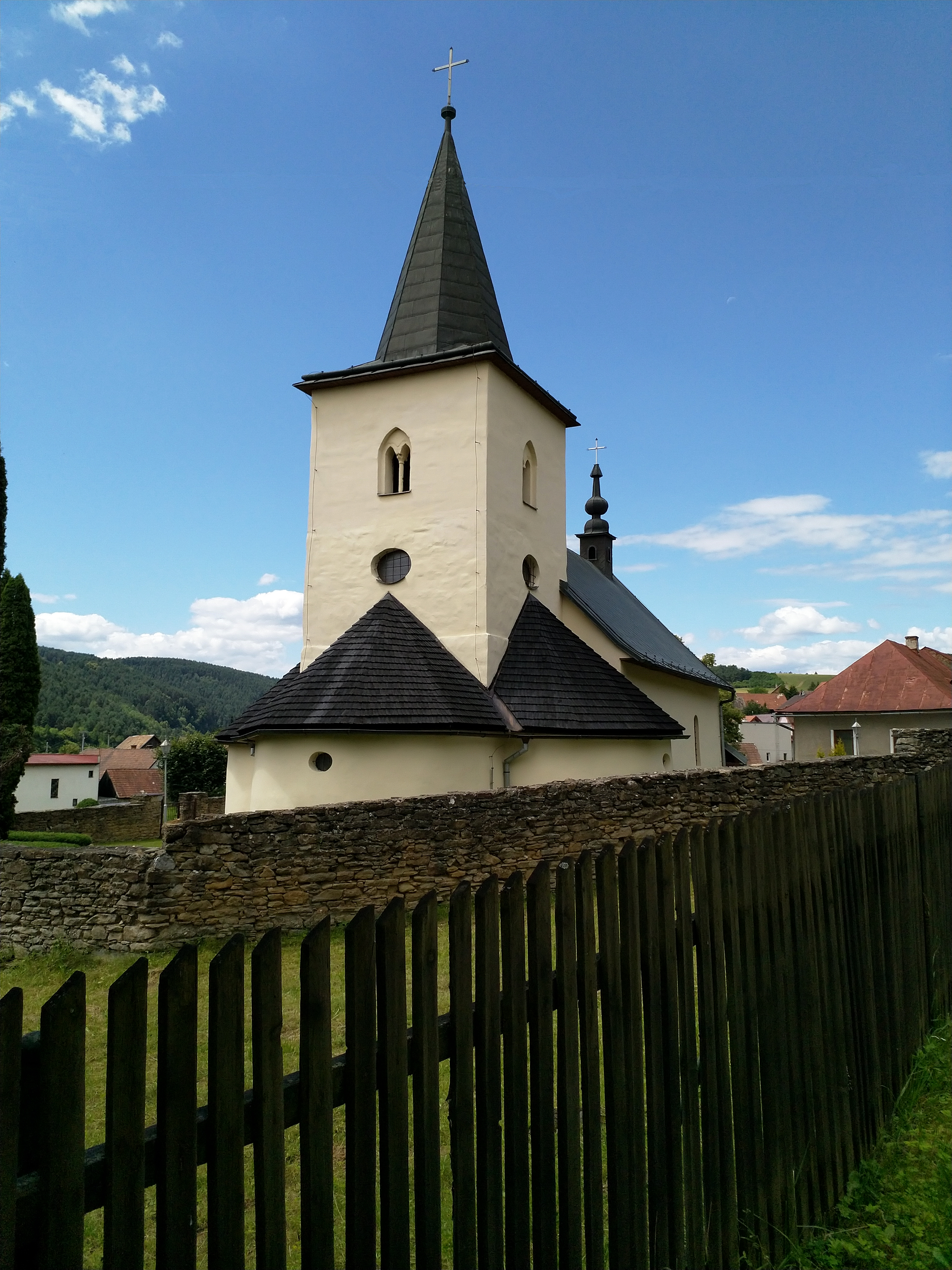
- Church of Holy Trinity

- Flag

- Location of Chrasť nad Hornádom in the Košice Region Location of Chrasť nad Hornádom in Slovakia
- Coordinates: 48.93°N 20.70°E
- Country: Slovakia
- Region: Košice Region
- District: Spišská Nová Ves District
- First mentioned: 1280

Area
  - Total: 9.38 km^{2} (3.62 sq mi)
- Elevation: 424 m (1,391 ft)

Population (2025)
  - Total: 919
- Time zone: UTC+1 (CET)
  - Summer (DST): UTC+2 (CEST)
- Postal code: 536 3
- Area code: +421 53
- Vehicle registration plate (until 2022): SN
- Website: www.chrastnadhornadom.sk

Chrasť nad Hornádom (Hungarian: Haraszt) is a village and municipality in the Spišská Nová Ves District in the Košice Region of central-eastern Slovakia.

== Etymology ==
Chrasť - a dense bush, brushwood (Slovak from Proto-Slavic chvorstь). Horost (1280).

== History ==
In historical records the village was first mentioned in 1280.

== Geography ==
The municipality lies at an altitude of 424 metres (1,391 ft) and covers an area of 9.38 km^{2} (3.62 sq mi) (2025).

== Population ==
Population statistic (10 years)
Year	1995	2005	2015	2025
Count	682	775	887	919
Difference		+13.63%	+14.45%	+3.60%

Population statistic
Year	2024	2025
Count	928	919
Difference		−0.96%

It has a population of 919 people (31 December 2025).

=== Ethnicity ===
Census 2021 (1+ %)
Ethnicity	Number	Fraction
Slovak	826	91.37%
Romani	185	20.46%
Not found out	74	8.18%
Total	904	

In year 2021 was 904 people by ethnicity 826 as Slovak, 185 as Romani, 74 as Not found out, 3 as Rusyn and 2 as Czech.

Note on population: The difference values of population numbers in the table "Population statistic" and in the sections "Ethnicity" & "Religion" is caused by the use of various statistical methods.

=== Religion ===
Census 2021 (1+ %)
Religion	Number	Fraction
Roman Catholic Church	786	86.95%
Not found out	54	5.97%
None	31	3.43%
Greek Catholic Church	17	1.88%
Total	904	

In year 2021 was 904 people by religion 786 from Roman Catholic Church, 54 from Not found out, 31 from None, 17 from Greek Catholic Church, 4 from Evangelical Church, 4 from Church of the Brethren, 2 from Eastern Orthodox Church, 2 from Jehovah's Witnesses, 2 from Other, 1 from Other and not ascertained christian church and 1 from Christian Congregations in Slovakia.

== Genealogical resources ==
The records for genealogical research are available at the state archive "Statny Archiv in Levoca, Slovakia"

- Roman Catholic church records (births/marriages/deaths): 1713-1897 (parish A)

== See also ==
- List of municipalities and towns in Slovakia
