= Olcnava =

Village and municipality in Slovakia

Olcnava Detrefalva
- Municipality
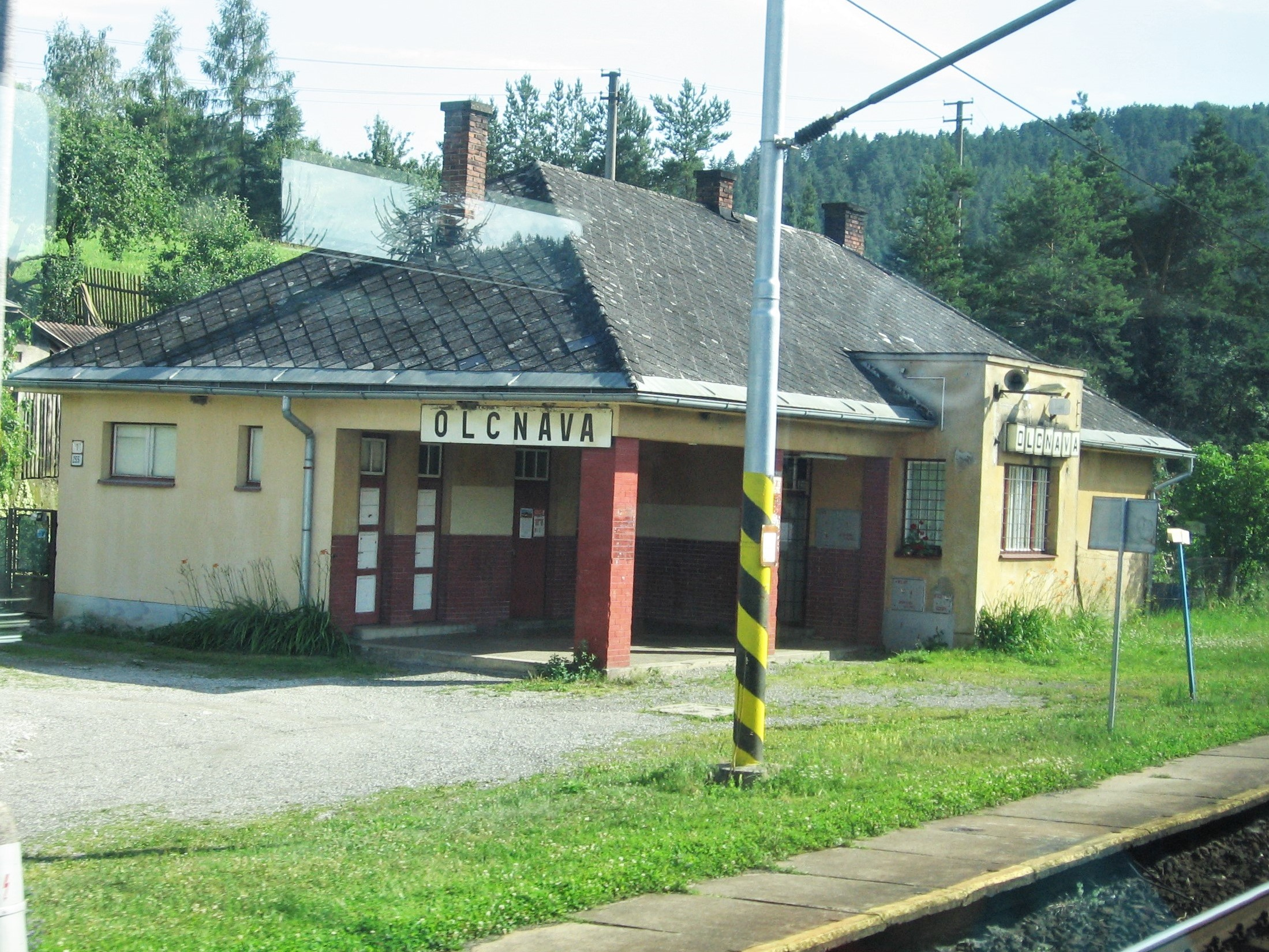

- Flag

- Location of Olcnava in the Košice Region Location of Olcnava in Slovakia
- Coordinates: 48.93°N 20.75°E
- Country: Slovakia
- Region: Košice Region
- District: Spišská Nová Ves District
- First mentioned: 1312

Area
  - Total: 15.21 km^{2} (5.87 sq mi)
- Elevation: 411 m (1,348 ft)

Population (2025)
  - Total: 1,012
- Time zone: UTC+1 (CET)
  - Summer (DST): UTC+2 (CEST)
- Postal code: 536 1
- Area code: +421 53
- Vehicle registration plate (until 2022): SN
- Website: olcnava.sk

Olcnava (Hungarian: Detrefalva) is a village and municipality in the Spišská Nová Ves District in the Košice Region of central-eastern Slovakia.

== History ==
In historical records the village was first mentioned in 1312.

== Geography ==
The municipality lies at an altitude of 411 metres (1,348 ft) and covers an area of 15.21 km^{2} (5.87 sq mi) (2025).

== Population ==
Population statistic (10 years)
Year	1995	2005	2015	2025
Count	882	973	1057	1012
Difference		+10.31%	+8.63%	−4.25%

Population statistic
Year	2024	2025
Count	1015	1012
Difference		−0.29%

It has a population of 1012 people (31 December 2025).

=== Ethnicity ===
Census 2021 (1+ %)
Ethnicity	Number	Fraction
Slovak	971	93.36%
Not found out	68	6.53%
Romani	18	1.73%
Total	1040	

In year 2021 was 1040 people by ethnicity 971 as Slovak, 68 as Not found out, 18 as Romani, 10 as Rusyn, 4 as Other, 2 as Czech, 2 as Polish, 2 as English, 1 as Ukrainian, 1 as Serbian, 1 as German and 1 as Hungarian.

Note on population: The difference values of population numbers in the table "Population statistic" and in the sections "Ethnicity" & "Religion" is caused by the use of various statistical methods.

=== Religion ===
Census 2021 (1+ %)
Religion	Number	Fraction
Roman Catholic Church	820	78.85%
Not found out	92	8.85%
None	84	8.08%
Greek Catholic Church	17	1.63%
Evangelical Church	12	1.15%
Total	1040	

In year 2021 was 1040 people by religion 820 from Roman Catholic Church, 92 from Not found out, 84 from None, 17 from Greek Catholic Church, 12 from Evangelical Church, 4 from Ad hoc movements, 3 from Calvinist Church, 3 from Eastern Orthodox Church, 3 from Jehovah's Witnesses, 1 from Other and 1 from Baptists Church.
