= Jamník, Spišská Nová Ves District =

Jamník Szepesárki
- Municipality
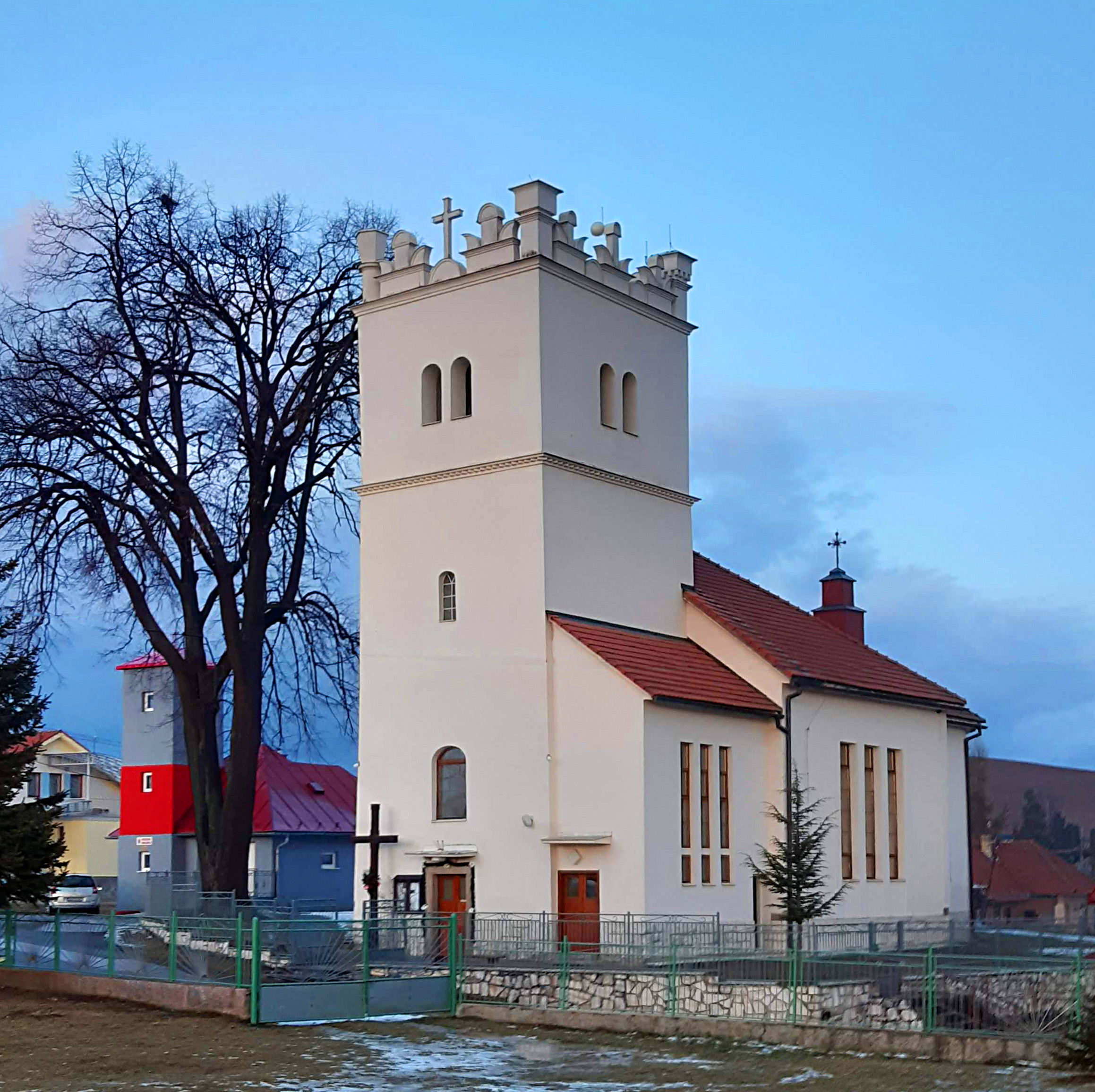
- Church of St. Bartolomew

- Flag

- Location of Jamník in the Košice Region Location of Jamník in Slovakia
- Coordinates: 48.94°N 20.66°E
- Country: Slovakia
- Region: Košice Region
- District: Spišská Nová Ves District
- First mentioned: 1277

Area
  - Total: 8.14 km^{2} (3.14 sq mi)
- Elevation: 459 m (1,506 ft)

Population (2025)
  - Total: 1,217
- Time zone: UTC+1 (CET)
  - Summer (DST): UTC+2 (CEST)
- Postal code: 532 2
- Area code: +421 53
- Vehicle registration plate (until 2022): SN
- Website: www.obecjamnik.sk

Jamník (Hungarian: Szepesárki) is a village and municipality in the Spišská Nová Ves District in the Košice Region of east central Slovakia.

== History ==
In historical records the village was first mentioned in 1277.
Old and foreign name of village: 1277 Yempnik, 1287 Jemnuk, 1327 Jemnik, 1773 Jamník
German name: Jamnik
Hungary name: Szepesárki

== Geography ==
The municipality lies at an altitude of 459 metres (1,506 ft) and covers an area of 8.14 km^{2} (3.14 sq mi) (2025). Jamník is 7 km (4.3 mi) east of Spišská Nová Ves on highway 536.The village is located in the southern part of the Hornád basin in the valley of the Jamníček stream. The district town Spišská Nová Ves is 10 km away from the village and the county town Košice is approx. 60 km southeast of the village. The village's cadastre covers an area of approx. 814 ha (8,14 km2).

== Population ==
Population statistic (10 years)
Year	1995	2005	2015	2025
Count	1059	1074	1185	1217
Difference		+1.41%	+10.33%	+2.70%

Population statistic
Year	2024	2025
Count	1202	1217
Difference		+1.24%

It has a population of 1217 people (31 December 2025).

=== Ethnicity ===
Census 2021 (1+ %)
Ethnicity	Number	Fraction
Slovak	1171	99.32%
Total	1179	

In year 2021 was 1179 people by ethnicity 1171 as Slovak, 10 as Not found out, 6 as Rusyn, 1 as Czech, 1 as Irish and 1 as Russian.

Note on population: The difference values of population numbers in the table "Population statistic" and in the sections "Ethnicity" & "Religion" is caused by the use of various statistical methods.

=== Religion ===
Census 2021 (1+ %)
Religion	Number	Fraction
Roman Catholic Church	1106	93.81%
None	49	4.16%
Total	1179	

In year 2021 was 1179 people by religion 1106 from Roman Catholic Church, 49 from None, 10 from Greek Catholic Church, 7 from Not found out, 3 from Christian Congregations in Slovakia, 2 from Evangelical Church, 1 from Old Catholic Church and 1 from Other.

== Genealogical resources ==
The records for genealogical research are available at the state archive "Statny Archiv in Levoca, Slovakia"

- Roman Catholic church records (births/marriages/deaths): 1687-1895 (parish B)

== Sights ==
Church of St. Bartolomew, apostle was originally gothic from start of 14th century, in 15th century coped on a middle pillar. Tower with squared footprint was in 17th century renaissance rebuilt and terminated with attic. In 1940, vaulting broke down and damaged building was replaced by modern new building from 1951.
Old school is old building, where were learning children from Jamník to year 1992. Now is the building serving as a center of catholic youth.

== Economy and infrastructure ==
Parish office

- branch of Roman Catholic office Odorín

Education

- Kindergarten
- Primary school

== See also ==
- List of municipalities and towns in Slovakia
