= Danišovce =

Village and municipality in Slovakia

Danišovce Dénesfalva
- Municipality
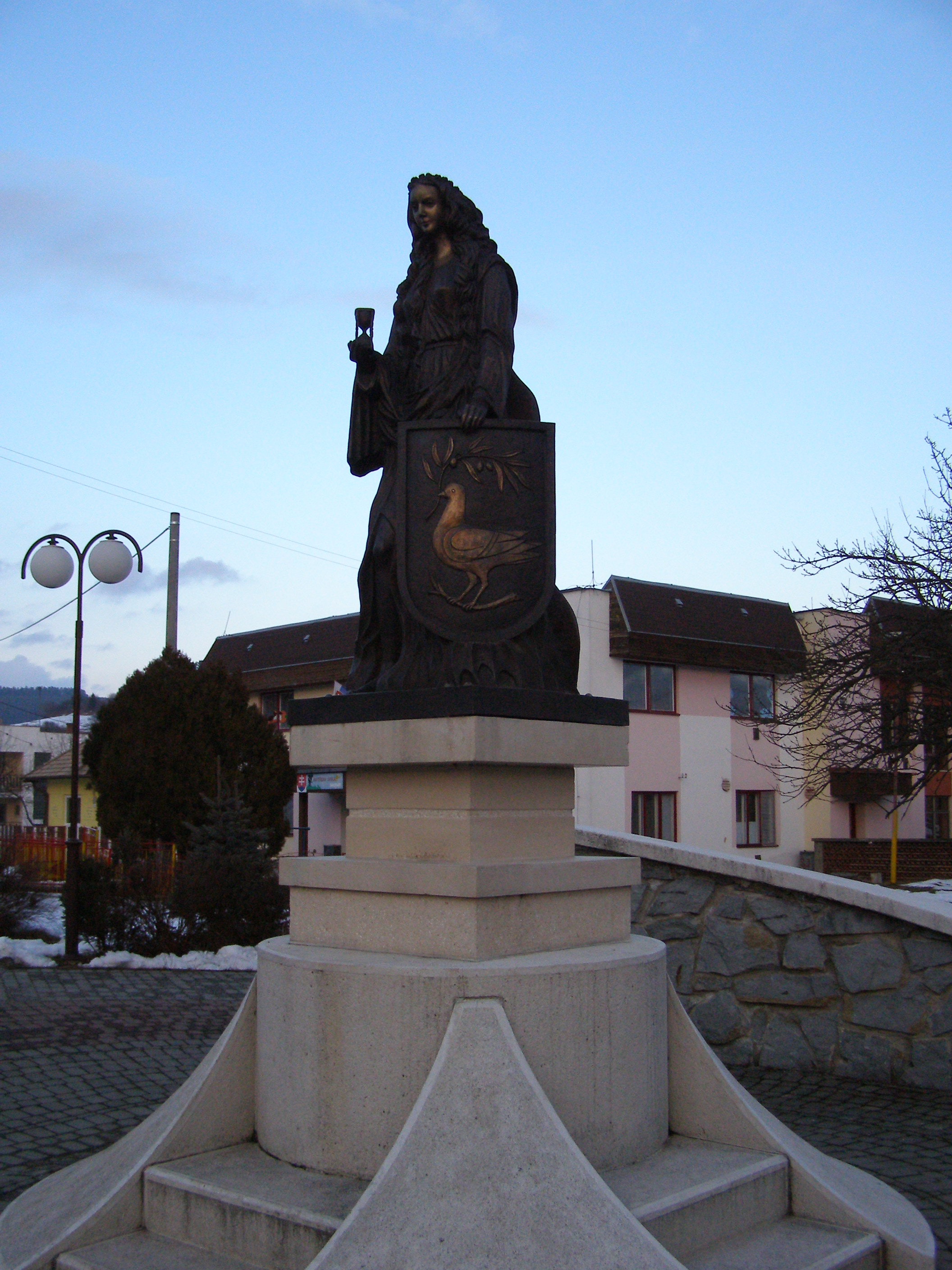

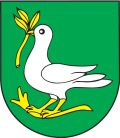
- Flag Coat of arms

- Location of Danišovce in the Košice Region Location of Danišovce in Slovakia
- Coordinates: 48.95°N 20.63°E
- Country: Slovakia
- Region: Košice Region
- District: Spišská Nová Ves District
- First mentioned: 1287

Area
  - Total: 4.29 km^{2} (1.66 sq mi)
- Elevation: 457 m (1,499 ft)

Population (2025)
  - Total: 571
- Time zone: UTC+1 (CET)
  - Summer (DST): UTC+2 (CEST)
- Postal code: 537 5
- Area code: +421 53
- Vehicle registration plate (until 2022): SN
- Website: obecdanisovce.eu

Danišovce (Hungarian: Dénesfalva) is a village and municipality in the Spišská Nová Ves District in the Košice Region of central-eastern Slovakia.

== History ==
In historical records the village was first mentioned in 1287.

== Geography ==
The municipality lies at an altitude of 457 metres (1,499 ft) and covers an area of 4.29 km^{2} (1.66 sq mi) (2025).

== Population ==
Population statistic (10 years)
Year	1995	2005	2015	2025
Count	328	457	565	571
Difference		+39.32%	+23.63%	+1.06%

Population statistic
Year	2024	2025
Count	558	571
Difference		+2.32%

It has a population of 571 people (31 December 2025).

=== Ethnicity ===
Census 2021 (1+ %)
Ethnicity	Number	Fraction
Slovak	559	97.21%
Not found out	10	1.73%
Rusyn	8	1.39%
Total	575	

In year 2021 was 575 people by ethnicity 559 as Slovak, 10 as Not found out, 8 as Rusyn, 3 as Ukrainian, 3 as Other, 3 as English, 2 as Russian, 2 as German and 1 as Czech.

Note on population: The difference values of population numbers in the table "Population statistic" and in the sections "Ethnicity" & "Religion" is caused by the use of various statistical methods.

=== Religion ===
Census 2021 (1+ %)
Religion	Number	Fraction
Roman Catholic Church	519	90.26%
None	33	5.74%
Not found out	9	1.57%
Greek Catholic Church	9	1.57%
Total	575	

In year 2021 was 575 people by religion 519 from Roman Catholic Church, 33 from None, 9 from Not found out, 9 from Greek Catholic Church, 2 from Ad hoc movements, 1 from Calvinist Church, 1 from Other and 1 from Evangelical Church.

== Genealogical resources ==
The records for genealogical research are available at the state archive "Statny Archiv in Levoca, Slovakia"

- Roman Catholic church records (births/marriages/deaths): 1754-1895 (parish B)

== See also ==
- List of municipalities and towns in Slovakia
