= Hincovce =

Village and municipality in Slovakia

Hincovce Szepesnádasd
- Municipality
- Flag

- Location of Hincovce in the Košice Region Location of Hincovce in Slovakia
- Coordinates: 48.97°N 20.73°E
- Country: Slovakia
- Region: Košice Region
- District: Spišská Nová Ves District
- First mentioned: 1320

Area
  - Total: 6.48 km^{2} (2.50 sq mi)
- Elevation: 443 m (1,453 ft)

Population (2025)
  - Total: 261
- Time zone: UTC+1 (CET)
  - Summer (DST): UTC+2 (CEST)
- Postal code: 536 3
- Area code: +421 53
- Vehicle registration plate (until 2022): SN
- Website: obechincovce.sk

Hincovce (Hungarian: Szepesnádasd) is a village and municipality in the Spišská Nová Ves District in the Košice Region of central-eastern Slovakia.

== History ==
In historical records the village was first mentioned in 1320.

== Geography ==
The municipality lies at an altitude of 443 metres (1,453 ft) and covers an area of 6.48 km^{2} (2.50 sq mi) (2025).

== Population ==
Population statistic (10 years)
Year	1995	2005	2015	2025
Count	207	205	226	261
Difference		−0.96%	+10.24%	+15.48%

Population statistic
Year	2024	2025
Count	266	261
Difference		−1.87%

It has a population of 261 people (31 December 2025).

=== Ethnicity ===
Census 2021 (1+ %)
Ethnicity	Number	Fraction
Slovak	242	95.65%
Not found out	9	3.55%
Polish	4	1.58%
Total	253	

In year 2021 was 253 people by ethnicity 242 as Slovak, 9 as Not found out, 4 as Polish and 1 as Czech.

Note on population: The difference values of population numbers in the table "Population statistic" and in the sections "Ethnicity" & "Religion" is caused by the use of various statistical methods.

=== Religion ===
Census 2021 (1+ %)
Religion	Number	Fraction
Roman Catholic Church	231	91.3%
Not found out	7	2.77%
None	7	2.77%
Evangelical Church	4	1.58%
Total	253	

In year 2021 was 253 people by religion 231 from Roman Catholic Church, 7 from Not found out, 7 from None, 4 from Evangelical Church, 2 from Greek Catholic Church, 1 from Eastern Orthodox Church and 1 from Other and not ascertained christian church.

== Genealogical resources ==
The records for genealogical research are available at the state archive "Statny Archiv in Levoca, Slovakia"

- Roman Catholic church records (births/marriages/deaths): 1779-1896 (parish B)

== See also ==
- List of municipalities and towns in Slovakia
