= Arnutovce =

Village and municipality in Slovakia

Arnutovce Arnótfalva
- Municipality
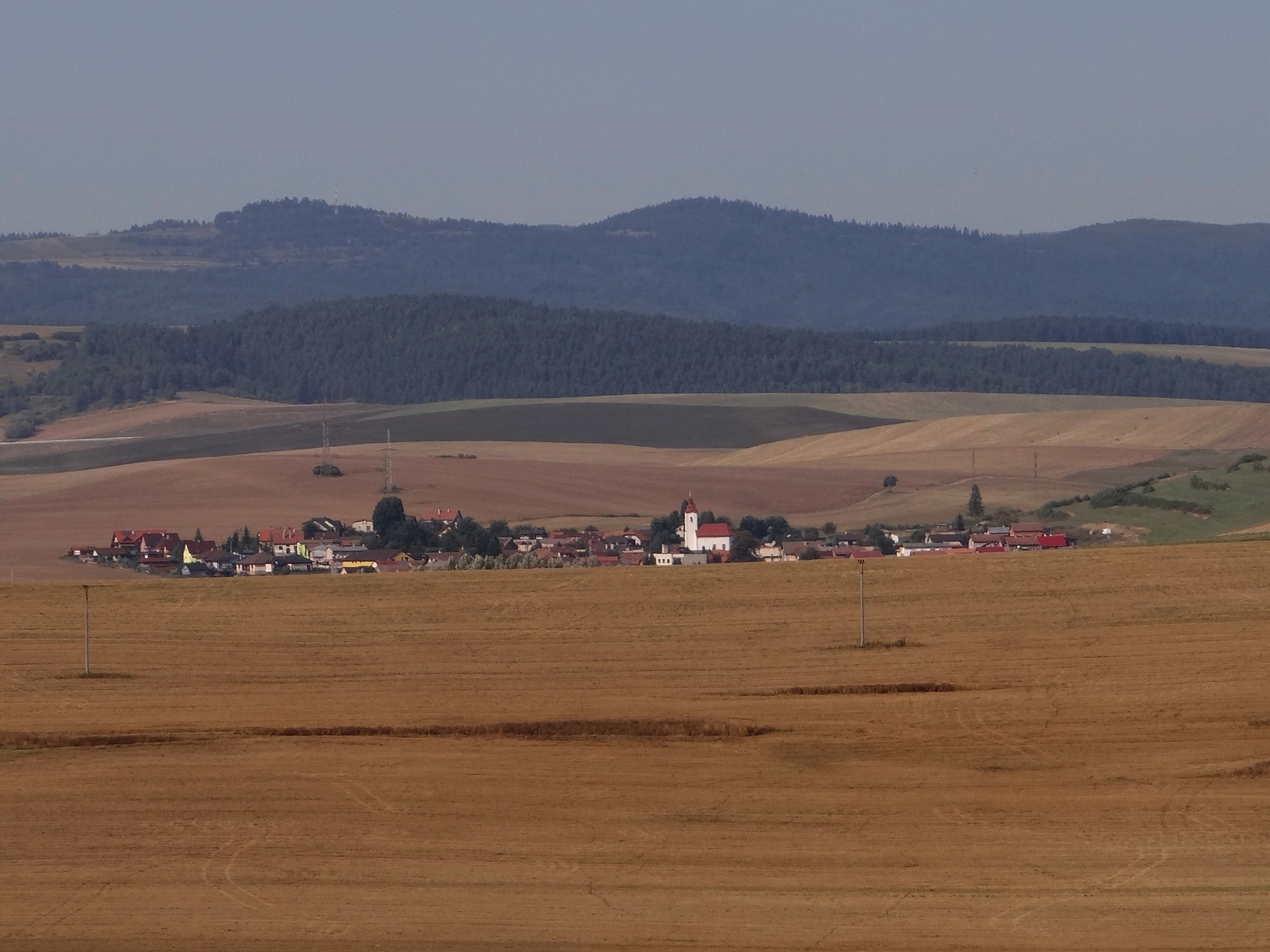

- Flag

- Location of Arnutovce in the Košice Region Location of Arnutovce in Slovakia
- Coordinates: 48.98°N 20.50°E
- Country: Slovakia
- Region: Košice Region
- District: Spišská Nová Ves District
- First mentioned: 1317

Area
  - Total: 2.22 km^{2} (0.86 sq mi)
- Elevation: 520 m (1,710 ft)

Population (2025)
  - Total: 877
- Time zone: UTC+1 (CET)
  - Summer (DST): UTC+2 (CEST)
- Postal code: 531 1
- Area code: +421 53
- Vehicle registration plate (until 2022): SN
- Website: obecarnutovce.sk

Arnutovce (Hungarian: Arnótfalva) is a village and municipality in the Spišská Nová Ves District in the Košice Region of central-eastern Slovakia.

== History ==
In historical records the village was first mentioned in 1317.

== Geography ==
The municipality lies at an altitude of 520 metres (1,710 ft) and covers an area of 2.22 km^{2} (0.86 sq mi) (2025).

== Population ==
Population statistic (10 years)
Year	1995	2005	2015	2025
Count	475	616	769	877
Difference		+29.68%	+24.83%	+14.04%

Population statistic
Year	2024	2025
Count	867	877
Difference		+1.15%

It has a population of 877 people (31 December 2025).

=== Ethnicity ===
Census 2021 (1+ %)
Ethnicity	Number	Fraction
Slovak	685	84.35%
Romani	214	26.35%
Not found out	80	9.85%
Total	812	

In year 2021 was 812 people by ethnicity 685 as Slovak, 214 as Romani, 80 as Not found out, 4 as Polish, 3 as Rusyn, 1 as German and 1 as Hungarian.

Note on population: The difference values of population numbers in the table "Population statistic" and in the sections "Ethnicity" & "Religion" is caused by the use of various statistical methods.

=== Religion ===
Census 2021 (1+ %)
Religion	Number	Fraction
Roman Catholic Church	670	82.51%
Not found out	83	10.22%
None	35	4.31%
Greek Catholic Church	12	1.48%
Total	812	

In year 2021 was 812 people by religion 670 from Roman Catholic Church, 83 from Not found out, 35 from None, 12 from Greek Catholic Church, 6 from Evangelical Church, 3 from Christian Congregations in Slovakia, 1 from Eastern Orthodox Church, 1 from Paganism and natural spirituality and 1 from Other.

== Facilities ==
The village has a public library and a football pitch.

== Genealogical resources ==
The records for genealogical research are available at the Spiš archive in Levoča (Slovak: Spišský archív v Levoči).

- Roman Catholic church records (births/marriages/deaths): 1760-1901
- Greek Catholic church records (births/marriages/deaths): 1784-1895
- Census records 1869 of Arnutovce are available at the state archive.

== See also ==
- List of municipalities and towns in Slovakia
