= Slatvina =

Slatvina Szlatvin
- Municipality
- Flag

- Location of Slatvina in the Košice Region Location of Slatvina in Slovakia
- Coordinates: 48.97°N 20.85°E
- Country: Slovakia
- Region: Košice Region
- District: Spišská Nová Ves District
- First mentioned: 1246

Area
  - Total: 4.40 km^{2} (1.70 sq mi)
- Elevation: 460 m (1,510 ft)

Population (2025)
  - Total: 304
- Time zone: UTC+1 (CET)
  - Summer (DST): UTC+2 (CEST)
- Postal code: 536 1
- Area code: +421 53
- Vehicle registration plate (until 2022): SN
- Website: slatvina.eu

Slatvina (Hungarian: Szlatvin) is a village and municipality in the Spišská Nová Ves District in the Košice Region of central-eastern Slovakia. It has a population of 334 inhabitants as of 2017.

== History ==
In historical records the village was first mentioned in 1246 as a zek and was originally a place of border guards of the emerging Hungarian state. Therefore, the local nobles wore the title de Szék. It was not until 1525 that the Slavic name form emerged as Szlatwin. Before that year, the village was owned by the Zsigray family, after which it came under the dominion of the Spiš Castle and thus under landlords such as Zápolya, Thurzo and Csáky. In 1828 there were 29 houses and 218 inhabitants whose main source of income was agriculture.

== Geography ==
The municipality lies at an altitude of 460 metres (1,510 ft) and covers an area of 4.40 km^{2} (1.70 sq mi) (2025).

== Population ==
Population statistic (10 years)
Year	1995	2005	2015	2025
Count	256	300	331	304
Difference		+17.18%	+10.33%	−8.15%

Population statistic
Year	2024	2025
Count	307	304
Difference		−0.97%

It has a population of 304 people (31 December 2025).

=== Ethnicity ===
Census 2021 (1+ %)
Ethnicity	Number	Fraction
Slovak	306	99.35%
Total	308	

In year 2021 was 308 people by ethnicity 306 as Slovak, 1 as Czech, 1 as Not found out and 1 as Hungarian.

Note on population: The difference values of population numbers in the table "Population statistic" and in the sections "Ethnicity" & "Religion" is caused by the use of various statistical methods.

=== Religion ===
Census 2021 (1+ %)
Religion	Number	Fraction
Roman Catholic Church	280	90.91%
None	21	6.82%
Total	308	

In year 2021 was 308 people by religion 280 from Roman Catholic Church, 21 from None, 1 from Eastern Orthodox Church, 1 from Not found out, 1 from Christian Congregations in Slovakia, 1 from Greek Catholic Church, 1 from Evangelical Church, 1 from Buddhism and 1 from Ad hoc movements.
