= Spišské Tomášovce =

Spišské Tomášovce Szepestamásfalva
- Municipality
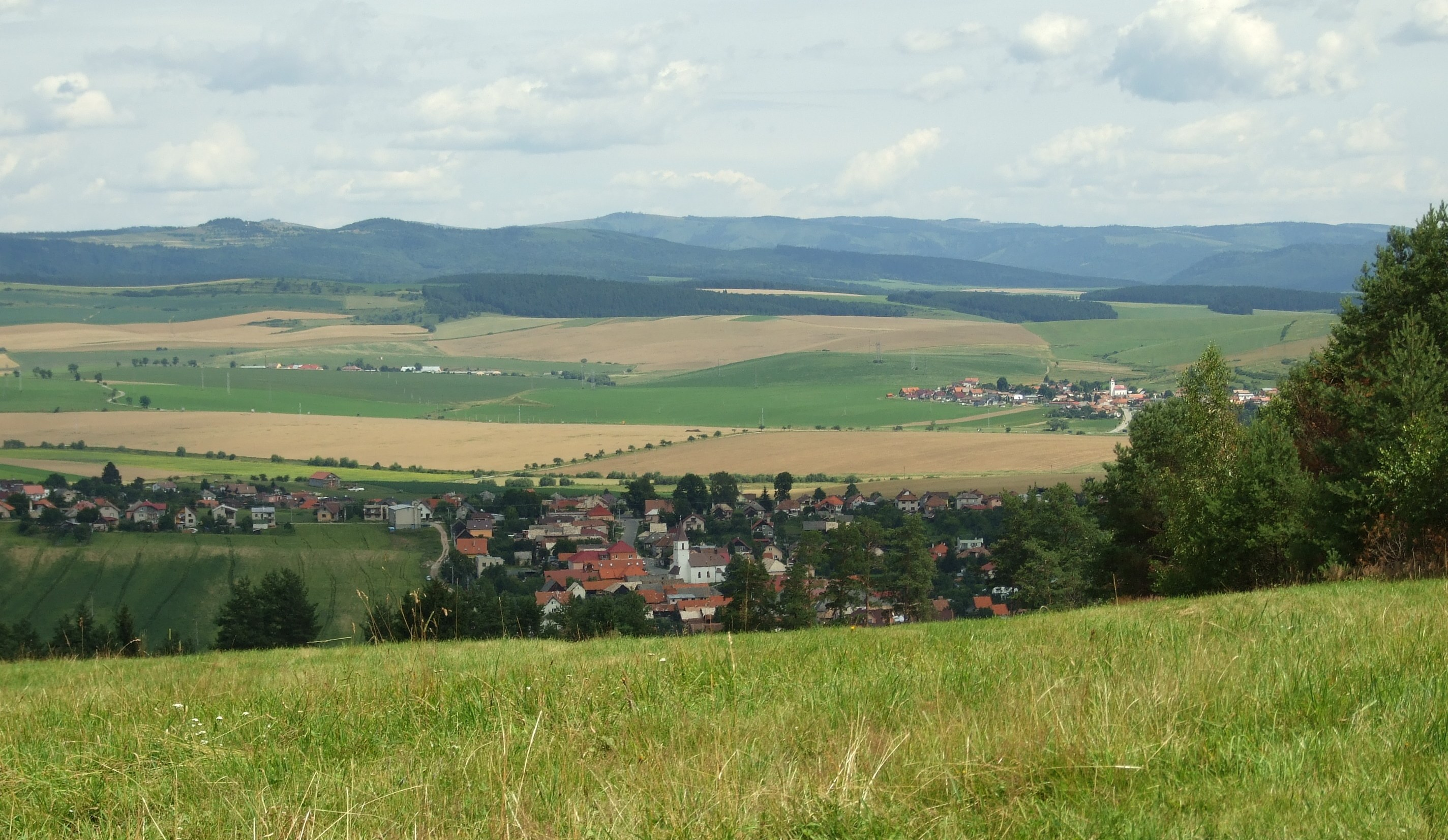

- Flag

- Location of Spišské Tomášovce in the Košice Region Location of Spišské Tomášovce in Slovakia
- Coordinates: 48.95°N 20.47°E
- Country: Slovakia
- Region: Košice Region
- District: Spišská Nová Ves District
- First mentioned: 1229

Area
  - Total: 13.62 km^{2} (5.26 sq mi)
- Elevation: 519 m (1,703 ft)

Population (2025)
  - Total: 2,265
- Time zone: UTC+1 (CET)
  - Summer (DST): UTC+2 (CEST)
- Postal code: 531 3
- Area code: +421 53
- Vehicle registration plate (until 2022): SN
- Website: www.spissketomasovce.sk

Spišské Tomášovce (Slovak pronunciation: [ˈspiʂskeː ˈtɔmaːʂɔwtse]; Hungarian: Szepestamásfalva) is a village and municipality in the Spišská Nová Ves District in the Košice Region of central-eastern Slovakia.

== History ==
In historical records the village was first mentioned in 1229.

== Geography ==
The municipality lies at an altitude of 519 metres (1,703 ft) and covers an area of 13.62 km^{2} (5.26 sq mi) (2025).

== Population ==
Population statistic (10 years)
Year	1995	2005	2015	2025
Count	1353	1608	1939	2265
Difference		+18.84%	+20.58%	+16.81%

Population statistic
Year	2024	2025
Count	2241	2265
Difference		+1.07%

It has a population of 2265 people (31 December 2025).

=== Ethnicity ===
Census 2021 (1+ %)
Ethnicity	Number	Fraction
Slovak	1814	85.97%
Romani	292	13.83%
Not found out	187	8.86%
Total	2110	

In year 2021 was 2110 people by ethnicity 1814 as Slovak, 292 as Romani, 187 as Not found out, 9 as Rusyn, 7 as Czech, 5 as Russian, 2 as Hungarian, 1 as Irish, 1 as Ukrainian, 1 as Italian, 1 as Canadian and 1 as Other.

Note on population: The difference values of population numbers in the table "Population statistic" and in the sections "Ethnicity" & "Religion" is caused by the use of various statistical methods.

=== Religion ===
Census 2021 (1+ %)
Religion	Number	Fraction
Roman Catholic Church	1525	72.27%
None	330	15.64%
Not found out	179	8.48%
Evangelical Church	22	1.04%
Total	2110	

In year 2021 was 2110 people by religion 1525 from Roman Catholic Church, 330 from None, 179 from Not found out, 22 from Evangelical Church, 18 from Greek Catholic Church, 10 from Eastern Orthodox Church, 6 from Christian Congregations in Slovakia, 4 from Islam, 4 from Other, 4 from Church of Jesus Christ of Latter-day Saints, 3 from Ad hoc movements, 2 from Calvinist Church, 2 from Other and not ascertained christian church and 1 from Jehovah's Witnesses.
