= Markušovce =

Markušovce Markušovce
- Municipality
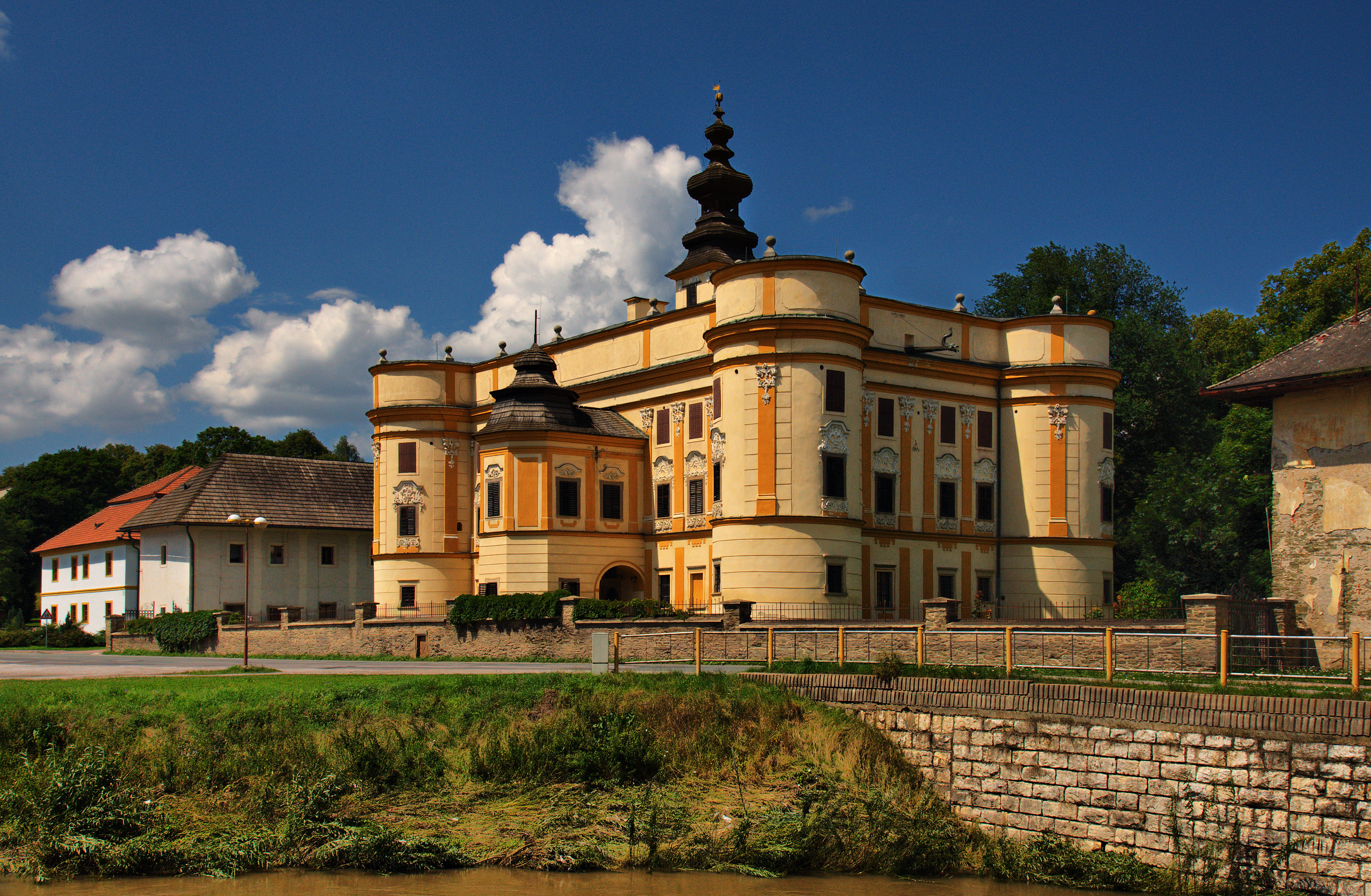
- The Markušovce Manor

- Flag

- Location of Markušovce in the Košice Region Location of Markušovce in Slovakia
- Coordinates: 48.92°N 20.63°E
- Country: Slovakia
- Region: Košice Region
- District: Spišská Nová Ves District
- First mentioned: 1289

Area
  - Total: 18.52 km^{2} (7.15 sq mi)
- Elevation: 425 m (1,394 ft)

Population (2025)
  - Total: 4,910
- Time zone: UTC+1 (CET)
  - Summer (DST): UTC+2 (CEST)
- Postal code: 532 1
- Area code: +421 53
- Vehicle registration plate (until 2022): SN
- Website: www.markusovce.sk

Markušovce (Slovak pronunciation: [ˈmarkuʂɔwtse]; Hungarian: Márkusfalva) is a village and municipality in the Spišská Nová Ves District in the Košice Region of central-eastern Slovakia.

== History ==
Markušovce was founded in the 12th century before the Tatar invasions of the region. The village was owned by the Máriássy family from the 13th century, and many members of the family are buried in the village's Church of St. Michael.

The castle of Markušovce Manor House dates from 1284. but was not used after a fire in 1773.

The Markušovce Manor was built in 1643 and is now a museum, together with the rococo belvedere or garden house 'Dardanely', dating from 1778, which stands in its grounds; this contains a collection of musical instruments and is frequently used for concerts.

== Geography ==
The municipality lies at an altitude of 425 metres (1,394 ft) and covers an area of 18.52 km^{2} (7.15 sq mi) (2025).

== Population ==
Population statistic (10 years)
Year	1995	2005	2015	2025
Count	2892	3563	4343	4910
Difference		+23.20%	+21.89%	+13.05%

Population statistic
Year	2024	2025
Count	4843	4910
Difference		+1.38%

It has a population of 4910 people (31 December 2025).

=== Ethnicity ===
Census 2021 (1+ %)
Ethnicity	Number	Fraction
Slovak	4168	90.13%
Romani	384	8.3%
Not found out	271	5.86%
Total	4624	

In year 2021 was 4624 people by ethnicity 4168 as Slovak, 384 as Romani, 271 as Not found out, 7 as Czech, 4 as Polish, 3 as Hungarian, 1 as Ukrainian, 1 as Rusyn, 1 as German, 1 as Moravian and 1 as Other.

Note on population: The difference values of population numbers in the table "Population statistic" and in the sections "Ethnicity" & "Religion" is caused by the use of various statistical methods.

A majority of the municipality's population consists of the local Roma community. In 2019, they constituted an estimated 65% of the local population.

=== Religion ===
Census 2021 (1+ %)
Religion	Number	Fraction
Roman Catholic Church	3751	81.12%
None	472	10.21%
Not found out	237	5.13%
Evangelical Church	51	1.1%
Total	4624	

In year 2021 was 4624 people by religion 3751 from Roman Catholic Church, 472 from None, 237 from Not found out, 51 from Evangelical Church, 45 from Greek Catholic Church, 15 from Jehovah's Witnesses, 15 from Christian Congregations in Slovakia, 10 from Calvinist Church, 5 from Ad hoc movements, 4 from Paganism and natural spirituality, 4 from Church of Jesus Christ of Latter-day Saints, 4 from Baptists Church, 3 from Old Catholic Church, 3 from Eastern Orthodox Church, 2 from Other and not ascertained christian church, 2 from United Methodist Church and 1 from Bahá'i Community.
