= Vítkovce =

Municipality of Slovakia

Vítkovce Vitfalva
- Municipality
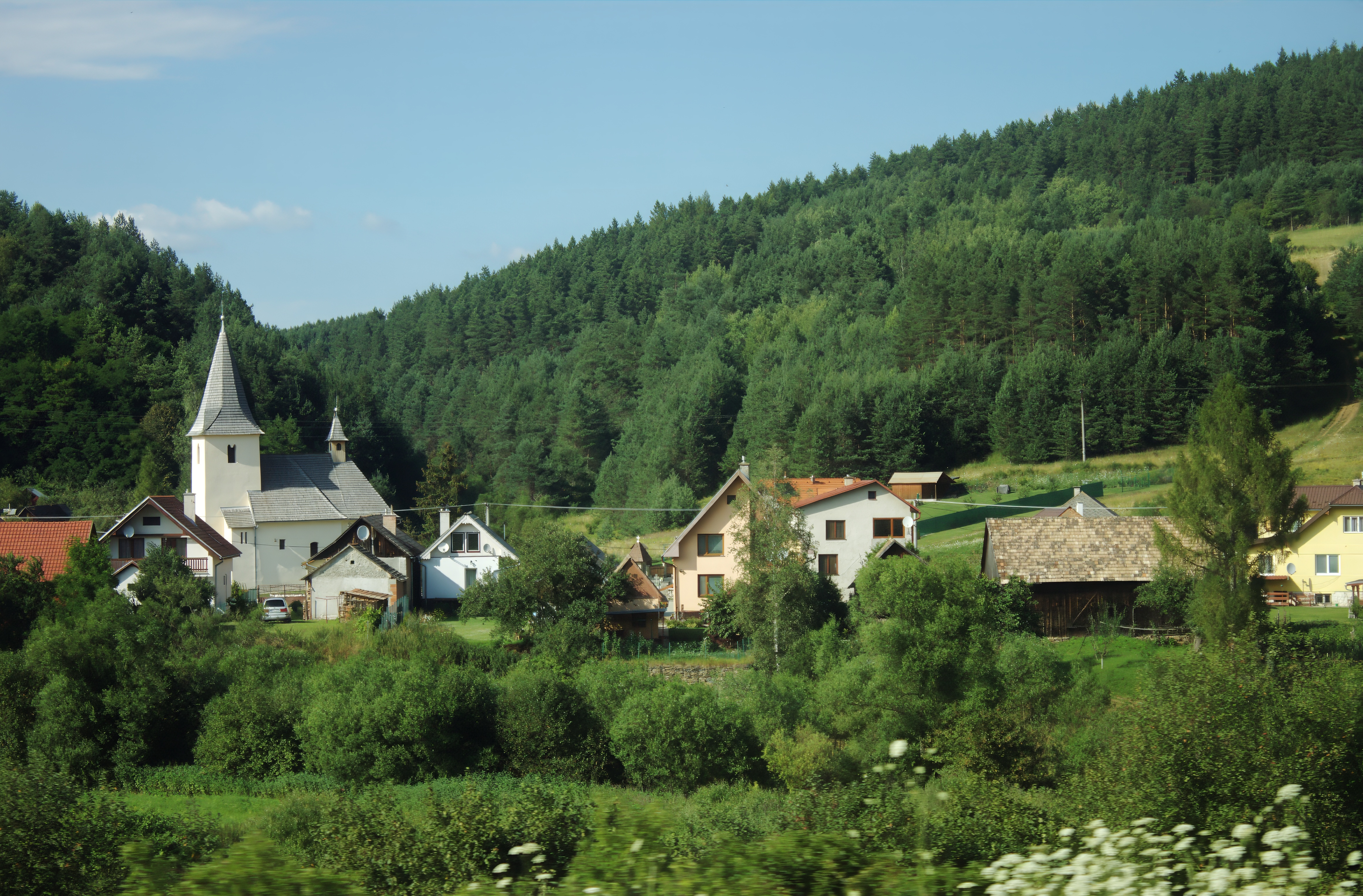

- Flag

- Location of Vítkovce in the Košice Region Location of Vítkovce in Slovakia
- Coordinates: 48.93°N 20.72°E
- Country: Slovakia
- Region: Košice Region
- District: Spišská Nová Ves District
- First mentioned: 1279

Area
  - Total: 5.19 km^{2} (2.00 sq mi)
- Elevation: 406 m (1,332 ft)

Population (2025)
  - Total: 673
- Time zone: UTC+1 (CET)
  - Summer (DST): UTC+2 (CEST)
- Postal code: 536 3
- Area code: +421 53
- Vehicle registration plate (until 2022): SN
- Website: www.obecvitkovce.sk

Vítkovce (Hungarian: Vitfalva) is a village and municipality in the Spišská Nová Ves District in the Košice Region of central-eastern Slovakia.

The village is located in the southern part of the Hornádska basin and in the northern part of the Galmus mountain range.

== History ==
In historical records the village was first mentioned in 1279.

== Geography ==
The municipality lies at an altitude of 406 metres (1,332 ft) and covers an area of 5.19 km^{2} (2.00 sq mi) (2025).

== Population ==
Population statistic (10 years)
Year	1995	2005	2015	2025
Count	426	510	606	673
Difference		+19.71%	+18.82%	+11.05%

Population statistic
Year	2024	2025
Count	671	673
Difference		+0.29%

It has a population of 673 people (31 December 2025).

=== Ethnicity ===
Census 2021 (1+ %)
Ethnicity	Number	Fraction
Slovak	586	92.42%
Romani	74	11.67%
Not found out	32	5.04%
Total	634	

In year 2021 was 634 people by ethnicity 586 as Slovak, 74 as Romani, 32 as Not found out, 4 as German, 1 as Czech, 1 as Rusyn and 1 as Other.

Note on population: The difference values of population numbers in the table "Population statistic" and in the sections "Ethnicity" & "Religion" is caused by the use of various statistical methods.

=== Religion ===
Census 2021 (1+ %)
Religion	Number	Fraction
Roman Catholic Church	514	81.07%
Church of the Brethren	45	7.1%
Not found out	32	5.05%
None	19	3%
United Methodist Church	8	1.26%
Christian Congregations in Slovakia	7	1.1%
Total	634	

In year 2021 was 634 people by religion 514 from Roman Catholic Church, 45 from Church of the Brethren, 32 from Not found out, 19 from None, 8 from United Methodist Church, 7 from Christian Congregations in Slovakia, 3 from Jehovah's Witnesses, 3 from Greek Catholic Church, 1 from Old Catholic Church, 1 from Evangelical Church and 1 from Czechoslovak Hussite Church.
