= Bystrany, Slovakia =

Bystrany
- Municipality
- Flag

- Location of Bystrany in the Košice Region Location of Bystrany in Slovakia
- Coordinates: 48.95°N 20.77°E
- Country: Slovakia
- Region: Košice Region
- District: Spišská Nová Ves District
- First mentioned: 1268

Area
  - Total: 7.81 km^{2} (3.02 sq mi)
- Elevation: 408 m (1,339 ft)

Population (2025)
  - Total: 4,122
- Time zone: UTC+1 (CET)
  - Summer (DST): UTC+2 (CEST)
- Postal code: 536 2
- Area code: +421 53
- Vehicle registration plate (until 2022): SN
- Website: www.obecbystrany.sk

Bystrany (Hungarian: Ágostháza) is a village and municipality in the Spišská Nová Ves District in the Košice Region of central-eastern Slovakia.

== History ==
In historical records the village was first mentioned in 1268.

== Population ==
Population statistic (10 years)
Year	1995	2005	2015	2025
Count	2204	2811	3390	4122
Difference		+27.54%	+20.59%	+21.59%

Population statistic
Year	2024	2025
Count	4052	4122
Difference		+1.72%

It has a population of 4122 people (31 December 2025).

=== Ethnicity ===
Census 2021 (1+ %)
Ethnicity	Number	Fraction
Slovak	3478	90.95%
Romani	3074	80.38%
Not found out	360	9.41%
Total	3824	

In year 2021 was 3824 people by ethnicity 3478 as Slovak, 3074 as Romani, 360 as Not found out, 2 as Czech, 2 as Austrian, 2 as Other, 1 as Rusyn, 1 as Hungarian and 1 as English.

Note on population: The difference values of population numbers in the table "Population statistic" and in the sections "Ethnicity" & "Religion" is caused by the use of various statistical methods.

=== Religion ===
Census 2021 (1+ %)
Religion	Number	Fraction
None	1487	38.89%
Roman Catholic Church	1218	31.85%
Not found out	698	18.25%
Evangelical Church	159	4.16%
Christian Congregations in Slovakia	142	3.71%
Apostolic Church	57	1.49%
Calvinist Church	49	1.28%
Total	3824	

In year 2021 was 3824 people by religion 1487 from None, 1218 from Roman Catholic Church, 698 from Not found out, 159 from Evangelical Church, 142 from Christian Congregations in Slovakia, 57 from Apostolic Church, 49 from Calvinist Church, 4 from Church of Jesus Christ of Latter-day Saints, 3 from Greek Catholic Church, 2 from Eastern Orthodox Church, 2 from Jehovah's Witnesses, 1 from Other and not ascertained christian church, 1 from United Methodist Church and 1 from Church of the Brethren.

The vast majority of the local population consists of the local Roma community. In 2019, they constituted an estimated 80% of the local population.

== Geography ==
The municipality lies at an altitude of 408 metres (1,339 ft) and covers an area of 7.81 km^{2} (3.02 sq mi) (2025).

== Genealogical resources ==
The records for genealogical research are available at the state archive "Statny Archiv in Levoca, Slovakia"

- Roman Catholic church records (births/marriages/deaths): 1779-1896 (parish A)

== See also ==
- List of municipalities and towns in Slovakia
