= Oľšavka, Spišská Nová Ves District =

Municipality in Slovakia

Oľšavka Kisolsva
- Municipality
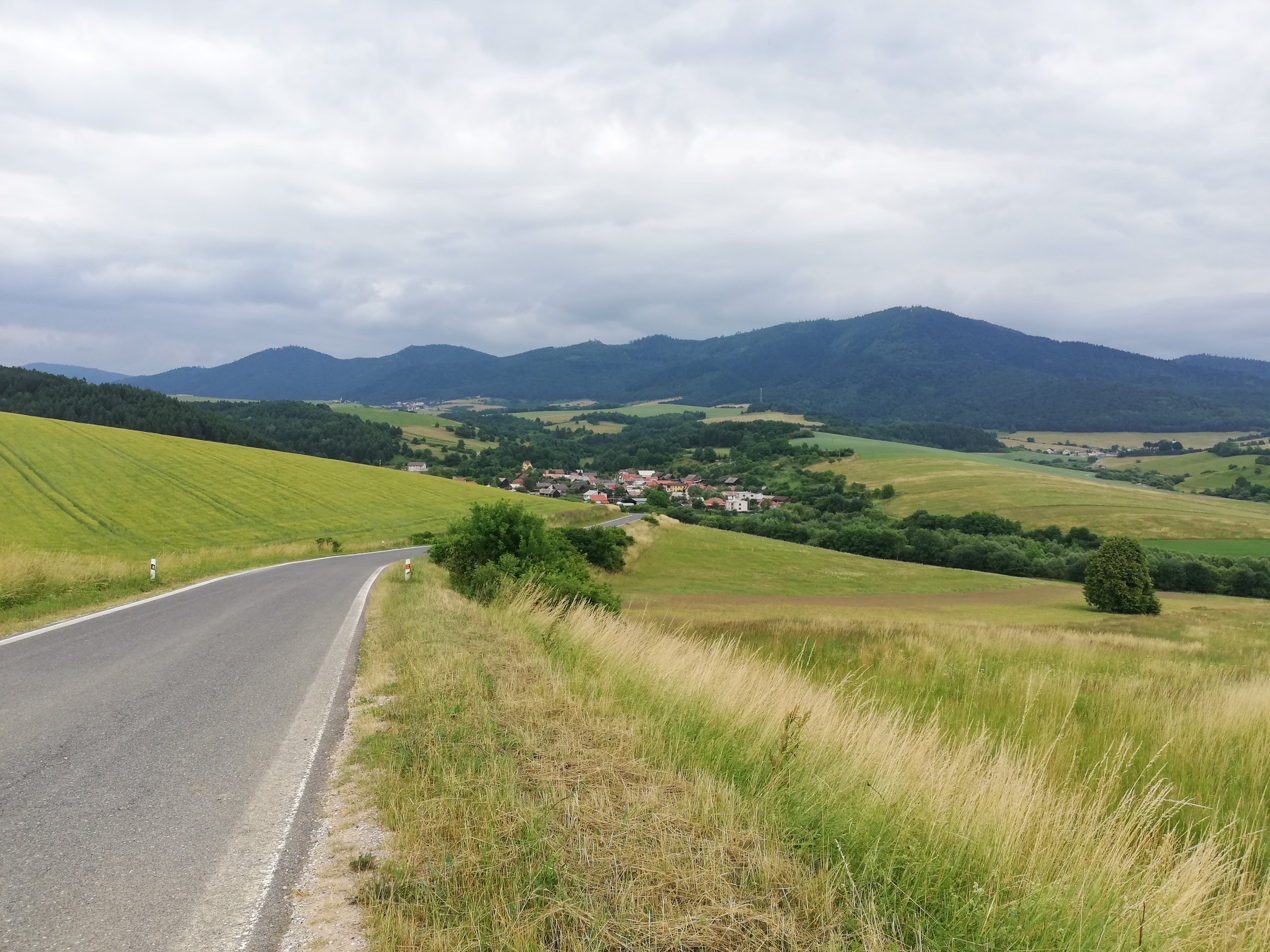

- Flag

- Location of Oľšavka in the Košice Region Location of Oľšavka in Slovakia
- Coordinates: 48.97°N 20.83°E
- Country: Slovakia
- Region: Košice Region
- District: Spišská Nová Ves District
- First mentioned: 1245

Area
  - Total: 3.01 km^{2} (1.16 sq mi)
- Elevation: 435 m (1,427 ft)

Population (2025)
  - Total: 184
- Time zone: UTC+1 (CET)
  - Summer (DST): UTC+2 (CEST)
- Postal code: 536 1
- Area code: +421 53
- Vehicle registration plate (until 2022): SN
- Website: olsavka.sk

Oľšavka (Hungarian: Kisolsva) is a village and municipality in the Spišská Nová Ves District in the Košice Region of central-eastern Slovakia.

== History ==
In historical records the village was first mentioned in 1245.

== Geography ==
The municipality lies at an altitude of 435 metres (1,427 ft) and covers an area of 3.01 km^{2} (1.16 sq mi) (2025).

== Population ==
Population statistic (10 years)
Year	1995	2005	2015	2025
Count	172	194	193	184
Difference		+12.79%	−0.51%	−4.66%

Population statistic
Year	2024	2025
Count	182	184
Difference		+1.09%

It has a population of 184 people (31 December 2025).

=== Ethnicity ===
Census 2021 (1+ %)
Ethnicity	Number	Fraction
Slovak	182	97.84%
Not found out	4	2.15%
Total	186	

In year 2021 was 186 people by ethnicity 182 as Slovak and 4 as Not found out.

Note on population: The difference values of population numbers in the table "Population statistic" and in the sections "Ethnicity" & "Religion" is caused by the use of various statistical methods.

=== Religion ===
Census 2021 (1+ %)
Religion	Number	Fraction
Roman Catholic Church	171	91.94%
None	10	5.38%
Not found out	4	2.15%
Total	186	

In year 2021 was 186 people by religion 171 from Roman Catholic Church, 10 from None, 4 from Not found out and 1 from Greek Catholic Church.
