= Poráč =

Poráč Vereshegy
- Municipality
- Flag

- Location of Poráč in the Košice Region Location of Poráč in Slovakia
- Coordinates: 48.88°N 20.73°E
- Country: Slovakia
- Region: Košice Region
- District: Spišská Nová Ves District
- First mentioned: 1358

Area
  - Total: 18.81 km^{2} (7.26 sq mi)
- Elevation: 771 m (2,530 ft)

Population (2025)
  - Total: 1,007
- Time zone: UTC+1 (CET)
  - Summer (DST): UTC+2 (CEST)
- Postal code: 532 3
- Area code: +421 53
- Vehicle registration plate (until 2022): SN
- Website: www.porac.sk

Poráč (Hungarian: Vereshegy) is a village and municipality in the Spišská Nová Ves District in the Košice Region of central-eastern Slovakia. The population was 1,036 in the 2001 census.

== History ==
In historical records the village was first mentioned in 1358. Until 1918 under Hungarian rule, the village was called Poráčs.

== Geography ==
The municipality lies at an altitude of 771 metres (2,530 ft) and covers an area of 18.81 km^{2} (7.26 sq mi) (2025).

== Population ==
Population statistic (10 years)
Year	1995	2005	2015	2025
Count	977	1029	983	1007
Difference		+5.32%	−4.47%	+2.44%

Population statistic
Year	2024	2025
Count	1011	1007
Difference		−0.39%

It has a population of 1007 people (31 December 2025).

=== Ethnicity ===
Census 2021 (1+ %)
Ethnicity	Number	Fraction
Slovak	882	87.67%
Rusyn	283	28.13%
Romani	255	25.34%
Not found out	75	7.45%
Total	1006	

In year 2021 was 1006 people by ethnicity 882 as Slovak, 283 as Rusyn, 255 as Romani, 75 as Not found out, 9 as Ukrainian, 1 as Czech and 1 as Russian.

Note on population: The difference values of population numbers in the table "Population statistic" and in the sections "Ethnicity" & "Religion" is caused by the use of various statistical methods.

=== Religion ===
Census 2021 (1+ %)
Religion	Number	Fraction
Greek Catholic Church	561	55.77%
None	158	15.71%
Roman Catholic Church	103	10.24%
Evangelical Church	79	7.85%
Not found out	42	4.17%
Christian Congregations in Slovakia	38	3.78%
Jehovah's Witnesses	11	1.09%
Total	1006	

In year 2021 was 1006 people by religion 561 from Greek Catholic Church, 158 from None, 103 from Roman Catholic Church, 79 from Evangelical Church, 42 from Not found out, 38 from Christian Congregations in Slovakia, 11 from Jehovah's Witnesses, 8 from Eastern Orthodox Church, 3 from Ad hoc movements, 2 from Paganism and natural spirituality and 1 from Other.
