= Hnilec (village) =

Hnilec Nyilas
- Municipality
- Flag Coat of arms

- Location of Hnilec (village) in the Košice Region Location of Hnilec (village) in Slovakia
- Coordinates: 48.83°N 20.50°E
- Country: Slovakia
- Region: Košice Region
- District: Spišská Nová Ves District
- First mentioned: 1290

Area
  - Total: 27.05 km^{2} (10.44 sq mi)
- Elevation: 651 m (2,136 ft)

Population (2025)
  - Total: 404
- Time zone: UTC+1 (CET)
  - Summer (DST): UTC+2 (CEST)
- Postal code: 537 5
- Area code: +421 53
- Vehicle registration plate (until 2022): SN
- Website: www.hnilec.eu

Hnilec (Hungarian: Nyilas) is a village and municipality in the Spišská Nová Ves District in the Košice Region of central-eastern Slovakia.

== History ==
In historical records the village was first mentioned in 1290.

== Geography ==
The municipality lies at an altitude of 651 metres (2,136 ft) and covers an area of 27.05 km^{2} (10.44 sq mi) (2025).

== Population ==
Population statistic (10 years)
Year	1995	2005	2015	2025
Count	550	498	434	404
Difference		−9.45%	−12.85%	−6.91%

Population statistic
Year	2024	2025
Count	411	404
Difference		−1.70%

It has a population of 404 people (31 December 2025).

=== Ethnicity ===
Census 2021 (1+ %)
Ethnicity	Number	Fraction
Slovak	390	94.2%
Not found out	18	4.34%
Romani	8	1.93%
Total	414	

In year 2021 was 414 people by ethnicity 390 as Slovak, 18 as Not found out, 8 as Romani, 3 as Rusyn, 2 as Irish and 1 as Czech.

Note on population: The difference values of population numbers in the table "Population statistic" and in the sections "Ethnicity" & "Religion" is caused by the use of various statistical methods.

=== Religion ===
Census 2021 (1+ %)
Religion	Number	Fraction
Roman Catholic Church	331	79.95%
None	41	9.9%
Not found out	19	4.59%
Greek Catholic Church	7	1.69%
Christian Congregations in Slovakia	6	1.45%
Total	414	

In year 2021 was 414 people by religion 331 from Roman Catholic Church, 41 from None, 19 from Not found out, 7 from Greek Catholic Church, 6 from Christian Congregations in Slovakia, 3 from Eastern Orthodox Church, 2 from Jehovah's Witnesses, 2 from Other, 1 from Hinduism, 1 from Evangelical Church and 1 from Ad hoc movements.

== Genealogical resources ==
The records for genealogical research are available at the state archive "Statny Archiv in Levoca, Slovakia"

- Roman Catholic church records (births/marriages/deaths): 1765-1912 (parish A)
- Lutheran church records (births/marriages/deaths): 1783-1896 (parish B)

== See also ==
- List of municipalities and towns in Slovakia
