= Teplička, Spišská Nová Ves District =

Teplička
- Municipality
- Flag

- Location of Teplička in the Košice Region Location of Teplička in Slovakia
- Coordinates: 48.92°N 20.60°E
- Country: Slovakia
- Region: Košice Region
- District: Spišská Nová Ves District
- First mentioned: 1328

Area
  - Total: 7.73 km^{2} (2.98 sq mi)
- Elevation: 540 m (1,770 ft)

Population (2025)
  - Total: 1,123
- Time zone: UTC+1 (CET)
  - Summer (DST): UTC+2 (CEST)
- Postal code: 520 1
- Area code: +421 53
- Vehicle registration plate (until 2022): SN
- Website: www.teplicka.sk

Teplička (Hungarian: Hernádtapolca) is a village and municipality in the Spišská Nová Ves District in the Košice Region of central-eastern Slovakia.

== History ==
In historical records the village was first mentioned in 1328.

== Geography ==
The municipality lies at an altitude of 540 metres (1,770 ft) and covers an area of 7.73 km^{2} (2.98 sq mi) (2025).

== Population ==
Population statistic (10 years)
Year	1995	2005	2015	2025
Count	1057	1111	1144	1123
Difference		+5.10%	+2.97%	−1.83%

Population statistic
Year	2024	2025
Count	1123	1123
Difference		+0%

It has a population of 1123 people (31 December 2025).

=== Ethnicity ===
Census 2021 (1+ %)
Ethnicity	Number	Fraction
Slovak	1052	90.92%
Not found out	93	8.03%
Total	1157	

In year 2021 was 1157 people by ethnicity 1052 as Slovak, 93 as Not found out, 9 as Romani, 8 as Rusyn, 2 as Russian, 1 as Czech, 1 as Serbian, 1 as Hungarian and 1 as Other.

Note on population: The difference values of population numbers in the table "Population statistic" and in the sections "Ethnicity" & "Religion" is caused by the use of various statistical methods.

=== Religion ===
Census 2021 (1+ %)
Religion	Number	Fraction
Roman Catholic Church	909	78.57%
None	123	10.63%
Not found out	89	7.69%
Greek Catholic Church	17	1.47%
Total	1157	

In year 2021 was 1157 people by religion 909 from Roman Catholic Church, 123 from None, 89 from Not found out, 17 from Greek Catholic Church, 7 from Evangelical Church, 5 from Eastern Orthodox Church, 4 from Jehovah's Witnesses, 1 from Other, 1 from Buddhism and 1 from Ad hoc movements.
