= Abrahámovce =

Abrahámovce may refer to several places in Slovakia:

- Abrahámovce, Bardejov
- Abrahámovce, Kežmarok
