= Jezersko =

Jezersko may refer to:

- Municipality of Jezersko in northern Slovenia
- Seeberg Saddle (Jezerski vrh), a mountain pass connecting Austria and Slovenia
- Jezersko, Kežmarok District, the village and municipality in northern Slovakia
