= Spišské =

Spišské may refer to:

- Spišské Bystré, large village and municipality in Poprad District in the Prešov Region of northern Slovakia
- Spišské Hanušovce, village and municipality in Kežmarok District in the Prešov Region of north Slovakia
- Spišské Podhradie, town in Spiš in the Prešov Region of Slovakia
- Spišské Tomášovce, village and municipality in the Spišská Nová Ves District in the Košice Region of central-eastern Slovakia
- Spišské Vlachy, town in eastern Slovakia
