= Holumnica =

- Municipality
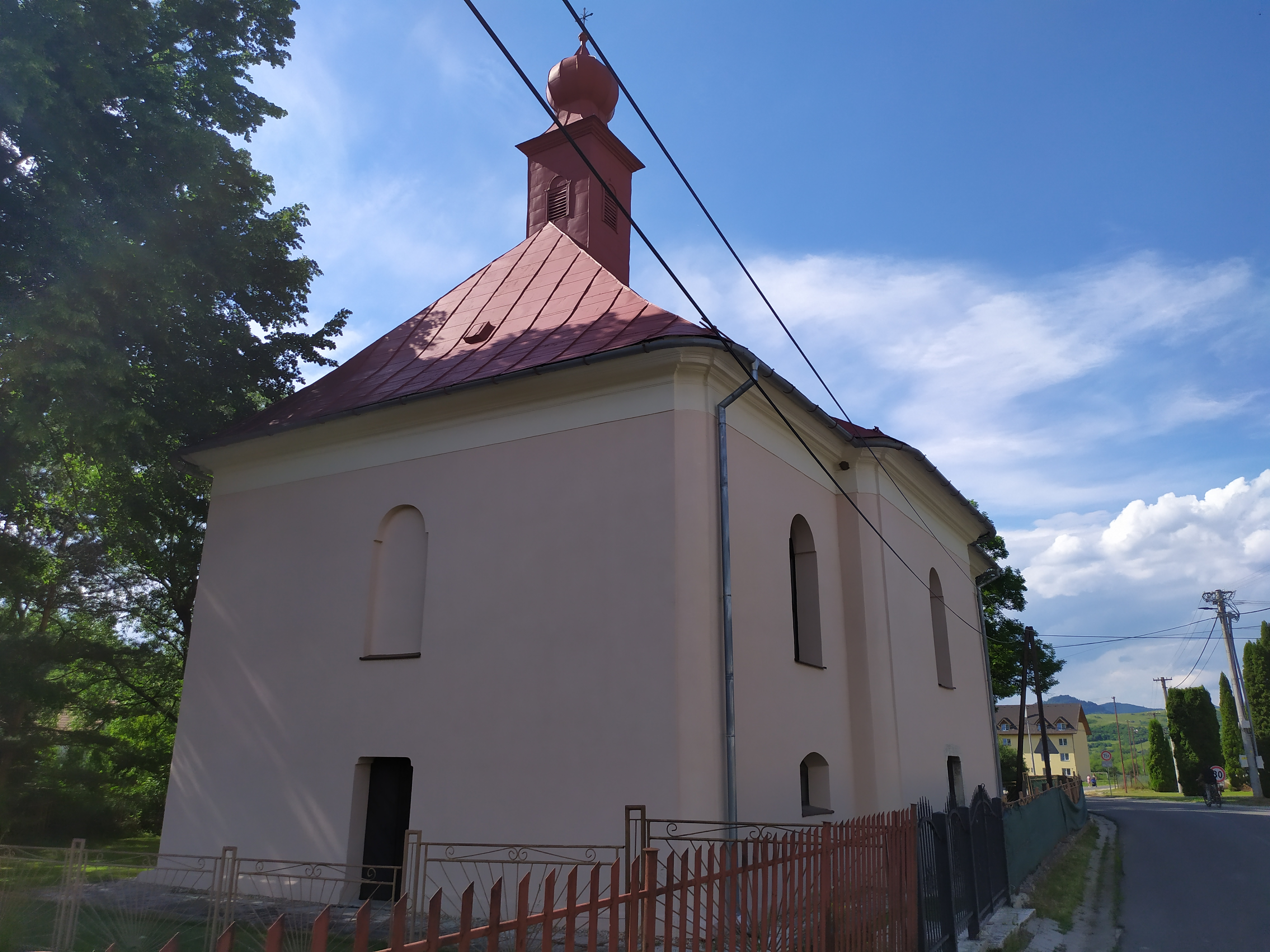

- Flag

- Location of Holumnica in the Prešov Region Location of Holumnica in Slovakia
- Coordinates: 49.23°N 20.36°E
- Country: Slovakia
- Region: Prešov Region
- District: Kežmarok District
- First mentioned: 1293

Area
  - Total: 8.94 km^{2} (3.45 sq mi)
- Elevation: 594 m (1,949 ft)

Population (2025)
  - Total: 934
- Time zone: UTC+1 (CET)
  - Summer (DST): UTC+2 (CEST)
- Postal code: 599 4
- Area code: +421 52
- Vehicle registration plate (until 2022): KK
- Website: obecholumnica.sk

Holumnica (German: Hollomnitz, Hungarian: Hollólomnic, Rusyn: Голумнїца) is a village and municipality in Kežmarok District in the Prešov Region of north Slovakia.

== History ==
In historical records the village was first mentioned in 1293.

In 1910 the village had 535 mainly German inhabitants of Lutheran confession. It was part of the German language island of the Oberzips. Before the establishment of independent Czechoslovakia in 1918, Holumnica was part of Szepes County within the Kingdom of Hungary. From 1939 to 1945, it was part of the Slovak Republic. On 26 January 1945, the Red Army dislodged the Wehrmacht from Holumnica and it was once again part of Czechoslovakia. After the end of World War II the German population was expelled according to the Beneš decrees.

== Geography ==
The municipality lies at an altitude of 594 metres (1,949 ft) and covers an area of 8.94 km^{2} (3.45 sq mi) (2025).

== Population ==
Population statistic (10 years)
Year	1995	2005	2015	2025
Count	737	819	875	934
Difference		+11.12%	+6.83%	+6.74%

Population statistic
Year	2024	2025
Count	930	934
Difference		+0.43%

It has a population of 934 people (31 December 2025).

=== Ethnicity ===
Census 2021 (1+ %)
Ethnicity	Number	Fraction
Slovak	875	94.59%
Romani	150	16.21%
Not found out	19	2.05%
Total	925	

In year 2021 was 925 people by ethnicity 875 as Slovak, 150 as Romani, 19 as Not found out, 6 as Czech, 5 as German, 3 as Rusyn, 3 as Hungarian, 2 as Ukrainian and 1 as Bulgarian.

Note on population: The difference values of population numbers in the table "Population statistic" and in the sections "Ethnicity" & "Religion" is caused by the use of various statistical methods.

=== Religion ===
Census 2021 (1+ %)
Religion	Number	Fraction
Roman Catholic Church	787	85.08%
Evangelical Church	55	5.95%
None	42	4.54%
Seventh-day Adventist Church	13	1.41%
Not found out	12	1.3%
Total	925	

In year 2021 was 925 people by religion 787 from Roman Catholic Church, 55 from Evangelical Church, 42 from None, 13 from Seventh-day Adventist Church, 12 from Not found out, 9 from Greek Catholic Church, 3 from Eastern Orthodox Church, 3 from Ad hoc movements and 1 from Other and not ascertained christian church.

== Economy and infrastructure ==
In Holumnica is elementary school, kindergarten, public library, football pitch, post, medical service, foodstuff store and cable TV network. Cultural sightseeings are remnants of the castle, manor house, classical evangelical and gothic Roman Catholic churches.

== See also ==
- List of municipalities and towns in Slovakia

== Genealogical resources ==
The records for genealogical research are available at the state archive "Statny Archiv in Levoca, Slovakia"

- Roman Catholic church records (births/marriages/deaths): 1768-1896 (parish A)
- Greek Catholic church records (births/marriages/deaths): 1877-1925 (parish B)
- Lutheran church records (births/marriages/deaths): 1785-1906 (parish A)
