= Stráne pod Tatrami =

- Municipality
- Flag

- Location of Stráne pod Tatrami in the Prešov Region Location of Stráne pod Tatrami in Slovakia
- Coordinates: 49.16°N 20.37°E
- Country: Slovakia
- Region: Prešov Region
- District: Kežmarok District
- First mentioned: 1438

Area
  - Total: 4.21 km^{2} (1.63 sq mi)
- Elevation: 693 m (2,274 ft)

Population (2025)
  - Total: 2,580
- Time zone: UTC+1 (CET)
  - Summer (DST): UTC+2 (CEST)
- Postal code: 597 6
- Area code: +421 52
- Vehicle registration plate (until 2022): KK
- Website: www.stranepodtatrami.sk

Stráne pod Tatrami (until 1948 Folvarky German: Forberg, Hungarian: Tátraalja, Rusyn: Странє под Татрамі) is a village and municipality in Kežmarok District in the Prešov Region of north Slovakia.

== History ==
In historical records the village was first mentioned in 1438. It belonged to a German language island. Before the establishment of independent Czechoslovakia in 1918, Stráne pod Tatrami was part of Szepes County within the Kingdom of Hungary. From 1939 to 1945, it was part of the Slovak Republic. On 27 January 1945, the Red Army dislodged the Wehrmacht from Stráne pod Tatrami in the course of the Western Carpathian offensive and it was once again part of Czechoslovakia. The German population was expelled in 1945.

== Geography ==
The municipality lies at an altitude of 693 metres (2,274 ft) and covers an area of 4.21 km^{2} (1.63 sq mi) (2025).

== Population ==
Population statistic (10 years)
Year	1995	2005	2015	2025
Count	930	1333	2385	2580
Difference		+43.33%	+78.91%	+8.17%

Population statistic
Year	2024	2025
Count	2528	2580
Difference		+2.05%

It has a population of 2580 people (31 December 2025).

=== Ethnicity ===
Census 2021 (1+ %)
Ethnicity	Number	Fraction
Slovak	2190	95.67%
Romani	150	6.55%
Not found out	25	1.09%
Total	2289	

In year 2021 was 2289 people by ethnicity 2190 as Slovak, 150 as Romani, 25 as Not found out, 7 as German, 2 as Czech, 2 as Rusyn and 2 as Polish.

Note on population: The difference values of population numbers in the table "Population statistic" and in the sections "Ethnicity" & "Religion" is caused by the use of various statistical methods.

The vast majority of the municipality's population consists of the local Roma community. In 2019, they constituted an estimated 95% of the local population.

=== Religion ===
Census 2021 (1+ %)
Religion	Number	Fraction
Roman Catholic Church	1938	84.67%
None	177	7.73%
Christian Congregations in Slovakia	100	4.37%
Seventh-day Adventist Church	26	1.14%
Total	2289	

In year 2021 was 2289 people by religion 1938 from Roman Catholic Church, 177 from None, 100 from Christian Congregations in Slovakia, 26 from Seventh-day Adventist Church, 18 from Not found out, 17 from Evangelical Church, 6 from Greek Catholic Church, 3 from Eastern Orthodox Church, 2 from Calvinist Church, 1 from Old Catholic Church and 1 from Buddhism.
