= Kežmarok District =

Coordinates: 49°8′14″N 20°25′46″E

- District
- Country: Slovakia
- Region (kraj): Prešov Region
- Seat: Kežmarok

Area
  - Total: 629.82 km^{2} (243.17 sq mi)

Population (2025)
  - Total: 76,376
- Time zone: UTC+1 (CET)
  - Summer (DST): UTC+2 (CEST)
- Telephone prefix: 052
- Vehicle registration plate (until 2022): KK
- Municipalities: 41

Kežmarok District (Slovak: okres Kežmarok) is a district in the Prešov Region of eastern Slovakia. Its seat, cultural and economic center is Kežmarok, the traditional center of the historic Spiš region. The Kežmarok district was established in 1923 and exists in its present borders from 1996. Currently it consists of 42 municipalities, from which 3 have a town status. Main economic branches are industry and tourism. In the Kežmarok district Slovakia's top tourist attractions are located such as Pieniny National Park with easy access to the High Tatra Mountains. The district lies mainly on a foothills of High Tatras.

Kežmarok district borders Stará Ľubovňa District, Levoča District, Poprad District, Sabinov District and Poland.

== Population ==
Population statistic (10 years)
Year	1995	2005	2015	2025
Count	59,727	65,689	73,110	76,376
Difference		+9.98%	+11.29%	+4.46%

Population statistic
Year	2024	2025
Count	75,862	76,376
Difference		+0.67%

It has a population of 76,376 people (31 December 2025).

Historical population
Year	Pop.	±%
1970	47,983	—
1980	52,402	+9.2%
1991	56,203	+7.3%
2001	63,231	+12.5%
2011	70,487	+11.5%
2021	73,685	+4.5%
Source: Statistical Office of the Slovak Republic

=== Ethnicity ===
Census 2021 (1+ %)
Ethnicity	Number	Fraction
Slovak	65,857	77.73%
Romani	12,520	14.77%
Not found out	4668	5.5%
Total	84,720	

In year 2021 was 84,720 people by ethnicity 65,857 as Slovak, 12,520 as Romani, 4668 as Not found out, 450 as Rusyn, 331 as Czech, 222 as Polish, 164 as Other, 152 as German, 79 as Ukrainian, 78 as Hungarian, 67 as Russian, 20 as Vietnamese, 18 as Chinese, 18 as Italian, 12 as English, 11 as Moravian, 10 as Canadian, 8 as Austrian, 7 as Jewish, 6 as Romanian, 6 as Croatian, 4 as Irish, 4 as Turkish, 2 as Serbian, 2 as French, 2 as Bulgarian, 1 as Iranian and 1 as Albanian.

Note on population: The difference values of population numbers in the table "Population statistic" and in the sections "Ethnicity" & "Religion" is caused by the use of various statistical methods.

=== Religion ===
Census 2021 (1+ %)
Religion	Number	Fraction
Roman Catholic Church	58,224	79.02%
None	6827	9.27%
Not found out	3042	4.13%
Greek Catholic Church	1950	2.65%
Evangelical Church	1741	2.36%
Total	73,685	

In year 2021 was 73,685 people by religion 58,224 from Roman Catholic Church, 6827 from None, 3042 from Not found out, 1950 from Greek Catholic Church, 1741 from Evangelical Church, 513 from Christian Congregations in Slovakia, 249 from Eastern Orthodox Church, 239 from Jehovah's Witnesses, 231 from Seventh-day Adventist Church, 195 from Other and not ascertained christian church, 134 from Ad hoc movements, 73 from Other, 67 from Calvinist Church, 49 from Buddhism, 37 from Apostolic Church, 35 from Paganism and natural spirituality, 22 from Baptists Church, 21 from United Methodist Church, 9 from Islam, 7 from Old Catholic Church, 6 from Jewish community, 5 from Hinduism, 4 from Church of the Brethren, 2 from Church of Jesus Christ of Latter-day Saints, 2 from Bahá'i Community and 1 from Czechoslovak Hussite Church.

== Municipalities ==
Municipality	Area [km^{2}]	Population
Abrahámovce	6.65	262
Bušovce	9.03	296
Červený Kláštor	3.01	219
Havka	6.01	41
Holumnica	8.94	934
Hradisko	2.63	102
Huncovce	13.26	3,251
Ihľany	9.58	1,589
Jezersko	7.78	75
Jurské	3.83	1,545
Kežmarok	24.83	14,984
Krížová Ves	11.92	2,468
Lechnica	12.52	269
Lendak	19.65	5,689
Ľubica	26.42	4,517
Majere	1.35	138
Malá Franková	10.80	193
Malý Slavkov	4.98	1,311
Matiašovce	17.50	866
Mlynčeky	7.67	733
Osturňa	41.24	274
Podhorany	11.02	3,095
Rakúsy	6.34	3,601
Reľov	14.99	332
Slovenská Ves	22.44	1,859
Spišská Belá	33.93	6,648
Spišská Stará Ves	17.56	2,131
Spišské Hanušovce	14.29	769
Stará Lesná	9.48	992
Stráne pod Tatrami	4.21	2,580
Toporec	28.12	2,069
Tvarožná	9.27	835
Veľká Franková	10.63	327
Veľká Lomnica	19.11	5,612
Vlková	11.81	1,005
Vlkovce	3.83	494
Vojňany	5.79	331
Vrbov	19.30	1,524
Výborná	10.54	1,469
Zálesie	4.78	84
Žakovce	16.03	863

Population and area values are current for year 2025.

=== Dissolved ===
- Javorina

== Local Enterprises ==
- Isometall, s.r.o. - metal (steel, iron, etc.) manufacture - (http://www.isometall.sk)
