= Vlková =

- Municipality
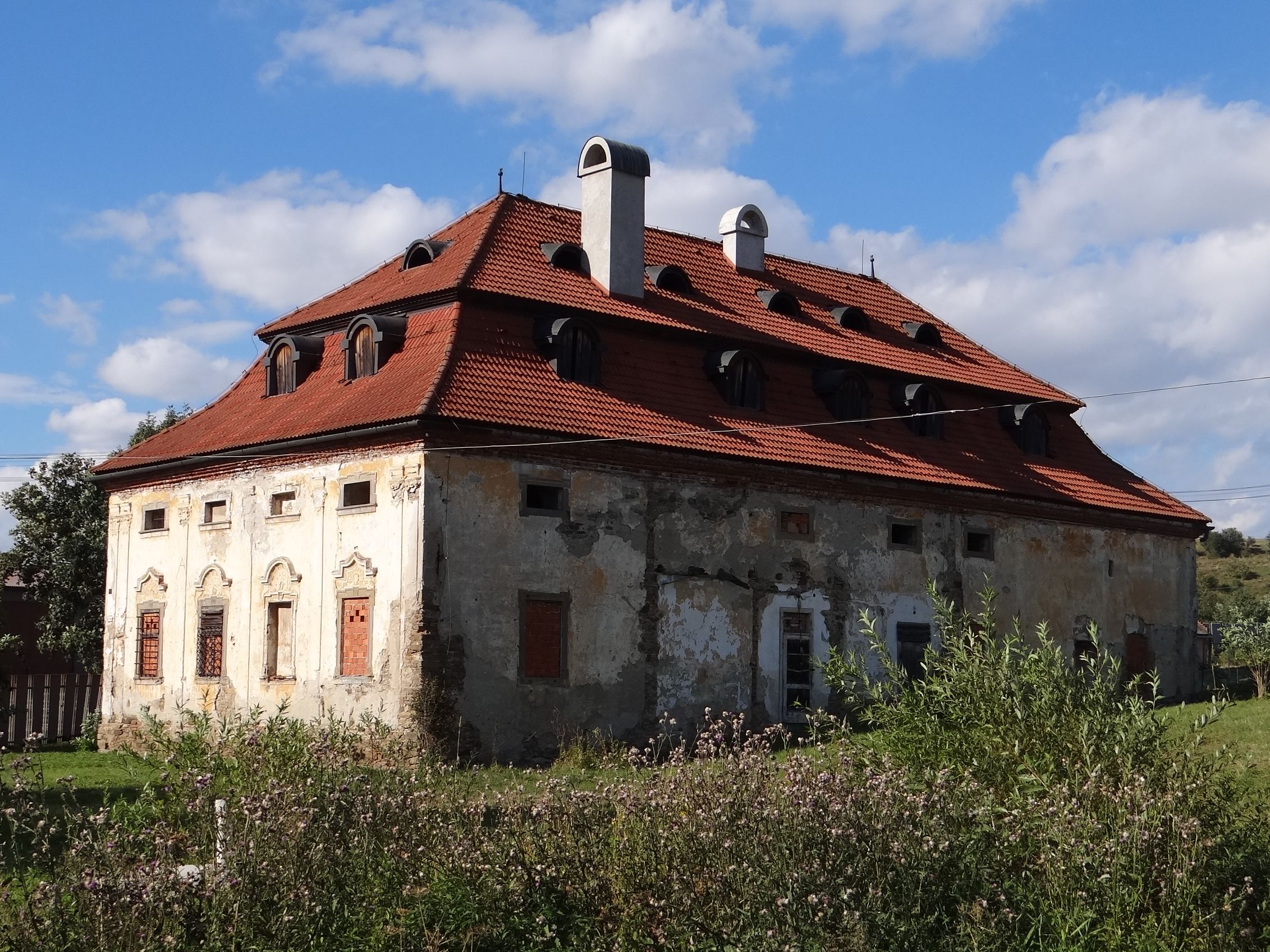
- Late Baroque chateau in the village

- Flag

- Location of Vlková in Slovakia. Vlková (Prešov Region)
- Coordinates: 49°05′N 20°26′E
- Country: Slovakia
- Region: Prešov Region
- District: Kežmarok District

Government
  - Mayor: Peter Bendík (SNS, Smer-SD, Hlas)

Area
  - Total: 11.81 km^{2} (4.56 sq mi)
- Elevation: 670 m (2,200 ft)

Population (2025)
  - Total: 1,005
- Time zone: UTC+1 (CET)
  - Summer (DST): UTC+2 (CEST)
- Postal code: 059 72
- Area code: +421-52
- Website: www.vlkova.sk

Vlková (Hungarian: Farkasfalva, German: Farksdorf) is a village and municipality in Kežmarok District in the Prešov Region of north Slovakia.

== History ==
In historical records the village was first mentioned in 1278.

== Geography ==
The municipality lies at an altitude of 670 metres (2,200 ft) and covers an area of 11.81 km^{2} (4.56 sq mi) (2025).

== Population ==
Population statistic (10 years)
Year	1995	2005	2015	2025
Count	613	655	733	1005
Difference		+6.85%	+11.90%	+37.10%

Population statistic
Year	2024	2025
Count	976	1005
Difference		+2.97%

It has a population of 1005 people (31 December 2025).

=== Ethnicity ===
Census 2021 (1+ %)
Ethnicity	Number	Fraction
Slovak	842	98.47%
Not found out	13	1.52%
Total	855	

In year 2021 was 855 people by ethnicity 842 as Slovak, 13 as Not found out, 8 as Rusyn, 4 as Czech, 3 as Polish, 1 as Ukrainian and 1 as Albanian.

Note on population: The difference values of population numbers in the table "Population statistic" and in the sections "Ethnicity" & "Religion" is caused by the use of various statistical methods.

=== Religion ===
Census 2021 (1+ %)
Religion	Number	Fraction
Roman Catholic Church	763	89.24%
None	49	5.73%
Greek Catholic Church	22	2.57%
Not found out	9	1.05%
Total	855	

In year 2021 was 855 people by religion 763 from Roman Catholic Church, 49 from None, 22 from Greek Catholic Church, 9 from Not found out, 4 from Evangelical Church, 2 from Christian Congregations in Slovakia, 2 from Buddhism, 1 from Eastern Orthodox Church, 1 from Islam, 1 from Other and 1 from Ad hoc movements.
