= Toporec =

- Municipality
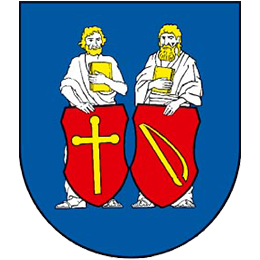
- Flag Coat of arms

- Location of Toporec in the Prešov Region Location of Toporec in Slovakia
- Coordinates: 49.27°N 20.50°E
- Country: Slovakia
- Region: Prešov Region
- District: Kežmarok District
- First mentioned: 1277

Area
  - Total: 28.12 km^{2} (10.86 sq mi)
- Elevation: 603 m (1,978 ft)

Population (2025)
  - Total: 2,069
- Time zone: UTC+1 (CET)
  - Summer (DST): UTC+2 (CEST)
- Postal code: 599 4
- Area code: +421 52
- Vehicle registration plate (until 2022): KK
- Website: www.toporec.sk

Toporec (Hungarian: Toporc, German: Topporz, Rusyn: Топорец) is a village and municipality in Kežmarok District in the Prešov Region of north Slovakia.

== History ==
In historical records the village was first mentioned in 1277. Between 1000 and 1918, it was a part of the Kingdom of Hungary. In 1918 it became part of Czechoslovakia. The 1773 and 1796 censuses recorded a Slovak majority.

In 1818 Artúr Görgei was born in Toporec.

In 1910 the village had 818 mainly German inhabitants of Lutheran confession. It was part of the German language island of the Oberzips. Before the establishment of independent Czechoslovakia in 1918, Toporec was part of Szepes County within the Kingdom of Hungary. From 1939 to 1945, it was part of the Slovak Republic. On 26 January 1945, the Red Army dislodged the Wehrmacht from Toporec and it was once again part of Czechoslovakia. After the end of World War II the German population was expelled according to the Beneš decrees.

== Population ==
Population statistic (10 years)
Year	1995	2005	2015	2025
Count	1555	1713	1897	2069
Difference		+10.16%	+10.74%	+9.06%

Population statistic
Year	2024	2025
Count	2055	2069
Difference		+0.68%

It has a population of 2069 people (31 December 2025).

=== Ethnicity ===
Census 2021 (1+ %)
Ethnicity	Number	Fraction
Slovak	1868	93.96%
Romani	902	45.37%
Not found out	130	6.53%
Total	1988	

In year 2021 was 1988 people by ethnicity 1868 as Slovak, 902 as Romani, 130 as Not found out, 5 as Czech, 5 as Polish, 4 as Other, 1 as Rusyn, 1 as Romanian and 1 as German.

Note on population: The difference values of population numbers in the table "Population statistic" and in the sections "Ethnicity" & "Religion" is caused by the use of various statistical methods.

=== Religion ===
Census 2021 (1+ %)
Religion	Number	Fraction
Roman Catholic Church	1838	92.45%
None	84	4.23%
Not found out	38	1.91%
Total	1988	

In year 2021 was 1988 people by religion 1838 from Roman Catholic Church, 84 from None, 38 from Not found out, 10 from Greek Catholic Church, 4 from Christian Congregations in Slovakia, 3 from Evangelical Church, 2 from Jehovah's Witnesses, 2 from Other, 2 from Ad hoc movements, 1 from Calvinist Church, 1 from Eastern Orthodox Church, 1 from Other and not ascertained christian church, 1 from Seventh-day Adventist Church and 1 from Apostolic Church.

The majority of the municipality's population consists of the members of the local Roma community. In 2019, they constituted an estimated 70% of the population.

== Geography ==
The municipality lies at an altitude of 603 metres (1,978 ft) and covers an area of 28.12 km^{2} (10.86 sq mi) (2025).
