= Mlynčeky =

- Municipality
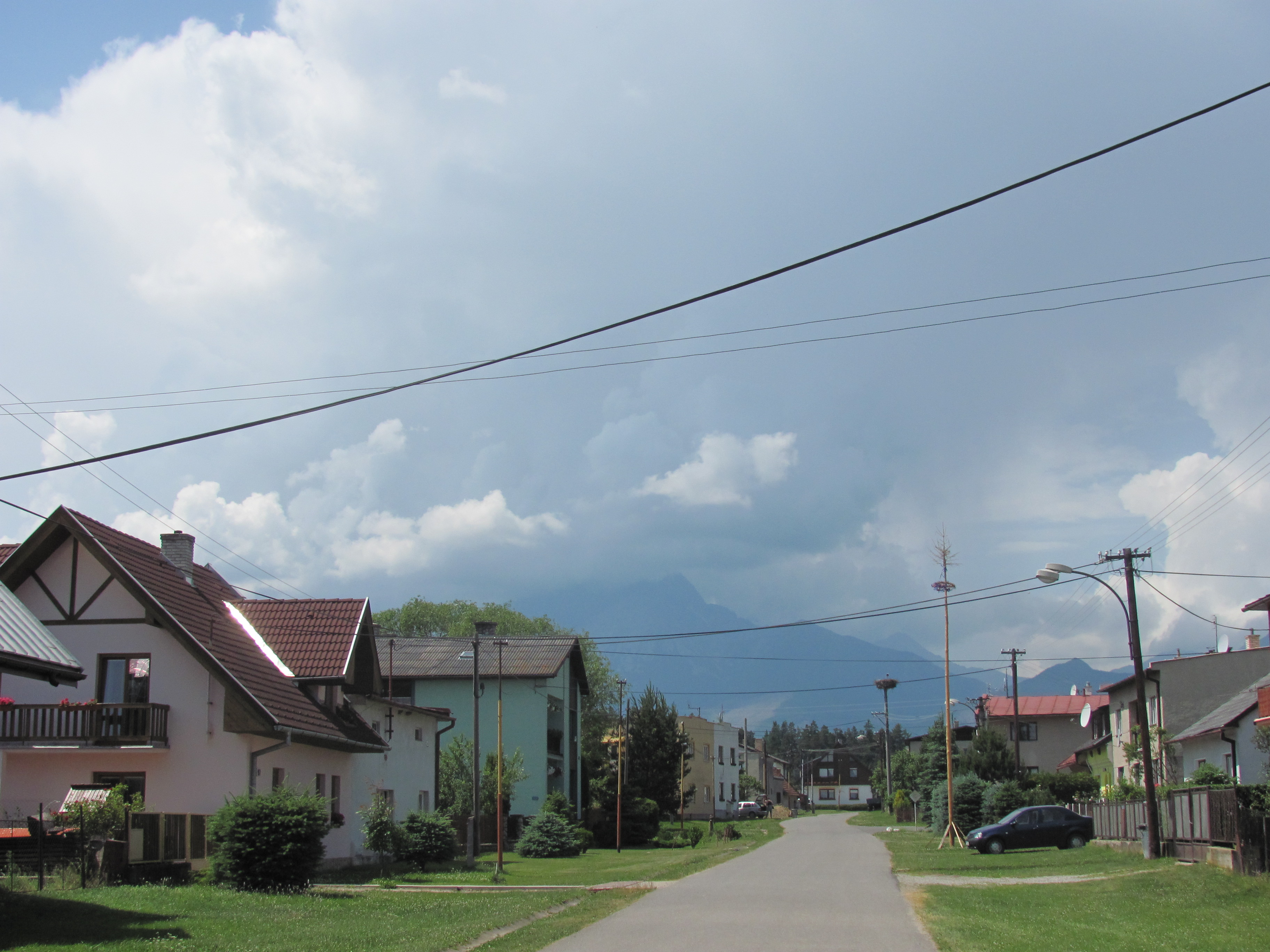

- Flag

- Location of Mlynčeky in the Prešov Region Location of Mlynčeky in Slovakia
- Coordinates: 49.17°N 20.39°E
- Country: Slovakia
- Region: Prešov Region
- District: Kežmarok District
- First mentioned: 1896

Government
  - Mayor: Milena Svocáková

Area
  - Total: 7.67 km^{2} (2.96 sq mi)
- Elevation: 687 m (2,254 ft)

Population (2025)
  - Total: 733
- Time zone: UTC+1 (CET)
  - Summer (DST): UTC+2 (CEST)
- Postal code: 597 6
- Area code: +421 52
- Vehicle registration plate (until 2022): KK
- Website: www.mlynceky.sk

Mlynčeky (Hungarian: Tátraháza, German: Mühlerchen, Rusyn: Млінчекі) is a village and municipality in Kežmarok District in the Prešov Region of north Slovakia.

== Geography ==
The municipality lies at an altitude of 687 metres (2,254 ft) and covers an area of 7.67 km^{2} (2.96 sq mi) (2025).

== History ==
The village itself was established in 1956. At the end of 18th century was just one watermill located at the place of present village. Afterwards a pub had been constructed. Then the Mlynčeky became a settlement and in 1956 it obtained village status. Before the establishment of independent Czechoslovakia in 1918, the settlement of Mlynčeky was part of Szepes County within the Kingdom of Hungary. From 1939 to 1945, it was part of the Slovak Republic. On 27 January 1945, the Red Army dislodged the Wehrmacht from Mlynčeky in the course of the Western Carpathian offensive and it was once again part of Czechoslovakia.

== Population ==
Population statistic (10 years)
Year	1995	2005	2015	2025
Count	548	616	663	733
Difference		+12.40%	+7.62%	+10.55%

Population statistic
Year	2024	2025
Count	710	733
Difference		+3.23%

It has a population of 733 people (31 December 2025).

=== Ethnicity ===
Census 2021 (1+ %)
Ethnicity	Number	Fraction
Slovak	651	95.87%
Not found out	27	3.97%
Total	679	

In year 2021 was 679 people by ethnicity 651 as Slovak, 27 as Not found out, 5 as Other, 3 as Czech, 2 as Italian, 1 as Jewish, 1 as Serbian, 1 as Rusyn, 1 as Polish and 1 as Hungarian.

Note on population: The difference values of population numbers in the table "Population statistic" and in the sections "Ethnicity" & "Religion" is caused by the use of various statistical methods.

=== Religion ===
Census 2021 (1+ %)
Religion	Number	Fraction
Roman Catholic Church	560	82.47%
None	47	6.92%
Not found out	23	3.39%
Evangelical Church	17	2.5%
Seventh-day Adventist Church	10	1.47%
Greek Catholic Church	9	1.33%
Total	679	

In year 2021 was 679 people by religion 560 from Roman Catholic Church, 47 from None, 23 from Not found out, 17 from Evangelical Church, 10 from Seventh-day Adventist Church, 9 from Greek Catholic Church, 5 from United Methodist Church, 2 from Eastern Orthodox Church, 2 from Christian Congregations in Slovakia, 2 from Other, 1 from Buddhism and 1 from Ad hoc movements.
