= Malý Slavkov =

- Municipality
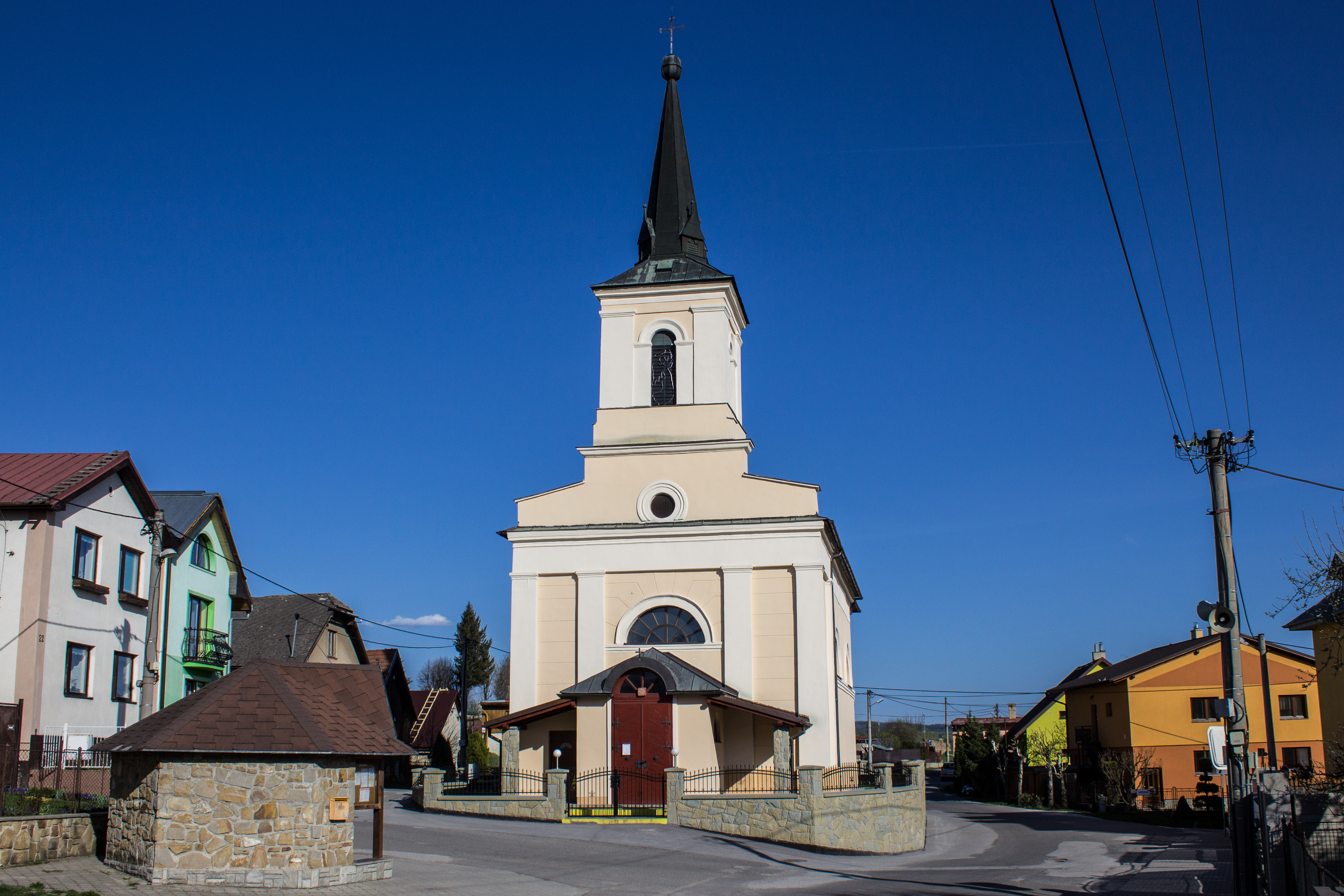

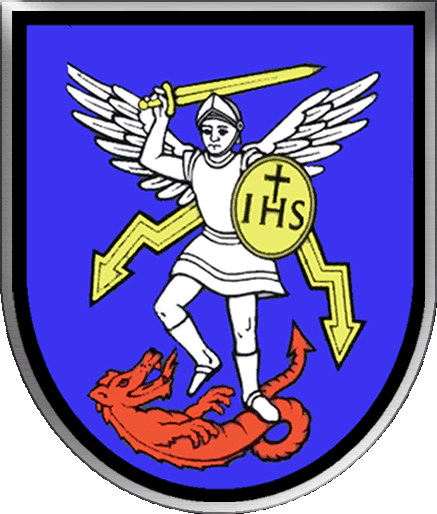
- Flag Coat of arms

- Location of Malý Slavkov in the Prešov Region Location of Malý Slavkov in Slovakia
- Coordinates: 49.14°N 20.39°E
- Country: Slovakia
- Region: Prešov Region
- District: Kežmarok District
- First mentioned: 1867

Area
  - Total: 4.98 km^{2} (1.92 sq mi)
- Elevation: 652 m (2,139 ft)

Population (2025)
  - Total: 1,311
- Time zone: UTC+1 (CET)
  - Summer (DST): UTC+2 (CEST)
- Postal code: 600 1
- Area code: +421 52
- Vehicle registration plate (until 2022): KK
- Website: malyslavkov.sk

Malý Slavkov (Hungarian: Kisszalók, German: Kleinschlagendorf, Rusyn: Малі Славков) is a village and municipality in Kežmarok District in the Prešov Region of north Slovakia.

== History ==
First written record is dated from 1251. Before the establishment of independent Czechoslovakia in 1918, Malý Slavkov was part of Szepes County within the Kingdom of Hungary. From 1939 to 1945, it was part of the Slovak Republic. On 27 January 1945, the Red Army dislodged the Wehrmacht from Malý Slavkov in the course of the Western Carpathian offensive and it was once again part of Czechoslovakia.

== Geography ==
The municipality lies at an altitude of 652 metres (2,139 ft) and covers an area of 4.98 km^{2} (1.92 sq mi) (2025).

== Population ==
Population statistic (10 years)
Year	1995	2005	2015	2025
Count	712	868	997	1311
Difference		+21.91%	+14.86%	+31.49%

Population statistic
Year	2024	2025
Count	1269	1311
Difference		+3.30%

It has a population of 1311 people (31 December 2025).

=== Ethnicity ===
Census 2021 (1+ %)
Ethnicity	Number	Fraction
Slovak	1032	91.65%
Romani	111	9.85%
Not found out	32	2.84%
Total	1126	

In year 2021 was 1126 people by ethnicity 1032 as Slovak, 111 as Romani, 32 as Not found out, 6 as Russian, 5 as Rusyn, 3 as Czech, 3 as Other, 2 as Ukrainian, 1 as Polish and 1 as German.

Note on population: The difference values of population numbers in the table "Population statistic" and in the sections "Ethnicity" & "Religion" is caused by the use of various statistical methods.

=== Religion ===
Census 2021 (1+ %)
Religion	Number	Fraction
Roman Catholic Church	974	86.5%
None	76	6.75%
Not found out	31	2.75%
Christian Congregations in Slovakia	13	1.15%
Evangelical Church	12	1.07%
Total	1126	

In year 2021 was 1126 people by religion 974 from Roman Catholic Church, 76 from None, 31 from Not found out, 13 from Christian Congregations in Slovakia, 12 from Evangelical Church, 6 from Greek Catholic Church, 5 from Other and not ascertained christian church, 4 from Eastern Orthodox Church, 3 from Other, 1 from United Methodist Church and 1 from Ad hoc movements.
