= Vojňany =

- Municipality
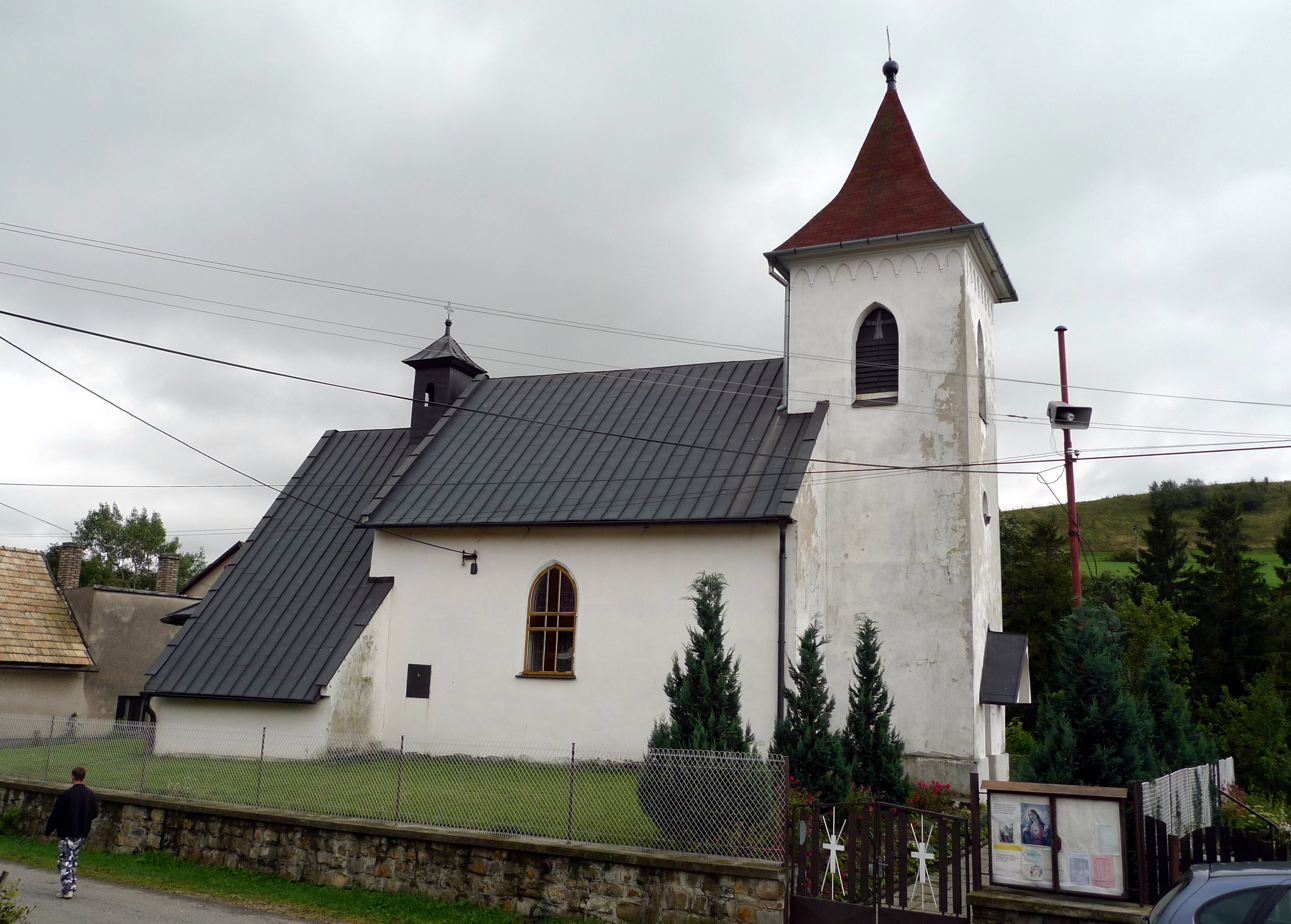
- Vojnany ulice.JPG

- Flag

- Location of Vojňany in the Prešov Region Location of Vojňany in Slovakia
- Coordinates: 49.25°N 20.44°E
- Country: Slovakia
- Region: Prešov Region
- District: Kežmarok District
- First mentioned: 1235

Area
  - Total: 5.79 km^{2} (2.24 sq mi)
- Elevation: 666 m (2,185 ft)

Population (2025)
  - Total: 331
- Time zone: UTC+1 (CET)
  - Summer (DST): UTC+2 (CEST)
- Postal code: 590 2
- Area code: +421 52
- Vehicle registration plate (until 2022): KK
- Website: www.vojnany.sk

Vojňany (Hungarian: Krig, German: Kreig, Rusyn: Войняні) is a village and municipality in the Kežmarok District, Prešov Region of north Slovakia.

== History ==
In historical records the village was first mentioned in 1235. Before the establishment of independent Czechoslovakia in 1918, Vojňany was part of Szepes County within the Kingdom of Hungary. From 1939 to 1945, it was part of the Slovak Republic. On 27 January 1945, the Red Army dislodged the Wehrmacht from Vojňany in the course of the Western Carpathian offensive and it was once again part of Czechoslovakia.

== Geography ==
The municipality lies at an altitude of 666 metres (2,185 ft) and covers an area of 5.79 km^{2} (2.24 sq mi) (2025).

== Population ==
Population statistic (10 years)
Year	1995	2005	2015	2025
Count	231	270	302	331
Difference		+16.88%	+11.85%	+9.60%

Population statistic
Year	2024	2025
Count	318	331
Difference		+4.08%

It has a population of 331 people (31 December 2025).

=== Ethnicity ===
Census 2021 (1+ %)
Ethnicity	Number	Fraction
Slovak	303	98.69%
Not found out	5	1.62%
Total	307	

In year 2021 was 307 people by ethnicity 303 as Slovak, 5 as Not found out and 1 as Czech.

Note on population: The difference values of population numbers in the table "Population statistic" and in the sections "Ethnicity" & "Religion" is caused by the use of various statistical methods.

=== Religion ===
Census 2021 (1+ %)
Religion	Number	Fraction
Roman Catholic Church	191	62.21%
Evangelical Church	79	25.73%
Seventh-day Adventist Church	21	6.84%
None	6	1.95%
Not found out	4	1.3%
Total	307	

In year 2021 was 307 people by religion 191 from Roman Catholic Church, 79 from Evangelical Church, 21 from Seventh-day Adventist Church, 6 from None, 4 from Not found out, 2 from Other and not ascertained christian church, 2 from Greek Catholic Church, 1 from Eastern Orthodox Church and 1 from Baptists Church.
