= Havka =

- Municipality
- Flag

- Location of Havka in the Prešov Region Location of Havka in Slovakia
- Coordinates: 49.34°N 20.41°E
- Country: Slovakia
- Region: Prešov Region
- District: Kežmarok District
- First mentioned: 1337

Area
  - Total: 6.01 km^{2} (2.32 sq mi)
- Elevation: 627 m (2,057 ft)

Population (2025)
  - Total: 41
- Time zone: UTC+1 (CET)
  - Summer (DST): UTC+2 (CEST)
- Postal code: 610 1
- Area code: +421 52
- Vehicle registration plate (until 2022): KK

Havka (Hungarian: Hóka, German: Haffke, Rusyn: Гавка) is a village and municipality in Kežmarok District in the Prešov Region of northern Slovakia.

== History ==
In historical records the village was first mentioned in 1337. The village's history is tied in with that of the nearby Červený Kláštor Carthusian Monastery. More recently, in the nineteenth century, a number of ethnic Germans settled here. Before the establishment of independent Czechoslovakia in 1918, Havka was part of Szepes County within the Kingdom of Hungary. From 1939 to 1945, it was part of the Slovak Republic. On 27 January 1945, the Red Army dislodged the Wehrmacht from Havka in the course of the Western Carpathian offensive and it was once again part of Czechoslovakia.

== Geography ==
The municipality lies at an altitude of 627 metres (2,057 ft) and covers an area of 6.01 km^{2} (2.32 sq mi) (2025).

== See also ==
- List of municipalities and towns in Slovakia

== Population ==
Population statistic (10 years)
Year	1995	2005	2015	2025
Count	54	39	47	41
Difference		−27.77%	+20.51%	−12.76%

Population statistic
Year	2024	2025
Count	39	41
Difference		+5.12%

It has a population of 41 people (31 December 2025).

=== Ethnicity ===
Census 2021 (1+ %)
Ethnicity	Number	Fraction
Slovak	43	95.55%
Not found out	3	6.66%
Total	45	

In year 2021 was 45 people by ethnicity 43 as Slovak and 3 as Not found out.

Note on population: The difference values of population numbers in the table "Population statistic" and in the sections "Ethnicity" & "Religion" is caused by the use of various statistical methods.

=== Religion ===
Census 2021 (1+ %)
Religion	Number	Fraction
Roman Catholic Church	41	91.11%
Not found out	2	4.44%
Greek Catholic Church	1	2.22%
None	1	2.22%
Total	45	

In year 2021 was 45 people by religion 41 from Roman Catholic Church, 2 from Not found out, 1 from Greek Catholic Church and 1 from None.

== Genealogical resources ==
The records for genealogical research are available at the state archive "Statny Archiv in Levoca, Slovakia"

- Roman Catholic church records (births/marriages/deaths): 1766-1898 (parish B)
