= Jurské =

- Municipality
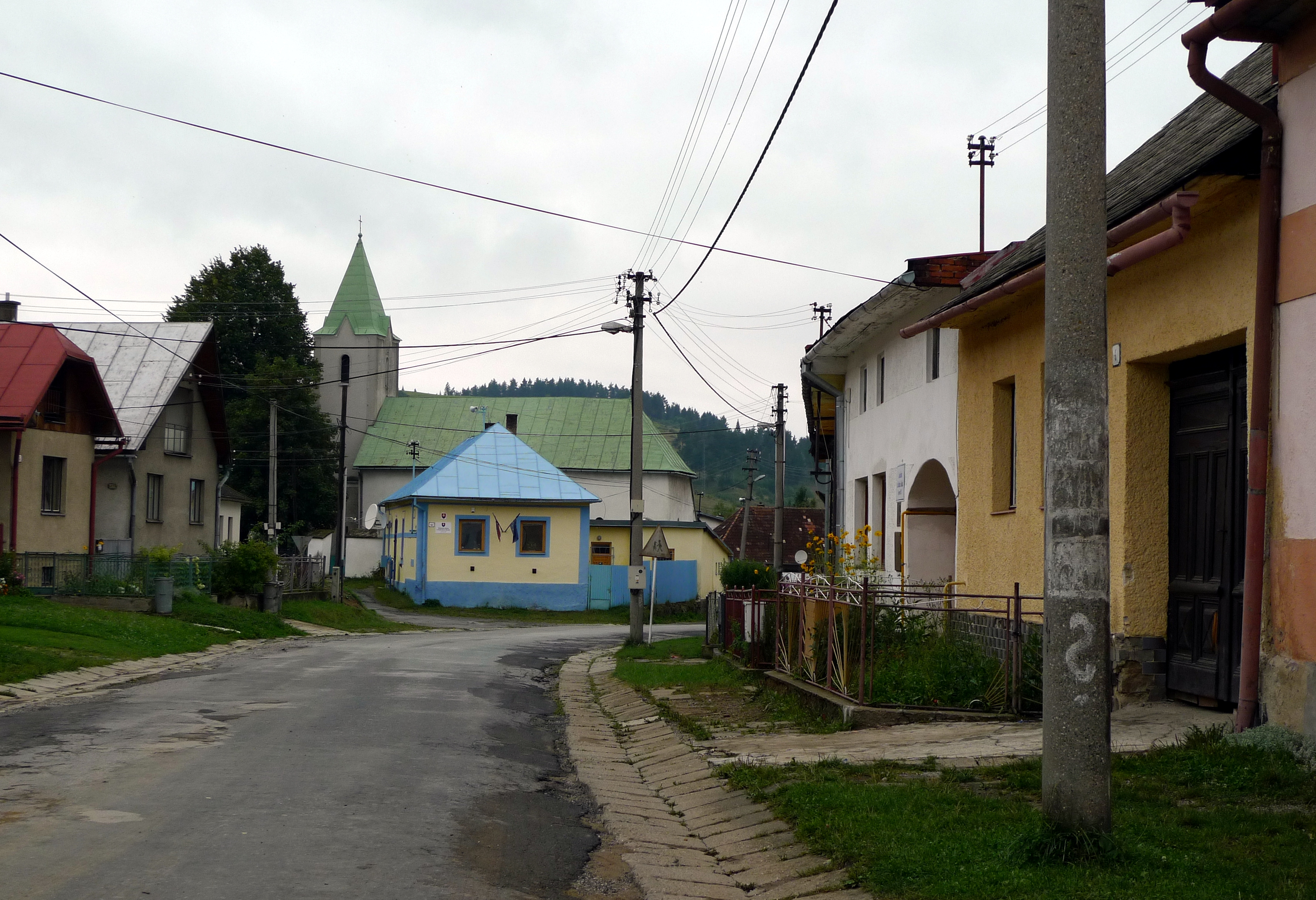

- Flag

- Location of Jurské in the Prešov Region Location of Jurské in Slovakia
- Coordinates: 49.20°N 20.36°E
- Country: Slovakia
- Region: Prešov Region
- District: Kežmarok District
- First mentioned: 1294

Area
  - Total: 3.83 km^{2} (1.48 sq mi)
- Elevation: 640 m (2,100 ft)

Population (2025)
  - Total: 1,545
- Time zone: UTC+1 (CET)
  - Summer (DST): UTC+2 (CEST)
- Postal code: 599 4
- Area code: +421 52
- Vehicle registration plate (until 2022): KK
- Website: www.obecjurske.sk

Jurské (Hungarian: Szepesszentgyörgy, German: Sankt Georgen, Rusyn: Юрске) is a village and municipality in Kežmarok District in the Prešov Region of north Slovakia.

== History ==
In historical records the village was first mentioned in 1294. Before the establishment of independent Czechoslovakia in 1918, Jurské was part of Szepes County within the Kingdom of Hungary. From 1939 to 1945, it was part of the Slovak Republic. On 26 January 1945, the Red Army dislodged the Wehrmacht from Jurské in the course of the Western Carpathian offensive and it was once again part of Czechoslovakia.

== Geography ==
The municipality lies at an altitude of 640 metres (2,100 ft) and covers an area of 3.83 km^{2} (1.48 sq mi) (2025).

== Population ==
Population statistic (10 years)
Year	1995	2005	2015	2025
Count	623	844	1160	1545
Difference		+35.47%	+37.44%	+33.18%

Population statistic
Year	2024	2025
Count	1504	1545
Difference		+2.72%

It has a population of 1545 people (31 December 2025).

=== Ethnicity ===
Census 2021 (1+ %)
Ethnicity	Number	Fraction
Slovak	1242	90.52%
Romani	146	10.64%
Not found out	54	3.93%
Total	1372	

In year 2021 was 1372 people by ethnicity 1242 as Slovak, 146 as Romani, 54 as Not found out, 1 as Czech and 1 as Hungarian.

Note on population: The difference values of population numbers in the table "Population statistic" and in the sections "Ethnicity" & "Religion" is caused by the use of various statistical methods.

=== Religion ===
Census 2021 (1+ %)
Religion	Number	Fraction
Roman Catholic Church	1196	87.17%
None	110	8.02%
Not found out	41	2.99%
Total	1372	

In year 2021 was 1372 people by religion 1196 from Roman Catholic Church, 110 from None, 41 from Not found out, 13 from Greek Catholic Church, 8 from Evangelical Church, 2 from Eastern Orthodox Church and 2 from Christian Congregations in Slovakia.

According to 2021 census, Jurské has a total population of 1372. The vast majority of this population consists of the local Roma community. In 2019, they constituted an estimated 98% of the local population.

In the village is kindergarten. elementary school, football pitch and a foodstuff store. Cultural sightseeings are baroque Roman Catholic and classical evangelical churches.

== See also ==
- List of municipalities and towns in Slovakia

== Genealogical resources ==
The records for genealogical research are available at the state archive "Statny Archiv in Levoca, Slovakia"

- Roman Catholic church records (births/marriages/deaths): 1768-1896 (parish B)
- Greek Catholic church records (births/marriages/deaths): 1822-1925 (parish B)
- Lutheran church records (births/marriages/deaths): 1785-1906 (parish B)
