= Ihľany =

- Municipality
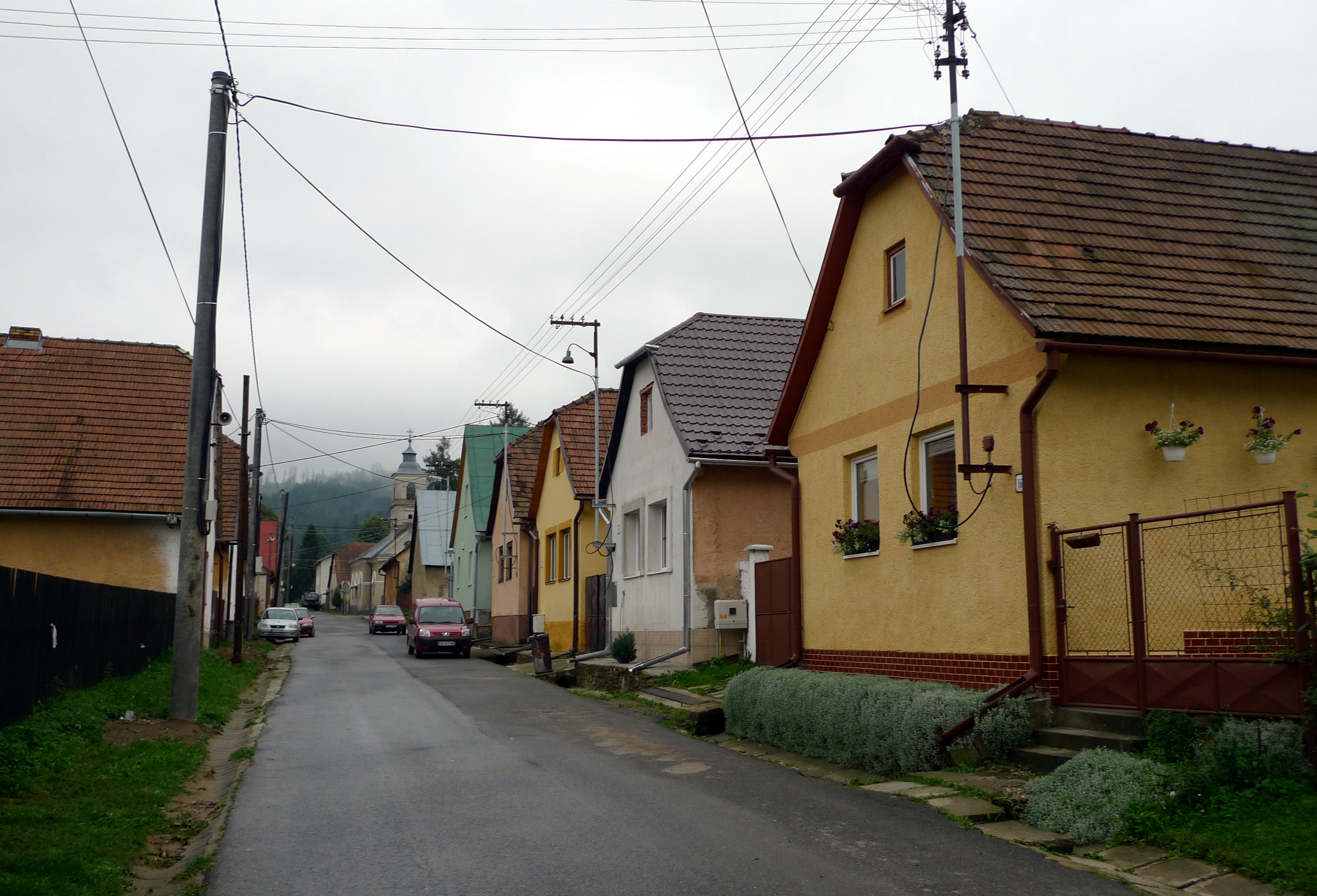

- Flag

- Location of Ihľany in the Prešov Region Location of Ihľany in Slovakia
- Coordinates: 49.18°N 20.54°E
- Country: Slovakia
- Region: Prešov Region
- District: Kežmarok District
- First mentioned: 1307

Area
  - Total: 9.58 km^{2} (3.70 sq mi)
- Elevation: 684 m (2,244 ft)

Population (2025)
  - Total: 1,589
- Time zone: UTC+1 (CET)
  - Summer (DST): UTC+2 (CEST)
- Postal code: 599 4
- Area code: +421 52
- Vehicle registration plate (until 2022): KK
- Website: www.ihlany.sk

Ihľany (Rusyn: Ігляны, Goral: Majōrki, Hungarian: Majorka, German: Maierhofen) is a village and municipality in Kežmarok District in the Prešov Region of north Slovakia.

== History ==
In historical records the village was first mentioned in 1307. Before the establishment of independent Czechoslovakia in 1918, Ihľany was part of Szepes County within the Kingdom of Hungary. From 1939 to 1945, it was part of the Slovak Republic. On 26 January 1945, the Red Army dislodged the Wehrmacht from Ihľany and it was once again part of Czechoslovakia.

== Geography ==
The municipality lies at an altitude of 684 metres (2,244 ft) and covers an area of 9.58 km^{2} (3.70 sq mi) (2025).

== See also ==
- List of municipalities and towns in Slovakia

== Population ==
Population statistic (10 years)
Year	1995	2005	2015	2025
Count	1163	1346	1506	1589
Difference		+15.73%	+11.88%	+5.51%

Population statistic
Year	2024	2025
Count	1563	1589
Difference		+1.66%

It has a population of 1589 people (31 December 2025).

=== Ethnicity ===
Census 2021 (1+ %)
Ethnicity	Number	Fraction
Slovak	1432	91.56%
Romani	466	29.79%
Rusyn	75	4.79%
Not found out	53	3.38%
Total	1564	

In year 2021 was 1564 people by ethnicity 1432 as Slovak, 466 as Romani, 75 as Rusyn, 53 as Not found out, 7 as Czech, 3 as Ukrainian, 1 as Romanian, 1 as Polish and 1 as Hungarian.

Note on population: The difference values of population numbers in the table "Population statistic" and in the sections "Ethnicity" & "Religion" is caused by the use of various statistical methods.

The vast majority of the municipality's population consists of the local Roma community. In 2019, they constituted an estimated 75% of the local population.

=== Religion ===
Census 2021 (1+ %)
Religion	Number	Fraction
Roman Catholic Church	1228	78.52%
Greek Catholic Church	178	11.38%
None	63	4.03%
Jehovah's Witnesses	37	2.37%
Total	1564	

In year 2021 was 1564 people by religion 1228 from Roman Catholic Church, 178 from Greek Catholic Church, 63 from None, 37 from Jehovah's Witnesses, 13 from Other and not ascertained christian church, 11 from Not found out, 11 from Christian Congregations in Slovakia, 7 from Calvinist Church, 7 from Evangelical Church, 5 from Eastern Orthodox Church, 3 from Apostolic Church and 1 from Ad hoc movements.

== Genealogical resources ==
The records for genealogical research are available at the state archive "Statny Archiv in Levoca, Slovakia"
