= Matiašovce =

- Municipality
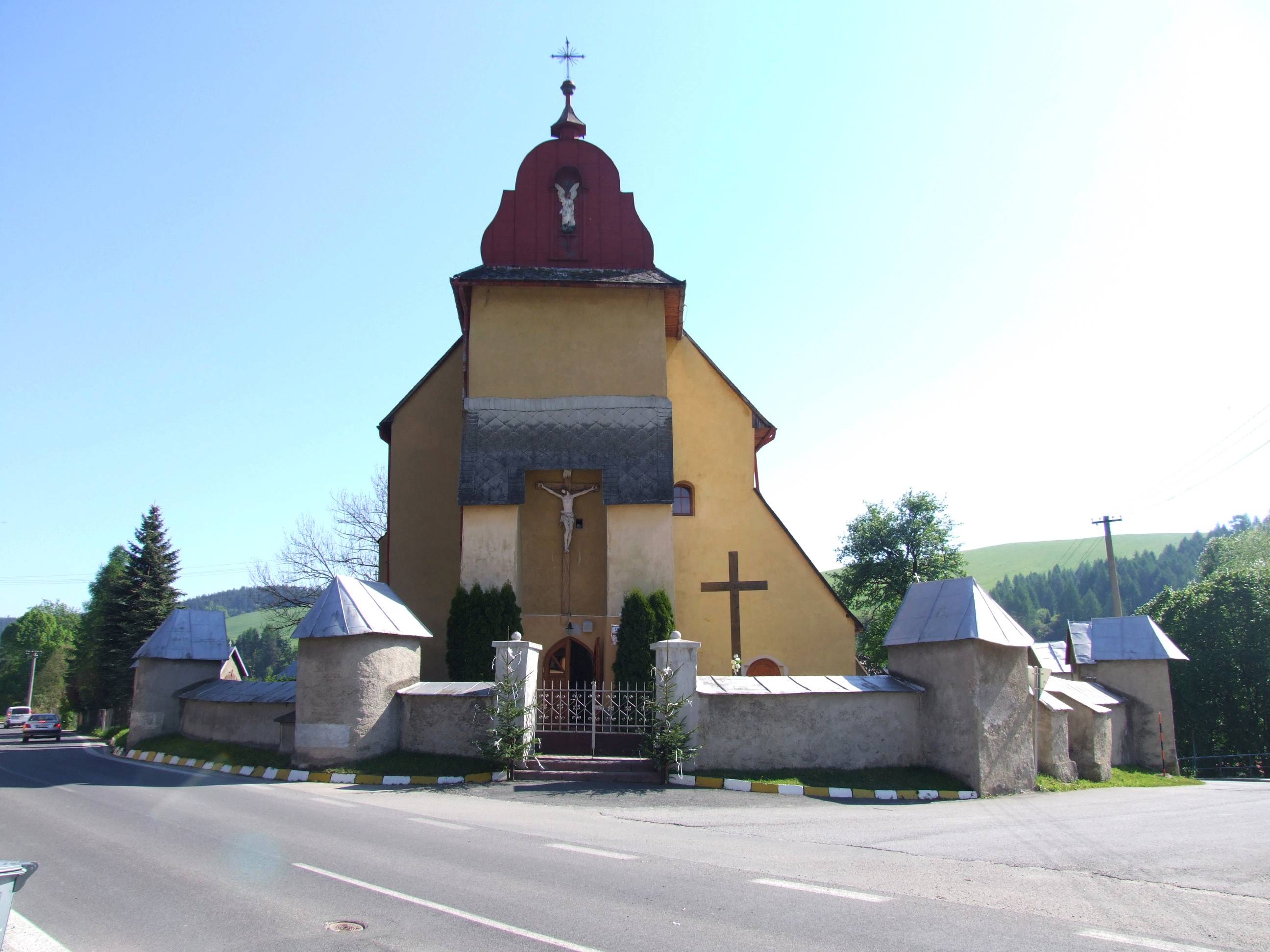

- Flag

- Location of Matiašovce in the Prešov Region Location of Matiašovce in Slovakia
- Coordinates: 49.35°N 20.36°E
- Country: Slovakia
- Region: Prešov Region
- District: Kežmarok District
- First mentioned: 1326

Area
  - Total: 17.50 km^{2} (6.76 sq mi)
- Elevation: 544 m (1,785 ft)

Population (2025)
  - Total: 866
- Time zone: UTC+1 (CET)
  - Summer (DST): UTC+2 (CEST)
- Postal code: 590 5
- Area code: +421 52
- Vehicle registration plate (until 2022): KK
- Website: www.matiasovce.sk

Matiašovce (Slovak pronunciation: [ˈmacɪɐʂɔwtse], Hungarian: Szepesmátyásfalva, German: Matshaus, Rusyn: Матьяшовце, Goral: Mačasovce, Polish: Maciaszowce) is a village and municipality in Kežmarok District in the Prešov Region of north Slovakia.

== History ==
In historical records the village was first mentioned in 1326. Before the establishment of independent Czechoslovakia in 1918, Matiašovce was part of Szepes County within the Kingdom of Hungary. From 1939 to 1945, it was part of the Slovak Republic. On 26 January 1945, the Red Army dislodged the Wehrmacht from Matiašovce and it was once again part of Czechoslovakia.

== Geography ==
The municipality lies at an altitude of 544 metres (1,785 ft) and covers an area of 17.50 km^{2} (6.76 sq mi) (2025).

== Population ==
Population statistic (10 years)
Year	1995	2005	2015	2025
Count	764	786	791	866
Difference		+2.87%	+0.63%	+9.48%

Population statistic
Year	2024	2025
Count	851	866
Difference		+1.76%

It has a population of 866 people (31 December 2025).

=== Ethnicity ===
Census 2021 (1+ %)
Ethnicity	Number	Fraction
Slovak	796	98.39%
Not found out	131	16.19%
Total	809	

In year 2021 was 809 people by ethnicity 796 as Slovak, 131 as Not found out, 7 as Polish, 6 as Romani, 5 as Other, 3 as Czech, 1 as Rusyn and 1 as German.

Note on population: The difference values of population numbers in the table "Population statistic" and in the sections "Ethnicity" & "Religion" is caused by the use of various statistical methods.

=== Religion ===
Census 2021 (1+ %)
Religion	Number	Fraction
Roman Catholic Church	743	91.84%
None	40	4.94%
Greek Catholic Church	9	1.11%
Total	809	

In year 2021 was 809 people by religion 743 from Roman Catholic Church, 40 from None, 9 from Greek Catholic Church, 6 from Not found out, 4 from Christian Congregations in Slovakia, 2 from Calvinist Church, 2 from Other and not ascertained christian church, 2 from Evangelical Church and 1 from Other.
