= Výborná =

- Municipality
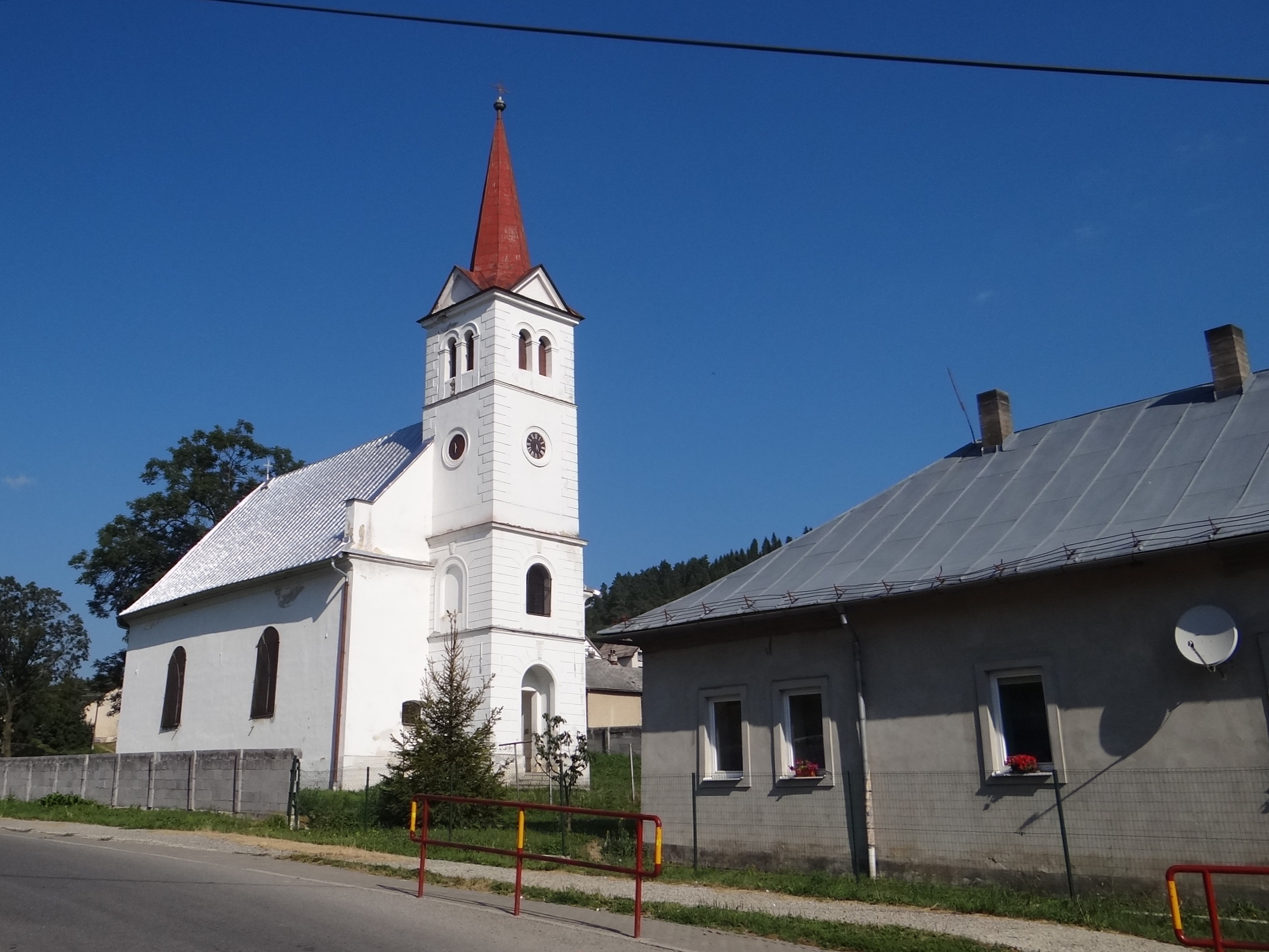

- Flag

- Location of Výborná in the Prešov Region Location of Výborná in Slovakia
- Coordinates: 49.23°N 20.40°E
- Country: Slovakia
- Region: Prešov Region
- District: Kežmarok District
- First mentioned: 1289

Area
  - Total: 10.54 km^{2} (4.07 sq mi)
- Elevation: 701 m (2,300 ft)

Population (2025)
  - Total: 1,469
- Time zone: UTC+1 (CET)
  - Summer (DST): UTC+2 (CEST)
- Postal code: 590 2
- Area code: +421 52
- Vehicle registration plate (until 2022): KK
- Website: www.obecvyborna.sk

Výborná (Hungarian: Sörkút, German: Bierbrunn, Rusyn: Віборна) is a village and municipality in Kežmarok District in the Prešov Region of north Slovakia.

== History ==
In historical records the village was first mentioned in 1289. Before the establishment of independent Czechoslovakia in 1918, Výborná was part of Szepes County within the Kingdom of Hungary. From 1939 to 1945, it was part of the Slovak Republic. On 27 January 1945, the Red Army dislodged the Wehrmacht from Výborná in the course of the Western Carpathian offensive and it was once again part of Czechoslovakia.

== Population ==
Population statistic (10 years)
Year	1995	2005	2015	2025
Count	690	935	1198	1469
Difference		+35.50%	+28.12%	+22.62%

Population statistic
Year	2024	2025
Count	1443	1469
Difference		+1.80%

It has a population of 1469 people (31 December 2025).

=== Ethnicity ===
Census 2021 (1+ %)
Ethnicity	Number	Fraction
Slovak	1294	98.32%
Romani	1116	84.8%
Not found out	22	1.67%
Total	1316	

In year 2021 was 1316 people by ethnicity 1294 as Slovak, 1116 as Romani, 22 as Not found out, 3 as Ukrainian, 2 as Polish and 1 as Rusyn.

Note on population: The difference values of population numbers in the table "Population statistic" and in the sections "Ethnicity" & "Religion" is caused by the use of various statistical methods.

=== Religion ===
Census 2021 (1+ %)
Religion	Number	Fraction
Roman Catholic Church	1288	97.87%
Total	1316	

In year 2021 was 1316 people by religion 1288 from Roman Catholic Church, 13 from None, 5 from Other and not ascertained christian church, 3 from Eastern Orthodox Church, 3 from Not found out, 3 from Greek Catholic Church and 1 from Christian Congregations in Slovakia.

The majority of the municipality's population consists of the members of the local Roma community. In 2019, they constituted an estimated 86% of the population.

== Geography ==
The municipality lies at an altitude of 701 metres (2,300 ft) and covers an area of 10.54 km^{2} (4.07 sq mi) (2025).
