= Reľov =

Village and municipality in Slovakia

- Municipality
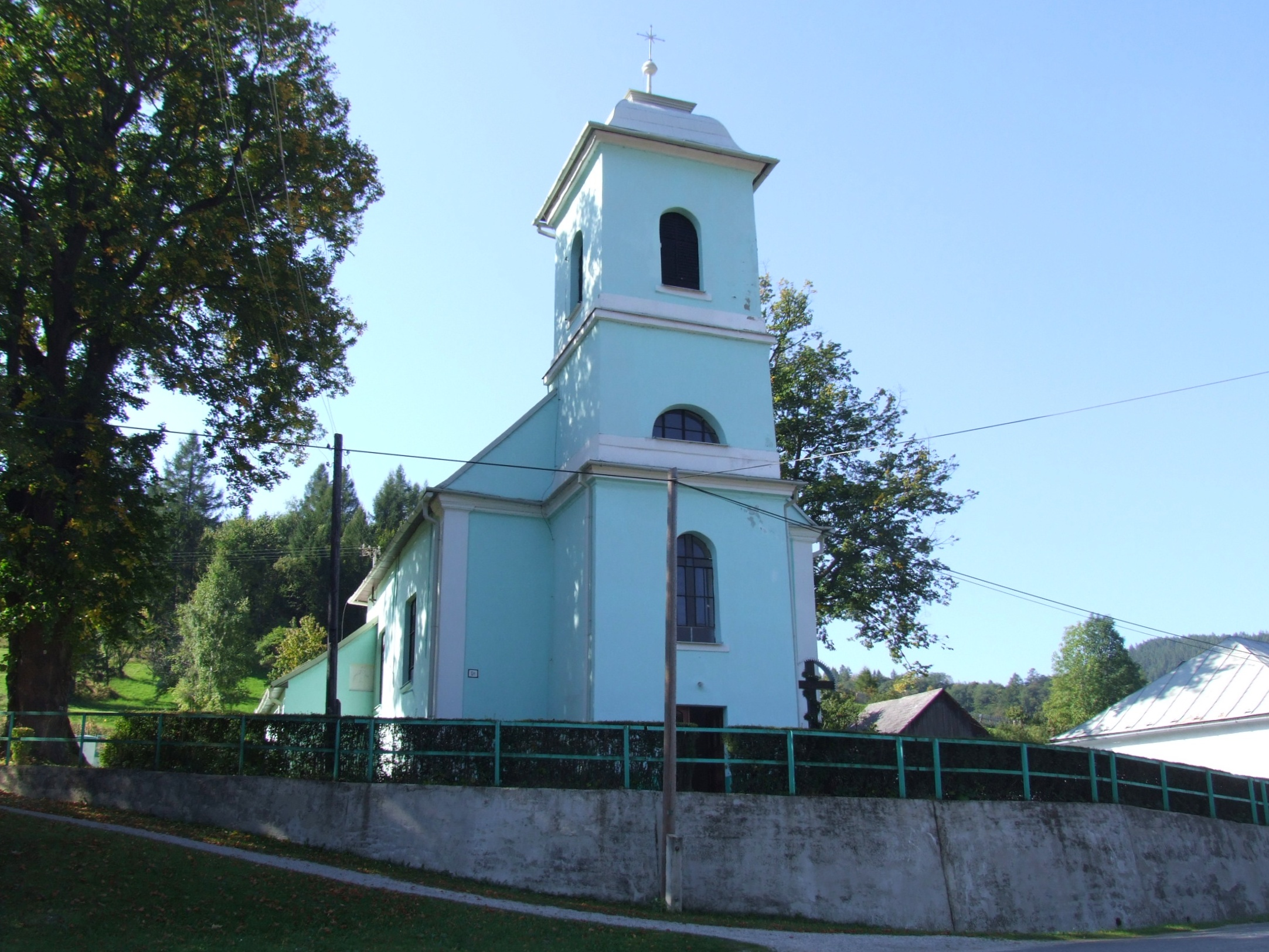

- Flag

- Location of Reľov in the Prešov Region Location of Reľov in Slovakia
- Coordinates: 49.30°N 20.38°E
- Country: Slovakia
- Region: Prešov Region
- District: Kežmarok District
- First mentioned: 1314

Area
  - Total: 14.99 km^{2} (5.79 sq mi)
- Elevation: 714 m (2,343 ft)

Population (2025)
  - Total: 332
- Time zone: UTC+1 (CET)
  - Summer (DST): UTC+2 (CEST)
- Postal code: 590 3
- Area code: +421 52
- Vehicle registration plate (until 2022): KK
- Website: www.relov.sk

Reľov (Hungarian: Relyó, German: Rillen, Rusyn: Релёв) is a village and municipality in Kežmarok District in the Prešov Region of north Slovakia.

== History ==
In historical records the village was first mentioned in 1288. Before the establishment of independent Czechoslovakia in 1918, Reľov was part of Szepes County within the Kingdom of Hungary. From 1939 to 1945, it was part of the Slovak Republic. On 27 January 1945, the Red Army dislodged the Wehrmacht from Reľov in the course of the Western Carpathian offensive and it was once again part of Czechoslovakia.

== Geography ==
The municipality lies at an altitude of 714 metres (2,343 ft) and covers an area of 14.99 km^{2} (5.79 sq mi) (2025).

== Population ==
Population statistic (10 years)
Year	1995	2005	2015	2025
Count	340	357	360	332
Difference		+5%	+0.84%	−7.77%

Population statistic
Year	2024	2025
Count	337	332
Difference		−1.48%

It has a population of 332 people (31 December 2025).

=== Ethnicity ===
Census 2021 (1+ %)
Ethnicity	Number	Fraction
Slovak	324	97.29%
Not found out	56	16.81%
Romani	4	1.2%
Total	333	

In year 2021 was 333 people by ethnicity 324 as Slovak, 56 as Not found out and 4 as Romani.

Note on population: The difference values of population numbers in the table "Population statistic" and in the sections "Ethnicity" & "Religion" is caused by the use of various statistical methods.

=== Religion ===
Census 2021 (1+ %)
Religion	Number	Fraction
Roman Catholic Church	309	92.79%
None	14	4.2%
Not found out	8	2.4%
Total	333	

In year 2021 was 333 people by religion 309 from Roman Catholic Church, 14 from None, 8 from Not found out, 1 from Calvinist Church and 1 from Ad hoc movements.
