= Zálesie, Kežmarok District =

Zálesie
- Municipality
- Flag

- Location of Zálesie in the Prešov Region Location of Zálesie in Slovakia
- Coordinates: 49.32°N 20.39°E
- Country: Slovakia
- Region: Prešov Region
- District: Kežmarok District
- First mentioned: 1520

Government
  - Mayor: Martin Klimek (SME-RODINA)

Area
  - Total: 4.78 km^{2} (1.85 sq mi)
- Elevation: 677 m (2,221 ft)

Population (2025)
  - Total: 84
- Time zone: UTC+1 (CET)
  - Summer (DST): UTC+2 (CEST)
- Postal code: 590 5
- Area code: +421 52
- Vehicle registration plate (until 2022): KK
- Website: zalesiezamagurie.sk

Zálesie (Slovak pronunciation: [ˈzaːlesɪe], Hungarian: Gibely, German: Giebel, Rusyn: Залесъє) is a village and municipality in Kežmarok District in the Prešov Region of north Slovakia.

== History ==
In historical records, the village was first mentioned in 1520. Before the establishment of independent Czechoslovakia in 1918, Zálesie was part of Szepes County within the Kingdom of Hungary. From 1939 to 1945, it was part of the Slovak Republic. On 27 January 1945, the Red Army dislodged the Wehrmacht from Zálesie in the course of the Western Carpathian offensive and it was once again part of Czechoslovakia.

== Geography ==
The municipality lies at an altitude of 677 metres (2,221 ft) and covers an area of 4.78 km^{2} (1.85 sq mi) (2025).

== Population ==
Population statistic (10 years)
Year	1995	2005	2015	2025
Count	96	98	87	84
Difference		+2.08%	−11.22%	−3.44%

Population statistic
Year	2024	2025
Count	83	84
Difference		+1.20%

It has a population of 84 people (31 December 2025).

=== Ethnicity ===
Census 2021 (1+ %)
Ethnicity	Number	Fraction
Slovak	84	100%
Not found out	13	15.47%
Total	84	

In year 2021 was 84 people by ethnicity 84 as Slovak and 13 as Not found out.

Note on population: The difference values of population numbers in the table "Population statistic" and in the sections "Ethnicity" & "Religion" is caused by the use of various statistical methods.

=== Religion ===
Census 2021 (1+ %)
Religion	Number	Fraction
Roman Catholic Church	79	94.05%
None	4	4.76%
Not found out	1	1.19%
Total	84	

In year 2021 was 84 people by religion 79 from Roman Catholic Church, 4 from None and 1 from Not found out.
