= Krížová Ves =

- Municipality
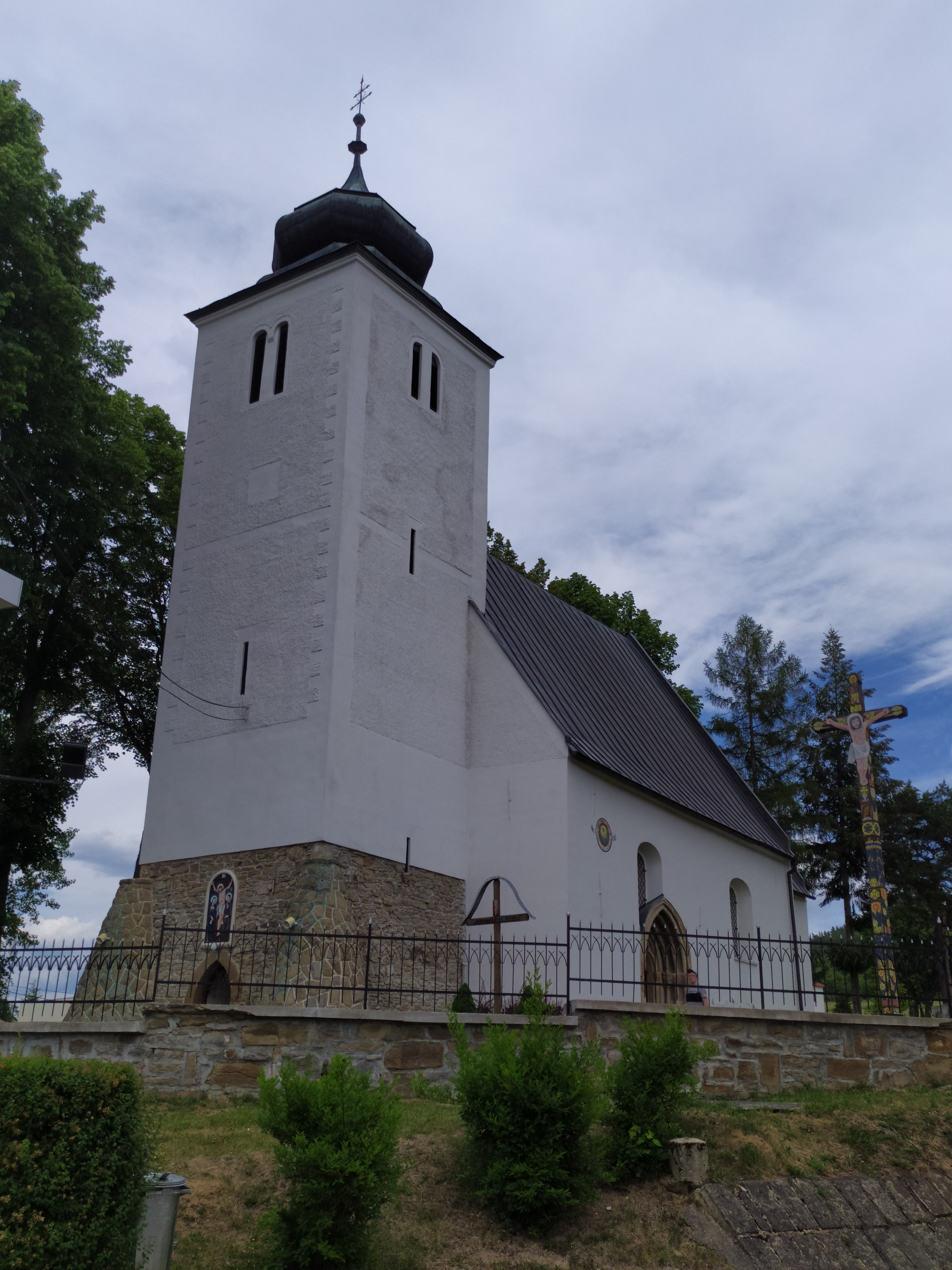

- Flag

- Location of Krížová Ves in the Prešov Region Location of Krížová Ves in Slovakia
- Coordinates: 49.19°N 20.49°E
- Country: Slovakia
- Region: Prešov Region
- District: Kežmarok District
- First mentioned: 1290

Area
  - Total: 11.92 km^{2} (4.60 sq mi)
- Elevation: 616 m (2,021 ft)

Population (2025)
  - Total: 2,468
- Time zone: UTC+1 (CET)
  - Summer (DST): UTC+2 (CEST)
- Postal code: 590 1
- Area code: +421 52
- Vehicle registration plate (until 2022): KK
- Website: www.krizovaves.sk

Krížová Ves (Hungarian: Keresztfalu, German: Kreuz, Rusyn: Кріжова Вес, Goral: Křizova Vješ) is a village and municipality in Kežmarok District in the Prešov Region of north Slovakia.

== History ==
In historical records the village was first mentioned in 1290. Before the establishment of independent Czechoslovakia in 1918, Krížová Ves was part of Szepes County within the Kingdom of Hungary. From 1939 to 1945, it was part of the Slovak Republic. On 27 January 1945, the Red Army dislodged the Wehrmacht from Krížová Ves in the course of the Western Carpathian offensive and it was once again part of Czechoslovakia.

== Geography ==
The municipality lies at an altitude of 616 metres (2,021 ft) and covers an area of 11.92 km^{2} (4.60 sq mi) (2025).

== Population ==
Population statistic (10 years)
Year	1995	2005	2015	2025
Count	1507	1764	2166	2468
Difference		+17.05%	+22.78%	+13.94%

Population statistic
Year	2024	2025
Count	2424	2468
Difference		+1.81%

It has a population of 2468 people (31 December 2025).

=== Ethnicity ===
Census 2021 (1+ %)
Ethnicity	Number	Fraction
Slovak	2179	95.52%
Romani	1588	69.61%
Not found out	66	2.89%
Total	2281	

In year 2021 was 2281 people by ethnicity 2179 as Slovak, 1588 as Romani, 66 as Not found out, 6 as Polish, 3 as Czech, 3 as German, 2 as Hungarian, 2 as Other, 1 as Ukrainian, 1 as Rusyn and 1 as Moravian.

Note on population: The difference values of population numbers in the table "Population statistic" and in the sections "Ethnicity" & "Religion" is caused by the use of various statistical methods.

The vast majority of the municipality's population consists of the local Roma community. In 2019, they constituted an estimated 70% of the local population.

=== Religion ===
Census 2021 (1+ %)
Religion	Number	Fraction
Roman Catholic Church	1826	80.05%
Christian Congregations in Slovakia	132	5.79%
Jehovah's Witnesses	116	5.09%
None	74	3.24%
Evangelical Church	51	2.24%
Other and not ascertained christian church	40	1.75%
Total	2281	

In year 2021 was 2281 people by religion 1826 from Roman Catholic Church, 132 from Christian Congregations in Slovakia, 116 from Jehovah's Witnesses, 74 from None, 51 from Evangelical Church, 40 from Other and not ascertained christian church, 16 from Not found out, 12 from Greek Catholic Church, 4 from Seventh-day Adventist Church, 2 from Calvinist Church, 2 from Other, 2 from Apostolic Church, 1 from Eastern Orthodox Church, 1 from Islam, 1 from United Methodist Church and 1 from Baptists Church.

According to 2010 census total population was 2008. In the village is sizeable Roma nationality, which had been claimed by 1249 inhabitants, which is 62% of the total population. In 2010 there had been 1008 males and 1000 females.

== Economy and infrastructure ==
In Krížová Ves are a football pitch, public library, elementary school, kindergarten, cable TV, foodstuff store and a general store. Cultural sightseeings are gothic Roman Catholic and evangelical churches and a Renaissance manor house.
