= Bušovce =

- Municipality
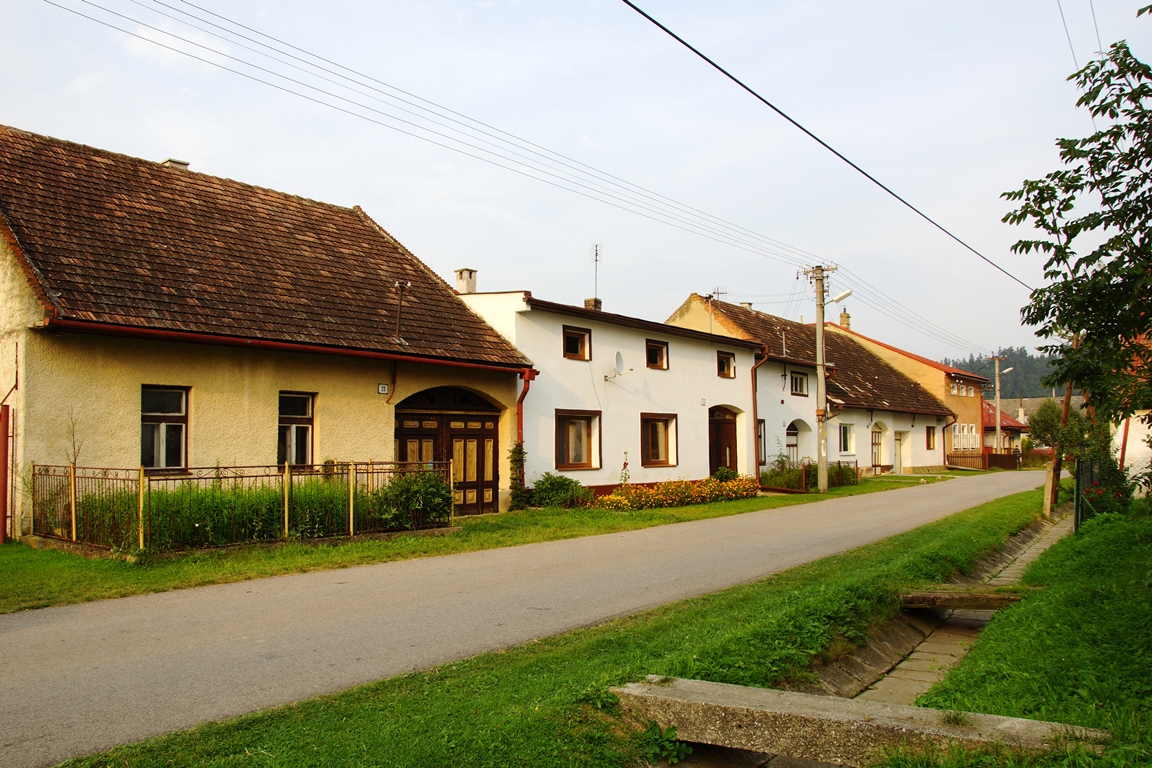

- Flag

- Location of Bušovce in the Prešov Region Location of Bušovce in Slovakia
- Coordinates: 49.22°N 20.48°E
- Country: Slovakia
- Region: Prešov Region
- District: Kežmarok District
- First mentioned: 1345

Area
  - Total: 9.03 km^{2} (3.49 sq mi)
- Elevation: 592 m (1,942 ft)

Population (2025)
  - Total: 296
- Time zone: UTC+1 (CET)
  - Summer (DST): UTC+2 (CEST)
- Postal code: 599 3
- Area code: +421 52
- Vehicle registration plate (until 2022): KK
- Website: www.obecbusovce.sk

Bušovce (German: Bauschendorf, Hungarian: Busóc, Rusyn: Бушовце) is a village and municipality in Kežmarok District in the Prešov Region of northern central Slovakia.

== Geography ==
The municipality lies at an altitude of 592 metres (1,942 ft) and covers an area of 9.03 km^{2} (3.49 sq mi) (2025).

== History ==
In historical records the village was first mentioned in 1286.

In 1910 the village had 441 mainly German inhabitants of Lutheran confession. It was part of the German language island of the Oberzips. Before the establishment of independent Czechoslovakia in 1918, Bušovce was part of Szepes County within the Kingdom of Hungary. From 1939 to 1945, it was part of the Slovak Republic. On 26 January 1945, the Red Army dislodged the Wehrmacht from Bušovce and it was once again part of Czechoslovakia. After the end of World War II the German population was expelled according to the Beneš decrees.

== Population ==
Population statistic (10 years)
Year	1995	2005	2015	2025
Count	320	326	306	296
Difference		+1.87%	−6.13%	−3.26%

Population statistic
Year	2024	2025
Count	292	296
Difference		+1.36%

It has a population of 296 people (31 December 2025).

=== Ethnicity ===
Census 2021 (1+ %)
Ethnicity	Number	Fraction
Slovak	288	94.73%
Not found out	17	5.59%
Total	304	

In year 2021 was 304 people by ethnicity 288 as Slovak, 17 as Not found out, 2 as Romani, 2 as Polish, 2 as German and 1 as Rusyn.

Note on population: The difference values of population numbers in the table "Population statistic" and in the sections "Ethnicity" & "Religion" is caused by the use of various statistical methods.

=== Religion ===
Census 2021 (1+ %)
Religion	Number	Fraction
Roman Catholic Church	261	85.86%
None	15	4.93%
Not found out	14	4.61%
Evangelical Church	9	2.96%
Total	304	

In year 2021 was 304 people by religion 261 from Roman Catholic Church, 15 from None, 14 from Not found out, 9 from Evangelical Church, 2 from Greek Catholic Church, 1 from Calvinist Church, 1 from Eastern Orthodox Church and 1 from Christian Congregations in Slovakia.

== Genealogical resources ==
The records for genealogical research are available at the state archive Statny Archiv in Levoca, Slovakia.

- Roman Catholic church records (births/marriages/deaths): 1673-1899 (parish A)
- Greek Catholic church records (births/marriages/deaths): 1822-1925 (parish B)

== See also ==
- List of municipalities and towns in Slovakia
