= Slovenská Ves =

- Municipality
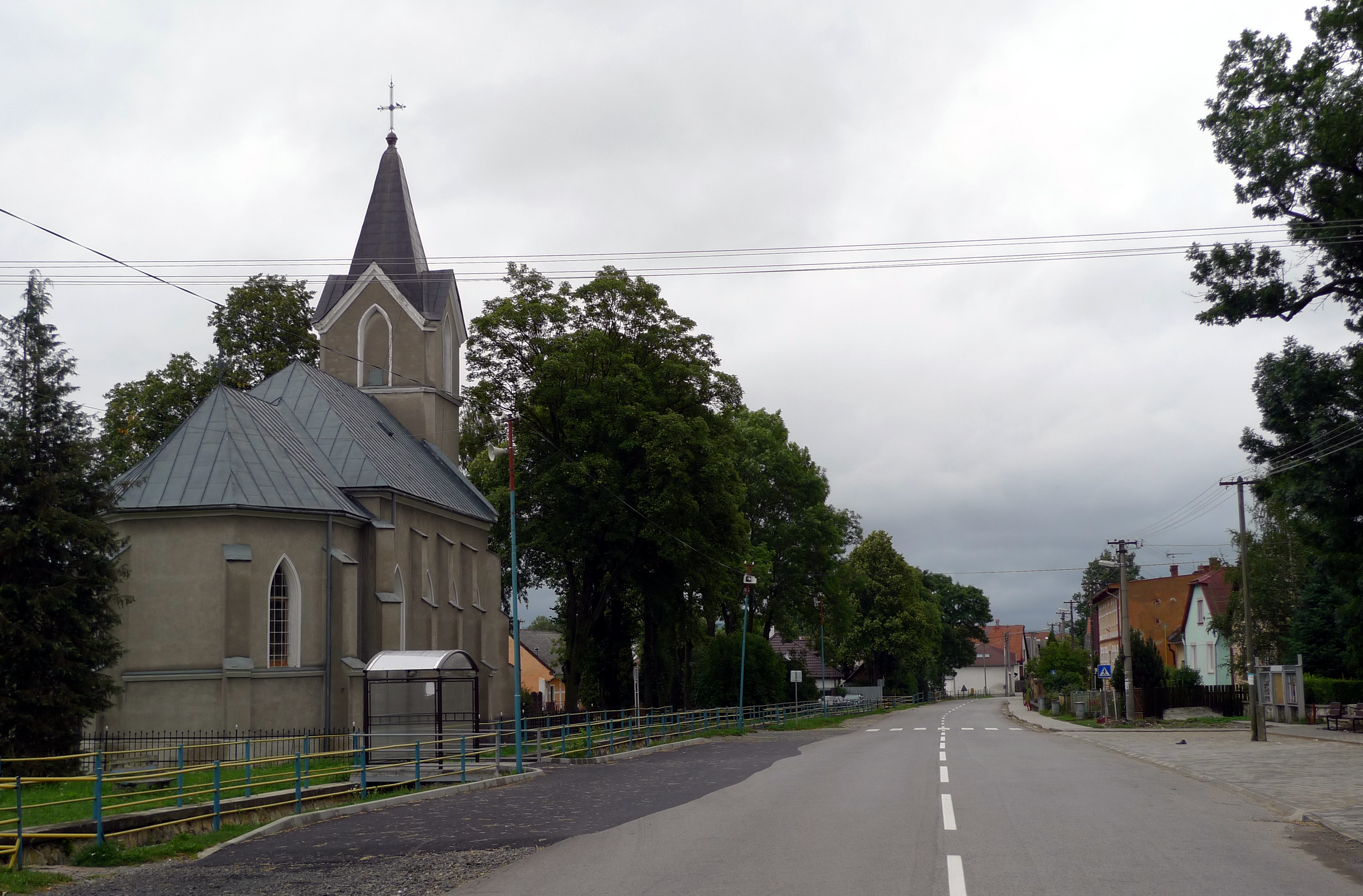

- Flag

- Location of Slovenská Ves in the Prešov Region Location of Slovenská Ves in Slovakia
- Coordinates: 49.23°N 20.43°E
- Country: Slovakia
- Region: Prešov Region
- District: Kežmarok District
- First mentioned: 1311

Area
  - Total: 22.44 km^{2} (8.66 sq mi)
- Elevation: 647 m (2,123 ft)

Population (2025)
  - Total: 1,859
- Time zone: UTC+1 (CET)
  - Summer (DST): UTC+2 (CEST)
- Postal code: 590 2
- Area code: +421 52
- Vehicle registration plate (until 2022): KK
- Website: www.slovenskaves.info

Slovenská Ves (Hungarian: Szepestótfalu; German: Windschendorf; Rusyn: Словенска Вес) is a village and municipality in Kežmarok District in the Prešov Region of north Slovakia.

== Geography ==
The municipality lies at an altitude of 647 metres (2,123 ft) and covers an area of 22.44 km^{2} (8.66 sq mi) (2025). It is located under the largest mountain in middle Europe called the Tatras, surrounded by lush forests, with a lot of natural wells, rich in mushrooms and berries, being as a living space for wild animals as a bear, deer or fox.

== Population ==
Population statistic (10 years)
Year	1995	2005	2015	2025
Count	1726	1816	1857	1859
Difference		+5.21%	+2.25%	+0.10%

Population statistic
Year	2024	2025
Count	1859	1859
Difference		+0%

It has a population of 1859 people (31 December 2025).

=== Ethnicity ===
Census 2021 (1+ %)
Ethnicity	Number	Fraction
Slovak	1814	96.54%
Romani	107	5.69%
Not found out	79	4.2%
Total	1879	

In year 2021 was 1879 people by ethnicity 1814 as Slovak, 107 as Romani, 79 as Not found out, 12 as Czech, 7 as Polish, 4 as Ukrainian, 2 as Rusyn, 2 as Austrian, 1 as German, 1 as Hungarian and 1 as Other.

Note on population: The difference values of population numbers in the table "Population statistic" and in the sections "Ethnicity" & "Religion" is caused by the use of various statistical methods.

=== Religion ===
Census 2021 (1+ %)
Religion	Number	Fraction
Roman Catholic Church	1557	82.86%
Evangelical Church	159	8.46%
None	94	5%
Not found out	34	1.81%
Total	1879	

In year 2021 was 1879 people by religion 1557 from Roman Catholic Church, 159 from Evangelical Church, 94 from None, 34 from Not found out, 15 from Greek Catholic Church, 7 from Ad hoc movements, 5 from Eastern Orthodox Church, 3 from Seventh-day Adventist Church, 1 from Christian Congregations in Slovakia, 1 from Other, 1 from Church of the Brethren, 1 from Buddhism and 1 from Bahá'i Community.

== History ==
In historical records, the village was first mentioned in 1311. Before the establishment of independent Czechoslovakia in 1918, Slovenská Ves was part of Szepes County within the Kingdom of Hungary. From 1939 to 1945, it was part of the Slovak Republic. On 27 January 1945, the Red Army dislodged the Wehrmacht from Slovenská Ves in the course of the Western Carpathian offensive and it was once again part of Czechoslovakia.

The main employment of the village population since its establishment was agricultural manufacture. The main crops were and still are wheat and potatoes. Because of large meadows on mountain roots, a sheep breeding was the next favorite activity.

== Gallery ==
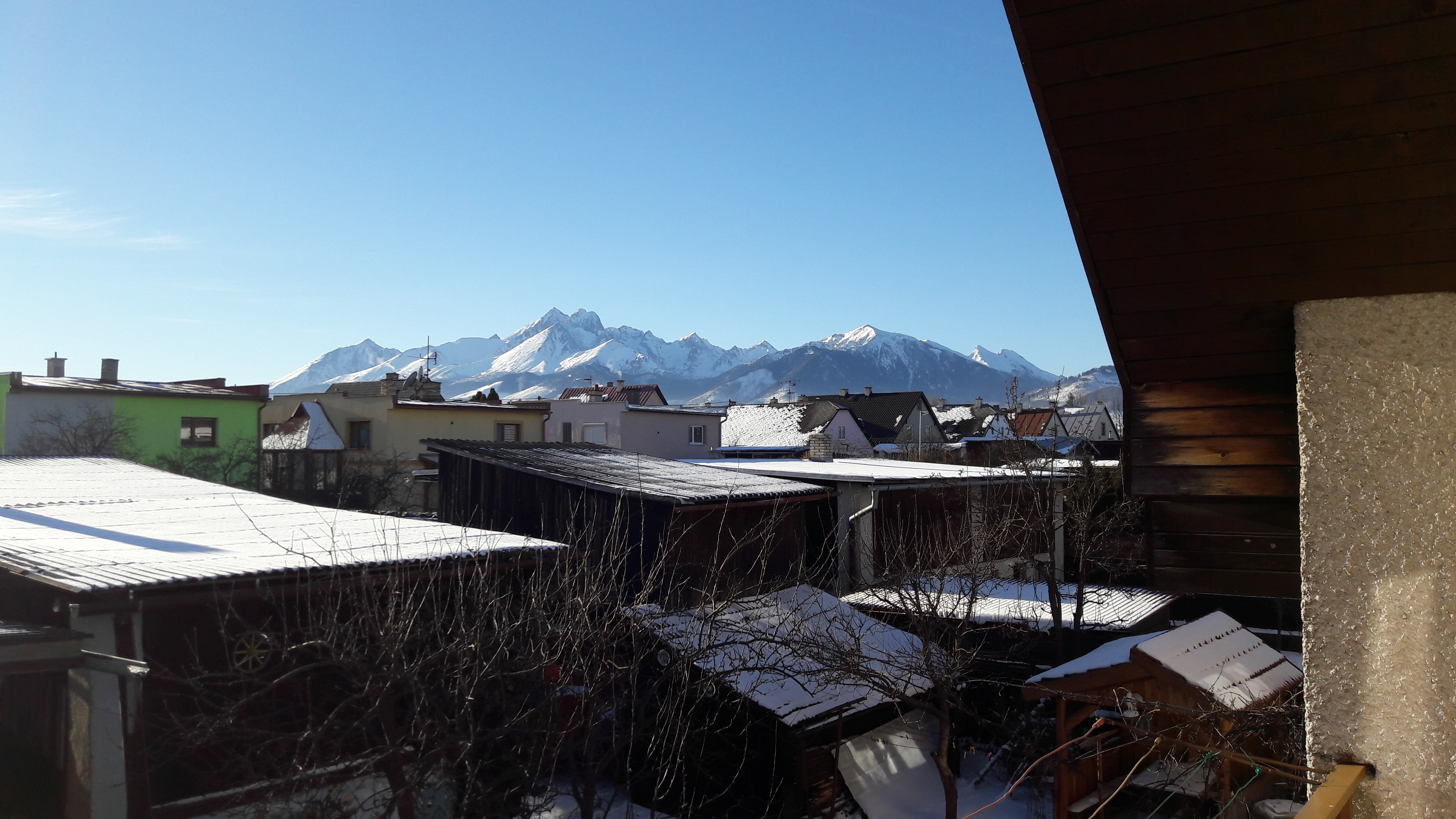
View of the Tatra Mountains from this village

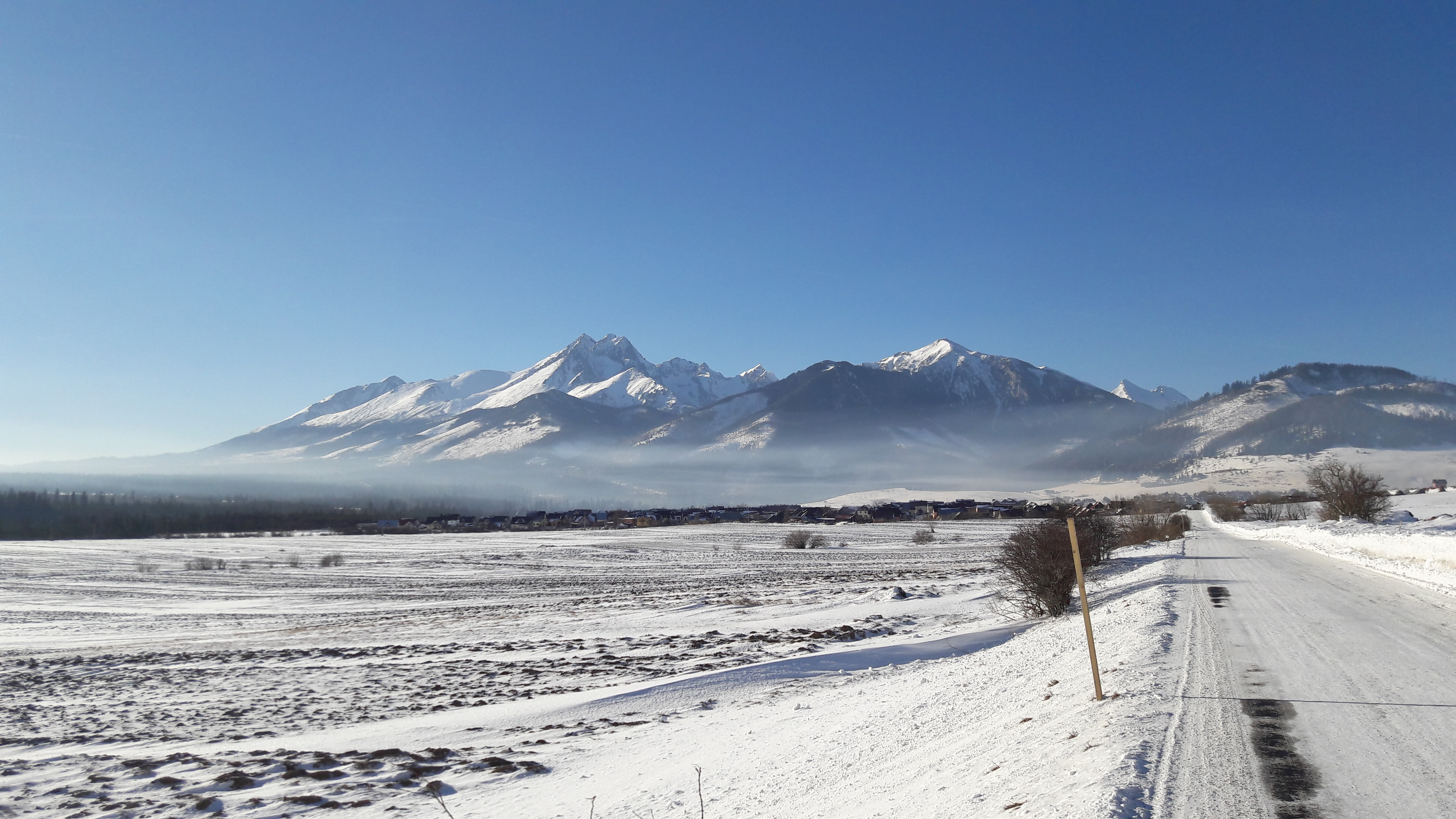
View on The Tatras Mountains from the village entry

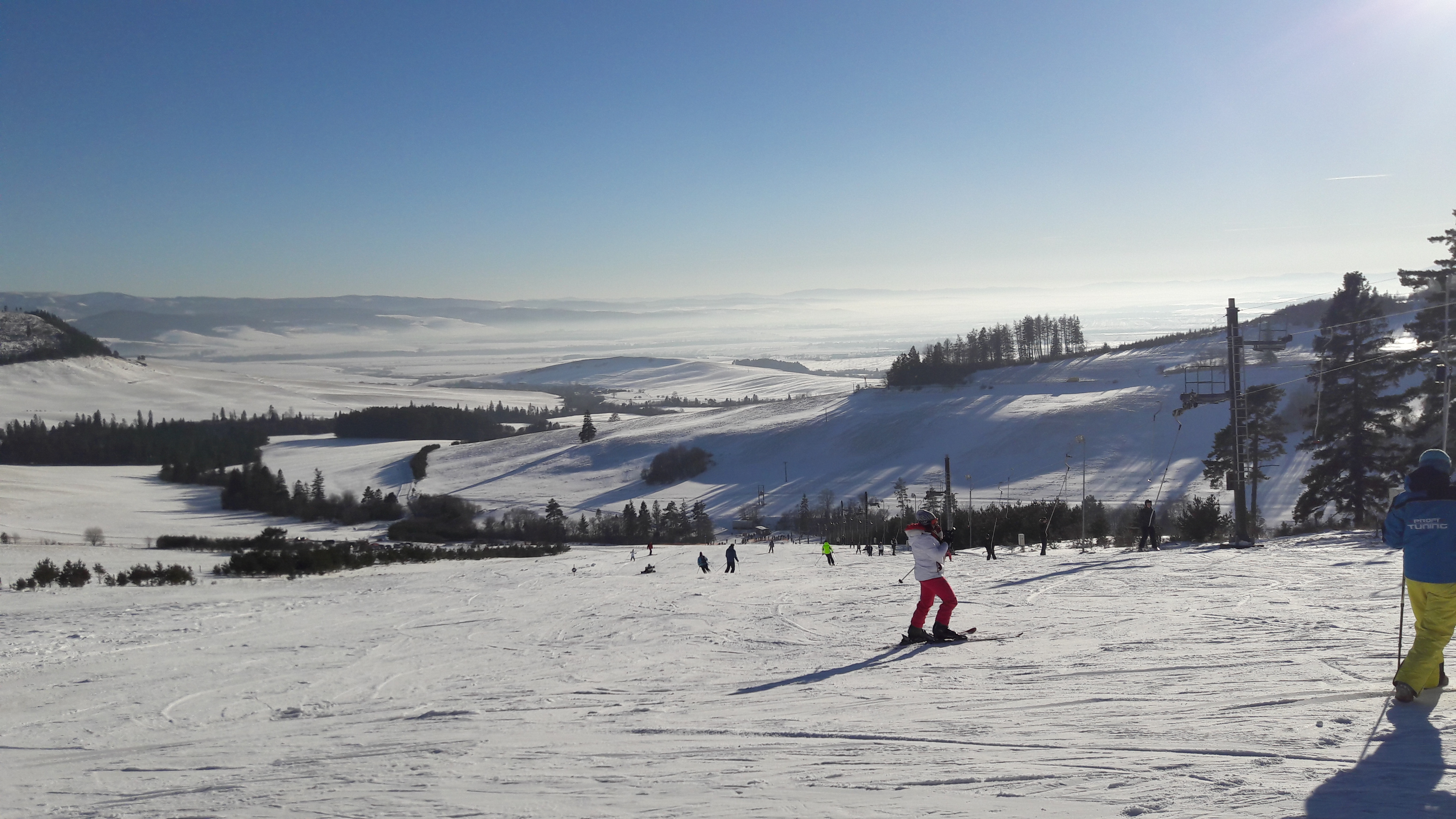
View on a ski slope near the village

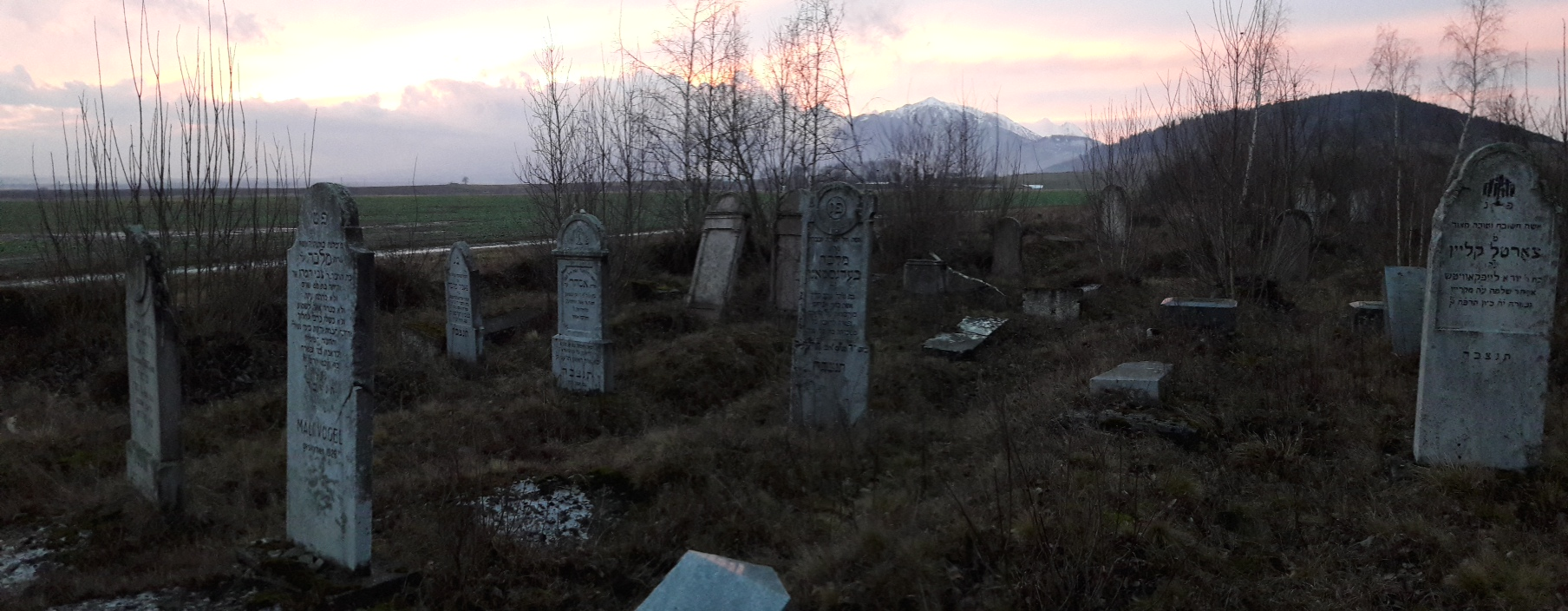
Jewish cemetery near the village

== Economy and infrastructure ==
In the village there are several sport clubs, like table tennis, or football. In Slovenská Ves there is also a ski lift and a gym hall. Gothic Roman Catholic church and a classistic manor house are the most important cultural attractions for sightseeing.

Near the village is located a Jewish cemetery which was being built before the second world war. It was restored few years ago and now serves as a worth memory for the next generations.

The area of the village location is called Spiš which isn't very densely populated. This is a big advantage for people enjoying free space and fresh air. The closest bigger city (population ↑15k) is 12 km far away, the village is a crossroad to the Tatras and to Poland.
