= Lechnica =

- Municipality
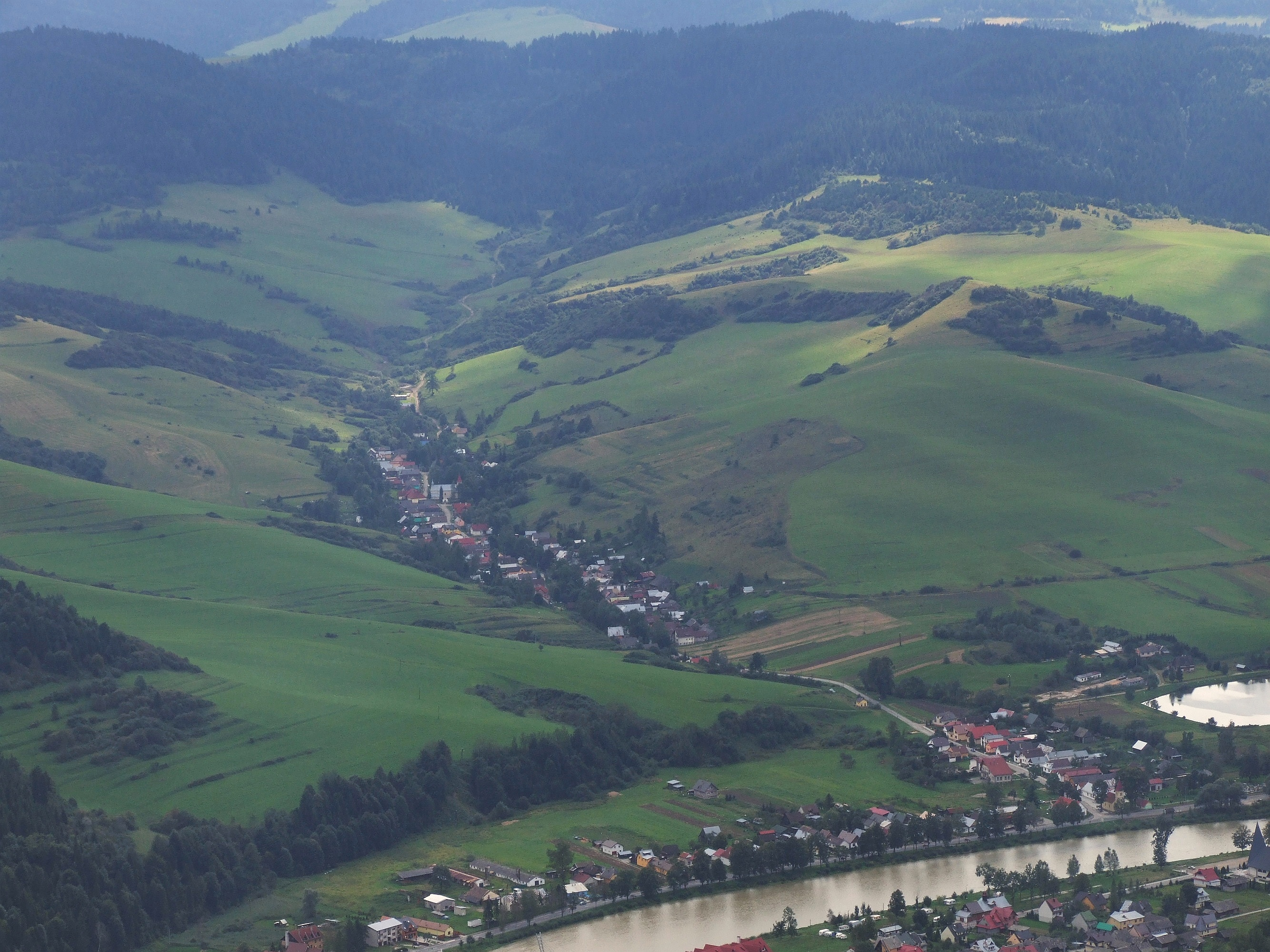
- Aerial view on Lehnica

- Flag

- Location of Lechnica in the Prešov Region Location of Lechnica in Slovakia
- Coordinates: 49.38°N 20.41°E
- Country: Slovakia
- Region: Prešov Region
- District: Kežmarok District
- First mentioned: 1319

Area
  - Total: 12.52 km^{2} (4.83 sq mi)
- Elevation: 485 m (1,591 ft)

Population (2025)
  - Total: 269
- Time zone: UTC+1 (CET)
  - Summer (DST): UTC+2 (CEST)
- Postal code: 590 6
- Area code: +421 52
- Vehicle registration plate (until 2022): KK
- Website: www.lechnica.sk

Lechnica (Hungarian: Lehnic, German: Lechnitz, Rusyn: Лехнїца) is a village and municipality in Kežmarok District in the Prešov Region of north Slovakia.

== History ==
In historical records the village was first mentioned in 1319. Before the establishment of independent Czechoslovakia in 1918, Lechnica was part of Szepes County within the Kingdom of Hungary. From 1939 to 1945, it was part of the Slovak Republic. On 26 January 1945, the Red Army dislodged the Wehrmacht from Lechnica and it was once again part of Czechoslovakia.

== Geography ==
The municipality lies at an altitude of 485 metres (1,591 ft) and covers an area of 12.52 km^{2} (4.83 sq mi) (2025).

== Population ==
Population statistic (10 years)
Year	1995	2005	2015	2025
Count	287	298	253	269
Difference		+3.83%	−15.10%	+6.32%

Population statistic
Year	2024	2025
Count	263	269
Difference		+2.28%

It has a population of 269 people (31 December 2025).

=== Ethnicity ===
Census 2021 (1+ %)
Ethnicity	Number	Fraction
Slovak	246	97.61%
Not found out	35	13.88%
Polish	10	3.96%
Czech	5	1.98%
Total	252	

In year 2021 was 252 people by ethnicity 246 as Slovak, 35 as Not found out, 10 as Polish, 5 as Czech, 1 as Rusyn, 1 as Russian and 1 as German.

Note on population: The difference values of population numbers in the table "Population statistic" and in the sections "Ethnicity" & "Religion" is caused by the use of various statistical methods.

=== Religion ===
Census 2021 (1+ %)
Religion	Number	Fraction
Roman Catholic Church	215	85.32%
None	21	8.33%
Not found out	6	2.38%
Greek Catholic Church	4	1.59%
Paganism and natural spirituality	3	1.19%
Total	252	

In year 2021 was 252 people by religion 215 from Roman Catholic Church, 21 from None, 6 from Not found out, 4 from Greek Catholic Church, 3 from Paganism and natural spirituality, 1 from Eastern Orthodox Church, 1 from Other and 1 from Ad hoc movements.
