= Abrahámovce, Kežmarok District =

Abrahámovce Ábrahámpikfalva
- Municipality
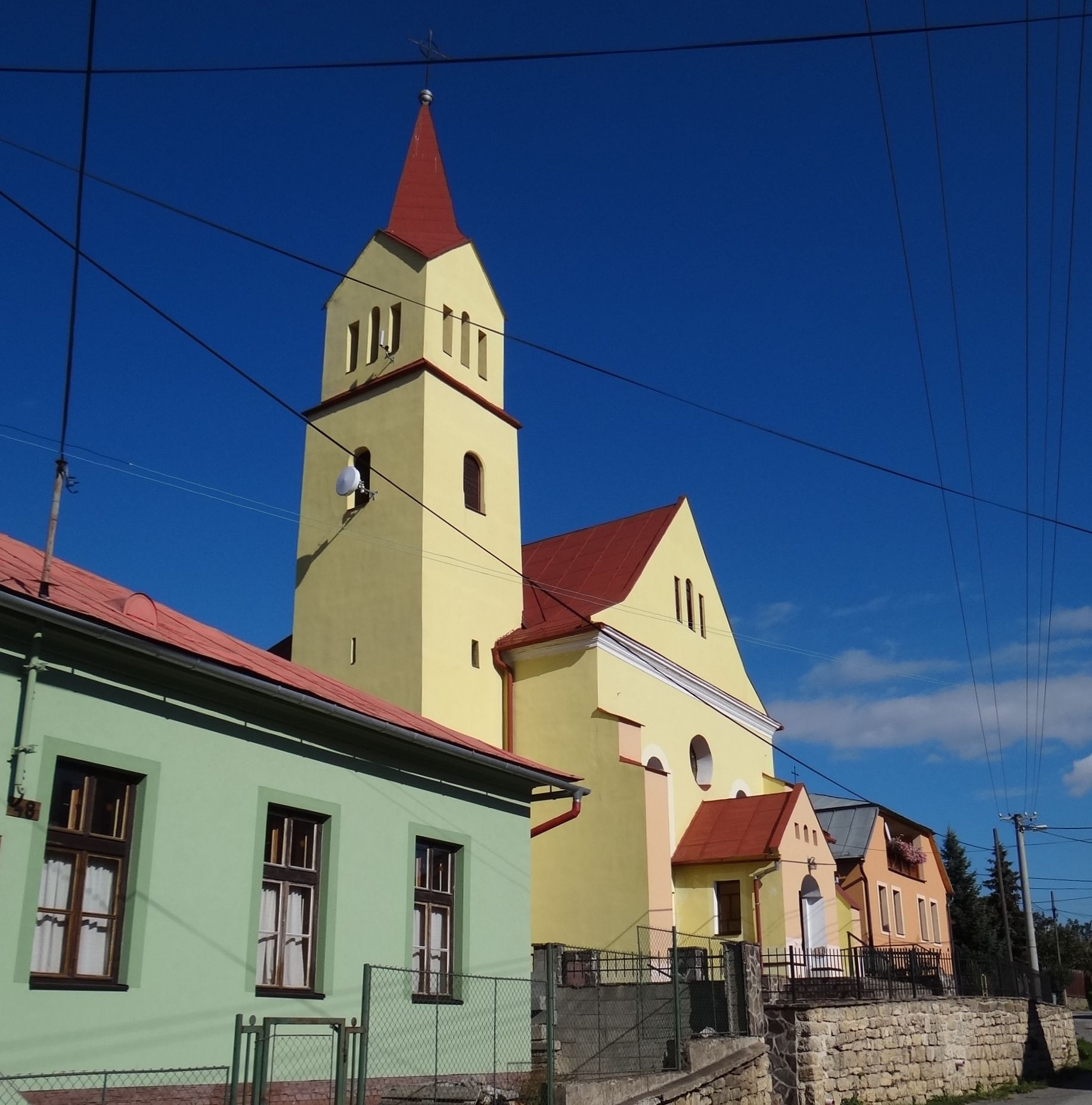

- Flag

- Location of Abrahámovce in the Prešov Region Location of Abrahámovce in Slovakia
- Coordinates: 49.04°N 20.44°E
- Country: Slovakia
- Region: Prešov Region
- District: Kežmarok District
- First mentioned: 1286

Area
  - Total: 6.65 km^{2} (2.57 sq mi)
- Elevation: 739 m (2,425 ft)

Population (2025)
  - Total: 262
- Time zone: UTC+1 (CET)
  - Summer (DST): UTC+2 (CEST)
- Postal code: 597 2
- Area code: +421 52
- Vehicle registration plate (until 2022): KK
- Website: www.abrahamovce.sk

Abrahámovce (Slovak pronunciation: [ˈabraɦaːmɔwtse]; 1952-1982 Abrahamovce, Hungarian: Ábrahámpikfalva, German: Abrahamsdorf) is a village and municipality in Kežmarok District in the Prešov Region of northern central Slovakia. In historical records the village was first mentioned in 1286. It is situated 12 km (7.5 mi) east from the district capital Kežmarok. The municipality lies at an altitude of 713 metres (2,339 ft) and covers an area of 6.653 km^{2} (2.569 sq mi). It has a population of about 225 people.

== History ==
In historical records, the village was first mentioned in 1288 (738 years ago).

The village was once part of the County of the Ten Lance-bearers (Sedes X lanceatorum), a historical autonomous administrative unit within the wider Spiš county. The County of the Ten Lance-bearers existed between the 12th century and 1802, when it merged with the Spiš county proper.

== Population ==
Population statistic (10 years)
Year	1995	2005	2015	2025
Count	211	230	262	262
Difference		+9.00%	+13.91%	+0%

Population statistic
Year	2024	2025
Count	263	262
Difference		−0.38%

It has a population of 262 people (31 December 2025).

=== Ethnicity ===
Census 2021 (1+ %)
Ethnicity	Number	Fraction
Slovak	248	99.2%
Not found out	3	1.2%
Total	250	

In year 2021 was 250 people by ethnicity 248 as Slovak and 3 as Not found out.

Note on population: The difference values of population numbers in the table "Population statistic" and in the sections "Ethnicity" & "Religion" is caused by the use of various statistical methods.

=== Religion ===
Census 2021 (1+ %)
Religion	Number	Fraction
Roman Catholic Church	211	84.4%
None	27	10.8%
Greek Catholic Church	6	2.4%
Not found out	3	1.2%
Evangelical Church	3	1.2%
Total	250	

In year 2021 was 250 people by religion 211 from Roman Catholic Church, 27 from None, 6 from Greek Catholic Church, 3 from Not found out and 3 from Evangelical Church.

== Economy and Infrastructure ==
The village is situated in a halfway between Poprad and Spišská Nová Ves. In Abrahámovce, there is a kindergarten, grocery store, public library, football pitch and a pub. Important local sights include the rococo church, reconstructed in the second half of the 18th century. One part of Abrahámovce consists of the recreational cottage settlement Píkovce, with about 30 holiday chalets.

== Genealogical resources ==
The records for genealogical research are available at the Spiš archive in Levoča (Slovak: Spišský archív v Levoči).

- Roman Catholic church records (births/marriages/deaths): 1696-1898 (parish A)
- Greek Catholic church records (births/marriages/deaths): 1877-1925
- Census records 1869 of Abrahamovce are available at the state archive.

== See also ==
- List of municipalities and towns in Slovakia
