= Jezersko, Kežmarok District =

Jezersko
- Municipality
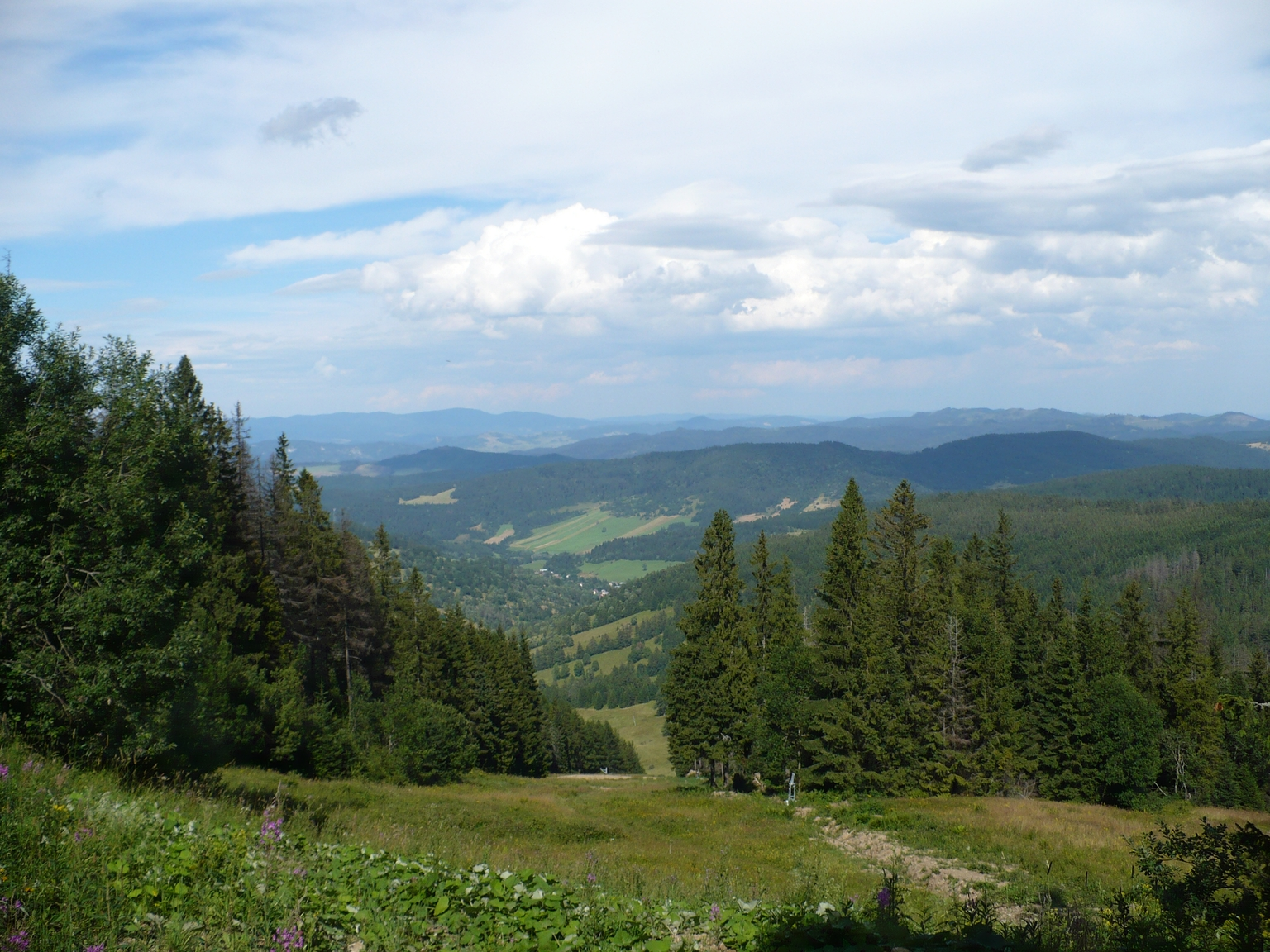
- View on the village in Jezersko valley

- Flag

- Location of Jezersko in the Prešov Region Location of Jezersko in Slovakia
- Coordinates: 49.30°N 20.33°E
- Country: Slovakia
- Region: Prešov Region
- District: Kežmarok District
- First mentioned: 1611

Area
  - Total: 7.78 km^{2} (3.00 sq mi)
- Elevation: 795 m (2,608 ft)

Population (2025)
  - Total: 75
- Time zone: UTC+1 (CET)
  - Summer (DST): UTC+2 (CEST)
- Postal code: 590 4
- Area code: +421 52
- Vehicle registration plate (until 2022): KK
- Website: obec.jezersko.sk

Jezersko (Hungarian: Tavas, German: Teichenau, Rusyn: Єзерско) is a village and municipality in Kežmarok District in the Prešov Region of north Slovakia.

== Geography ==
The municipality lies at an altitude of 795 metres (2,608 ft) and covers an area of 7.78 km^{2} (3.00 sq mi) (2025).

== History ==
In historical records the village was first mentioned in 1611. Before the establishment of independent Czechoslovakia in 1918, Jezersko was part of Szepes County within the Kingdom of Hungary. From 1939 to 1945, it was part of the Slovak Republic. On 27 January 1945, the Red Army dislodged the Wehrmacht from Jezersko in the course of the Western Carpathian offensive and it was once again part of Czechoslovakia.

== Population ==
Population statistic (10 years)
Year	1995	2005	2015	2025
Count	103	118	104	75
Difference		+14.56%	−11.86%	−27.88%

Population statistic
Year	2024	2025
Count	74	75
Difference		+1.35%

It has a population of 75 people (31 December 2025).

=== Ethnicity ===
Census 2021 (1+ %)
Ethnicity	Number	Fraction
Slovak	73	96.05%
Not found out	6	7.89%
Czech	4	5.26%
Polish	2	2.63%
Jewish	1	1.31%
Other	1	1.31%
Croatian	1	1.31%
Total	76	

In year 2021 was 76 people by ethnicity 73 as Slovak, 6 as Not found out, 4 as Czech, 2 as Polish, 1 as Jewish, 1 as Other and 1 as Croatian.

Note on population: The difference values of population numbers in the table "Population statistic" and in the sections "Ethnicity" & "Religion" is caused by the use of various statistical methods.

=== Religion ===
Census 2021 (1+ %)
Religion	Number	Fraction
Roman Catholic Church	66	86.84%
None	5	6.58%
Not found out	2	2.63%
Other	2	2.63%
Ad hoc movements	1	1.32%
Total	76	

In year 2021 was 76 people by religion 66 from Roman Catholic Church, 5 from None, 2 from Not found out, 2 from Other and 1 from Ad hoc movements.

== Genealogical resources ==
The records for genealogical research are available at the state archive "Statny Archiv in Levoca, Slovakia"

- Roman Catholic church records (births/marriages/deaths): 1787-1897 (parish B)

== See also ==
- List of municipalities and towns in Slovakia
