= Abrahámovce, Bardejov District =

Abrahámovce Ábrahámfalva
- Municipality
- Flag Coat of arms

- Location of Abrahámovce in the Prešov Region Location of Abrahámovce in Slovakia
- Coordinates: 49.22°N 21.32°E
- Country: Slovakia
- Region: Prešov Region
- District: Bardejov District
- First mentioned: 1427

Area
  - Total: 5.89 km^{2} (2.27 sq mi)
- Elevation: 267 m (876 ft)

Population (2025)
  - Total: 324
- Time zone: UTC+1 (CET)
  - Summer (DST): UTC+2 (CEST)
- Postal code: 864 3
- Area code: +421 54
- Vehicle registration plate (until 2022): BJ
- Website: abrahamovce-bj.sk

Abrahámovce (Rusyn: Абрагамовцї, romanized: Abragamovtsï, Ukrainian: Абрагамовце, romanized: Abragamovtse, Hungarian: Ábrahámfalva) is a village and municipality in Bardejov District in the Prešov Region of north-east Slovakia. The municipality lies at an altitude of 265 metres and covers an area of 5.899 km^{2}. It has a population of about 342 people. The village is about 99% Slovak. It has a public library and a football pitch.

== Names and etymology ==
The name comes from a Slavic personal name Obran; later it was incorrectly associated with the biblical Abraham. In the 15th–16th centuries the name was recorded as Abranfalua (one record), Abran (the most frequent version) or Abraham (only from the second half of the 16th century).

== Population ==
Population statistic (10 years)
Year	1995	2005	2015	2025
Count	355	363	370	324
Difference		+2.25%	+1.92%	−12.43%

Population statistic
Year	2024	2025
Count	321	324
Difference		+0.93%

It has a population of 324 people (31 December 2025).

=== Ethnicity ===
Census 2021 (1+ %)
Ethnicity	Number	Fraction
Slovak	333	98.81%
Total	337	

In year 2021 was 337 people by ethnicity 333 as Slovak, 3 as Czech, 3 as Not found out, 2 as Russian, 1 as Hungarian and 1 as Other.

Note on population: The difference values of population numbers in the table "Population statistic" and in the sections "Ethnicity" & "Religion" is caused by the use of various statistical methods.

=== Religion ===
Census 2021 (1+ %)
Religion	Number	Fraction
Evangelical Church	168	49.85%
Roman Catholic Church	156	46.29%
None	6	1.78%
Total	337	

In year 2021 was 337 people by religion 168 from Evangelical Church, 156 from Roman Catholic Church, 6 from None, 3 from Not found out, 2 from Apostolic Church, 1 from Eastern Orthodox Church and 1 from Greek Catholic Church.

== See also ==
- List of municipalities and towns in Slovakia

== Genealogical resources ==
The records for genealogical research are available at the state archive in Prešov (Slovak: Štátny archív v Prešove).

- Roman Catholic church records (births/marriages/deaths): 1732-1895
- Greek Catholic church records (births/marriages/deaths): 1800-1895
- Lutheran church records (births/marriages/deaths): 1732-1895
- Census records 1869 of Abrahamovce are available at the state archive.
