= Spišské Hanušovce =

- Municipality
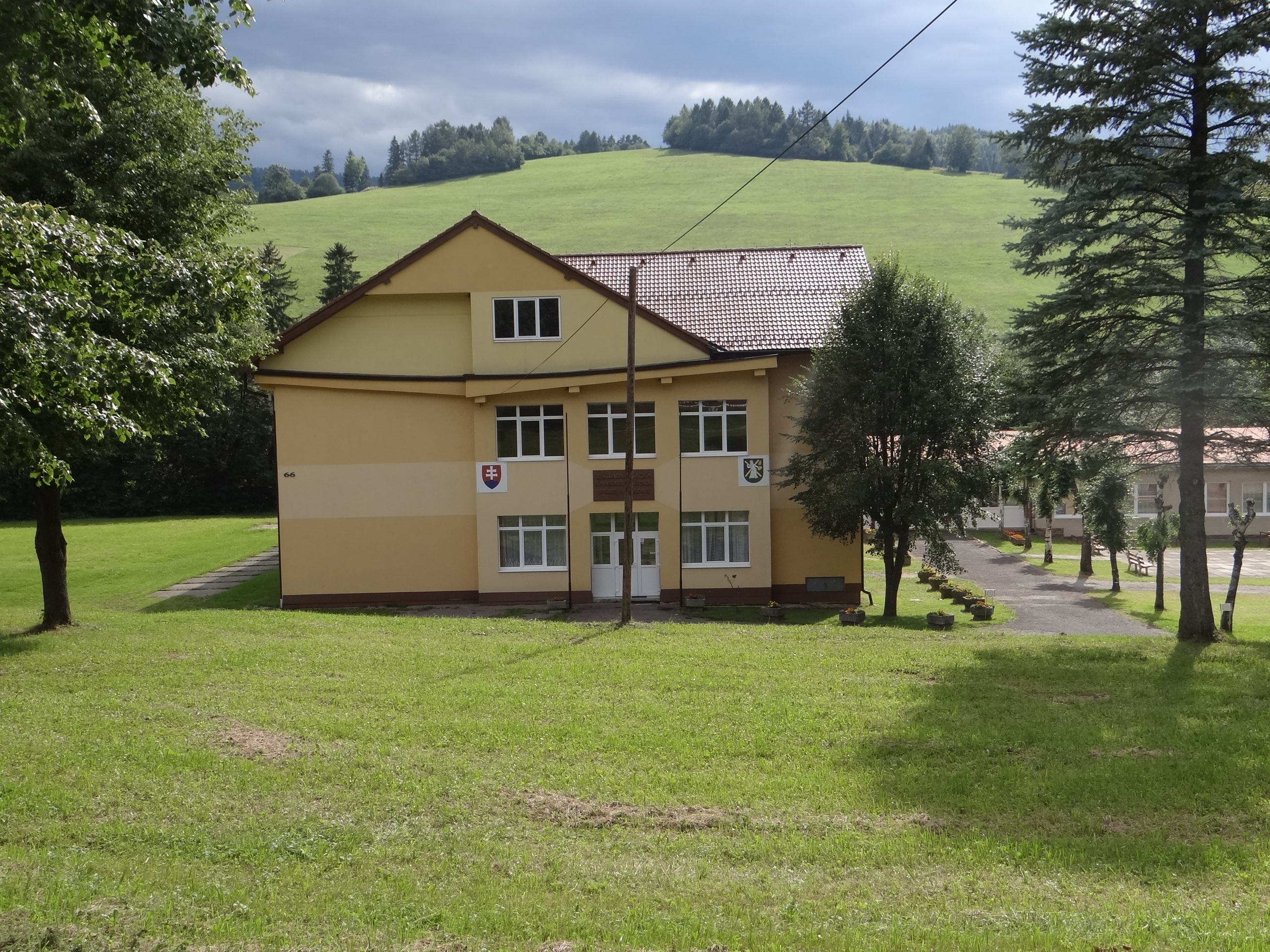

- Flag

- Location of Spišské Hanušovce in the Prešov Region Location of Spišské Hanušovce in Slovakia
- Coordinates: 49.33°N 20.34°E
- Country: Slovakia
- Region: Prešov Region
- District: Kežmarok District
- First mentioned: 1313

Area
  - Total: 14.29 km^{2} (5.52 sq mi)
- Elevation: 593 m (1,946 ft)

Population (2025)
  - Total: 769
- Time zone: UTC+1 (CET)
  - Summer (DST): UTC+2 (CEST)
- Postal code: 590 4
- Area code: +421 52
- Vehicle registration plate (until 2022): KK
- Website: spisskehanusovce.sk

Spišské Hanušovce (Slovak pronunciation: [ˈspiʂskeː ˈɦanuʂɔwtse], Hungarian: Hanusfalva, German: Henschau, Rusyn: Спіське Ганушовце) is a village and municipality in Kežmarok District in the Prešov Region of north Slovakia.

== Geography ==
The municipality lies at an altitude of 593 metres (1,946 ft) and covers an area of 14.29 km^{2} (5.52 sq mi) (2025).

== History ==
In historical records the village was first mentioned in 1313. Locals have been engaged in forestry and sawmilling. Before the establishment of independent Czechoslovakia in 1918, Spišské Hanušovce was part of Szepes County within the Kingdom of Hungary. From 1939 to 1945, it was part of the Slovak Republic. On 27 January 1945, the Red Army dislodged the Wehrmacht from Spišské Hanušovce in the course of the Western Carpathian offensive and it was once again part of Czechoslovakia.

== Population ==
Population statistic (10 years)
Year	1995	2005	2015	2025
Count	667	661	769	769
Difference		−0.89%	+16.33%	+0%

Population statistic
Year	2024	2025
Count	781	769
Difference		−1.53%

It has a population of 769 people (31 December 2025).

=== Ethnicity ===
Census 2021 (1+ %)
Ethnicity	Number	Fraction
Slovak	762	97.56%
Not found out	104	13.31%
Total	781	

In year 2021 was 781 people by ethnicity 762 as Slovak, 104 as Not found out, 6 as Romani, 6 as Polish, 5 as Other, 4 as Rusyn, 2 as Czech and 1 as German.

Note on population: The difference values of population numbers in the table "Population statistic" and in the sections "Ethnicity" & "Religion" is caused by the use of various statistical methods.

=== Religion ===
Census 2021 (1+ %)
Religion	Number	Fraction
Roman Catholic Church	720	92.19%
None	25	3.2%
Greek Catholic Church	16	2.05%
Total	781	

In year 2021 was 781 people by religion 720 from Roman Catholic Church, 25 from None, 16 from Greek Catholic Church, 6 from Not found out, 5 from Other and not ascertained christian church, 4 from Evangelical Church, 2 from Christian Congregations in Slovakia, 2 from Other and 1 from Ad hoc movements.

== Economy and infrastructure ==
The proximity of Pieniny and High Tatras touristic areas have developed tourism in the village. There are several ski slopes nearby. In the village, there is an ice hockey club.
