= Adalbert Gabriel =

German physician and politician (1907–1958)

Adalbert Gabriel (5 April 1907 – 1958) was a Zipser German physician and politician.

== Biography ==
Gabriel was born on 5 April 1907 in Zipser Bela. He was the son of a trader. He received his middle and secondary schooling in Käsmark. He went on to study Medicine in Prague. He studied two semesters at the Institut für Grenz- und Auslanddeutschtum in Marburg.

Soon after passing his matriculation exams, Gabriel emerged as a political activist. In Zipser German politics of the interbellum years, Gabriel represented a younger generation criticizing the traditional pro-Magyar position of the community.

He was a key leader of the Boberhaus movement in Löwenberg in Schlesien. In 1927 he became a member of the Carpathian German People's Council. In the run-up to the 1929 Czechoslovak parliamentary election Gabriel was a founding member of the Carpathian German Party.

Following the 1938 Munich Agreement Gabriel was named as District Leader of the German Party in the Zips autonomous district, District Head Physician in of the Carpathian German Medical College and member of Freiwillige Schutzstaffel paramilitary organization. By presidential decree, on 20 November 1941 Gabriel was appointed as a member of the Assembly of the Slovak Republic representing the German community. He was a member of the Transport Committee of the parliament. According to Czechoslovak sources, in his role as Transport Committee member Gabriel actively supported deportations of the Jewish population of Slovakia.

In the final phase of World War II, Gabriel fled to Germany. Details on his later years are reportedly sketchy, supposedly he was included in a list of war criminals wanted by the Czechoslovak authorities. He reportedly lived in East Germany after the war, where he would have worked as a physician.

Gabriel died in 1958.
