= Michal Greisiger =

Slovak physician and naturalist (1851–1912)

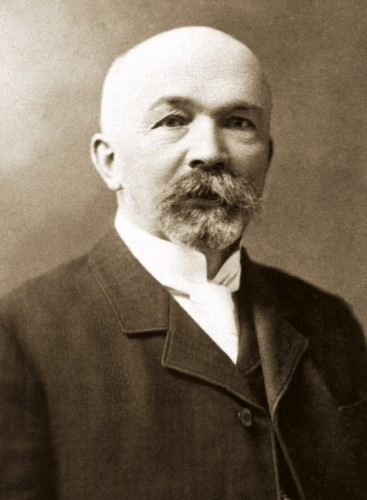
Michal Greisiger (d. 1912)

Michal Greisiger (25 December 1851 – 10 September 1912) was a Slovak-German physician and naturalist. He explored the fauna and flora of the Tatra and Szepes, studied paleontology and archaeology, and worked on public health measures

Greisiger was born in Stráne pod Tatrami to farmers Mihály and Mária Faix, where he also attended school. He studied at Kežmarok before joining the University of Vienna in 1872. In the meantime, he worked as a private tutor before eventually returning to study medicine. In 1877 Greisiger received his medical degree from Budapest. Following this, he became a physician in Spišská Belá, later becoming the city medical officer. He was involved in medical care for the poor, public health measures against alcoholism and smoking; and began to assemble a herbal garden in the region. Along with this, he began to study the local birds, fauna and history. He collected fossils in the Tatra mountains and later explored the Belianska Cave where he discovered a blind springtail that was named after him as Lipura greisigeri. Many of his specimen collections are now held in the museums of Keszthely and Poprad.

Greisiger married Helén Lersch and they had four daughters, including the botanist Irma Juliana who was involved in the design of the water supply and sewage system in Spišská Belá. He was a member of the Austro-Hungarian ornithological association from 1881 and was a founding member of the Hungarian Carpathian Association.
