= Carpathian German Medical College =

Karpatendeutsche Ärzteschaft ('Carpathian German Medical College') was an organization of Carpathian German physicians in the World War II-era Slovak Republic. The organization was incorporated into the People's Welfare and People's Health Department (Amt für Volkswohlfahrt und Volksgesundheit) of the German Party.

In Bratislava, Karpatendeutsche Ärzteschaft ran a clinic on Sládkovičova ulica. Dr. Adalbert Gabriel was the Head Physician of Karpatendeutsche Ärzteschaft in the Zips District.
