= Zipser German =

Germanic dialect developed in Slovakia

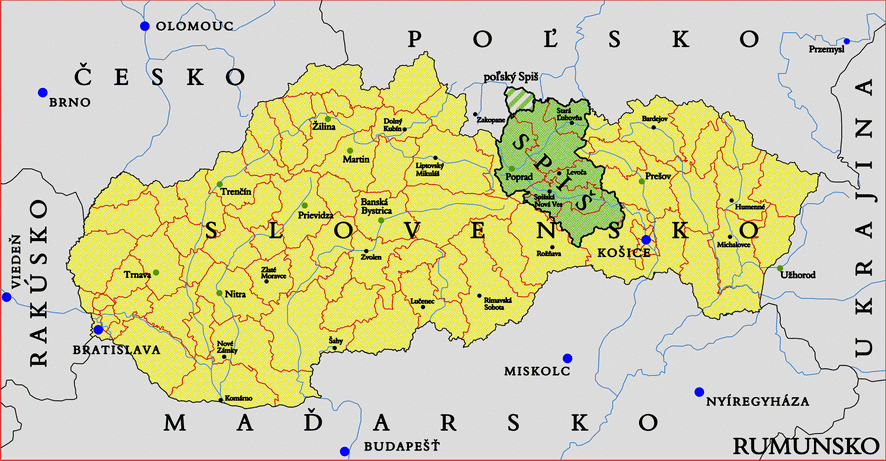
Map depicting the location of the Spiš/Zips region in northeastern contemporary Slovakia.

Zipser German (German: Zipserisch or Zipserdeutsch; Hungarian: szepességi szász nyelv or cipszer nyelv; Romanian: dialectul țipțer) is a dialect of the German language which developed in the Upper Zips region (Slovak: Spiš, Hungarian: Szepes) of what is now northeastern Slovakia among people who settled there from present-day central Germany and the northern Lower Rhine river (e.g. contemporary Flanders and Luxembourg) beginning in the 13th century (or during the High Middle Ages as part of the Ostsiedlung).

These German settlers are collectively known as Zipser Germans in Central and Eastern Europe and part of the Carpathian Germans (German: Karpatendeutsche) in their native Slovakia. The Lower Zips was inhabited by other Germans who spoke a different dialect called "Gründlerisch". The Upper Zipser German dialect is also close or related to the Transylvanian Saxon dialect (German: Siebenbürgisch-Sächsisch) of the Transylvanian Saxons (German: Siebenbürger Sachsen).

The Zipser German dialect has been spoken for centuries in present-day Slovakia and Romania. In Romania, the dialect has been spoken in the historical regions of Bukovina and Maramureș, northern Transylvania. Nowadays there are a few Zipser German-speaking communities in southern Bukovina (more specifically Suceava County) as well as Maramureș County. In addition, there are several differences between the forms of the Zipser German dialect which had developed on the territory of present-day Romania and the main Zipser German dialect from Zips, Slovakia. In Maramureș, the main community of Zipser Germans (and, by extension, Zipser German speakers) still lives in Vișeu de Sus (German: Oberwischau) and Baia Mare (German: Frauenbach or Groß-Neustadt). Smaller communities of Zipser Germans are also found in the mountainous Banat or Caraș-Severin County. There are also sparse communities of Zipser Germans across Carpathian Ruthenia (i.e. Zakarpattia Oblast), Ukraine.

== The Zipser German dialect as spoken in Romania ==
Beginning in at least the 18th century, many Zipsers migrated to contemporary northern Romania, including to southern Bukovina (present-day Suceava County), then part of the Habsburg-ruled lands and a newly acquired land following the Russo-Turkish War (1768–1774), where several other German dialects were also spoken by the local Bukovina German community (such as Swabian, for example).

Throughout the passing of time, the speech of the Zipsers in present-day Romania (such as those who migrated to Maramureș, present-day Maramureș County) was heavily influenced by that of people from Upper Austria (German: Oberösterreich) who settled among them and were ultimately assimilated into the Zipser ethnic community. During and after the Second World War, most Zipsers evacuated or were expelled to Germany, but a community of speakers remains in Hopgarten (Slovak: Chmeľnica); their distinctive dialect is called "Outzäpsersch" (German: "Altzipserisch", literally "Old Zipserish").

== Dialectal differences in Bukovina, Romania ==
The dialect spoken in Bukovina (more specifically in southern Bukovina or Suceava County, northeastern Romania), Gründlerisch in origin, was characterized by the shift of original (Middle High German) /v/ to /b/ and of original /b/ to /p/. The dialect of Hopgarten distinctively shifts Middle High German /l/, in all positions, to 'u'. In southern Bukovina, the Zipser German dialect has been spoken in rural areas such as in the communes of Cârlibaba (German: Mariensee, Ludwigsdorf, or Kirlibaba), Iacobeni (German: Jakobeny), Pojorâta (German: Pozoritta or Poschoritta), or Vama (German: Wama).
