= Zipser Germans =

Ethnic subgroup in central-eastern Europe

German: Zipser, Zipser Deutsche, and/or Zipser Sachsen
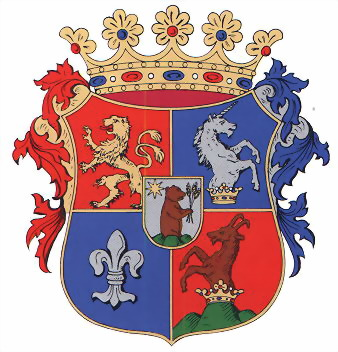
- The coat of arms of the former Szepes County, Upper Hungary, Kingdom of Hungary, where the Zipser Saxons were settled during the High Middle Ages

Regions with significant populations
- Slovakia and Romania (more specifically in present-day Suceava County, Bukovina, northeastern Romania as well as Maramureș in northern Transylvania)

Languages
- German (with the Zipser German dialect)

Religion
- Catholicism and Lutheranism

Related ethnic groups
- Germans, Germans of Romania (including, most notably, Transylvanian Saxons and Bukovina Germans), German diaspora, Austrians, Flemings, or Luxembourgers
- Native to Central-Eastern Europe, more specifically to present-day Spiš region, north-eastern Slovakia (since the High Middle Ages onwards) as well as Bukovina and Maramureș, Romania (since the Modern Age onwards).

The Zipser Germans, Zipser Saxons, or, simply, just Zipsers (German: Zipser or Zipser Deutsche, Romanian: Țipțeri, Hungarian: Cipszer, Cipszerek, or Szepességi szászok, Slovak: Spišskí Nemci) are a German-speaking (more specifically Zipser German-speaking as native dialect) sub-ethnic group in Central-Eastern Europe, part of the German diaspora, and national minority in both Slovakia and Romania (there are also Zipser German settlements in the Zakarpattia Oblast, in the historical region of Carpathian Ruthenia, present-day western Ukraine). Along with the Sudeten Germans (German: Sudetendeutsche), the Zipser Germans were one of the two most important ethnic German groups in the former Czechoslovakia. An occasional variation of their name as 'Tzipsers' can also be found in academic articles. Former Slovak President Rudolf Schuster is partly Zipser German and grew up in Medzev (German: Metzenseifen).

The Zipser Germans were previously native to the Szepes County (German: Zips; Slovak: Spiš, Hungarian: Szepes) of Upper Hungary—today mostly north-eastern Slovakia—as that region was settled by colonists from present-day central Germany (and other parts of contemporary Germany) during the High Middle Ages, more specifically beginning in the mid 12th century, as part of the Ostsiedlung. Beginning in at least the 18th century, many members of this German ethnic sub-group migrated to southern Bukovina, Maramureș, Transylvania, and in the mountainous Banat (all of the aforementioned regions situated in contemporary Romania). Most of the Zipser German community in Romania lives in Maramureș County and across the Rodna Mountains respectively.

Occasionally, Zipser Germans are also referred to as Zipser Saxons (Hungarian: szepesi szászok or szepességi szászok, German: Zipser Sachsen), a name stemming from their geographic origin of initial settlement during medieval times corresponding to the present-day Spiš (German: Zips) region situated in north-eastern Slovakia. The county (German: Komitat) where they settled in the beginning is known in Hungarian as 'Szepes'. Alongside the Transylvanian Saxons in Transylvania, contemporary central Romania, and the Baltic Germans from Estonia and Latvia, the Zipser Germans are one of the three oldest German-speaking and ethnic German groups in Central and Eastern Europe, having continuously been living there since the High Middle Ages onwards.

The Zipser Germans can also be equated with the Germans of Slovakia (German: Slowakeideutsche) and are part of the broader group of Carpathian Germans (German: Karpatendeutsche), having chiefly been referred to as such along with the Germans of Carpathian Ruthenia since the end of World War II onwards. They are also part of the Germans of Romania. The small community of Zipsers still living in Suceava County, southern Bukovina, Romania, can be perceived as part of the Bukovina German community as well, in the greater sense that is.

== Medieval history ==
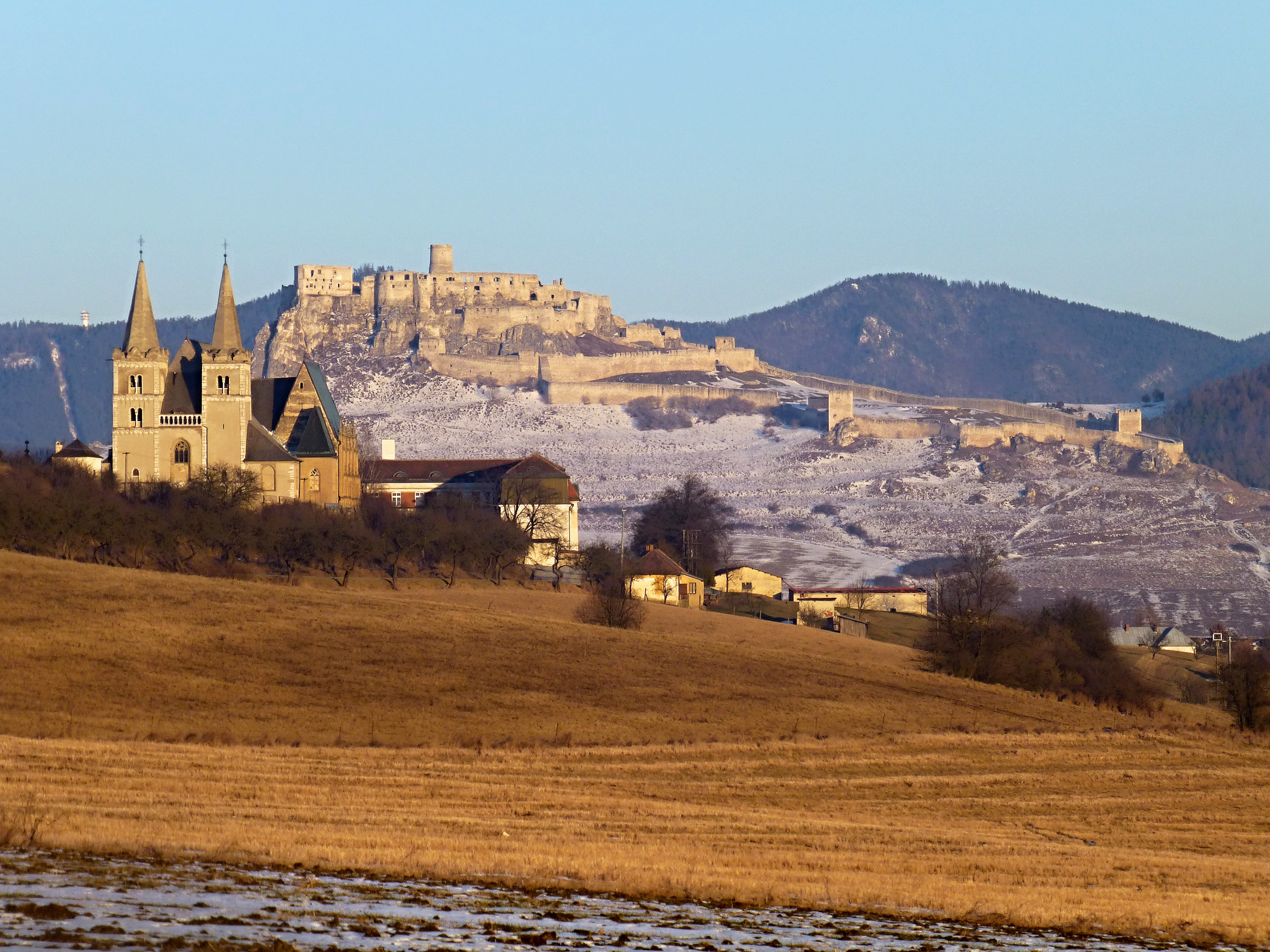
Spišská Kapitula (German: Zipser Kapitel) and Spiš Castle (German: Zipser Burg), as seen in winter time.

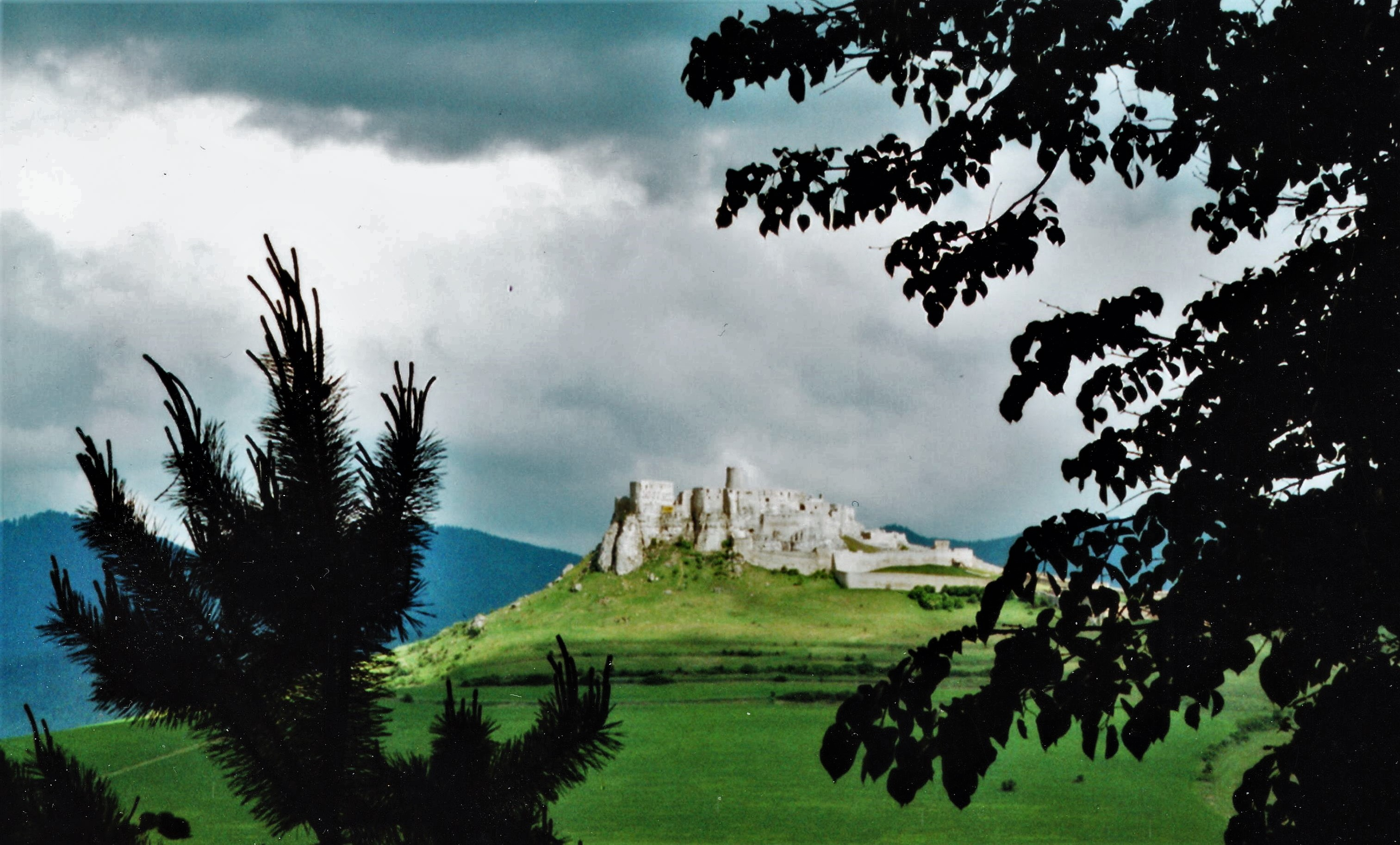
The iconic Spišský hrad (German: Zipser Burg), one of the most well preserved medieval castles in Central Europe and a historical landmark of the Spiš region.

German settlers were invited to settle in the Spiš region across the High Tatras, present-day Slovakia, then Szepes County (German: Komitat Zips) of Upper Hungary in the Kingdom of Hungary, beginning in the mid 12th century by former King of Hungary Géza II of Hungary. These settlers' occupations ranged from miners and traders to builders. The last wave of German colonists arrived during the 15th century, towards the end of the Middle Ages (or the Late Middle Ages).

As in the cases of other historical regions from Central and Eastern Europe, this migration of German settlers at the invitation of local kings (known as Ostsiedlung in German historiography) from several Central-Eastern European countries had the main goal to enrich the local medieval communities with more trade and urbanization as well as to fortify them in the wake of the Mongol invasion (as did the Transylvanian Saxons in Transylvania, another former region of the Kingdom of Hungary during the Middle Ages).

In the particular case of present-day Slovakia, these German settlers stemmed from lower Rhine river valley (including present-day Luxembourg), Flanders, Saxony, and Silesia (in present-day south-eastern Poland). They governed themselves under the Zipser Willkür, a particular medieval German law (more specifically German town law) which they developed there under a certain degree of local autonomy provided by the Hungarian monarch. Zipser Willkür is the oldest form of German law from Slovakia.

In the passing of time, as in the case of other local communities in Central-Eastern Europe colonized with ethnic Germans during the Middle Ages, these newly arrived German settlers became the dominant class and the majority ethnic group in the towns and villages they had either founded or re-populated (as other settlements were previously founded by Slovaks). They eventually became collectively known as Zipser Germans given the fact that they helped develop Szepes County. They are sometimes referred to as Zipser Saxons (German: Zipser Sachsen) as well. As in the case of the Transylvanian Saxons in Transylvania (another Central-Eastern European historical region which previously belonged to the medieval Kingdom of Hungary), the Zipser Germans founded imposing castles and fortified urban settlements.

== Modern period history ==
During the modern period, as it was the case of other ethnic German groups from non-native German Central and Eastern European countries, the population of Zipser Germans gradually declined on the territory of contemporary Slovakia. Zipser German populations were still significant in several parts of central Slovakia though, but not as significant as they once were during the Middle Ages (both in absolute numbers and in social status). They also underwent forced Magyarization during the 19th century.

Beginning in at least the 18th century, many Zipser Germans from the territory of present-day Slovakia emigrated southward to Habsburg-ruled and, later on, Austrian-ruled Bukovina (Romanian: Bucovina) and also to Maramureș, where they established or intermixed in already established Romanian rural settlements but also settled in the towns. Many of them were miners, both in Bukovina and in Maramureș.

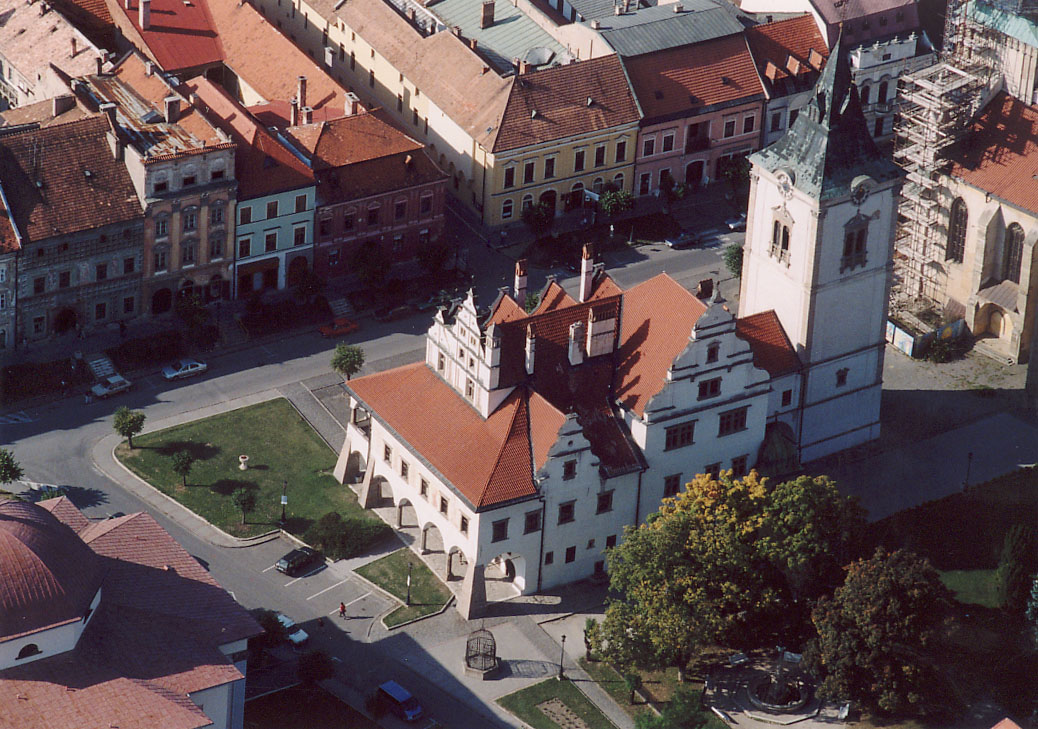
The historical town centre of Levoča (German: Leutschau)

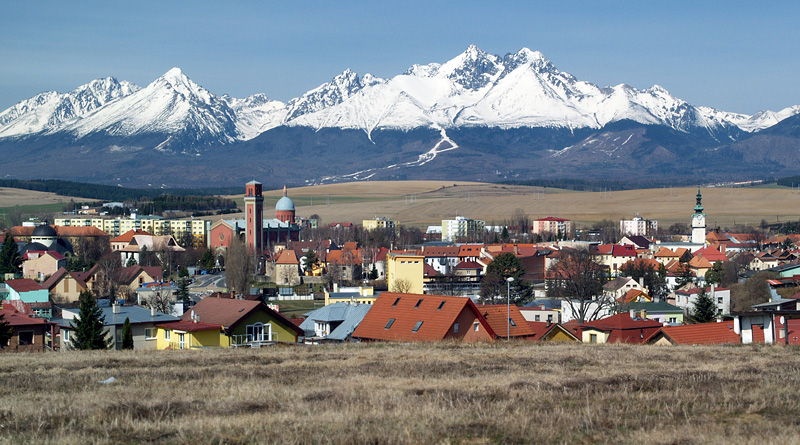
Panoramic view of Kežmarok (German: Käsmark)

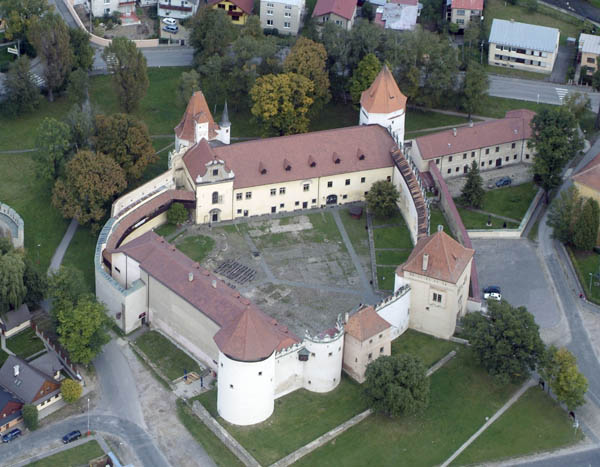
The Kežmarok Castle in Kežmarok

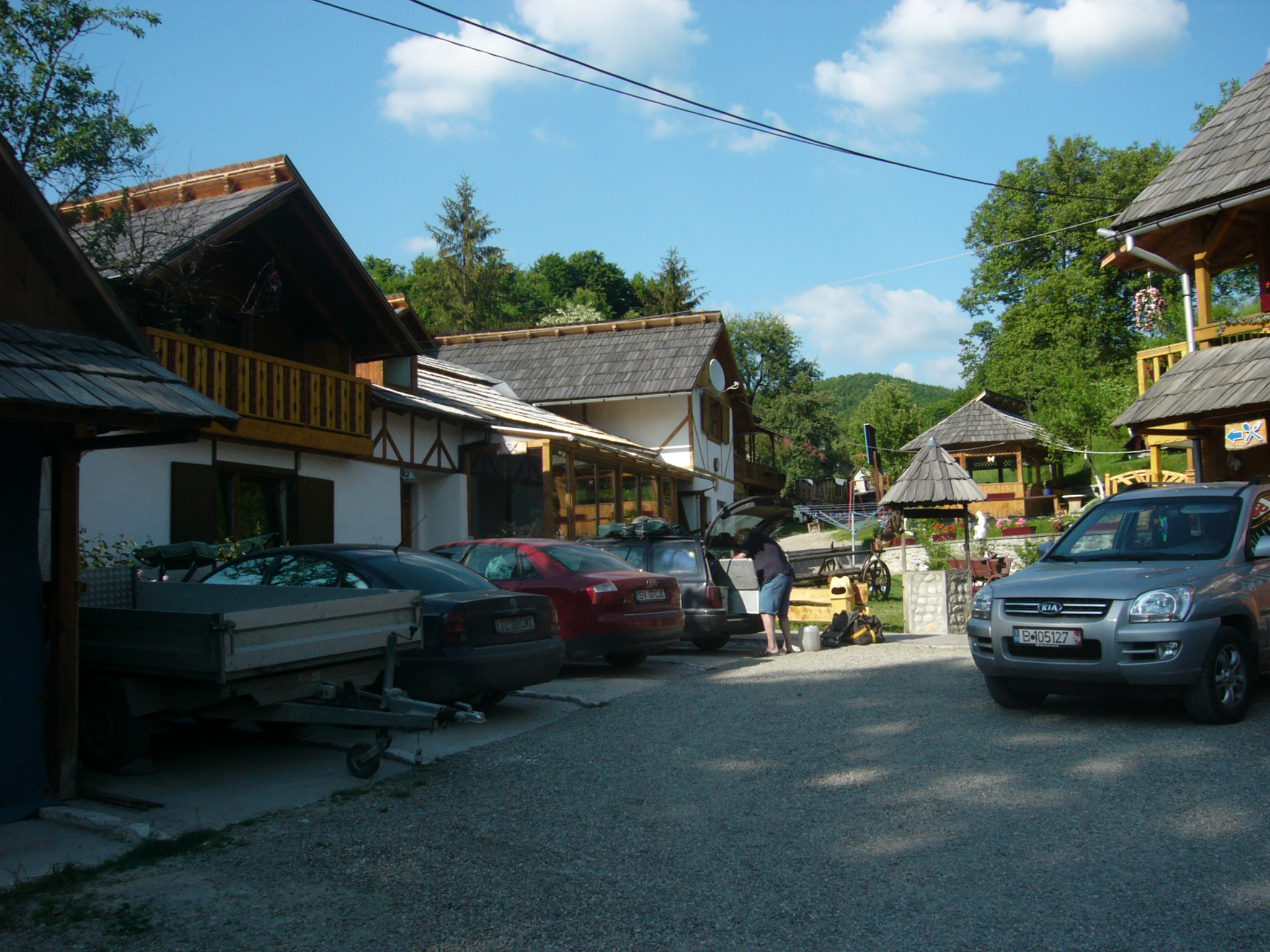
The Țipțerai neighbourhood of Vișeu de Sus (German: Oberwischau), Maramureș, Romania

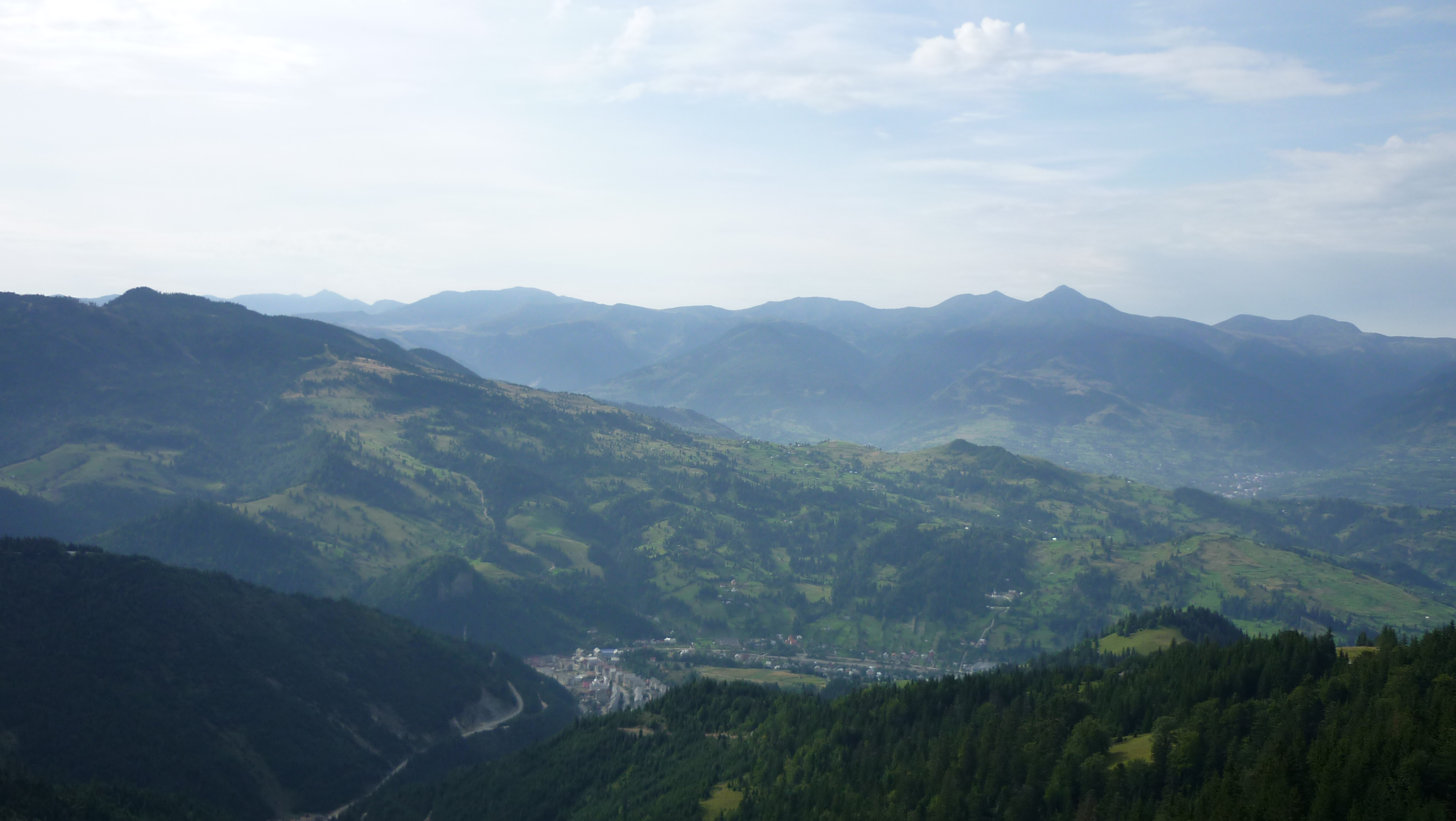
Borșa (German: Borscha), or Baia Borșa as it is also known in Romanian, a small town in Maramureș which was home to a Zipser German community in the past as well

== 20th century and contemporary history ==
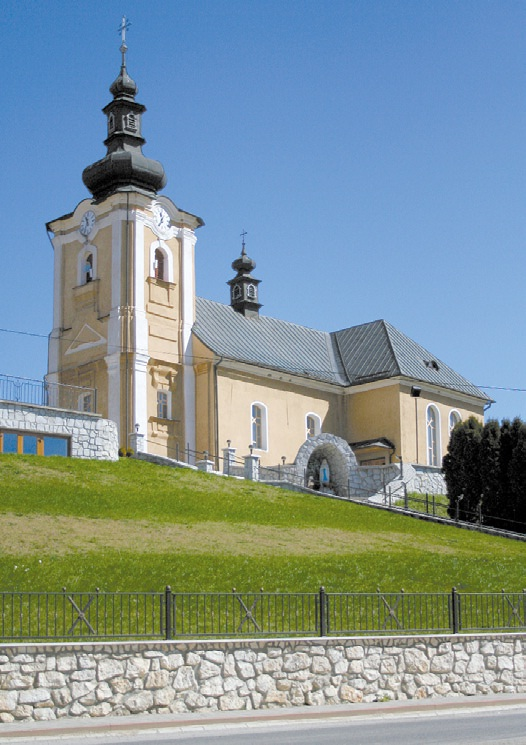
The Roman Catholic church in Chmeľnica (German: Hopgarten

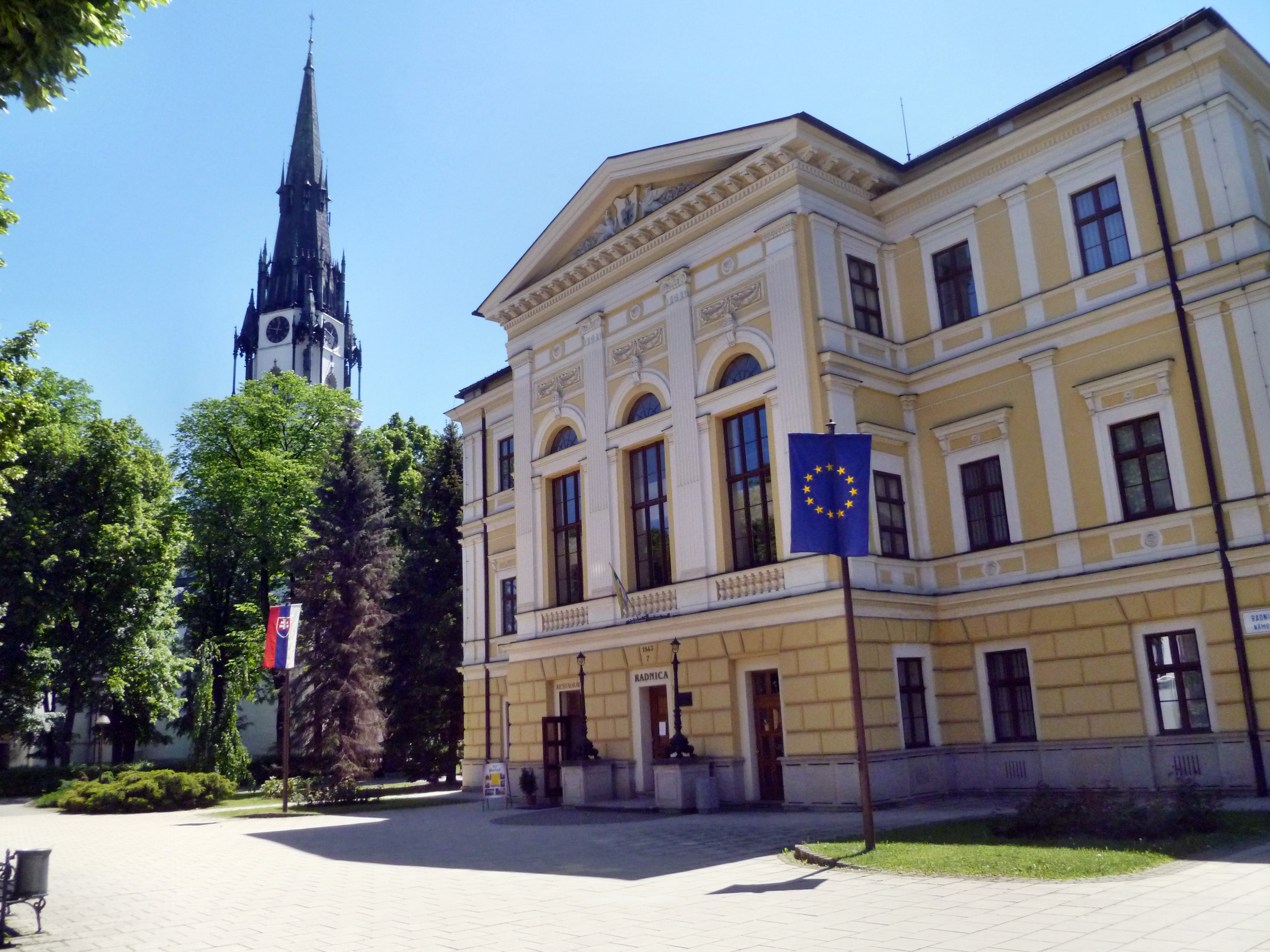
Spišská Nová Ves (German: Zipser Neuendorf) in the Košice Region, a town which was previously inhabited by a sizable Zipser German population during the 19th and early 20th centuries.

During and after World War II, most Zipsers evacuated or were expelled to West Germany. A community of speakers remains in the Zips village of Chmeľnica (German: Hopgarten; their distinctive dialect is called 'Outzäpsersch', German: Altzipserisch, literally Old Zipserish), in the Prešov Region of northern Slovakia. Others remain in Romania where they and other German-speaking minority groups are currently represented by the Democratic Forum of Germans in Romania (FDGR/DFDR) at political, cultural, and administrative levels.

Some notable localities in southern Bukovina (contemporary Suceava County) previously inhabited by a significant number of Zipser Germans include Iacobeni (German: Jakobeny), Cârlibaba (German: Mariensee/Ludwigsdorf), and Fundu Moldovei (German: Luisenthal or Louisenthal).

To this day, sparse Zipser German communities still reside in southern Bukovina and northern Transylvania, in Maramureș/Maramureș County more specifically, where they are also officially represented at political and administrative level (albeit only to a lesser extent) after the latest Romanian locations which were held in September 2020.

Total seats of the FDGR/DFDR in Vișeu de Sus (German: Oberwischau), Maramureș (German: Maramorosch)	As per the results of the 2020 Romanian local elections	1 / 18

Nonetheless, most of the remaining Zipser Germans in Romania live in Maramureș, northern Transylvania. Therefore, the main localities still populated by Zipser Germans in Maramureș County according to the 2011 Romanian census are the following ones, both urban settlements (a town and a municipality):

- Vișeu de Sus (German: Oberwischau)
- Baia Mare (German: Frauendorf or Groß-Neustadt)

== Historical occupations ==
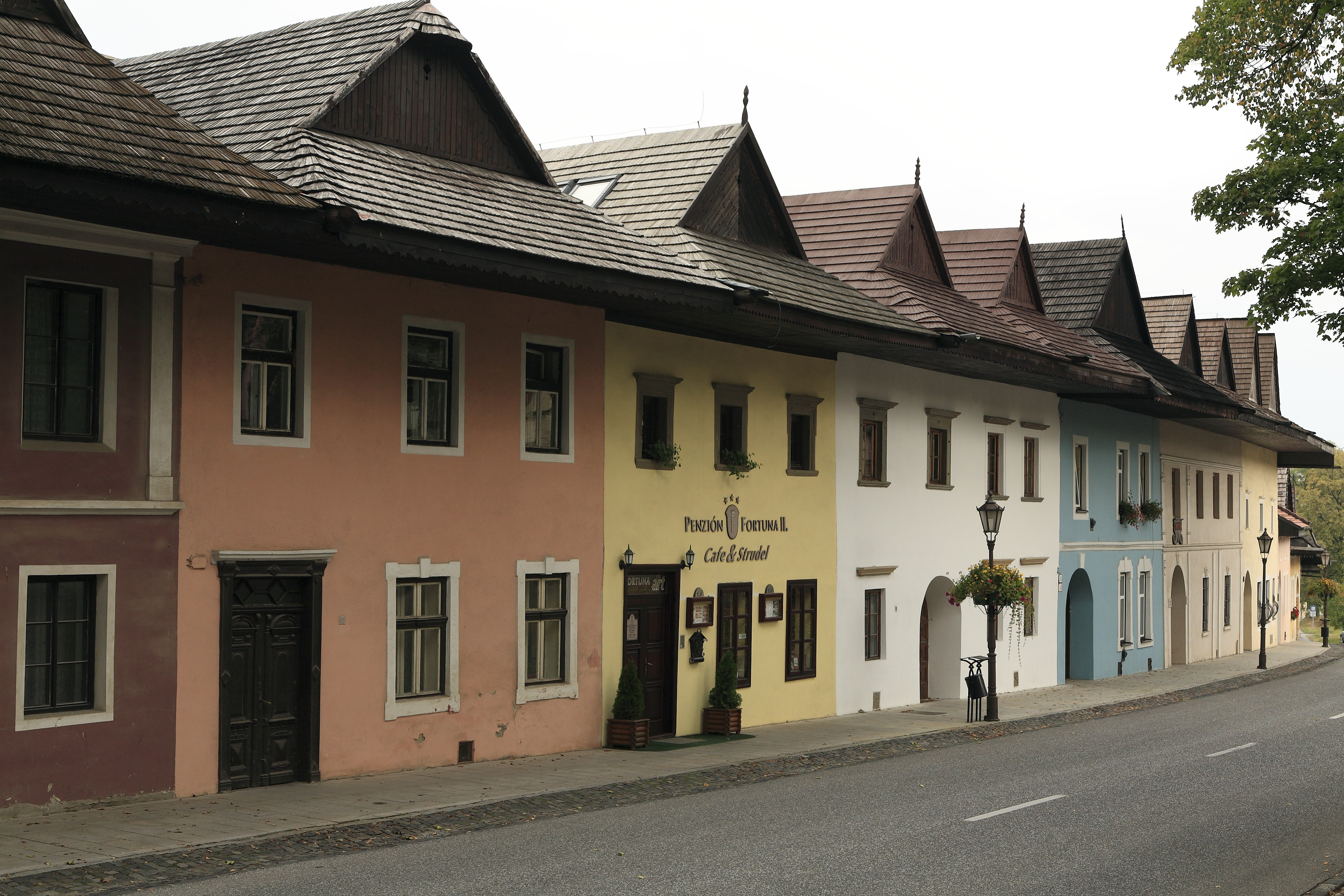
Traditional Zipser German houses situated in Spišská Sobota (German: Georgenberg).

In general, all the more with respect to Maramureș and Bucovina, the Zipser Germans were mainly:

- Miners;
- Lumberjacks;
- Farmers.

Thus, from a historical point of view, their societies are mostly characterised by the rural character of their traditional occupations over the passage of time.

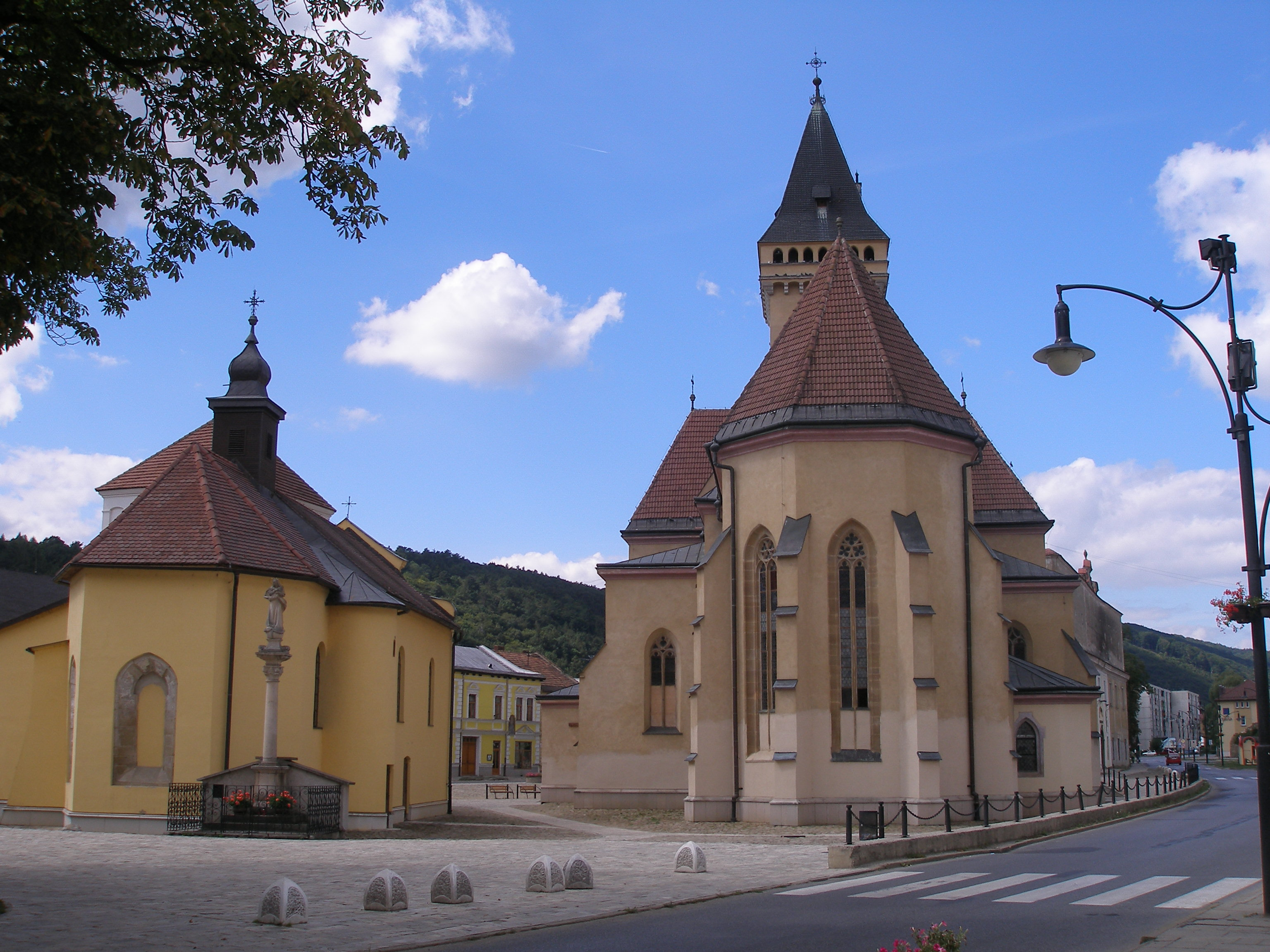
Sabinov (German: Zeben), initially a Slovak village which was subsequently developed by the Zipser Germans in the Prešov Region, Slovakia, since their arrival there in the 13th century.

In medieval times, the historical occupations of the Zipser Germans in Slovakia were the following ones (as it was the case of other German-speaking groups during the Ostsiedlung as part of an emerging feudal system):

- Castle builders or fortification builders in general;
- Knights/soldiers;
- Blacksmiths;
- Carpenters;
- Cobblers (hence e.g. the family name Schuster);
- Miners;
- Lumberjacks;
- Farmers.

The historical occupations of the Zipser Saxons were very similar or identical to those of the Transylvanian Saxons, their kinsmen from Transylvania. As opposed to the Modern Age societies of Zipser Germans in present-day Romania, the societies of Zipser German in medieval contemporary Slovakia had both a rural and urban character, also revitalising urbanisation on previously existing Slavic/Slovak towns and cities.

== Demographics ==
Historical population
Year	Pop.	±%
1930	148,000	—
1946	24,000	−83.8%
1947	20,000	−16.7%
Population statistics referring to Czechoslovakia and Slovakia only. Source:

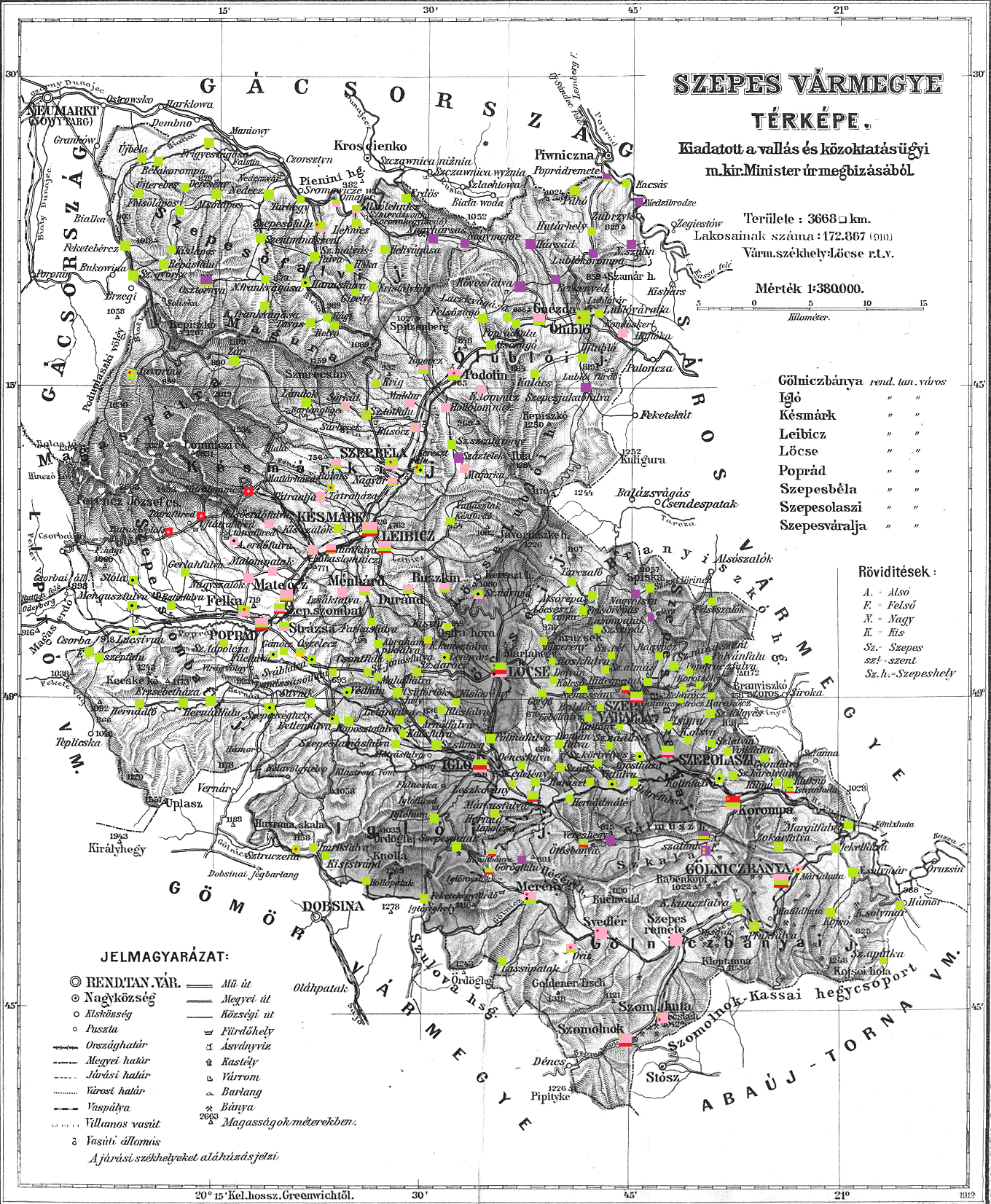
The distribution of Zipser Germans in the former Szepes County (German: Zips) according to the 1910 Austro-Hungarian census.

Once, the Zipser Germans had a significant and sizeable demographic presence in Czechoslovakia and subsequently also in Slovakia, but their numbers have been constantly decreasing over the years well into the 21st century. Nowadays, relatively few live in Slovakia and even fewer Zipsers live in Romania as well. The main reason why their numbers decreased considerably after World War II is because they had been expelled, as was the case of the Sudeten Germans or other German groups from Central and Eastern Europe (German: Ostmitteleuropa), thereby resettling in either Austria or West Germany.

== Media ==
In Slovakia, the Zipser Germans and the Carpathian Germans have their own monthly publication/newspaper which is called Karpatenblatt (the publication also has a YouTube channel).

== Cultural and social life in Romania ==
In Romania, the Zipser Germans hold a festival on yearly basis (just as other German-speaking and German-stemming ethnic minorities all across Romania) which is called Zipsertreff. The Zipsertreff is held in Vișeu de Sus (German: Oberwischau) in Maramureș and is an important celebration of the local Zipser German heritage and culture.

== Zipser Germans ==
- Christian Andreas Zipser (1783–1864), Hungarian geologist
- Rudolf Schuster, partly Zipser German, former President of Slovakia
- Ottó Herman, polymath
- Gerhard Cerny, writer
- Johann Generisch, historian
- Hugo Weczerka, historian

== Gallery ==
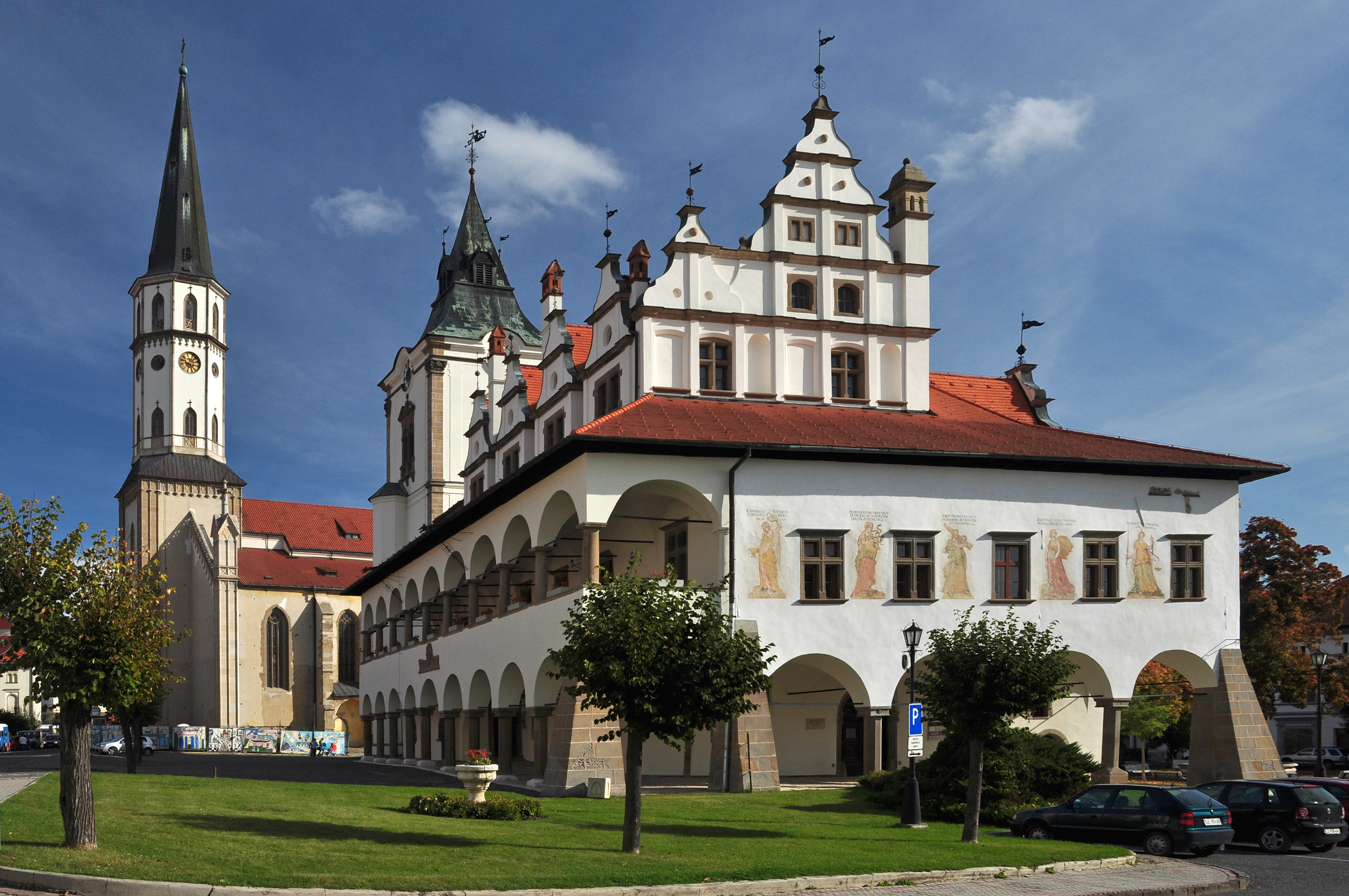
Levoča
(German: Leutschau)

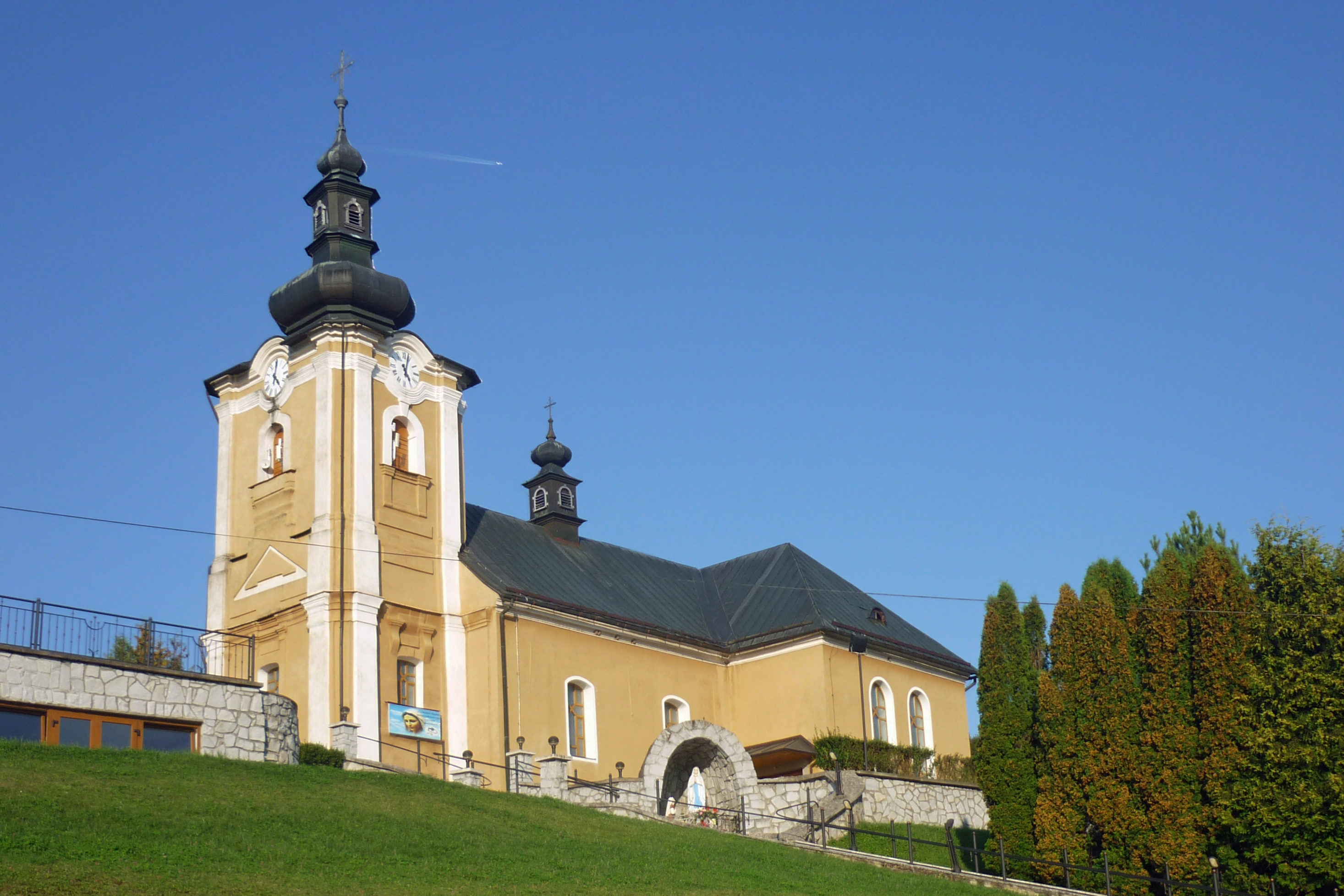
Chmeľnica
(German: Hopgarten)

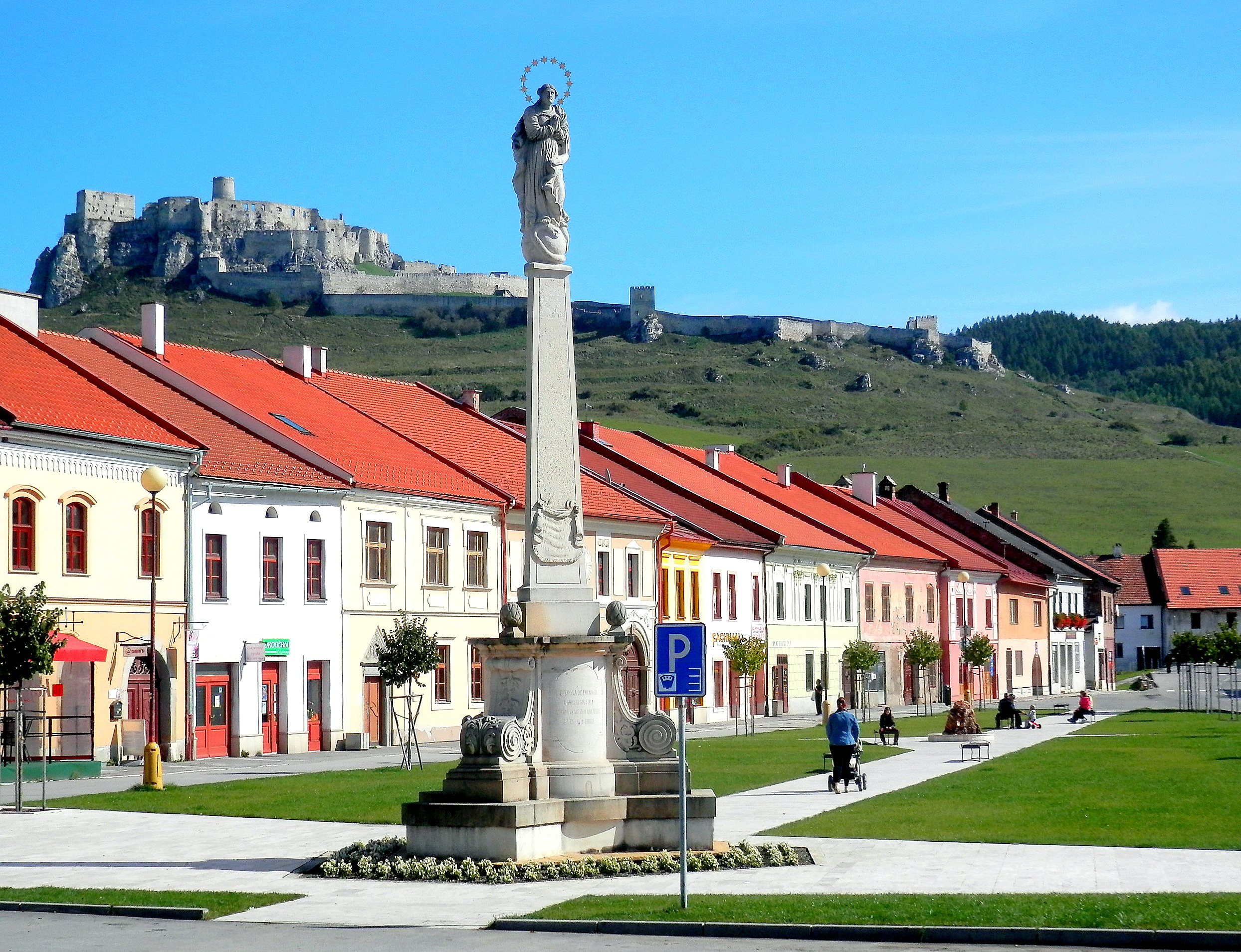
Spišské Podhradie (German: Kirchdrauf)

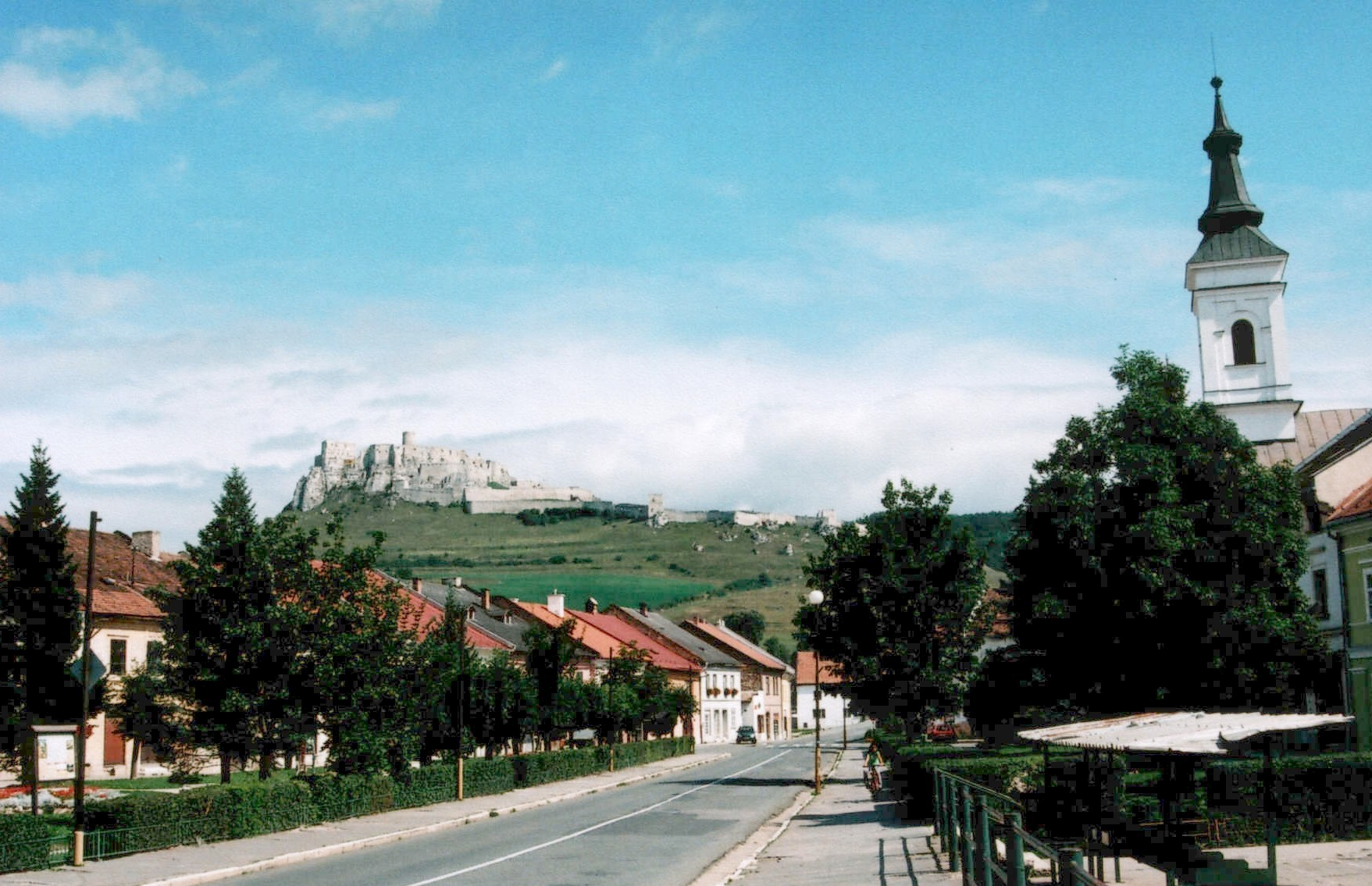
Spišské Podhradie (German: Kirchdrauf)

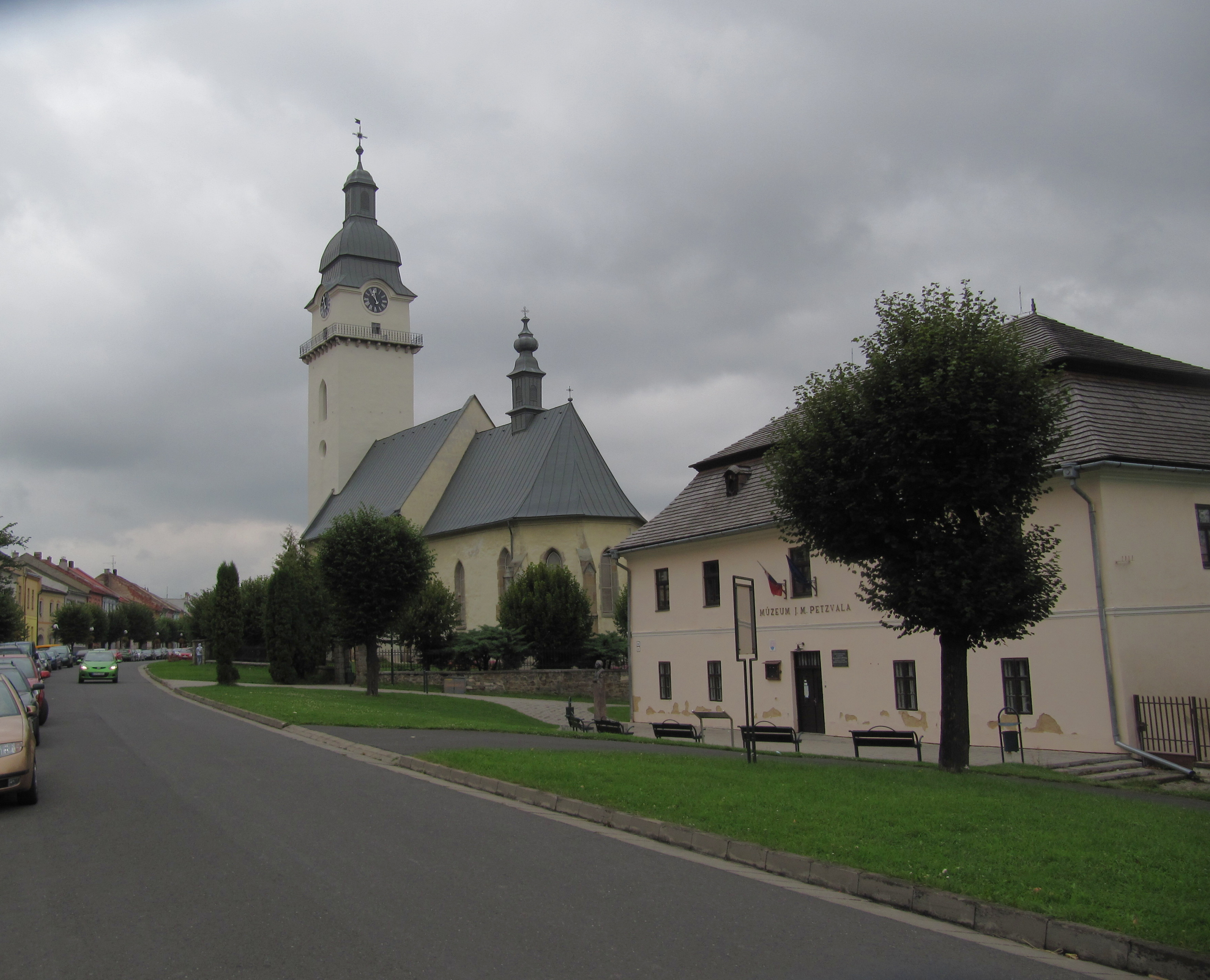
Spišská Belá (German: Zipser Bela)

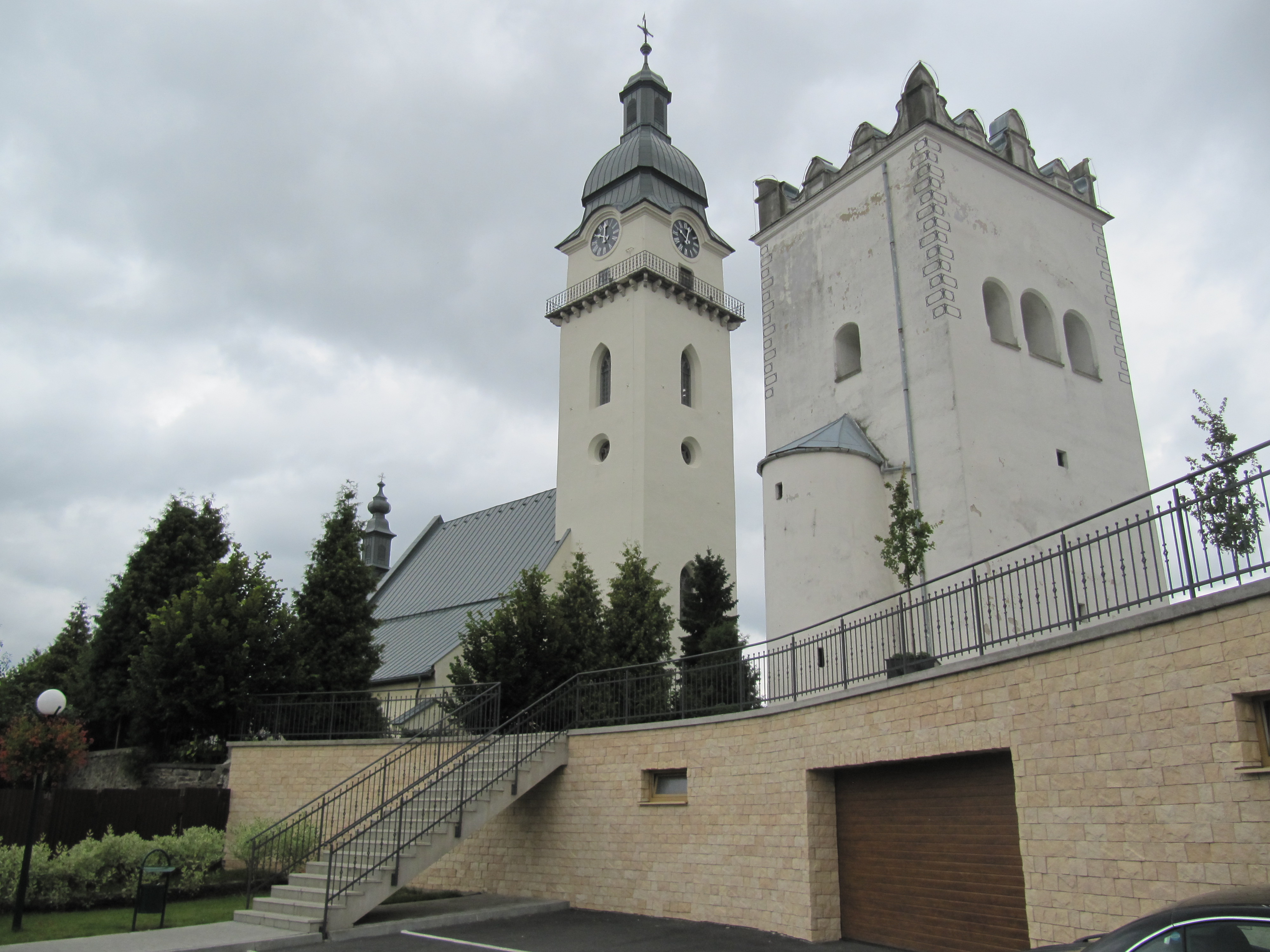
Spišská Belá (German: Zipser Bela)

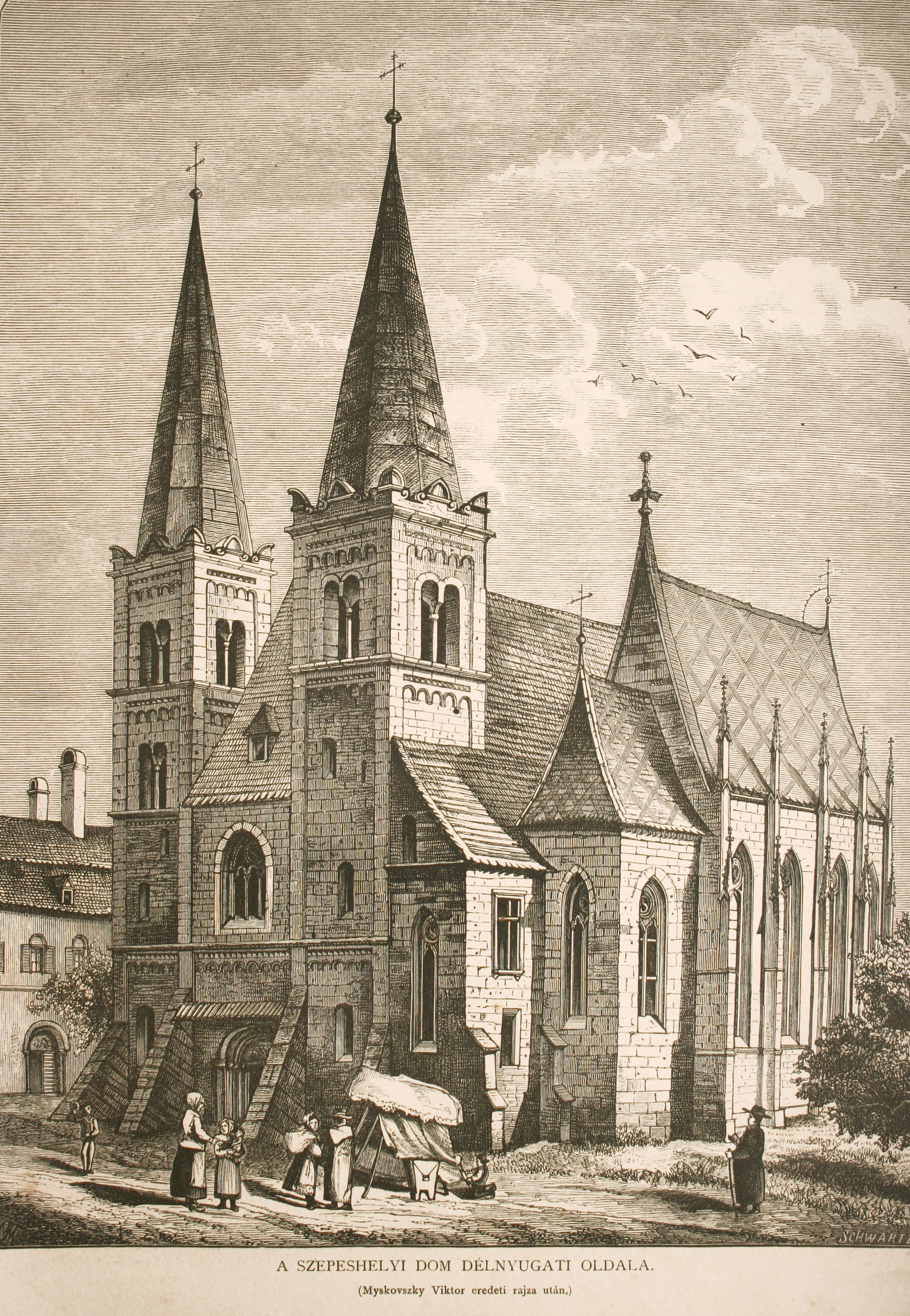
Saint Martin Roman Catholic Cathedral in Spišské Podhradie (German: Kirchdrauf) in 1880

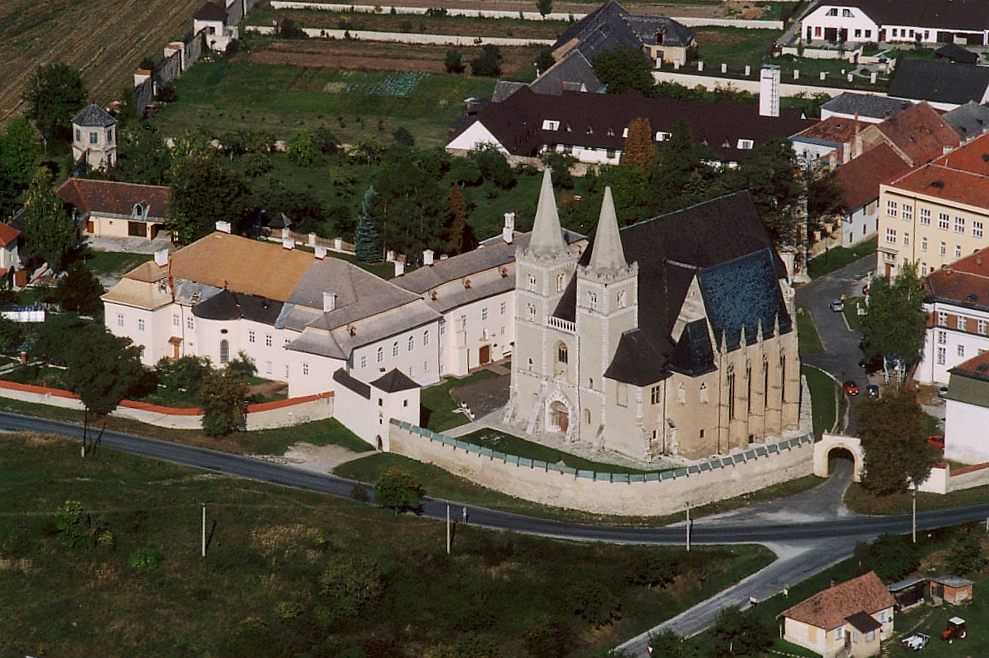
Spišské Podhradie (German: Kirchdrauf)

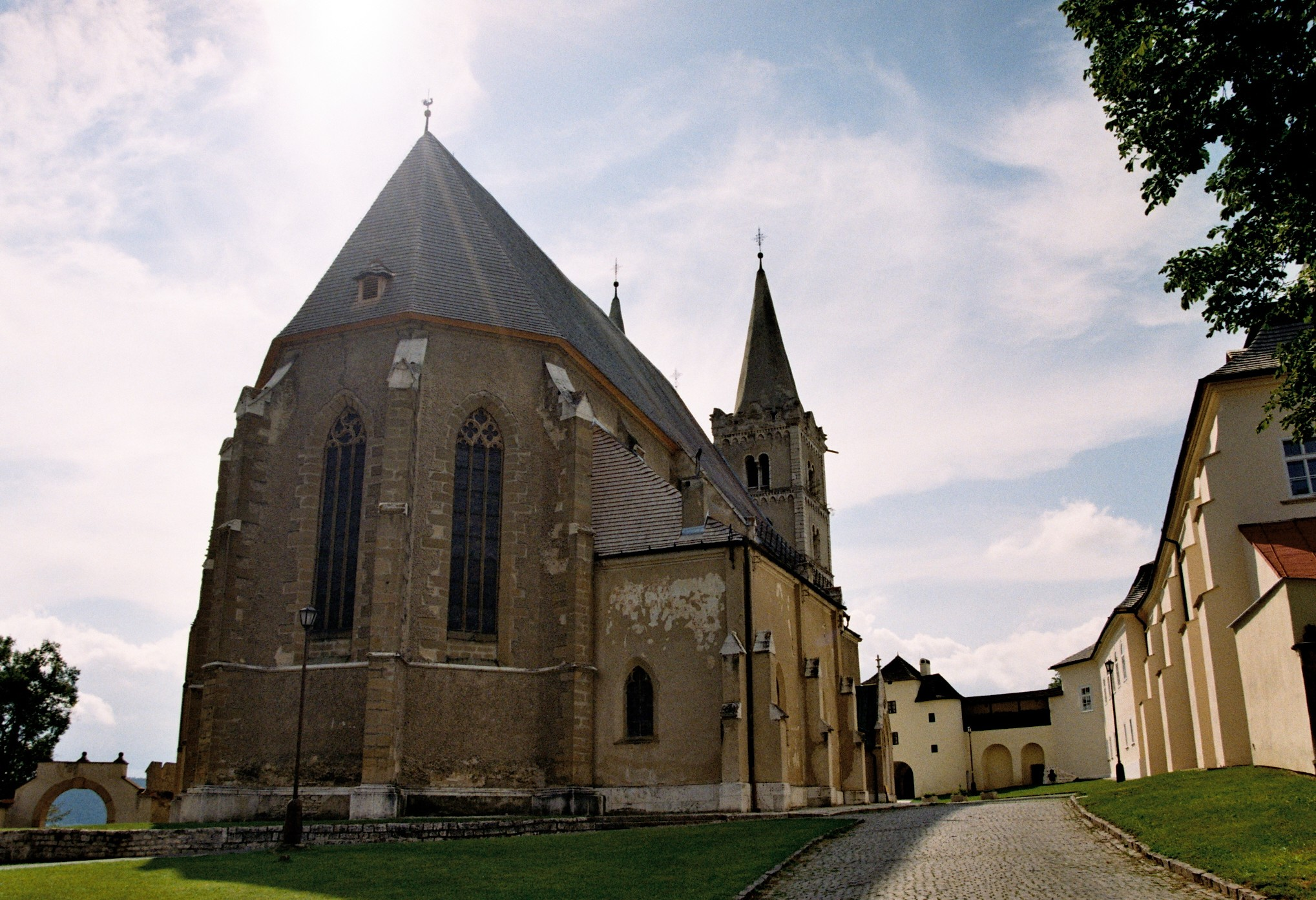
The Roman Catholic cathedral at Spišské Podhradie
(German: Kirchdrauf)

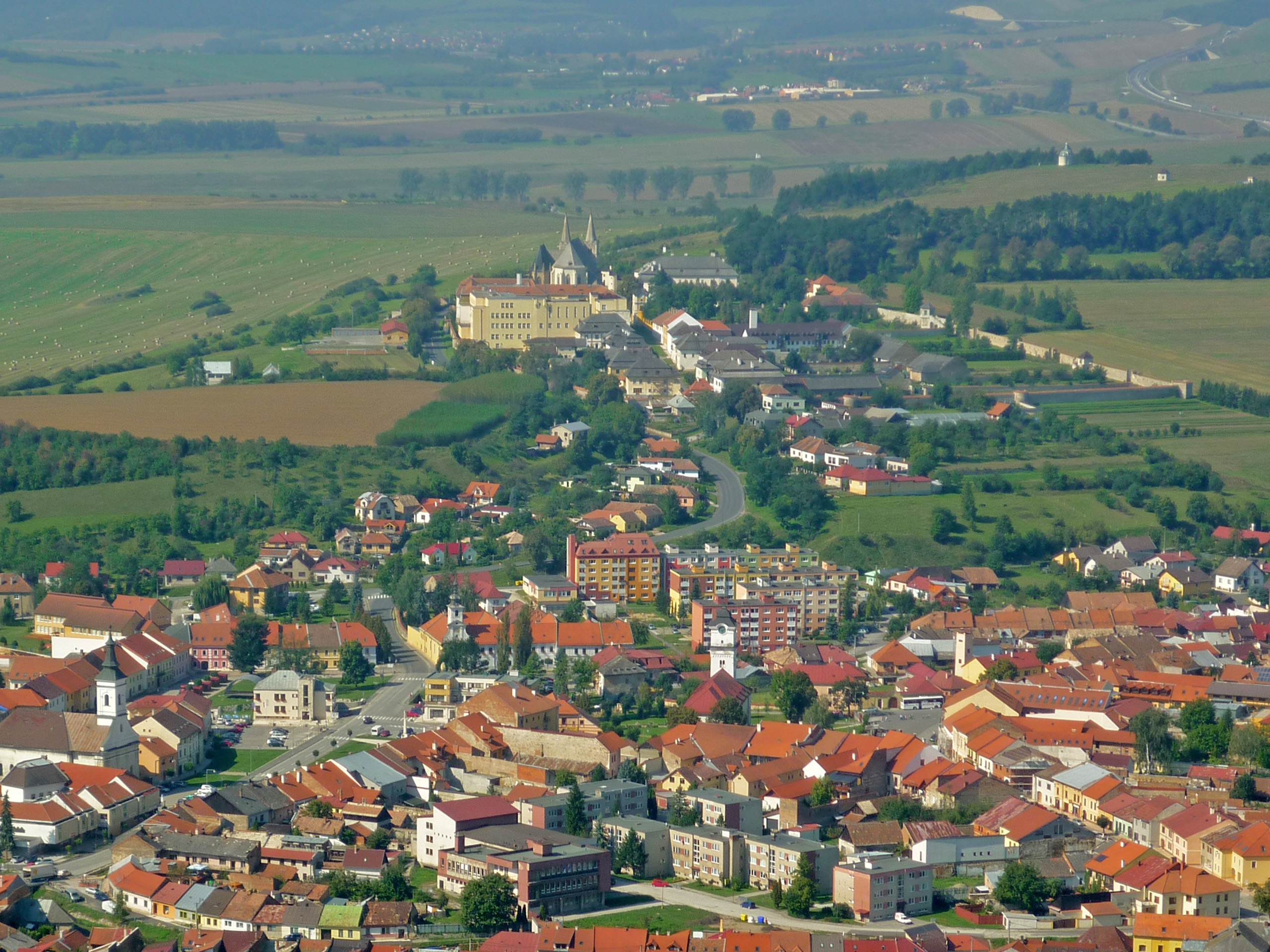
Overview of Spišský hrad (German: Zipser Burg): Spišské Podhradie (German: Kirchdrauf) and Spišská Kapitula (German: Zipser Kapitel)

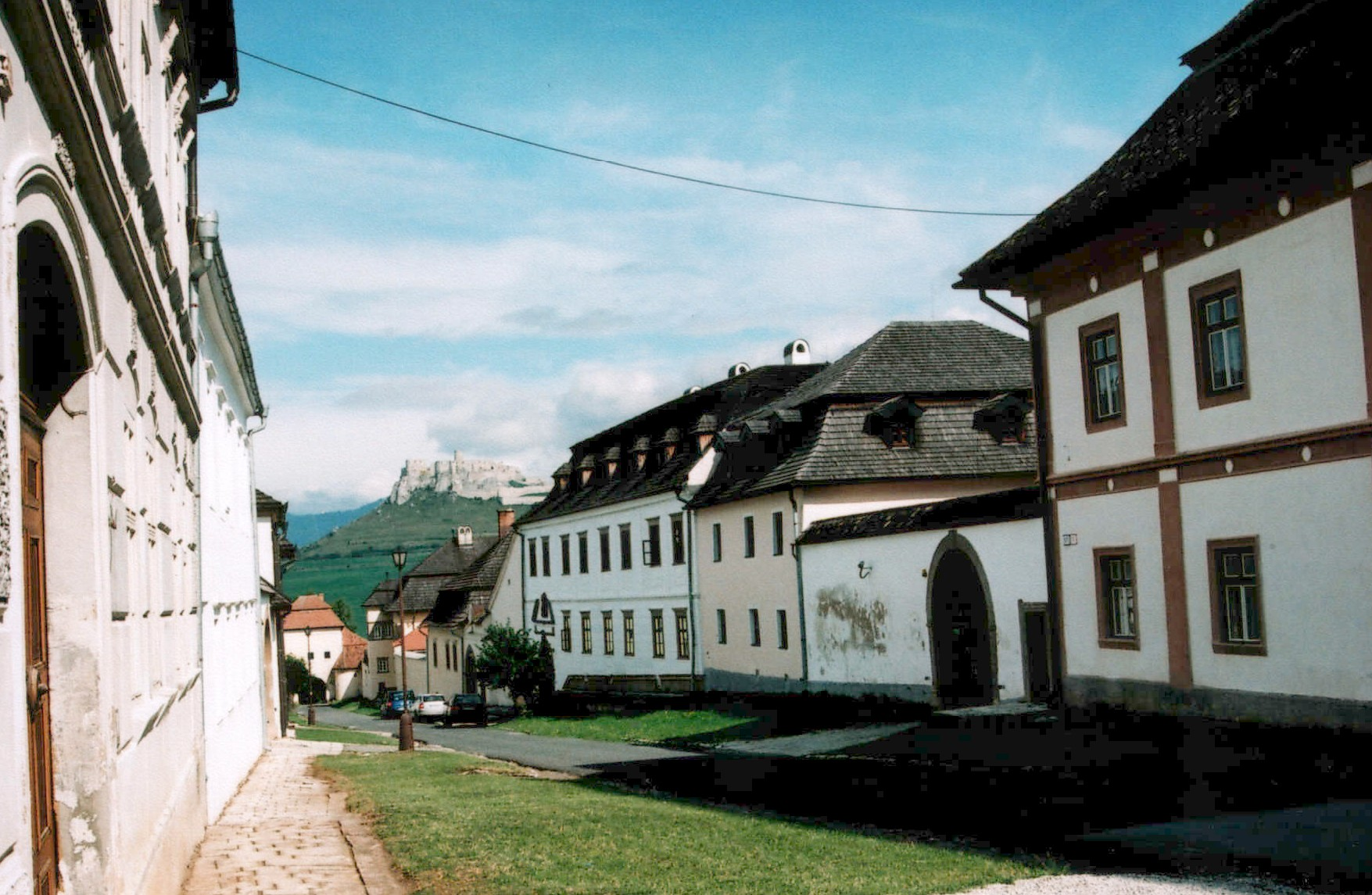
Spišská Kapitula (German: Zipser Kapitel)

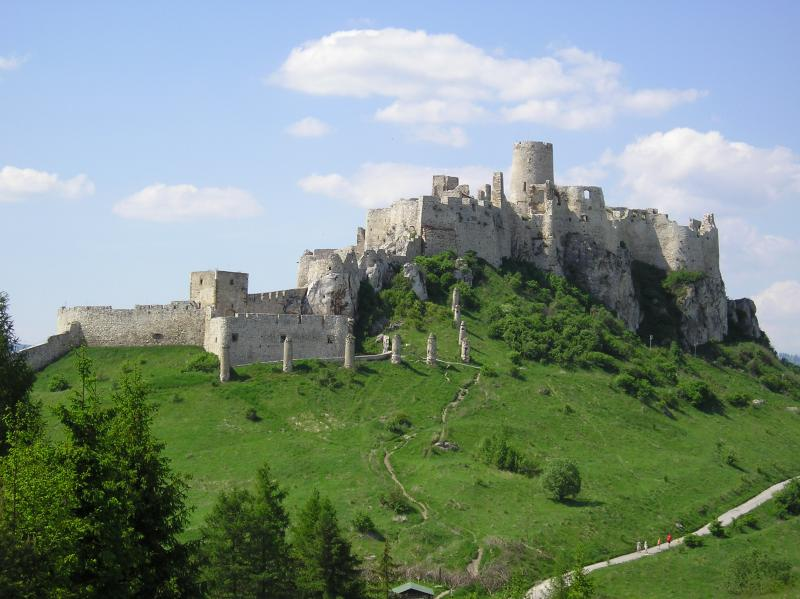
Spiš Castle
(German: Zipser Burg)

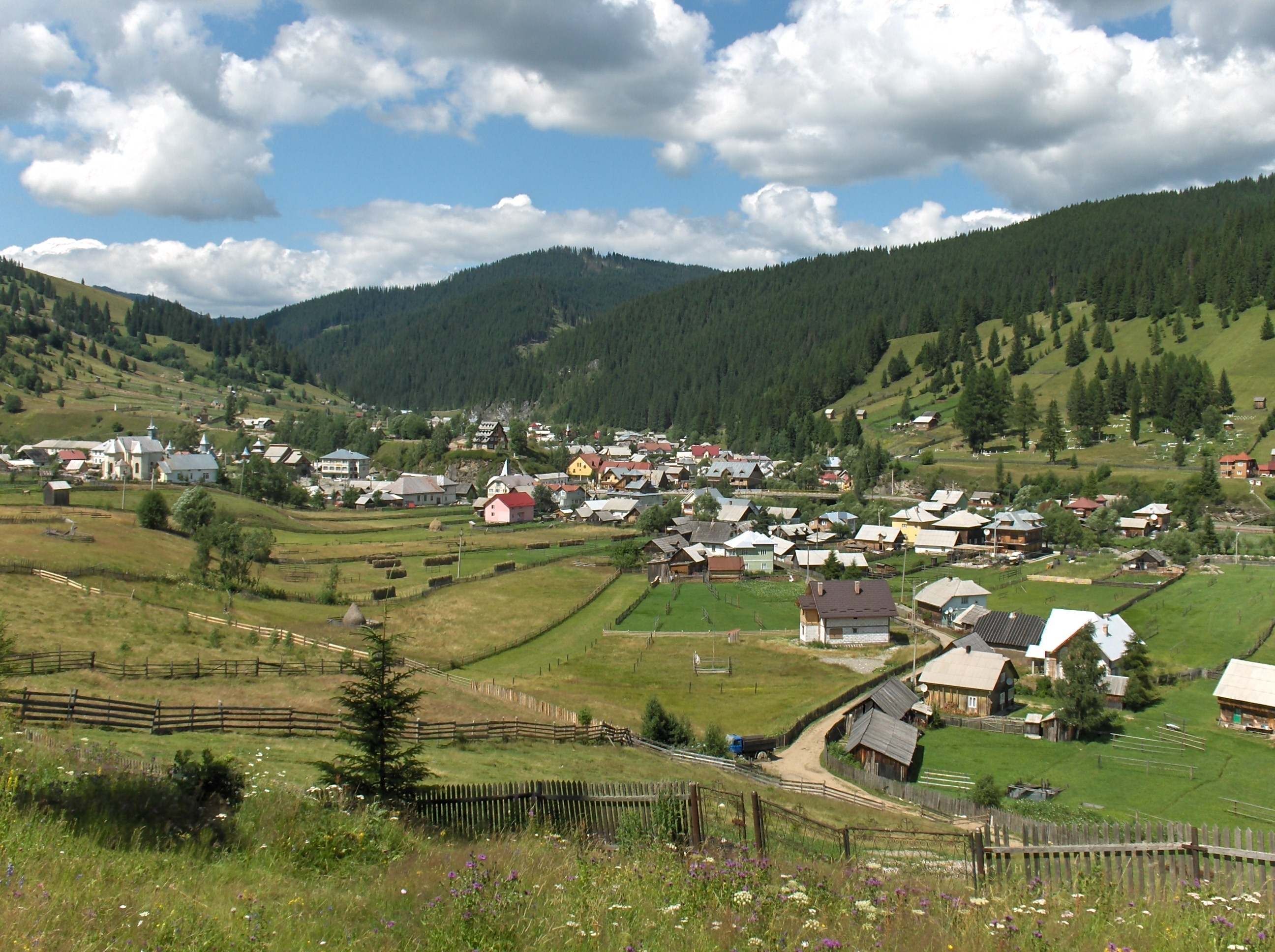
Cârlibaba
(German: Mariensee or Ludwigsdorf) in Suceava County, northeastern Romania

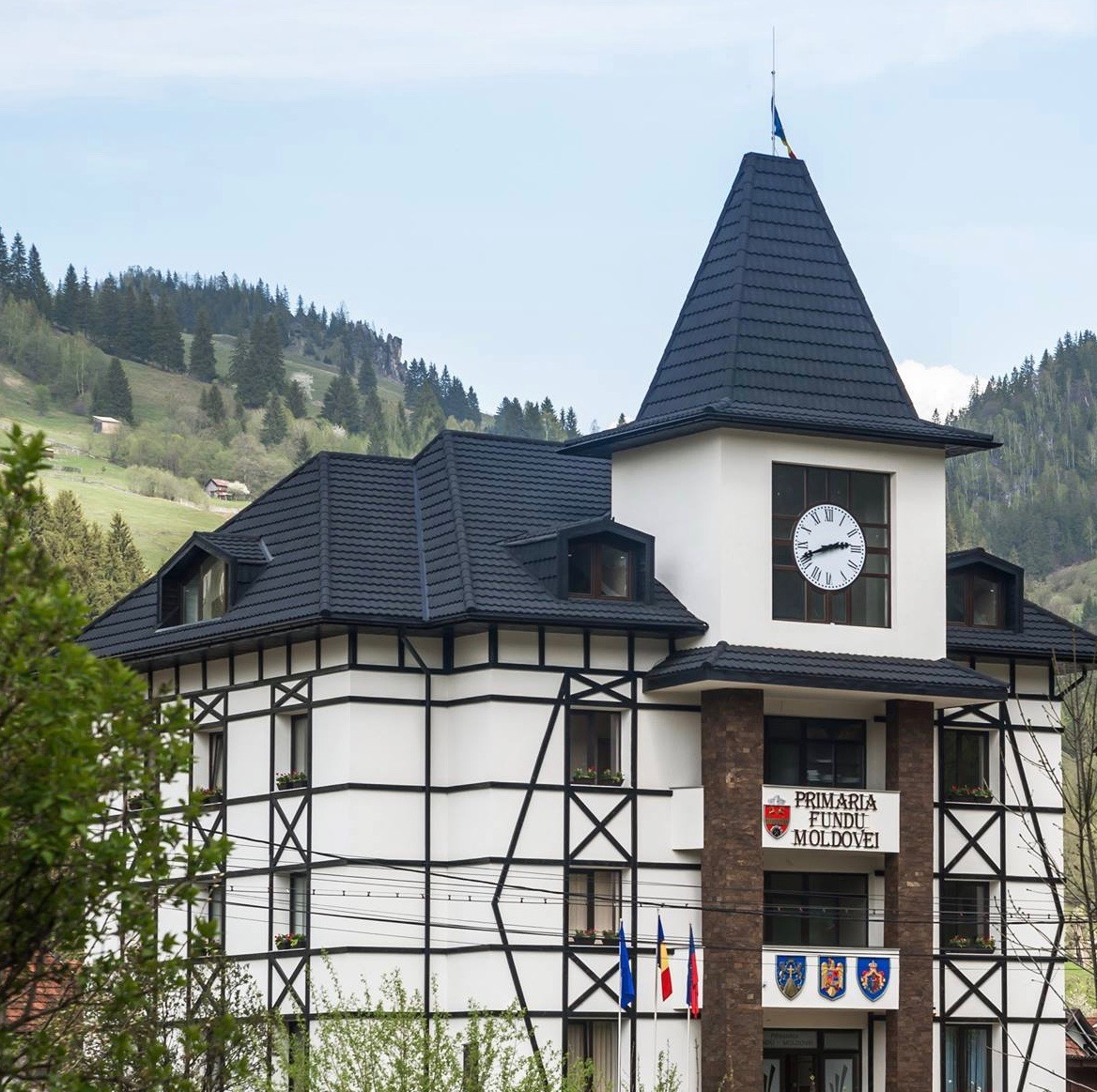
Fundu Moldovei (German: Luisenthal or Louisenthal) in Suceava County, northeastern Romania

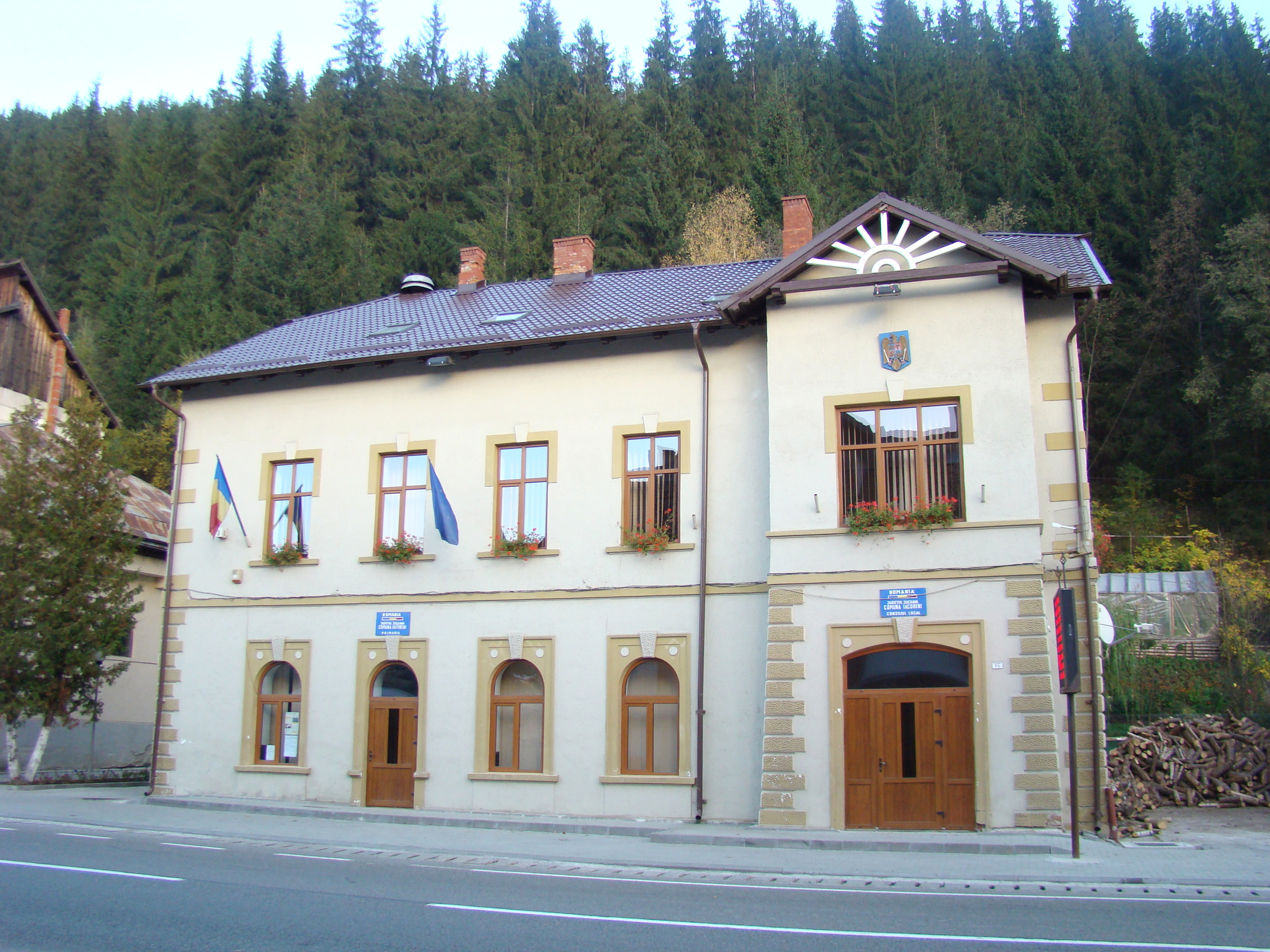
Iacobeni (German: Jakobeny) in Suceava County, northeastern Romania

== See also ==
- List of German names for places in Slovakia
- Province of 16 Szepes Towns
- Roman Catholic Diocese of Satu Mare
- Veľká Lomnica
- Dobšiná
- Prešov
- German Party (Slovakia)
- Zipser German Party
- Carpathian German Party
- Carpathian Germans
- Bukovina Germans
- German minority in Poland
- Transylvanian Saxons
- Germans of Romania
