= Fundu Moldovei =

Fundu Moldovei German: Luisenthal
- Commune
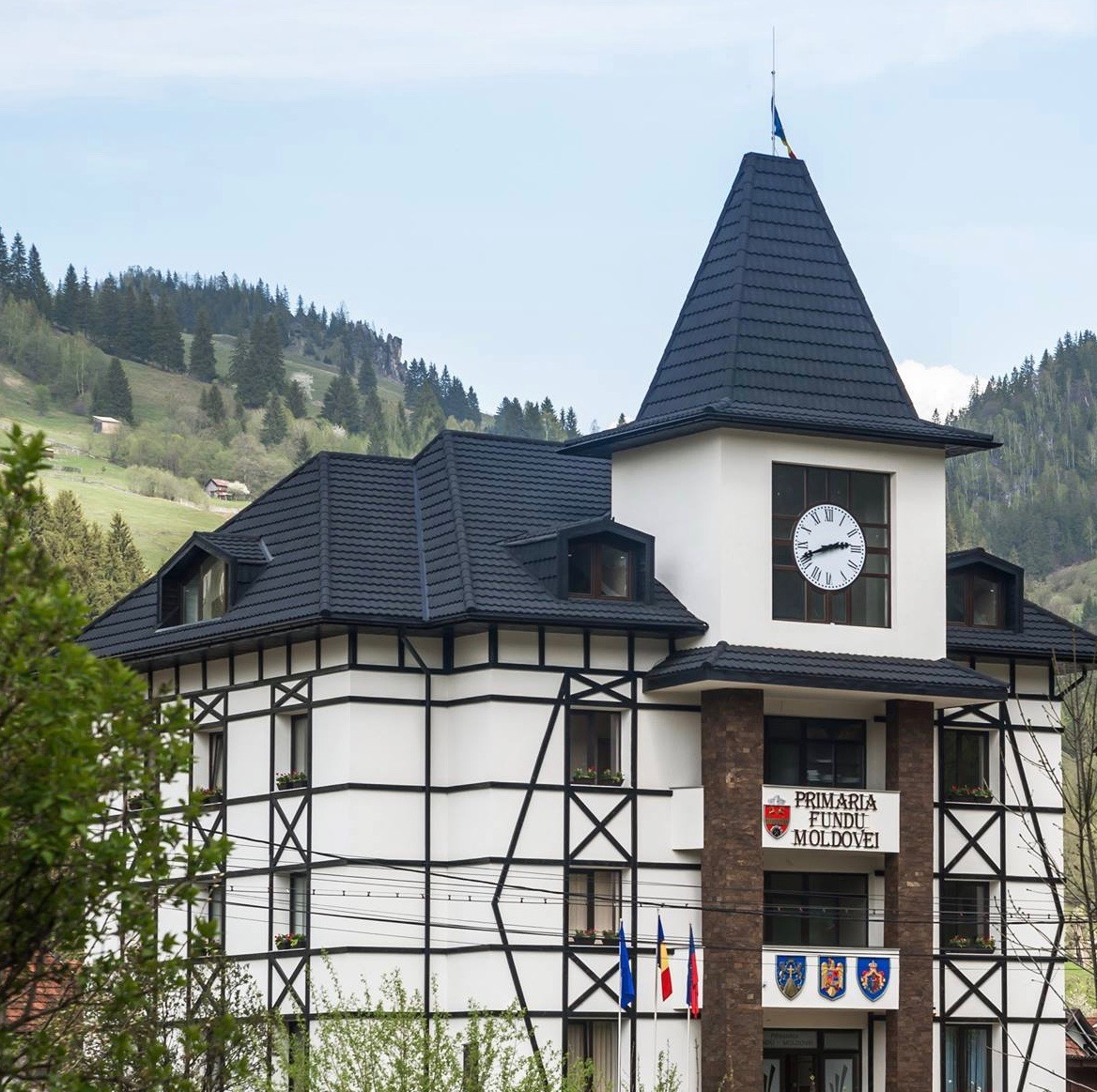
- Fundu Moldovei town hall (in mid November 2017)

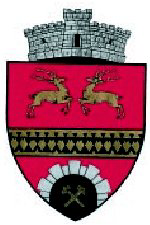
- Coat of arms

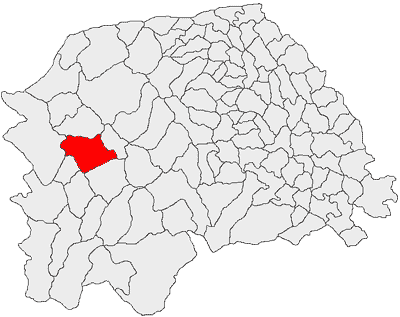
- Location in Suceava County

- Location in Romania
- Coordinates: 47°32′N 25°24′E
- Country: Romania
- County: Suceava
- Subdivisions: Fundu Moldovei, Botuș, Botușel, Braniștea, Colacu, Delnița, Deluț, Obcina Ursului, Plai, Smida Ungurenilor

Government
  - Mayor (2024–2028): Tudor-Ion Zdrob (PNL)
- Area: 175.79 km^{2} (67.87 sq mi)
- Elevation: 726 m (2,382 ft)
- Population (2021-12-01): 3,720
  - Density: 21.2/km^{2} (54.8/sq mi)
- Time zone: UTC+02:00 (EET)
  - Summer (DST): UTC+03:00 (EEST)
- Postal code: 727265
- Area code: (+40) x30
- Vehicle reg.: SV
- Website: fundumoldovei.ro

Fundu Moldovei (German: Luisenthal/Louisenthal or Fundul Moldawi/Fundu-Moldowi/Fundul-Moldovan) is a commune located in Suceava County, Bukovina, northeastern Romania. It is composed of ten villages, namely: Botuș, Botușel, Braniștea, Colacu, Delnița, Deluț, Fundu Moldovei, Obcina Ursului, Plai, and Smida Ungurenilor.

The commune was previously inhabited by a significant community of Zipser Germans (part of the larger Bukovina German community of Suceava County and Bukovina) during the modern period up until the mid 20th century.

Fundu Moldovei is also part of the Via Transilvanica long-distance trail.

== History ==
Historical affiliations

Moldavia (1388–1775)
Habsburg Monarchy (1775–1804)
Austrian Empire (1804–1867)
Austria-Hungary, Cisleithania (1867–1918)
Kingdom of Romania (1918–1947)
Romanian People's Republic (1947–1965)
Socialist Republic of Romania (1965–1989)
Romania (1989–present)

As it is the case of other former mining rural settlements from Suceava County, Fundu Moldovei (German: Luisenthal) was previously inhabited by a sizeable German community, more specifically by Zipser Germans (part of the larger Bukovina German community) during the modern period up until the mid 20th century, starting as early as the Habsburg period and, later on, the Austro-Hungarian period.

== Politics and local administration ==
=== Communal council ===
The commune's current local council has the following political composition, according to the results of the 2020 Romanian local elections:

Party	Seats	Current Council
National Liberal Party (PNL)	7	
People's Movement Party (PMP)	5	
Social Democratic Party (PSD)	1	
