= Spišská Belá =

- Municipality
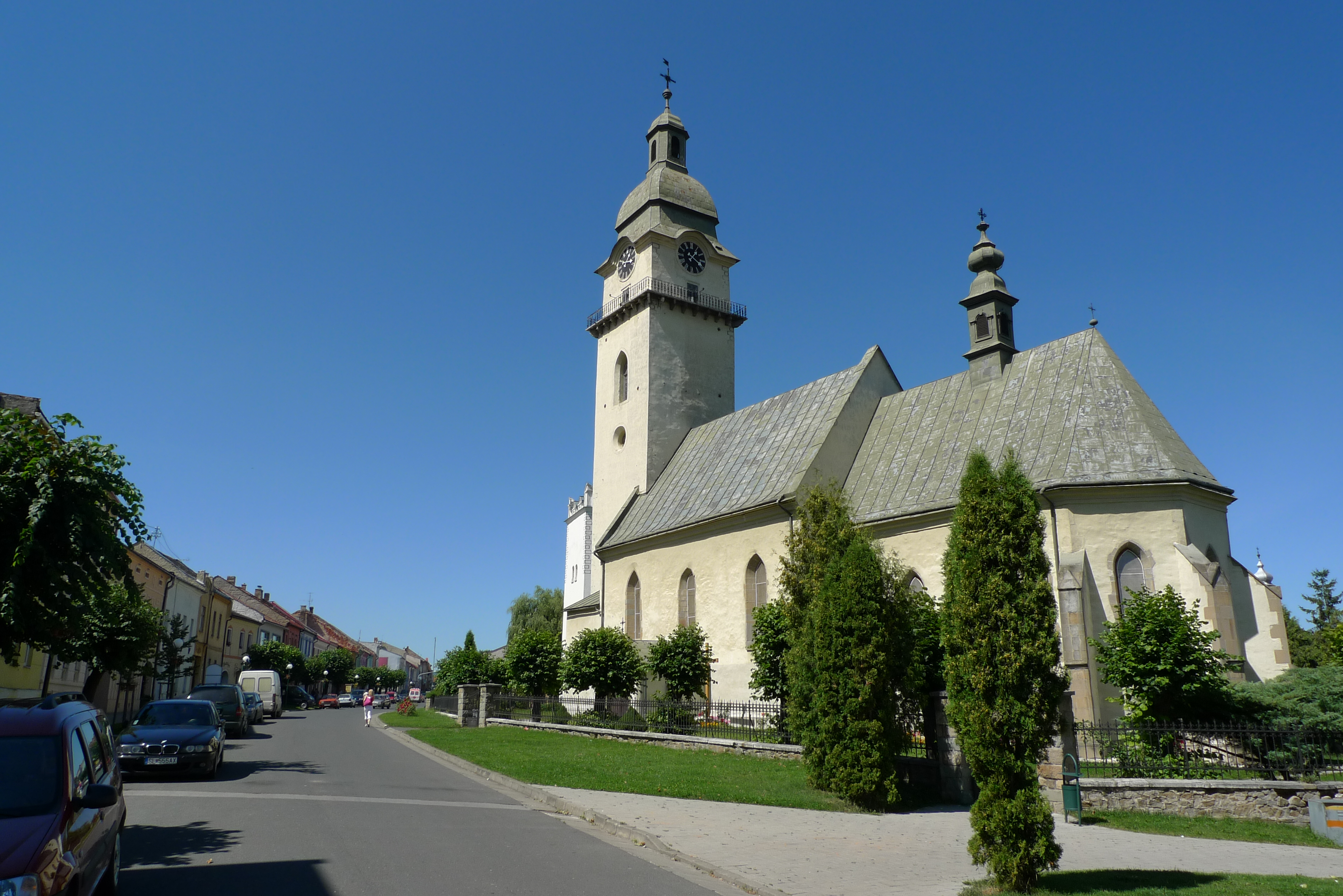
- Church in Spišská Belá

- Flag Coat of arms

- Location of Spišská Belá in the Prešov Region Location of Spišská Belá in Slovakia
- Coordinates: 49.19°N 20.46°E
- Country: Slovakia
- Region: Prešov Region
- District: Kežmarok District
- First mentioned: 1263

Government
  - Mayor: Jozef Kuna

Area
  - Total: 33.93 km^{2} (13.10 sq mi)
- Elevation: 622 m (2,041 ft)

Population (2025)
  - Total: 6,648
- Time zone: UTC+1 (CET)
  - Summer (DST): UTC+2 (CEST)
- Postal code: 590 1
- Area code: +421 52
- Vehicle registration plate (until 2022): KK
- Website: spisskabela.sk

Spišská Belá (German: Zipser Bela; Hungarian: Szepesbéla; Rusyn: Спіська Бела; Polish: Biała Spiska) is a town in the Kežmarok District in the Prešov Region in Spiš in northern Slovakia. Prior to World War I, it was in Szepes county in the Kingdom of Hungary.

== History ==
The town was first mentioned in historical records in 1263. The town received town rights in 1271. Scientist and inventor Joseph Petzval was born here in 1807. The town center has been designated an historic district. The church in the center of the square was built in the 15th century. The tower next to the church was dedicated to when to town received town rights back in 1271.

In 1910 the town had 2,894 inhabitants, half of them were Slovaks and the other half Germans. The town was mainly Catholic but also had a significant Lutheran minority. It was part of the German language island of the Oberzips. Before the establishment of independent Czechoslovakia in 1918, Spišská Belá was part of Szepes County within the Kingdom of Hungary. From 1939 to 1945, it was part of the Slovak Republic. On 27 January 1945, the Red Army dislodged the Wehrmacht from Spišská Belá in the course of the Western Carpathian offensive and it was once again part of Czechoslovakia. After the end of World War II the German population was expelled according to the Beneš decrees.

== Geography ==
The municipality lies at an altitude of 622 metres (2,041 ft) and covers an area of 33.93 km^{2} (13.10 sq mi) (2025).

== Population ==
Historical population
Year	Pop.	±%
1970	4,951	—
1980	5,225	+5.5%
1991	5,408	+3.5%
2001	6,136	+13.5%
2011	6,387	+4.1%
2021	6,646	+4.1%
Source: Censuses

Population statistic (10 years)
Year	1995	2005	2015	2025
Count	5872	6189	6624	6648
Difference		+5.39%	+7.02%	+0.36%

Population statistic
Year	2024	2025
Count	6660	6648
Difference		−0.18%

It has a population of 6648 people (31 December 2025).

=== Ethnicity ===
Census 2021 (1+ %)
Ethnicity	Number	Fraction
Slovak	6020	90.58%
Not found out	597	8.98%
Romani	126	1.89%
Total	6646	

In year 2021 was 6646 people by ethnicity 6020 as Slovak, 597 as Not found out, 126 as Romani, 29 as Czech, 22 as Rusyn, 20 as Polish, 15 as Other, 9 as German, 7 as Hungarian, 6 as Vietnamese, 4 as Ukrainian, 3 as Irish, 3 as Canadian, 2 as Jewish, 2 as Russian, 2 as Romanian, 1 as Moravian and 1 as Iranian.

Note on population: The difference values of population numbers in the table "Population statistic" and in the sections "Ethnicity" & "Religion" is caused by the use of various statistical methods.

=== Religion ===
Census 2021 (1+ %)
Religion	Number	Fraction
Roman Catholic Church	4890	73.58%
None	636	9.57%
Not found out	610	9.18%
Evangelical Church	242	3.64%
Greek Catholic Church	129	1.94%
Total	6646	

In year 2021 was 6646 people by religion 4890 from Roman Catholic Church, 636 from None, 610 from Not found out, 242 from Evangelical Church, 129 from Greek Catholic Church, 48 from Jehovah's Witnesses, 16 from Ad hoc movements, 15 from Other and not ascertained christian church, 14 from Christian Congregations in Slovakia, 10 from Apostolic Church, 7 from Eastern Orthodox Church, 6 from Paganism and natural spirituality, 6 from Other, 4 from Calvinist Church, 3 from Seventh-day Adventist Church, 3 from Buddhism, 2 from Jewish community, 2 from Baptists Church, 1 from Islam, 1 from Hinduism and 1 from Church of the Brethren.

== Famous people ==
- Joseph Petzval, scientist and inventor
- Michal Greisiger, physician and polymath

== Twin towns — sister cities ==
Spišská Belá is twinned with:

- Vysoké Mýto, Czech Republic
- Brück, Germany
- Ożarów, Poland
- Szczawnica, Poland
