= Chmeľnica =

- Municipality
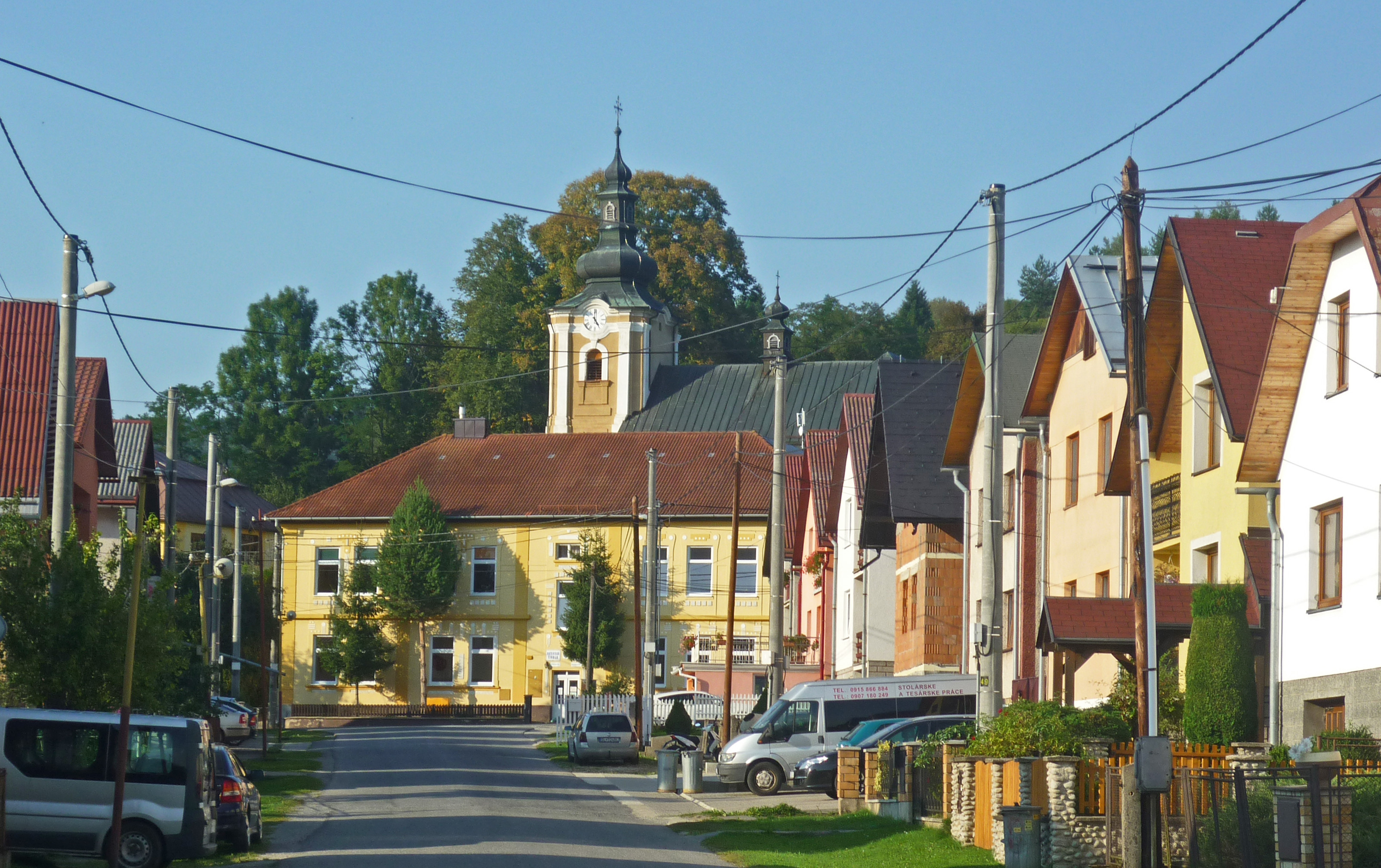

- Flag

- Location of Chmeľnica in the Prešov Region Location of Chmeľnica in Slovakia
- Coordinates: 49.30°N 20.73°E
- Country: Slovakia
- Region: Prešov Region
- District: Stará Ľubovňa District
- First mentioned: 1315

Area
  - Total: 12.64 km^{2} (4.88 sq mi)
- Elevation: 521 m (1,709 ft)

Population (2025)
  - Total: 1,002
- Time zone: UTC+1 (CET)
  - Summer (DST): UTC+2 (CEST)
- Postal code: 640 1
- Area code: +421 52
- Vehicle registration plate (until 2022): SL
- Website: www.chmelnica.sk

Chmeľnica (German: Hopgarten; Hungarian: Komlóskert; Rusyn: Хмельніця; Polish: Chmielnica) is a village and municipality in Stará Ľubovňa District in the Prešov Region of northern Slovakia. The village is traditionally inhabited by Carpathian Germans. It is also famous for music producer SIIK.

== History ==
The village was established in 1315 by German settlers. Another 40 families of ethnic Germans from Silesia arrived here in 1787. Before the establishment of independent Czechoslovakia in 1918, Chmeľnica was part of Szepes County within the Kingdom of Hungary. From 1939 to 1945, it was part of the Slovak Republic. On 24 January 1945, the Red Army dislodged the Wehrmacht from Chmeľnica and it was once again part of Czechoslovakia. The local German-speaking population was not expelled after World War II, but from 1946 until the end of the communist regime, speaking German was outlawed. The survival of German in the village sparked interest in German and Austrian media.

== Geography ==
The municipality lies at an altitude of 521 metres (1,709 ft) and covers an area of 12.64 km^{2} (4.88 sq mi) (2025).

== Population ==
Population statistic (10 years)
Year	1995	2005	2015	2025
Count	902	920	997	1002
Difference		+1.99%	+8.36%	+0.50%

Population statistic
Year	2024	2025
Count	1009	1002
Difference		−0.69%

It has a population of 1002 people (31 December 2025).

=== Ethnicity ===
Census 2021 (1+ %)
Ethnicity	Number	Fraction
Slovak	911	92.95%
German	286	29.18%
Not found out	22	2.24%
Rusyn	19	1.93%
Total	980	

In year 2021 was 980 people by ethnicity 911 as Slovak, 286 as German, 22 as Not found out, 19 as Rusyn, 3 as Czech, 3 as Polish, 1 as Ukrainian, 1 as Romani, 1 as Other and 1 as Croatian.

Note on population: The difference values of population numbers in the table "Population statistic" and in the sections "Ethnicity" & "Religion" is caused by the use of various statistical methods.

=== Religion ===
Census 2021 (1+ %)
Religion	Number	Fraction
Roman Catholic Church	874	89.18%
Greek Catholic Church	49	5%
None	22	2.24%
Not found out	13	1.33%
Total	980	

In year 2021 was 980 people by religion 874 from Roman Catholic Church, 49 from Greek Catholic Church, 22 from None, 13 from Not found out, 9 from Jehovah's Witnesses, 7 from Eastern Orthodox Church, 2 from Evangelical Church, 2 from Ad hoc movements, 1 from Jewish community and 1 from Christian Congregations in Slovakia.

== Genealogical resources ==
The records for genealogical research are available at the state archive "Statny Archiv in Levoca, Slovakia"

- Roman Catholic church records (births/marriages/deaths): 1779-1914 (parish A)

== See also ==
- List of municipalities and towns in Slovakia
