= Kuzmice =

Kuzmice may refer to:

- Kuzmice, Topoľčany District, Slovakia
- Kuzmice, Trebišov District, Slovakia
