= Nemečky =

Nemečky Nemecske
- Municipality
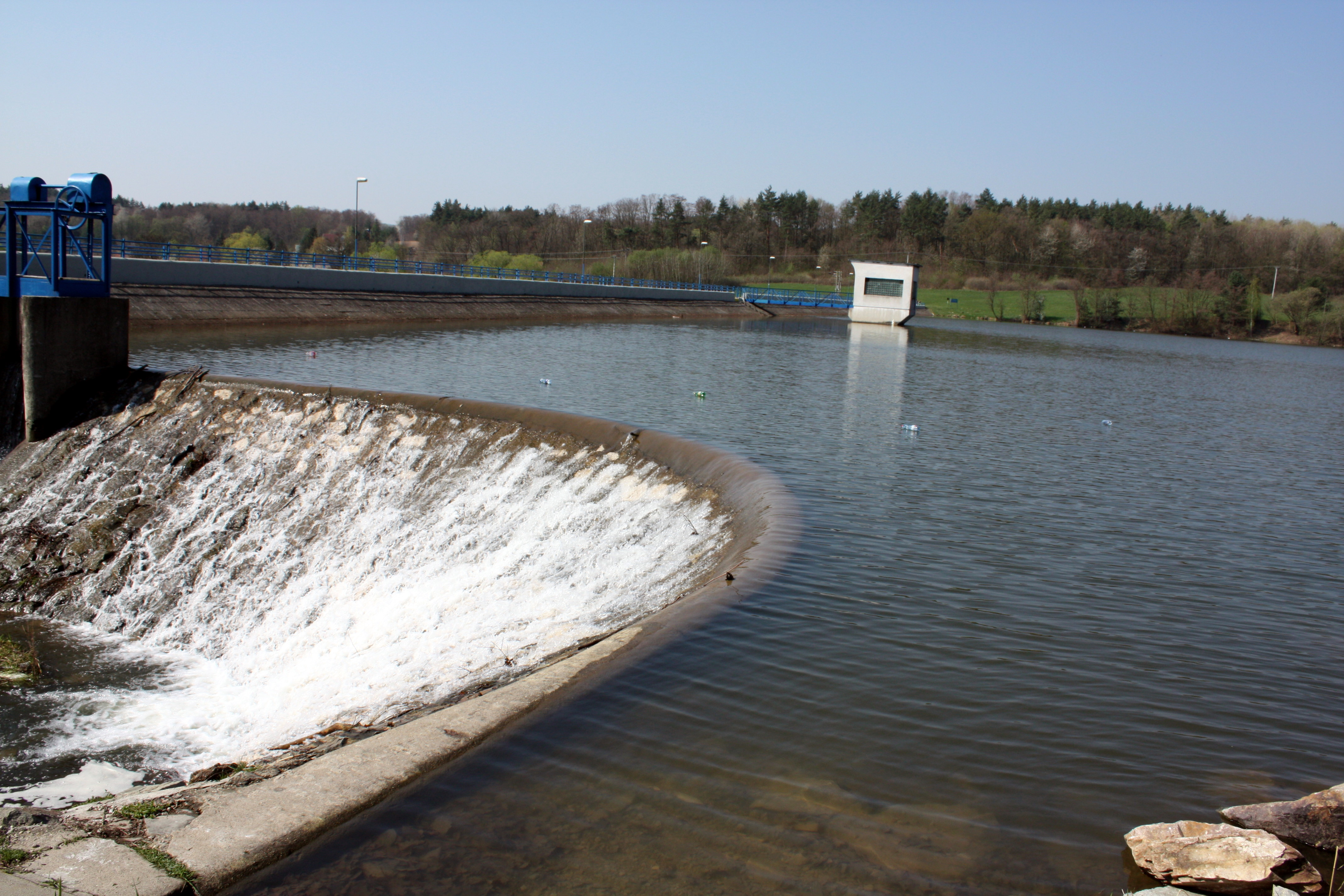
- Nemečky Reservoir

- Flag

- Location of Nemečky in the Nitra Region Location of Nemečky in Slovakia
- Coordinates: 48.67°N 18.12°E
- Country: Slovakia
- Region: Nitra Region
- District: Topoľčany District
- First mentioned: 1359

Area
  - Total: 6.27 km^{2} (2.42 sq mi)
- Elevation: 266 m (873 ft)

Population (2025)
  - Total: 320
- Time zone: UTC+1 (CET)
  - Summer (DST): UTC+2 (CEST)
- Postal code: 956 22
- Area code: +421 38
- Vehicle registration plate (until 2022): TO
- Website: obecnemecky.sk

Nemečky (Hungarian: Nemecske) is a municipality in the Topoľčany District of the Nitra Region, Slovakia. In 2011 it had 309 inhabitants.

== Geography ==
The municipality lies at an altitude of 266 metres (873 ft) and covers an area of 6.27 km^{2} (2.42 sq mi) (2025).

== Population ==
Population statistic (10 years)
Year	1995	2005	2015	2025
Count	282	301	315	320
Difference		+6.73%	+4.65%	+1.58%

Population statistic
Year	2024	2025
Count	316	320
Difference		+1.26%

It has a population of 320 people (31 December 2025).

=== Ethnicity ===
Census 2021 (1+ %)
Ethnicity	Number	Fraction
Slovak	306	99.02%
Other	6	1.94%
Not found out	4	1.29%
Total	309	

In year 2021 was 309 people by ethnicity 306 as Slovak, 6 as Other and 4 as Not found out.

Note on population: The difference values of population numbers in the table "Population statistic" and in the sections "Ethnicity" & "Religion" is caused by the use of various statistical methods.

=== Religion ===
Census 2021 (1+ %)
Religion	Number	Fraction
Roman Catholic Church	265	85.76%
None	25	8.09%
Not found out	9	2.91%
Evangelical Church	4	1.29%
Total	309	

In year 2021 was 309 people by religion 265 from Roman Catholic Church, 25 from None, 9 from Not found out, 4 from Evangelical Church, 1 from Calvinist Church, 1 from Christian Congregations in Slovakia, 1 from Other, 1 from Greek Catholic Church, 1 from Apostolic Church and 1 from Ad hoc movements.
