= Krnča =

Municipality in Slovakia

Krnča Kerencs
- Municipality
- Flag

- Location of Krnča in the Nitra Region Location of Krnča in Slovakia
- Coordinates: 48.55°N 18.25°E
- Country: Slovakia
- Region: Nitra Region
- District: Topoľčany District
- First mentioned: 1183

Area
  - Total: 18.96 km^{2} (7.32 sq mi)
- Elevation: 216 m (709 ft)

Population (2025)
  - Total: 1,374
- Time zone: UTC+1 (CET)
  - Summer (DST): UTC+2 (CEST)
- Postal code: 956 19
- Area code: +421 38
- Vehicle registration plate (until 2022): TO
- Website: www.krnca.sk

Krnča (Hungarian: Kerencs) is a municipality in the Topoľčany District of the Nitra Region, Slovakia. In 2011 it had 1,339 inhabitants.

== Geography ==
The municipality lies at an altitude of 216 metres (709 ft) and covers an area of 18.96 km^{2} (7.32 sq mi) (2025).

== Population ==
Population statistic (10 years)
Year	1995	2005	2015	2025
Count	1262	1287	1337	1374
Difference		+1.98%	+3.88%	+2.76%

Population statistic
Year	2024	2025
Count	1379	1374
Difference		−0.36%

It has a population of 1374 people (31 December 2025).

=== Ethnicity ===
Census 2021 (1+ %)
Ethnicity	Number	Fraction
Slovak	1339	98.02%
Not found out	24	1.75%
Total	1366	

In year 2021 was 1366 people by ethnicity 1339 as Slovak, 24 as Not found out, 4 as Czech, 3 as Austrian, 3 as Polish, 3 as Hungarian, 2 as Romani, 2 as German, 1 as Ukrainian, 1 as Italian and 1 as English.

Note on population: The difference values of population numbers in the table "Population statistic" and in the sections "Ethnicity" & "Religion" is caused by the use of various statistical methods.

=== Religion ===
Census 2021 (1+ %)
Religion	Number	Fraction
Roman Catholic Church	755	55.27%
Evangelical Church	399	29.21%
None	157	11.49%
Not found out	29	2.12%
Total	1366	

In year 2021 was 1366 people by religion 755 from Roman Catholic Church, 399 from Evangelical Church, 157 from None, 29 from Not found out, 12 from Greek Catholic Church, 6 from Jehovah's Witnesses, 4 from Other, 1 from Eastern Orthodox Church, 1 from Christian Congregations in Slovakia, 1 from United Methodist Church and 1 from Ad hoc movements.
