= Čeľadince =

Municipality in Slovakia

Čeľadince Családka
- Municipality
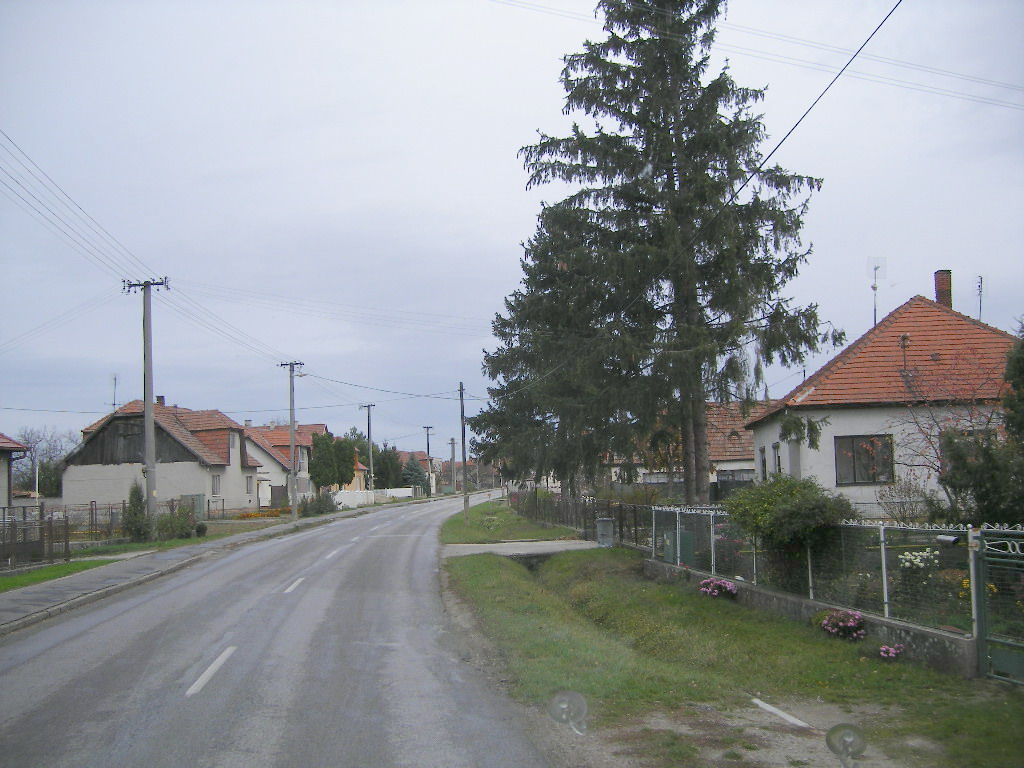

- Flag

- Location of Čeľadince in the Nitra Region Location of Čeľadince in Slovakia
- Coordinates: 48.52°N 18.17°E
- Country: Slovakia
- Region: Nitra Region
- District: Topoľčany District
- First mentioned: 1113

Area
  - Total: 3.25 km^{2} (1.25 sq mi)
- Elevation: 170 m (560 ft)

Population (2025)
  - Total: 512
- Time zone: UTC+1 (CET)
  - Summer (DST): UTC+2 (CEST)
- Postal code: 956 16
- Area code: +421 38
- Vehicle registration plate (until 2022): TO
- Website: celadince.sk

Čeľadince (Hungarian: Családka) is a municipality in the Topoľčany District of the Nitra Region, Slovakia. In 2011 had a population of 446 inhabitants.

== Geography ==
The municipality lies at an altitude of 170 metres (560 ft) and covers an area of 3.25 km^{2} (1.25 sq mi) (2025).

== Etymology ==
The name comes from the Slovak word čeľaď: a family with servants, or alternatively servants at the feudal court.

== Population ==
Population statistic (10 years)
Year	1995	2005	2015	2025
Count	418	442	436	512
Difference		+5.74%	−1.35%	+17.43%

Population statistic
Year	2024	2025
Count	516	512
Difference		−0.77%

It has a population of 512 people (31 December 2025).

=== Ethnicity ===
Census 2021 (1+ %)
Ethnicity	Number	Fraction
Slovak	447	94.7%
Not found out	12	2.54%
Albanian	9	1.9%
Total	472	

In year 2021 was 472 people by ethnicity 447 as Slovak, 12 as Not found out, 9 as Albanian, 3 as French, 2 as Czech, 2 as Rusyn, 2 as Russian, 1 as Moravian, 1 as Hungarian, 1 as Other and 1 as English.

Note on population: The difference values of population numbers in the table "Population statistic" and in the sections "Ethnicity" & "Religion" is caused by the use of various statistical methods.

=== Religion ===
Census 2021 (1+ %)
Religion	Number	Fraction
Evangelical Church	192	40.68%
Roman Catholic Church	161	34.11%
None	82	17.37%
Not found out	15	3.18%
Islam	9	1.91%
Greek Catholic Church	5	1.06%
Total	472	

In year 2021 was 472 people by religion 192 from Evangelical Church, 161 from Roman Catholic Church, 82 from None, 15 from Not found out, 9 from Islam, 5 from Greek Catholic Church, 3 from Other, 2 from Jehovah's Witnesses, 1 from Christian Congregations in Slovakia, 1 from Buddhism and 1 from Ad hoc movements.

== See also ==
- List of municipalities and towns in Slovakia

== Genealogical resources ==
The records for genealogical research are available at the state archive "Statny Archiv in Nitra, Slovakia"

- Roman Catholic church records (births/marriages/deaths): 1831-1895 (parish B)
- Lutheran church records (births/marriages/deaths): 1708-1895 (parish B)
