= Závada, Topoľčany District =

Village and municipality in Slovakia

Závada Nyitrazávod
- Municipality
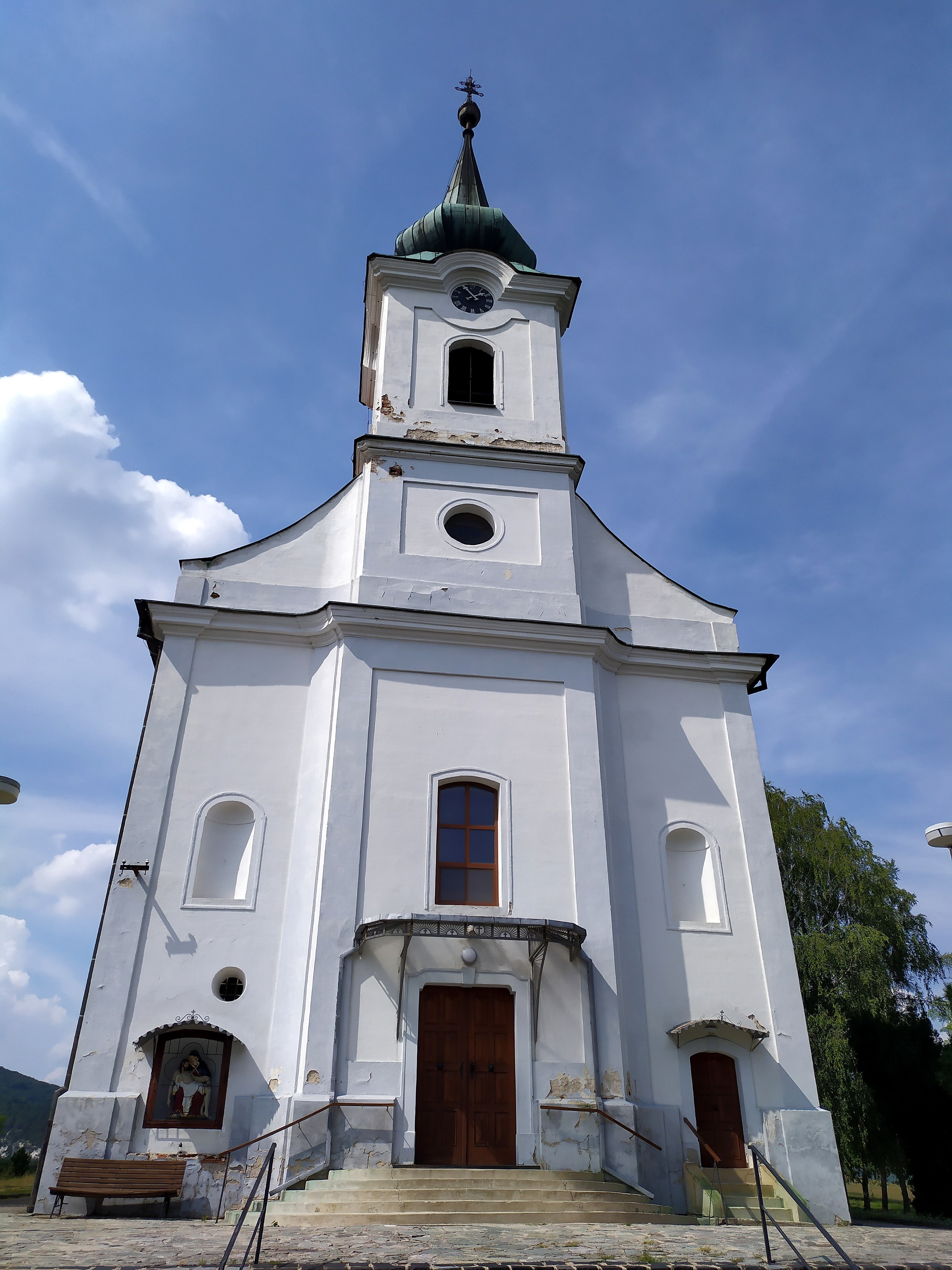
- Church of Saint Michael

- Flag

- Location of Závada district Topoľčany in the Nitra Region Location of Závada district Topoľčany in Slovakia
- Country: Slovakia
- Region: Nitra Region
- District: Topoľčany District
- First mentioned: 1332

Area
  - Total: 8.94 km^{2} (3.45 sq mi)
- Elevation: 247 m (810 ft)

Population (2025)
  - Total: 554
- Time zone: UTC+1 (CET)
  - Summer (DST): UTC+2 (CEST)
- Postal code: 955 01
- Area code: +421 38
- Vehicle registration plate (until 2022): TO
- Website: www.obeczavada.eu

Závada (Hungarian: Nyitrazávod) is a village and municipality in the Topoľčany District of the Nitra Region, Slovakia. In 2011 had the village 591 inhabitants.

== Population ==
Population statistic (10 years)
Year	1995	2005	2015	2025
Count	697	626	573	554
Difference		−10.18%	−8.46%	−3.31%

Population statistic
Year	2024	2025
Count	570	554
Difference		−2.80%

It has a population of 554 people (31 December 2025).

=== Ethnicity ===
Census 2021 (1+ %)
Ethnicity	Number	Fraction
Slovak	584	97.98%
Not found out	12	2.01%
Total	596	

In year 2021 was 596 people by ethnicity 584 as Slovak, 12 as Not found out, 5 as Ukrainian, 3 as Czech and 1 as Greek.

Note on population: The difference values of population numbers in the table "Population statistic" and in the sections "Ethnicity" & "Religion" is caused by the use of various statistical methods.

=== Religion ===
Census 2021 (1+ %)
Religion	Number	Fraction
Roman Catholic Church	499	83.72%
None	63	10.57%
Not found out	8	1.34%
Evangelical Church	8	1.34%
Greek Catholic Church	7	1.17%
Total	596	

In year 2021 was 596 people by religion 499 from Roman Catholic Church, 63 from None, 8 from Not found out, 8 from Evangelical Church, 7 from Greek Catholic Church, 5 from Eastern Orthodox Church, 2 from Christian Congregations in Slovakia, 2 from Ad hoc movements, 1 from Jehovah's Witnesses and 1 from Other.
