= Velušovce =

Velušovce Velős
- Municipality
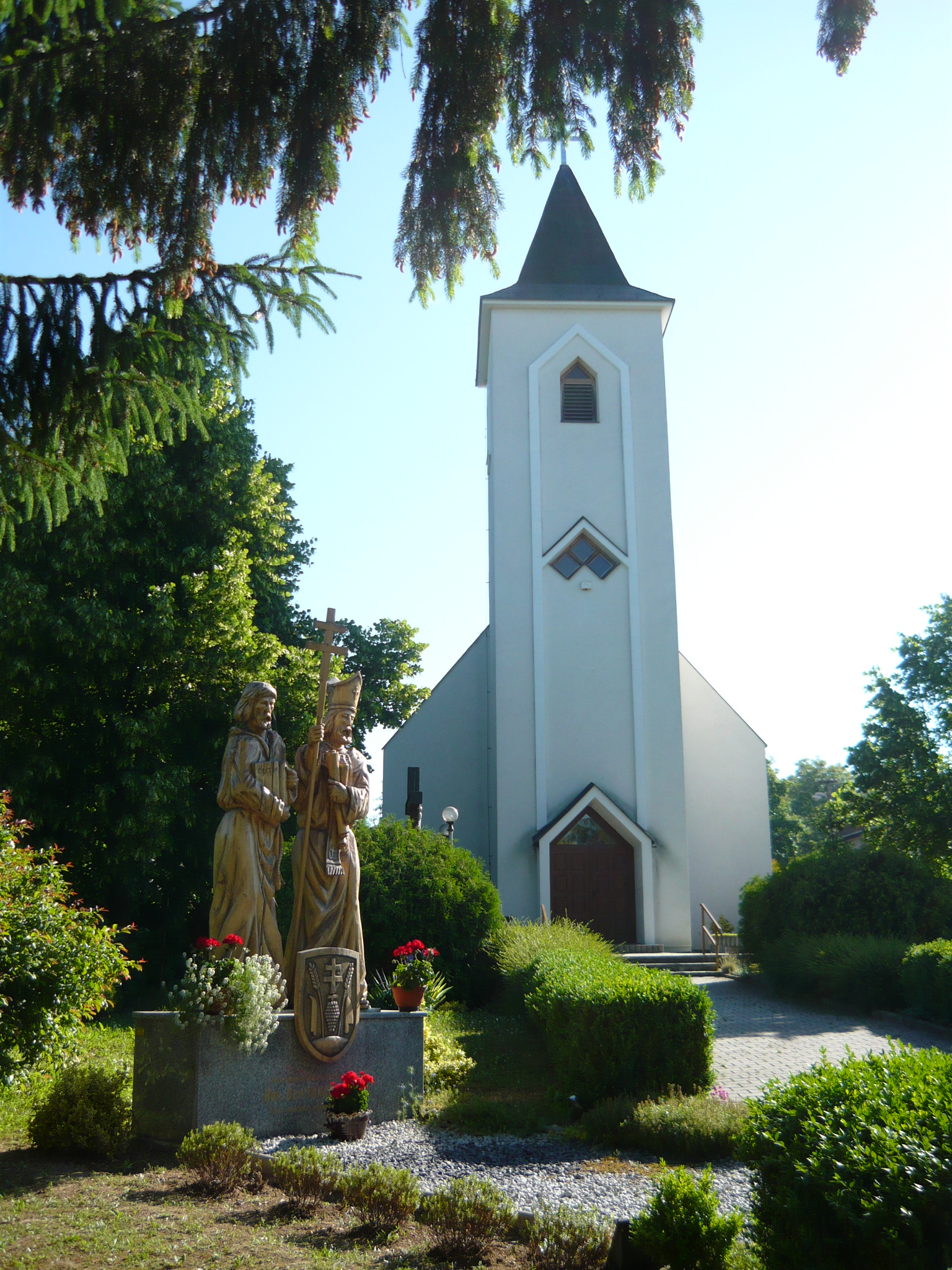

- Flag

- Location of Velušovce in the Nitra Region Location of Velušovce in Slovakia
- Coordinates: 48.63°N 18.10°E
- Country: Slovakia
- Region: Nitra Region
- District: Topoľčany District
- First mentioned: 1389

Area
  - Total: 5.81 km^{2} (2.24 sq mi)
- Elevation: 224 m (735 ft)

Population (2025)
  - Total: 551
- Time zone: UTC+1 (CET)
  - Summer (DST): UTC+2 (CEST)
- Postal code: 955 01
- Area code: +421 38
- Vehicle registration plate (until 2022): TO
- Website: www.velusovce.sk

Velušovce (Hungarian: Velős) is a municipality in the Topoľčany District of the Nitra Region, Slovakia. In 2011 it had 506 inhabitants.

== Geography ==
The municipality lies at an altitude of 224 metres (735 ft) and covers an area of 5.81 km^{2} (2.24 sq mi) (2025).

== Population ==
Population statistic (10 years)
Year	1995	2005	2015	2025
Count	495	513	497	551
Difference		+3.63%	−3.11%	+10.86%

Population statistic
Year	2024	2025
Count	542	551
Difference		+1.66%

It has a population of 551 people (31 December 2025).

=== Ethnicity ===
Census 2021 (1+ %)
Ethnicity	Number	Fraction
Slovak	511	97.51%
Not found out	11	2.09%
Total	524	

In year 2021 was 524 people by ethnicity 511 as Slovak, 11 as Not found out, 4 as Czech, 2 as Italian, 1 as Russian, 1 as Polish, 1 as Greek and 1 as Croatian.

Note on population: The difference values of population numbers in the table "Population statistic" and in the sections "Ethnicity" & "Religion" is caused by the use of various statistical methods.

=== Religion ===
Census 2021 (1+ %)
Religion	Number	Fraction
Roman Catholic Church	458	87.4%
None	48	9.16%
Not found out	11	2.1%
Total	524	

In year 2021 was 524 people by religion 458 from Roman Catholic Church, 48 from None, 11 from Not found out, 3 from Greek Catholic Church, 2 from Paganism and natural spirituality, 1 from Christian Congregations in Slovakia and 1 from Evangelical Church.
