= Urmince =

Urmince Nyitraörmény
- Municipality
- Flag

- Location of Urmince in the Nitra Region Location of Urmince in Slovakia
- Coordinates: 48.53°N 18.10°E
- Country: Slovakia
- Region: Nitra Region
- District: Topoľčany District
- First mentioned: 1291

Area
  - Total: 10.90 km^{2} (4.21 sq mi)
- Elevation: 180 m (590 ft)

Population (2025)
  - Total: 1,386
- Time zone: UTC+1 (CET)
  - Summer (DST): UTC+2 (CEST)
- Postal code: 956 02
- Area code: +421 38
- Vehicle registration plate (until 2022): TO
- Website: www.urmince.sk

Urmince (Hungarian: Nyitraörmény) is a municipality in the Topoľčany District of the Nitra Region, Slovakia. It lies approximately 679 ft above sea level. In 2011 it had 1408 inhabitants.

== Geography ==
The municipality lies at an altitude of 180 metres (590 ft) and covers an area of 10.90 km^{2} (4.21 sq mi) (2025).

== Population ==
Population statistic (10 years)
Year	1995	2005	2015	2025
Count	1377	1410	1388	1386
Difference		+2.39%	−1.56%	−0.14%

Population statistic
Year	2024	2025
Count	1381	1386
Difference		+0.36%

It has a population of 1386 people (31 December 2025).

=== Ethnicity ===
Census 2021 (1+ %)
Ethnicity	Number	Fraction
Slovak	1331	94.93%
Not found out	69	4.92%
Total	1402	

In year 2021 was 1402 people by ethnicity 1331 as Slovak, 69 as Not found out, 3 as Czech, 3 as Italian, 3 as Russian, 3 as Romanian, 2 as Irish, 1 as Vietnamese, 1 as Ukrainian, 1 as Rusyn, 1 as Hungarian and 1 as Other.

Note on population: The difference values of population numbers in the table "Population statistic" and in the sections "Ethnicity" & "Religion" is caused by the use of various statistical methods.

=== Religion ===
Census 2021 (1+ %)
Religion	Number	Fraction
Roman Catholic Church	1137	81.1%
None	159	11.34%
Not found out	66	4.71%
Total	1402	

In year 2021 was 1402 people by religion 1137 from Roman Catholic Church, 159 from None, 66 from Not found out, 12 from Greek Catholic Church, 8 from Evangelical Church, 8 from Ad hoc movements, 4 from Paganism and natural spirituality, 3 from Christian Congregations in Slovakia, 3 from Buddhism, 1 from Jewish community and 1 from Calvinist Church.
