= Tesáre =

Municipality in Slovakia

Tesáre Nyitrateszér
- Municipality
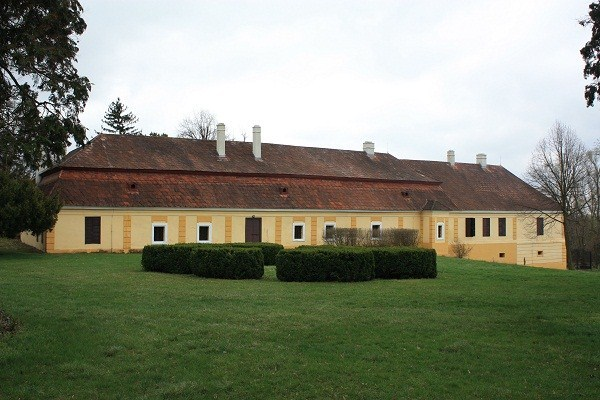

- Flag

- Location of Tesáre in the Nitra Region Location of Tesáre in Slovakia
- Coordinates: 48.60°N 18.08°E
- Country: Slovakia
- Region: Nitra Region
- District: Topoľčany District
- First mentioned: 1390

Area
  - Total: 13.53 km^{2} (5.22 sq mi)
- Elevation: 207 m (679 ft)

Population (2025)
  - Total: 729
- Time zone: UTC+1 (CET)
  - Summer (DST): UTC+2 (CEST)
- Postal code: 956 21
- Area code: +421 38
- Vehicle registration plate (until 2022): TO
- Website: www.tesare.sk

Tesáre (Hungarian: Nyitrateszér) is municipality in the Topoľčany District of the Nitra Region, Slovakia. In 2011 it had 712 inhabitants.

== Geography ==
The municipality lies at an altitude of 207 metres (679 ft) and covers an area of 13.53 km^{2} (5.22 sq mi) (2025).

== Population ==
Population statistic (10 years)
Year	1995	2005	2015	2025
Count	685	720	732	729
Difference		+5.10%	+1.66%	−0.40%

Population statistic
Year	2024	2025
Count	704	729
Difference		+3.55%

It has a population of 729 people (31 December 2025).

=== Ethnicity ===
Census 2021 (1+ %)
Ethnicity	Number	Fraction
Slovak	711	97.39%
Not found out	12	1.64%
Total	730	

In year 2021 was 730 people by ethnicity 711 as Slovak, 12 as Not found out, 6 as Rusyn, 4 as Czech, 3 as Croatian, 2 as Austrian, 1 as Romani, 1 as German and 1 as Hungarian.

Note on population: The difference values of population numbers in the table "Population statistic" and in the sections "Ethnicity" & "Religion" is caused by the use of various statistical methods.

=== Religion ===
Census 2021 (1+ %)
Religion	Number	Fraction
Roman Catholic Church	566	77.53%
None	104	14.25%
Eastern Orthodox Church	13	1.78%
Not found out	13	1.78%
Evangelical Church	10	1.37%
Total	730	

In year 2021 was 730 people by religion 566 from Roman Catholic Church, 104 from None, 13 from Eastern Orthodox Church, 13 from Not found out, 10 from Evangelical Church, 6 from Other, 5 from Christian Congregations in Slovakia, 4 from Greek Catholic Church, 3 from Jehovah's Witnesses, 2 from Calvinist Church, 2 from Ad hoc movements, 1 from Church of the Brethren and 1 from Buddhism.
