= Lužany (Topoľčany) =

Municipality in Slovakia

Lužany Sarlóska
- Municipality
- Flag

- Location of Lužany in the Nitra Region Location of Lužany in Slovakia
- Country: Slovakia
- Region: Nitra Region
- District: Topoľčany District
- First mentioned: 1399

Area
  - Total: 3.89 km^{2} (1.50 sq mi)
- Elevation: 179 m (587 ft)

Population (2025)
  - Total: 229
- Time zone: UTC+1 (CET)
  - Summer (DST): UTC+2 (CEST)
- Postal code: 956 07
- Area code: +421 38
- Vehicle registration plate (until 2022): TO
- Website: www.obec-luzany.sk

Lužany (Hungarian: Sarlóska) is a municipality in the Topoľčany District of the Nitra Region, Slovakia. In 2011 it had 203 inhabitants.

== Geography ==
The municipality lies at an altitude of 179 metres (587 ft) and covers an area of 3.89 km^{2} (1.50 sq mi) (2025).

== Population ==
Population statistic (10 years)
Year	1995	2005	2015	2025
Count	204	209	202	229
Difference		+2.45%	−3.34%	+13.36%

Population statistic
Year	2024	2025
Count	224	229
Difference		+2.23%

It has a population of 229 people (31 December 2025).

=== Ethnicity ===
Census 2021 (1+ %)
Ethnicity	Number	Fraction
Slovak	223	99.11%
Total	225	

In year 2021 was 225 people by ethnicity 223 as Slovak, 1 as Czech, 1 as Romani, 1 as Romanian, 1 as Hungarian and 1 as French.

Note on population: The difference values of population numbers in the table "Population statistic" and in the sections "Ethnicity" & "Religion" is caused by the use of various statistical methods.

=== Religion ===
Census 2021 (1+ %)
Religion	Number	Fraction
Roman Catholic Church	193	85.78%
None	14	6.22%
Christian Congregations in Slovakia	7	3.11%
Ad hoc movements	5	2.22%
Calvinist Church	3	1.33%
Total	225	

In year 2021 was 225 people by religion 193 from Roman Catholic Church, 14 from None, 7 from Christian Congregations in Slovakia, 5 from Ad hoc movements, 3 from Calvinist Church, 2 from Other and 1 from Evangelical Church.
