= Tvrdomestice =

Municipality in Slovakia

Tvrdomestice Tordaméc
- Municipality
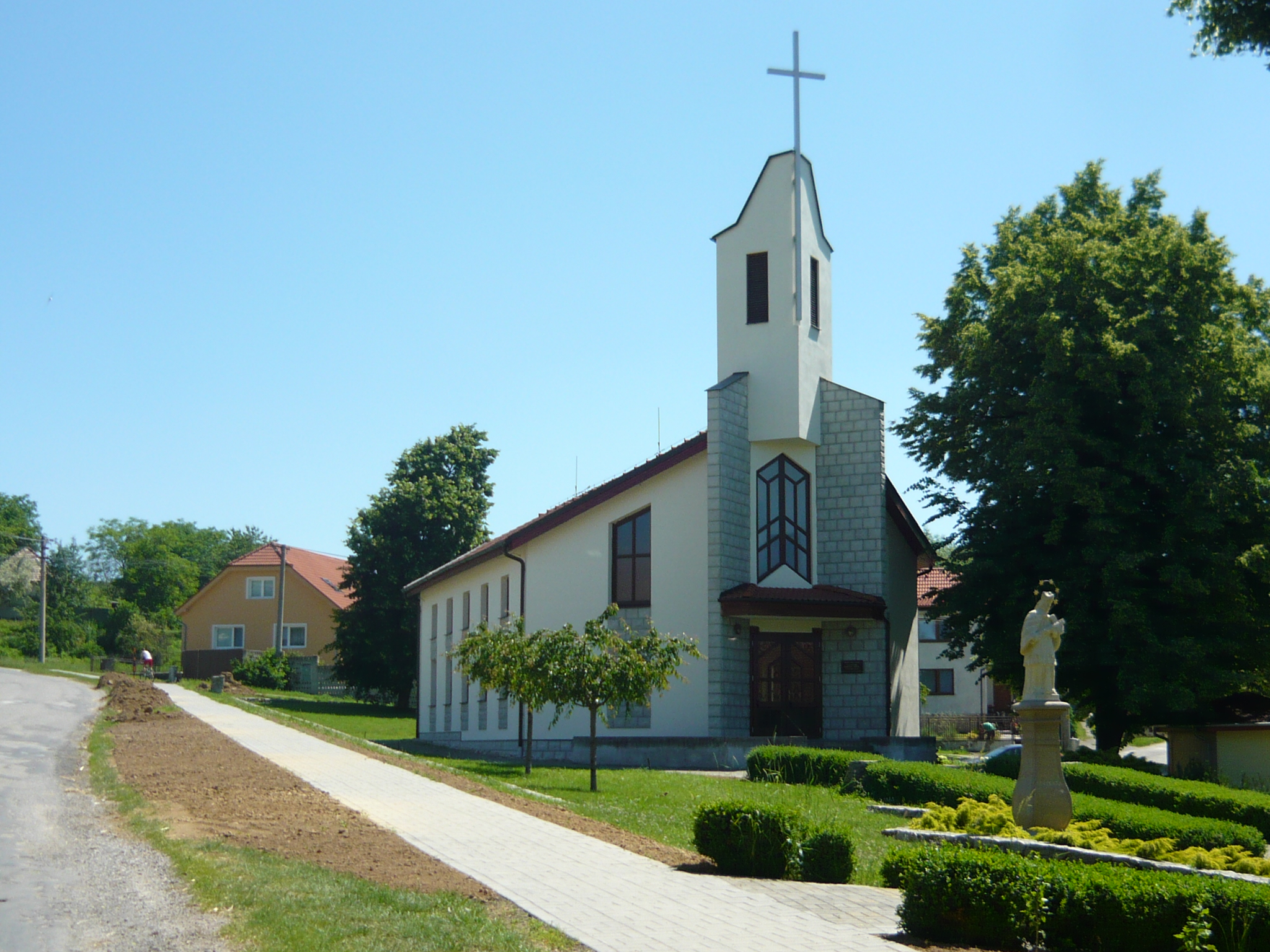

- Flag

- Location of Tvrdomestice in the Nitra Region Location of Tvrdomestice in Slovakia
- Coordinates: 48.63°N 18.13°E
- Country: Slovakia
- Region: Nitra Region
- District: Topoľčany District
- First mentioned: 1280

Area
  - Total: 8.79 km^{2} (3.39 sq mi)
- Elevation: 234 m (768 ft)

Population (2025)
  - Total: 445
- Time zone: UTC+1 (CET)
  - Summer (DST): UTC+2 (CEST)
- Postal code: 956 22
- Area code: +421 38
- Vehicle registration plate (until 2022): TO
- Website: www.obec-tvrdomestice.sk

Tvrdomestice (Hungarian: Tordaméc) is a municipality in the Topoľčany District of the Nitra Region, Slovakia. In 2016 it had 450 inhabitants.

== Geography ==
The municipality lies at an altitude of 234 metres (768 ft) and covers an area of 8.79 km^{2} (3.39 sq mi) (2025).

== Population ==
Population statistic (10 years)
Year	1995	2005	2015	2025
Count	465	481	452	445
Difference		+3.44%	−6.02%	−1.54%

Population statistic
Year	2024	2025
Count	455	445
Difference		−2.19%

It has a population of 445 people (31 December 2025).

=== Ethnicity ===
Census 2021 (1+ %)
Ethnicity	Number	Fraction
Slovak	450	98.68%
Not found out	5	1.09%
Total	456	

In year 2021 was 456 people by ethnicity 450 as Slovak, 5 as Not found out, 4 as Ukrainian, 1 as Czech and 1 as Other.

Note on population: The difference values of population numbers in the table "Population statistic" and in the sections "Ethnicity" & "Religion" is caused by the use of various statistical methods.

=== Religion ===
Census 2021 (1+ %)
Religion	Number	Fraction
Roman Catholic Church	390	85.53%
None	43	9.43%
Other	6	1.32%
Not found out	5	1.1%
Ad hoc movements	5	1.1%
Total	456	

In year 2021 was 456 people by religion 390 from Roman Catholic Church, 43 from None, 6 from Other, 5 from Not found out, 5 from Ad hoc movements, 3 from Calvinist Church, 2 from Greek Catholic Church, 1 from Christian Congregations in Slovakia and 1 from Buddhism.
