= Topoľčany District =

Coordinates: 48.5583°N 18.2069°E

- District
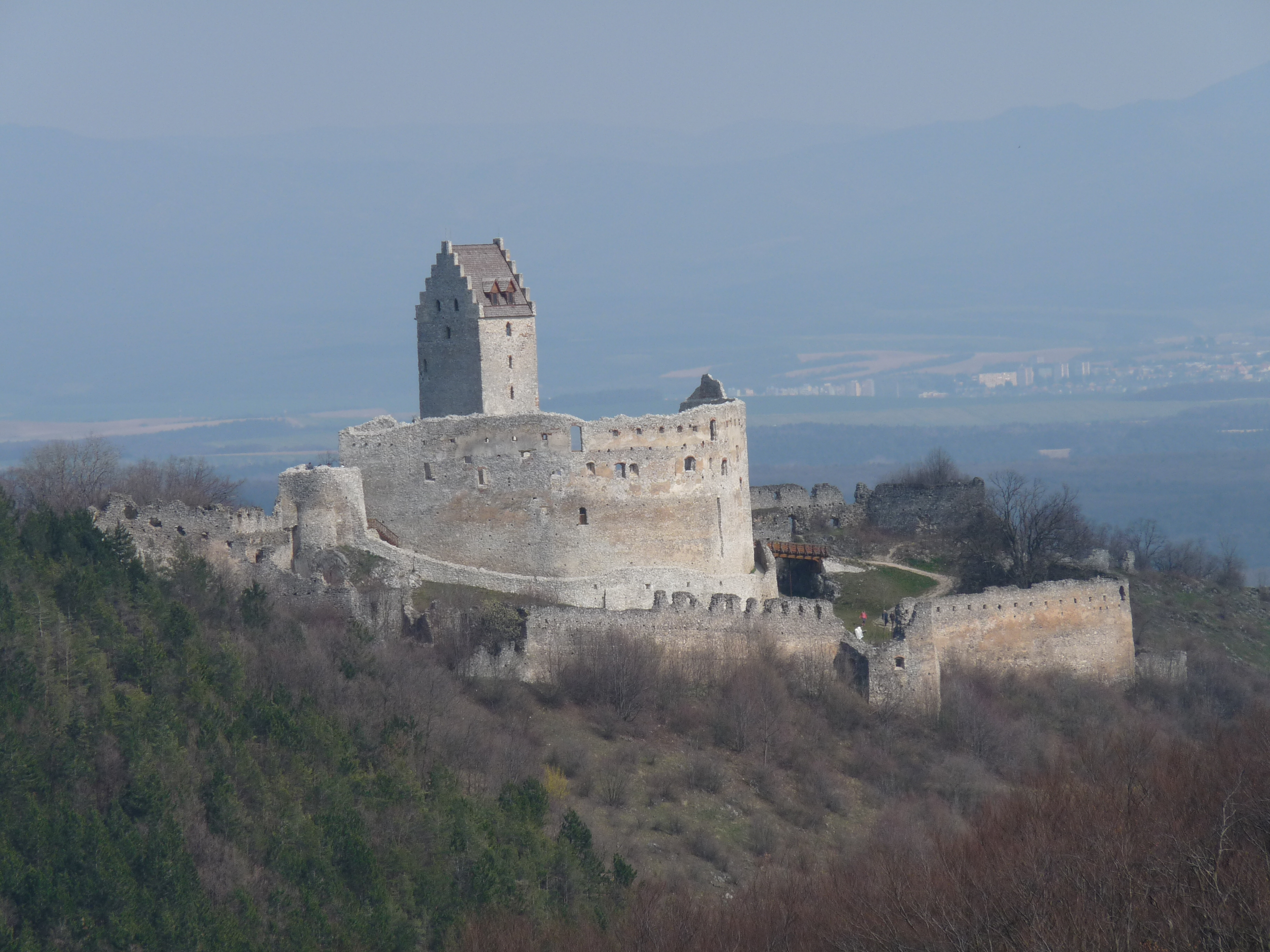
- Country: Slovakia
- Region: Nitra Region
- Seat: Topoľčany

Area
  - Total: 597.62 km^{2} (230.74 sq mi)

Population (2025)
  - Total: 68,831
- Time zone: UTC+1 (CET)
  - Summer (DST): UTC+2 (CEST)
- Telephone prefix: 38
- Vehicle registration plate (until 2022): TO
- Municipalities: 54

Topoľčany District (Slovak: okres Topoľčany) is a district in the Nitra Region of western Slovakia. It borders Nové Mesto nad Váhom District and Bánovce nad Bebravou District in the north, Piešťany District and Hlohovec District in the west, Partizánske District in the east and Nitra District and Zlaté Moravce District in the south. The district in its present form was established in 1996, before that date Topoľčany district had been composed of two present districts, Topoľčany District and Partizánske District.

== Population ==
Population statistic (10 years)
Year	1995	2005	2015	2025
Count	74,246	74,054	71,247	68,831
Difference		−0.25%	−3.79%	−3.39%

Population statistic
Year	2024	2025
Count	69,278	68,831
Difference		−0.64%

It has a population of 68,831 people (31 December 2025).

Historical population
Year	Pop.	±%
1970	67,645	—
1980	72,130	+6.6%
1991	74,136	+2.8%
2001	74,089	−0.1%
2011	72,257	−2.5%
2021	70,877	−1.9%
Source: Statistical Office of the Slovak Republic

=== Ethnicity ===
Census 2021 (1+ %)
Ethnicity	Number	Fraction
Slovak	66,912	93.02%
Not found out	3535	4.91%
Total	71,928	

In year 2021 was 71,928 people by ethnicity 66,912 as Slovak, 3535 as Not found out, 413 as Czech, 191 as Other, 147 as Hungarian, 98 as Russian, 97 as Romanian, 85 as Romani, 84 as Ukrainian, 58 as German, 50 as Rusyn, 41 as Polish, 38 as Italian, 31 as Vietnamese, 26 as Albanian, 15 as Austrian, 14 as Moravian, 13 as Croatian, 13 as English, 11 as Canadian, 9 as Jewish, 8 as French, 7 as Chinese, 7 as Greek, 6 as Irish, 6 as Serbian, 6 as Bulgarian, 5 as Turkish, 1 as Silesian and 1 as Iranian.

Note on population: The difference values of population numbers in the table "Population statistic" and in the sections "Ethnicity" & "Religion" is caused by the use of various statistical methods.

=== Religion ===
Census 2021 (1+ %)
Religion	Number	Fraction
Roman Catholic Church	51,823	73.12%
None	11,406	16.09%
Not found out	4037	5.7%
Evangelical Church	1920	2.71%
Total	70,877	

In year 2021 was 70,877 people by religion 51,823 from Roman Catholic Church, 11,406 from None, 4037 from Not found out, 1920 from Evangelical Church, 331 from Greek Catholic Church, 223 from Ad hoc movements, 210 from Christian Congregations in Slovakia, 163 from Other, 126 from Eastern Orthodox Church, 104 from Jehovah's Witnesses, 81 from Paganism and natural spirituality, 73 from Calvinist Church, 71 from Buddhism, 67 from Apostolic Church, 60 from Islam, 57 from Other and not ascertained christian church, 57 from Seventh-day Adventist Church, 25 from Old Catholic Church, 11 from United Methodist Church, 10 from Czechoslovak Hussite Church, 8 from Hinduism, 7 from Jewish community, 5 from Baptists Church, 1 from New Apostolic Church and 1 from Church of the Brethren.

== Municipalities ==
Municipality	Area [km^{2}]	Population
Ardanovce	6.73	230
Belince	2.09	378
Biskupová	3.30	242
Blesovce	5.07	327
Bojná	33.80	1,959
Čeľadince	3.25	512
Čermany	10.83	369
Dvorany nad Nitrou	4.52	830
Hajná Nová Ves	6.37	350
Horné Chlebany	3.79	375
Horné Obdokovce	22.89	1,461
Horné Štitáre	5.68	651
Hrušovany	5.54	1,047
Chrabrany	7.95	941
Jacovce	10.06	1,756
Kamanová	6.41	601
Koniarovce	3.60	663
Kovarce	25.04	1,502
Krnča	18.96	1,374
Krtovce	4.20	293
Krušovce	13.22	1,703
Kuzmice	0.00	770
Lipovník	6.44	311
Ludanice	11.20	1,717
Lužany	3.89	229
Malé Ripňany	8.51	550
Nemčice	7.95	930
Nemečky	6.27	320
Nitrianska Blatnica	14.38	1,224
Nitrianska Streda	13.95	747
Norovce	6.33	323
Oponice	12.29	822
Orešany	6.71	316
Podhradie	30.10	289
Prašice	28.24	1,945
Práznovce	11.43	967
Preseľany	11.90	1,486
Radošina	27.66	1,847
Rajčany	5.85	534
Solčany	20.01	2,450
Solčianky	2.66	272
Súlovce	12.64	546
Svrbice	6.93	197
Šalgovce	8.98	453
Tesáre	13.53	729
Topoľčany	35.88	23,638
Tovarníky	5.41	1,559
Tvrdomestice	8.79	445
Urmince	10.90	1,386
Veľké Dvorany	7.74	754
Veľké Ripňany	23.68	2,081
Velušovce	5.81	551
Vozokany	9.11	325
Závada	8.94	554

Population and area values are current for year 2025.
