= Veľké Ripňany =

Veľké Ripňany Veľké Ripňany
- Municipality
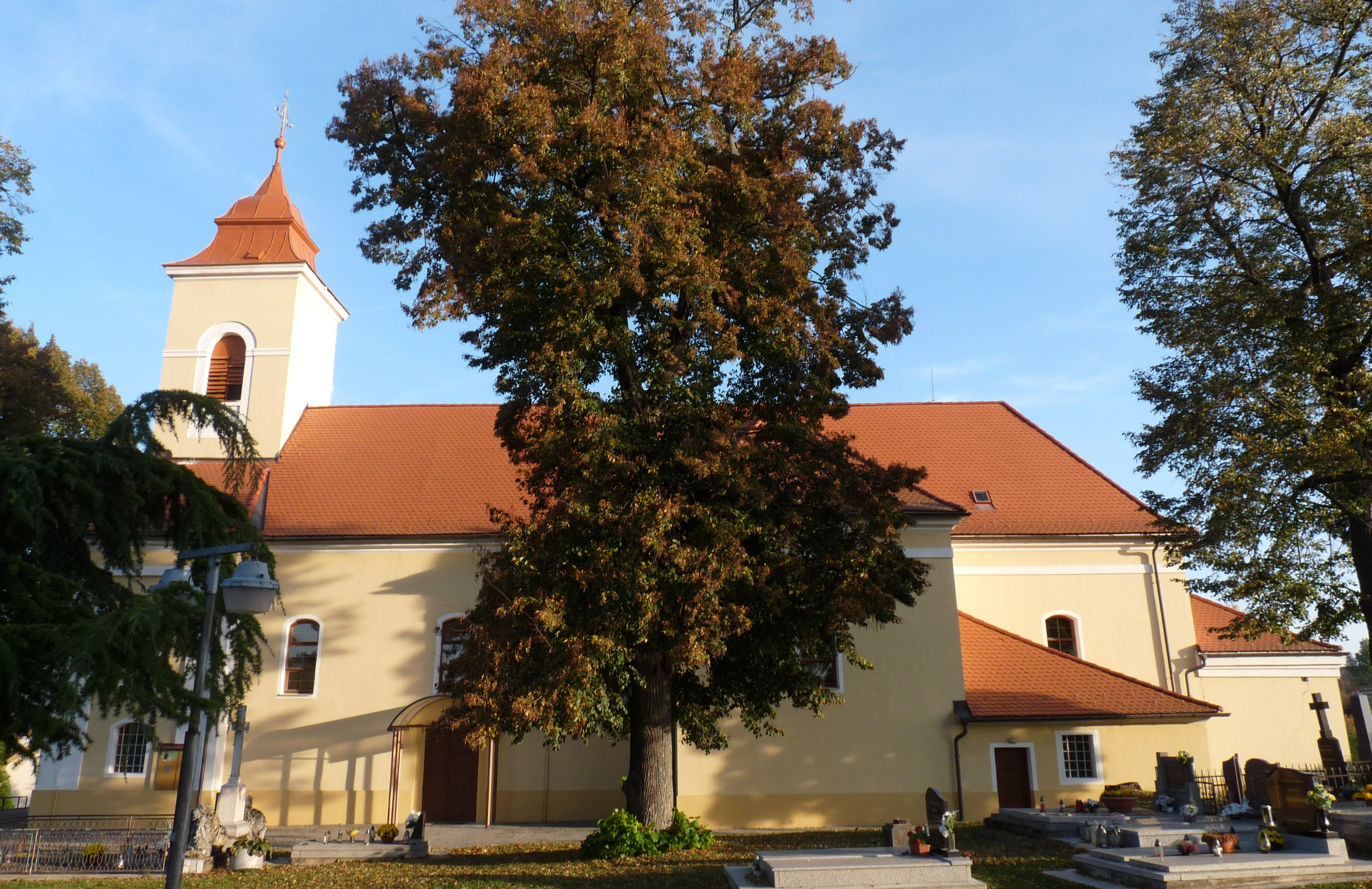
- Church of Saint John of Nepomuk

- Flag

- Location of Veľké Ripňany in the Nitra Region Location of Veľké Ripňany in Slovakia
- Coordinates: 48.50°N 17.98°E
- Country: Slovakia
- Region: Nitra Region
- District: Topoľčany District
- First mentioned: 1156

Area
  - Total: 23.68 km^{2} (9.14 sq mi)
- Elevation: 166 m (545 ft)

Population (2025)
  - Total: 2,081
- Time zone: UTC+1 (CET)
  - Summer (DST): UTC+2 (CEST)
- Postal code: 956 07
- Area code: +421 38
- Vehicle registration plate (until 2022): TO
- Website: www.velkeripnany.sk

Veľké Ripňany (Hungarian: Nagyrépény) is a village and municipality in the Topoľčany District of the Nitra Region, Slovakia. In 2011 the village had 2071 inhabitants.

== Geography ==
The municipality lies at an altitude of 166 metres (545 ft) and covers an area of 23.68 km^{2} (9.14 sq mi) (2025).

== Population ==
Population statistic (10 years)
Year	1995	2005	2015	2025
Count	2125	2136	2091	2081
Difference		+0.51%	−2.10%	−0.47%

Population statistic
Year	2024	2025
Count	2094	2081
Difference		−0.62%

It has a population of 2081 people (31 December 2025).

=== Ethnicity ===
Census 2021 (1+ %)
Ethnicity	Number	Fraction
Slovak	2020	96%
Not found out	73	3.46%
Total	2104	

In year 2021 was 2104 people by ethnicity 2020 as Slovak, 73 as Not found out, 7 as Rusyn, 6 as Czech, 5 as Russian, 3 as Ukrainian, 3 as Italian, 3 as Polish, 3 as German, 3 as Hungarian, 2 as Romani, 1 as Romanian, 1 as Greek and 1 as English.

Note on population: The difference values of population numbers in the table "Population statistic" and in the sections "Ethnicity" & "Religion" is caused by the use of various statistical methods.

=== Religion ===
Census 2021 (1+ %)
Religion	Number	Fraction
Roman Catholic Church	1761	83.7%
None	227	10.79%
Not found out	62	2.95%
Total	2104	

In year 2021 was 2104 people by religion 1761 from Roman Catholic Church, 227 from None, 62 from Not found out, 20 from Evangelical Church, 14 from Greek Catholic Church, 6 from Other, 5 from Christian Congregations in Slovakia, 4 from Eastern Orthodox Church, 2 from Calvinist Church, 2 from Buddhism and 1 from Other and not ascertained christian church.
