= Dvorany nad Nitrou =

Municipality in Slovakia

Dvorany nad Nitrou Farkasudvar
- Municipality
- Flag

- Location of Dvorany nad Nitrou in the Nitra Region Location of Dvorany nad Nitrou in Slovakia
- Coordinates: 48.48°N 18.12°E
- Country: Slovakia
- Region: Nitra Region
- District: Topoľčany District
- First mentioned: 1285

Government
  - Mayor: Jozef Kmeť (Independent)

Area
  - Total: 4.52 km^{2} (1.75 sq mi)
- Elevation: 158 m (518 ft)

Population (2025)
  - Total: 830
- Time zone: UTC+1 (CET)
  - Summer (DST): UTC+2 (CEST)
- Postal code: 956 11
- Area code: +421 38
- Vehicle registration plate (until 2022): TO
- Website: www.obecdvoranynadnitrou.sk

Dvorany nad Nitrou (Hungarian: Farkasudvar) is a municipality in the Topoľčany District of the Nitra Region, Slovakia. In 2011 had a population of 754 inhabitants.

== See also ==
- List of municipalities and towns in Slovakia

== Geography ==
The municipality lies at an altitude of 158 metres (518 ft) and covers an area of 4.52 km^{2} (1.75 sq mi) (2025).

== Population ==
Population statistic (10 years)
Year	1995	2005	2015	2025
Count	705	767	757	830
Difference		+8.79%	−1.30%	+9.64%

Population statistic
Year	2024	2025
Count	814	830
Difference		+1.96%

It has a population of 830 people (31 December 2025).

=== Ethnicity ===
Census 2021 (1+ %)
Ethnicity	Number	Fraction
Slovak	763	95.49%
Not found out	38	4.75%
Total	799	

In year 2021 was 799 people by ethnicity 763 as Slovak, 38 as Not found out, 5 as Other, 2 as Italian, 1 as Czech, 1 as Rusyn and 1 as Russian.

Note on population: The difference values of population numbers in the table "Population statistic" and in the sections "Ethnicity" & "Religion" is caused by the use of various statistical methods.

=== Religion ===
Census 2021 (1+ %)
Religion	Number	Fraction
Roman Catholic Church	680	85.11%
None	68	8.51%
Not found out	36	4.51%
Total	799	

In year 2021 was 799 people by religion 680 from Roman Catholic Church, 68 from None, 36 from Not found out, 5 from Other, 2 from Paganism and natural spirituality, 2 from Greek Catholic Church, 2 from Evangelical Church, 2 from Ad hoc movements, 1 from Other and not ascertained christian church and 1 from Christian Congregations in Slovakia.

== Genealogical resources ==
The records for genealogical research are available at the state archive "Statny Archiv in Nitra, Slovakia"

- Roman Catholic church records (births/marriages/deaths): 1758-1895 (parish B)
