= Biskupová =

Village and municipality in Slovakia

Biskupová Püspökfalu
- Municipality
- Flag

- Location of Biskupová in the Nitra Region Location of Biskupová in Slovakia
- Coordinates: 48.47°N 17.98°E
- Country: Slovakia
- Region: Nitra Region
- District: Topoľčany District
- First mentioned: 1326

Area
  - Total: 3.30 km^{2} (1.27 sq mi)
- Elevation: 163 m (535 ft)

Population (2025)
  - Total: 242
- Time zone: UTC+1 (CET)
  - Summer (DST): UTC+2 (CEST)
- Postal code: 956 07
- Area code: +421 38
- Vehicle registration plate (until 2022): TO
- Website: www.biskupova.sk

Biskupová (Hungarian: Püspökfalu) is a village and municipality in the Topoľčany District of the Nitra Region, Slovakia. In 2011 the village had 220 inhabitants.

== Geography ==
The municipality lies at an altitude of 163 metres (535 ft) and covers an area of 3.30 km^{2} (1.27 sq mi) (2025).

== Population ==
Population statistic (10 years)
Year	1995	2005	2015	2025
Count	199	236	245	242
Difference		+18.59%	+3.81%	−1.22%

Population statistic
Year	2024	2025
Count	241	242
Difference		+0.41%

It has a population of 242 people (31 December 2025).

=== Ethnicity ===
Census 2021 (1+ %)
Ethnicity	Number	Fraction
Slovak	229	93.85%
Not found out	14	5.73%
Romanian	3	1.22%
Total	244	

In year 2021 was 244 people by ethnicity 229 as Slovak, 14 as Not found out, 3 as Romanian, 2 as Other, 1 as Czech, 1 as Ukrainian, 1 as Romani, 1 as Polish and 1 as Hungarian.

Note on population: The difference values of population numbers in the table "Population statistic" and in the sections "Ethnicity" & "Religion" is caused by the use of various statistical methods.

=== Religion ===
Census 2021 (1+ %)
Religion	Number	Fraction
Roman Catholic Church	181	74.18%
None	36	14.75%
Not found out	12	4.92%
Evangelical Church	11	4.51%
Total	244	

In year 2021 was 244 people by religion 181 from Roman Catholic Church, 36 from None, 12 from Not found out, 11 from Evangelical Church, 1 from Calvinist Church, 1 from Eastern Orthodox Church, 1 from Greek Catholic Church and 1 from Buddhism.

== See also ==
- List of municipalities and towns in Slovakia

== Genealogical resources ==
The records for genealogical research are available at the state archive "Statny Archiv in Bratislava, Nitra, Slovakia"

- Roman Catholic church records (births/marriages/deaths): 1823-1897 (parish B)
