= Norovce =

Norovce Onor
- Municipality
- Flag

- Location of Norovce in the Nitra Region Location of Norovce in Slovakia
- Coordinates: 48.63°N 18.18°E
- Country: Slovakia
- Region: Nitra Region
- District: Topoľčany District
- First mentioned: 1113

Area
  - Total: 6.33 km^{2} (2.44 sq mi)
- Elevation: 215 m (705 ft)

Population (2025)
  - Total: 323
- Time zone: UTC+1 (CET)
  - Summer (DST): UTC+2 (CEST)
- Postal code: 956 38
- Area code: +421 38
- Vehicle registration plate (until 2022): TO
- Website: www.obecnorovce.sk

Norovce (Hungarian: Onor) is a municipality in the Topoľčany District of the Nitra Region, Slovakia. In 2011 it had 326 inhabitants.

== Geography ==
The municipality lies at an altitude of 215 metres (705 ft) and covers an area of 6.33 km^{2} (2.44 sq mi) (2025).

== Population ==
Population statistic (10 years)
Year	1995	2005	2015	2025
Count	363	336	322	323
Difference		−7.43%	−4.16%	+0.31%

Population statistic
Year	2024	2025
Count	314	323
Difference		+2.86%

It has a population of 323 people (31 December 2025).

=== Ethnicity ===
Census 2021 (1+ %)
Ethnicity	Number	Fraction
Slovak	315	94.02%
Not found out	17	5.07%
Czech	4	1.19%
Total	335	

In year 2021 was 335 people by ethnicity 315 as Slovak, 17 as Not found out, 4 as Czech, 1 as Russian and 1 as Other.

Note on population: The difference values of population numbers in the table "Population statistic" and in the sections "Ethnicity" & "Religion" is caused by the use of various statistical methods.

=== Religion ===
Census 2021 (1+ %)
Religion	Number	Fraction
Roman Catholic Church	256	76.42%
None	50	14.93%
Not found out	19	5.67%
Evangelical Church	6	1.79%
Total	335	

In year 2021 was 335 people by religion 256 from Roman Catholic Church, 50 from None, 19 from Not found out, 6 from Evangelical Church, 1 from Eastern Orthodox Church, 1 from Islam, 1 from Other and 1 from Greek Catholic Church.
