= Solčianky =

Municipality in Slovakia

Solčianky Szolcsányka
- Municipality
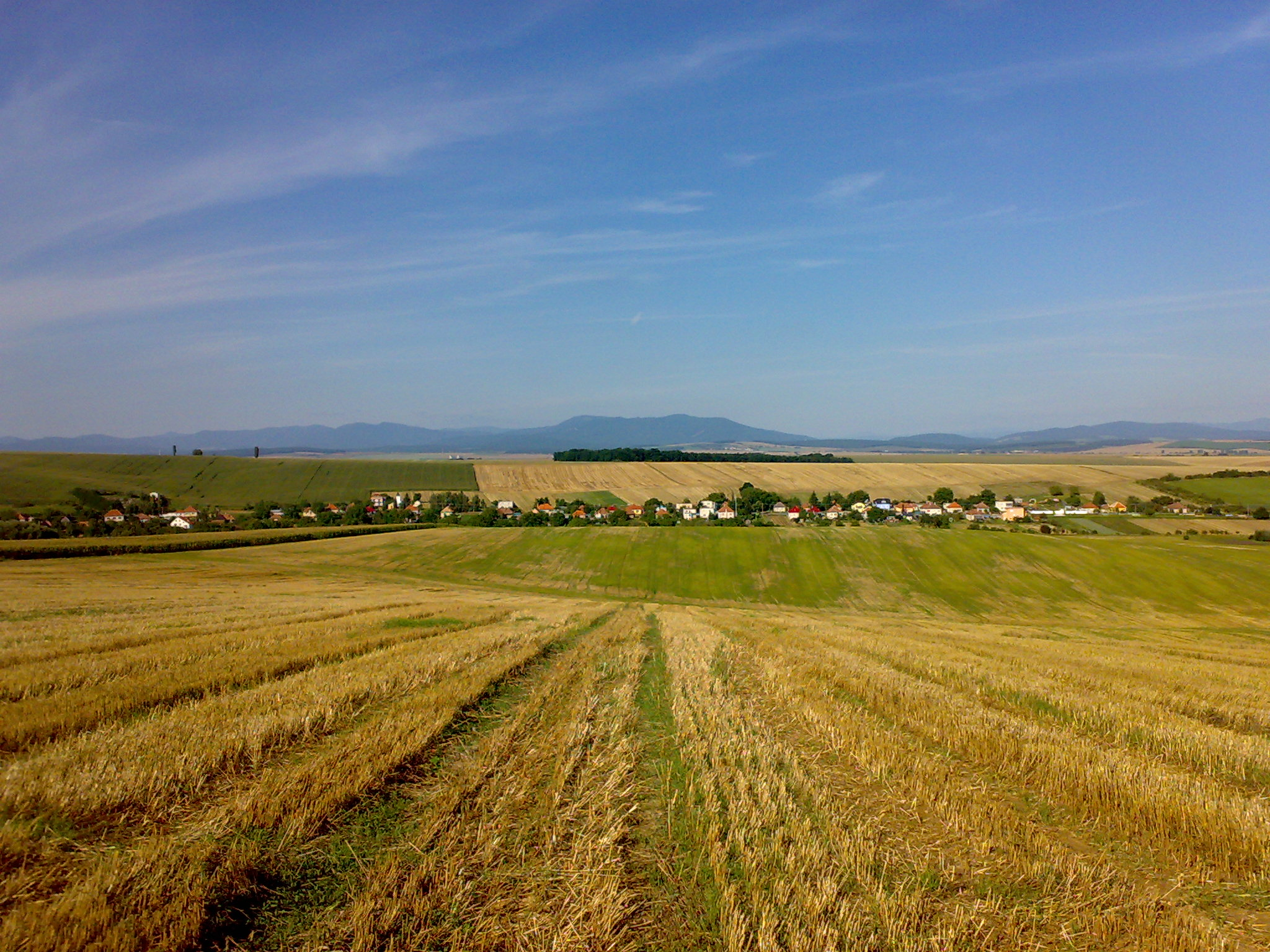
- Village view from the south

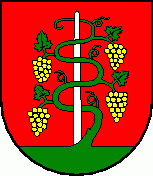
- Flag Coat of arms

- Location of Solčianky in the Nitra Region Location of Solčianky in Slovakia
- Coordinates: 48.62°N 18.20°E
- Country: Slovakia
- Region: Nitra Region
- District: Topoľčany District
- First mentioned: 1113

Area
  - Total: 2.66 km^{2} (1.03 sq mi)
- Elevation: 194 m (636 ft)

Population (2025)
  - Total: 272
- Time zone: UTC+1 (CET)
  - Summer (DST): UTC+2 (CEST)
- Postal code: 956 38
- Area code: +421 38
- Vehicle registration plate (until 2022): TO
- Website: www.solcianky.sk

Solčianky (Hungarian: Szolcsányka) is a municipality in the Topoľčany District of the Nitra Region, Slovakia. In 2011 it had 269 inhabitants.

== Geography ==
The municipality lies at an altitude of 194 metres (636 ft) and covers an area of 2.66 km^{2} (1.03 sq mi) (2025).

== Population ==
Population statistic (10 years)
| Year | 1995 | 2005 | 2015 | 2025 |
|---|---|---|---|---|
| Count | 296 | 262 | 274 | 272 |
| Difference | | −11.48% | +4.58% | −0.72% |

Population statistic
| Year | 2024 | 2025 |
|---|---|---|
| Count | 271 | 272 |
| Difference | | +0.36% |

It has a population of 272 people (31 December 2025).

=== Ethnicity ===
Census 2021 (1+ %)
| Ethnicity | Number | Fraction |
|---|---|---|
| Slovak | 254 | 97.31% |
| Not found out | 6 | 2.29% |
| Total | 261 | |

In year 2021 was 261 people by ethnicity 254 as Slovak, 6 as Not found out, 2 as Czech, 2 as Other and 1 as Hungarian.

Note on population: The difference values of population numbers in the table "Population statistic" and in the sections "Ethnicity" & "Religion" is caused by the use of various statistical methods.

=== Religion ===
Census 2021 (1+ %)
| Religion | Number | Fraction |
|---|---|---|
| Roman Catholic Church | 225 | 86.21% |
| None | 22 | 8.43% |
| Not found out | 9 | 3.45% |
| Total | 261 | |

In year 2021 was 261 people by religion 225 from Roman Catholic Church, 22 from None, 9 from Not found out, 2 from Christian Congregations in Slovakia, 1 from Eastern Orthodox Church, 1 from Evangelical Church and 1 from Seventh-day Adventist Church.
