= Šalgovce =

Šalgovce Tótsók
- Municipality
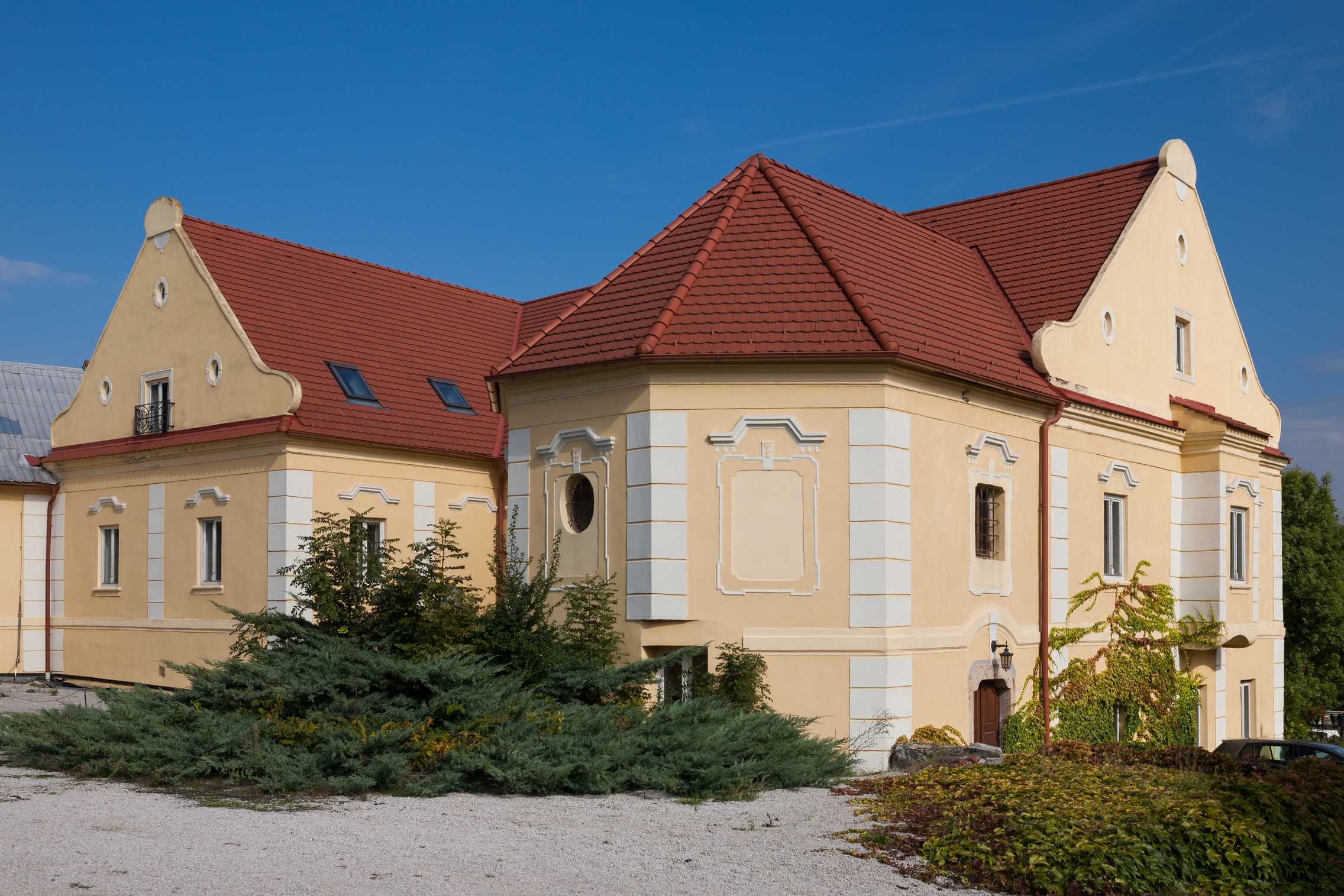

- Flag

- Location of Šalgovce in the Nitra Region Location of Šalgovce in Slovakia
- Coordinates: 48.52°N 17.90°E
- Country: Slovakia
- Region: Nitra Region
- District: Topoľčany District
- First mentioned: 1156

Area
  - Total: 8.98 km^{2} (3.47 sq mi)
- Elevation: 255 m (837 ft)

Population (2025)
  - Total: 453
- Time zone: UTC+1 (CET)
  - Summer (DST): UTC+2 (CEST)
- Postal code: 956 06
- Area code: +421 38
- Vehicle registration plate (until 2022): TO
- Website: salgovce.estranky.sk

Šalgovce (Hungarian: Tótsók) is a municipality in the Topoľčany District of the Nitra Region, Slovakia. In 2011 it had 503 inhabitants.

== Geography ==
The municipality lies at an altitude of 255 metres (837 ft) and covers an area of 8.98 km^{2} (3.47 sq mi) (2025).

== Population ==
Population statistic (10 years)
Year	1995	2005	2015	2025
Count	498	504	512	453
Difference		+1.20%	+1.58%	−11.52%

Population statistic
Year	2024	2025
Count	470	453
Difference		−3.61%

It has a population of 453 people (31 December 2025).

=== Ethnicity ===
Census 2021 (1+ %)
Ethnicity	Number	Fraction
Slovak	501	97.09%
Not found out	11	2.13%
Hungarian	6	1.16%
Total	516	

In year 2021 was 516 people by ethnicity 501 as Slovak, 11 as Not found out, 6 as Hungarian, 4 as Other, 3 as Czech, 1 as Ukrainian and 1 as Russian.

Note on population: The difference values of population numbers in the table "Population statistic" and in the sections "Ethnicity" & "Religion" is caused by the use of various statistical methods.

=== Religion ===
Census 2021 (1+ %)
Religion	Number	Fraction
Roman Catholic Church	365	70.74%
None	112	21.71%
Not found out	11	2.13%
Jehovah's Witnesses	8	1.55%
Paganism and natural spirituality	6	1.16%
Total	516	

In year 2021 was 516 people by religion 365 from Roman Catholic Church, 112 from None, 11 from Not found out, 8 from Jehovah's Witnesses, 6 from Paganism and natural spirituality, 3 from Christian Congregations in Slovakia, 3 from Evangelical Church, 2 from Islam, 2 from Ad hoc movements, 1 from Calvinist Church, 1 from Eastern Orthodox Church, 1 from Other and 1 from Greek Catholic Church.
