= Malé Ripňany =

Municipality in Slovakia

Malé Ripňany Kisrépény
- Municipality
- Flag

- Location of Malé Ripňany in the Nitra Region Location of Malé Ripňany in Slovakia
- Coordinates: 48.48°N 17.98°E
- Country: Slovakia
- Region: Nitra Region
- District: Topoľčany District
- First mentioned: 1390

Area
  - Total: 8.51 km^{2} (3.29 sq mi)
- Elevation: 160 m (520 ft)

Population (2025)
  - Total: 550
- Time zone: UTC+1 (CET)
  - Summer (DST): UTC+2 (CEST)
- Postal code: 956 07
- Area code: +421 38
- Vehicle registration plate (until 2022): TO
- Website: www.maleripnany.sk

Malé Ripňany (Hungarian: Kisrépény) is a municipality in the Topoľčany District of the Nitra Region, Slovakia. In 2011 it had 547 inhabitants.

== Geography ==
The municipality lies at an altitude of 160 metres (520 ft) and covers an area of 8.51 km^{2} (3.29 sq mi) (2025).

== Population ==
Population statistic (10 years)
Year	1995	2005	2015	2025
Count	485	523	555	550
Difference		+7.83%	+6.11%	−0.90%

Population statistic
Year	2024	2025
Count	551	550
Difference		−0.18%

It has a population of 550 people (31 December 2025).

=== Ethnicity ===
Census 2021 (1+ %)
Ethnicity	Number	Fraction
Slovak	529	97.06%
Not found out	19	3.48%
Total	545	

In year 2021 was 545 people by ethnicity 529 as Slovak, 19 as Not found out, 2 as Polish, 1 as Serbian and 1 as Hungarian.

Note on population: The difference values of population numbers in the table "Population statistic" and in the sections "Ethnicity" & "Religion" is caused by the use of various statistical methods.

=== Religion ===
Census 2021 (1+ %)
Religion	Number	Fraction
Roman Catholic Church	459	84.22%
None	50	9.17%
Not found out	15	2.75%
Evangelical Church	11	2.02%
Total	545	

In year 2021 was 545 people by religion 459 from Roman Catholic Church, 50 from None, 15 from Not found out, 11 from Evangelical Church, 2 from Old Catholic Church, 2 from Calvinist Church, 2 from Eastern Orthodox Church, 2 from Christian Congregations in Slovakia, 1 from Jehovah's Witnesses and 1 from Greek Catholic Church.
