= Kamanová =

Municipality in Slovakia

Kamanová Kálmánfalva
- Municipality
- Flag

- Location of Kamanová in the Nitra Region Location of Kamanová in Slovakia
- Coordinates: 48.47°N 18.10°E
- Country: Slovakia
- Region: Nitra Region
- District: Topoľčany District
- First mentioned: 1419

Area
  - Total: 6.41 km^{2} (2.47 sq mi)
- Elevation: 158 m (518 ft)

Population (2025)
  - Total: 601
- Time zone: UTC+1 (CET)
  - Summer (DST): UTC+2 (CEST)
- Postal code: 956 12
- Area code: +421 38
- Vehicle registration plate (until 2022): TO
- Website: www.obeckamanova.sk

Kamanová (Hungarian: Kálmánfalva) is a municipality in the Topoľčany District of the Nitra Region, Slovakia. In 2011 it had 601 inhabitants.

== See also ==
- List of municipalities and towns in Slovakia

== Geography ==
The municipality lies at an altitude of 158 metres (518 ft) and covers an area of 6.41 km^{2} (2.47 sq mi) (2025).

== Population ==
Population statistic (10 years)
Year	1995	2005	2015	2025
Count	561	617	600	601
Difference		+9.98%	−2.75%	+0.16%

Population statistic
Year	2024	2025
Count	596	601
Difference		+0.83%

It has a population of 601 people (31 December 2025).

=== Ethnicity ===
Census 2021 (1+ %)
Ethnicity	Number	Fraction
Slovak	595	98.02%
Not found out	11	1.81%
Total	607	

In year 2021 was 607 people by ethnicity 595 as Slovak, 11 as Not found out, 2 as Czech, 2 as Russian, 2 as Hungarian, 1 as Moravian and 1 as Other.

Note on population: The difference values of population numbers in the table "Population statistic" and in the sections "Ethnicity" & "Religion" is caused by the use of various statistical methods.

=== Religion ===
Census 2021 (1+ %)
Religion	Number	Fraction
Roman Catholic Church	480	79.08%
None	75	12.36%
Evangelical Church	22	3.62%
Not found out	20	3.29%
Total	607	

In year 2021 was 607 people by religion 480 from Roman Catholic Church, 75 from None, 22 from Evangelical Church, 20 from Not found out, 6 from Other and not ascertained christian church, 1 from Christian Congregations in Slovakia, 1 from Greek Catholic Church, 1 from Buddhism and 1 from Ad hoc movements.

== Genealogical resources ==
The records for genealogical research are available at the state archive "Statny Archiv in Nitra, Slovakia"

- Roman Catholic church records (births/marriages/deaths): 1758-1895 (parish B)
- Lutheran church records (births/marriages/deaths): 1708-1895 (parish B)
