= Rajčany =

Rajčany Rajcsány
- Municipality
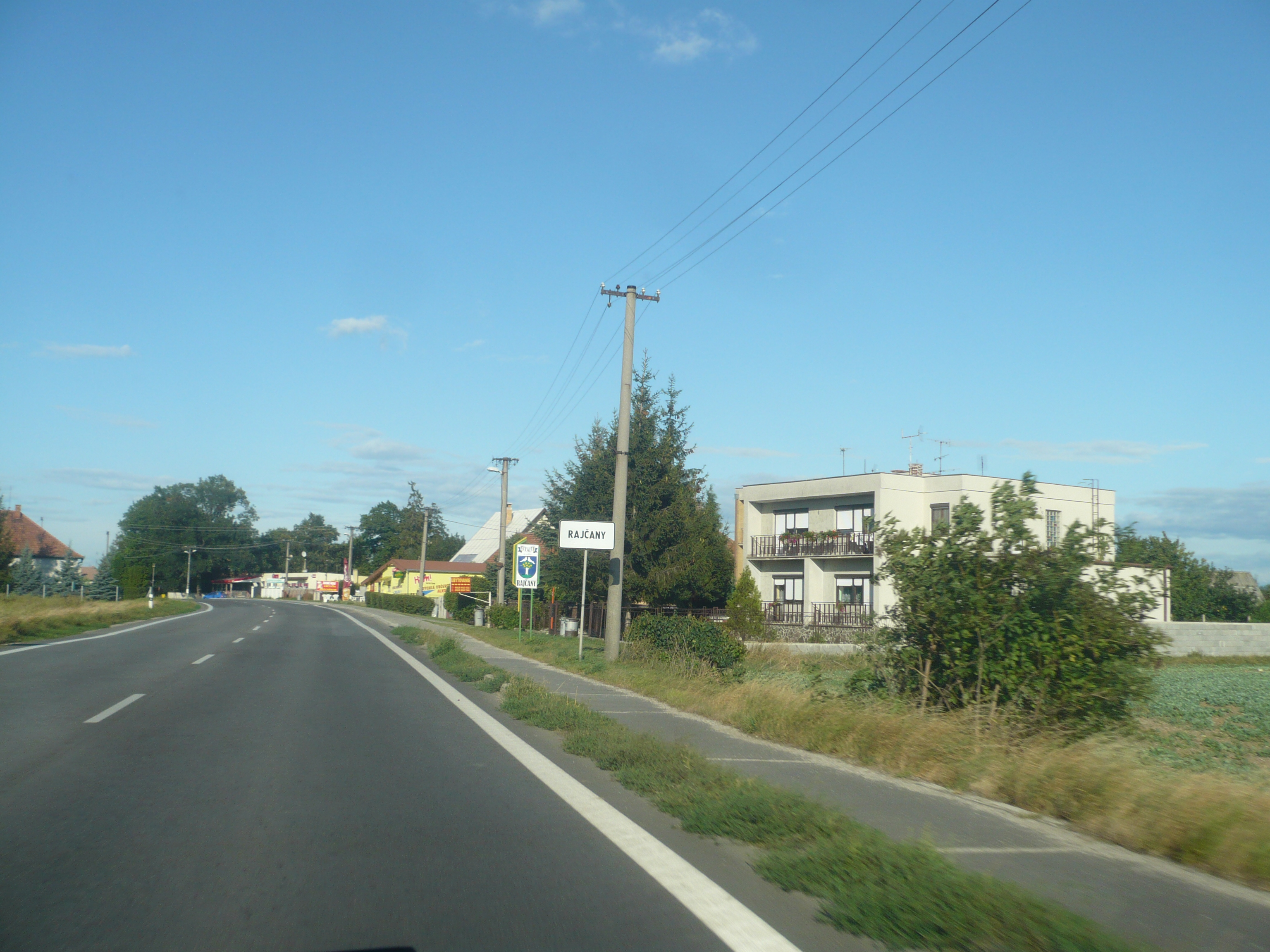

- Flag

- Location of Rajčany in the Nitra Region Location of Rajčany in Slovakia
- Coordinates: 48.61°N 18.67°E
- Country: Slovakia
- Region: Nitra Region
- District: Topoľčany District
- First mentioned: 1244

Area
  - Total: 5.85 km^{2} (2.26 sq mi)
- Elevation: 177 m (581 ft)

Population (2025)
  - Total: 534
- Time zone: UTC+1 (CET)
  - Summer (DST): UTC+2 (CEST)
- Postal code: 956 32
- Area code: +421 38
- Vehicle registration plate (until 2022): TO
- Website: www.rajcany.sk

Rajčany (Hungarian: Rajcsány) is a village and municipality in the Topoľčany District of the Nitra Region, Slovakia. It is unofficially a part of Topoľčany agglomeration. In 2011 the village had 550 inhabitants.

== Geography ==
The municipality lies at an altitude of 177 metres (581 ft) and covers an area of 5.85 km^{2} (2.26 sq mi) (2025).

== Population ==
Population statistic (10 years)
Year	1995	2005	2015	2025
Count	569	558	549	534
Difference		−1.93%	−1.61%	−2.73%

Population statistic
Year	2024	2025
Count	528	534
Difference		+1.13%

It has a population of 534 people (31 December 2025).

=== Ethnicity ===
Census 2021 (1+ %)
Ethnicity	Number	Fraction
Slovak	516	96.44%
Not found out	22	4.11%
Total	535	

In year 2021 was 535 people by ethnicity 516 as Slovak, 22 as Not found out, 3 as Polish, 2 as Czech, 1 as Italian, 1 as Romani and 1 as Hungarian.

Note on population: The difference values of population numbers in the table "Population statistic" and in the sections "Ethnicity" & "Religion" is caused by the use of various statistical methods.

=== Religion ===
Census 2021 (1+ %)
Religion	Number	Fraction
Roman Catholic Church	425	79.44%
None	77	14.39%
Not found out	23	4.3%
Evangelical Church	8	1.5%
Total	535	

In year 2021 was 535 people by religion 425 from Roman Catholic Church, 77 from None, 23 from Not found out, 8 from Evangelical Church, 1 from Other and 1 from Ad hoc movements.
