= Súlovce =

Súlovce Szulóc
- Municipality
- Flag

- Location of Súlovce in the Nitra Region Location of Súlovce in Slovakia
- Coordinates: 48.47°N 18.17°E
- Country: Slovakia
- Region: Nitra Region
- District: Topoľčany District
- First mentioned: 1244

Area
  - Total: 12.64 km^{2} (4.88 sq mi)
- Elevation: 230 m (750 ft)

Population (2025)
  - Total: 546
- Time zone: UTC+1 (CET)
  - Summer (DST): UTC+2 (CEST)
- Postal code: 956 14
- Area code: +421 38
- Vehicle registration plate (until 2022): TO
- Website: www.sulovce.eu

Súlovce (Hungarian: Szulóc) is a municipality in the Topoľčany District of the Nitra Region, Slovakia. In 2016 it had 494 inhabitants.

== Geography ==
The municipality lies at an altitude of 230 metres (750 ft) and covers an area of 12.64 km^{2} (4.88 sq mi) (2025).

== Population ==
Population statistic (10 years)
Year	1995	2005	2015	2025
Count	513	500	488	546
Difference		−2.53%	−2.4%	+11.88%

Population statistic
Year	2024	2025
Count	541	546
Difference		+0.92%

It has a population of 546 people (31 December 2025).

=== Ethnicity ===
Census 2021 (1+ %)
Ethnicity	Number	Fraction
Slovak	530	98.33%
Not found out	13	2.41%
Total	539	

In year 2021 was 539 people by ethnicity 530 as Slovak, 13 as Not found out, 3 as Czech, 1 as Romanian and 1 as Other.

Note on population: The difference values of population numbers in the table "Population statistic" and in the sections "Ethnicity" & "Religion" is caused by the use of various statistical methods.

=== Religion ===
Census 2021 (1+ %)
Religion	Number	Fraction
Roman Catholic Church	434	80.52%
None	76	14.1%
Not found out	8	1.48%
Total	539	

In year 2021 was 539 people by religion 434 from Roman Catholic Church, 76 from None, 8 from Not found out, 5 from Other and not ascertained christian church, 5 from Evangelical Church, 3 from Eastern Orthodox Church, 2 from Old Catholic Church, 2 from Calvinist Church, 2 from Christian Congregations in Slovakia, 1 from Paganism and natural spirituality and 1 from Greek Catholic Church.
