= Preseľany =

Preseľany Nyitrapereszlény
- Municipality
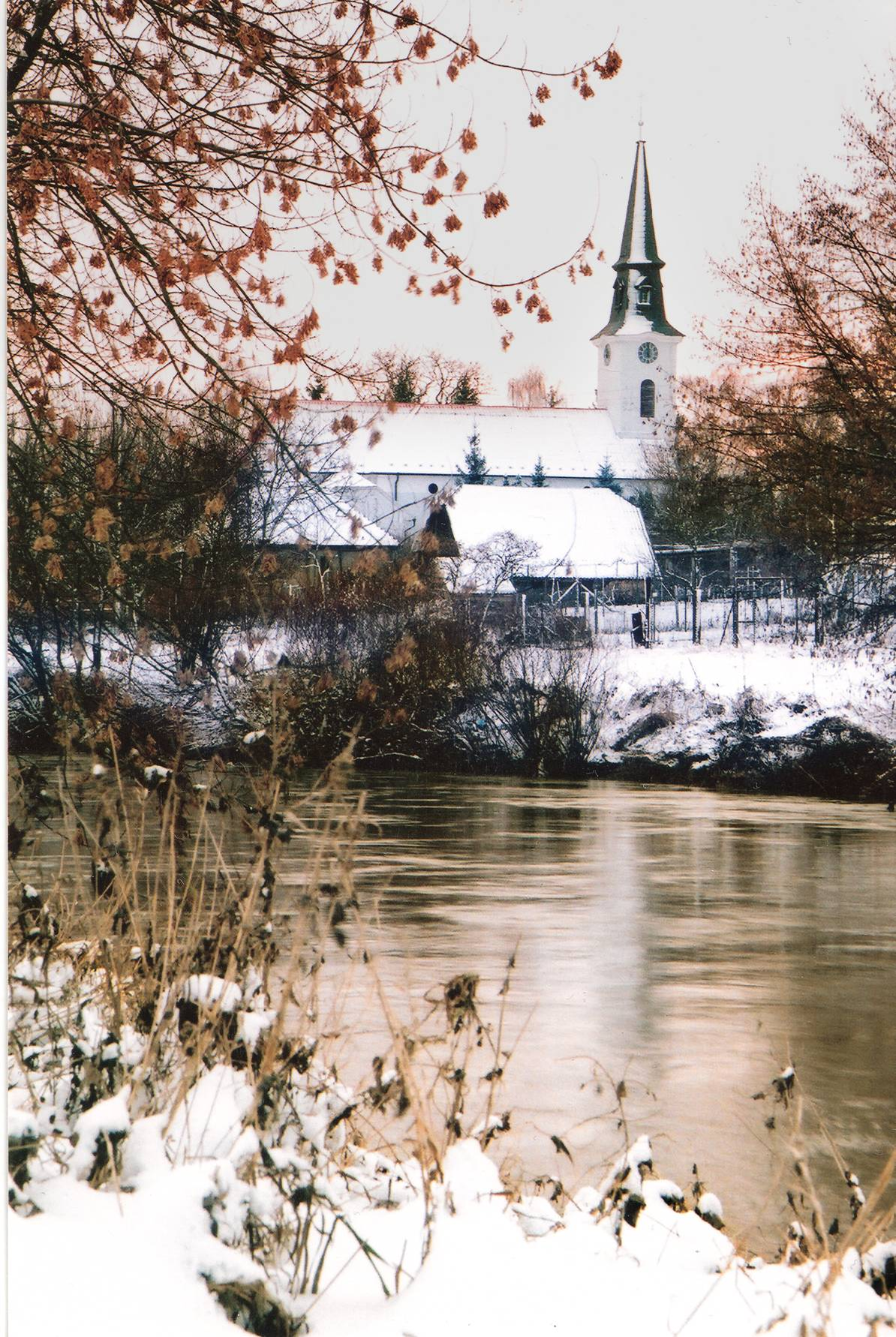

- Flag

- Location of Preseľany in the Nitra Region Location of Preseľany in Slovakia
- Coordinates: 48.45°N 18.08°E
- Country: Slovakia
- Region: Nitra Region
- District: Topoľčany District
- First mentioned: 1280

Government
  - Mayor: Juraj Trsťan

Area
  - Total: 11.90 km^{2} (4.59 sq mi)
- Elevation: 157 m (515 ft)

Population (2025)
  - Total: 1,486
- Time zone: UTC+1 (CET)
  - Summer (DST): UTC+2 (CEST)
- Postal code: 956 12
- Area code: +421 38
- Vehicle registration plate (until 2022): TO
- Website: www.obecpreselany.sk

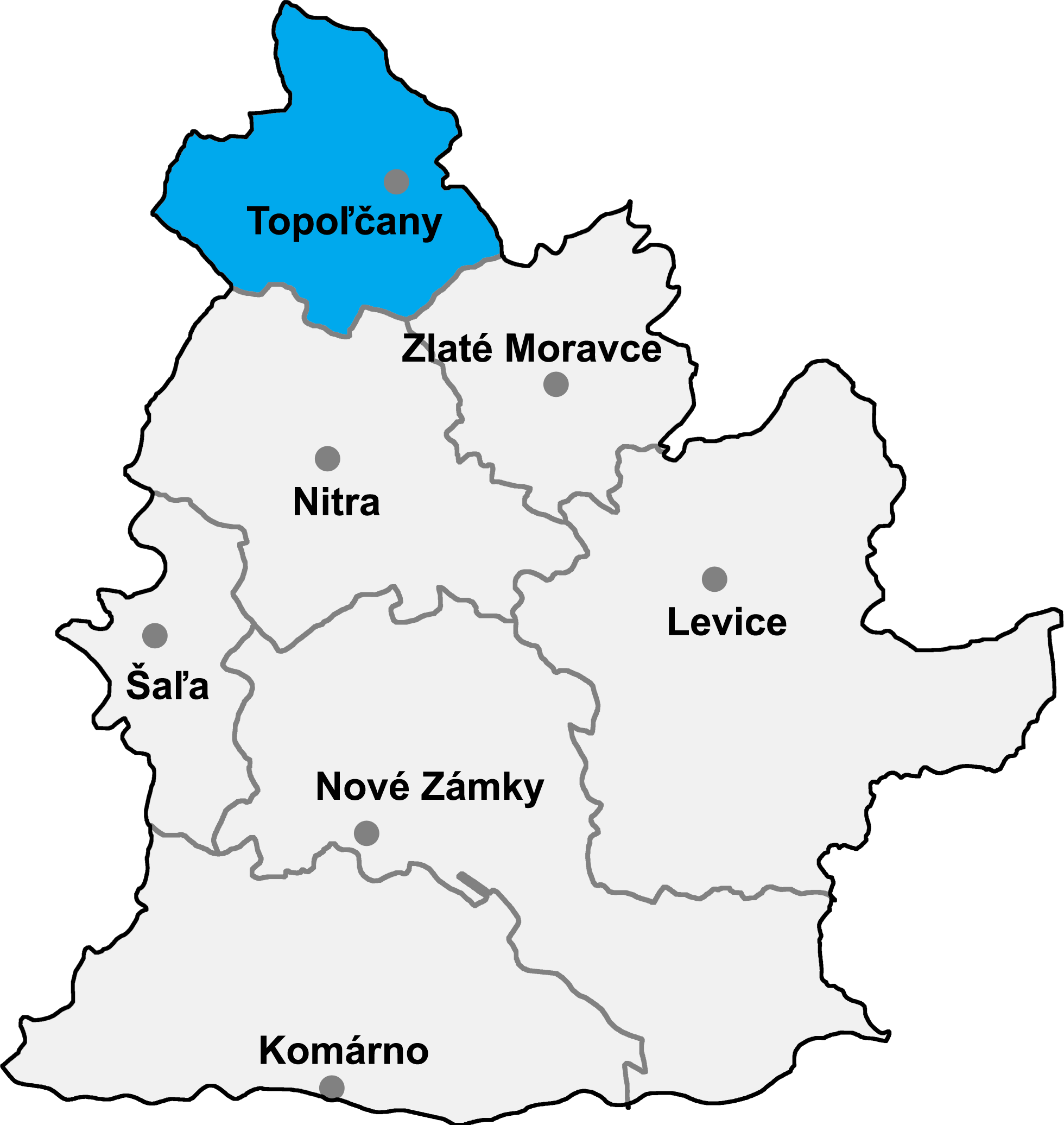
Topoľčany District in Nitra Region

Preseľany (Hungarian: Nyitrapereszlény) is a municipality in the Topoľčany District of the Nitra Region, Slovakia. In Preseľany is football club, skittles club and bodybuilding club.

== Geography ==
The municipality lies at an altitude of 157 metres (515 ft) and covers an area of 11.90 km^{2} (4.59 sq mi) (2025).

== Population ==
Population statistic (10 years)
Year	1995	2005	2015	2025
Count	1453	1484	1473	1486
Difference		+2.13%	−0.74%	+0.88%

Population statistic
Year	2024	2025
Count	1509	1486
Difference		−1.52%

It has a population of 1486 people (31 December 2025).

=== Ethnicity ===
Census 2021 (1+ %)
Ethnicity	Number	Fraction
Slovak	1421	96.07%
Not found out	53	3.58%
Total	1479	

In year 2021 was 1479 people by ethnicity 1421 as Slovak, 53 as Not found out, 8 as Other, 4 as Romanian, 3 as Czech, 3 as Hungarian, 2 as Russian, 1 as Vietnamese, 1 as Rusyn and 1 as English.

Note on population: The difference values of population numbers in the table "Population statistic" and in the sections "Ethnicity" & "Religion" is caused by the use of various statistical methods.

=== Religion ===
Census 2021 (1+ %)
Religion	Number	Fraction
Roman Catholic Church	1190	80.46%
None	186	12.58%
Not found out	57	3.85%
Total	1479	

In year 2021 was 1479 people by religion 1190 from Roman Catholic Church, 186 from None, 57 from Not found out, 12 from Evangelical Church, 11 from Ad hoc movements, 6 from Greek Catholic Church, 5 from Christian Congregations in Slovakia, 4 from Paganism and natural spirituality, 2 from Eastern Orthodox Church, 2 from Other, 2 from Apostolic Church, 1 from Czechoslovak Hussite Church and 1 from Seventh-day Adventist Church.
