= Krtovce =

Municipality in Slovakia

Krtovce Kartolc
- Municipality
- Flag

- Location of Krtovce in the Nitra Region Location of Krtovce in Slovakia
- Coordinates: 48.53°N 18.02°E
- Country: Slovakia
- Region: Nitra Region
- District: Topoľčany District
- First mentioned: 1156

Area
  - Total: 4.20 km^{2} (1.62 sq mi)
- Elevation: 208 m (682 ft)

Population (2025)
  - Total: 293
- Time zone: UTC+1 (CET)
  - Summer (DST): UTC+2 (CEST)
- Postal code: 956 03
- Area code: +421 38
- Vehicle registration plate (until 2022): TO
- Website: www.krtovce.sk

Krtovce (Hungarian: Kartolc) is a municipality in the Topoľčany District of the Nitra Region, Slovakia. As of the 2011 census, it had a population of 303 inhabitants.

OFK Krtovce, the local football team, competes in the sixth tier of the Slovak football league system.

== Geography ==
The municipality lies at an altitude of 208 metres (682 ft) and covers an area of 4.20 km^{2} (1.62 sq mi) (2025).

== Population ==
Population statistic (10 years)
Year	1995	2005	2015	2025
Count	289	313	310	293
Difference		+8.30%	−0.95%	−5.48%

Population statistic
Year	2024	2025
Count	288	293
Difference		+1.73%

It has a population of 293 people (31 December 2025).

=== Ethnicity ===
Census 2021 (1+ %)
Ethnicity	Number	Fraction
Slovak	274	94.48%
Not found out	8	2.75%
Ukrainian	3	1.03%
Total	290	

In year 2021 was 290 people by ethnicity 274 as Slovak, 8 as Not found out, 3 as Ukrainian, 2 as Czech, 2 as Rusyn, 2 as Russian, 1 as Jewish and 1 as Austrian.

Note on population: The difference values of population numbers in the table "Population statistic" and in the sections "Ethnicity" & "Religion" is caused by the use of various statistical methods.

=== Religion ===
Census 2021 (1+ %)
Religion	Number	Fraction
Roman Catholic Church	206	71.03%
None	44	15.17%
Jehovah's Witnesses	10	3.45%
Evangelical Church	9	3.1%
Eastern Orthodox Church	8	2.76%
Not found out	7	2.41%
Total	290	

In year 2021 was 290 people by religion 206 from Roman Catholic Church, 44 from None, 10 from Jehovah's Witnesses, 9 from Evangelical Church, 8 from Eastern Orthodox Church, 7 from Not found out, 2 from Greek Catholic Church, 2 from Ad hoc movements, 1 from Paganism and natural spirituality and 1 from Other.
