= Čermany =

Municipality in Slovakia

Čermany Csermend
- Municipality
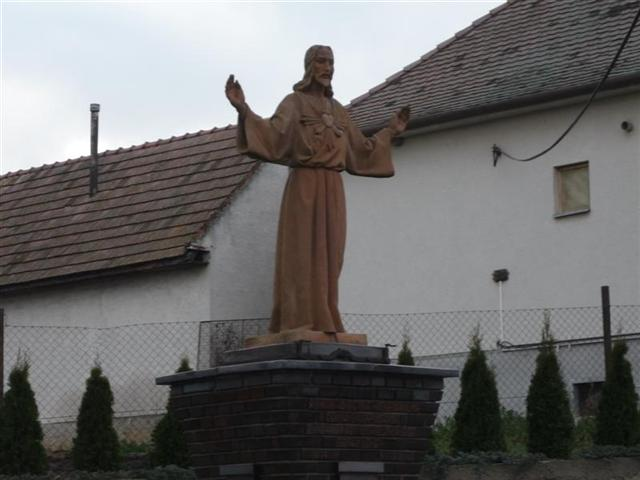

- Flag

- Location of Čermany in the Nitra Region Location of Čermany in Slovakia
- Coordinates: 48.47°N 18.03°E
- Country: Slovakia
- Region: Nitra Region
- District: Topoľčany District
- First mentioned: 1257

Area
  - Total: 10.83 km^{2} (4.18 sq mi)
- Elevation: 179 m (587 ft)

Population (2025)
  - Total: 369
- Time zone: UTC+1 (CET)
  - Summer (DST): UTC+2 (CEST)
- Postal code: 956 08
- Area code: +421 38
- Vehicle registration plate (until 2022): TO
- Website: www.cermany.sk

Čermany (Hungarian: Csermend) is a municipality in the Topoľčany District of the Nitra Region, Slovakia. In 2011 had a population of 383 inhabitants.

== Geography ==
The municipality lies at an altitude of 179 metres (587 ft) and covers an area of 10.83 km^{2} (4.18 sq mi) (2025).

== Population ==
Population statistic (10 years)
Year	1995	2005	2015	2025
Count	400	375	364	369
Difference		−6.25%	−2.93%	+1.37%

Population statistic
Year	2024	2025
Count	366	369
Difference		+0.81%

It has a population of 369 people (31 December 2025).

=== Ethnicity ===
Census 2021 (1+ %)
Ethnicity	Number	Fraction
Slovak	354	97.25%
Not found out	8	2.19%
Total	364	

In year 2021 was 364 people by ethnicity 354 as Slovak, 8 as Not found out, 2 as Czech, 2 as Hungarian, 1 as Ukrainian and 1 as Romani.

Note on population: The difference values of population numbers in the table "Population statistic" and in the sections "Ethnicity" & "Religion" is caused by the use of various statistical methods.

=== Religion ===
Census 2021 (1+ %)
Religion	Number	Fraction
Roman Catholic Church	304	83.52%
None	51	14.01%
Not found out	7	1.92%
Total	364	

In year 2021 was 364 people by religion 304 from Roman Catholic Church, 51 from None, 7 from Not found out and 2 from Other and not ascertained christian church.

== Genealogical resources ==
The records for genealogical research are available at the state archive "Statny Archiv in Nitra, Slovakia"

- Roman Catholic church records (births/marriages/deaths): 1727-1896 (parish A)
- Lutheran church records (births/marriages/deaths): 1708-1895 (parish B)

== See also ==
- List of municipalities and towns in Slovakia
