= Nitrianska Streda =

Nitrianska Streda Nitrianska Streda1.JPG
- Municipality
- Flag

- Location of Nitrianska Streda in the Nitra Region Location of Nitrianska Streda in Slovakia
- Coordinates: 48.52°N 18.18°E
- Country: Slovakia
- Region: Nitra Region
- District: Topoľčany District
- First mentioned: 1278

Area
  - Total: 13.95 km^{2} (5.39 sq mi)
- Elevation: 170 m (560 ft)

Population (2025)
  - Total: 747
- Time zone: UTC+1 (CET)
  - Summer (DST): UTC+2 (CEST)
- Postal code: 956 16
- Area code: +421 38
- Vehicle registration plate (until 2022): TO
- Website: www.nitrianskastreda.sk

Nitrianska Streda (Hungarian: Nyitraszerdahely) is a municipality in the Topoľčany District of the Nitra Region, Slovakia. In 2011 it had 731 inhabitants.

== Geography ==
The municipality lies at an altitude of 170 metres (560 ft) and covers an area of 13.95 km^{2} (5.39 sq mi) (2025).

== Population ==
Population statistic (10 years)
Year	1995	2005	2015	2025
Count	756	769	768	747
Difference		+1.71%	−0.13%	−2.73%

Population statistic
Year	2024	2025
Count	738	747
Difference		+1.21%

It has a population of 747 people (31 December 2025).

=== Ethnicity ===
Census 2021 (1+ %)
Ethnicity	Number	Fraction
Slovak	722	97.17%
Not found out	13	1.74%
Czech	9	1.21%
Total	743	

In year 2021 was 743 people by ethnicity 722 as Slovak, 13 as Not found out, 9 as Czech, 2 as Romanian, 2 as Other, 2 as Croatian, 1 as Italian, 1 as Romani, 1 as Rusyn, 1 as Polish and 1 as Moravian.

Note on population: The difference values of population numbers in the table "Population statistic" and in the sections "Ethnicity" & "Religion" is caused by the use of various statistical methods.

=== Religion ===
Census 2021 (1+ %)
Religion	Number	Fraction
Roman Catholic Church	257	34.59%
None	244	32.84%
Evangelical Church	214	28.8%
Not found out	14	1.88%
Total	743	

In year 2021 was 743 people by religion 257 from Roman Catholic Church, 244 from None, 214 from Evangelical Church, 14 from Not found out, 5 from Greek Catholic Church, 5 from Ad hoc movements, 2 from Christian Congregations in Slovakia, 1 from Islam and 1 from Seventh-day Adventist Church.
