= Blesovce =

Village and municipality in Slovakia

Blesovce Belesz
- Municipality
- Flag

- Location of Blesovce in the Nitra Region Location of Blesovce in Slovakia
- Coordinates: 48.55°N 18.03°E
- Country: Slovakia
- Region: Nitra Region
- District: Topoľčany District
- First mentioned: 1262

Area
  - Total: 5.07 km^{2} (1.96 sq mi)
- Elevation: 233 m (764 ft)

Population (2025)
  - Total: 327
- Time zone: UTC+1 (CET)
  - Summer (DST): UTC+2 (CEST)
- Postal code: 956 01
- Area code: +421 38
- Vehicle registration plate (until 2022): TO
- Website: blesovce.webnode.sk

Blesovce (Hungarian: Belesz) is a village and municipality in the Topoľčany District of the Nitra Region, Slovakia. In 2011, the village had 334 inhabitants.

== Geography ==
The municipality lies at an altitude of 233 metres (764 ft) and covers an area of 5.07 km^{2} (1.96 sq mi) (2025).

== Population ==
Population statistic (10 years)
| Year | 1995 | 2005 | 2015 | 2025 |
|---|---|---|---|---|
| Count | 366 | 396 | 345 | 327 |
| Difference | | +8.19% | −12.87% | −5.21% |

Population statistic
| Year | 2024 | 2025 |
|---|---|---|
| Count | 330 | 327 |
| Difference | | −0.90% |

It has a population of 327 people (31 December 2025).

=== Ethnicity ===
Census 2021 (1+ %)
| Ethnicity | Number | Fraction |
|---|---|---|
| Slovak | 333 | 96.24% |
| Not found out | 8 | 2.31% |
| Total | 346 | |

In year 2021 was 346 people by ethnicity 333 as Slovak, 8 as Not found out, 3 as Hungarian, 2 as Czech, 2 as Ukrainian, 1 as Russian and 1 as Other.

Note on population: The difference values of population numbers in the table "Population statistic" and in the sections "Ethnicity" & "Religion" is caused by the use of various statistical methods.

=== Religion ===
Census 2021 (1+ %)
| Religion | Number | Fraction |
|---|---|---|
| Roman Catholic Church | 264 | 76.3% |
| None | 41 | 11.85% |
| Evangelical Church | 28 | 8.09% |
| Not found out | 10 | 2.89% |
| Total | 346 | |

In year 2021 was 346 people by religion 264 from Roman Catholic Church, 41 from None, 28 from Evangelical Church, 10 from Not found out, 1 from Paganism and natural spirituality, 1 from Other and 1 from Ad hoc movements.

== See also ==
- List of municipalities and towns in Slovakia
