= Horné Chlebany =

Municipality in Slovakia

Horné Chlebany Felsőhelbény
- Municipality
- Flag

- Location of Horné Chlebany in the Nitra Region Location of Horné Chlebany in Slovakia
- Coordinates: 48.60°N 18.23°E
- Country: Slovakia
- Region: Nitra Region
- District: Topoľčany District
- First mentioned: 1328

Area
  - Total: 3.79 km^{2} (1.46 sq mi)
- Elevation: 178 m (584 ft)

Population (2025)
  - Total: 375
- Time zone: UTC+1 (CET)
  - Summer (DST): UTC+2 (CEST)
- Postal code: 956 31
- Area code: +421 38
- Vehicle registration plate (until 2022): TO
- Website: www.hornechlebany.sk

Horné Chlebany (Hungarian: Felsőhelbény) is a municipality in the Topoľčany District of the Nitra Region, Slovakia. In 2011 it had 361 inhabitants.

== See also ==
- List of municipalities and towns in Slovakia

== Geography ==
The municipality lies at an altitude of 178 metres (584 ft) and covers an area of 3.79 km^{2} (1.46 sq mi) (2025).

== Population ==
Population statistic (10 years)
Year	1995	2005	2015	2025
Count	369	343	360	375
Difference		−7.04%	+4.95%	+4.16%

Population statistic
Year	2024	2025
Count	370	375
Difference		+1.35%

It has a population of 375 people (31 December 2025).

=== Ethnicity ===
Census 2021 (1+ %)
Ethnicity	Number	Fraction
Slovak	355	98.88%
Total	359	

In year 2021 was 359 people by ethnicity 355 as Slovak, 3 as Not found out, 2 as Ukrainian, 2 as Italian, 1 as Austrian and 1 as Croatian.

Note on population: The difference values of population numbers in the table "Population statistic" and in the sections "Ethnicity" & "Religion" is caused by the use of various statistical methods.

=== Religion ===
Census 2021 (1+ %)
Religion	Number	Fraction
Roman Catholic Church	320	89.14%
None	21	5.85%
Not found out	7	1.95%
Greek Catholic Church	4	1.11%
Total	359	

In year 2021 was 359 people by religion 320 from Roman Catholic Church, 21 from None, 7 from Not found out, 4 from Greek Catholic Church, 2 from Ad hoc movements, 1 from Calvinist Church, 1 from Eastern Orthodox Church, 1 from Christian Congregations in Slovakia, 1 from Other and 1 from Evangelical Church.

== Genealogical resources ==
The records for genealogical research are available at the state archive "Statny Archiv in Nitra, Slovakia"

- Roman Catholic church records (births/marriages/deaths): 1813-1898 (parish B)
