= Chrabrany =

Municipality in Slovakia

Chrabrany Nyitragaráb
- Municipality
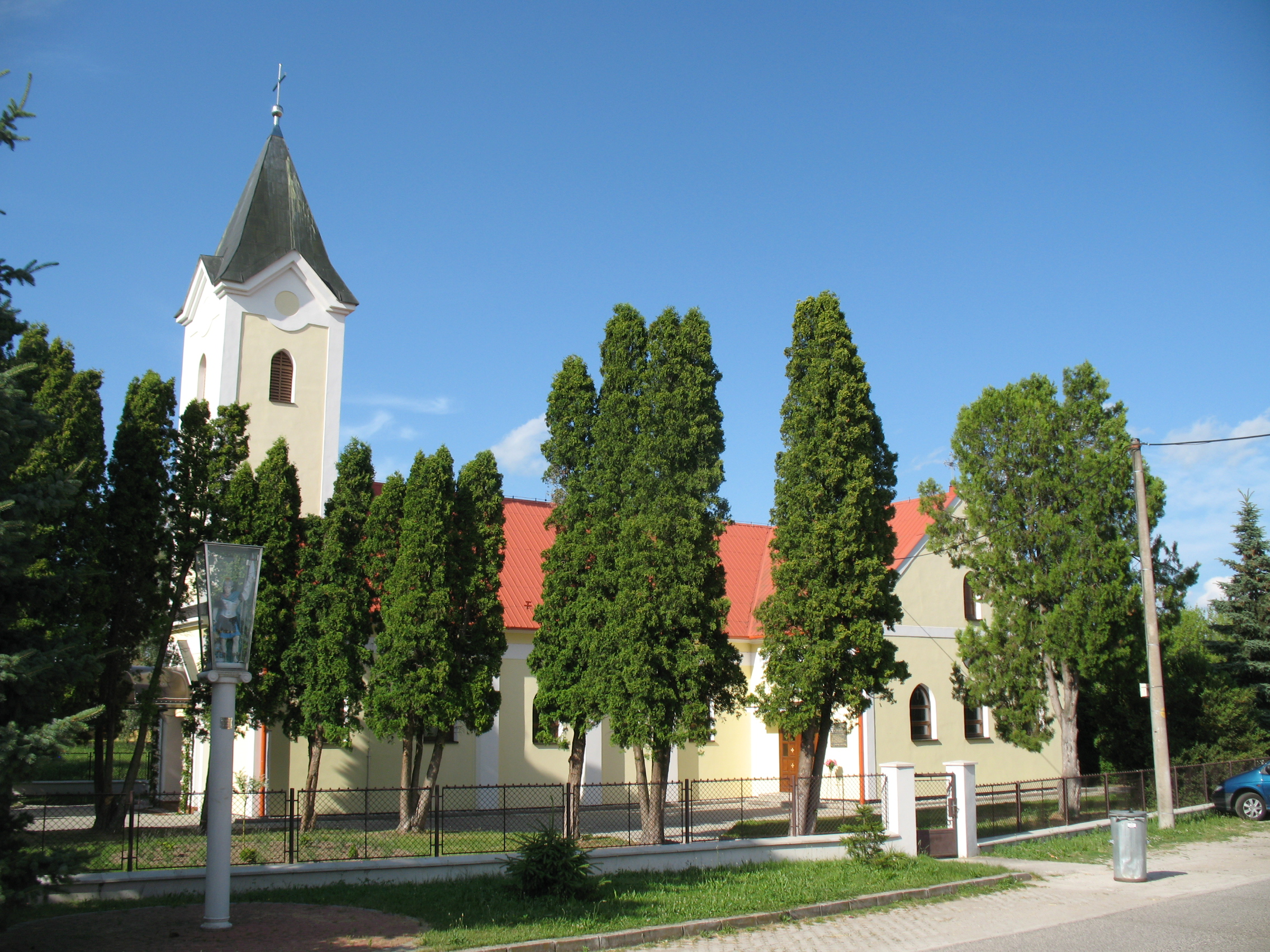

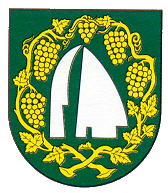
- Flag Coat of arms

- Location of Chrabrany in the Nitra Region Location of Chrabrany in Slovakia
- Coordinates: 48.53°N 18.15°E
- Country: Slovakia
- Region: Nitra Region
- District: Topoľčany District
- First mentioned: 1291

Area
  - Total: 7.95 km^{2} (3.07 sq mi)
- Elevation: 159 m (522 ft)

Population (2025)
  - Total: 941
- Time zone: UTC+1 (CET)
  - Summer (DST): UTC+2 (CEST)
- Postal code: 955 01
- Area code: +421 38
- Vehicle registration plate (until 2022): TO
- Website: www.obecchrabrany.sk

Chrabrany (Slovak pronunciation: ['xrabranɪ]; Hungarian: Nyitragaráb) is a municipality in the Topoľčany District of the Nitra Region, Slovakia. In 2011 it had 763 inhabitants. The village Chrabrany forms a core of municipality. It is situated on the right bank of the Nitra river, three kilometres south of Topolcany.

A settlement has existed on the area of the village since the Prehistoric era and later in the times of Great Moravia; however the first mention of the municipality in written texts dates from 1291. In this period the village was a part of county of Chrabor family, in 1687 of the Hungarian noble family Erdődy (also Erdödy, Erdődi).

== Geography ==
The municipality lies at an altitude of 159 metres (522 ft) and covers an area of 7.95 km^{2} (3.07 sq mi) (2025).

== Etymology ==
Chrabrany is derived from " chrabor, -a, -o, hist. chrabr, adj." meaning "courageous, brave, lionhearted“ (chrabrъ from chorbrь, Slovak: chrabrý, Slovenian: hraber, Serbian, Croatian: hrabar, Czech: chrabrý, Polish: chrobry, Ukrainian: chorobryj etc.); The name probably referred to residents of the village, brave and fearless by defending their rights, property, land or their kind-hearted feudal lord. Original name: in 1291—Hrabor, Chrabor—1773, Chrabrany—1808. The residents probably served their lord as his guards.

== Population ==
Population statistic (10 years)
Year	1995	2005	2015	2025
Count	791	768	743	941
Difference		−2.90%	−3.25%	+26.64%

Population statistic
Year	2024	2025
Count	932	941
Difference		+0.96%

It has a population of 941 people (31 December 2025).

=== Ethnicity ===
Census 2021 (1+ %)
Ethnicity	Number	Fraction
Slovak	811	95.41%
Not found out	20	2.35%
Romanian	17	2%
Czech	11	1.29%
Total	850	

In year 2021 was 850 people by ethnicity 811 as Slovak, 20 as Not found out, 17 as Romanian, 11 as Czech, 2 as Ukrainian and 1 as Polish.

Note on population: The difference values of population numbers in the table "Population statistic" and in the sections "Ethnicity" & "Religion" is caused by the use of various statistical methods.

=== Religion ===
Census 2021 (1+ %)
Religion	Number	Fraction
Roman Catholic Church	704	82.82%
None	85	10%
Not found out	20	2.35%
Greek Catholic Church	16	1.88%
Evangelical Church	15	1.76%
Total	850	

In year 2021 was 850 people by religion 704 from Roman Catholic Church, 85 from None, 20 from Not found out, 16 from Greek Catholic Church, 15 from Evangelical Church, 4 from Paganism and natural spirituality, 2 from Jehovah's Witnesses, 2 from Apostolic Church, 1 from Other and not ascertained christian church and 1 from Other.

== Belanov kút ==
On the right bank of Nitra river is located a protected natural phenomenon Belanov kút, which spreads over cadastral units of municipalities Chrabrany, Čeladince and Kovarce on the total area of 2.27 ha. Belanov kút is a picturesque oxbow lake surrounded by different kinds of typical Slovak trees such as willows, poplars, acacias, maples, alder trees and shrubwood (elderberry, buckthorn, etc.) and provides shelter for many protected animals and hydrophilic plants.

== See also ==
- List of municipalities and towns in Slovakia

== Genealogical resources ==
The records for genealogical research are available at the state archive "Statny Archiv in Nitra, Slovakia"

- Roman Catholic church records (births/marriages/deaths): 1758-1895 (parish B)
