= Ardanovce =

Village and municipality in Slovakia

Ardanovce Árdánfalva
- Municipality
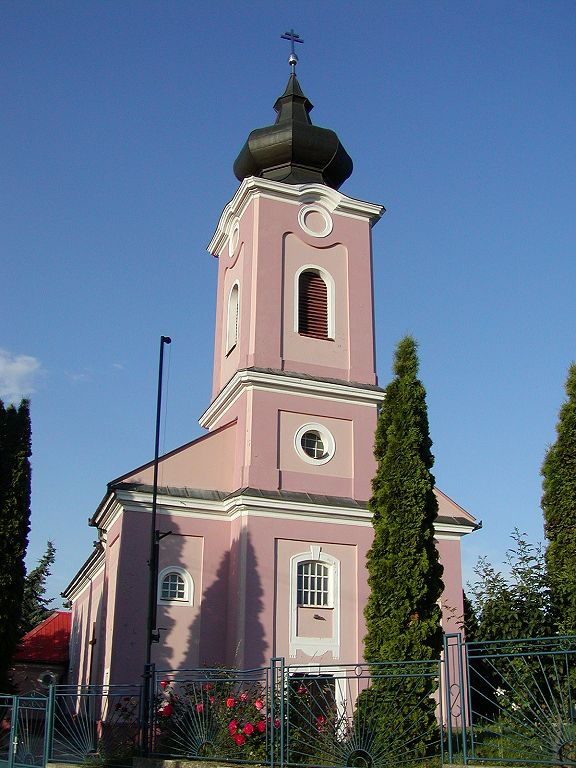
- Church sv. Michala Archanjela

- Flag

- Location of Ardanovce in the Nitra Region Location of Ardanovce in Slovakia
- Coordinates: 48.53°N 17.90°E
- Country: Slovakia
- Region: Nitra Region
- District: Topoľčany District
- First mentioned: 1317

Area
  - Total: 6.73 km^{2} (2.60 sq mi)
- Elevation: 237 m (778 ft)

Population (2025)
  - Total: 230
- Time zone: UTC+1 (CET)
  - Summer (DST): UTC+2 (CEST)
- Postal code: 956 06
- Area code: +421 38
- Vehicle registration plate (until 2022): TO
- Website: www.ardanovce.sk

Ardanovce (Hungarian: Árdánfalva) is a village and municipality with 239 inhabitants in the Topoľčany District of the Nitra Region, Slovakia. In 2011, the village had 223 inhabitants.

== Geography ==
The municipality lies at an altitude of 237 metres (778 ft) and covers an area of 6.73 km^{2} (2.60 sq mi) (2025).

== Population ==
Population statistic (10 years)
Year	1995	2005	2015	2025
Count	225	228	212	230
Difference		+1.33%	−7.01%	+8.49%

Population statistic
Year	2024	2025
Count	233	230
Difference		−1.28%

It has a population of 230 people (31 December 2025).

=== Ethnicity ===
Census 2021 (1+%)
Ethnicity	Number	Fraction
Slovak	198	97.05%
Not found out	5	2.45%
Total	204	

In year 2021 was 204 people by ethnicity 198 as Slovak, 5 as Not found out, 2 as Other and 1 as Czech.

Note on population: The difference values of population numbers in the table "Population statistic" and in the sections "Ethnicity" & "Religion" is caused by the use of various statistical methods.

=== Religion ===
Census 2021 (1+%)
Religion	Number	Fraction
Roman Catholic Church	162	79.41%
None	23	11.27%
Jehovah's Witnesses	6	2.94%
Christian Congregations in Slovakia	4	1.96%
Evangelical Church	3	1.47%
Total	204	

In year 2021 was 204 people by religion 162 from Roman Catholic Church, 23 from None, 6 from Jehovah's Witnesses, 4 from Christian Congregations in Slovakia, 3 from Evangelical Church, 2 from Not found out, 1 from Calvinist Church, 1 from Eastern Orthodox Church, 1 from Other and 1 from Ad hoc movements.

== Genealogical resources ==
The records for genealogical research are available at the state archive in Nitra (Slovak: Štátny archív v Nitre).

- Roman Catholic church records (births/marriages/deaths): 1822–1895 (parish A)
- Census records 1869 of Ardanovce are available at the state archive.

== See also ==
- List of municipalities and towns in Slovakia
