= Horné Štitáre =

Municipality in Slovakia

Horné Štitáre Felsőcsitár
- Municipality
- Flag

- Location of Horné Štitáre in the Nitra Region Location of Horné Štitáre in Slovakia
- Coordinates: 48.53°N 18.05°E
- Country: Slovakia
- Region: Nitra Region
- District: Topoľčany District
- First mentioned: 1113

Area
  - Total: 5.68 km^{2} (2.19 sq mi)
- Elevation: 199 m (653 ft)

Population (2025)
  - Total: 651
- Time zone: UTC+1 (CET)
  - Summer (DST): UTC+2 (CEST)
- Postal code: 956 03
- Area code: +421 38
- Vehicle registration plate (until 2022): TO
- Website: www.hornestitare.sk

Horné Štitáre (Hungarian: Felsőcsitár) is a municipality in the Topoľčany District of the Nitra Region, Slovakia. In 2011 it had 491 inhabitants.

== Geography ==
The municipality lies at an altitude of 199 metres (653 ft) and covers an area of 5.68 km^{2} (2.19 sq mi) (2025).

== Population ==
Population statistic (10 years)
Year	1995	2005	2015	2025
Count	450	447	523	651
Difference		−0.66%	+17.00%	+24.47%

Population statistic
Year	2024	2025
Count	654	651
Difference		−0.45%

It has a population of 651 people (31 December 2025).

=== Ethnicity ===
Census 2021 (1+%)
Ethnicity	Number	Fraction
Slovak	578	95.22%
Not found out	28	4.61%
Total	607	

In year 2021 was 607 people by ethnicity 578 as Slovak, 28 as Not found out, 5 as Other, 3 as Czech, 2 as Romanian, 2 as Polish, 1 as Ukrainian, 1 as Romani, 1 as German and 1 as Hungarian.

Note on population: The difference values of population numbers in the table "Population statistic" and in the sections "Ethnicity" & "Religion" is caused by the use of various statistical methods.

=== Religion ===
Census 2021 (1+%)
Religion	Number	Fraction
Roman Catholic Church	468	77.1%
None	90	14.83%
Not found out	21	3.46%
Evangelical Church	16	2.64%
Total	607	

In year 2021 was 607 people by religion 468 from Roman Catholic Church, 90 from None, 21 from Not found out, 16 from Evangelical Church, 3 from Eastern Orthodox Church, 2 from Jehovah's Witnesses, 2 from Christian Congregations in Slovakia, 1 from Calvinist Church, 1 from Other and not ascertained christian church, 1 from Other, 1 from Greek Catholic Church and 1 from Ad hoc movements.

== Genealogical resources ==
The records for genealogical research are available at the state archive "Statny Archiv in Nitra, Slovakia".

- Roman Catholic church records (births/marriages/deaths): 1706–1910 (parish B)

== See also ==
- List of municipalities and towns in Slovakia
