= Koniarovce =

Municipality in Slovakia

Koniarovce Szomorlovászi
- Municipality
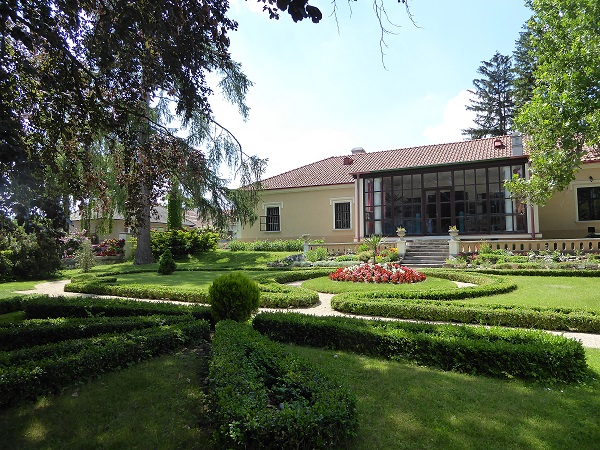

- Flag

- Location of Koniarovce in the Nitra Region Location of Koniarovce in Slovakia
- Coordinates: 48.43°N 18.10°E
- Country: Slovakia
- Region: Nitra Region
- District: Topoľčany District
- First mentioned: 1264

Area
  - Total: 3.60 km^{2} (1.39 sq mi)
- Elevation: 156 m (512 ft)

Population (2025)
  - Total: 663
- Time zone: UTC+1 (CET)
  - Summer (DST): UTC+2 (CEST)
- Postal code: 956 13
- Area code: +421 38
- Vehicle registration plate (until 2022): TO
- Website: www.obeckoniarovce.sk

Koniarovce (Hungarian: Szomorlovászi) is a municipality in the Topoľčany District of the Nitra Region, Slovakia. In 2011 it had 623 inhabitants.

== See also ==
- List of municipalities and towns in Slovakia

== Geography ==
The municipality lies at an altitude of 156 metres (512 ft) and covers an area of 3.60 km^{2} (1.39 sq mi) (2025).

== Population ==
Population statistic (10 years)
Year	1995	2005	2015	2025
Count	612	625	649	663
Difference		+2.12%	+3.84%	+2.15%

Population statistic
Year	2024	2025
Count	661	663
Difference		+0.30%

It has a population of 663 people (31 December 2025).

=== Ethnicity ===
Census 2021 (1+ %)
Ethnicity	Number	Fraction
Slovak	630	97.37%
Not found out	16	2.47%
Total	647	

In year 2021 was 647 people by ethnicity 630 as Slovak, 16 as Not found out, 2 as Hungarian, 1 as Ukrainian, 1 as Italian, 1 as Romani, 1 as Rusyn, 1 as Romanian and 1 as Other.

Note on population: The difference values of population numbers in the table "Population statistic" and in the sections "Ethnicity" & "Religion" is caused by the use of various statistical methods.

=== Religion ===
Census 2021 (1+ %)
Religion	Number	Fraction
Roman Catholic Church	533	82.38%
None	80	12.36%
Not found out	16	2.47%
Total	647	

In year 2021 was 647 people by religion 533 from Roman Catholic Church, 80 from None, 16 from Not found out, 5 from Other, 4 from Christian Congregations in Slovakia, 4 from Evangelical Church, 2 from Greek Catholic Church, 2 from Ad hoc movements and 1 from Other and not ascertained christian church.

== Genealogical resources ==
The records for genealogical research are available at the state archive "Statny Archiv in Nitra, Slovakia"

- Roman Catholic church records (births/marriages/deaths): 1696-1896 (parish B)
