= Horné Obdokovce =

Horné Obdokovce Felsőbodok
- Municipality
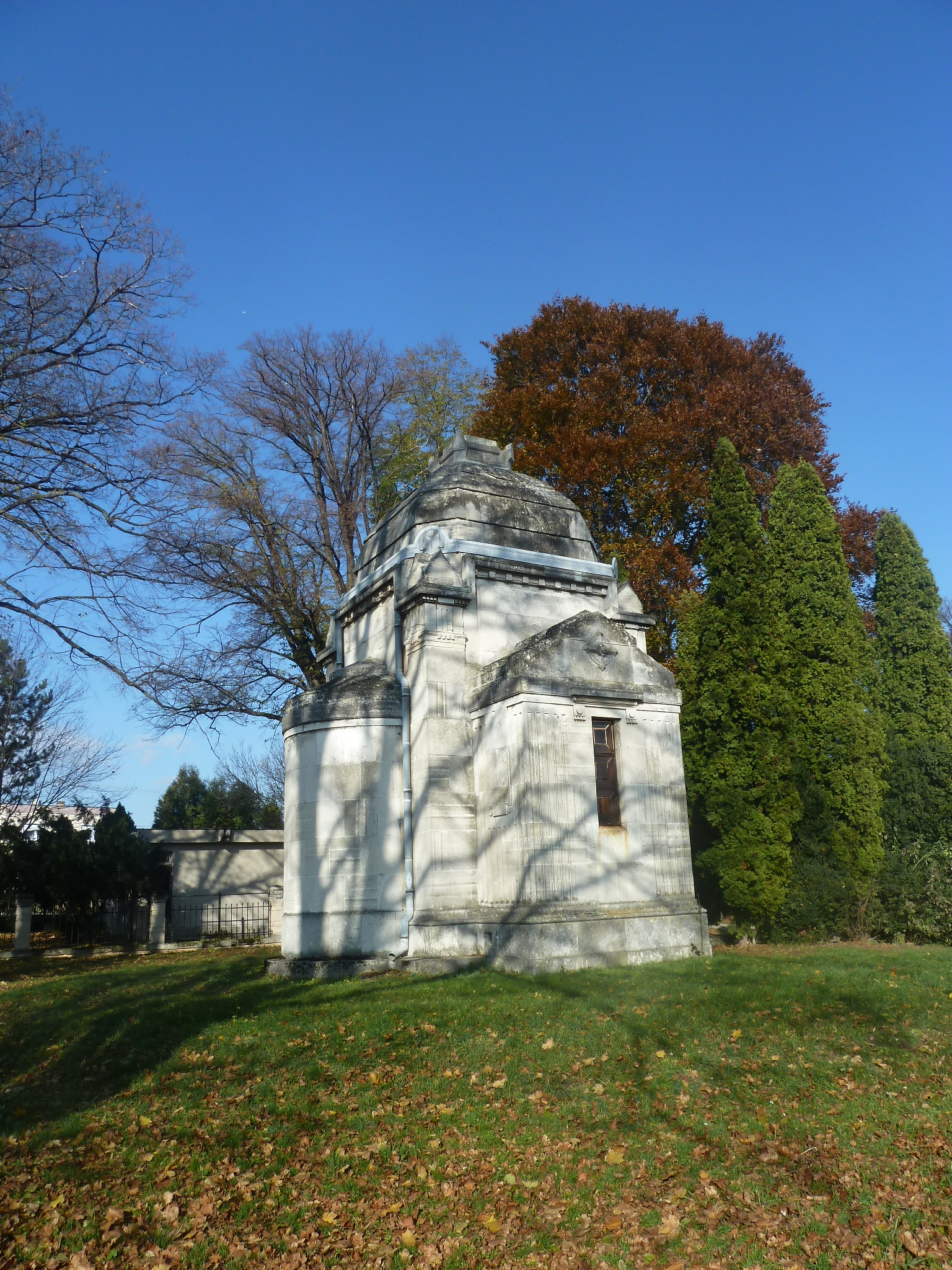

- Flag

- Location of Horné Obdokovce in the Nitra Region Location of Horné Obdokovce in Slovakia
- Coordinates: 48.49°N 18.04°E
- Country: Slovakia
- Region: Nitra Region
- District: Topoľčany District
- First mentioned: 1283

Area
  - Total: 22.89 km^{2} (8.84 sq mi)
- Elevation: 181 m (594 ft)

Population (2025)
  - Total: 1,461
- Time zone: UTC+1 (CET)
  - Summer (DST): UTC+2 (CEST)
- Postal code: 956 08
- Area code: +421 38
- Vehicle registration plate (until 2022): TO
- Website: www.hobdokovce.sk

Horné Obdokovce (Hungarian: Felsőbodok) is a municipality in the Topoľčany District of the Nitra Region, Slovakia. The municipality consists of three parts (settlements): Obsolovce, Bodok, and Dolina. In 2011, it had 1,556 inhabitants.

== Geography ==
The municipality lies at an altitude of 181 metres (594 ft) and covers an area of 22.89 km^{2} (8.84 sq mi) (2025).

== Population ==
Population statistic (10 years)
Year	1995	2005	2015	2025
Count	1640	1640	1523	1461
Difference		+1.42%	−7.13%	−4.07%

Population statistic
Year	2024	2025
Count	1452	1461
Difference		+0.61%

It has a population of 1461 people (31 December 2025).

=== Ethnicity ===
Census 2021 (1+%)
Ethnicity	Number	Fraction
Slovak	1433	96.17%
Not found out	48	3.22%
Total	1490	

In year 2021 was 1490 people by ethnicity 1433 as Slovak, 48 as Not found out, 7 as Czech, 4 as Canadian, 3 as Hungarian, 3 as Albanian, 2 as Russian, 1 as Romani, 1 as German, 1 as Other and 1 as English.

Note on population: The difference values of population numbers in the table "Population statistic" and in the sections "Ethnicity" & "Religion" is caused by the use of various statistical methods.

=== Religion ===
Census 2021 (1+%)
Religion	Number	Fraction
Roman Catholic Church	1213	81.41%
None	172	11.54%
Not found out	58	3.89%
Total	1490	

In year 2021 was 1490 people by religion 1213 from Roman Catholic Church, 172 from None, 58 from Not found out, 10 from Greek Catholic Church, 7 from Old Catholic Church, 5 from Christian Congregations in Slovakia, 4 from Other, 4 from Evangelical Church, 4 from Ad hoc movements, 3 from Calvinist Church, 3 from Islam, 3 from Apostolic Church, 2 from Eastern Orthodox Church, 1 from Other and not ascertained christian church and 1 from Buddhism.

== Genealogical resources ==
The records for genealogical research are available at the state archive "Statny Archiv in Nitra, Slovakia".

- Roman Catholic church records (births/marriages/deaths): 1727–1896 (parish B)

== See also ==
- List of municipalities and towns in Slovakia
