= Veľké Dvorany =

Municipality in Slovakia

Veľké Dvorany Nagyudvar
- Municipality
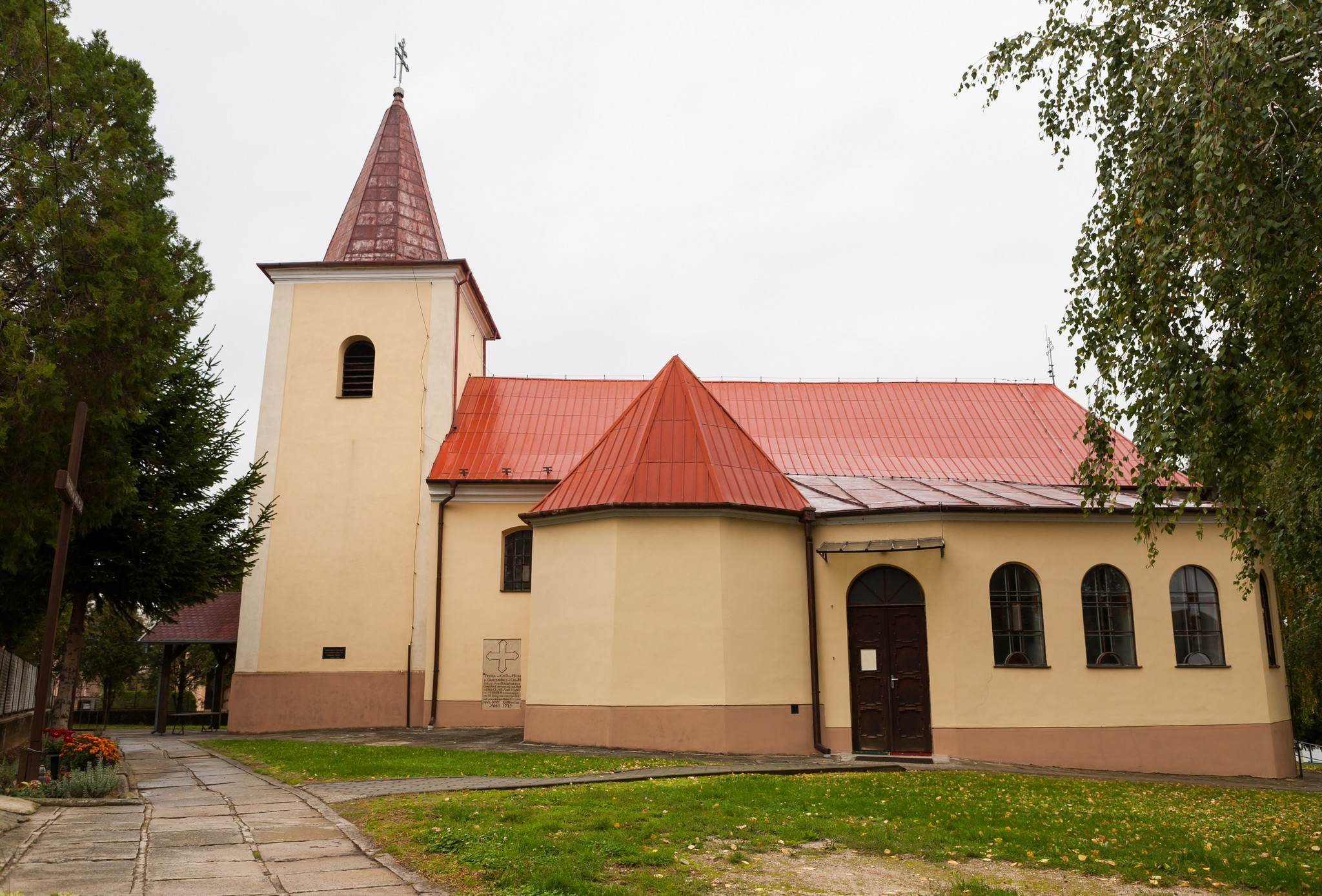
- Church of the nativity of the Virgin Mary

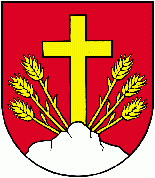
- Flag Coat of arms

- Location of Veľké Dvorany in the Nitra Region Location of Veľké Dvorany in Slovakia
- Coordinates: 48.55°N 18.07°E
- Country: Slovakia
- Region: Nitra Region
- District: Topoľčany District
- First mentioned: 1156

Area
  - Total: 7.74 km^{2} (2.99 sq mi)
- Elevation: 195 m (640 ft)

Population (2025)
  - Total: 754
- Time zone: UTC+1 (CET)
  - Summer (DST): UTC+2 (CEST)
- Postal code: 956 01
- Area code: +421 38
- Vehicle registration plate (until 2022): TO
- Website: www.velkedvorany.sk

Veľké Dvorany (Hungarian: Nagyudvar) is a municipality in the Topoľčany District of the Nitra Region, Slovakia. In 2011 it had 696 inhabitants.

== Geography ==
The municipality lies at an altitude of 195 metres (640 ft) and covers an area of 7.74 km^{2} (2.99 sq mi) (2025).

== Population ==
Population statistic (10 years)
| Year | 1995 | 2005 | 2015 | 2025 |
|---|---|---|---|---|
| Count | 622 | 688 | 708 | 754 |
| Difference | | +10.61% | +2.90% | +6.49% |

Population statistic
| Year | 2024 | 2025 |
|---|---|---|
| Count | 748 | 754 |
| Difference | | +0.80% |

It has a population of 754 people (31 December 2025).

=== Ethnicity ===
Census 2021 (1+ %)
| Ethnicity | Number | Fraction |
|---|---|---|
| Slovak | 716 | 95.72% |
| Not found out | 33 | 4.41% |
| Total | 748 | |

In year 2021 was 748 people by ethnicity 716 as Slovak, 33 as Not found out, 2 as Czech, 1 as Romanian, 1 as Austrian, 1 as Polish and 1 as German.

Note on population: The difference values of population numbers in the table "Population statistic" and in the sections "Ethnicity" & "Religion" is caused by the use of various statistical methods.

=== Religion ===
Census 2021 (1+ %)
| Religion | Number | Fraction |
|---|---|---|
| Roman Catholic Church | 614 | 82.09% |
| None | 84 | 11.23% |
| Not found out | 30 | 4.01% |
| Total | 748 | |

In year 2021 was 748 people by religion 614 from Roman Catholic Church, 84 from None, 30 from Not found out, 4 from Calvinist Church, 4 from Evangelical Church, 2 from Eastern Orthodox Church, 2 from Other, 2 from Ad hoc movements, 1 from Jewish community, 1 from Paganism and natural spirituality, 1 from Christian Congregations in Slovakia, 1 from Islam, 1 from Hinduism and 1 from Buddhism.
