= Vozokany, Topoľčany District =

Vozokany Végvezekény
- Municipality
- Flag

- Location of Vozokany district Topoľčany in the Nitra Region Location of Vozokany district Topoľčany in Slovakia
- Country: Slovakia
- Region: Nitra Region
- District: Topoľčany District
- First mentioned: 1318

Area
  - Total: 9.11 km^{2} (3.52 sq mi)
- Elevation: 239 m (784 ft)

Population (2025)
  - Total: 325
- Time zone: UTC+1 (CET)
  - Summer (DST): UTC+2 (CEST)
- Postal code: 956 04
- Area code: +421 38
- Vehicle registration plate (until 2022): TO
- Website: obecvozokany.sk

Vozokany (Hungarian: Végvezekény) is a village and municipality with 324 inhabitants in the Topoľčany District of the Nitra Region, Slovakia. In 2011 the village had 328 inhabitants.

== Population ==
Population statistic (10 years)
Year	1995	2005	2015	2025
Count	293	324	341	325
Difference		+10.58%	+5.24%	−4.69%

Population statistic
Year	2024	2025
Count	333	325
Difference		−2.40%

It has a population of 325 people (31 December 2025).

=== Ethnicity ===
Census 2021 (1+ %)
Ethnicity	Number	Fraction
Slovak	345	98.29%
Not found out	9	2.56%
Total	351	

In year 2021 was 351 people by ethnicity 345 as Slovak, 9 as Not found out, 2 as Russian, 2 as Romanian, 2 as Other, 1 as Ukrainian and 1 as Polish.

Note on population: The difference values of population numbers in the table "Population statistic" and in the sections "Ethnicity" & "Religion" is caused by the use of various statistical methods.

=== Religion ===
Census 2021 (1+ %)
Religion	Number	Fraction
Roman Catholic Church	276	78.63%
None	57	16.24%
Not found out	4	1.14%
Evangelical Church	4	1.14%
Total	351	

In year 2021 was 351 people by religion 276 from Roman Catholic Church, 57 from None, 4 from Not found out, 4 from Evangelical Church, 3 from Eastern Orthodox Church, 2 from Christian Congregations in Slovakia, 2 from Greek Catholic Church, 1 from Calvinist Church, 1 from Paganism and natural spirituality and 1 from Buddhism.
