= Kuzmice, Topoľčany District =

Municipality in Slovakia

Kuzmice district Topoľčany Nyitrakozma
- Municipality
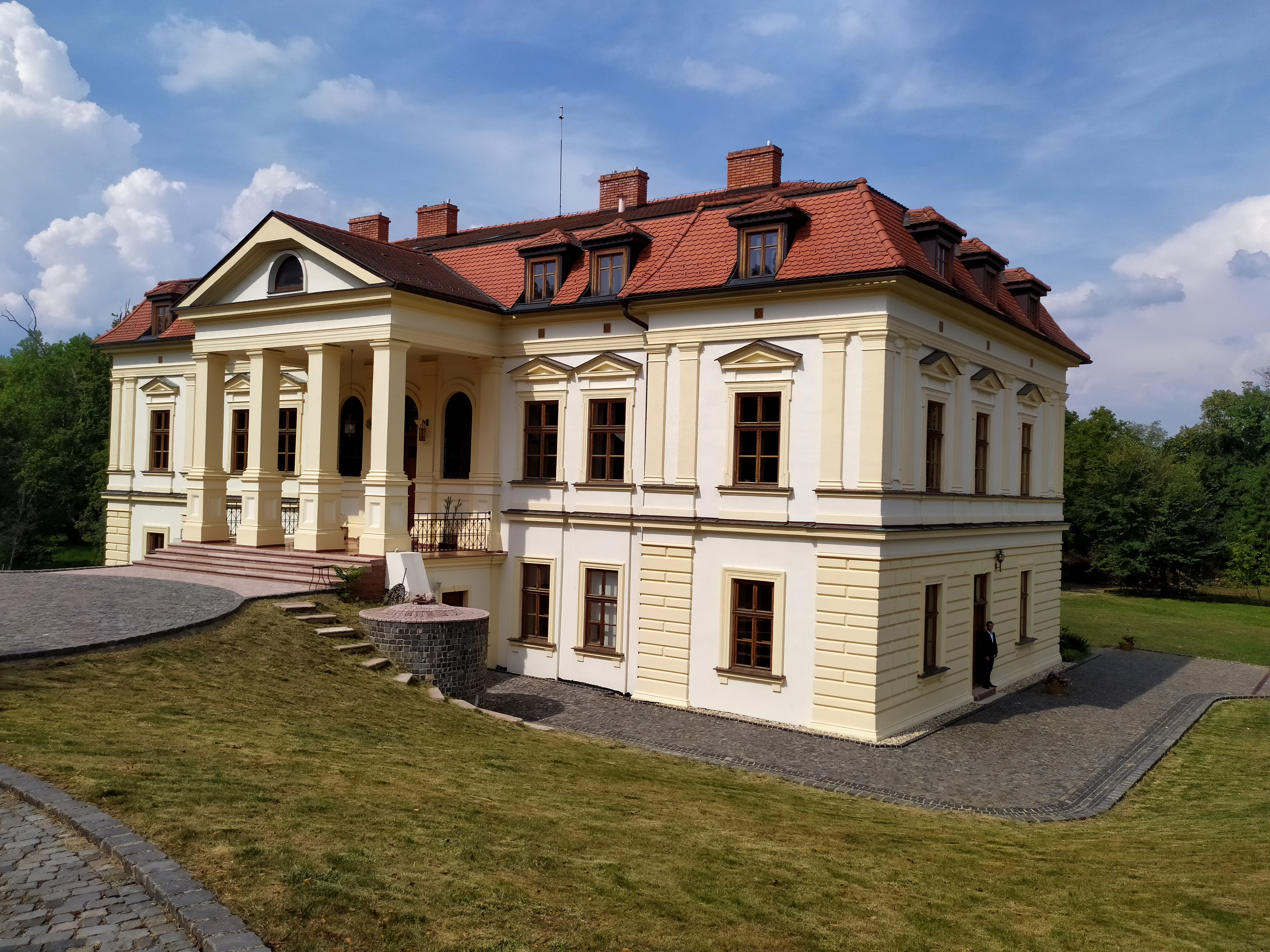

- Flag

- Location of Kuzmice district Topoľčany in the Nitra Region Location of Kuzmice district Topoľčany in Slovakia
- Country: Slovakia
- Region: Nitra Region
- District: Topoľčany District
- First mentioned: 1390

Area
  - Total: 0.00 km^{2} (0 sq mi)
- Elevation: 194 m (636 ft)

Population (2025)
  - Total: 770
- Time zone: UTC+1 (CET)
  - Summer (DST): UTC+2 (CEST)
- Postal code: 956 21
- Area code: +421 38
- Vehicle registration plate (until 2022): TO
- Website: www.kuzmice.sk

Kuzmice (Hungarian: Nyitrakozma) is a municipality in the Topoľčany District of the Nitra Region, Slovakia. In 2011 it had 683 inhabitants.

== Population ==
Population statistic (10 years)
Year	1995	2005	2015	2025
Count	0	687	686	770
Difference		–	−0.14%	+12.24%

Population statistic
Year	2024	2025
Count	770	770
Difference		+0%

It has a population of 770 people (31 December 2025).

=== Ethnicity ===
Census 2021 (1+ %)
Ethnicity	Number	Fraction
Slovak	704	93.49%
Not found out	50	6.64%
Total	753	

In year 2021 was 753 people by ethnicity 704 as Slovak, 50 as Not found out, 4 as Italian, 4 as Hungarian, 3 as Other, 2 as Czech, 1 as Romani and 1 as Romanian.

Note on population: The difference values of population numbers in the table "Population statistic" and in the sections "Ethnicity" & "Religion" is caused by the use of various statistical methods.

=== Religion ===
Census 2021 (1+ %)
Religion	Number	Fraction
Roman Catholic Church	592	78.62%
None	98	13.01%
Not found out	47	6.24%
Total	753	

In year 2021 was 753 people by religion 592 from Roman Catholic Church, 98 from None, 47 from Not found out, 5 from Evangelical Church, 5 from Ad hoc movements, 2 from Greek Catholic Church, 1 from Calvinist Church, 1 from Christian Congregations in Slovakia, 1 from Islam and 1 from Hinduism.
