= Lubotin =

Lubotin may refer to

- Ľubotín in Slovakia
- Lubotin, a Russian transliteration of the Ukrainian city of Liubotyn, Kharkiv Oblast

== See also ==
- Lubotyn (disambiguation)
