= Považský Inovec =

Mountain range in Western Slovakia

Coordinates: 48°40′N 18°00′E

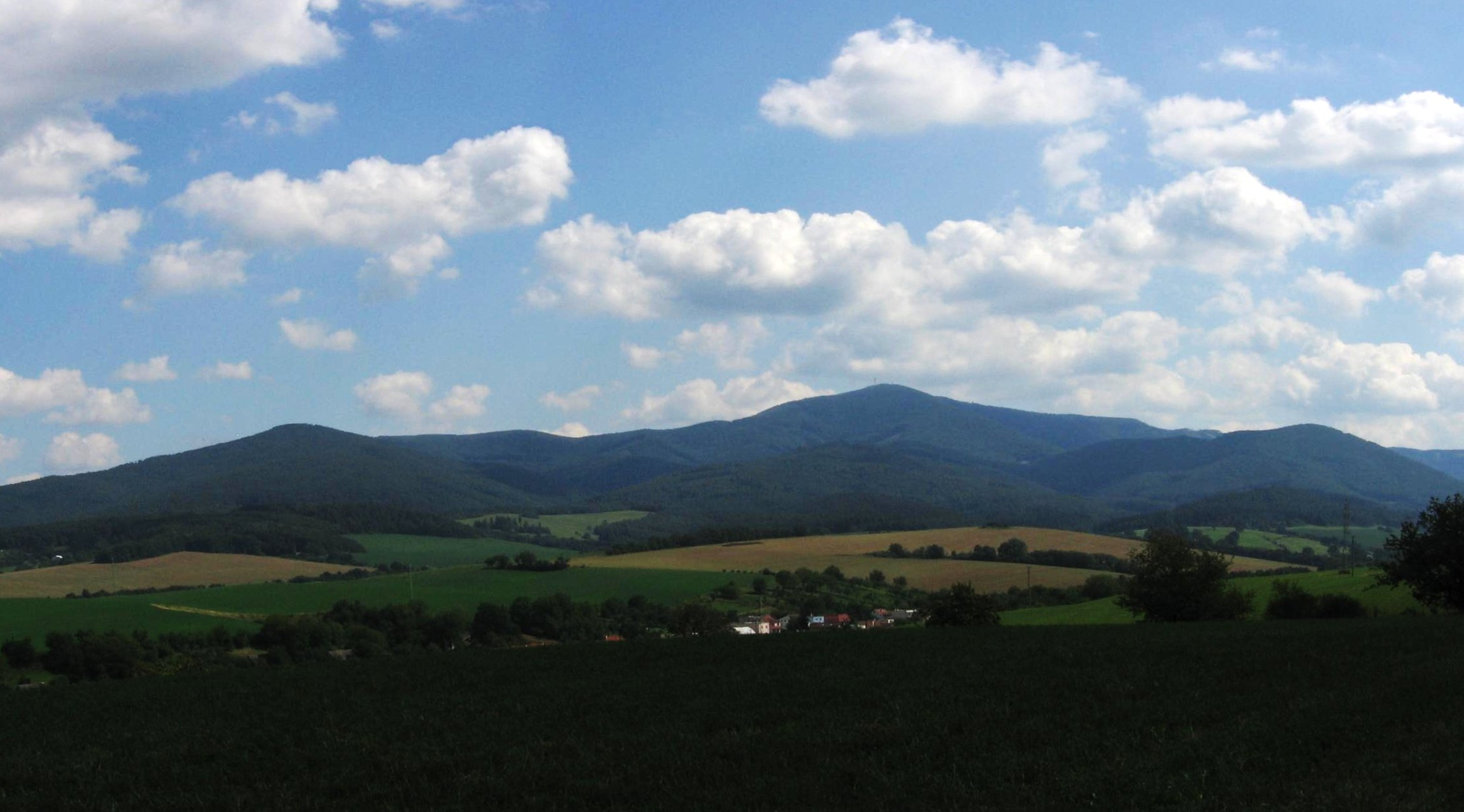
View of the northern portion of the Považskský Inovec Mts. from the Trenčianske Stankovce. The highest mountain in the center is Inovec (1042 m).

Považský Inovec is a mountain range in western Slovakia, named after the Váh river. It is 48 km (30 mi) long and 15–25 km (9.3–15.5 mi) wide mountain range. It is situated from the city of Hlohovec, raising from the Danubian Hills, and slowly raising further north until nearly to the city of Trenčín where it borders the Strážov Mountains, where is also the highest hill of the entire mountain range, Inovec (1042 m). The mountain range separates basins of the Váh and Nitra rivers.

There are many monuments in or near the mountain range, including Great Moravian hill fort Kostolec near Ducové, Hlohovec Castle near Hlohovec, Beckov Castle near Beckov, Topoľčany Castle and Tematín Castle. The famous spa city of Piešťany lies under Považský Inovec.

== Geology ==
Považský Inovec Mts. is considered as asymmetric horst emerging from the Neogene sedimentary fill of the Pannonian Basin between the Váh and Nitra rivers. The horst is bordered by steep normal faults and usually divided from north to south into three segments (or blocks). Basement rocks are in the northern portion dominated by crystalline schists (mostly diaphthorites, phyllonites, biotite micaschists and gneisses, amphibolites and migmatites). Extensive Late Paleozoic volcanosedimentary succession (Kálnica group) is present in the cover unit, in the area between the Selec and Hrádok villages. Sparse relicts of peculiar Upper Cretaceous sediments (Belice unit) are locally present in the northern and southern block. The transversal Hrádok reverse fault separates the northern block from the central block. Only the central block shows typical structure of the Fatra-Tatra Belt which is typical composed of Tatric crystalline basement composed of granitoids and gneisses, covered by the Mesozoic deposits and two superimposed cover nappes (lower Fatric unit and upper Hronic unit). Granitoid rocks form the Bojná and the Zlatníky massifs. The Fatric nappe is represented by the Zliechov succession. The Hronic nappe is preserved in outlayers, e.g. in the Tematín or Beckov Castle rocks. Both cover nappes are composed of the Triassic to Early Cretaceous rocks, mostly limestones, marlstones and dolomites. Relicts of the clastic deposits of Inner-Carpathian Paleogene Basin are found on the western slopes of the mountains.

== Paleontology ==
The Čertova pec caves near Radošina have yielded relics of multiple human habitation from the Stone Age. Finds include artifacts from the Mousterian culture (associated primarily with Neanderthals) and the later Szeletian culture.
