= József Pantocsek =

Hungarian physician

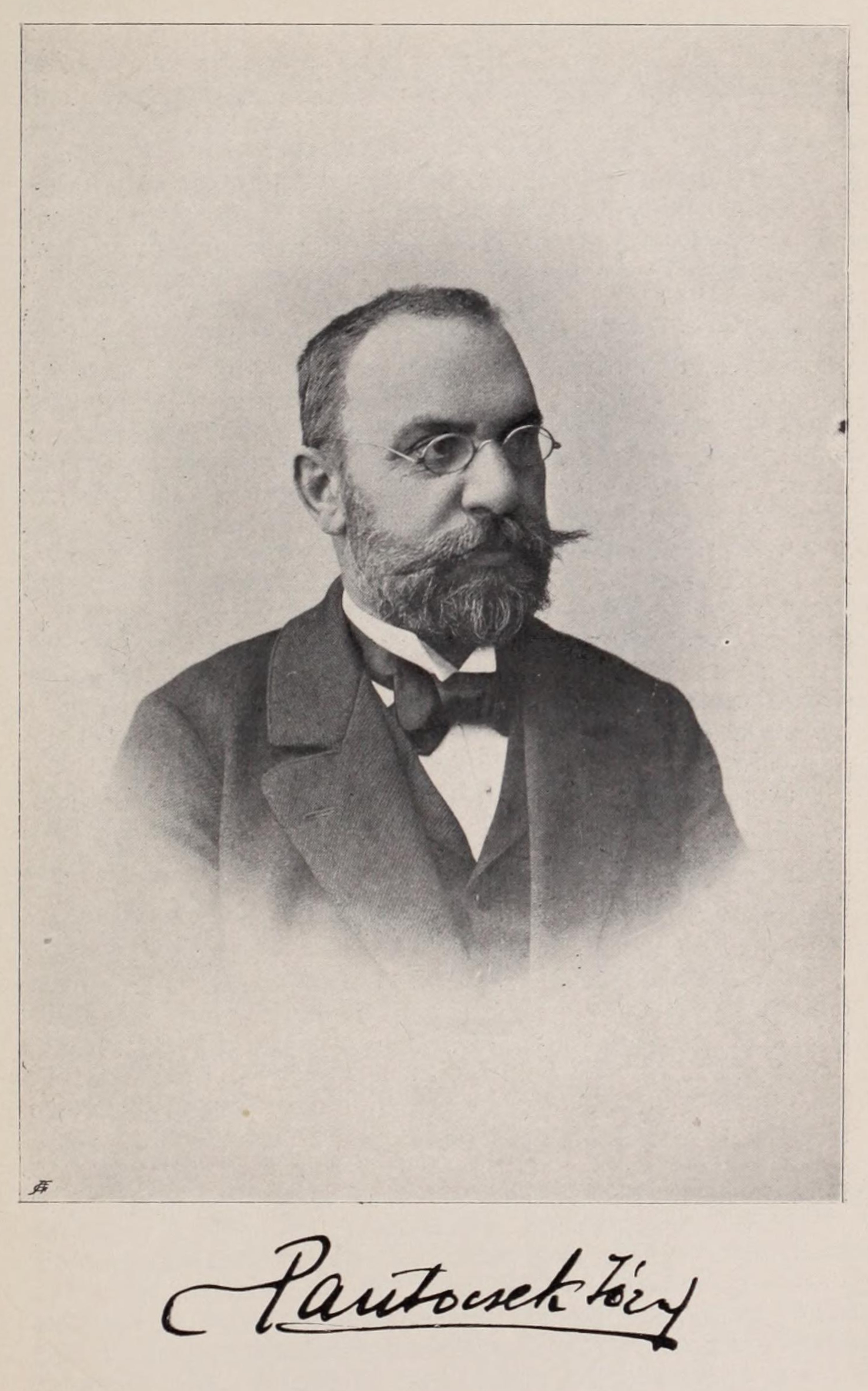

József Pantocsek (15 October 1846 – 4 September 1916) was a Hungarian physician, micropaleontologist and botanist who specialized in the diatoms, describing nearly 1300 taxa. He introduced the method of examining cores of lake sediments for their paleohistorical diatom compositions in Lake Balaton.

Pantocsek was born in Nagyszombat where his father was the pharmacist and physician Jozef Pantocsek (1799–1872). The chemist Leo Valent Pantocsek was his uncle. He grew up in Tovarníky where his mother bought an estate and went to school in Nitra, Kalksburg in Vienna and Esztergom. He studied medicine at Göttingen from 1869 and Vienna from 1870 to 1873. /1870 and in Vienna from 1870 to 1873. He practiced medicine in Tovarníky after receiving his medical degree in 1877. He became director of the state hospital at Bratislava in 1896 where he was involved in public health measures. He also introduced X-ray equipment in Hungary.

From 1866 he began to collect botanical specimens through the region, travelling through Montenegro, Herzegovina and the Carpathians. From the 1880s he made extensive collections of fossil and extant diatoms, documenting them with pioneering microphotographs. When the Lake Balaton sediments were studied by the Hungarian geologist Lajos Lóczy, Pantocsek also contributed to an examination of the diatoms on the sediments. In 1913 he provided low-resolution analysis of diatom species with their presence and absence along sections of a 4 m-long (13 ft) core taken from the Siófok Basin.

Pantocsek died of typhoid. The plant genus Pantocsekia and the diatom genus Pantocsekiella are named in his honour.
