= Kostolec fortification =

Historic site in Slovakia

Coordinates: 48.6226°N 17.8728°E

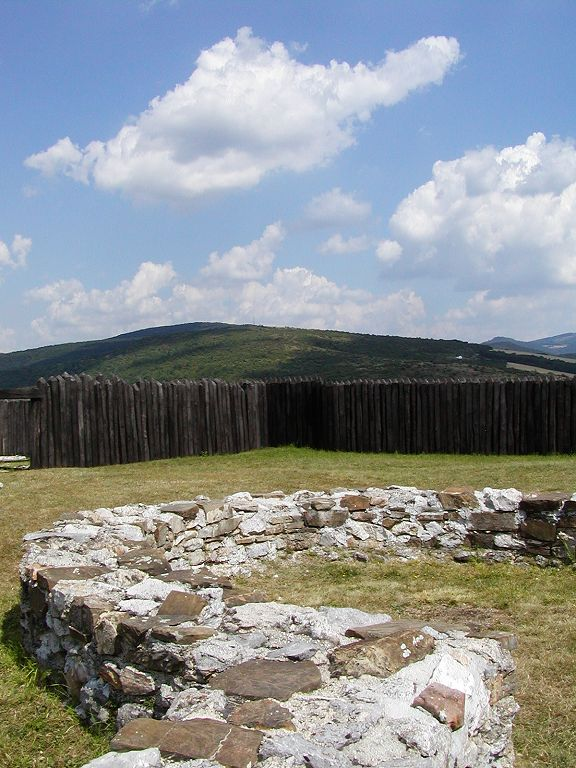
Inside the fortifications.

Kostolec is a hillfort and an important archaeological site in the Považský Inovec mountains. It was built during the ages of Great Moravia.

The name Kostolec is given to a steep rocky spur of the Považský Inovec mountain range with an altitude of 240 m above sea level, towering above the village of Ducové in the Piešťany district.

== History ==
The site is located near important ancient roads, especially the Považská branch of the Amber Road, connecting northern and Southern Europe. Ostroh became an inhabited place in several periods of prehistoric times and early historical times. A coherent overview of the development of settlement was provided by systematic archaeological research carried out at the site by the Archaeological Institute of the Slovak Academy of Sciences in Nitra in 1968–72 and 1975. Traces of settlement date back to the Old Stone Age (22,000 BC) and the Later Stone Age (2,000 BC). In the Early Bronze Age (1,100 BC), there was a significant hillfort of the Velatic-Baierdorf culture here, fortified with a massive rampart and a ditch inside the area with a settlement and production facilities. Traces of settlement from the Roman period (2nd–3rd century) also deserve attention. Kostolec played a key role in the Great Moravian period (9th century - early 10th century). A fortified early feudal noble residence was built there, a manor house with residential buildings, a proprietary church with a small burial ground for members of the ruling class and farm buildings. It was surrounded by a rampart and a deep ditch. It was a power and administrative center, to which the agricultural and craft settlements in the area were linked. Kostolec is among the most important monuments of Great Moravian culture known to date in Slovakia. After the manor house disappeared, from the second half of the 10th century to the 14th century, the site was a burial ground for several surrounding early medieval settlements. In the 15th century, several farm buildings were built here and the platform was occasionally used for military purposes due to its advantageous strategic location.

== Description ==
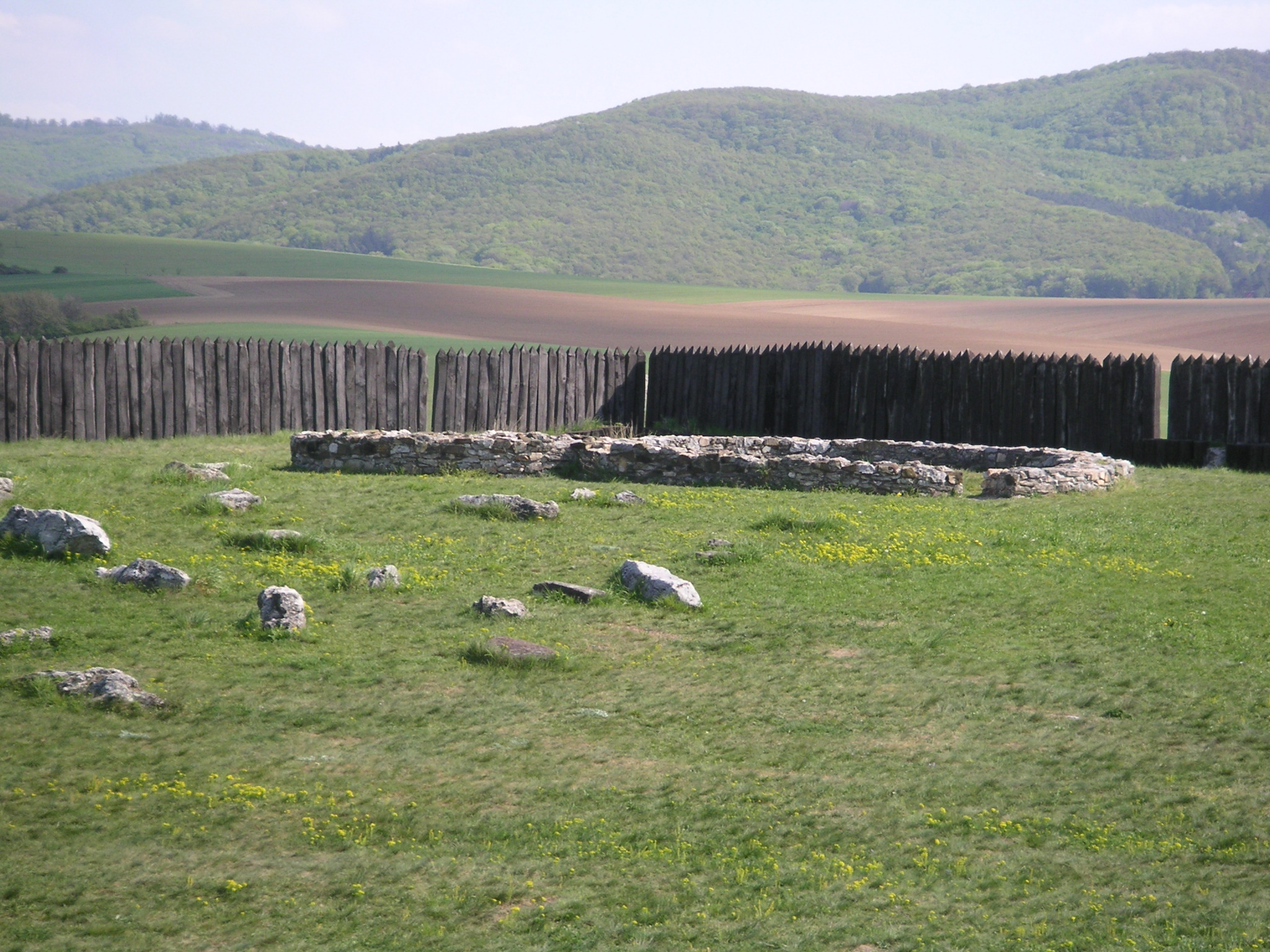
Ruins of a church and reconstructed palisades of the Great Moravian castle in Ducové

There is a fenced courtyard area with a partially reconstructed palisade fortification with a gate (facing the village of Hubina), internal palisades, a brick floor plan of a pre-Romanesque rotunda and the foundations of residential and several farm buildings. It also includes a model of a watchtower and a burial ground. The area is a protected archaeological site and is owned by the Roman Catholic Church. The church is a national cultural monument.
