= Mykhaylo Koman =

Ukrainian footballer and coach

Personal information
- Full name: Mykhaylo Mykhaylovych Koman
- Date of birth: 1 April 1928
- Place of birth: Ľubotín, Czechoslovakia
- Date of death: 21 February 2015 (aged 86)
- Place of death: Kyiv, Ukraine
- Height: 1.73 m (5 ft 8 in)
- Position: Striker

Senior career*
Years	Team	Apps	(Gls)
1947–1948	FC Enerhetyk Bushtyno	?	(?)
1948	FC Spartak Uzhhorod	15	(12)
1949–1959	FC Dynamo Kyiv	172	(62)

International career
1956	Ukraine	2	(0)

Managerial career
- 1960–1973: FC Dynamo Kyiv (ass't)
- 1976: FC Dynamo Kyiv (ass't)
- 1977–1984: FC Dynamo Kyiv (director of team)
- 1990–1991: FC Dynamo Kyiv
- * Club domestic league appearances and goals

Mykhaylo Mykhaylovych Koman (Ukrainian: Михайло Михайлович Коман; 1 April 1928 – 21 February 2015) was a Ukrainian footballer and coach of Lemko-Ruthenian origin. He was an Honoured Master of Sports and Honoured Coach of the Soviet Union.

== Early life ==
Koman was born in the village of Ľubotín (Lemkivshchyna), First Czechoslovak Republic (today Slovakia), where his family had its own little farm. In 1934, his family moved to the city of Sevlyush (Great Vineyard), in what is today western Ukraine. From an early age Mykhailo spoke Slovak and later learned Hungarian and the local dialect of Ukrainian. Mykhaylo's father became a railroad worker (first in the neighboring Korolevo and then in Vynohradiv), while his mother stayed at home. Mykhaylo had brothers Myron and Andriy, and five other siblings.

Since age 9, Koman played for the local Ukrainian national school until 1942 and later the city's engineering vocational school. In 1944-45 he played for the city team of a local mill administration. For transportation the city's team used a Studebaker bus.

== Career ==
In 1946, Koman joined newly formed Soviet clubs Partizan Vinogradov and Rus Bushtina (Bushtyno) as well as participated at the All-Ukrainian Spartakiad representing the Zakarpattia region. Later in 1948 the Zakarpattia consolidated team was transformed into the new Soviet club Spartak Uzhhorod. Koman did not stay at Uzhhorod team for too long and the same year was transferred to Dynamo Kyiv where he played until his retirement in 1959. During his years in Uzhhorod and Kyiv, he met with such football players as János Fabián and György Laver.

The transfer took place after the 1948 1/8 Cup final of the Ukrainian SSR when Spartak lost to Dynamo Kyiv 1:2. Eight players of the Uzhhorod team were transferred the very next day to Kyiv. Beside Koman to Dynamo transfer Zoltán Szengentovszkij, Ernő Juszt, Dezső Tóth and others.

Koman spent most of his playing career with FC Dynamo Kyiv, and led the team in scoring in 1953 with seven goals. In 1954 Koman scored the winning goal in the 1954 Soviet Cup Final earning Dynamo its first national trophy, the Soviet Cup.

He retired in 1959; during the team's African tour, he participated in a match in Cairo after which he experienced chest pain. Doctors diagnosed him with blockade of cardiac muscle and suggested he retire to preserve own health. During his 10 years with Dynamo Kyiv he played 172 matches, scoring 62 goals.

After retirement, Koman stayed within the Dynamo's football academy as a coach for five decades. He became an Honoured Coach of the Soviet Union. After the dissolution of the Soviet Union, he headed FC Dynamo-3 Kyiv in 1993 until it was dissolved in 2008.

In 1956 Koman played a couple of games for Ukraine at the Spartakiad of the Peoples of the USSR.

== Personal life ==
Mykhaylo Koman was married twice. He had a daughter, Eva Mykhaylivna Koman (born 1953), who lives in Hungary. He later had a son, Mykhaylo Mykhaylovich Koman (born 1991), from his second marriage.

He died 21 February 2015, age 86. He was buried in Baikove Cemetery in Kyiv.
