= Topoľčany Castle =

Historic site in Slovakia

- Topoľčiansky hrad
- Podhradie, Topoľčany District, Slovakia
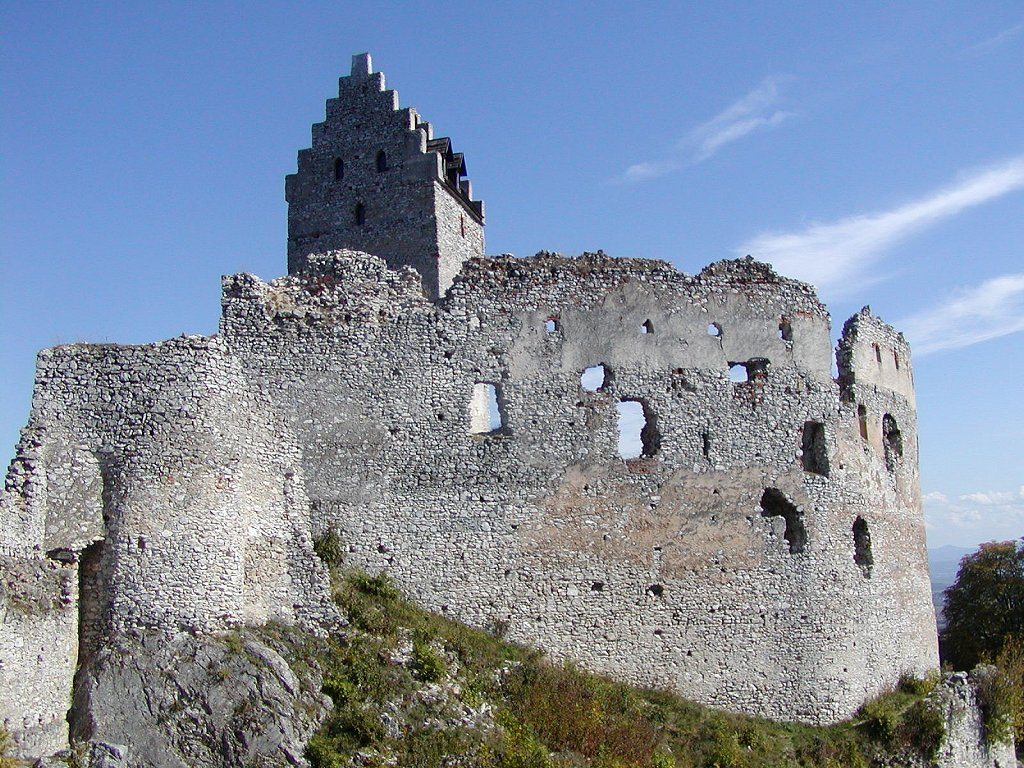
- Inner wall

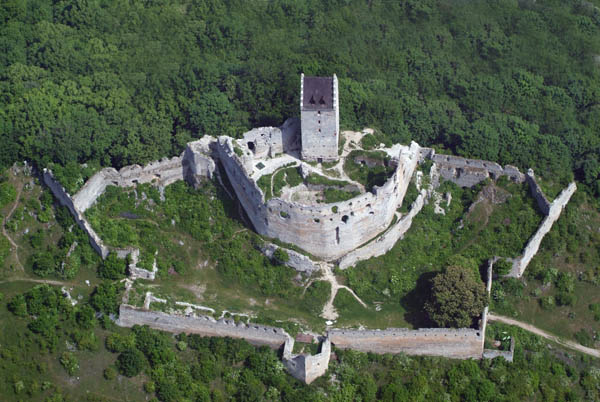
- Ariel view

Site information
- Type: Castle

Location
- Coordinates: 48.658333°N 18.049167°E

Topoľčany Castle (Slovak: Topoľčiansky hrad or hrad Topoľčany) is the ruins of a medieval castle from the 13th century. It is located in the village of Podhradie in the Topoľčany District of Slovakia, on the Považský Inovec mountain range.

The oldest written record dates back to 1235, when it was mentioned as a royal estate. Later, it was owned by various owners. From the 13th century, it served as the center of a castle estate with 26 villages. It is said that between 1431 and 1434, it was captured and held by Hussite troops; however, investigations have shown that the Hussites never occupied the castle. In the early 18th century, it was heavily damaged by imperial troops during the uprising of Francis II Rákóczi. In the mid-18th century, it was still repaired, but after the estate's administration was moved to Tovarníky, it began to fall into ruin. At the end of the 19th century, the main tower was completed in a romantic style, and part of the fortifications were conserved.

== History ==
=== First mentions ===
The settlement was founded by German settlers in the 12th century and was first mentioned in 1173 under the name Tupulchan. The estate of Tapolcsány ("terrarum Tupulchan") was granted by King Béla IV in 1235 to his vassal, Dénes, son of Dénes from the Türje family, who later became the Palatine of Hungary. After the Mongol invasion, the castle estate changed hands multiple times, owned by families such as Gutkeled and Csák. By around 1260, most of the land belonged to Matthew III Csák.

=== 1278–1321: Under control of Matthew III Csák ===
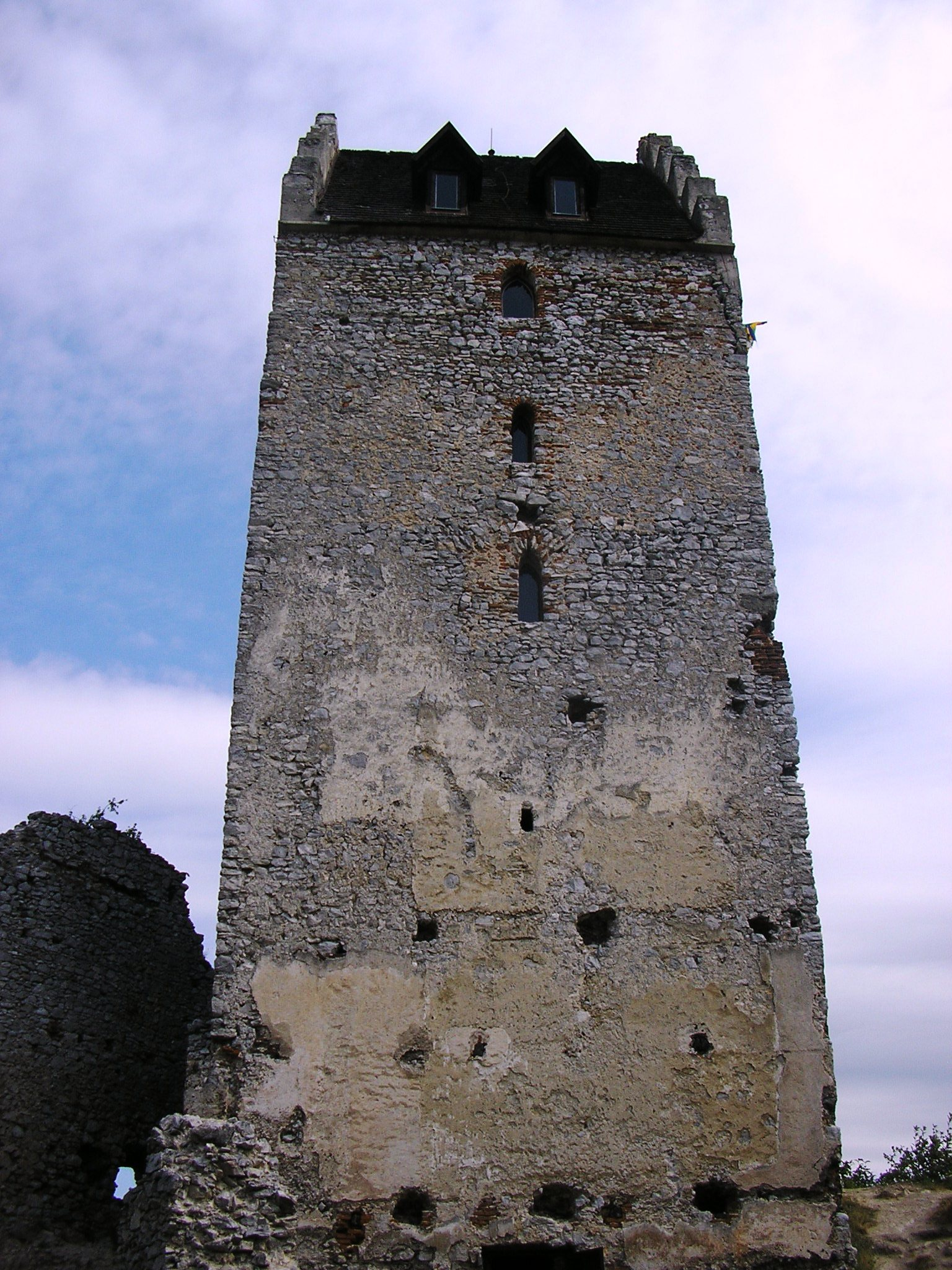
View of the castle's Bergfried, with a height of at 21 meters.

In 1278, Csák, issued a charter from Tapolcsány, and in his will in 1283, he bequeathed the town as a toll, passing it to his widow until her death, after which his brother Csák Péter became the heir. During the 13th century, the castle's name appeared in various forms, but it was only once explicitly mentioned in a 1318 document. According to a 14th-century diploma and dendrochronological studies of the old tower, the castle was likely built by oligarch Csák in the early 14th century. Strategically situated, it controlled the Nitra valley and was in visual contact with other castles like Gýmeš and Zayugróc, serving as a residence and defensive point.

The castle consisted of an ancient tower built on a rocky cliff and a surrounding wall in a semicircular shape. The tower measured 9x9 meters, with walls up to 2.9 meters thick on the ground floor. It had a Gothic appearance similar to the Old Tower in Trenčín, with an entrance on the second floor protected by a drawbridge, a latrine on the third floor, and it served as the main residence until the end of the 14th century.

In 1309, Csák held a council at Topoľčany. By 1318, accusations against Csák for fortifying and strengthening the castle and its surroundings are documented. After his death in 1321, the castle was besieged and taken by King Charles I, with Peter, his son, becoming a royal castle.

=== 14th–18th centuries ===
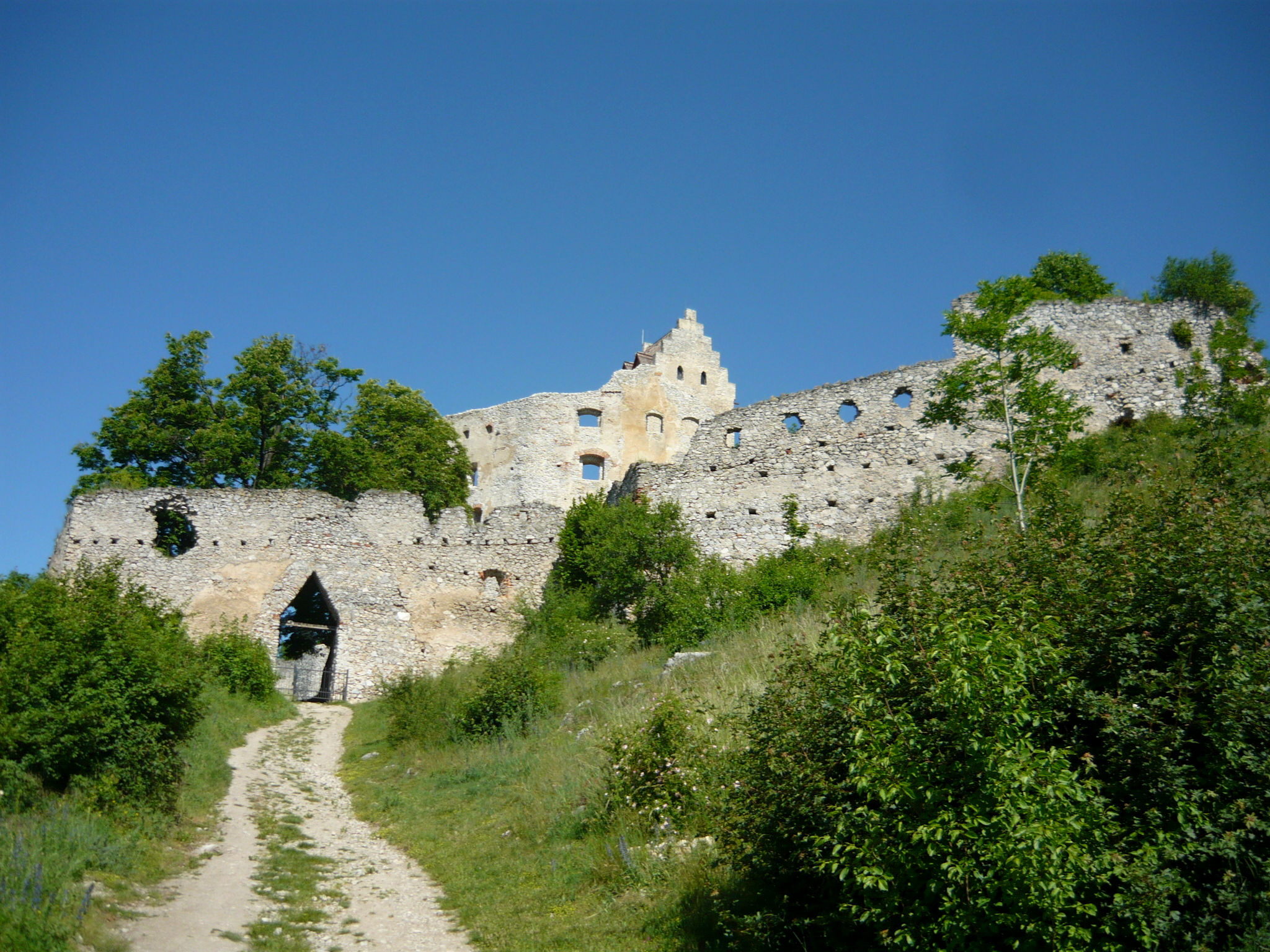
View of the castle from outside the walls

Throughout the 14th and 15th centuries, the castle was held by various noble and royal officials, including the Szécsényi family and others. It was involved in conflicts and changing hands, especially during the Hussite invasions in the 1430s and 1440s, when it was occupied by Hussite troops and later regained by the crown.

In the late 15th and early 16th centuries, ownership shifted among noble families like the Országhs and Losonci. King Mátyás rewarded Mihály Guthi Országh in 1461 with the castle and estate for his merits. During the Ottoman wars, the castle was damaged and later fortified in the 17th century by the Forgách family, who expanded and strengthened it.

In the 18th century, after the Rákóczi uprising, the castle was confiscated and sold to various owners, including the Traun family. By the end of the 18th century, the castle was in ruins but still used by locals as a chapel. The last owners, the Stummer family, purchased Tavarnok Castle in 1868, and at the turn of the 19th and 20th centuries, Baron Ágoston Stummer renovated the decaying castle in a romantic style, especially restoring the old tower. The castle's ruins were conserved, with some repairs made in 1925.
