= Imrich Medňanský =

Slovak nobleman (1861–1923)

Imrich Medňanský (Hungarian: Imrich Mednyánszky; 1861 – 28 May 1923) was an ethnic Slovak lower nobleman, Baron and owner of estates in the Lúka municipality in the Kingdom of Hungary. He was also one of the owners of the Tematín castle.

== Life ==
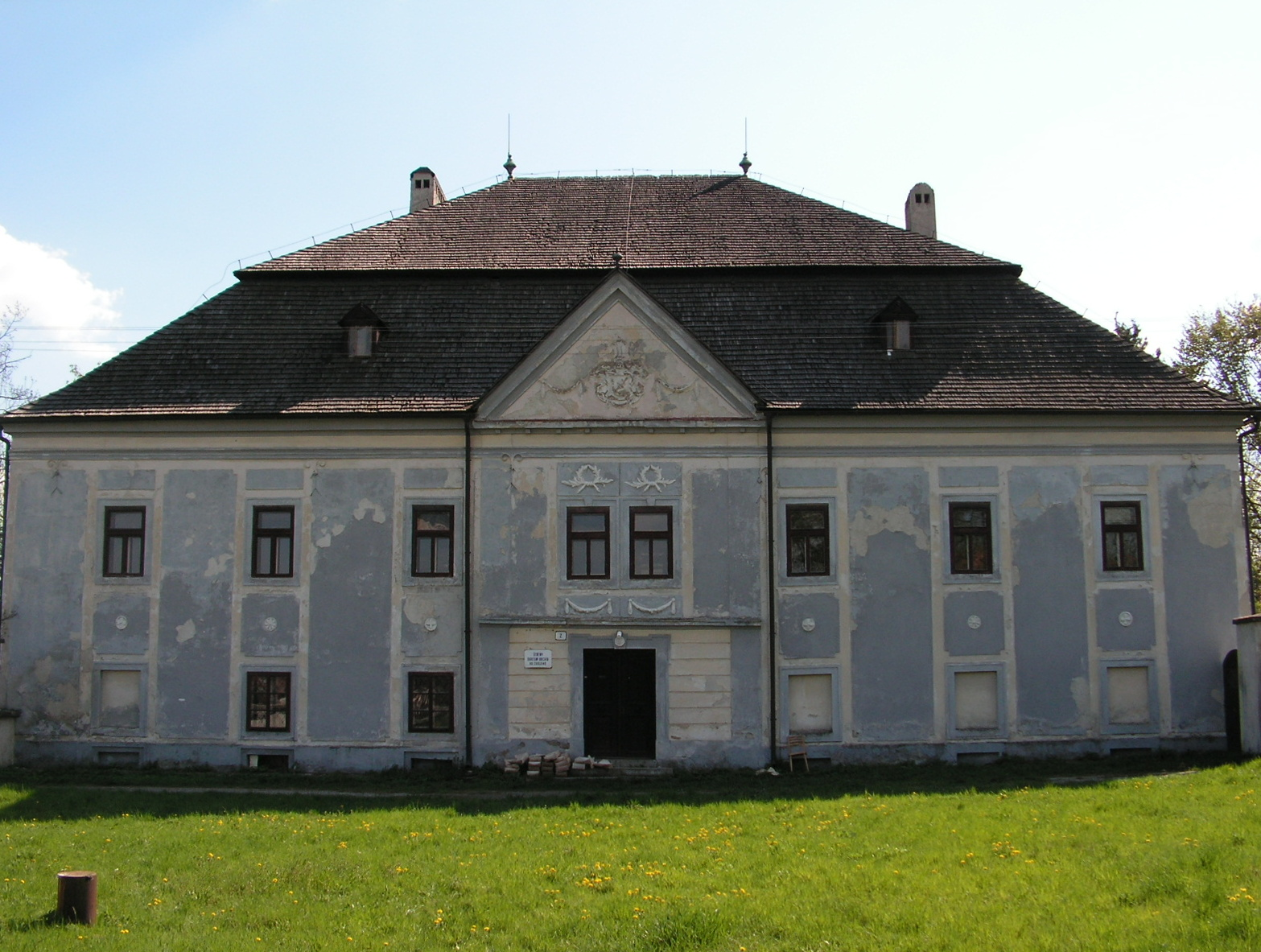
Manor house owned by the Medňanský family

Imrich Medňanský was born in 1861. The land register record indicates that Medňanský acquired ownership of part of the manor house in Lúka in 1887, with additional parts received in 1897 and 1902, eventually owning the entire property. The estate of Imrich Medňanský was significant to Lúka's economy, providing work, especially during harvest time. After the establishment of Czechoslovakia, it was called the Lúka Economic Administration. In the 1860s, Tematín castle became the property of the Medňanský family. By 1887, he owned a portion of the castle alongside his wife Anna. In 1904, they became the sole owner of the castle. In 1921, his wife died suddenly, and an inventory showed the estate included land, forests, and livestock valued at over 814,000 CZK. Medňanský remarried on 9 May 1923, but he died suddenly during his honeymoon, and the estate then passed to his second wife, Magdaléna.

Jozef Ľudovít Holuby, in 1902, mentioned Baron Medňanský, either Imrich or his father Dionýz, as the author of a marble slab at Tematín Castle. The slab was created in 1899 but was destroyed in 1919 by the inhabitants of Czechoslovakia due to it being written in Hungarian text.

== Family ==
Medňanský was the son of Dionýz Medňanský, who was a Hungarian nobleman, civil servant and writer. In addition to his official duties, he was also involved in history, statistics, archaeology, publishing and ethnography.

== See also ==
- Medňanský
