= Medňanský =

Medňanský (Hungarian: Mednyánszky) is a surname of Slovak origin. It derives from the village Medné (now a part of Lednické Rovne) with the suffix "-ský" in the role of nobiliary particle ("of Medné"). The name was influenced by the local Western-Slovak dialect.

It may refer, among others, to the following people:

- Martin Medňanský (1840–1899), Slovak priest, writer and national activist
- László Mednyánszky (1852–1919), Hungarian painter
- Imrich Medňanský (1861–1923), Slovak Baron and nobleman

== See also ==
- Lednické Rovne
