= Podhradie, Topoľčany District =

Municipality in Topoľčany District, Slovakia

Podhradie district Topoľčany Kővárhely
- Municipality
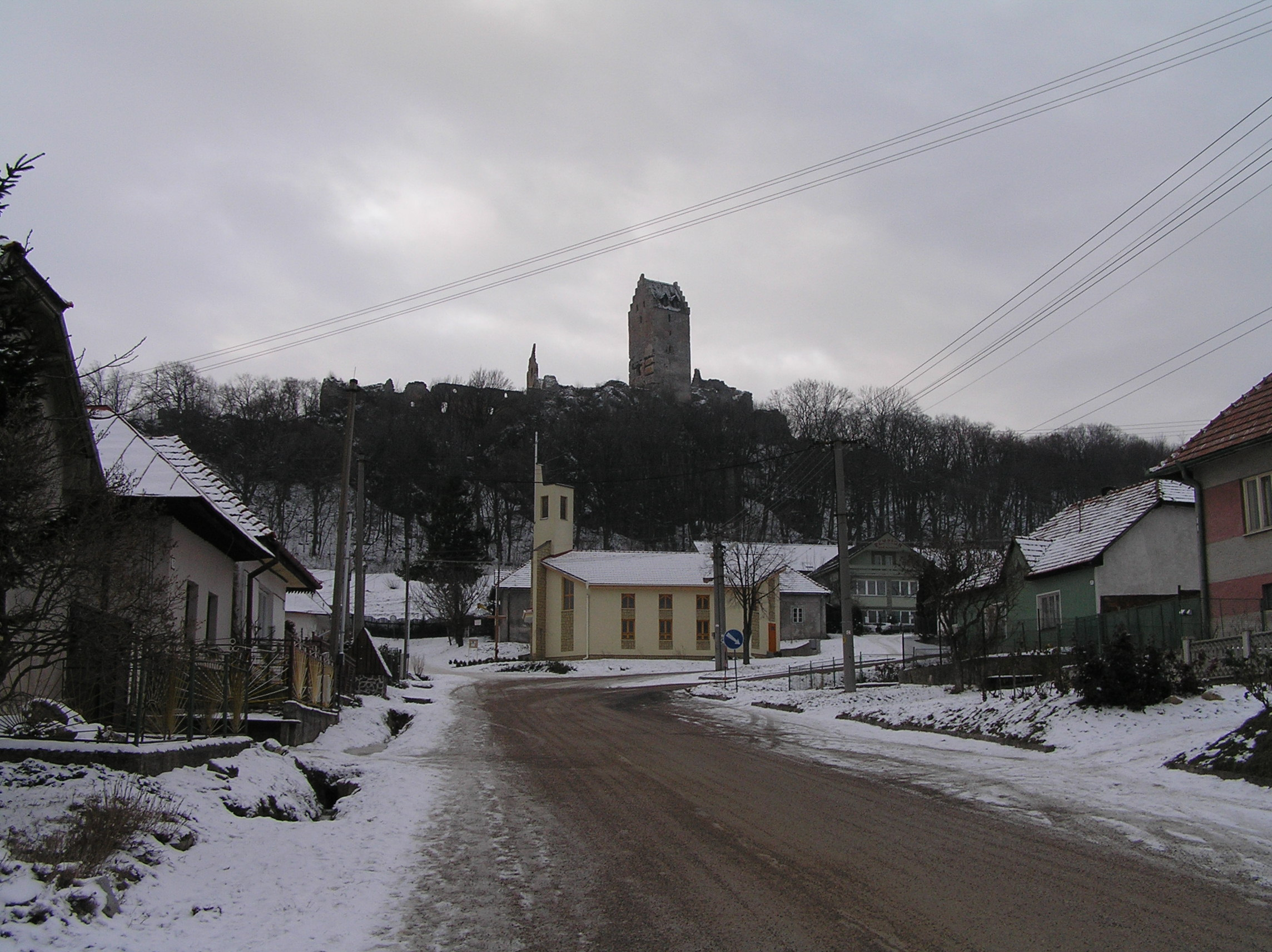
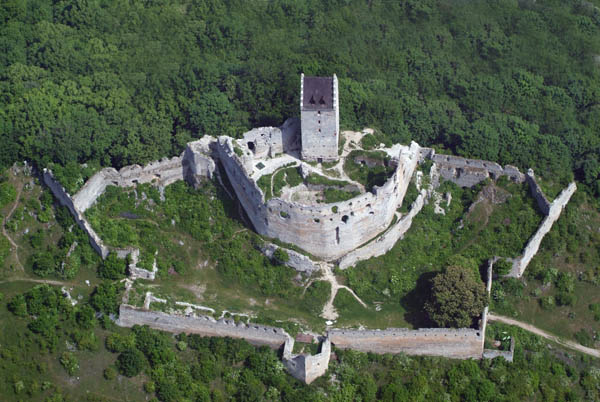
- Podhradie, Topoľčany Castle is visible in the background Topoľčany Castle

- Flag

- Location of Podhradie district Topoľčany in the Nitra Region Location of Podhradie district Topoľčany in Slovakia
- Country: Slovakia
- Region: Nitra Region
- District: Topoľčany District
- First mentioned: 1235

Area
  - Total: 30.10 km^{2} (11.62 sq mi)
- Elevation: 434 m (1,424 ft)

Population (2025)
  - Total: 289
- Time zone: UTC+1 (CET)
  - Summer (DST): UTC+2 (CEST)
- Postal code: 955 01
- Area code: +421 38
- Vehicle registration plate (until 2022): TO
- Website: topolcianskyhrad.sk

Podhradie (Hungarian: Kővárhely) is a municipalityin the Topoľčany District of the Nitra Region, Slovakia. In 2011 it had 304 inhabitants.

== History and description ==
Podhradie lies on the upper Slivnica stream. The center of the village sits at 435 meters above sea level, while the village territory varies from 223 to 863 meters above sea level. Podhradie occupies the site of the early settlement Hornouc, of Hrnovce, thought to have been destroyed by brigands. Iron Age fortifications existed within the current village territory. Traces of prehistoric dwellers can also be found. At one point gold was mined, coins minted and iron ore smelted. In the mid-13th century a castle keep was built and became the seat of the Topoľčany estate, which contained 26 villages. In 1390 the village appeared in records as Waralya, and in 1580 as Podhragy. Throughout the Middle Ages Podhradie had the largest population in the area. In the 15th century Hussite troops occupied Topoľčany. In the 18th century the seat of the Topoľčany domain moved to Tovarníky. When the Stummer family assumed power of Topoľčany at the end of the 19th century, it began to restore and preserve the castle ruin, which had suffered damages under repeated raids by Turks. 3 water mills were in operation until the 1930s, and under capitalism a lime kiln was in operation, as well a quarry, vineyards and a charcoal burner. In 1787 the village had 595 residents, in 1828 363, and in 1960 606. A sky slope is located behind the castle, and there is a cave next to it. The village territory includes two nature preserves.

== Population ==
Population statistic (10 years)
Year	1995	2005	2015	2025
Count	278	305	289	289
Difference		+9.71%	−5.24%	+0%

Population statistic
Year	2024	2025
Count	285	289
Difference		+1.40%

It has a population of 289 people (31 December 2025).

=== Ethnicity ===
Census 2021 (1+ %)
Ethnicity	Number	Fraction
Slovak	275	97.17%
Not found out	9	3.18%
Total	283	

In year 2021 was 283 people by ethnicity 275 as Slovak, 9 as Not found out, 1 as Czech, 1 as Italian and 1 as Other.

Note on population: The difference values of population numbers in the table "Population statistic" and in the sections "Ethnicity" & "Religion" is caused by the use of various statistical methods.

=== Religion ===
Census 2021 (1+ %)
Religion	Number	Fraction
Roman Catholic Church	204	72.08%
None	51	18.02%
Not found out	8	2.83%
Apostolic Church	7	2.47%
Christian Congregations in Slovakia	5	1.77%
Total	283	

In year 2021 was 283 people by religion 204 from Roman Catholic Church, 51 from None, 8 from Not found out, 7 from Apostolic Church, 5 from Christian Congregations in Slovakia, 2 from Old Catholic Church, 2 from Evangelical Church, 1 from Calvinist Church, 1 from Other and not ascertained christian church, 1 from New Apostolic Church and 1 from Ad hoc movements.

== See also ==
- Topoľčany Castle
