= Dechet =

Dechet is a surname. Notable people with the surname include:

- Alexandre Dechet (1801–1830), French actor and lyricist
- Ján Dechet (1908–1968), Slovak Roman Catholic priest
