= Lubotyń =

- Lubotyń, Greater Poland Voivodeship
- Lubotyń, Opole Voivodeship

== See also ==
- Ľubotín
- Liubotyn
