= Čertova pec =

Cave and archaeological site in Slovakia

- Devil's furnace
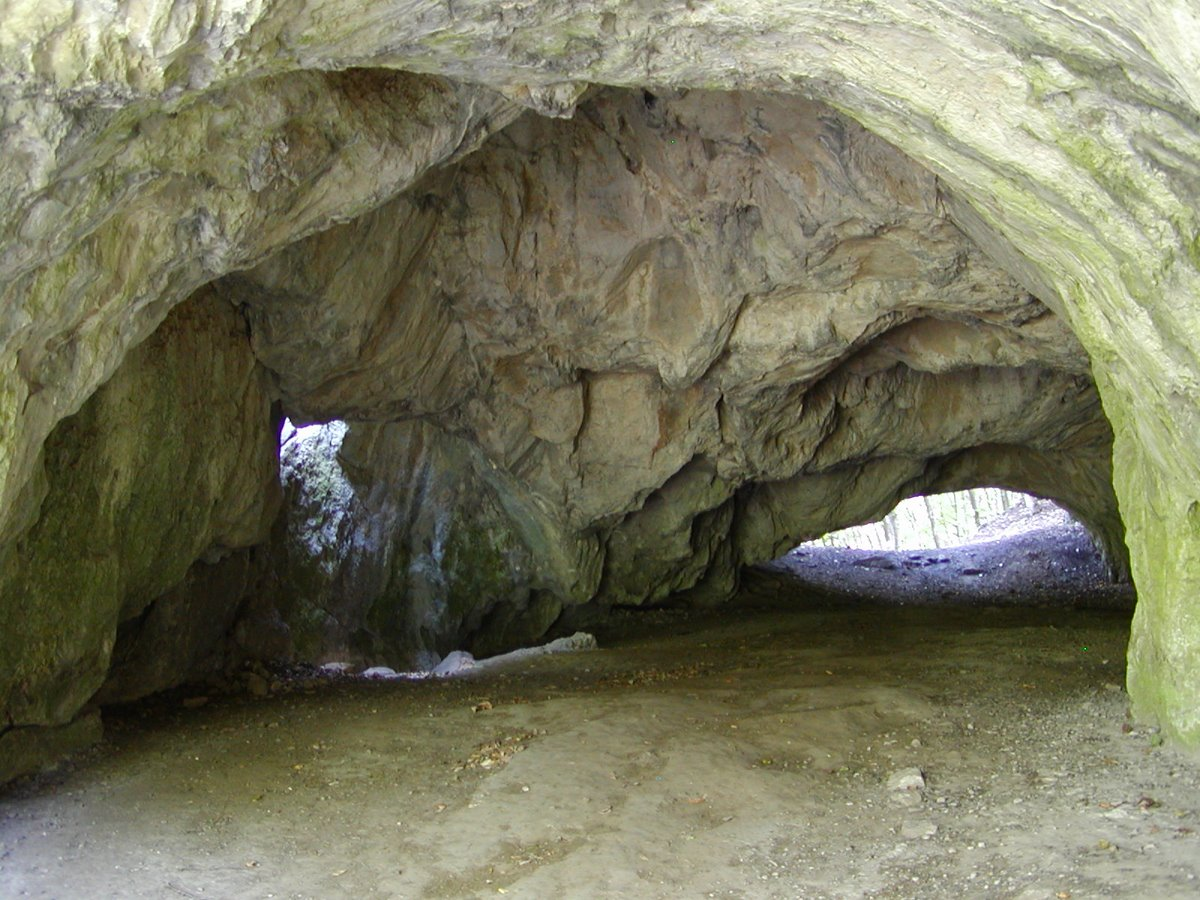
- Čertova pec cave interior

- location in Slovakia
- 48°33′37″N 17°54′55″E
- Periods: Palaeolithic
- Location: near Radošina, Považský Inovec mountains
- Region: Nitra Region, Slovakia

Čertova pec (English: Devil's furnace) is a small karst cave in the Považský Inovec mountains of Slovakia. It is located near Radošina, in the Nitra Region. As well as being a modern recreational site, the cave is known to have yielded material evidence of repeated human presence and habitation during the Stone Age.

== Overview ==
The cave with total length of 27 m (89 ft), is a protected natural monument due to its paleontological significance. The surrounding area of Certova pec is also a recreational site which includes a motel, a campsite, and a playground. There are three hiking trails in the vicinity.

== Paleontology ==
The site has yielded relics of multiple habitation phases during the Palaeolithic period. The earliest finds are attributed to the Mousterian culture (associated primarily with Neanderthals). In addition to this is an assemblage of objects tentatively associated with the Szeletian culture, a local designation that roughly corresponds with the contemporary Gravettian culture. A radiocarbon date of Szeletian cultural artifacts suggests prehistoric human presence in the cave at around 38,400 years ago.
