= Lúka =

- Municipality
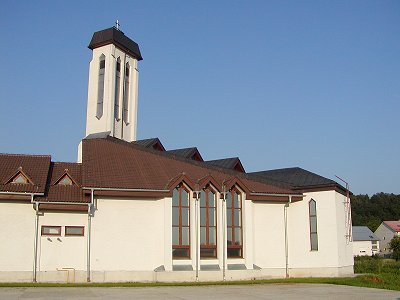
- Modern church in Lúka

- Flag

- Location of Lúka in the Trenčín Region Location of Lúka in Slovakia
- Coordinates: 48.67°N 17.88°E
- Country: Slovakia
- Region: Trenčín Region
- District: Nové Mesto nad Váhom District
- First mentioned: 1426

Area
  - Total: 17.40 km^{2} (6.72 sq mi)
- Elevation: 174 m (571 ft)

Population (2025)
  - Total: 750
- Time zone: UTC+1 (CET)
  - Summer (DST): UTC+2 (CEST)
- Postal code: 916 34
- Area code: +421 33
- Vehicle registration plate (until 2022): NM
- Website: www.obecluka.sk

Lúka (Hungarian: Vágluka) is a village and municipality in Nové Mesto nad Váhom District in the Trenčín Region of western Slovakia.

== History ==
In historical records the village was first mentioned in 1426. Before the establishment of independent Czechoslovakia in 1918, Lúka was part of Nyitra County within the Kingdom of Hungary. From 1939 to 1945, it was part of the Slovak Republic.

== Geography ==
The municipality lies at an altitude of 174 metres (571 ft) and covers an area of 17.40 km^{2} (6.72 sq mi) (2025).

== Population ==
Population statistic (10 years)
Year	1995	2005	2015	2025
Count	546	570	663	750
Difference		+4.39%	+16.31%	+13.12%

Population statistic
Year	2024	2025
Count	734	750
Difference		+2.17%

It has a population of 750 people (31 December 2025).

=== Ethnicity ===
Census 2021 (1+ %)
Ethnicity	Number	Fraction
Slovak	680	97%
Not found out	13	1.85%
Hungarian	9	1.28%
Total	701	

In year 2021 was 701 people by ethnicity 680 as Slovak, 13 as Not found out, 9 as Hungarian, 7 as Czech, 3 as Rusyn, 2 as Italian and 1 as Bulgarian.

Note on population: The difference values of population numbers in the table "Population statistic" and in the sections "Ethnicity" & "Religion" is caused by the use of various statistical methods.

=== Religion ===
Census 2021 (1+ %)
Religion	Number	Fraction
Roman Catholic Church	450	64.19%
None	142	20.26%
Evangelical Church	73	10.41%
Not found out	18	2.57%
Other	7	1%
Total	701	

In year 2021 was 701 people by religion 450 from Roman Catholic Church, 142 from None, 73 from Evangelical Church, 18 from Not found out, 7 from Other, 4 from Greek Catholic Church, 2 from Buddhism, 2 from Ad hoc movements, 1 from Old Catholic Church, 1 from Other and not ascertained christian church and 1 from United Methodist Church.

== Notable residents ==
- Imrich Medňanský, local nobleman and owner of Lúka Manor

== Trivia ==
'Lúka' is the Slovak word for meadow.
