= Szeletian =

Transitional archaeological culture

Szeletian culture
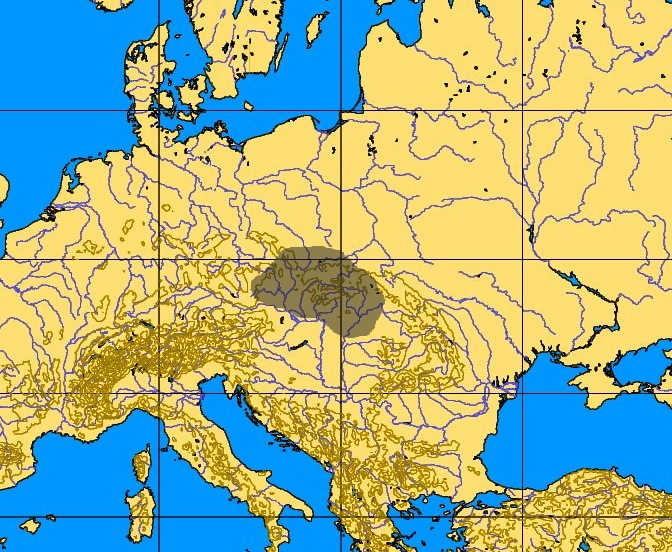
- Geographical range: Central Europe
- Period: Upper Paleolithic
- Dates: c. 44,000 BP – c. 35,000 BP
- Preceded by: Bohunician
- Followed by: Gravettian

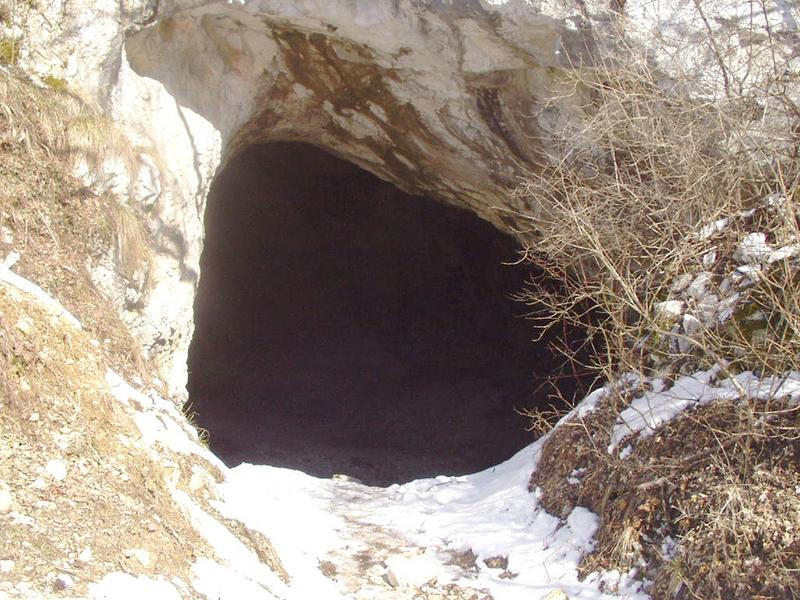
Entrance of Szeleta Cave, Bükk Mountains, Miskolc, Hungary

The Szeleta culture, or Szeletian, is a transitional archaeological culture between the Middle Paleolithic and the Upper Palaeolithic, found in Austria, Moravia, northern Hungary, and southern Poland. It is dated to 44,000 to 40,000 years ago (up to 35,000 years ago according to some scholars), a period when both Neanderthals and modern humans were present in Europe. Most experts think that it is a Neanderthal culture, but the issue is debated. It is named after Szeleta Cave in the Bükk Mountains in Hungary, though other prominent sites include Dzierżysław in Poland and Vedrovice V in Moravia.

It was preceded by the Bohunician (48,000–40,000 BP), and is roughly contemporary with the Aurignacian (43,000–26,000 BP) in France, the Uluzzian (45,000–37,000 BP) in Italy, and the Lincombian-Ranisian-Jerzmanowician (starting around 45,000 BP) in parts of Britain, Germany, and Poland. It was succeeded by the Gravettian (33,000–21,000 BP).

It is considered one of two major transitional archaeological industries in east-central Europe, along with the Bohunician.

The initial excavation of the Szeletian cave was carried out from 1906 to 1913 by Ottocar Kadić. The idea of a distinctive Szeletian culture was advocated by the Czechoslovak archaeologist František Prošek (1922–1958).

It has been called the most original and also the most aboriginal Upper Palaeolithic culture in Central Europe. The findings are often interpreted in terms of the contemporaneity of Neanderthal and modern man, "as the product of acculturation at the boundary of Middle and Upper Paleolithic."

== Lithic industry ==
The lithic industry is characterized by:

- Bifacial foliated points and sidescrapers
- Prismatic and discoid debitage
- Presence of Micoquien hand axes

Later assemblages contain endscrapers and retouched blades.

== Sites ==
In addition to the Szeletian cave in Hungary, assemblages have been found in Dzierzyslaw and Lubotyń (Poland), at Čertova Pec in Slovakia, and at Pod Hradem (Moravia).
