= Katarína Kolníková =

Slovak actress (1921–2006)

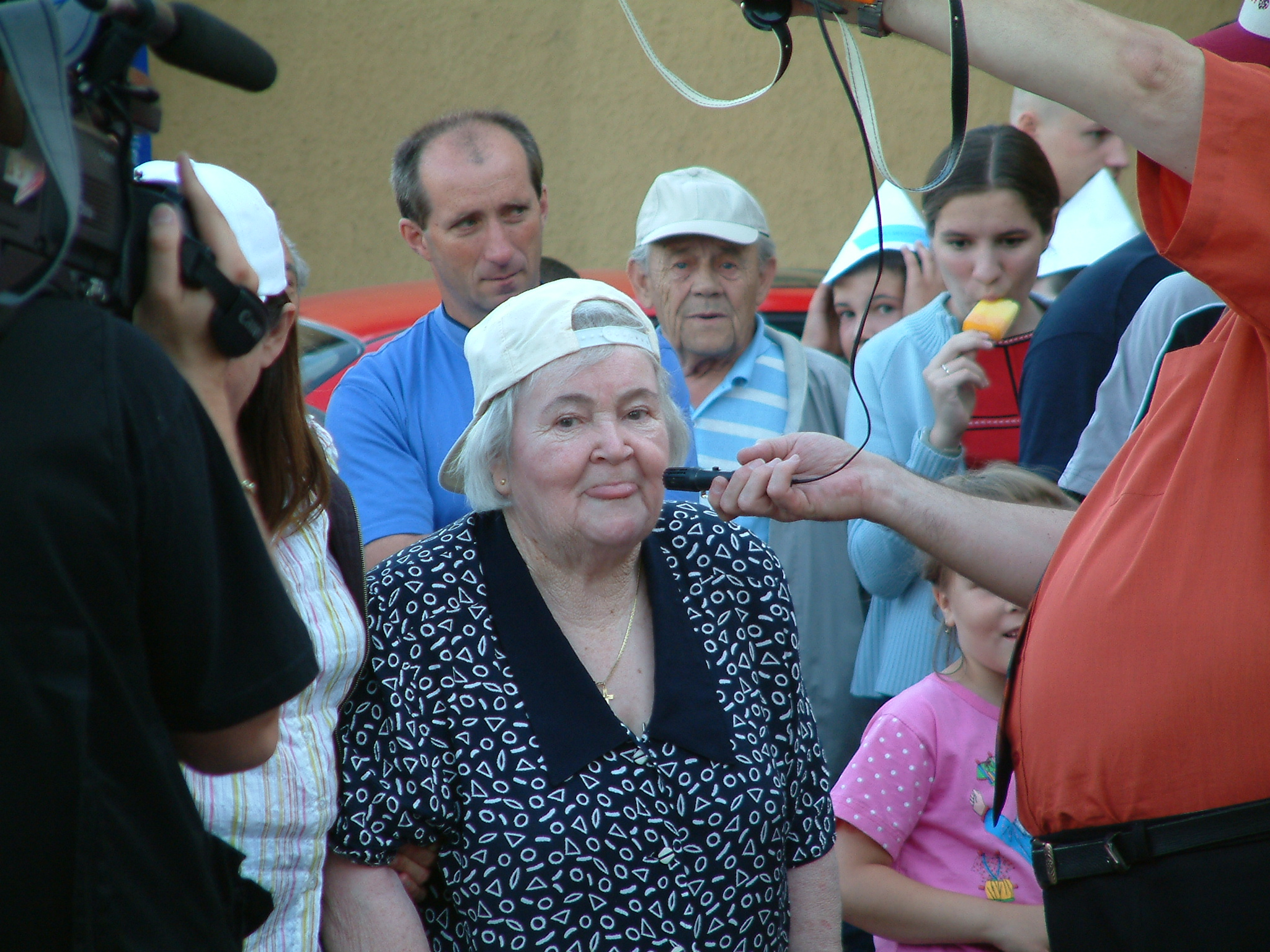
- Kolníkova interviewed in 2004
- Born: Katarína Beňovičová; 20 April 1921; Radošina, Czechoslovakia
- Died: 29 May 2006 (aged 85); Radošina, Slovakia
- Occupation: Actress
- Years active: 1932–2006
- Spouse: Michal Kolník (m. 1941; div. 1945)
- Children: 4

Katarína Kolníková (née Beňovičová; 20 April 1921 – 29 May 2006) was a Slovak stage actress.

== Biography ==
Katarína Kolníková was born in Radošina. She was one of nine children raised alone by her mother after her father, a railroad worker whose income used to provide for the family, abandoned his wife and children. Kolníková grew up in extreme poverty, having to work as a laborer for the church. Out of her siblings, only herself and her brother Ján survived until adulthood.

Kolníková acted since she was 11 years old. In her adulthood, she moonlighted as an amateur actress, while supporting her family with her daytime job as a nursery teacher. In 1971, she became a member of the Radošina Naive Theatre.

== Acting career ==
Kolníková acted in 17 plays as an amateur actress and 21 plays as a member of the Radošina Naive Theatre. Most of the Radošina Naive Theatre plays she featured in were directed by Stanislav Štepka, with whom she closely collaborated for most of the life as an actress.

Although she was not trained as an actress, her long acting career earned her legendary status among Slovak theatre fans. In 2001, she was inducted into the Hall of Fame at the OTO Awards.

In addition to stage acting, Kolníková dabbled in radio and television acting. Notably she starred in the 1995 movie Vášnivý bozk.

== Death ==
Kolníková died in Radošina on 29 May 2006, only a month after starring in her last play with the Radošina Naive Theatre.

== Personal life ==
Katarína Kolníková was a devout Catholic. She suffered from chronic illnesses her entire life as a consequence of growing up in extreme poverty.

From 1941 to 1945 she was married to Michal Kolník. They divorced after he emigrated to America after the end of World War II. Together, they had four children.
