= Ducové =

- Municipality
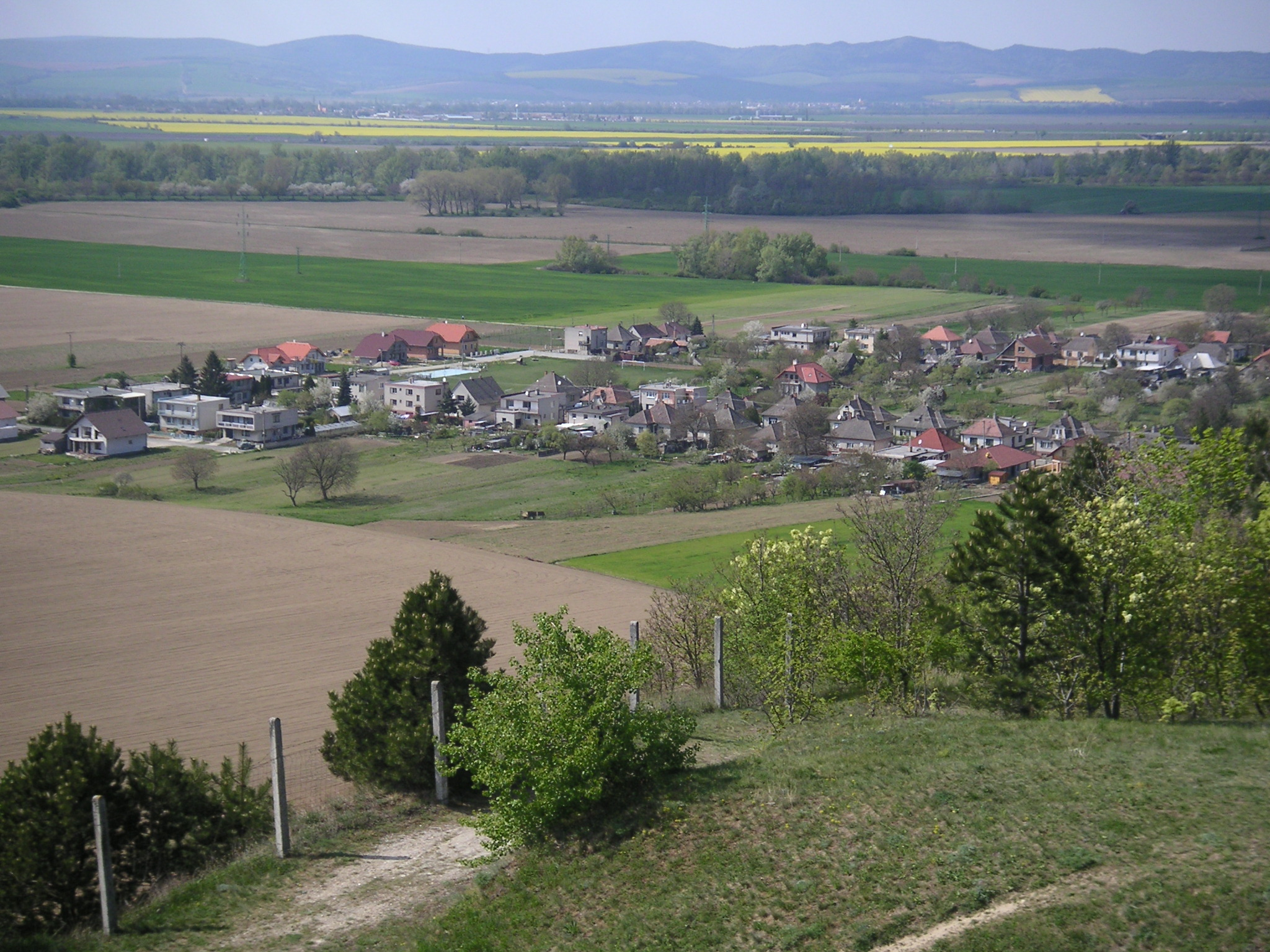

- Flag

- Location of Ducové in the Trnava Region Location of Ducové in Slovakia
- Coordinates: 48°37′42″N 17°52′05″E
- Country: Slovakia
- Region: Trnava Region
- District: Piešťany District
- First mentioned: 1353

Government
  - Mayor: Mária Koláriková

Area
  - Total: 2.63 km^{2} (1.02 sq mi)
- Elevation: 171 m (561 ft)

Population (2025)
  - Total: 479
- Time zone: UTC+1 (CET)
  - Summer (DST): UTC+2 (CEST)
- Postal code: 922 21
- Area code: +421 33
- Vehicle registration plate (until 2022): PN
- Website: ducove.sk

Ducové (Hungarian: Ducó) is a municipality (village) situated in western Slovakia, near the spa town of Piešťany. It was part of the municipality Moravany nad Váhom from 1976 to 1992. The village lies under the Váh Inovec. According to the 2011 census, the municipality had 375 inhabitants. 365 of inhabitants were Slovaks and 10 others and unspecified.

== Geography ==
The municipality lies at an altitude of 171 metres (561 ft) and covers an area of 2.63 km^{2} (1.02 sq mi) (2025).

== Etymology ==
The name of the village is derived from dux-ducis meaning duke. Duka was also a borrowed word used by the Slavs for a person with a prominent social status. The village was known as 1348 Duchreuy, 1453 Duczev, 1521 De-chobrod, 1532, 1638 Ducibrod, 1576 Ducybrod, 1636 Duczowa, 1664 Ducó, 1667 Duczo, 1668 Duczove, 1693 Duczowa, 1753 Duczó, 1776 Duczo, 1773 Duczo, Dutzo, Duczowe, 1786 Duczo, Duczowce, 1808 Duczó, Ducow, 1863 -1918 Ducó, 1920 Ducov, Ducové, 1927 Ducové.

== Great Moravian Court ==
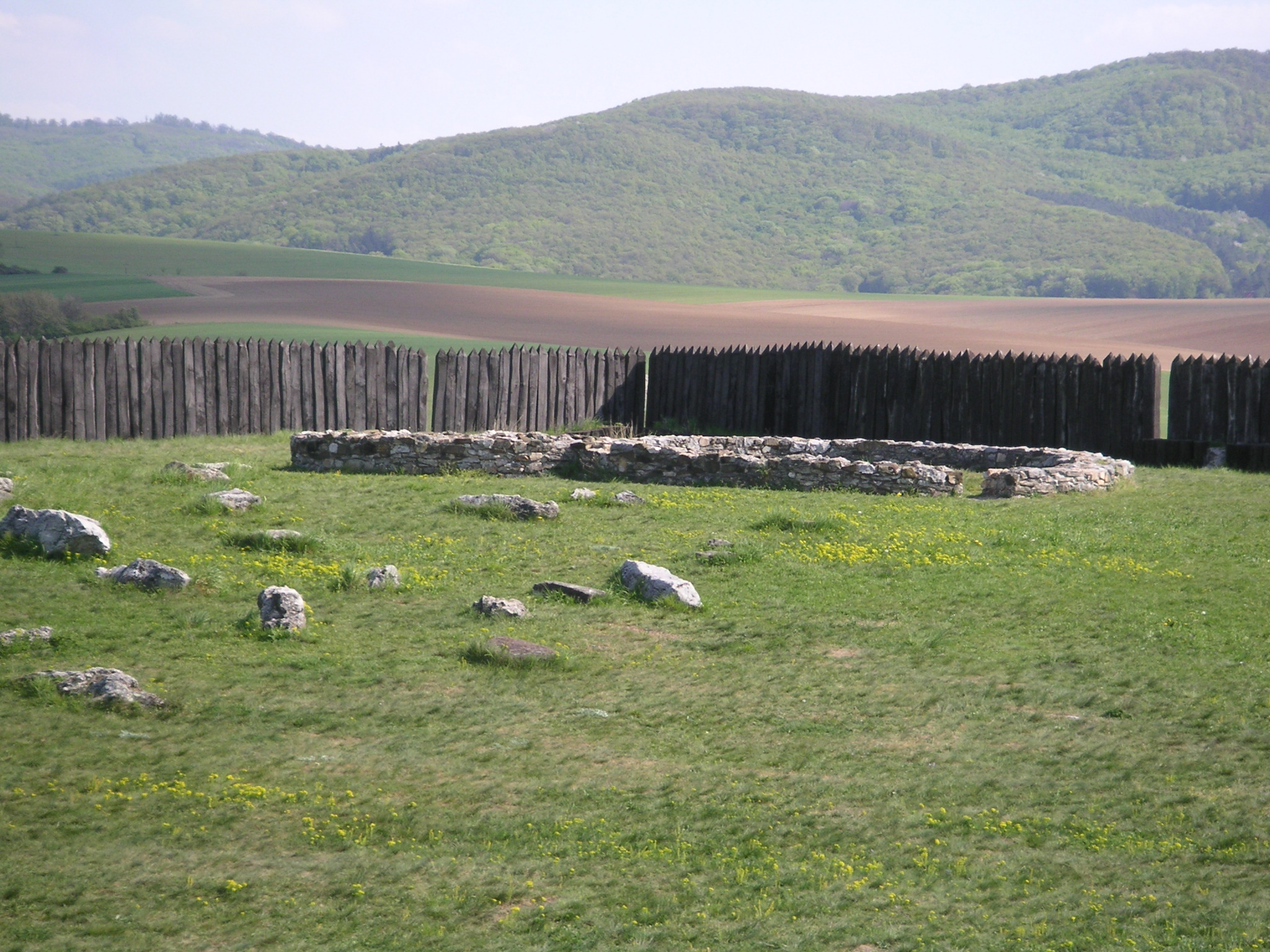
Ruins of a church and reconstructed palisades of the Great Moravian castle in Ducové

Ducové is known for an archaeological site, called the Kostolec fortification, where a Great Moravian fortified settlement has been unearthed. Excavations of older settlements from the Stone Age, Bronze Age and the Roman era indicate that Ducové benefited from its location on the Amber Road well before the Great Moravian era. The Slavic court was founded in the mid-9th century after the fall of the nearby hill fort in Pobedim, frequently associated with the unification of principality of Moravia and Nitra. The court was similar to Frankish courts from the 8th-9th centuries and inhabited by representatives of the Slavic elite. It was protected by a massive oak palisade, doubled on one side and built on top of the prehistoric mound. Administrative and representative functions were highlighted by the strategic location near the river ford. Interior space was divided by additional palisades and occupied by residential buildings, outbuildings, a Christian rotunda church and a graveyard. The round rotunda with an apse is similar to rotunda found in Staré Město. The court existed until 940-970 when it burned, most likely during the attack of the old Hungarians. The rotunda and the graveyard had been used by neighbouring villages also after the destruction of the residential buildings, the rotunda until the 11-12 century and the graveyard until the 14th.

The site is registered as a National Cultural Landmark. Some parts of the court (such as its palisades) have been reconstructed by archaeologists.

== Population ==
Population statistic (10 years)
Year	1995	2005	2015	2025
Count	340	356	444	479
Difference		+4.70%	+24.71%	+7.88%

Population statistic
Year	2024	2025
Count	482	479
Difference		−0.62%

It has a population of 479 people (31 December 2025).

=== Ethnicity ===
Census 2021 (1+%)
Ethnicity	Number	Fraction
Slovak	433	94.74%
Not found out	12	2.62%
Czech	9	1.96%
Other	5	1.09%
Total	457	

In year 2021 was 457 people by ethnicity 433 as Slovak, 12 as Not found out, 9 as Czech, 5 as Other, 2 as Jewish, 2 as Moravian, 1 as Italian, 1 as Romani, 1 as Rusyn, 1 as Russian, 1 as Austrian and 1 as Hungarian.

Note on population: The difference values of population numbers in the table "Population statistic" and in the sections "Ethnicity" & "Religion" is caused by the use of various statistical methods.

=== Religion ===
Census 2021 (1+%)
Religion	Number	Fraction
Roman Catholic Church	288	63.02%
None	126	27.57%
Not found out	14	3.06%
Evangelical Church	11	2.41%
Other	6	1.31%
Total	457	

In year 2021 was 457 people by religion 288 from Roman Catholic Church, 126 from None, 14 from Not found out, 11 from Evangelical Church, 6 from Other, 4 from Seventh-day Adventist Church, 2 from Christian Congregations in Slovakia, 2 from Greek Catholic Church, 1 from Calvinist Church, 1 from Other and not ascertained christian church, 1 from Islam and 1 from Ad hoc movements.

== See also ==
- List of municipalities and towns in Slovakia

== Sources ==
- Botek, Andrej (2014). Veľkomoravské kostoly na Slovensku [The Great Moravian Churches in Slovakia] (in Slovak). Bratislava: Post Scriptum. ISBN 978-80-89567-37-9.
- Ruttkay, Alexander (2007). "Významné archeologické lokality z včasného stredoveku v oblasti Považského Inovca" [Important Archaeological Sites from the Early Middle Ages in the Region of Považský Inovec]. In Pieta, Karol; Ruttkay, Alexander; Ruttkay, Matej (eds.). Bojná, hospodárske a politické centrum Nitrianskeho kniežactva (in Slovak and German). Nitra: Archeologický ústav SAV. ISBN 978-80-88709-91-6.
- Turčan, Vladimír (2012). Veľkomoravské hradiská [The Great Moravian Castles] (in Slovak). Bratislava: Dajama. ISBN 978-80-8136-013-8.

== Genealogical resources ==
The records for genealogical research are available at the state archive "Statny Archiv in Bratislava, Slovakia"

- Roman Catholic church records (births/marriages/deaths): 1783-1905 (parish B)
- Lutheran church records (births/marriages/deaths): 1783-1922 (parish B)
