= Topoľčany =

Topoľčany Nagytapolcsány
- Municipality
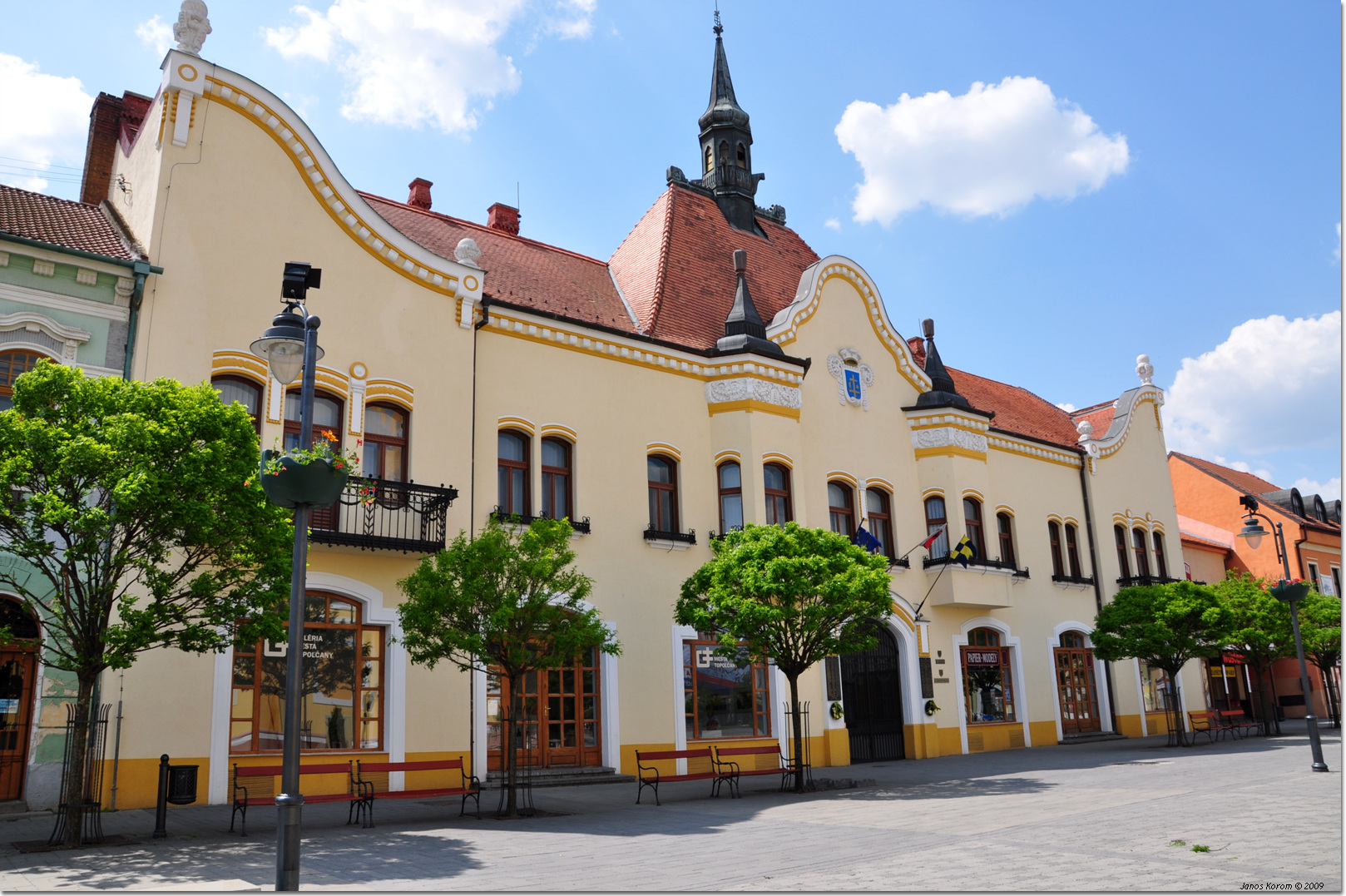
- Town hall in Topoľčany

- Flag Coat of arms

- Location of Topoľčany in the Nitra Region Location of Topoľčany in Slovakia
- Coordinates: 48.55°N 18.18°E
- Country: Slovakia
- Region: Nitra Region
- District: Topoľčany District
- First mentioned: 1173

Government
  - Mayor: JUDr. Alexandra Gieciová

Area
  - Total: 35.88 km^{2} (13.85 sq mi)
- Elevation: 187 m (614 ft)

Population (2025)
  - Total: 23,638
- Time zone: UTC+1 (CET)
  - Summer (DST): UTC+2 (CEST)
- Postal code: 955 01
- Area code: +421 38
- Vehicle registration plate (until 2022): TO
- Website: www.topolcany.sk

Topoľčany ([ˈtɔpɔʎtʂani]; Slovak: Veľké Topoľčany before 1920; Hungarian: Nagytapolcsány) is a town in the Nitra Region of Slovakia. The population is around 25,000 in total.

The Nitra River flows through a wide valley between the two mountain ranges that are visible from the town: Tribeč (to the east) and Považský Inovec (to the west). It is best known for the birthplace of the current prime minister of Slovakia, Robert Fico.

== Geography ==
The municipality lies at an altitude of 187 metres (614 ft) and covers an area of 35.88 km^{2} (13.85 sq mi) (2025).

== Name ==
The name Topoľčany was assumed to be derived from Slovak: topoľ (poplar tree). Groves of these trees were once abundant on the banks of the Nitra River, thus the local settlers got the name *Topoľčane 'those living among poplars'.

The nickname of the town's population is Žochári (singl. Žochár). It derives from the Slovak word žoch, meaning a large sack or bag. It originally referred to day labourers who gathered at the town square during market fairs, available for hire to load and transfer sacks of goods between carts. They would lean against the surrounding buildings, their asking price written on the soles of their shoes.

== History ==
Founded in the 9th century, Topoľčany was a regional market centre during the Middle Ages located on the western bank of the Nitra River and on a crossroads of trade routes.

Topoľčany Castle was built in the 13th century 18 km (11 mi) northwest of the town; this considerable distance was due to the lowland location of Topoľčany. The castle lies on the slopes of Považský Inovec.

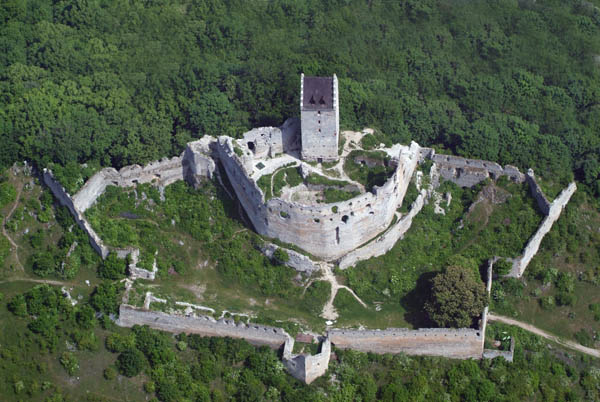
Castle of Topoľčany

During the 12th and 13th centuries, Topoľčany was owned by the Csak family, its best-known member being Matthew III Csák. In the 15th century, the castle was conquered and held by the Hussites for 3 years, who returned it for a fee of 9,000 ducats in 1434. In 1443 the countryside was pillaged by a rogue noble who had captured the castle, but was later evicted by the king and sent to Moravia. In the same year, and again in 1444, the town (and much of Carpathia) was struck by an earthquake.

During the 16th and 17th centuries, there were a few large-scale fires that destroyed substantial parts of the town. Because the town was only 60 km (37 mi) north of the border between the Ottoman Empire and the Habsburg monarchy, Topoľčany was often raided by the Ottoman Turks during the Ottoman wars in Europe, notably in the years 1599 and 1643, when many citizens were taken into slavery. The town's population stagnated as a result. The town's location in a lowland thus proved a disadvantage in times of war as the town never grew big enough to erect city walls.

For most of its history, Topoľčany's population was ethnically mixed. While the rural population was almost purely Slovak, the urban population consisted of Carpathian Germans, Jews, and Magyars. Jews migrated to the town during the 16th–18th centuries. This ethnic mix came to an end in the first part of the 20th century, as industrialization attracted Slovaks from the surrounding areas and the number of Magyars decreased after the creation of Czechoslovakia following World War I.

The Jewish (about 3,200 people) and German populations substantially decreased during World War II. The 550 to 700 Jews from Topoľčany who survived the Holocaust and returned to their homes found themselves strangers in their native town, without property and in many cases without citizenship. Because most of the Jews in Topoľčany spoke Hungarian or German, they had declared their ethnicity in the last pre-war Czechoslovak census as Magyar or German rather than Jewish or Slovak. The Beneš decrees after World War II expelled Hungarian and German speakers, both Jews and Christians. Additionally, most of Topoľčany's pre-war businesses had been owned by Jews, but were taken over by Slovaks during the war. The Jews that survived the war initially tried to stay and rebuild their lives, even after the Topoľčany pogrom of 24 September 1945, but by 1949 all of the remaining Jewish population had emigrated.

== Population ==
Historical population
Year	Pop.	±%
1970	14,720	—
1980	22,413	+52.3%
1991	28,968	+29.2%
2001	28,968	+0.0%
2011	27,177	−6.2%
2021	25,249	−7.1%
Source: Censuses

Topoľčany is predominantly inhabited by Slovaks, with small minorities of Romani and Hungarians. In 2004-05 there were also a number of Czechs and Poles living in the town, as Topoľčany was the host of a joint Slovak-Czech-Polish military operation intended to prepare Slovakia for joining NATO.

The majority of the population is Roman Catholic (there are two churches of this denomination including one on the central square), and there are also a minority of Protestants (one church). The historic synagogue was destroyed by fire during World War II.

Population statistic (10 years)
Year	1995	2005	2015	2025
Count	31,199	28,691	26,196	23,638
Difference		−8.03%	−8.69%	−9.76%

Population statistic
Year	2024	2025
Count	23,985	23,638
Difference		−1.44%

It has a population of 23,638 people (31 December 2025).

=== Ethnicity ===
Census 2021 (1+ %)
Ethnicity	Number	Fraction
Slovak	23,107	91.51%
Not found out	1904	7.54%
Total	25,249	

In year 2021 was 25,249 people by ethnicity 23,107 as Slovak, 1904 as Not found out, 222 as Czech, 85 as Other, 55 as Hungarian, 47 as Romani, 32 as Ukrainian, 30 as Russian, 27 as Vietnamese, 27 as German, 17 as Romanian, 15 as Polish, 13 as Rusyn, 12 as Italian, 12 as Albanian, 8 as Moravian, 7 as Chinese, 6 as Jewish, 5 as Croatian, 5 as Bulgarian, 4 as Turkish, 4 as English, 3 as Canadian, 3 as French, 2 as Irish, 2 as Serbian, 1 as Silesian, 1 as Austrian, 1 as Iranian and 1 as Greek.

Note on population: The difference values of population numbers in the table "Population statistic" and in the sections "Ethnicity" & "Religion" is caused by the use of various statistical methods.

=== Religion ===
Census 2021 (1+ %)
Religion	Number	Fraction
Roman Catholic Church	16,350	64.76%
None	5348	21.18%
Not found out	2370	9.39%
Evangelical Church	540	2.14%
Total	25,249	

In year 2021 was 25,249 people by religion 16,350 from Roman Catholic Church, 5348 from None, 2370 from Not found out, 540 from Evangelical Church, 125 from Greek Catholic Church, 73 from Ad hoc movements, 67 from Christian Congregations in Slovakia, 66 from Other, 48 from Eastern Orthodox Church, 43 from Seventh-day Adventist Church, 38 from Buddhism, 31 from Islam, 29 from Apostolic Church, 27 from Paganism and natural spirituality, 26 from Calvinist Church, 21 from Jehovah's Witnesses, 19 from Other and not ascertained christian church, 6 from Old Catholic Church, 6 from Czechoslovak Hussite Church, 5 from Hinduism, 4 from Jewish community, 4 from United Methodist Church and 3 from Baptists Church.

== Climate ==
Topoľčany has a humid continental climate (Köppen: Dfb).

Climate data for Topoľčany
Month	Jan	Feb	Mar	Apr	May	Jun	Jul	Aug	Sep	Oct	Nov	Dec	Year
Mean daily maximum °C (°F)	1.7 (35.1)	4.7 (40.5)	9.7 (49.5)	15.8 (60.4)	20.1 (68.2)	24.2 (75.6)	26.1 (79.0)	26.0 (78.8)	20.5 (68.9)	14.6 (58.3)	8.2 (46.8)	2.8 (37.0)	14.5 (58.2)
Daily mean °C (°F)	−0.8 (30.6)	1.3 (34.3)	5.2 (41.4)	10.6 (51.1)	15.0 (59.0)	19.0 (66.2)	20.6 (69.1)	20.3 (68.5)	15.4 (59.7)	10.3 (50.5)	5.4 (41.7)	0.6 (33.1)	10.2 (50.4)
Mean daily minimum °C (°F)	−3.4 (25.9)	−1.9 (28.6)	0.9 (33.6)	5.2 (41.4)	9.7 (49.5)	13.5 (56.3)	14.9 (58.8)	14.8 (58.6)	10.7 (51.3)	6.5 (43.7)	2.7 (36.9)	−1.7 (28.9)	6.0 (42.8)
Average precipitation mm (inches)	48.1 (1.89)	45.7 (1.80)	47.6 (1.87)	48.8 (1.92)	87.4 (3.44)	84.1 (3.31)	81.9 (3.22)	81.0 (3.19)	73.3 (2.89)	58.0 (2.28)	54.3 (2.14)	49.4 (1.94)	759.6 (29.89)
Source: Weather.Directory

== Sights ==
A large army barracks, airfield and heliport are located in the town; during the Communist era there were about 2,000 troops stationed in the town. The surrounding forests are full of abandoned bunkers.

== Industry ==
There are four main industries in Topoľčany: the Topvar brewery (owned by SABMiller), kitchen furniture producer Decodom, cableware producer SEWS (owned by a Japanese company), and the clothing company Ozeta (producer of suits and jackets). The large "ZTS" factory, a heavy machinery producer in neighboring Tovarníky, is no longer a major employer.

== Education ==
The educational infrastructure is made up of kindergartens, elementary schools, high schools (both general and specialised) and formerly a branch of a Bratislava-based university. However, most of the town's young people go to Nitra, Bratislava, or Trnava for higher education.

== Sport ==
Slovak Bandy Association, founded in 2017, is organising and rink bandy sessions in various localities, for example Topoľčany. HK agro Topolčany is a handball club from the city that currently plays in the Slovenská hadzanárska extraliga, the highest level of handball in Slovakia.

== Twin towns – sister cities ==
Topoľčany is twinned with:

- Luhačovice, Czech Republic
- Prilep, North Macedonia
- Jászberény, Hungary
- Küçükçekmece, Turkey
- Rybnik, Poland
- Artern, Germany
- Mazingarbe, France

== Notable residents ==
- Henni Racik (born 1964), founder and creator of Velvet Evolution Universe Tour
- Mário Breška (born 1979), football player
- Robert J Büchler (1929–2009), historian and peace activist, escapee from Buchenwald
- Zuzana Dolinková (born 1983), politician
- Denisa Dvončova, model
- Robert Fico (born 1964), politician and current prime minister of Slovakia
- Miroslav Siva (born 1961), footballer
- Rudolf Sivák (born 1955), rector of Bratislava University of Economics
- Miroslav Šatan (born 1974), ice hockey player
- Viera Schottertova (born 1982), model
- Ľubomír Višňovský (born 1976), ice hockey player
- Rudolf Vrba (1924–2006), professor and escapee from Auschwitz
- Tereza Mihalikova (born 1998), tennis player, 2015 Australian Open girls champion
- Peter Zaťko (1983), wheelchair curler
