= Viera Schottertova =

Slovak model (born 1982)

- Born: Viera Schottertova
- Children: 3
- Modelling information
- Height: 1.75 m (5 ft 9 in)
- Hair colour: Brown
- Eye colour: Blue

Viera Schottertova is a Slovak model.

== Biography ==
=== Early life ===
She was actively involved in dancing as a child, and anticipated a career in ballet before her unique looks decided otherwise.

=== Career ===
Schottertova moved to Vienna after participating in the Elite Model Look Contest. From there her international career quickly took off and she featured on covers and editorials for magazines such as Elle, Marie Claire, DS, Vogue and major advertising campaigns for Armani, Bernd Berger, Bolero, Chanel cosmetics, Custo Barcelona, Gant, Horizons, Lou lingerie, Mango, Marc Cain, Olivier Strelli, Red Point, Rimmel, Tag woman, TaiFun, Trixi Schober, Walter Leder, Women's Secret, Yera. She has also appeared in Victoria's Secret catalogs.

=== Personal life ===
Schottertova first married when she was 17 and had a son, Loren. Subsequently, she was married to an Ivorian diplomat Souleyman Domumoya, with whom she lived in Corona, New York and had a daughter Gabriela. In 2015, she returned to Topoľčany, desiring quieter living environment to raise children. In 2019, she announced the birth of her second son, Marián on Instagram.
