= Tematín =

Historic site in Slovakia

Tematín Castle
- Hrádok, Slovakia
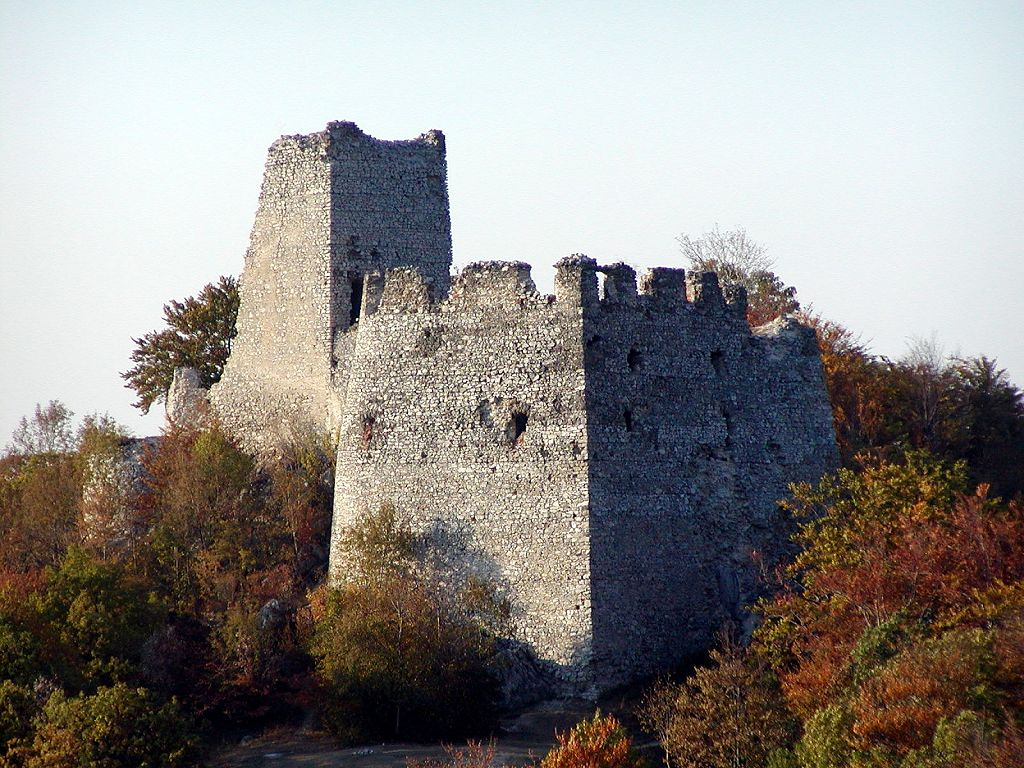
- View on the castle ruins from the south.

Site information
- Condition: Ruined

Location
- Location in Slovakia
- Coordinates: 48.677222°N 17.929167°E

Site history
- Built: 1240s
- Materials: Limestone
- Demolished: 1710

Tematín Castle is a castle ruin in western Slovakia.

== History ==
The castle was originally built in the second half of the 13th century in the Kingdom of Hungary. It was completely reconstructed by the Thurzó family, owners of the castle from 1524. The last owner was Miklós Bercsényi, general of the anti-Habsburg insurrection army during Rákóczi's War of Independence. The castle fell into ruins after it was besieged in 1710 as a part of the suppression of the anti-Habsburg uprising.

A trove of axe-shaped iron coins from the Great Moravian period was found in the Hrádok area. Traces of the Great Moravian fortified settlement found in the village were destroyed by construction activities.

== Conservation ==
Today there is a Tematin castle non-profit organization (OZ Hrad Tematin) composed of university students. They work on conservation projects, conduct archaeological research and other historical-architectural research and other activities for castle preservation as well as making the site attractive for visitors.

== See also ==
- List of castles in Slovakia
