= Martin Medňanský =

Slovak Catholic priest

Martin Medňanský pseudonyms Dušan Sava Pepkin, Divinkov Svedernický, Martin Divinko Svedernicý, M.M. (Hungarian: Mednyánszky Márton; 10 November 1840 – 15 November 1891) was a Slovak Catholic priest, a poet and a publicist in the Kingdom of Hungary.

== Life ==
Medňanský came from an old noble family from Medné. He was born on 10 November 1840 in Malá Divina (now Divinka) as the second of the eight children of his father Ľudovít and mother Jozefa née Nozdrovická. He had studied at the local village school, then at Piarist grammar schools in Trenčín and Nitra. In Trenčín, he had several Czech professors that potentially influenced his views on the Czech-Slovak question. In Nitra, he studied theology and was a member of a Slovak educational society called Slovak School. After the abolishment of the society by the church hierarchy, he continued together with other students in private studies in Slovak.

On 24 September 1864, he was ordained as a priest. His early ministry was spent in parishes in Lietava, Vysoká nad Kysucou, Bošáca and Zliechov. In 1869, he became a priest in Beckov where he spent the rest of his career. In 1891, he resigned because of illness and moved to Istebník (now a part of Trenčín) where he became known as a successful fruiterer and a vintner. He died on 15 November 1891 in Istebník.

== Work ==
Medňanský published his works in several Slovak journals, calendars and almanachs (Slovenské pohľady, Slovenský letopis, Slovenský kalendár, Slovenskosť, Slovenský Sion, Národnie noviny, Katolícke noviny, Obzor, Orol, Sokol, Tovaryštvo, Pútnik svätoštefanský /the editor in 1882 - 1885/). He also published works in Czech journals (Obzor, Vlast, Pozor, Posvátná kazatelna), Polish journal Ruch literacki and in the press of Slovak Americans (Jednota). He also translated from French, German, Hungarian and Polish. Although his poetry was later published in two volume work Poesie Dušana Savy Pepkina, he was more recognized as the author of prose.

== Other activities ==
Medňanský was a member of numerous Slovak-affiliated philanthropic and patriotic societies (Radhošť, Muzálna slovenská spoločnosť, Dedičstvo sv. Cyrila a Metoda, Spolok svätého Vojtecha). As a nobleman, he was proud of his Slovak origin and tried to demonstrate that this is not in the conflict with his privileged position. He was a co-organiser of collection for Museum in Martin, donated his library to Ľudovít Vladimír Rizner (one of founders of Slovak bibliography) and performed several similar cultural and national aware activities.

== Sources ==
- Velička, Vladimír (2015). "Orol tatrsanský - Martin Medňanský z Medného, kňaz, básnik a publicista". In Bôbová, Mária (ed.). Šľachta stredného Slovenska a jej vplyv na kultúrny rozvoj regiónu (in Slovak). Banská Bystrica: Štátna vedecká knižnica v Banskej Bystrici: Katedra histórie Filozofickej fakulty Univerzity Mateja Bela v Banskej Bystrici. ISBN 9788089388677.
