= Ján Dechet =

Slovak Roman Catholic priest (1908–1968)

Ján Dechet (28 June 1908 in Radošina – 10 June 1968 in Bratislava) was a Slovak Roman Catholic priest. As one of the left-wing nationalist "patriotic priests" who supported the Communist Party of Czechoslovakia, Dechet was appointed the bishop of Banská Bystrica by the Communist authorities in 1950, after the death of the previous bishop Andrej Škrábik. Dechet's appointment was caused by the Communist authorities forcing out the official successor of Škrábik out of office, as the Vatican failed to meet the government's demand to consult clerical appointments with the Communist authorities beforehand. Initially, the Vatican refused to recognize Dechet and he was excommunicated by the Holy See in 1950 . His excommunication was subsequently lifted in 1951, and his position was recognized by the Holy See. The Church started respecting the Communist government's demands afterwards.

== History ==
Starting in 1949, the Communist government of Slovakia sought to develop ties with the local Catholic clergy and gain their support. A considerable part of the Slovak clergy supported the Communists, influenced by left-wing nationalism which gave the pro-Communist priest the moniker of "patriotic priests". This tendency was mainly represented by Catholic priests such as Alexander Horák and Jozef Lukačovič. The "patriotic priests" were considered politically reliable, supportive of the Communist regime, and were entrusted with positions of administrative authority. Ján Dechet was also considered one of the "patriotic priests".

In 1950, the Slovak Presidium increased the state salaries of Slovak clergy by about two-thirds, and introduced obligatory vow of allegiance where the clergy was to affirm their loyalty to the Communist authorities. Despite the Vatican instructing the Slovak priests against taking the oath, 2,280 clergy were summoned, 2216 out of 2280 Slovak Catholic priests (97%) took the oath. A prominent Slovak Communist, Gustáv Husák, wrote that the policy of encouraging progressive clergy was a definite success: "Despite the instructions of the Catholic bishops, the majority of the clergy did not make any oral or written reservations about the vows wording… On the whole, it can be said that the uniform composition and signing of the vow is a complete defeat of the episcopal agitation against the vow, or for the vow with written reservations, as well as ordered in the pastoral letter in November."

Subsequently, Slovak authorities implemented a law according to which clerical appointments would need to be approved by the state. However, the Catholic Church initially ignored it - when the bishop of Banská Bystrica, Andrej Škrábik, died on 8 January 1950, the former General Vicar, Daniel Briedoň, announced his appointment without seeking state consent. The Slovak authorities refused to accept Briedoň's appointment, and forced him to resign in February. After consulting the local progressive clergy, the government offered the office to Dechet, who accepted the position of "state administrator" of the Banská Bystrica diocese on 13 February 1950.

Dechet was then excommunicated from the Catholic Church, which was announced on Radio Vatican. Slovak bishops also issued a pastoral letter in which they refused to accept Dechet's appointment. In order to prevent Dechet from giving in to pressure and resigning, Slovak authorities organized a massive campaign in his support, organizing a delegation of workers from Podbrezová, which expressed its support of Dechet. Additionally, Slovak Communists appointed two other pro-Communist priests to Dechet to act as chancellor and secretary of the diocese, and assigned him extensive state protection.

Ultimately, local Catholics accepted Dechet, and fellow clergymen defended his appointment. Reporting on the situation, Husák wrote in March: "The event in Banská Bystrica was quite successful […] We managed to concentrate a considerable number of clergy, no longer on a meeting, but on an active speech against the Vatican, thus hitting the Vatican’s efforts to isolate Dechet. The situation of Dechet has been consolidated and the progressive priests strengthened."

Dechet performed his functions despite the excommunication, and was also elected the Capitular Vicar in 1951. This proved to be a considerable issue to the Catholic structures in Slovakia, as per ecclesiastical law, all Dechet's decisions were invalid. In order to solve the situation, the bishop of Nitra, Eduard Nécsey, validated all of Dechet's decisions. Vatican relented, and in early 1951 his excommunication was lifted by the Bishop of Trnava, Ambróz Lazík.

The incident improved the relationship between the Catholic Church and the Communist authorities of Czechoslovakia. The Church became more willing to cooperate with the state, while the Communists became "more careful about choosing an acceptable vicar capitular in advance". After Vatican II, the Communist government formed two official Catholic associations for pro-communist Catholic priests, first The Peace Movement of Catholic Clergy and later The Association of Catholic Clergy Pacem in Terris. About one-third of Czechoslovak priests joined these movements.

In 1955, Dechet received the Czechoslovak Order of the Republic. He died in 1968.

== See also ==
- Catholicism and socialism
