= Tovarníky =

Tovarníky Tavarnok
- Municipality
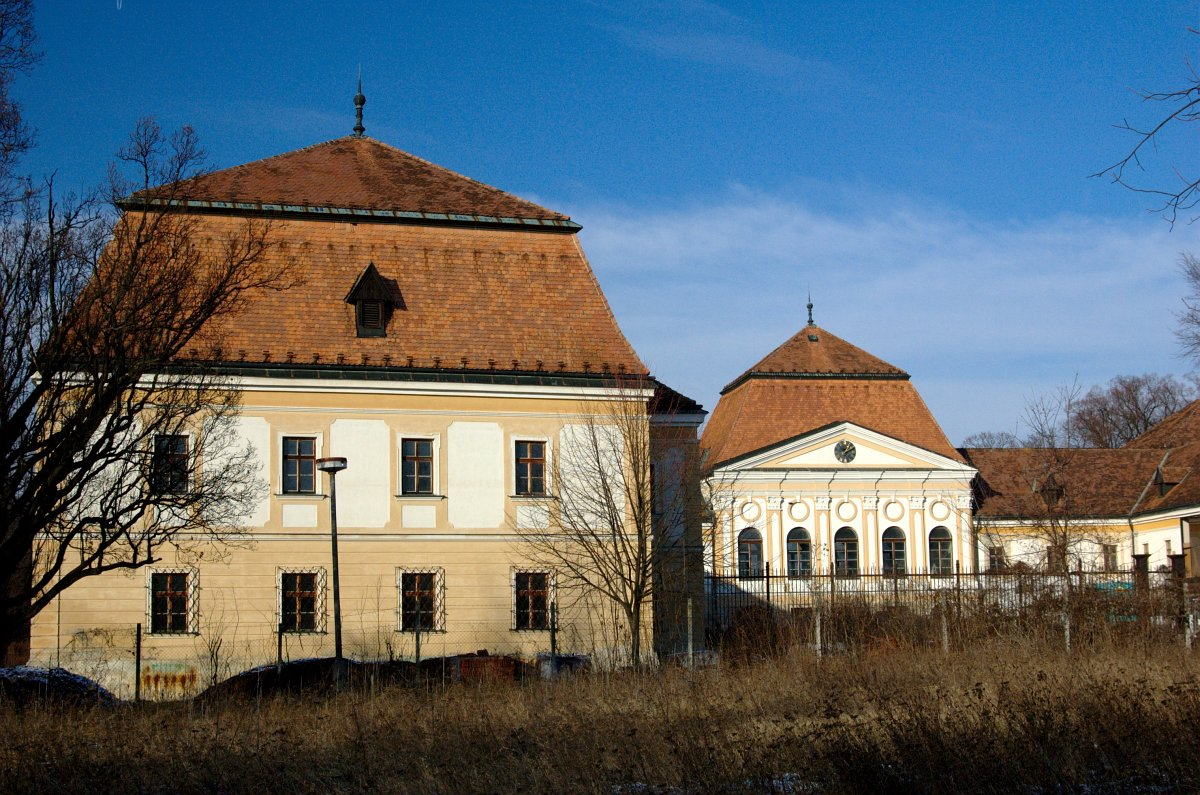
- Manor house in Tovarníky

- Location of Tovarníky in the Nitra Region Location of Tovarníky in Slovakia
- Coordinates: 48.57°N 18.15°E
- Country: Slovakia
- Region: Nitra Region
- District: Topoľčany District
- First mentioned: 1172

Government
  - Mayor: Miroslav Ďurák

Area
  - Total: 5.41 km^{2} (2.09 sq mi)
- Elevation: 189 m (620 ft)

Population (2025)
  - Total: 1,559
- Time zone: UTC+1 (CET)
  - Summer (DST): UTC+2 (CEST)
- Postal code: 955 01
- Area code: +421 38
- Vehicle registration plate (until 2022): TO
- Website: www.tovarniky.eu

Tovarníky (Hungarian: Tavarnok) is a municipality in the Topoľčany District of the Nitra Region, Slovakia. Formerly, it was a part of Topoľčany, later the village became independent.

== Geography ==
The municipality lies at an altitude of 189 metres (620 ft) and covers an area of 5.41 km^{2} (2.09 sq mi) (2025).

== History ==
The village of Tovarníky is historically documented in the years 1172 - 1196. It belonged to the monastery of Zobor, from 1272 as Taarnuk Ab, later to the manor of Topoľčany. In 1600 - 1610 a manor house was built in this village, whose last owner before nationalization was the Stummer family. After the demise of Topoľčany Castle at the beginning of the 17th century, the administration of the Topoľčany manor was moved to Tovarník. In 1833-34 a sugar factory was built. In 1869, the Stummers built a new sugar factory here, which worked until 1929 when it burnt down. There were two mills in the village, also a brewery (founded in 1866), a distillery (1865) and two lighthouses. In the past the village was annexed to Topoľčany, now it is again an independent village.

== Population ==
Population statistic (10 years)
Year	1995	2005	2015	2025
Count	1238	1334	1450	1559
Difference		+7.75%	+8.69%	+7.51%

Population statistic
Year	2024	2025
Count	1540	1559
Difference		+1.23%

It has a population of 1559 people (31 December 2025).

=== Ethnicity ===
Census 2021 (1+ %)
Ethnicity	Number	Fraction
Slovak	1404	94.35%
Not found out	81	5.44%
Total	1488	

In year 2021 was 1488 people by ethnicity 1404 as Slovak, 81 as Not found out, 8 as Czech, 3 as Rusyn, 3 as Other, 2 as Romani, 2 as Russian, 2 as Hungarian, 1 as Italian and 1 as Austrian.

Note on population: The difference values of population numbers in the table "Population statistic" and in the sections "Ethnicity" & "Religion" is caused by the use of various statistical methods.

=== Religion ===
Census 2021 (1+ %)
Religion	Number	Fraction
Roman Catholic Church	1053	70.77%
None	304	20.43%
Not found out	73	4.91%
Evangelical Church	29	1.95%
Total	1488	

In year 2021 was 1488 people by religion 1053 from Roman Catholic Church, 304 from None, 73 from Not found out, 29 from Evangelical Church, 7 from Greek Catholic Church, 6 from Jehovah's Witnesses, 4 from Ad hoc movements, 3 from Christian Congregations in Slovakia, 3 from Other, 2 from Other and not ascertained christian church, 2 from Islam, 1 from Eastern Orthodox Church and 1 from Paganism and natural spirituality.
