= Radošina =

Radošina Radosna
- Municipality
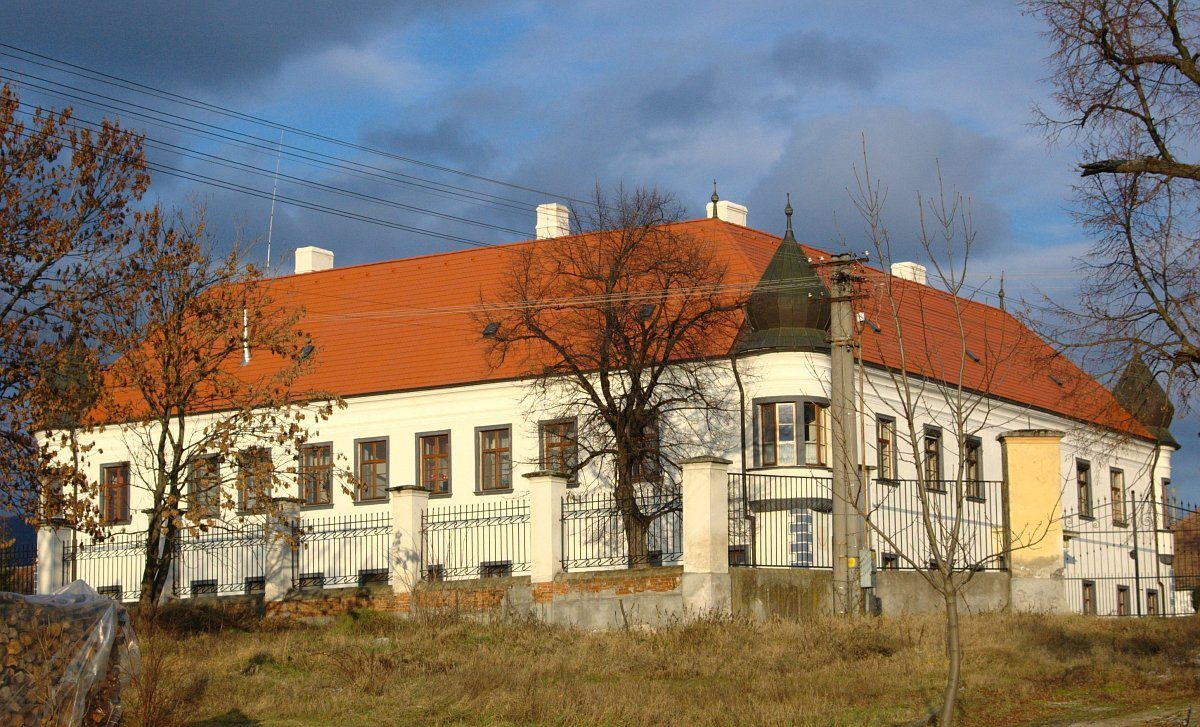
- Manor house in Radošina

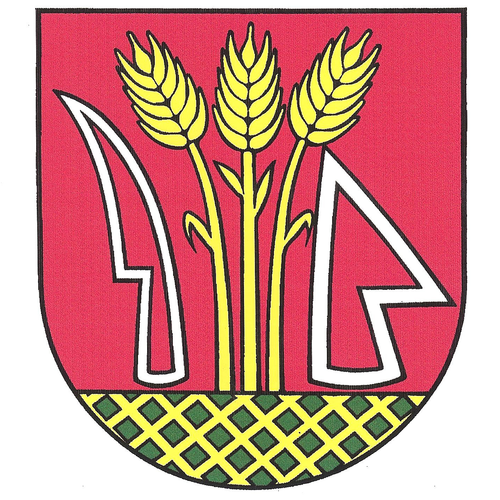
- Flag Coat of arms

- Location of Radošina in the Nitra Region Location of Radošina in Slovakia
- Coordinates: 48.55°N 17.93°E
- Country: Slovakia
- Region: Nitra Region
- District: Topoľčany District
- First mentioned: 1277

Area
  - Total: 27.66 km^{2} (10.68 sq mi)
- Elevation: 192 m (630 ft)

Population (2025)
  - Total: 1,847
- Time zone: UTC+1 (CET)
  - Summer (DST): UTC+2 (CEST)
- Postal code: 956 05
- Area code: +421 38
- Vehicle registration plate (until 2022): TO
- Website: www.radosina.sk

Radošina (Hungarian: Radosna) is a municipality in the Topoľčany District of the Nitra Region, Slovakia. In 2011 it had 2013 inhabitants.

It is located in the southwestern part of Topoľčany district, on the border mountains Interesting Routes Nitra and downs. The village lies at 216 m above sea level, the cadastral territory covers an area of 2767 ha and has over two thousand inhabitants.

The area of Radošina was inhabited during the Middle Paleolithic, as evidenced by the findings in the cave called Devil's Furnace.

Radošina was created to communicate a very exposed location in the district is already in the early Middle Ages cruised important long-distance routes.

The village's name probably comes from the river, which was first mentioned in a deed of Nitra Alphonsus Vincent from 1249 as Radusna. Over the 13th century, Radošina grew into a quite populous village. In the third 14th century it belonged to the Bishopric of Nitra. In the mid-16th century, Radošina is mentioned as a town - oppidum.

In the administrative area Radošina are many important cultural landmarks. Radošina is known as a wine region; the origins of viticulture here date back to the 15th century. In the 19th century, a breeding and seed station began. The excellent results achieved in breeding barley and vines, known as Radošinský Klevner was first planted in 1921. This wine was even served at the wedding of Queen Elizabeth and the English still belongs to one of the most popular brands of wines.

In this region there is a major water source that supplies drinking water to surrounding areas.

== Geography ==
The municipality lies at an altitude of 192 metres (630 ft) and covers an area of 27.66 km^{2} (10.68 sq mi) (2025).

== Population ==
Population statistic (10 years)
Year	1995	2005	2015	2025
Count	2038	1981	1956	1847
Difference		−2.79%	−1.26%	−5.57%

Population statistic
Year	2024	2025
Count	1855	1847
Difference		−0.43%

It has a population of 1847 people (31 December 2025).

=== Ethnicity ===
Census 2021 (1+ %)
Ethnicity	Number	Fraction
Slovak	1773	93.85%
Not found out	112	5.92%
Total	1889	

In year 2021 was 1889 people by ethnicity 1773 as Slovak, 112 as Not found out, 16 as Czech, 5 as Hungarian, 4 as German, 4 as English, 2 as Romani, 2 as Russian, 1 as Jewish, 1 as Italian and 1 as Serbian.

Note on population: The difference values of population numbers in the table "Population statistic" and in the sections "Ethnicity" & "Religion" is caused by the use of various statistical methods.

=== Religion ===
Census 2021 (1+ %)
Religion	Number	Fraction
Roman Catholic Church	1462	77.4%
None	234	12.39%
Not found out	110	5.82%
Evangelical Church	40	2.12%
Total	1889	

In year 2021 was 1889 people by religion 1462 from Roman Catholic Church, 234 from None, 110 from Not found out, 40 from Evangelical Church, 10 from Jehovah's Witnesses, 10 from Greek Catholic Church, 7 from Ad hoc movements, 2 from Paganism and natural spirituality, 2 from Other and not ascertained christian church, 2 from Christian Congregations in Slovakia, 2 from Buddhism, 1 from Old Catholic Church, 1 from Calvinist Church, 1 from Eastern Orthodox Church, 1 from Islam, 1 from Other, 1 from United Methodist Church, 1 from Czechoslovak Hussite Church and 1 from Seventh-day Adventist Church.

== Notable people ==
- Ján Dechet - priest
- Katarína Kolníková - actress
