= Lubotyń, Opole Voivodeship =

Lubotyń
- Village
- Location within Poland
- Coordinates: 50°3′N 17°56′E
- Country: Poland
- Voivodeship: Opole
- County: Głubczyce
- Gmina: Kietrz
- Population: 459 (2,007)

Lubotyń [luˈbɔtɨɲ] is a village in the administrative district of Gmina Kietrz, within Głubczyce County, Opole Voivodeship, in south-western Poland, close to the Czech border.
