= Hrádok =

- Municipality
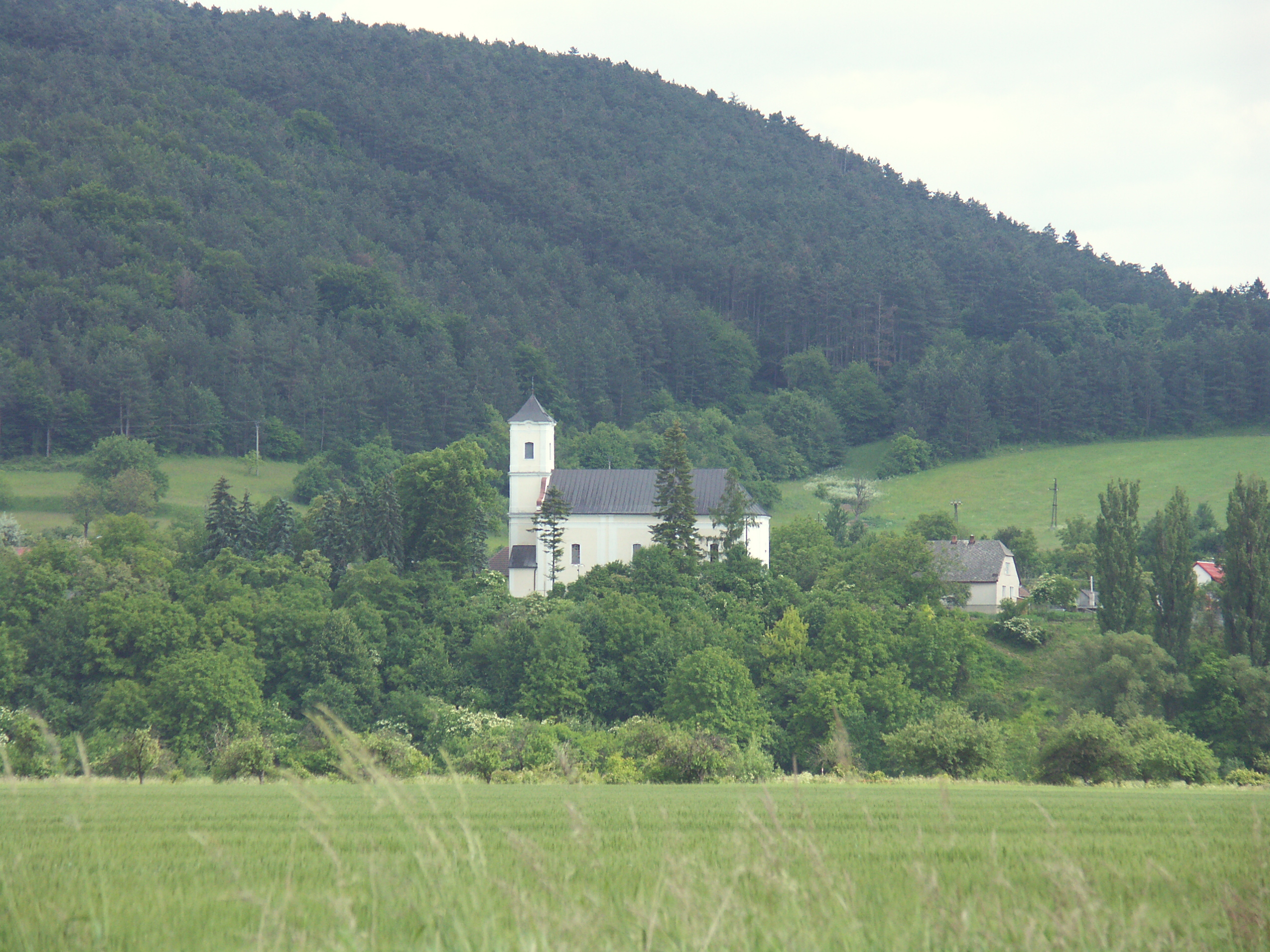

- Flag

- Location of Hrádok in the Trenčín Region Location of Hrádok in Slovakia
- Coordinates: 48.70°N 17.88°E
- Country: Slovakia
- Region: Trenčín Region
- District: Nové Mesto nad Váhom District
- First mentioned: 1426

Area
  - Total: 24.13 km^{2} (9.32 sq mi)
- Elevation: 196 m (643 ft)

Population (2025)
  - Total: 785
- Time zone: UTC+1 (CET)
  - Summer (DST): UTC+2 (CEST)
- Postal code: 916 33
- Area code: +421 32
- Vehicle registration plate (until 2022): NM
- Website: www.obec-hradok.sk

Hrádok (Hungarian: Temetvény) is a village and municipality in Nové Mesto nad Váhom District in the Trenčín Region of western Slovakia.

== History ==
In historical records the village was first mentioned in 1246. Before the establishment of independent Czechoslovakia in 1918, Hrádok was part of Nyitra County within the Kingdom of Hungary. From 1939 to 1945, it was part of the Slovak Republic.

== Geography ==
The municipality lies at an altitude of 196 metres (643 ft) and covers an area of 24.13 km^{2} (9.32 sq mi) (2025).

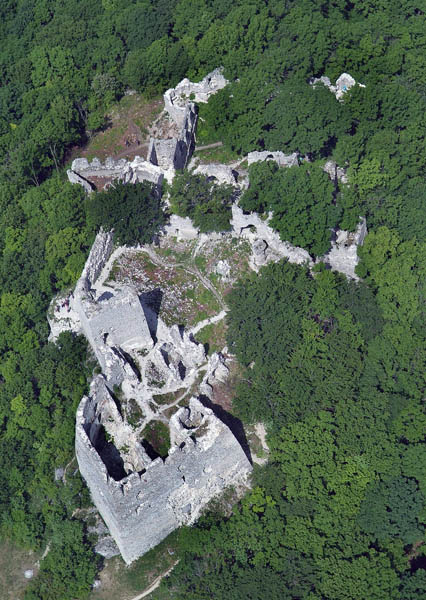
Aerial photography of the Castle

== Population ==
Population statistic (10 years)
Year	1995	2005	2015	2025
Count	638	589	730	785
Difference		−7.68%	+23.93%	+7.53%

Population statistic
Year	2024	2025
Count	784	785
Difference		+0.12%

It has a population of 785 people (31 December 2025).

=== Ethnicity ===
Census 2021 (1+ %)
Ethnicity	Number	Fraction
Slovak	718	97.42%
Not found out	16	2.17%
Total	737	

In year 2021 was 737 people by ethnicity 718 as Slovak, 16 as Not found out, 4 as Czech, 1 as Russian, 1 as Austrian, 1 as Hungarian and 1 as Other.

Note on population: The difference values of population numbers in the table "Population statistic" and in the sections "Ethnicity" & "Religion" is caused by the use of various statistical methods.

=== Religion ===
Census 2021 (1+ %)
Religion	Number	Fraction
Roman Catholic Church	437	59.29%
None	134	18.18%
Evangelical Church	103	13.98%
Not found out	54	7.33%
Total	737	

In year 2021 was 737 people by religion 437 from Roman Catholic Church, 134 from None, 103 from Evangelical Church, 54 from Not found out, 6 from Greek Catholic Church, 1 from Other, 1 from United Methodist Church and 1 from Buddhism.

== Genealogical resources ==
The records for genealogical research are available at the state archive "Statny Archiv in Bratislava, Slovakia"

- Roman Catholic church records (births/marriages/deaths): 1719–1907 (parish A)
- Lutheran church records (births/marriages/deaths): 1660–1895 (parish B)

== See also ==
- List of municipalities and towns in Slovakia
