= Ľubotín =

- Municipality
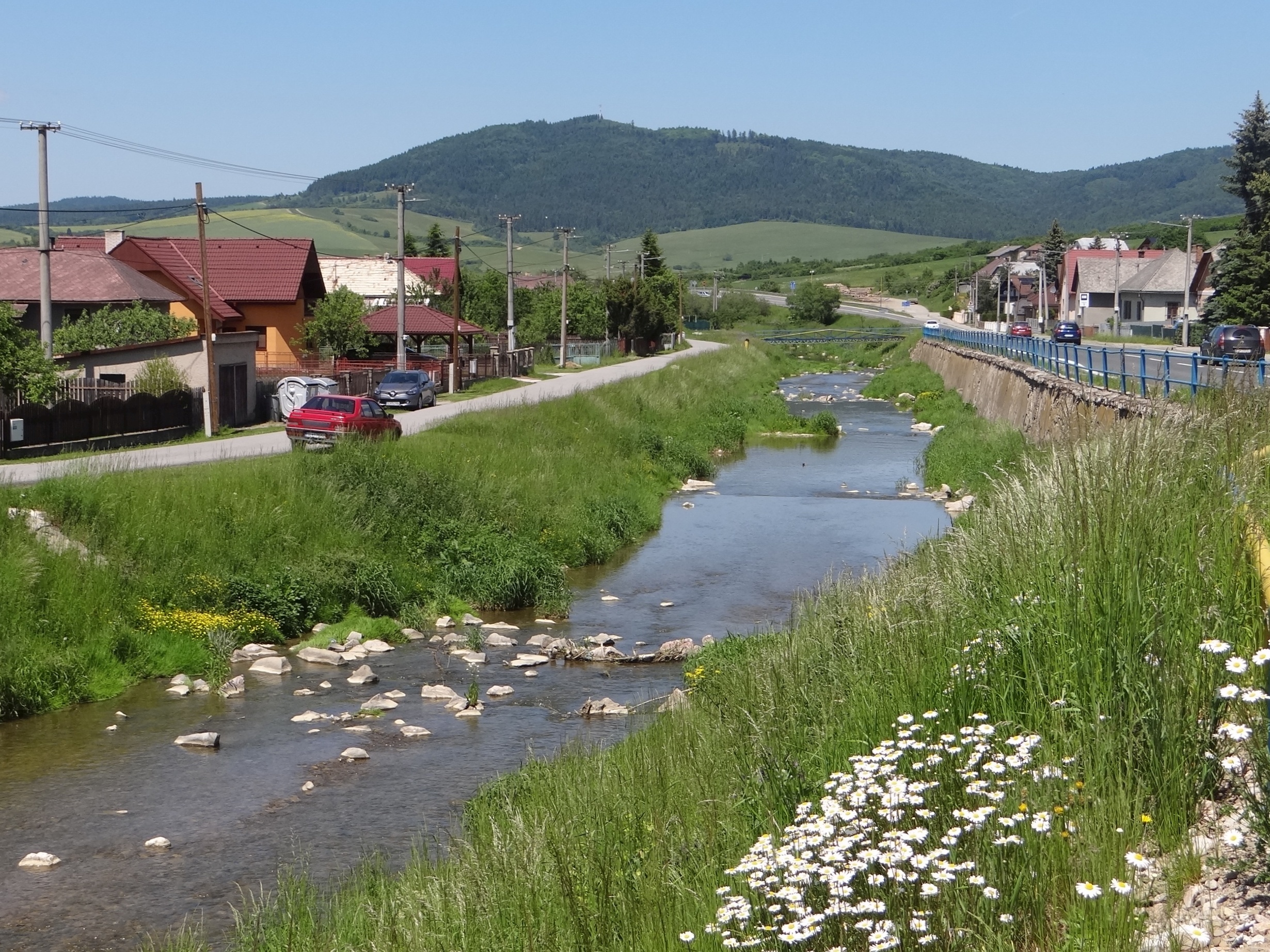

- Flag

- Location of Ľubotín in the Prešov Region Location of Ľubotín in Slovakia
- Coordinates: 49.26°N 20.88°E
- Country: Slovakia
- Region: Prešov Region
- District: Stará Ľubovňa District
- First mentioned: 1330

Area
  - Total: 10.86 km^{2} (4.19 sq mi)
- Elevation: 492 m (1,614 ft)

Population (2025)
  - Total: 1,300
- Time zone: UTC+1 (CET)
  - Summer (DST): UTC+2 (CEST)
- Postal code: 654 1
- Area code: +421 52
- Vehicle registration plate (until 2022): SL
- Website: www.lubotin.sk

Ľubotín (Hungarian: Lubotény; Rusyn: Люботин) is a village and municipality in Stará Ľubovňa District in the Prešov Region of northern Slovakia.

== History ==
In historical records the village was mentioned for the first time in 1330. The oldest record comes from a priest Štefan de Lubentin from the year 1330. It is thought that Ľubotín belongs to the oldest Slovak villages, already existing in the 11th century. The coat-of-arms of the village (Madonna with baby Jesus) was firstly used in the first half of 14th century. The hundredth anniversary of the church's consecration was celebrated on 6 November 2007 at the presence of Alojz Tkáč, the archbishop of Košice. Before the establishment of independent Czechoslovakia in 1918, Ľubotín was part of Sáros County within the Kingdom of Hungary. From 1939 to 1945, it was part of the Slovak Republic. On 22 January 1945, the Red Army dislodged the Wehrmacht from Ľubotín and it was once again part of Czechoslovakia.

== Monuments ==
The sacral monument is church dedicated to name of Virgin Mary form year 1905 (Roman Catholic) - one boat with superiored tower. The church is an imitation of Romanesque style.

=== Interior of church ===
In the interior of church is a boat on the facade with altar. There is a picture of Saint Mary standing on snake's head. On the sides there are statues connected with a motive of picture. On the right side there is statue of St. Jozef with Jesus on arms. On the left side there is St. Ann (mother of virgin Mary) with small Mary. The pride of the church is the choir with historical pipe one-manual organ from year 1906.

=== Exterior of church ===
In the exterior of church over the entrance on the sides, in the niches there are renovationed statues of St. Cyril and Metod.

== Geography ==
The municipality lies at an altitude of 492 metres (1,614 ft) and covers an area of 10.86 km^{2} (4.19 sq mi) (2025).

== Population ==
Population statistic (10 years)
Year	1995	2005	2015	2025
Count	1296	1357	1350	1300
Difference		+4.70%	−0.51%	−3.70%

Population statistic
Year	2024	2025
Count	1308	1300
Difference		−0.61%

It has a population of 1300 people (31 December 2025).

=== Ethnicity ===
Census 2021 (1+ %)
Ethnicity	Number	Fraction
Slovak	1203	91.2%
Rusyn	73	5.53%
Not found out	68	5.15%
Romani	40	3.03%
Total	1319	

In year 2021 was 1319 people by ethnicity 1203 as Slovak, 73 as Rusyn, 68 as Not found out, 40 as Romani, 4 as Other, 2 as German, 1 as Czech, 1 as Ukrainian, 1 as Polish and 1 as Moravian.

Note on population: The difference values of population numbers in the table "Population statistic" and in the sections "Ethnicity" & "Religion" is caused by the use of various statistical methods.

=== Religion ===
Census 2021 (1+ %)
Religion	Number	Fraction
Roman Catholic Church	1035	78.47%
Greek Catholic Church	176	13.34%
Not found out	65	4.93%
None	27	2.05%
Total	1319	

In year 2021 was 1319 people by religion 1035 from Roman Catholic Church, 176 from Greek Catholic Church, 65 from Not found out, 27 from None, 7 from Apostolic Church, 3 from Eastern Orthodox Church, 3 from Evangelical Church, 1 from Paganism and natural spirituality, 1 from Christian Congregations in Slovakia and 1 from Other.
