= Cothenius Medal awardees, 1864–1953 =

Awards given by the German National Academy of Sciences Leopoldina

Leopoldina Cothenius Medal
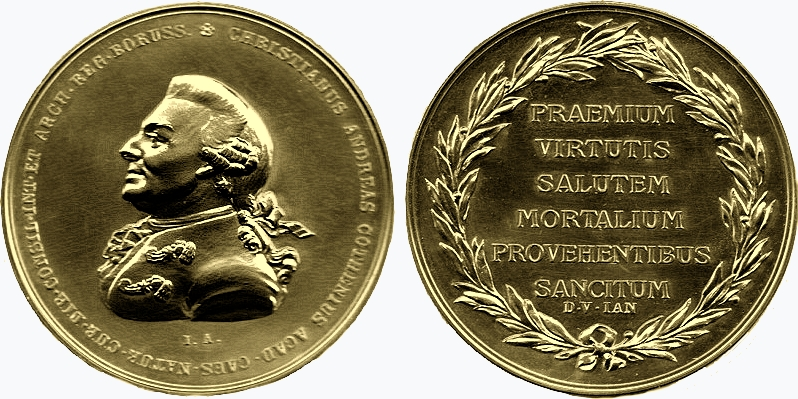
- The Cothenius medal
- Awarded for: Outstanding research in any branch of science
- Sponsored by: German National Academy of Sciences Leopoldina
- Country: Germany
- First award: 1792; 234 years ago
- Website: Cothenius Medal

Cothenius Medal awardees, 1864–1953 is a list of Cothenius Medal awardees for the period between 1864 and 1953.

== List of Laureates ==
Year	Image	Laureate	Discipline	City	Ref
1953		Karl-Wilhelm Jötten (1886–1958)	Hygiene	Münster	
1944		Hans Winkler (1877–1945)	Botany	Hamburg	
1943		Otto Hahn (1878–1968)	Chemistry		
1942		Hermann Rein (1898–1968)	Physiology	Göttingen	
1941		Georg Sticker (1860–1960)	History of medicine	Würzburg	
1939		Alfred Vogt (1879–1943)	Ophthalmology	Zürich	
1938		Erich Tschermak von Seysenegg (1871–1962)	Agricultural sciences	Vienna	
1937		Armin Tschermak von Seysenegg (1870–1952)	Physiology	Prague	
1937		Dante De Blasi (1873–1956)	Hygiene	Rome	
1937		Eugen Fischer (1874–1967)	Anthropology		
1937		Franz Volhard (1872–1950)	Internal Medicine	Frankfurt	
1937		George Barger (1878–1938)	Biochemistry	Edinburgh	
1937		Max Le Blanc (1865–1943)	Physical Chemistry	Leipzig	
1937		Paul Uhlenhuth (1870–1957)	Hygiene	Freiburg	
1937		Richard Kuhn (1900–1957)	Chemistry	Heidelberg	
1937		Robert von Ostertag (1864–1940)	Veterinary Medicine	Tübingen	
1935		Hans Spemann (1869–1941)	Zoology	Freiburg	
1935		Otfrid Foerster (1873–1941)	Neurology	Breslau	
1934		Johannes Weigelt (1890–1948)	Geology/Paleontology		
1925		Albrecht Penck (1858–1945)	Geography	Berlin	
1925		Hugo Eckener (1868–1954)	Physics	Friedrichshafen	
1925		Sven Hedin (1865–1952)	Geography/Ethnology		
1922		Albert Wangerin (1844–1933)	Mathematics	Halle	
1916		Wilhelm von Waldeyer-Hartz (1836–1921)	Anatomy	Berlin	
1914		Emil Abderhalden (1877–1950)	Physiology		
1913		Leonhard Schultze-Jena (1872–1955)	Geography	Marburg	
1912		Robert Tigerstedt (1853–1923)	Physiology	Helsinki	
1911		Carl Chun (1852–1914)	Zoology	Leipzig	
1910		Wilhelm Pfeffer (1845–1920)	Botany	Leipzig	
1909		Viktor Uhlig (1857–1911)	Geology	Vienna	
1908		Daniel Vorländer (1867–1911)	Chemistry	Halle	
1907		Wilhelm von Bezold (1837–1907)	Meteorology	Berlin	
1906		David Hilbert (1862–1943)	Mathematics	Göttingen	
1906		Georg von Neumayer (1826–1909)	Geophysics	Neustadt, Hardt	
1905		Ernst Viktor von Leyden (1832–1910)	Internal Medicine	Berlin	
1904		Alexander Supan (1847–1920)	Geography	Gotha	
1903		Ivan Petrovic Pavlov (1849–1936)	Physiology	St. Petersburg	
1901		Carl Gegenbaur (1826–1903)	Anatomy	Heidelberg	
1901		Rudolf Virchow (1821–1902)	Anatomy	Berlin	
1900		Joseph Dalton Hooker (1817–1911)	Botany	London	
1899		Ferdinand Zirkel (1838–1912)	Mineralogy	Leipzig	
1898		Emil Fischer (1852–1919)	Chemistry	Berlin	
1897		Albert von Kölliker (1817–1905)	Anatomy	Würzburg	
1897		Georg Quincke (1834–1924)	Physics	Heidelberg	
1896		Robert von Sterneck (1839–1910)	Geodesy	Vienna	
1895		Alphonse Laveran (1845–1922)	Tropical medicine	Paris	
1895		Heinrich Ernst Beyrich (1845–1896)	Geology	Berlin	
1894		Hanns Bruno Geinitz (1814–1900)	Geology	Dresden	
1894		Karl von den Steinen (1855–1929)	Ethnology	Neubabelsberg	
1893		Adolf Eugen Fick (1829–1901)	Psychology	Würzburg	
1892		Gustav Retzius (1842–1919)	Anatomy	Stockholm	
1891		Melchior Treub (1851–1910)	Botany	Buitenzorg	
1890		Dionýz Štúr (1827–1893)	Geology	Vienna	
1889		Otto Wallach (1847–1931)	Chemistry	Göttingen	
1888		Julius von Hann (1839–1921)	Meteorology	Vienna	
1887		Karl Weierstrass (1815–1897)	Mathematics	Berlin	
1886		Adolf Kussmaul (1822–1902)	Internal Medicine	Strasbourg	
1885		Ludwig Lindenschmit (1809–1893)	Anthropology	Mainz	
1884		Rudolf Heidenhain (1834–1897)	PsychologyLindenschmit	Breslau	
1883		Franz Eilhard Schulze (1840–1921)	Zoology	Graz	
1882		Nathanael Pringsheim (1823–1894)	Botany	Berlin	
1881		Joachim Barrande (1799–1883)	Palaeontology	Prague	
1880		August Michaelis (1847–1916)	Chemistry	Karlsruhe	
1880		Friedrich Wöhler (1800–1882)	Chemistry	Gottigen	
1880		Heinrich Robert Göppert (1838–1882)	Botany	Breslau	
1879		Wilhelm Weber (1804–1891)	Physics	Göttingen	
1878		Hugo Gyldén (1841–1896)	Astronomy	Stockholm	
1877		Joseph Lister (1827–1912)	Surgery	Edinburgh	
1876		Alexander Ecker (1816–1887)	Anatomy	Freiburg	
1876		August Weismann (1834–1914)	Zoology	Freiburg	
1876		August Wilhelm Eichler (1839–1887)	Botany	Kiel	
1876		Carl Ludwig (1816–1895)	Psychology	Leipzig	
1876		Ferdinand Tiemann (1848–1899)	Chemistry	Berlin	
1876		Fridolin von Sandberger (1826–1898)	Palaeontology	Würzburg	
1876		Giovanni Virginio Schiaparelli (1835–1910)	Astronomy	Milan	
1876		Gustav Robert Kirchhoff (1824–1887)	Physics	Berlin	
1867		Wilhelm Haarmann (1847–1931)	Chemistry	Holzminden	
1864		Ernst Haeckel (1834–1919)	Zoology	Jena	

== See also ==
- Cothenius Medal awardees, 1792-1861
