= Cothenius Medal awardees, 1792–1861 =

Awards given by the German National Academy of Sciences Leopoldina

Leopoldina Cothenius Medal
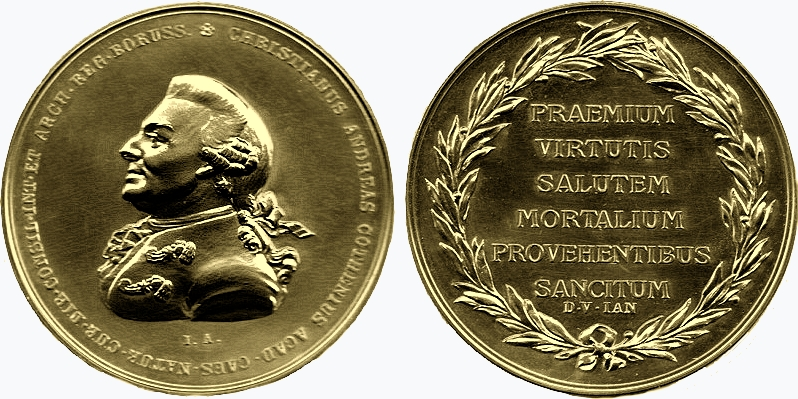
- The Cothenius medal
- Awarded for: Outstanding research in any branch of science
- Sponsored by: German National Academy of Sciences Leopoldina
- Country: Germany
- First award: 1792; 234 years ago
- Website: Cothenius Medal

This is a list of Cothenius Medal awardees for the period between 1792 and 1861.

== List of Laureates ==
Year	Image	Laureate	Discipline	City	Ref
1861		Johann Ernst Ludwig Falke (1805–1880)	Veterinarian medicine, Pathology	Moscow	
1806		Carl Christoph Friedrich von Jäger (1773–1828)	Physician	Stuttgart	
1806		August Heinrich Ferdinand Gutfeld (1777–1808)	Physician	Hamburg	
1800		Heinrich Cotta (1763 - 1844)	Silviculturist	Tharandt	
1800		Franz Justus Frenzel (1740–1823)	Botanist		
1795		Christoph Wilhelm Hufeland (1762–1836)	Physician	Berlin	
1792		Georg Christian Gottlieb Wedekind (1761–1831)	Physician		
1792		Gerhard Anton Gramberg (1744–1817)	Physician	Oldenburg	
1792		Cornelis Johannes Vos (1768–1819)	Physician	Utrecht	
