= Johannes Weigelt =

German palaeontologist and geologist

- Johannes Weigelt in 1941
- Born: 24 July 1890; Reppen
- Died: April 22, 1948 (aged 57); Klein-Gerau
- Education: Martin Luther University Halle-Wittenberg
- Known for: Research into Taphonomy, founder of Biostratinomy
- Awards: Cothenius Medal, 1932
- Scientific career
- Fields: Paleontology, Geology

Theodor Otto Gustav Johannes Weigelt (24 July 1890 in Reppen, 22 April 1948 in Klein-Gerau) was a German paleontological, geologist. After studying at the Martin Luther University Halle-Wittenberg, he habilitated in December 1918 and initially worked as a collections assistant at Halle before he began an academic career at the same university. In 1924, he was commissioned to study the geology of seismic events along the Texas Gulf Coast and discovered that salt domes were important in oil drilling. Weigelt's study of fossil specimens on the gulf coast, led him to become the first proponent of taphonomy, the study of how organisms decay and eventually become fossilised. In 1926, he became a lecturer at University of Greifswald. A year later he published "Recent Vertebrate Corpses and Their Palaeobiological Significance" that cemented his reputation as the founder of biostratinomy the process that occurs after an organism dies but before its final burial. The work led to a promotion as full professor. In 1929, he moved back to Halle to take the position of professor of geology, succeeding his former scientific mentor Johannes Walther. In Halle, he made an extensive study of vertebrate fossils in the Kupferschiefer area and collected many thousands of specimens. In 1933, he became a Nazi. In 1934, he founded the Museum for Earth Science of Central Germany at Martin Luther University Halle-Wittenberg. After the war, he was denazified, fined and was no longer allowed to work.

== Life ==
After finishing high school, which he spent in Halle and Blankenburg in 1909, Weigelt studied natural sciences and prehistory at the Martin Luther University Halle-Wittenberg. Due to the death of his father and his mother's illness, Weigelt was forced to become financially independent. His first job between 1911 and 1912, was to assist Otto Schlüter at the geographical department at the university, working at the same time as his study. In 1913, he was an assistant to Johannes Walther at the Institute of Geography. Just one year later, in 1914, he wrote a geological-archaeological thesis on the stratigraphic work on the Upper Harz Kulm, but was only awarded his doctorate in December 1917 due to the outbreak of the World War I and his voluntary participation in it. In the thesis, Weigelt examined the variability of bivalve species Posidonomya becheri, in the process finding many special cases of the species, in the fossil sedimentation that resulted in insights into sediment petrography. Through the research, he was able to identify an iron ore deposit in Salzgitter. He had through understanding of the structure of the deposit, that was confirmed by drilling.

In 1915, Weigelt was severely wounded in the war by shrapnel in and spent the next two and half years in hospital. Just one year after his doctorate, Weigelt habilitated in December 1918, with a geological-palaeontological thesis. In December 1918. he found work as collection assistant at the Geological Institute of the University of Halle.

== Career ==
In 1924, he was promoted to associate professor. During the year, he received a commission to monitor seismic events on the Texas Gulf Coast. An examination of subsoil bulges led to the discovery of salt domes that was confirmed by drilling and led to investigations into salt tectonics and their importance to oil drilling. Through research in Texas, he was able to describe the importance of salt domes to the Northern Germany oil deposits.

In 1926, Weigelt received a lectureship at the University of Greifswald. In 1927, he formalised his research taken during his time in Texas to publish "Recent Vertebrate Corpses and Their Palaeobiological Significance" that cemented his reputation as the founder of Biostratinomy. The book examines the causes of mass extinctions, the way animals die and how it effects fossilisation with a particular examination of the fossil record at Smithers Lake. In 1927, in the Gulf coastal plains, he was able to excavate and examine a large number of fossils which he collected. In 1928, Weigelt completed his commission in Texas he returned to Germany and was promoted to full professor of geology and palaeontology, succeeding Otto Jaekel. A year later in 1929, Weigelt became full professor of geology and palaeontology at the University of Halle, succeeding his former scientific mentor Johannes Walther. Over many years, he conducted research into the tectonic and stratigraphic diversity of the mountain areas around Halle and in particular the Kupferschiefer, i.e. copper slate deposits that are common in Halle, of which many samples were sent to the collection at the Museum of Central German Earth History. In 1930, he examined the fossil of a reptile, Weigeltisaurus, whose original scientificic name was Palaeochamaeleo jaekeli but later renamed to Weigeltisaurus jaekeli. The reptile had originally been found by a fossil hunter and purchased by Otto Jaekel and it led Weigelt to conduct an osteological study of the specimen. However, his main interest was a biostratonomic study in the context of the location and preservation of ganoid fish fossils. Weigelt also studied plant fossils in the Kupferschiefer area, that lead to a large paleobiological study of many species of plants. His most important study that period was the discovery and excavation of fossil vertebrates in the lignite coal deposits of the Kupferschiefer. The existence of vertebrate fossils in the area had been known about since 1908 and had been first excavated by Walther in 1926. Weigelt understood from the first that these excavations would become his life's work. During this period, he was fundamentally interested in biostratonomic problems.

== Geiseltal Museum ==
Throughout this period Weigelt collected a huge number of plant, animal and other types of paleobiological specimens. These were initially stored in an old church, then a Bishops manse. By 1934, the quality and quantity of specimens eventually became sufficient to found the geologically paleontological Geiseltalmuseum in Halle. The collection comprises around 50,000 fossils and is part of the central repository of natural science collections at Martin Luther University.

== Nazism ==
In 1933, he joined the Nazis (membership number 2,255,659), became a member of the Sturmabteilung and also became a member of the National Socialist Teachers League in 1934. He became vice president of the Leopoldina in 1932 and was regarded as the Nazi party's supervisor.

From November 1936 to January 1945, he was rector of the University of Halle and promoted its reorganization in line with armaments policy and Nazi ideology. He also worked as an advisor to the four-year plan authority and developed ore deposits for the industrial conglomerate Reichswerke Hermann Göring in Salzgitter. From 1939, he was also one of the editors of the journal "Der Biologe" (The Biologist), which had been taken over by the SS Ahnenerbe.

At the end of the World War II, he was denazified in Hesse with a fine, but was no longer employed.

== Societies ==
In 1936, Weigelt became a corresponding member of the Saxon Academy of Sciences in Leipzig. This was followed by corresponding membership of the Prussian Academy of Sciences in Berlin in 1941.

He was also a member and chairman of the Natural Science Association for Saxony and Thuringia in Halle and became honorary member in 1936. He was president of the German Paleontological Society from 1936 to 1938, honorary president of the German National Academy of Sciences Leopoldina in 1938 and chairman of the Thuringian Geological Association in 1941 where he succeeded German mineralogist Gottlob Linck.

== Awards and honours ==
In 1932, Weigelt was appointed to the position of Vice President of the German National Academy of Sciences Leopoldina, a position he held until 1942. In 1934, the Leopoldina honoured him with the Cothenius Medal for particularly important scientific work in relation to his work in the Geisel Valley. Weigelt was awarded several high medals of the National Socialist regime and was appointed Gaudozentenführer (local leader of a faculty) in 1945.

== Works ==
- Weigelt, Johannes; Schaefer, Judith (2009) [1927]. Recent Vertebrate Carcasses and Their Paleobiological Implications. Chicago: University of Chicago Press. ISBN 9780226881683.
