= Day labor =

Work done where the worker is hired and paid one day at a time

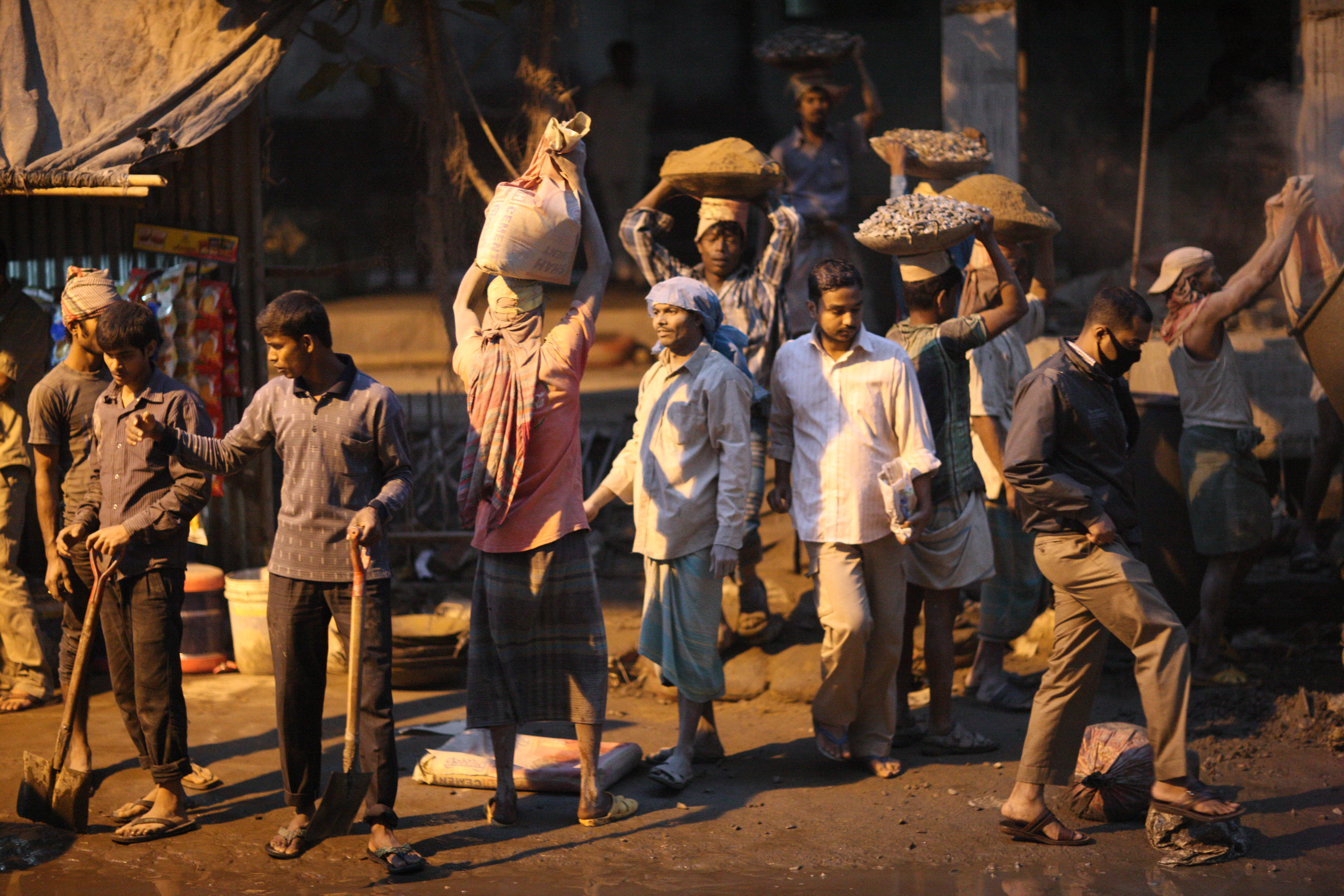
Construction laborers in Chittagong, Bangladesh.

Day labor (or day labour in Commonwealth spelling) is work done where the worker is hired and paid one day at a time, with no promise that more work will be available in the future, and outside the protection of labor and civil rights laws. It is a form of contingent work.

== Types ==
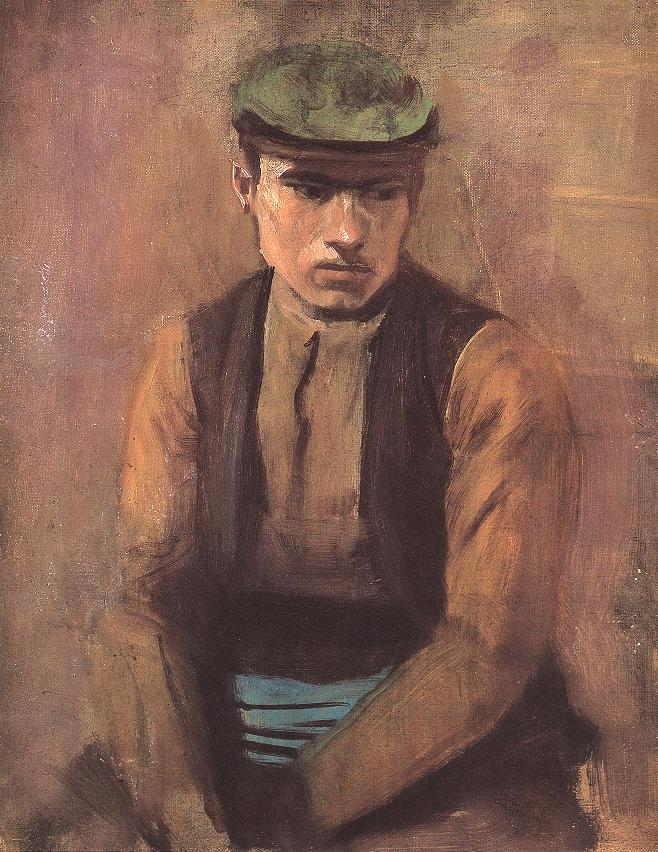
Day Labourer (painting by László Mednyánszky)

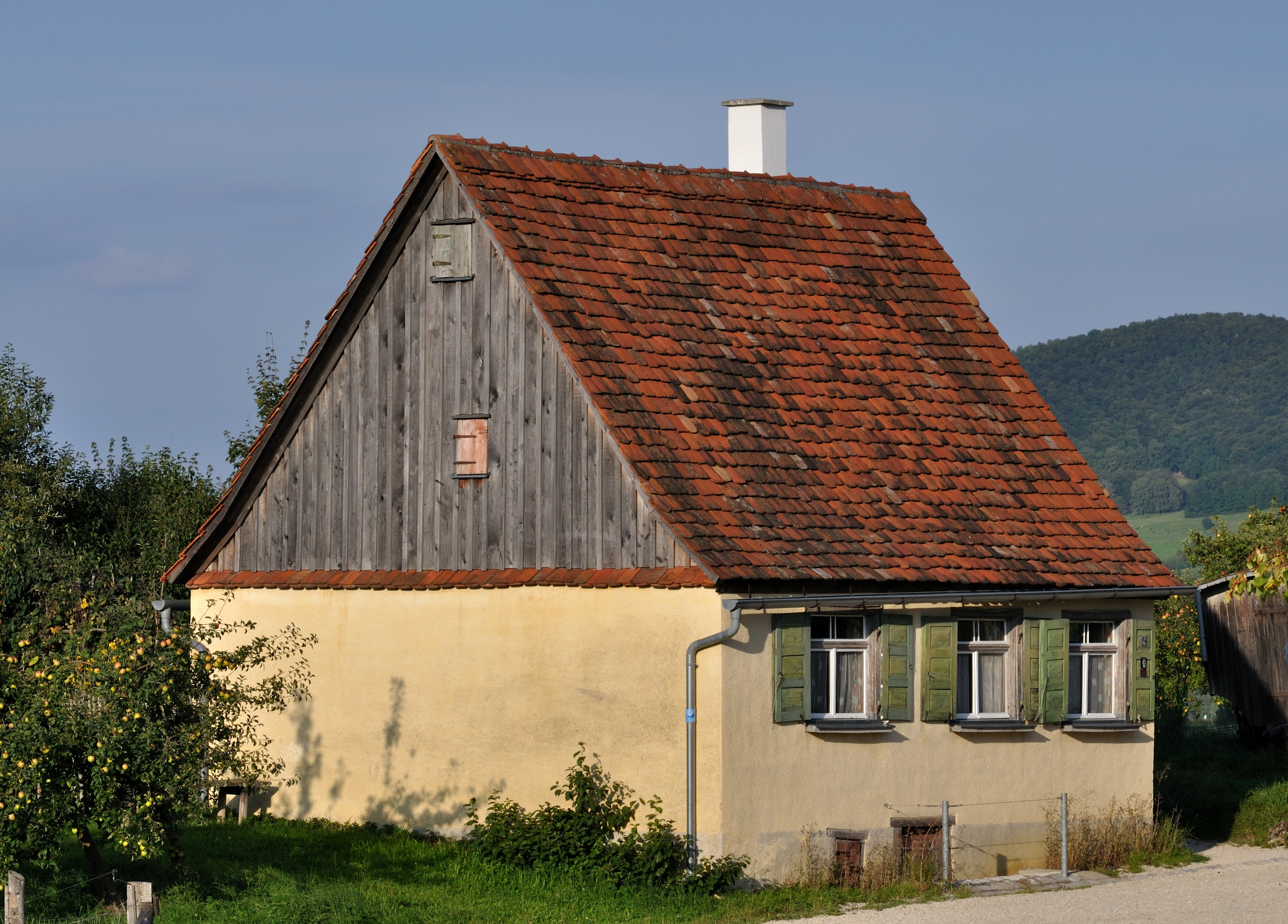
House of a day labourer in the Open-air museum Beuren, Germany

Day laborers (also known archaically as daysmen) find work through several common routes.

Some employment agencies specialize in very short-term contracts for manual labor, primarily in construction, factories, offices, and manufacturing. These companies usually have offices where workers can arrive and be immediately assigned to a job.

Unions are a second route through which workers find employment. In situations such as an unexpected change in construction plans, an employer may require additional appropriately skilled labor. By contacting a workers' union, the manager can find laborers with appropriate skills. In turn, the union workers have a higher chance of being employed since the manager is able to find workers to employ. Thus, the benefit of union representation applies to both the worker and the employer. Through the union, workers are given a source of recourse to achieve a safe work environment free of favoritism and arbitrary work assignments. Employers benefit from organized labor training programs, benefit plans, dispute resolution and a labor supply meeting labor demand at many times or places. A labor supply arriving at a specified time and location with less than a day's notice results in reduced overhead resources, which benefits the employer.

Less formally, workers offer their work to potential employers such as building contractors, landscapers, home owners, and small business owners. Workers assemble at well-known locations, such as street corners or commercial parking lots, in the hope of finding such work.

== By country ==
=== United States ===
Informal day labor is not new to the United States, and day laborers are not always migrant workers in many cases. In his study of day laborers in Atlanta, Terry Easton interviews white, black, and Hispanic workers. Many other metropolitan areas still have non-immigrant day laborers, and many other large and small cities have immigrant day laborers from a variety of countries, including Mongolia, Poland, Russia, Brazil, Central and South America, and countries in Africa. Non-immigrant informal day labor, present in many cities, does not generate the controversy or calls to police and local government seen when immigrant day laborers gather to wait for work.

The day labor workforce in the United States is overwhelmingly male (98%) and predominantly Latino. According to survey data by UCLA, 59% of day laborers were born in Mexico, 14% in Guatemala, and 8% in Honduras. Approximately 75% of these workers are undocumented, though 11% have pending legal status claims.

Nonetheless, immigrants are a large source of day labor in the United States. Often, day labor work is in small residential construction or landscaping. These workers earn, on average, $8–$10 an hour. The media and a 2005 study by UCLA portrays day laborers as mostly being illegal immigrants from Mexico and Central America, who would otherwise be unable to work due to employment regulations. Other research has found that day laborers are not typically illegal immigrants. Many are citizens of the US, and day labor is often a transition to full-time work.

Unorganized day labor creates problems for day laborers: 1 in 3 corner day laborers have experienced theft of wages in the past two months and 1 in 5 experienced a serious worksite injury in the past year. Low wages and poor working conditions, employer abuse, and lack of insurance for work related accidents is common.

In addition to wage theft, day laborers frequently report encountering unsafe working conditions without training, protective gear or access to medical care. A study by the National Lawyers Guild's Labor and Employment committee found that many workers fear retaliation or immigration consequences if they report injuries or unsafe conditions.

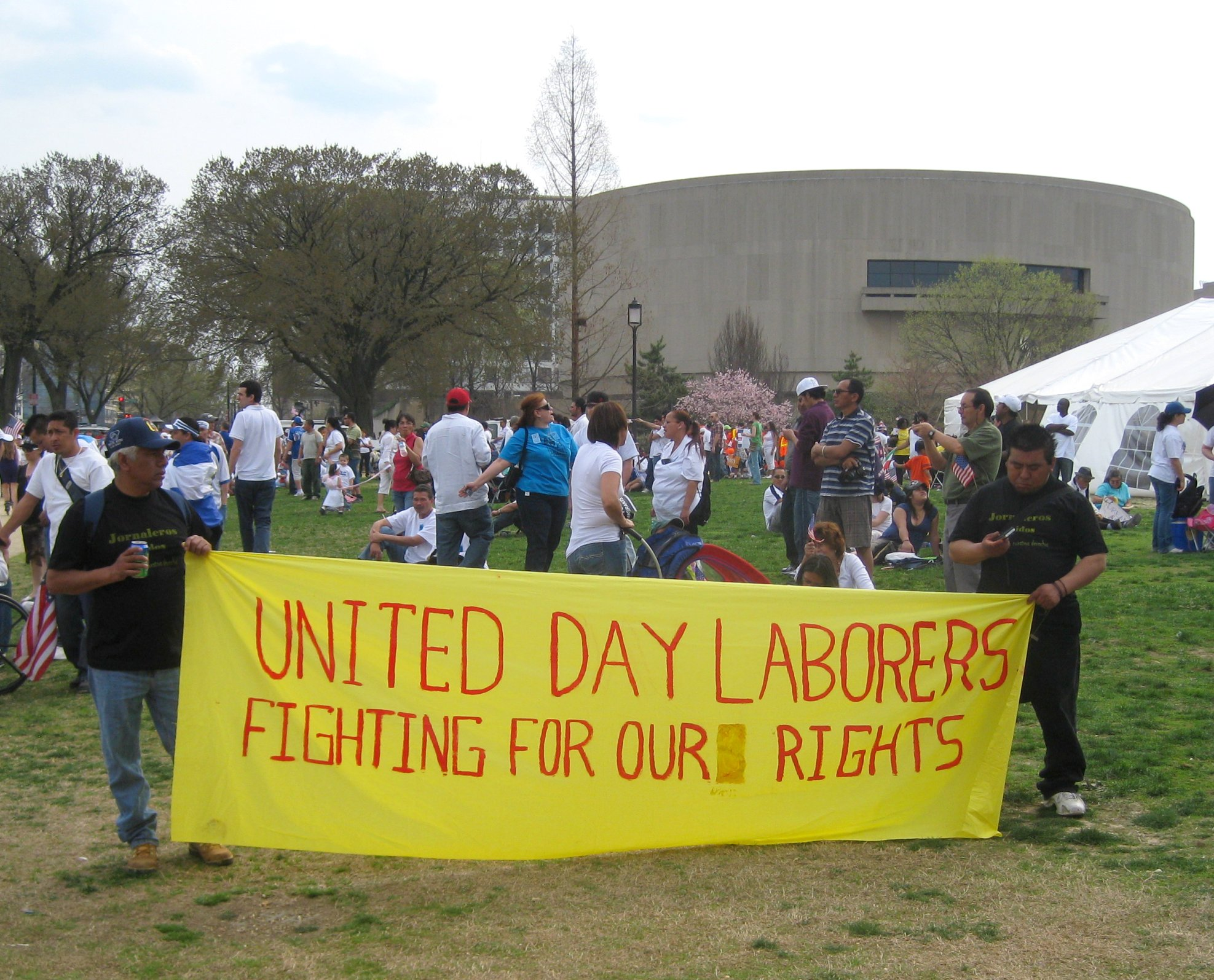
Organizing around day labor has been an driving force in political and policy making in the United States

Some municipalities and communities have supported workers' efforts to organize themselves into democratically run workers' centers, designated areas, and organizations to defend workers' rights in general. Workers' Centers of this kind date back at least 18 years to Los Angeles. Other municipalities have targeted day labor sites for aggressive enforcement of immigration laws.

Though united in their commitment to the rights of immigrant workers, NDLON and the Day Labor Research Institute represent different models of day labor center. NDLON represents the "social service agency model" and the Institute the "day laborer designed model." These different models of day labor centers may yield markedly different results that reflect the different goals of each model.

Problems when workers' centers are established can involve day laborers continuing to congregate in large numbers on the streets surrounding the day labor centers, refusing to leave the street to use the center, and large numbers of day laborers drawn from other areas to the streets surrounding the centers. Low levels of work at the centers, low wages, and problems with the job distribution system are also common.

Day laborers in the United States have also played a critical role in disaster responses and recovery work, assisting with debris removal, rebuilding homes, and cleaning up hazardous waste after events like wildfires and hurricanes. During the height of the COVID-19 pandemic, most day laborers continued working frontlines without access to protective gear, paid leave, or healthcare, highlighting their vulnerability.

Immigration policies in the US significantly impact day laborers in the US, many of whom are undocumented and vulnerable to exploitation. Fear of deportation can deter workers from reporting wage theft or unsafe working conditions. Additionally, immigration enforcement actions near hiring sites have been known to disrupt workers' ability to find employment and contribute to fear and instability within the work force.

=== Switzerland ===
During the Middle Ages and early modern period, day laborers occupied an inferior social position as dependent workers without formal training, living in sublet housing and generally lacking citizenship rights. In cities with corporatist regimes, some day laborers in transport and agriculture were admitted to guilds such as "servant guilds" (Knechtezünfte), allowing limited political participation. Life for day laborers was characterized by irregular employment with changing employers, seasonal work, high geographical mobility, and low wages often paid partly in food and lodging.

In the 19th and 20th centuries, day labor became predominantly agricultural. Swiss censuses reported 45,000 agricultural day laborers (including one-fifth women) in 1888 and 1900, about half as numerous as domestic servants on family farms. Their numbers declined rapidly through the 20th century due to mechanization and rural exodus to industrial employment: from nearly 15,000 in 1930 to fewer than 1,000 by 1970. Official figures understated the practice, as they excluded artisans and small farmers who worked seasonally for larger operations, mountain farmers who descended to the plains as itinerant workers, and others for whom day labor was not a primary occupation. In modern Swiss agriculture, day labor persists mainly for partially mechanized tasks and fruit harvesting.

== See also ==
- Peon
- Precariat
- Substitute teacher
- Temporary work
