= Tschermakite =

Amphibole, double chain inosilicate mineral

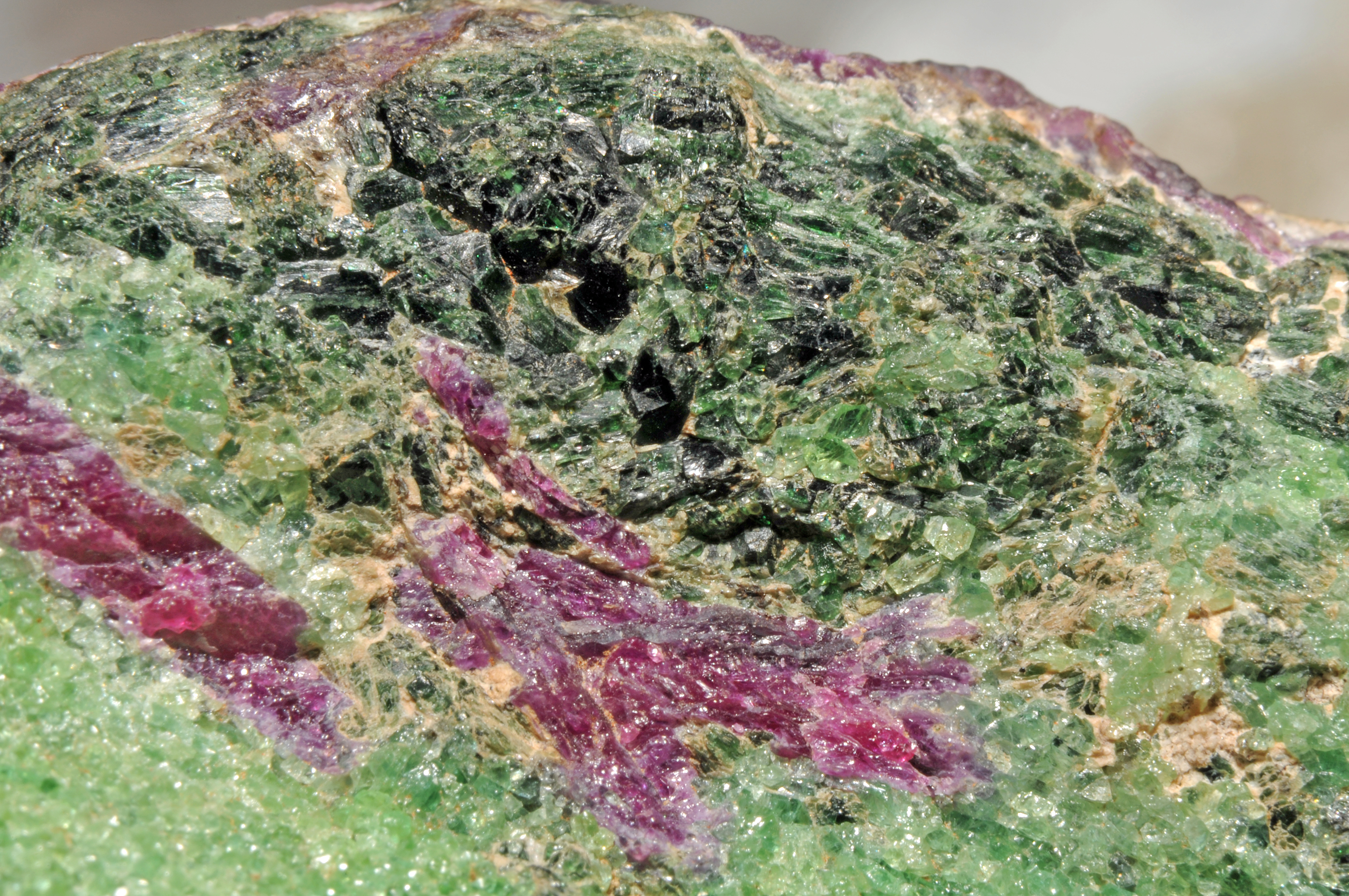
- Anyolite, a metamorphic rock: chrome-zoisite (bright green), tschermakite (black), ruby (red)

General
- Category: Silicate mineral (amphibole)
- Formula: Ca_{2}(Mg_{3}Al_{2})(Si_{6}Al_{2})O_{22}(OH)_{2}
- IMA symbol: Tsr
- Strunz classification: 9.DE.10
- Crystal system: Monoclinic
- Crystal class: Prismatic (2/m) (same H-M symbol)
- Space group: C2/m
- Unit cell: a = 9.762(6) Å b = 17.994(12) Å c = 5.325(6) Å; β = 105.10(8)°; Z = 2

Identification
- Color: Medium to dark green to green-black to black, brown (rare)
- Crystal habit: As prismatic crystals or as reaction rims on other minerals
- Twinning: Simple or multiple twinning parallel to {100}
- Cleavage: Perfect on {110} Parting on {100}{001}
- Fracture: Conchoidal
- Tenacity: Brittle
- Mohs scale hardness: 5–6
- Luster: Vitreous
- Streak: Pale grey-green
- Diaphaneity: Transparent
- Specific gravity: 3.15
- Optical properties: Biaxial (−)
- Refractive index: n_{α} = 1.623–1.660 n_{β} = 1.630–1.680 n_{γ} = 1.638–1.688
- Birefringence: δ = 0.015–0.028
- Pleochroism: Visible in browns and greens
- 2V angle: Measured: 60° to 90°

The endmember hornblende tschermakite (Ca_{2}(Mg_{3}Al_{2})(Si_{6}Al_{2})O_{22}(OH)_{2}) is a calcium-rich monoclinic amphibole mineral. It is frequently synthesized along with its ternary solid solution series members tremolite and cummingtonite so that the thermodynamic properties of its assemblage can be applied to solving other solid solution series from a variety of amphibole minerals.

== Mineral composition ==
Tschermakite is an end-member of the hornblende subgroup in the calcic-amphibole group. Calcium-rich amphiboles have the general formula X_{2–3}Y_{5}Z_{8}O_{22}(OH)_{2}, where X=Ca, Na, K, Mn; Y=Mg, Fe^{+2}, Fe^{+3}, Al, Ti, Mn, Cr, Li, Zn; Z=Si, Al (Deer et al., 1963). The structure of tremolite (Ca_{2}Mg_{5}(Si_{8}O_{22})(OH,F)_{2}), another calcic amphibole, is commonly used as the standard for calcic amphiboles from which the formulae for their substitutions are derived. The wide range in variety of minerals classified in the amphibole group is due to its great ability for ionic replacement resulting in a widely varying chemical composition. Amphiboles can be classified on the basis of the substitution of ions on the X site as well as the substitution of AlAl for Si(Mg,Fe^{2+}). In the calcium, amphiboles like tschermakite Ca_{2}(Mg, Fe^{2+})_{3}Al_{2} (Si_{6} Al_{2}) O_{22}(OH)_{2}, the predominant ion in the X position is occupied by Ca as in tremolite, while the substitution MgSi↔AlAl occurs on the Y and the tetrahedral Z site.

== Geologic occurrence ==
Hornblendes are the most common of the amphiboles and are formed in a wide range of Pressure-Temperature environments. Tschermakite is found in eclogites and ultramafic igneous rocks as well as in medium to high-grade metamorphic rocks. The mineral is widespread throughout the world but has most notably been studied in Greenland, Scotland, Finland, France, and Ukraine (Anthony, 1995). Because amphibole minerals like Tschermakite are hydrous (contain an OH group), they can break down to denser anhydrous minerals like pyroxene or garnet at high temperatures. Conversely, amphiboles can be recomposed from pyroxenes as a result of crystallizing igneous rocks as well as during metamorphism (Léger and Ferry, 1991). Because of this important quality, P-T conditions have repeatedly been calculated for the crystallization of hornblendes in calc-alkaline magmas (Féménias et al., 2006). In addition to studying tschermakitic content in its natural occurrences, geologists have frequently synthesized this mineral in order to further calculate its place as an endmember hornblende.

== Namesake biography ==
Gustav Tschermak von Seysenegg (1836–1927) Austrian mineralogist.

Tschermakite received its name in honor of the Austrian mineralogist Professor Gustav Tschermak von Seysenegg (1836–1927), whose mineral textbook Lehrbuch der Mineralogie (orig. pub. 1883) was described as the German-language equivalent to the works of Edward Salisbury Dana (Mineralogy, 1885).

In 1872 Professor Tschermak founded one of Europe's oldest geoscience journals, Mineralogische Mitteilungen (English: Mineralogical Disclosures, now titled Mineralogy and Petrology). In the first volume of Min. Mitt., Tschermak established some of the early classifications of the amphibole group in relation to the pyroxene group of minerals (Tschermak 1871), which no doubt led to the formula Ca_{2}Mg_{3}Al_{4}Si_{6}O_{22}(OH)_{2} being known as the Tschermak molecule; this mineral formula was later assigned the name tschermakite as first proposed by Winchell (1945). Professor Tschermak spent many years working as curator for the Imperial Mineralogical Cabinet. The Mineralogical Department of the Imperial Natural History Museum in Vienna – an impressive mineral, meteorite, and fossil collection – has Professor Tschermak to thank for his detailed inventory system that has helped preserve it to this day as well as the expansion of their meteorite collection. He was a full professor of mineralogy and petrography at the University of Vienna as well as a full member of the Imperial Academy of Sciences in Vienna. He was also the first president of the Viennese (now Austrian) Mineralogical Society, founded in 1901. An obituary for "Hofrat Professor Dr. Gustav Tschermak" written by Edward S. Dana (1927) can be found in the 12th volume of American Mineralogist, where Dana recalls the two young scientists earlier work together in the Vienna Mineral Cabinet and remarks on Professor Tschermak's vigor and clarity of mind maintained up to his final days. Gustav Tschermak's third child, Erich von Tschermak-Seysenegg (1871–1962), was a renowned botanist who is credited for independently rediscovering Gregor Mendel's genetic laws of inheritance by working with similar plant-breeding experiments.

== Mineral structure ==
The amphibole group consists of an orthorhombic and monoclinic series – hornblendes and tschermakite both belong to the latter crystal structure. The crystal group of tschermakite is 2/m.

Tschermakite and all the hornblende varieties are inosilicates, and like the other rock-forming amphiboles are double-chain silicates (Klein and Hurlbut, 1985). The amphibole structure is characterized by its two double chains of SiO_{4} tetrahedra (T1 and T2) sandwiching in a strip of cations (M1, M2, and M3 octahedra). Much of the discussions and studies of both tschermakite and tremolite have been to resolve the varying cation placements and Al substitutions that seem to occur on all T and M sites (Najorka and Gottschalk, 2003).

== Physical properties ==
A hand specimen of tschermakite is green-to-black in color; its streak will be greenish white. It can be transparent to translucent and has a vitreous luster. Tschermakite shows the characteristic amphibole perfect cleavage on [110]. Its average density is 3.24, with a hardness of 5–6; its fracture will be brittle to conchoidal. In thin section its optic sign and 2V angle cover a wide range and are not very useful for identification. It shows a distinct pleochroism in browns and greens.

== Special characteristics ==
Much discussion and experimentation on tschermakite has been in relation to it being synthesized along with other calcic-amphiboles to determine the stoichiometric and barometric constraints of the various amphibole solid solution series. Because of the (Mg, Fe, Ca), Si↔Al, Al tschermak cation exchange that is fundamental to not only the amphibole group but also the pyroxenes, micas, and chlorites (Najorka and Gottschalk, 2003; Ishida and Hawthorne, 2006). Tschermakite has been synthesized in numerous experiments along with its ternary solid solution endmembers tremolite and cummingtonite in order to relate its varying compositions to a specific P and T. The thermodynamic data that results from these tests helps to calculate further geothermobarometric equations in both synthesized and natural forms of a variety of minerals.
