= Gustav Tschermak von Seysenegg =

Austrian mineralogist

Gustav Tschermak
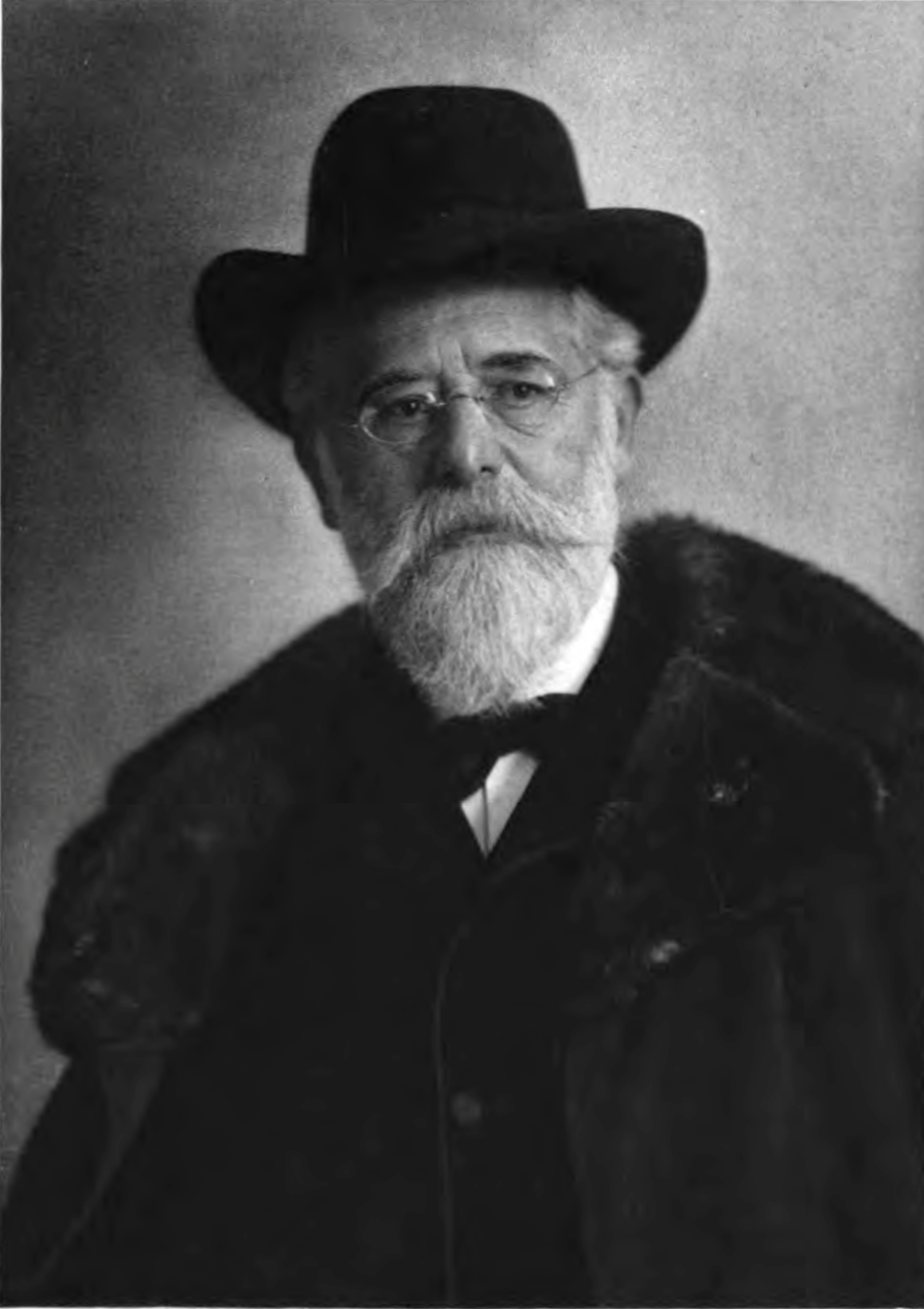
- Born: 19 April 1836; Litovel, Moravia
- Died: 4 May 1927 (aged 91); Vienna, Austria
- Known for: Meteorite classification
- Scientific career
- Fields: Mineralogy

Gustav Tschermak von Seysenegg (19 April 1836 – 24 May 1927) was an Austrian mineralogist.

== Biography ==
He was born in Litovel, Moravia, and studied at the University of Vienna, where he obtained a teaching degree. He studied mineralogy at Heidelberg and Tübingen and obtained a PhD. He returned to Vienna as a lecturer in mineralogy and chemistry and, in 1862 was appointed second vice curator of the Imperial Mineralogical Cabinet, becoming director in 1868. He resigned as director in 1877. He was also professor of petrography at the University of Vienna. He was appointed professor in 1873 and a member of the Imperial Academy of Sciences, a member of the American Philosophical Society in 1882, and a member of the Royal Swedish Academy of Sciences in 1905. He died in 1927, aged 91.

== Work ==
He did useful work on many minerals and on meteorites. The mineral tschermakite is named in his honour. In 1871 he established the Mineralogische Mitteilungen (Mineralogical Reports), published after 1878 as the Mineralogische und petrographische Mitteilungen (Mineralogical and Petrographical Reports). His publications include:

- Die Porphyrgesteine Oesterreichs (1869)
- Die mikroskopische Beschaffenheit der Meteoriten (1883)
- Lehrbuch der Mineralogie (1884; 5th ed. 1897) Digital 5th edition by the University and State Library Düsseldorf

== Family ==
He had two sons, Armin von Tschermak-Seysenegg, professor of physiology, and Erich von Tschermak-Seysenegg, a botanist, who were one of the re-discoverers of Mendel's laws of genetics.

== See also ==
- Glossary of meteoritics
