= Night Travellers at a Cross =

Painting by Ladislav Mednyánszky

- Noční pútnici pri kríži (Slovak)
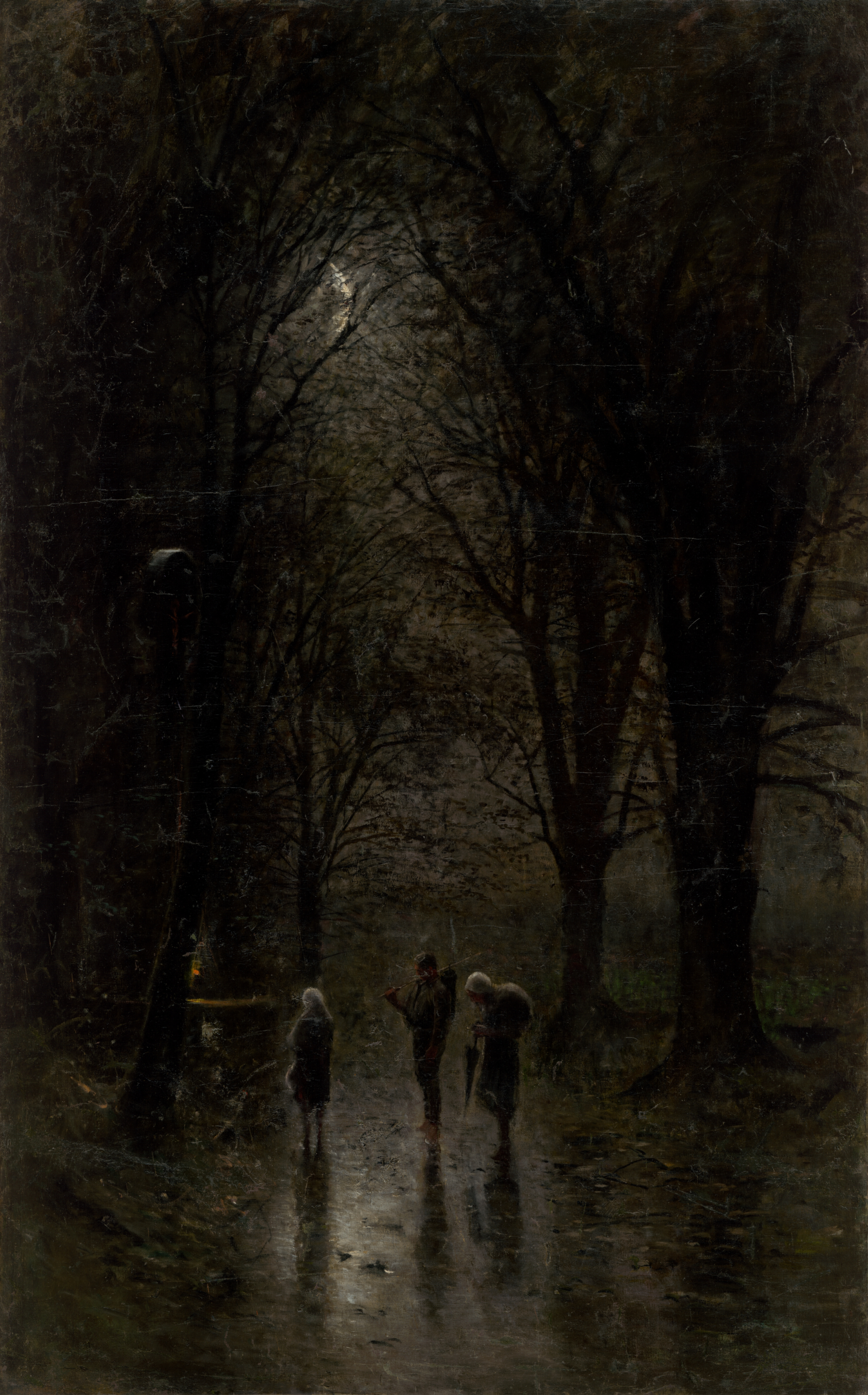
- Artist: László Mednyánszky
- Year: 1880
- Medium: tempera on panel
- Dimensions: 244 cm × 94.5 cm (96 in × 37.2 in)
- Location: Slovak National Gallery, Bratislava

Night Travellers at a Cross (Slovak: Noční pútnici pri kríži) is a painting by Hungarian artist László Mednyánszky from 1880.

== Description ==
The picture was created in the first half of 1880. It has the dimensions 244 x 149 centimeters. It is in the collection of the Slovak National Gallery.

== Analysis ==
The picture shows three people with bowed heads who pray at the cross in a dark forest at night. The composition's monumental scale is emphasized by the size of the travellers, as well as by the moonlight.

The theme of a cross in a forest - which has symbolized death - is seen regularly in Mednyánszky's works.
