= Dionýz Štúr =

Slovak geologist and paleontologist (1827–1893)

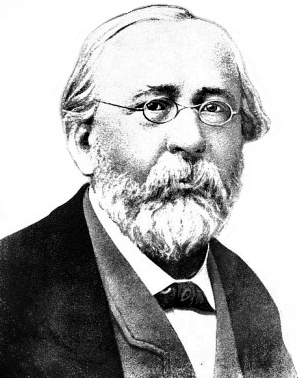
- Dionýz Štúr
- Born: 2 April 1827; Beckov
- Died: 26 April 1893 (aged 65); Vienna
- Resting place: Matzleinsdorf Protestant Cemetery
- Education: Vienna Polytechnic
- Parents: Jozef Štúr (father); Jana Riznerová (mother)
- Relatives: Ľudovít Štúr
- Awards: Cothenius Medal in 1890, Albert Order (Knight's Cross 1st Class), Order of Leopold II (Knight's Cross, 1892)
- Scientific career
- Fields: Geology, Paleontology and Botany

Dionysus Rudolphus Josephus (Dionýz Štúr) (2 April 1827 – 9 October 1893) was a Slovak geologist and paleontologist who worked as the director of the Reich Geological Institute in Vienna. He dealt with geological mapping and phytopaleontology (Note: The study of ancient plants and plant fossils. Later renamed as Paleobotany.) of Austria, Bohemia, Moravia and Slovakia. Štúr's research played a decisive role in the fundamental systematic geological exploration of the Alps, especially the Tauern.

== Life ==
Štúr was born on 2 April 1827 in Beckov into a family of teachers. His father was Jozef Štúr, who initially home schooled him and his mother was Jana (Johanka) née Riznerová. His remote family included the politician and revolutionary Ľudovít Štúr, who was his second cousin. Štúr had three older siblings. Two older brothers died in infancy, Karol Štúr and Ľudovít Jozef Štúr. The third sibling was Karolína Štúrová.

In 1855, Štúr married the Austrian German Cecilia Artlová, with whom he had no children.

== Education ==
Štúr undertook his secondary education at a grammar school in Modra, when his family moved there when he was 12. He then attended the Protestant Lyceum in Pressburg (Bratislava), where he studied philosophy, for a period. In 1844, he matriculated at the Vienna Polytechnic where he studied mathematics and natural sciences. He was particularly influenced by the work of the Austrian geologists Wilhelm von Haidinger and Franz Ritter von Hauer. In 1846 be began studying geology, mineralogy and geognosy (Note: A term in use at the time that was coined by Abraham Gottlob Werner that meant "knowledge of the Earth". It defined a science based on the recognition of the order, position, and relation of the layers forming the Earth before the theory of Continental drift became accepted.) at the mineral collection of the court chamber of the coin and mining industry in Vienna (Kaiserlich-Königlichen Hofkammer im Münz- und Bergwesen). The experience led him to receive a scholarship from the Imperial and Royal Court in 1847 to study at the Mining Academy in Schemnitz. In the same year, he published his first paper at age 20, "Geognostische Untersuchungen in der Gegend von Pressburg und Modern" (Geognostic investigations in the area of Bratislava and Modra)

== Career ==
In 1849, the Reich Geological Institute in Vienna was established with von Haidinger leading it. In 1850, Štúr was unable to continue his studies at the mining academy due to the Hungarian Revolution of 1848, as his family were loyal to the emperor. It resulted in him becoming an assistant geologist to von Haidinger with a remit to begin field work on a geological survey of Austria. He worked on the survey for a period of 22 years, initially with the Czech geologist Johann Baptist Čžjžek and the Slovenian geologist Marko Vincenc Lipold, before working on his own all over Austria. Štúrs high-quality research led to an increasingly senior appointments within his field. In 1867, Štúr was appointed to an Imperial and Royal Mining Councillor. This was followed by a further promotion to Chief Geologist in 1873 and then in 1877 to Vice Director of the Imperial and Royal Geological Institute. In 1885, he was promoted to director of the institute, a position he held until 1892.

== Death ==
In later life Štúr suffered from heart disease and died on 9 October 1893. He bequeathed his written estate to the National Museum in Martin, Slovakia.

== Publications ==
The following is Štúr's most important papers:

- Štúr, Dionýz (1860). "Bericht über die geologische Übersichtsaufnahme des Wassergebietes der Waag und Neutra" [Report on general geological mapping in Váh and Nitra catchment area.]. Jahrbuch der Geologischen Reichsanstalt (in German). 9: 17–151.
- Štúr, Dionýz (1867). "Beiträge zur Kenntniss der Flora der Süsswasserquarze der Congerien- und Cerithien-Schichten im Wiener und Ungarischen Becken" [Contributions to the knowledge of the flora of freshwater quartz of the Congerian and Cerithian layers in the Vienna and Hungarian Basins]. Jahrbuch der Kaiserlich Königlichen Geologischen Reichsanstalt (in German). 17 (1): 77–188.
- Štúr, Dionýz (1860). "Bericht über die geologische Aufnahme im oberen Waag- und Gran-Thale" [Report on the geological survey in the upper Váh and Hron valleys] (PDF). Jahrbuch der Kaiserlich Königlichen Geologischen Reichsanstalt (in German). 18: 337–425.
- Štúr, Dionýz (1869). "Bericht über die geologische Aufnahme der Umgebung von. Schmöllnitz und Göllnitz" [Report on the geological survey of the surroundings of Smolník and Gelnica.] (PDF). Jahrbuch der Kaiserlich-Königlichen Geologischen Reichsanstalt (in German). 14. Vienna: 15.

== Awards and honors ==
=== Medals ===
- Cothenius Medal in 1890
- Knight's Cross 1st Class of the Royal Saxon Albert Order
- Knight's Cross of the Order of Leopold II in 1892

=== Commemoration ===
The Slovak State Geological Institute bears his name (Štátny geologický ústav Dionýza Štúra, ŠGÚDŠ). The fossil plant genera Sturia Nemejc and Sturiella C.E.Weiss ex Potonié are named after Štúr.

== Academic societies ==
Štúr was either a member or associated member of the following academic societies:

- Imperial Academy of Sciences in Vienna in 1880. Imperial member.
- South Slav Academy of Sciences and Arts
- Senckenberg Nature Research Society in 1892. member.
- Physics & Medical Society at the University of Würzburg
- Geological Society of London
- Natural Sciences Association for Styria in Graz
- Moscow Society of Naturalists member.
- Royal Academy of Science, Letters and Fine Arts of Belgium in December 1883. Associated member
- Hungarian Geologic Society Honorary member
