= Beckov =

- Municipality
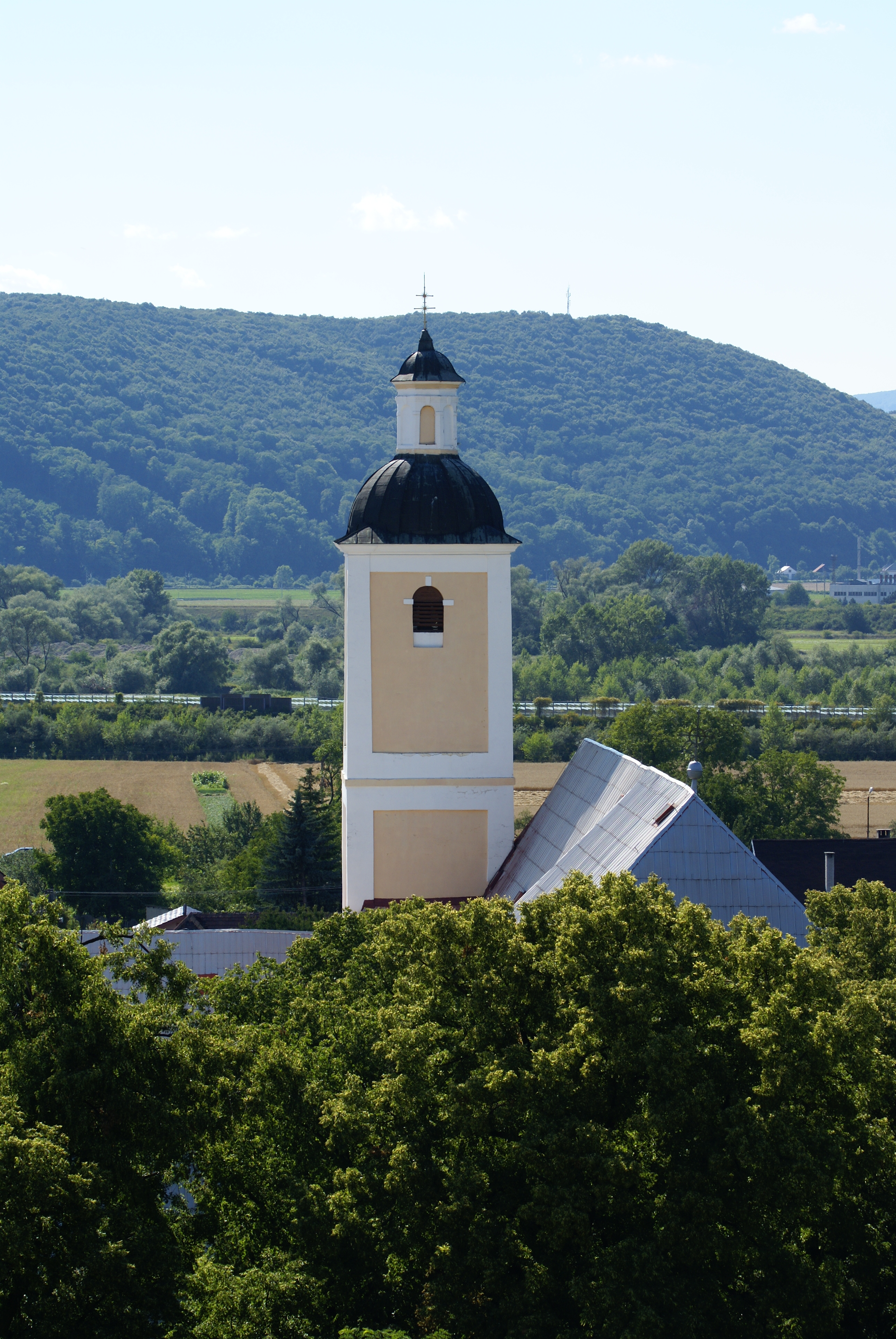

- Flag Coat of arms

- Location of Beckov in the Trenčín Region Location of Beckov in Slovakia
- Coordinates: 48.78°N 17.90°E
- Country: Slovakia
- Region: Trenčín Region
- District: Nové Mesto nad Váhom District
- First mentioned: 1208

Area
  - Total: 28.62 km^{2} (11.05 sq mi)
- Elevation: 190 m (620 ft)

Population (2025)
  - Total: 1,475
- Time zone: UTC+1 (CET)
  - Summer (DST): UTC+2 (CEST)
- Postal code: 916 38
- Area code: +421 32
- Vehicle registration plate (until 2022): NM
- Website: www.obec-beckov.sk

Beckov (Hungarian: Beckó, German: Beckow) is a village and municipality in the Nové Mesto nad Váhom District in the Trenčín Region of western Slovakia.

== History ==
In historical records the village was first mentioned in 1208. Mihály de genere Bána, royal equerry, who was the forefather of the Cseszneky family, performed several heroic deeds against the Mongolian invaders of Hungary (during the invasion in 1241–42) and for his bravery in 1241 King Béla IV appointed him Count (comes) of Beckó. Before the establishment of independent Czechoslovakia in 1918, Beckov was part of Trencsén County within the Kingdom of Hungary. From 1939 to 1945, it was part of the Slovak Republic. On the 6th of April 1945, the Red Army dislodged the Wehrmacht from Beckov and it was once again part of Czechoslovakia.

== Geography ==
The municipality lies at an altitude of 190 metres (620 ft) and covers an area of 28.62 km^{2} (11.05 sq mi) (2025).

== Population ==
Population statistic (10 years)
Year	1995	2005	2015	2025
Count	1366	1340	1349	1475
Difference		−1.90%	+0.67%	+9.34%

Population statistic
Year	2024	2025
Count	1458	1475
Difference		+1.16%

It has a population of 1475 people (31 December 2025).

=== Ethnicity ===
Census 2021 (1+ %)
Ethnicity	Number	Fraction
Slovak	1383	96.3%
Not found out	44	3.06%
Total	1436	

In year 2021 was 1436 people by ethnicity 1383 as Slovak, 44 as Not found out, 14 as Czech, 3 as Other, 2 as Bulgarian, 1 as Jewish, 1 as Vietnamese, 1 as Romani, 1 as Russian, 1 as Austrian and 1 as Moravian.

Note on population: The difference values of population numbers in the table "Population statistic" and in the sections "Ethnicity" & "Religion" is caused by the use of various statistical methods.

=== Religion ===
Census 2021 (1+ %)
Religion	Number	Fraction
Roman Catholic Church	779	54.25%
None	321	22.35%
Evangelical Church	232	16.16%
Not found out	72	5.01%
Total	1436	

In year 2021 was 1436 people by religion 779 from Roman Catholic Church, 321 from None, 232 from Evangelical Church, 72 from Not found out, 12 from Greek Catholic Church, 7 from Ad hoc movements, 4 from Other, 3 from Other and not ascertained christian church, 2 from Paganism and natural spirituality, 2 from United Methodist Church, 1 from Jehovah's Witnesses and 1 from Buddhism.

== Sights ==
Overlooking the village is Beckov Castle, now in ruins. The village, which used to be a town, was fortified by a mighty wall, large parts of which are still preserved. Religious buildings include the gothic catholic parish church and the former baroque Franciscan monastery with a church located within the walled town and a protestant parish church found outside the walls. There are several Renaissance and Baroque manors, some of which are restored and well-kept while others are dilapidated and falling into ruins.

== People ==
- Jozef Miloslav Hurban born 1817
- Baron László Mednyánszky born 1852
- Dionýz Štúr born 1827

== Gallery ==
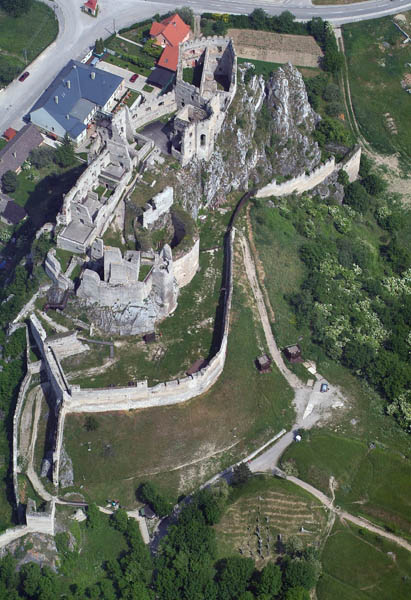

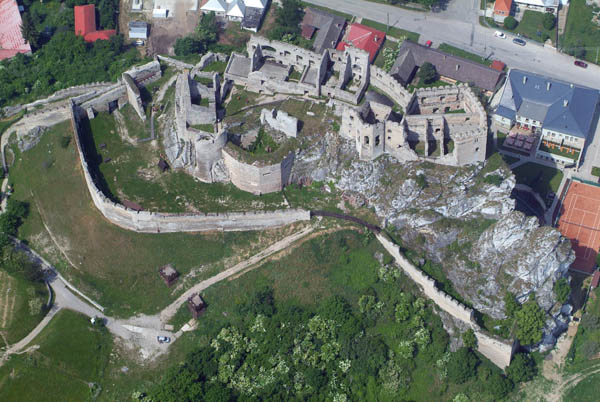

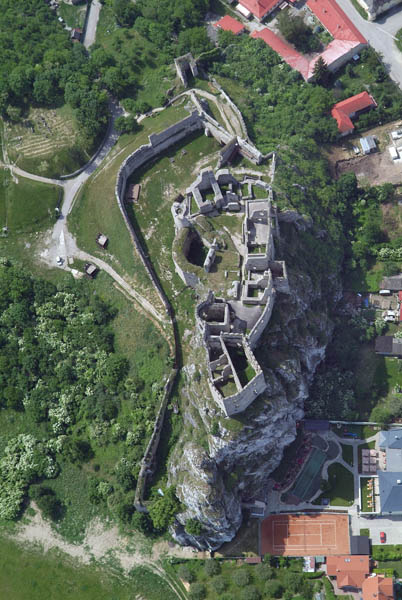

== Sources ==
- Györffy György: Az Árpád-kori Magyarország történeti földrajza

== Genealogical resources ==
The records for genealogical research are available at the state archive in Bratislava (Slovak: Štátny archív v Bratislave).

- Roman Catholic church records (births/marriages/deaths): 1676–1934 (parish A)
- Lutheran church records (births/marriages/deaths): 1792–1942 (parish A)

== See also ==
- List of municipalities and towns in Slovakia
