= Daniel Vorländer =

German chemist (1867–1941)

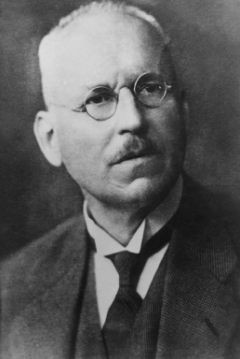
- Born: 11 June 1867; Eupen, Rhine Province
- Died: 8 June 1941 (aged 73); Halle, Province of Saxony
- Education: University of Halle-Wittenberg
- Known for: Liquid crystals
- Awards: Cothenius Medal (1908)
- Scientific career
- Fields: Chemist
- Workplaces: University of Halle-Wittenberg
- Doctoral advisor: Jacob Volhard
- Doctoral students: Hermann Staudinger

Daniel Vorländer (11 June 1867 – 8 June 1941) was a German chemist who synthesized most of the liquid crystals known until his retirement in 1935.

Vorländer was born in Eupen in Rhenish Prussia. He studied chemistry at Kiel University, the Ludwig-Maximilians-Universität München, and the Friedrich Wilhelm University of Berlin, after which he became a professor at the University of Halle-Wittenberg.

Vorländer applied his knowledge of molecular structure to select those exhibiting the crystalline liquid state. In particular a linear molecular geometry was conductive. "Over the years Vorländer and his students synthesized hundreds of liquid crystalline compounds. An interesting discovery was that amongst the slimy liquid crystals were many soap and soap-like compounds."

Vorländer served as a volunteer during World War I, during which he received the Iron Cross. He died in Halle.

== See also ==
- Chemical crystallography before X-rays

== Sources ==
- Weygand, Conrad (1943). "Daniel Vorländer. 11. 6. 1867–8. 6. 1941". Berichte der Deutschen Chemischen Gesellschaft (A and B Series). 76 (6): A41–A58. doi:10.1002/cber.19430760618.
