= Gerhard Anton Gramberg =

German physician and writer

- Born: 5 November 1744; Tettens, Lower Saxony
- Died: 10 March 1818 (aged 73); Oldenburg
- Education: University of Göttingen
- Spouse: Margaretha Sophia Janssen (1754–1829)
- Children: 10 children
- Awards: Cothenius Medal 1792
- Scientific career
- Fields: Medicine

Gerhard Anton Gramberg (born 5 November 1744 in Tettens; died 10 March 1818 in Oldenburg,Lower Saxony) was the city and district physician in Oldenburg, Germany during the late enlightenment. Gramberg was highly educated and part of the bourgeois class and considered an enlightenment thinker. His work as a physician focused primarily on the emerging field of social medicine and forensic medicine but who was also interested cultural politics, literature and music. Gramberg was particularly interested in literature and corresponded with prominent literary figures across Europe that included Gerhard Anton von Halem and was able to develop a significant literary output of his own. He wrote poetry, anthologies, treatises, essays and had a particular love of poetry written in Old High German. He collaborated with von Halem in that respect. Gramberg was a committed opponent of superstition and fanaticism and worked throughout his life to promote the intellectual and cultural movement that was created during the German enlightenment. In 1792, Gramberg was awarded the Cothenius Medal in recognition of his work in the medical field.

== Life ==
Gramberg was born in Oldenburg, then under Danish rule and was the son of the clergyman Anton Gramberg (1695–1770) and Juliane Wilhelmine, née Petersen (1707–1769). He attended the gymnasium in Jever where he became lifelong friends with the education reformer Christian Hinrich Wolke. On 20 April 1763, he matriculated to study medicine and pharmacy at the University of Göttingen from 1762 to 1766 studying primarily with Philipp Georg Schröder. On 1 November 1766, he received his doctorate with a dissertation on Pulmonary hemorrhages titled "De haemoptysi in genere et speciatim ejus nexu cum varia adversa ex hypocnondriis valetudine" (On haemoptysis in general and in particular its connection with various adverse health effects due to hypochondria). Gramberg suffered a lung condition in the first half of his life and the dissertion was in part a reflection of his experiences.

In 1771, he married Margaretha Sophia Janssen (1754–1829). The couple had six sons and four daughters, including the young lawyer and poet Gerhard Anton Hermann Gramberg (1772–1816), who died prematurely.

== Career ==
From June 1767, Gramberg began practicing medicine in Oldenburg (then part of Denmark). Gramberg found the town too small to support him, so instead built a rural practice. On 3 August 1778, he was appointed to the civil service as court and garrison physician with the rank of assessor to Frederick Augustus II, Grand Duke of Oldenburg. On 21 July 1783, he was promoted to the rank of chancery councillor in the civil service. On 5 February 1792, Gramberg, with the nickname Plistonicus V, was elected a member (matriculation number 948) of the German National Academy of Sciences Leopoldina (Leopoldina), likely as the result of an endorsement from friend and colleague Paul Möhring. Gramberg subsequently wrote several publications, written in Latin for the societies journal Acta Eruditorum. In the same year, he was awarded the Cothenius Medal of the Leopoldina. On 6 October 1794, Gramberg was promoted to chief medical officer of the duchy. His work included the training of new medical professional, inspection of pharmacies, the management of a medical practice and conducting preparations in the event of an epidemics, which were frequent.

In 1800 and 1814, Gramberg participated in the implementation of medical reforms. He aimed not only to cure illnesses with medication but also to combat their causes through sound medical advice. Furthermore, he advocated for the introduction of midwifery training and vaccinations and fought against infectious diseases. Alongside his work as a physician, Gramberg, as a proponent of the Enlightenment, dedicated himself to the fight against quackery, prejudice, and the superstition that illnesses were a consequence of witchcraft and magic. He also worked as a publicist in the field of medicine.

== Literary life ==
Gramberg was part of a group of like-minded friends who believed in the German enlightenment, amongst them the essayist and diplomat Helfrich Peter Sturz and botanist and doctor Georg Christian Oeder. Oeder had come to Oldenburg in 1771 after losing his professorship due to variance in state finances and a backlash from anti-enlightenment figures who found work as the town bailiff. Sturz met Gramberg around 1773 when Gramberg presumably became his doctor and would have a profound effect on Grambergs literary and cultural life. Sturz had moved from Copenhagen to Oldenburg in 1773 to become a high-ranking civil servant and would eventually produce his most important work in Oldenburg and eventually marry two of Gramberg's daughters. In 1779, both Gramberg and Halem were founders of a literary society in Oldenburg that consisted of only 12 members. Gramberg edited Sturz second and final collection of work that would have been largely unknown if it wasn't for Gramberg. The group would eventually be joined by writer, lawyer, and civil servant Gerhard Anton von Halem who like Gramberg believed in the French Revolution. The first essay that Gramberg wrote in 1878, was on Sturz' educational background and was published in H.A.O. Reichard's journal Olla Potrida which was well received by the German literati. Both Gramberg and Sturz had a particular love of poetry written in Old High German. Sturz searched for old manuscripts throughout Germany when he travelled and shared them with Gramberg. When Sturz died at a relatively young age, Gramberg turned to the small 12-person society for literary stimulation for the remainder of his life.

By his early middle-age, Gramberg was editing the Oldenburg "Blätter gemischten Inhalts" (Mixed Papers), along with Halem from 1787 to 1797, and the "Oldenburgische Zeitschrift" (Oldenburg Journal), also with Halem from 1804 to 1807.

== Musical life ==
Gramberg played the violin and through his music played a central role in the musical life of Oldenburg, which experienced a significant renaissance in the second half of the 18th century. He would often invite people to his house to play a piece and this led to his establishing a concert series for amateur musicians, first held in the winter of 1868. It became an event, held every Wednesday during the winter months. He also formed a musical ensemble of some 20 people, consisting of musicians from the town and an amateur choir. The emsemble began playing concerts for the Duke, the first held on 24 March 1769, that became a regular event in Oldenburg known as the "Good Friday Concert". In 1782, Gramberg wrote a cantata that was set to music by Carl M. Meineke. (Note: The composition was lost and is only known about through Gramberg's writings.)

=== Library ===
Gramberg possessed an unusually large specialist library for the time, comprising 5,295 volumes, 2,114 of which were in the medical field. These volumes are now housed in the Oldenburg State Library.

== Bibliography ==
The Oldenburg State Library has many digital copies of Gramberg's publications, including:

- von Halem, G. A.; Gramberg, Gerhard Anton, eds. (1804–1807). Oldenburgische Zeitschrift (in German). Oldenburg: I.P. Schulze.
- Gramberg, Gerhard Anton (1808). Über die zeither im Herzogthum Oldenburg bemerkten, ungewöhnlich häufigen Krankheiten und Todesfälle, ihre Ursachen, und in wiefern solchen künftig möglichst vorzubeugen sey [On the unusually frequent illnesses and deaths observed in the Duchy of Oldenburg, their causes, and how such things can be prevented in the future.] (in German). Oldenburg.
- Gramberg, Gerhard Anton (1814). Maßregeln gegen die Verbreitung einer Pocken-Epidemie [Measures against the spread of a smallpox epidemic] (in German). Oldenburg: I. P. Schulze.
