= Cornelis Johannes Vos =

Dutch physician and politician

Cornelis Johannes Vos (also known as Cornelius Johann Voss, Cornelius Johann Vos, Cornelius Joannes Vos; born 20 March 1768 in Montfoort, Utrecht; died 2 July 1819 in Batavia) was a Dutch physician and politician.

== Life ==
Vos was born one of nine children of Jacob Albert Vos and Jacoba Maria de Joncheere. His father was a Reformed pastor in Montfoort, became pastor in Zaltbommel on 26 June 1768, and was Professor of Theology at Utrecht University from 4 December 1769, to 20 January 1794. Vos matriculated at this university in 1788 and received his medical doctorate on 11 June 1789.

Around 1791, he was a physician in The Hague.[7] In 1792, he was awarded the Cothenius Medal from the Imperial Academy of Natural Scientists (Leopoldina) for a paper on the "Über den richtigen Begriff und die zweckmäßige Behandlung der Krankheiten der ersten Wege" (On the correct terminology and appropriate treatment of diseases of the upper respiratory tract)

== Career ==
Vos, considered a moderate, was a member of the Provisional City Council from 25 January to 4 May 1795, and, following his election on 21 April 1795, a member of the Utrecht City Council from 4 May 1795, to 22 February 1796. He was a member of its Committee for Public Instruction. From 24 November 1795, to 1 March 1796, he was a deputy for Utrecht in the States General of the Republic of the Seven United Provinces. He also represented Utrecht on the Committee for East India Trade and Possessions from 4 January 1796, to 15 May 1800. Like many members of this committee, he was a Freemason. Vos was a member of the government of the Department of Utrecht from 4 June 1802, to 1 August 1805 (re-elected on 18 August 1804) and from 29 September 1805, to May 1807.

Vos married Cornelia Adriana Johanna Vos, the daughter of Johannes Vos and Ida Wilhelmina Bake, in 1791.

== Bibliography ==
- Vos, Cornelis Johannes (1799). Specimen physico-medicum inaugurale de nutritione imprimis nervosa [Inaugural physico-medical specimen on nutrition, especially nervous.] (Pro Gradu Doctoratus thesis). Utrecht: ex officina Abrahami à Paddenburg, academiae typographi.
- Vos, Cornelius Johannes (1791). Genees- en heelkundige verhandeling over het been en spek-gezwel: byzonder dat, waardoor de rugwervelen worden aangedaan, en eene verstyving der onderste ledematen veroorzaakt word [Medical and surgical treatise on bone and fatty tumors: particularly those affecting the vertebrae and causing stiffening of the lower limbs.] (in Dutch). Utrecht: Wild.
