= Armin von Tschermak-Seysenegg =

Austrian physiologist (1870–1952)

Image of von Tschermak-Seysenegg taken in 1901

Armin Eduard Gustav Tschermak, Edler von Seysenegg (21 September 1870 – 9 October 1952) was an Austrian physiologist. He was an elder son of the Moravia-born mineralogist Gustav Tschermak von Seysenegg. He was instrumental in helping his botanist-brother Erich von Tschermak-Seysenegg in the rediscovery of Mendel's laws of genetics. He was Professor of Physiology at the University of Veterinary Medicine Vienna and the Institute of Physiology in Prague. He was elected member to the Pontifical Academy of Sciences on 28 October 1936.

== Biography ==
The first son of Austrian mineralogist Gustav Tschermak von Seysenegg, Armin Tschermak-Seysenegg was born in Vienna, Austria. He studied medicine at the University of Vienna and at the University of Heidelberg in Germany. He earned his medical degree from Vienna in 1895, after which he worked in Leipzig. He joined the faculty of University of Halle (Martin Luther University of Halle-Wittenberg) in 1899. In 1902 he was appointed adjunct professor, the post he held till 1906. In 1907 he returned to Vienna to become full Profossor of Physiology and Medicine at the University of Veterinary Medicine Vienna, where he helped to establish the Veterinary College. He was the Rector of the institute between 1909 and 1911. He was offered professorship at the Institute of Physiology (now under Charles University in Prague), which he joined in 1913. He was subsequently appointed Director of the institute. He taught at Charles University until the very end of World War II in 1945. He died on 9 October 1952 in Bad Wiessee in Bavaria.

== Contributions ==
Armin Tschermak-Seysenegg was elected member of several scientific societies and academies in Europe. He was editor of Zeitschrift für Physiologie, Zeitschrift für Sinnesphysiologie and Archiv für Augenheilkunde. In 1936 he was appointed to the Pontifical Academy of Sciences, together with the Nobel laureates Thomas Hunt Morgan, Peter J.W. Debye, and Victor Francis Hess.

== Recognition ==
The University of Veterinary Medicine Vienna offers Armin Tschermak von Seysenegg Prize every year to young academics with outstanding works. As of 2014, the prize carries €5,000.
