= Johannes Walther =

German geologist (1860 – 1937)

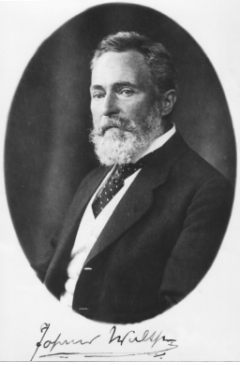
- Born: July 20, 1860; Neustadt an der Orla, Saxe-Weimar-Eisenach
- Died: May 4, 1937 (aged 76); Bad Hofgastein, Germany
- Education: University of Jena, University of Halle
- Known for: Walther's Law
- Scientific career
- Fields: Geology, Palaeontology
- Workplaces: University of Jena

Johannes Walther (July 20, 1860 – May 4, 1937) was a German geologist who discovered important principles of stratigraphy, including Walther's Law.

== Early life and work ==
Walther came from a religious home and studied botany, zoology, and philosophy at the University of Jena. In 1882 he successfully completed this course with a doctorate. Then he studied geology and palaeontology in Leipzig and later Munich.

The following year he worked at the Stazione Zoologica in Naples as a lecturer, staying for two years. Among other things, he ran extensive sedimentological and biological studies.

In 1885 he returned to Jena and habilitated there in 1886 with a thesis on crinoids. After travelling, he was appointed as a professor at Jena in 1890.

== Later life ==
Walther moved to the University of Halle in 1906, staying until 1929. Whilst there, he was in 1924 elected president of the prestigious German Academy of Sciences Leopoldina, an office he held until 1931.

== Publications ==
- The Law of Desertification in the Present and the Past (Das Gesetz der Wüstenbildung in Gegenwart und Vorzeit), 2007 reprint
- Modern Lithogenesis, 1883–84
- Introduction to geology as a historical science (Einleitung in die Geologie als historische Wissenschaft), 1893–94
- History of the Earth and Life, (Geschichte der Erde und des Lebens), 1908
- General Palaeontology (Allgemeine Paläontologie), 1919–1927
- Literature by and about Johannes Walther in the German National Library catalogue
