= Erich von Tschermak =

Austrian geneticist (1871–1962)

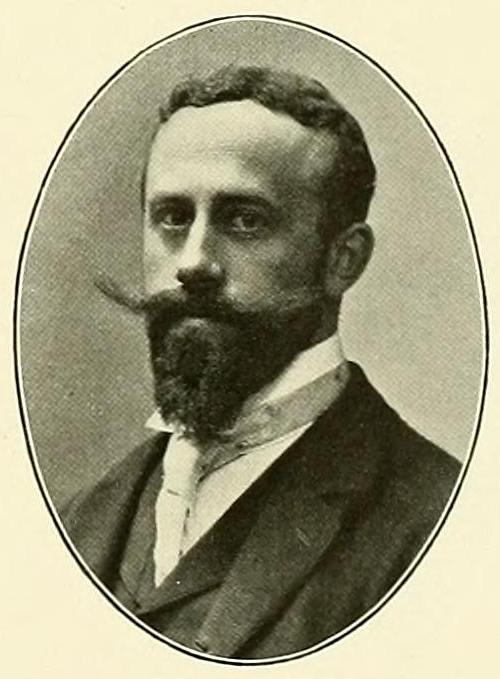
- Erich Tschermak-Seysenegg
- Born: 15 November 1871; Vienna, Austrian Empire
- Died: 11 October 1962 (aged 90); Vienna, Austria
- Education: University of Halle
- Known for: Developing disease-resistant crops
- Father: Gustav Tschermak von Seysenegg
- Relatives: Eduard Fenzl, grandfather, Armin von Tschermak-Seysenegg, brother
- Awards: Honorary doctorate from the University of Vienna, Austrian Decoration for Science and Art
- Scientific career
- Fields: Agronomy
- Workplaces: University of Agricultural Sciences Vienna
- Doctoral advisor: Carl Nägeli

Erich Tschermak, Edler von Seysenegg (15 November 1871 – 11 October 1962) was an Austrian agronomist who developed several new disease-resistant crops, including wheat-rye and oat hybrids. He was a son of the Moravia-born mineralogist Gustav Tschermak von Seysenegg. His maternal grandfather was the botanist, Eduard Fenzl, who taught Gregor Mendel botany during his student days in Vienna.

He received his doctorate from the University of Halle, Germany, in 1896. Tschermak accepted a teaching position at the University of Agricultural Sciences Vienna in 1901, and became professor there five years later, in 1900. Von Tschermak is one of four men—see also Hugo de Vries, Carl Correns and William Jasper Spillman—who independently rediscovered Gregor Mendel's work on genetics. Von Tschermak published his findings in June, 1900. His works in genetics were largely influenced by his brother Armin von Tschermak-Seysenegg.

== Decorations and awards ==
- Member Royal Swedish Academy of Agriculture (1912)
- Honorary doctorate from the University of Vienna (1950)
- Member Royal Swedish Academy of Physiography (1951)
- Ring of Honour of the City of Vienna (1951)
- Austrian Decoration for Science and Art
