= Cothenius Medal =

Award given by the German National Academy of Sciences Leopoldina

Leopoldina Cothenius Medal
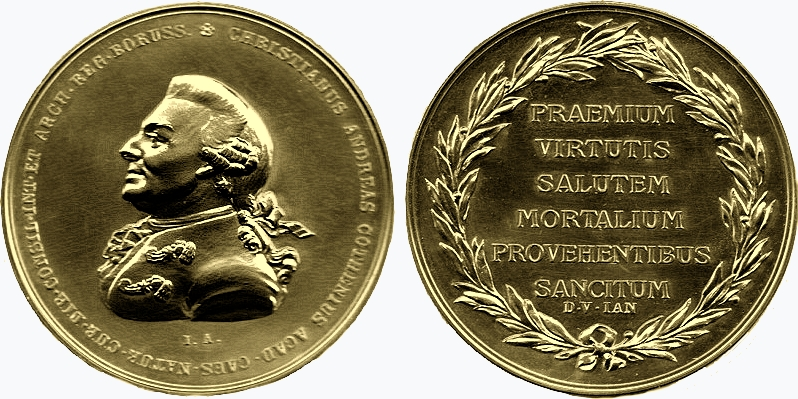
- The Cothenius medal
- Awarded for: Outstanding research in any branch of science
- Sponsored by: German National Academy of Sciences Leopoldina
- Country: Germany
- First award: 1792; 234 years ago
- Website: Cothenius Medal

Cothenius Medal is a medal awarded by the German National Academy of Sciences Leopoldina (known as the Leopoldina) for outstanding scientific achievement during the life of the awardee. The medal was created to honour Christian Andreas Cothenius, who was the personal physician to Frederick the Great. In 1743, Cothenius became a fellow of the Leopoldina, later president of the learned society that had been created by Emperor Leopold I. When Cothenius died, he left a sum of money in his will to the society with the condition that the interest on the money should be used to award a gold medal, every two years by answering a question in medicine whereby some new truth could be established. Up until 1864, the award came with a prize but was then converted into an award for the promotion of research over the whole period of a person's life. Each medal bears the Latin inscription "Praemium virtutis salutem mortalium provehentibus sancitum" (Created in recognition of the ability of those who promote the good of mortals).

== Cothenius Medal awardees, 1959–Present ==
| Year | Image | Laureate | Discipline | City | Ref |
|---|---|---|---|---|---|
| 2025 | | Kai Simons (born 1938) | Biochemistry/cell biology | Dresden | |
| 2024 | | Roger S. Goody (born 1944) | Biochemistry | Dortmund | |
| 2023 | | Jürgen Troe (born 1940) | Physical Chemistry | Göttingen | |
| 2021 | | Rudolf K. Thauer (born 1939) | Microbiology/Immunology | Marburg | |
| 2021 | | Werner Kühlbrandt (born 1951) | Biochemistry/Structural Biology | Frankfurt | |
| 2019 | | Klaus Müllen (born 1947) | Chemistry | Mainz | |
| 2019 | | Walter Neupert (1939–2019) | Biochemistry and cell biology | Martinsried | |
| 2017 | | Fritz Melchers (born 1936) | Cell biology | Berlin | |
| 2017 | | Joachim Trümper (born 1933) | X-ray astronomy | Garching | |
| 2015 | | Herbert Gleiter (born 1938) | Physics | Karlsruhe | |
| 2015 | | Otto Ludwig Lange (1927–2017) | Biology | Würzburg | |
| 2013 | | Gunter S. Fischer (born 1943) | Chemistry | Halle | |
| 2013 | | Wolf Singer (born 1943) | Neurosciences | Frankfurt | |
| 2011 | | Bert Hölldobler (born 1936) | Zoology | Würzburg | |
| 2011 | | Anna M. Wobus (born 1945) | Human genetics and molecular medicine | Gatersleben | |
| 2011 | | Ulrich Wobus (born 1942) | Genetics/Molecular Biology | Gatersleben | |
| 2009 | | Karl Decker (1925–2024) | Biochemistry | | |
| 2009 | | Eduard Seidler (1929–2020) | History of medicine | | |
| 2007 | | Klaus Wolff (1935–2019) | Dermatology | Vienna | |
| 2007 | | Sigrid Doris Peyerimhoff (born 1937) | Physical chemistry | Bonn | |
| 2005 | | Hans Günter Schlegel (1924–2013) | Microbiology | Göttingen | |
| 2005 | | Alfred Gierer (born 1929) | Molecular biologist | | |
| 2003 | | Ernst J. M. Helmreich (1922–2017) | Biochemistry | Würzburg | |
| 2003 | | Benno Parthier (1932–2019) | Cell biology | | |
| 2003 | | Andreas Oksche (1926–2017) | Anatomy | Giessen | |
| 2001 | | Leopold Horner (1911–2005) | Chemistry | Mainz | |
| 2001 | | Heinz Jagodzinski (1916–2012) | Physics | Munich | |
| 2000 | | Hans Mohr (1930–2016) | Plant physiologist | Freiburg | |
| 1999 | | Rudolf Rott (1926–2003) | Veterinary medicine | Giessen | |
| 1999 | | Dorothea Kuhn (1923–2015) | History of science and medicine | Marbach | |
| 1997 | | Otto Braun-Falco (1922–2018) | Dermatology | Munich | |
| 1997 | | Friedrich Hirzebruch (1927–2012) | Mathematics | Bonn | |
| 1995 | | Wilhelm Doerr (1914–1996) | Pathology | Heidelberg | |
| 1995 | | Gottfried Möllenstedt (1912–1997) | Physics | Tübingen | |
| 1995 | | Dietrich Schneider (1919–2008) | Zoology | Starnberg | |
| 1993 | | Wolfgang Gerok ( (1926–2021) | Internal Medicine | Freiburg | |
| 1993 | | Bernhard Hassenstein (1922–2016) | Zoologie | Freiburg | |
| 1991 | | Heinz Röhrer (1905–1992) | Veterinary Medicine | Rathenow | |
| 1991 | | Albert Eschenmoser (1925–2023) | Chemistry | Küsnacht | |
| 1989 | | Sir Bernhard Katz (1911–2003) | Physiology | London | |
| 1989 | | Jürgen Tonndorf (1914–1989) | Otorhinolaryngology | New York | |
| 1989 | | Heinz Bethge (1919–2001) | Physics | | |
| 1987 | | Rostislaw Kaischew (1908–1990) | Physical Chemistry | Sofia | |
| 1987 | | Adolf Watznauer (1907–1995) | Geology | Karl-Marx-Stadt | |
| 1985 | | Konrad Zuse (1910–1995) | Computer technology | Hünfeld | |
| 1985 | | Hermann Flohn (1912–1997) | Climatology | Bonn | |
| 1983 | | Wolf von Engelhardt (1910–2008) | Mineralogy | Tübingen | |
| 1983 | | Erna Lesky (1911–1986) | History of Medicine | Innsbruck | |
| 1980 | | Wilhelm Jost (1903–1988) | Physical Chemistry | Göttingen | |
| 1980 | | Peter Friedrich Matzen (1909–1986) | Orthopaedics | Leipzig | |
| 1977 | | Wolfgang Gentner (1906–1980) | Physics | Heidelberg | |
| 1977 | | Arnold Graffi (1910–2006) | General Biology | Berlin | |
| 1975 | | Ilya Prigogine (1917–1988) | Physical Chemistry | Brussels/Austin | |
| 1975 | | Ernst Ruska (1906–1996) | Physics | Berlin | |
| 1974 | | Viktor Ambartsumian (1908–1996) | Astronomy | Yerevan | |
| 1973 | | Albrecht Unsöld (1905–1995) | Astronomy | Kiel | |
| 1972 | | Erwin Reichenbach (1897–1973) | Stomatology | | |
| 1971 | | Otto Kratky (1902–1995) | Physical Chemistry | Graz | |
| 1971 | | Friedrich Hund (1896–1997) | Göttingen | Physics | |
| 1969 | | Pavel Alexandrov (1896–1982) | Mathematics | Moscow | |
| 1969 | | Helmut Hasse (1898–1979) | Mathematics | Hamburg | |
| 1969 | | Bartel Leendert van der Waerden (1903 - 1996) | Mathematics | Zürich | |
| 1967 | | Vladimir Engelgardt (1894–1984) | Physiological Chemistry | Moscow | |
| 1967 | | Karl Lohmann (1898–1978) | Physiological Chemistry | Berlin | |
| 1966 | | Archibald Vivian Hill (1886–1977) | Physiology | Cambridge (GB) | |
| 1965 | | Hans Hermann Bennhold (1893–1976) | Internal Medicine | Tübingen | |
| 1965 | | Ernst Derra (1901–1979) | Surgery | Düsseldorf | |
| 1964 | | Wolfgang von Buddenbrock-Hettersdorff (1884–1964) | Zoology | Mainz | |
| 1961 | | Max Bürger (1885–1966) | Internal Medicine | Leipzig | |
| 1960 | | Kurt Mothes (1900–1983) | Botany | Halle | |
| 1960 | | John Eccles (1903–1997) | Physiology | Canberra | |
| 1959 | | George de Hevesy (1885–1966) | Physical Chemistry | Stockholm | |
| 1959 | | Pyotr Kapitsa (1894–1984) | Physics | Moscow | |
