= Nitra Region =

Region of Slovakia

Nitra Region Nitriansky kraj
- Region
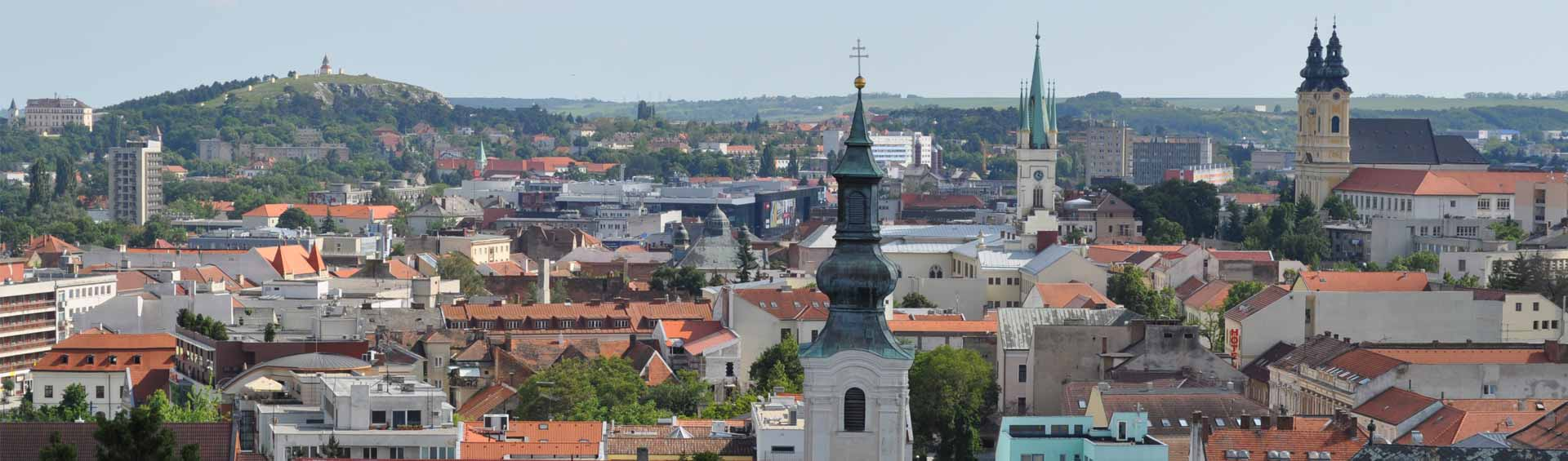
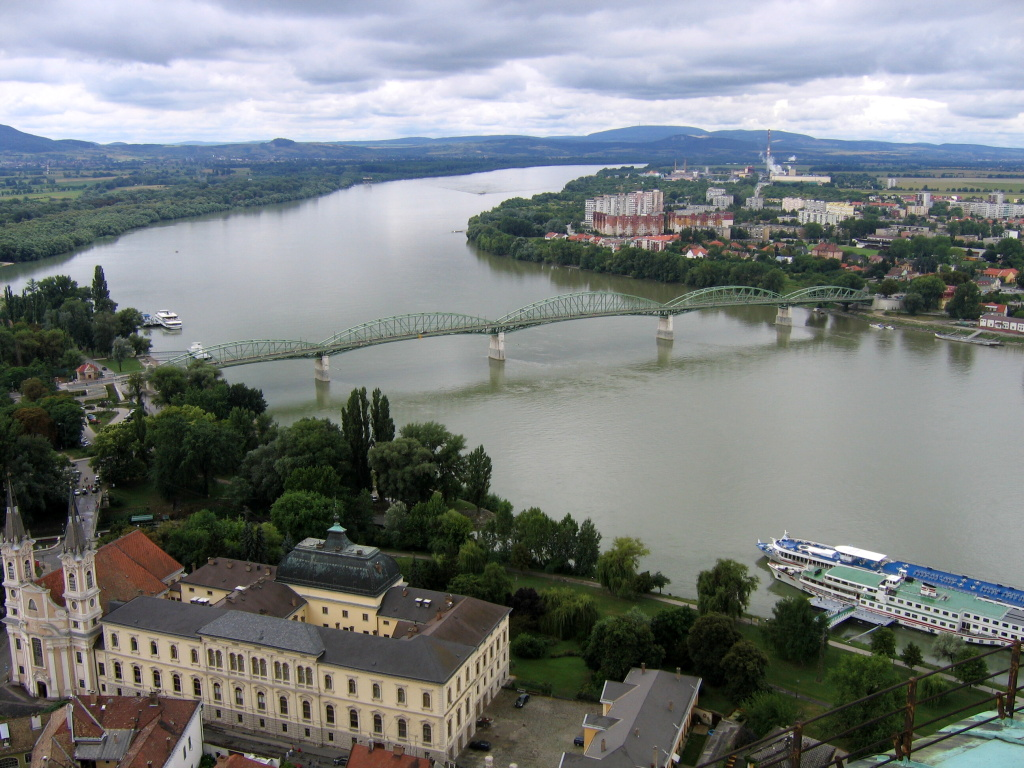
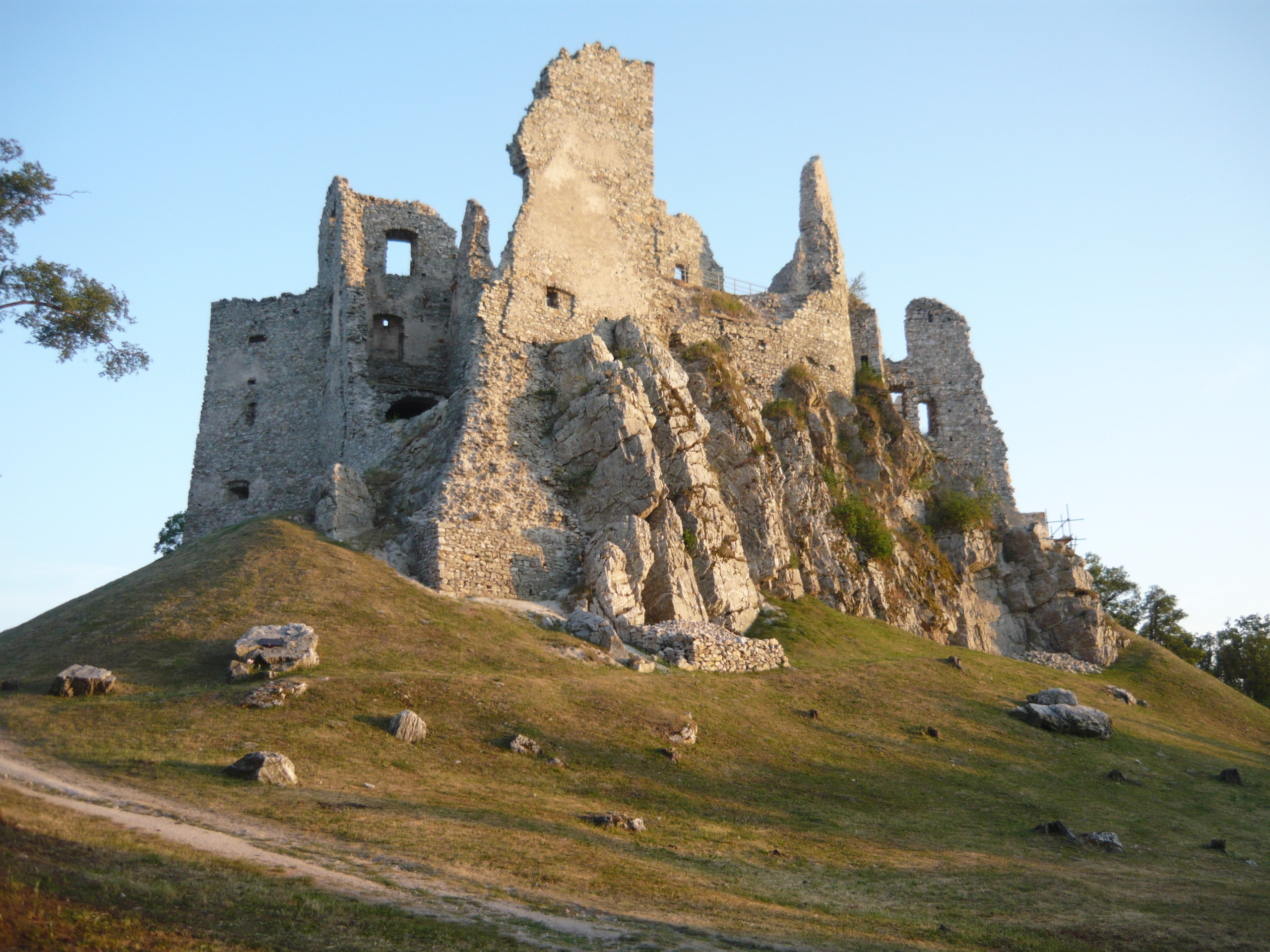
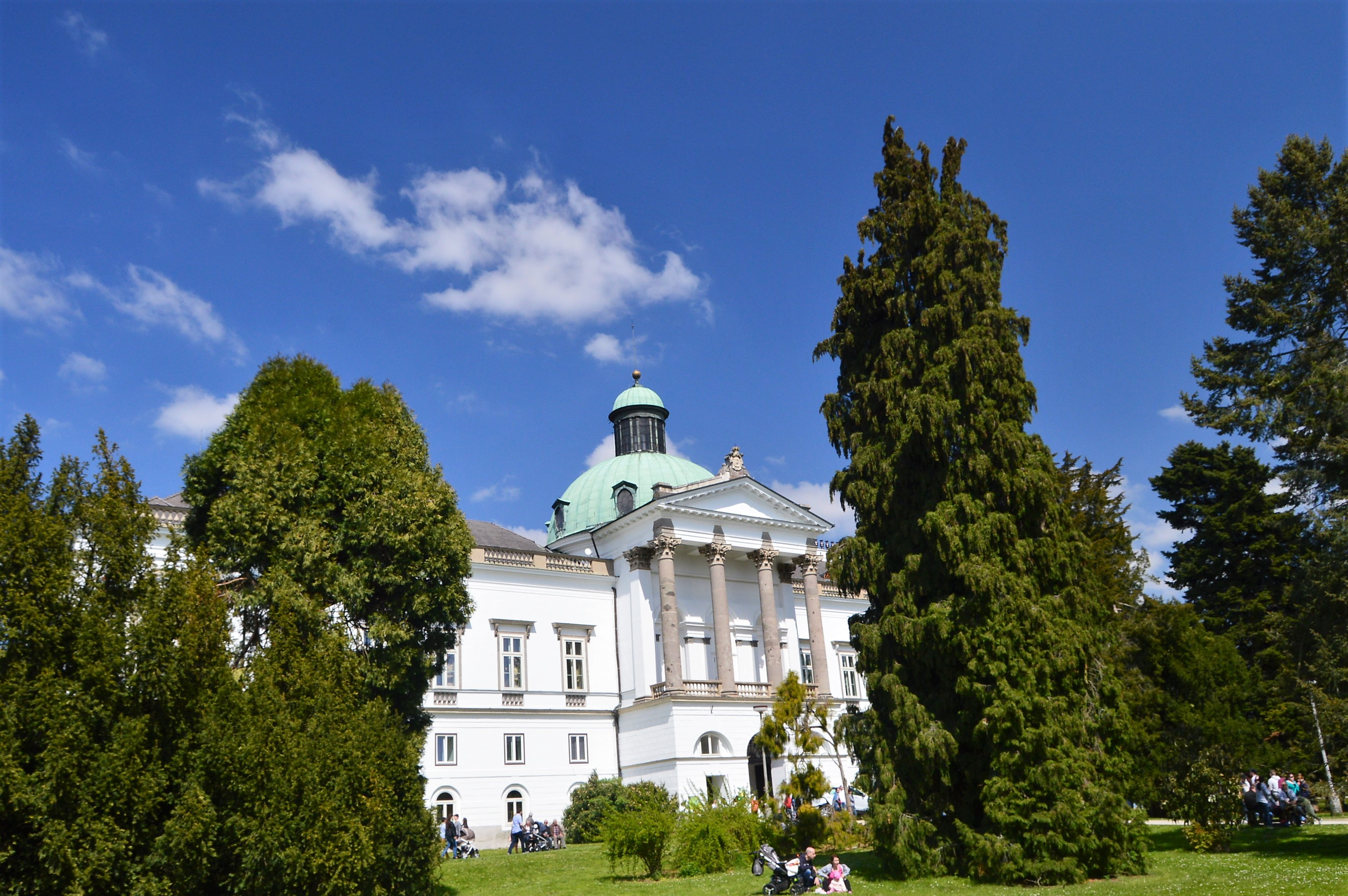
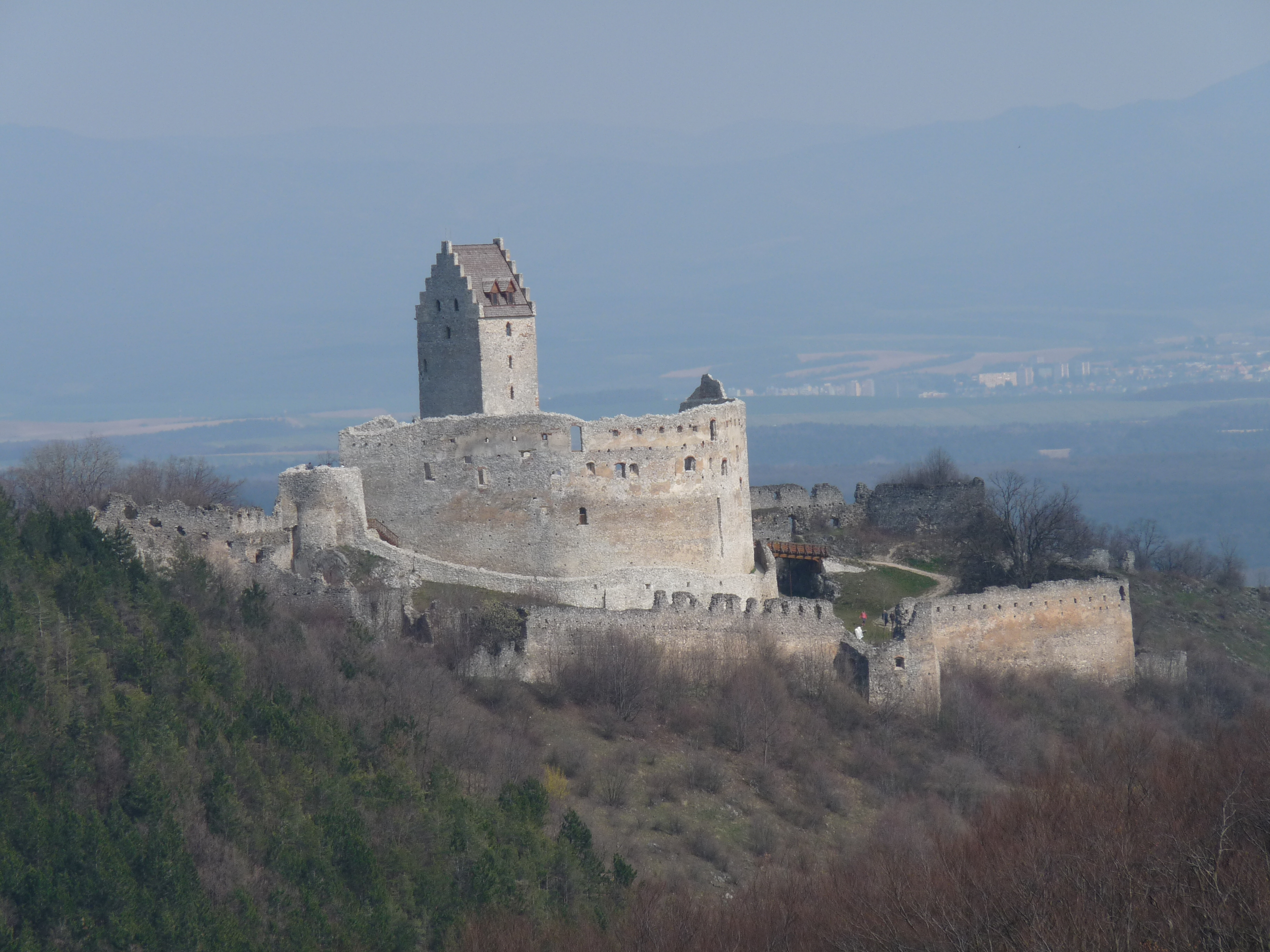
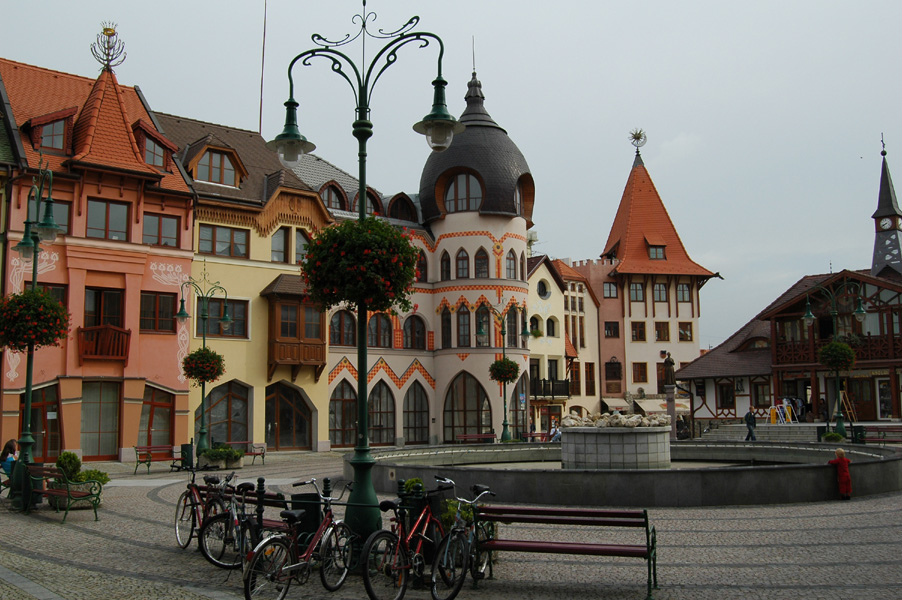
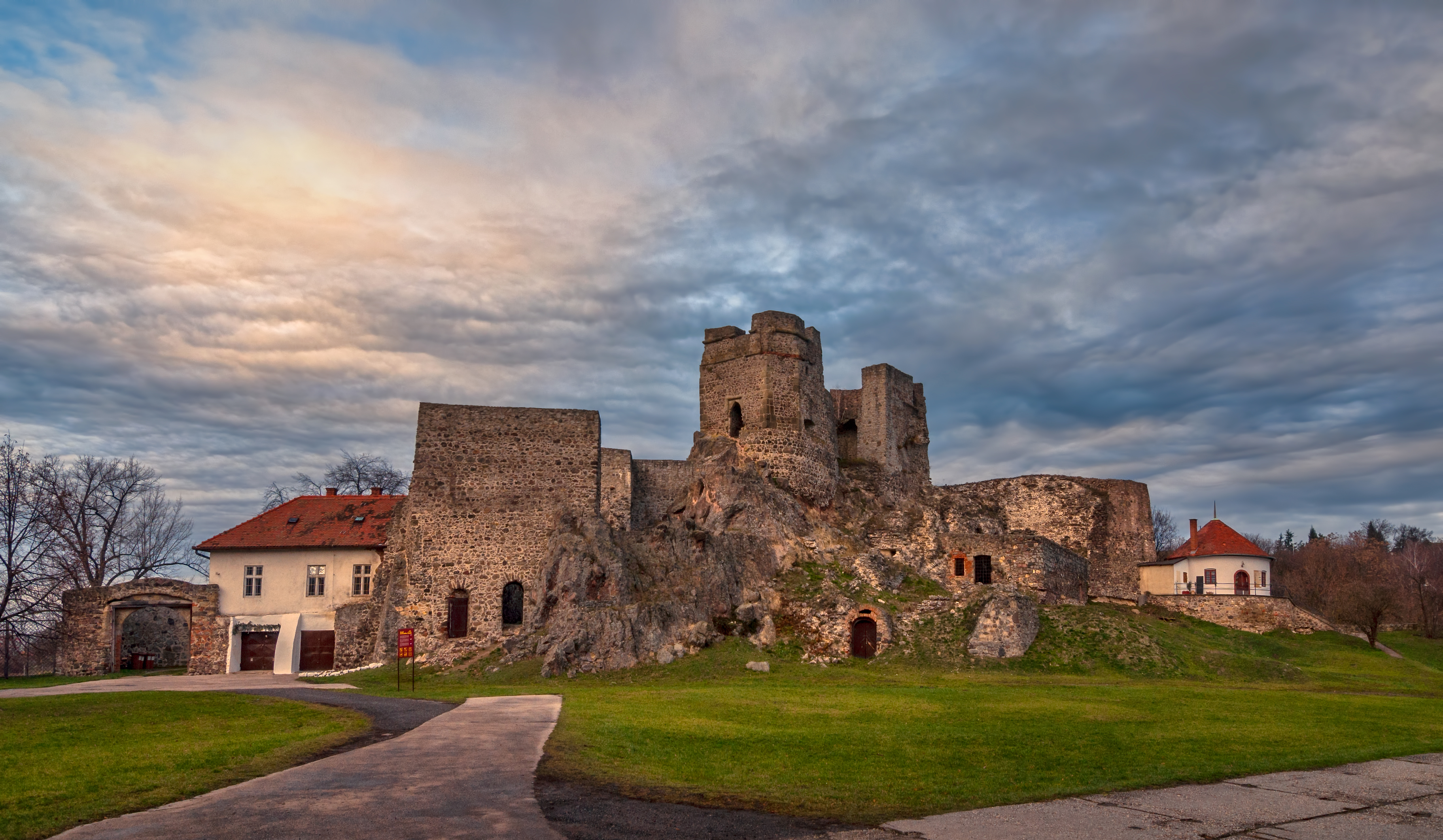
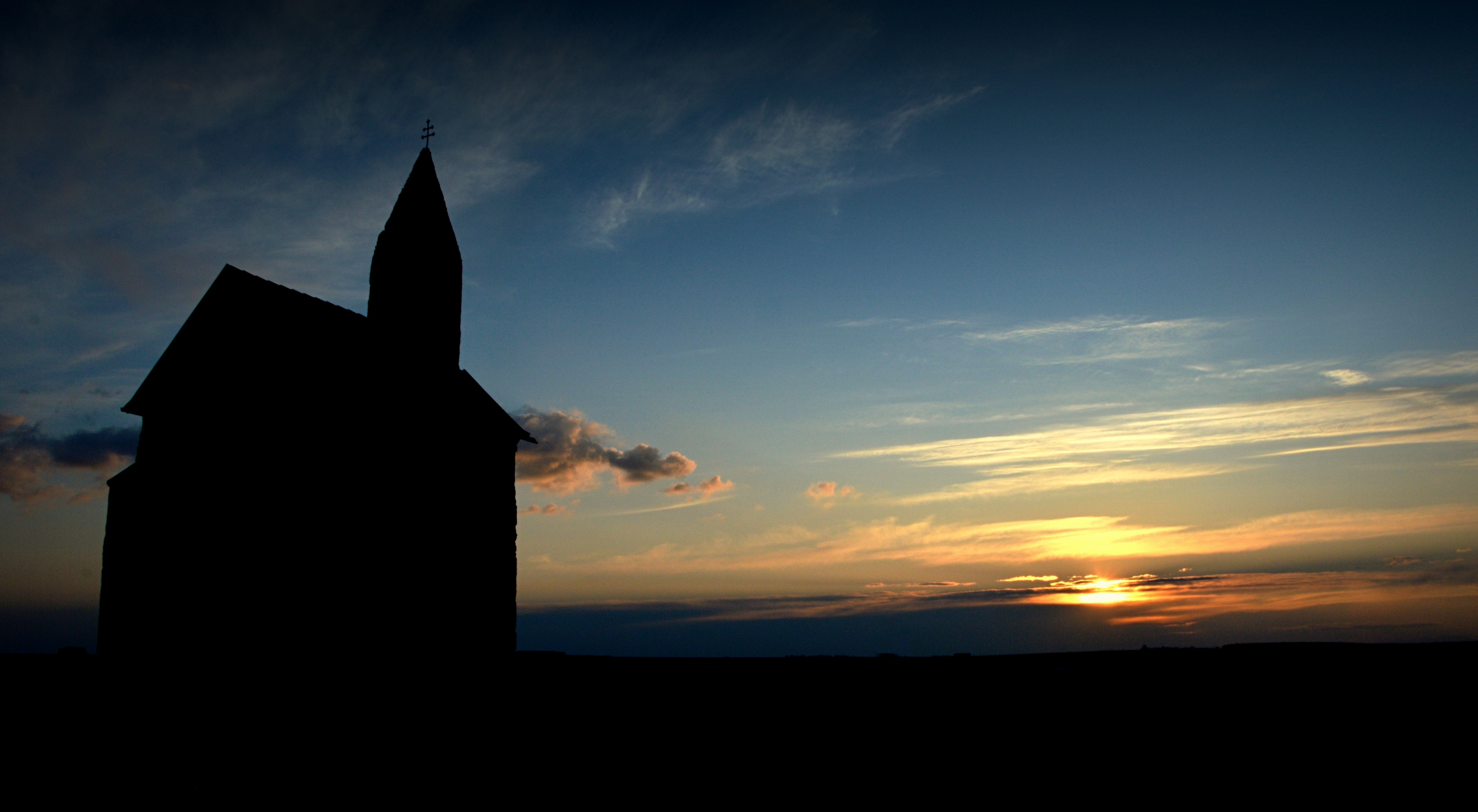
- From the top to bottom-left; Panoramic view of Nitra, Štúrovo - Bridge of Mária Valéria, Hrušov Castle, Topoľčianky chateau, Topoľčany Castle, Komárno city centre, Levice Castle and Dražovce church

- Flag Coat of arms

- Nitra Region
- Country: Slovakia
- Capital: Nitra

Government
  - Body: County Council of Nitra Region
  - Governor: Branislav Becík (Voice)

Area
  - Total: 6,343.71 km^{2} (2,449.32 sq mi)
- Highest elevation: 943 m (3,094 ft)

Population (2025)
  - Total: 661,995

GDP
  - Total: €8.801 billion (2016)
  - Per capita: €12,925 (2016)
- Time zone: UTC+1 (CET)
  - Summer (DST): UTC+2 (CEST)
- ISO 3166 code: SK-NI
- Website: www.unsk.sk

The Nitra Region (Slovak: Nitriansky kraj, pronounced [ˈɲitrɪɐnski ˈkraj]; Hungarian: Nyitrai kerület) is one of the administrative regions of Slovakia. It was first established in 1923 and from 1996 exists in its present borders. It consists of seven districts (okres) and 354 municipalities, of which 16 have a town status. The economy of the region focuses more on agriculture, than in other Slovak regions. Nitra is its seat, largest city, and cultural and economic center.

== Geography ==
This region with a long history is situated in the southwest of Slovakia, mostly in the eastern part of the Danubian Lowland. It is divided into two sub-units: the Danubian Flat in the south-west, with eastern part of the Žitný ostrov island, and the Danubian Hills in the north, centre and east. Mountain ranges reaching into the region are: Považský Inovec in the north-west, where the region's highest point, Veľký Inovec, is located, Tribeč in the north from Nitra, Pohronský Inovec in the north-east and Štiavnické vrchy in the east. Major rivers are the Danube in the south, Váh in the south-west, Nitra in the western-central part, Hron in the east and Ipeľ in the south-east. As for administrative divisions, the region borders Trenčín Region in the north, Banská Bystrica Region in the east, Hungarian Pest in the south-east, Komárom-Esztergom in the south, and Győr-Moson-Sopron county in the south-west and Trnava Region in the west.

== Population ==
Historical population
Year	Pop.	±%
1970	678,733	—
1980	708,634	+4.4%
1991	716,846	+1.2%
2001	713,422	−0.5%
2011	689,867	−3.3%
2021	677,900	−1.7%
Source: Censuses

Population statistic (10 years)
Year	1995	2005	2015	2025
Count	717,624	708,498	682,527	661,995
Difference		−1.27%	−3.66%	−3.00%

Population statistic
Year	2024	2025
Count	665,600	661,995
Difference		−0.54%

It has a population of 661,995 people (31 December 2025). The population density in the region is 104.35/km^{2} (270.3/sq mi) (2025), which is very similar to the country's average (110 per km^{2}). The largest towns are Nitra, Komárno, Nové Zámky and Levice.

=== Ethnicity ===
Census 2021 (1+%)
Ethnicity	Number	Fraction
Slovak	484,494	71.46%
Hungarian	160,584	23.68%
Not found out	44,853	6.61%
Total	677,900	

In year 2021 was 677,900 people by ethnicity 484,494 as Slovak, 160,584 as Hungarian, 44,853 as Not found out, 5478 as Romani, 4290 as Czech, 1971 as Other, 904 as Russian, 583 as Ukrainian, 524 as German, 481 as Polish, 440 as Rusyn, 386 as Vietnamese, 315 as Italian, 268 as Romanian, 170 as Chinese, 169 as English, 166 as Jewish, 164 as Moravian, 156 as Serbian, 153 as Croatian, 147 as Bulgarian, 120 as Turkish, 115 as Austrian, 114 as Albanian, 77 as Greek, 64 as French, 56 as Canadian, 53 as Irish, 18 as Korean, 16 as Silesian and 7 as Iranian.

Note on population: The difference values of population numbers in the table "Population statistic" and in the sections "Ethnicity" & "Religion" is caused by the use of various statistical methods.

=== Religion ===
Census 2021 (1+%)
Religion	Number	Fraction
Roman Catholic Church	413,458	60.99%
None	155,832	22.99%
Not found out	47,485	7%
Calvinist Church	24,210	3.57%
Evangelical Church	17,825	2.63%
Total	677,900	

In year 2021 was 677,900 people by religion 413,458 from Roman Catholic Church, 155,832 from None, 47,485 from Not found out, 24,210 from Calvinist Church, 17,825 from Evangelical Church, 4204 from Greek Catholic Church, 2763 from Christian Congregations in Slovakia, 1817 from Ad hoc movements, 1657 from Other, 1522 from Jehovah's Witnesses, 1117 from Other and not ascertained christian church, 975 from Eastern Orthodox Church, 759 from Buddhism, 684 from Baptists Church, 676 from Church of the Brethren, 638 from Apostolic Church, 497 from Paganism and natural spirituality, 462 from Islam, 412 from Old Catholic Church, 309 from United Methodist Church, 181 from Jewish community, 175 from Seventh-day Adventist Church, 112 from Hinduism, 52 from Church of Jesus Christ of Latter-day Saints, 50 from Czechoslovak Hussite Church, 22 from Bahá'i Community and 6 from New Apostolic Church.

== Economy and climate ==
The city of Nitra is also the centre of whole region. The region—which is the warmest in Slovakia—reaches a high production of wheat, rye and vegetables. Significant industries are: the food industry, with breweries in Topoľčany, Nitra and Hurbanovo, are machinery (fridges in Zlaté Moravce, shipyards in Komárno) and energy (Mochovce Nuclear Power Plant).

== Politics ==
Current governor of Banská Bystrica region is Milan Belica (Smer-SD). He won with 34,1 %. In election 2017 was elected also regional parliament:

Nitra Region is known to be a strong hold of Hungarian Parties such as SMK/MKP.

County Council of Nitra region

Type
- Type: Unicameral
- Houses: County Council

Leadership
- Governor: Branislav Becík, Voice

Structure
- Seats: 54
- Political groups: Alliance (18) Centre-right group (14) Independent group (11) Direction/National Party (6) Voice/We Are Family (5)

Elections
- Last election: 29 October 2022

Meeting place
- Nitra

Website
- Council of Nitra region

=== 2017 elections ===
In governor's elections won Milan Belica (Smer–SD) over many another candidates.

Political party	Seats won	+/-	Percentage	Electoral leader
Coalition led by Smer–SD	17	▼4	31,48 %	Jozef Dvonč
Independents	15	▲11	27,77 %	Peter Oremus
SMK-MKP	11	▼3	20,37 %	Miklós Viola
Centre-right coalition	10	▼4	18,51 %	Ján Greššo
ĽSNS	1	▲1	1,85 %	Milan Uhrík

=== 2013 elections ===
In governor's elections won Milan Belica (Smer–SD) over centre-right candidate Tomáš Galbavý (SDKÚ–DS), who was supported by SaS, OKS, NOVA, Most–Híd, SMK-MKP.

Parties and coalitions	%	Seats	+/-
Social Democrats	35.19	19	▲4
Christian Democrats	24.07	13	▲6
Smer–SD, KDH	59.26	32	▲10
SMK–MKP	25.93	14	▲1
SMK–MKP	25.93	14	▲1
Independents	7.41	4	▲1
Independents	7.41	4	▲1
SDKÚ–DS	1.85	1	▼8
Most–Híd	1.85	1	▲1
NOVA	1.85	1	▲1
SDKÚ–DS, OKS, SaS, NOVA, Most–Híd	5.55	3	▼6
Nationalists	1.85	1	▲1
SNS	1.85	1	▲1

=== 2009 elections ===
In governor's elections won Milan Belica (Smer–SD), who was supported by SDKÚ–DS and KDH.

Political party	Seats won	+/-	Percentage	Electoral leader
Smer–SD	15	▲4	27,78 %	Jozef Dvonč
SMK-MKP	13	▼4	24,07 %	Arpád Horváth
SDKÚ–DS	9	▲4	16,67 %	Tibor Tóth
KDH	7	0	12,96 %	Ján Vančo
ĽS–HZDS	7	▼3	12,96 %	Lýdia Forrová
Independents	3	▲3	5,56 %	Anton Marek

=== 2005 elections ===
In governor's elections won Milan Belica, who was supported by ASV, KSS, ĽB, ĽS–HZDS, PSNS, ZSNS. His rival in second round of elections was Ján Greššo (DS, SDKÚ).

Political party	Seats won	+/-	Percentage	Electoral leader
SMK-MKP	17	▼14	32,69 %	László Fekete
Smer–SD	11	▼9	21,15 %	Juraj Horváth
ĽS–HZDS	10	▼10	19,23 %	Jozef Hasilla
KDH	7	▲7	13,46 %	Ján Vančo
SDKÚ	5	▲5	9,62 %	Tibor Tóth
SNS	1	▲1	1,92 %	Igor Varga
HZD	1	▲1	1,92 %	Albert Hačko

=== 2001 elections ===
In governor's elections won Milan Belica, who was supported by HZDS, SOP, SDĽ and Centre party. His rival in second round of elections was Miklós Fehér (SMK-MKP).

Political party	Seats won	Percentage	Electoral leader
SMK-MKP	31	59,62 %	Tibor Bastrnák
Centre-left coalition	20	38,46 %	Jozef Dvonč
SNS	1	1,92 %	Peter Lisý

== Administrative divisions ==
The Nitra Region consists of 7 districts. There are 354 municipalities, of which 16 are towns.

District	Area [km^{2}]	Population
Komárno	1100.14	98,217
Levice	1551.12	107,319
Nitra	870.71	164,220
Nové Zámky	1347.03	133,309
Šaľa	355.90	49,514
Topoľčany	597.62	68,831
Zlaté Moravce	521.16	40,585

Population and area values are current for year 2025.

== Places of interest ==
- Nitra with Nitra Castle and Saint Emmeram's Cathedral, Nitra Synagogue, Dražovce church, etc.
- Medieval churches in Kostoľany pod Tribečom and Nitrianska Blatnica
- Chateau and European bison sanctuary in Topoľčianky (Topoľčianska zubria zvernica)
- Šaľa - town with a castle
- The water mill and bridge in Kolárovo
- Komárno with its fortification system, fortress, Elisabeth bridge, etc.
- Iža - Roman military camp Celemantia - UNESCO World Heritage Site
- Štúrovo - Bridge of Mária Valéria
- Levice with Levice Castle, Saint Michael's Church, Levice Town Hall etc.
- Arboretum in Tesárske Mlyňany
- Dunajské luhy Protected Landscape Area
- Ponitrie Protected Landscape Area

== Photo gallery ==
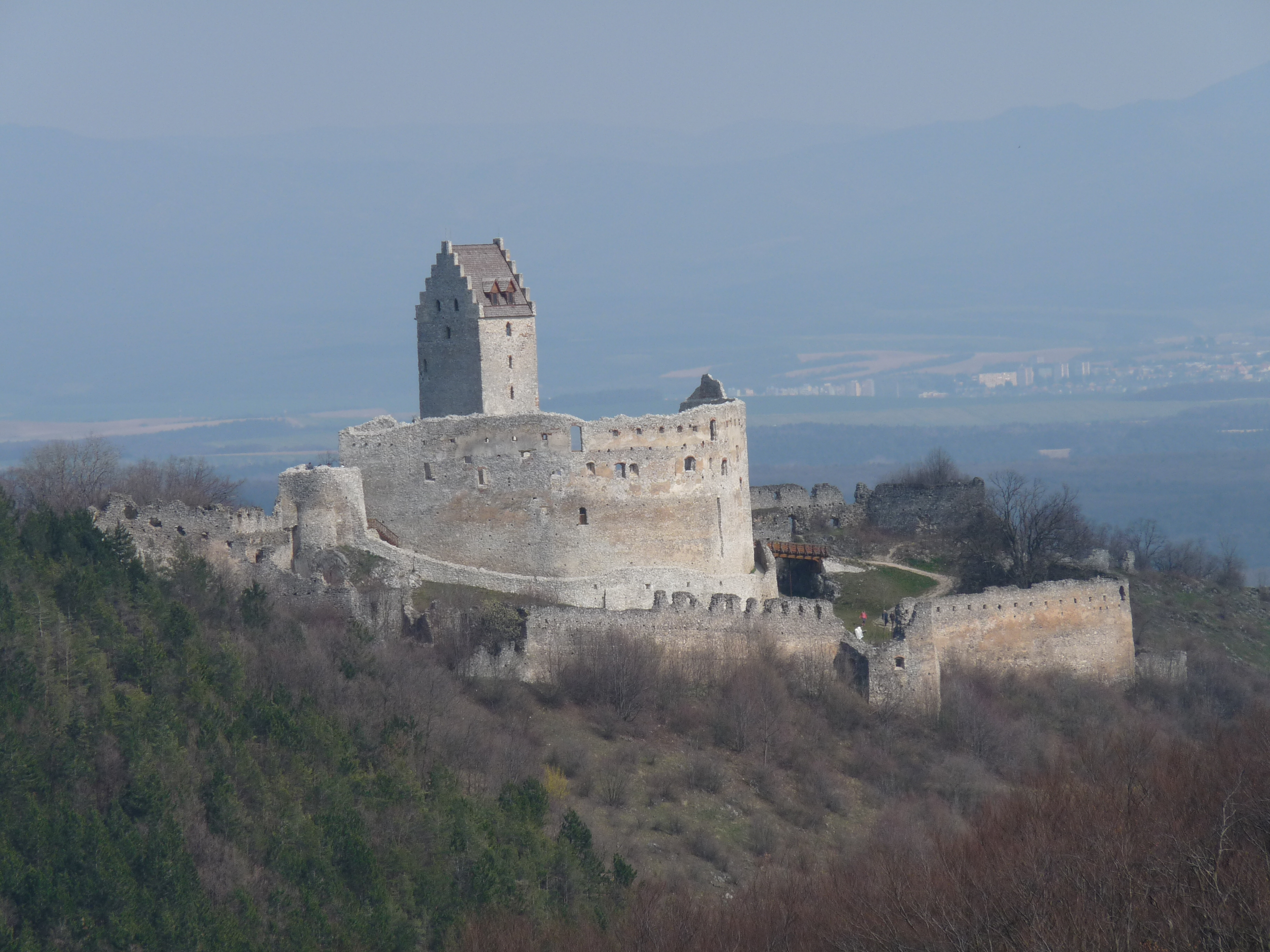
Topoľčany Castle

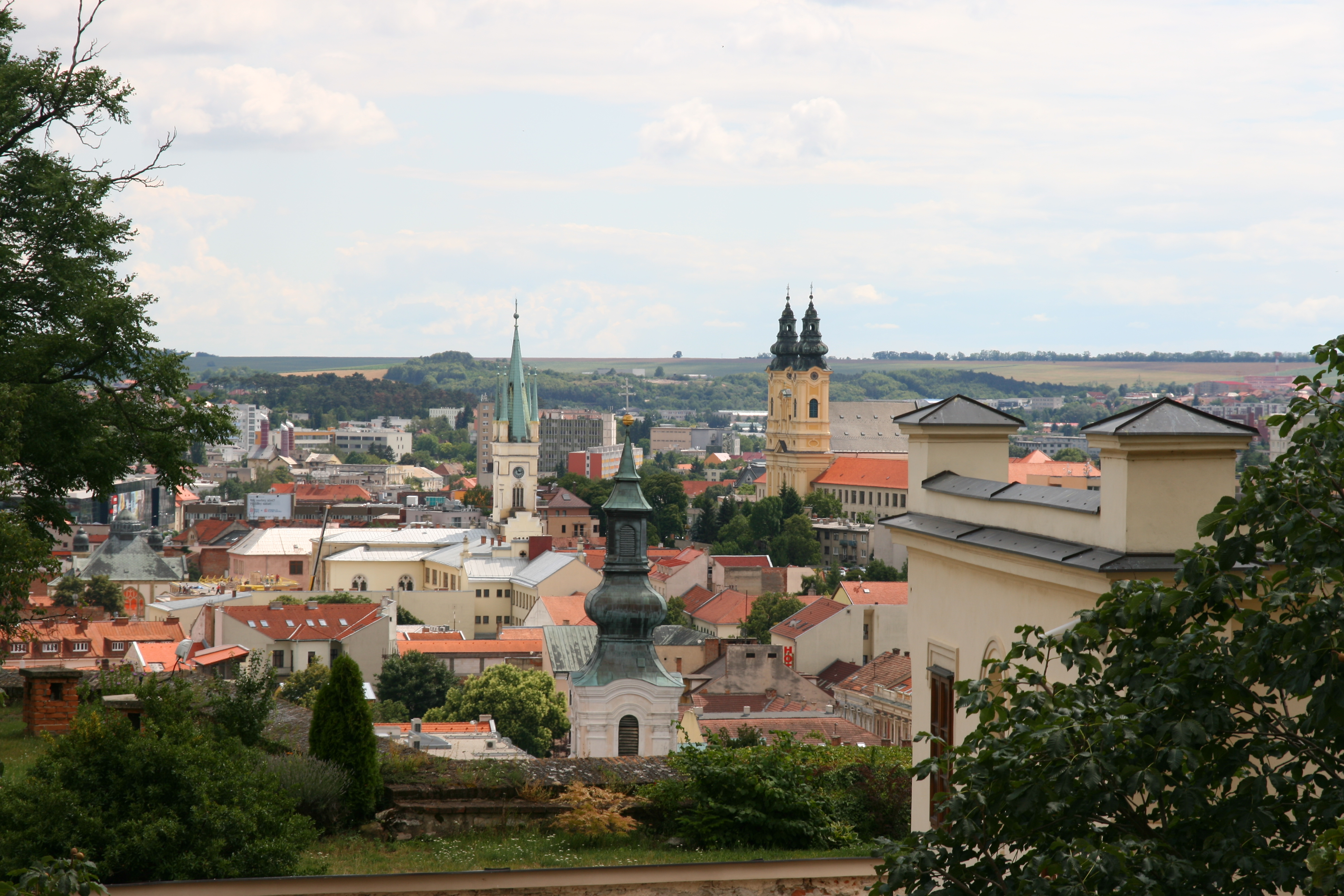
Nitra

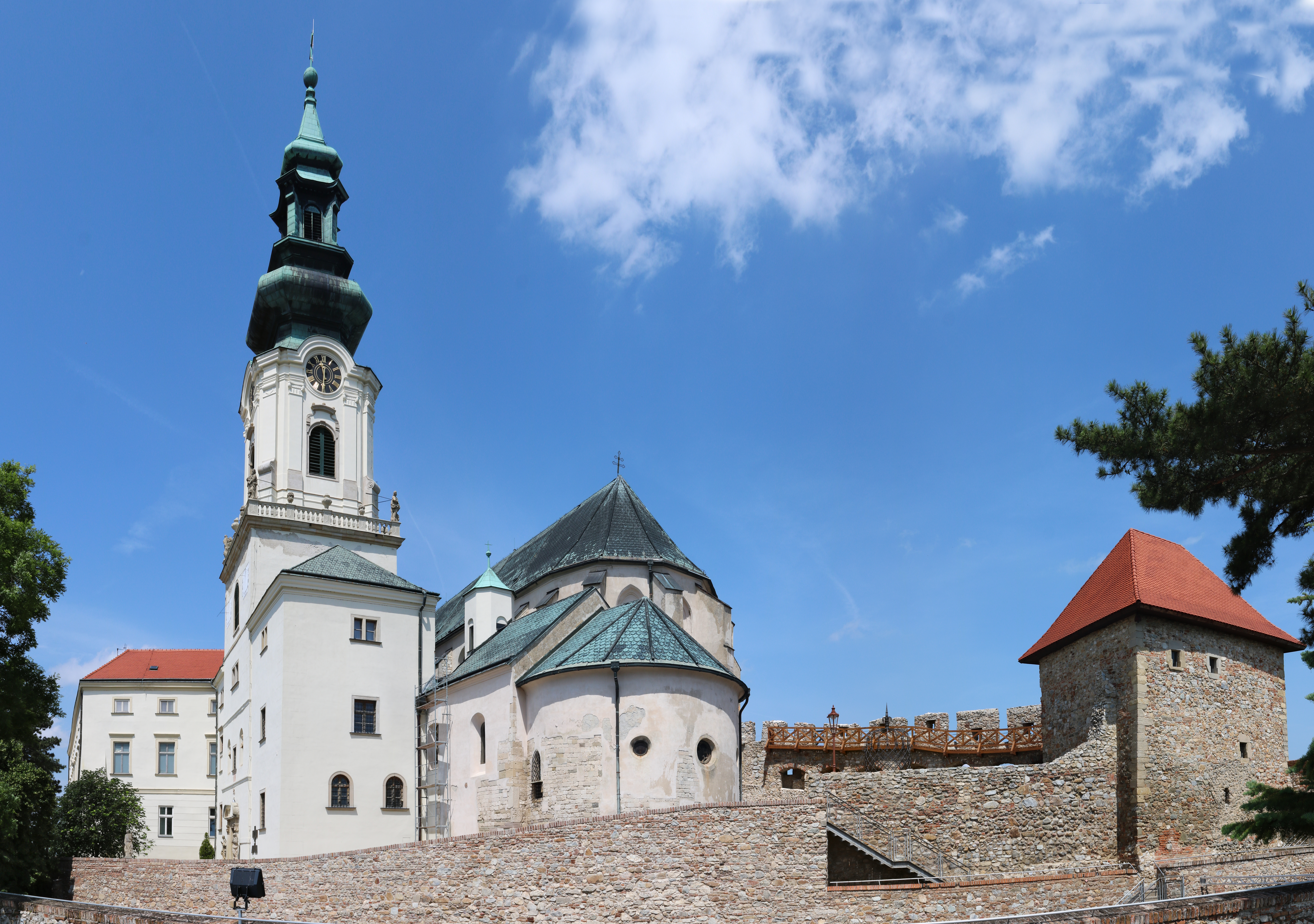
Saint Emmeram's Cathedral at Nitra Castle, Nitra

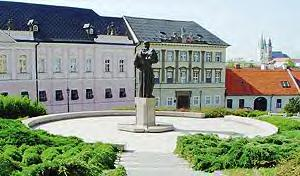
Pribinas Square with statue of Pribina, Nitra

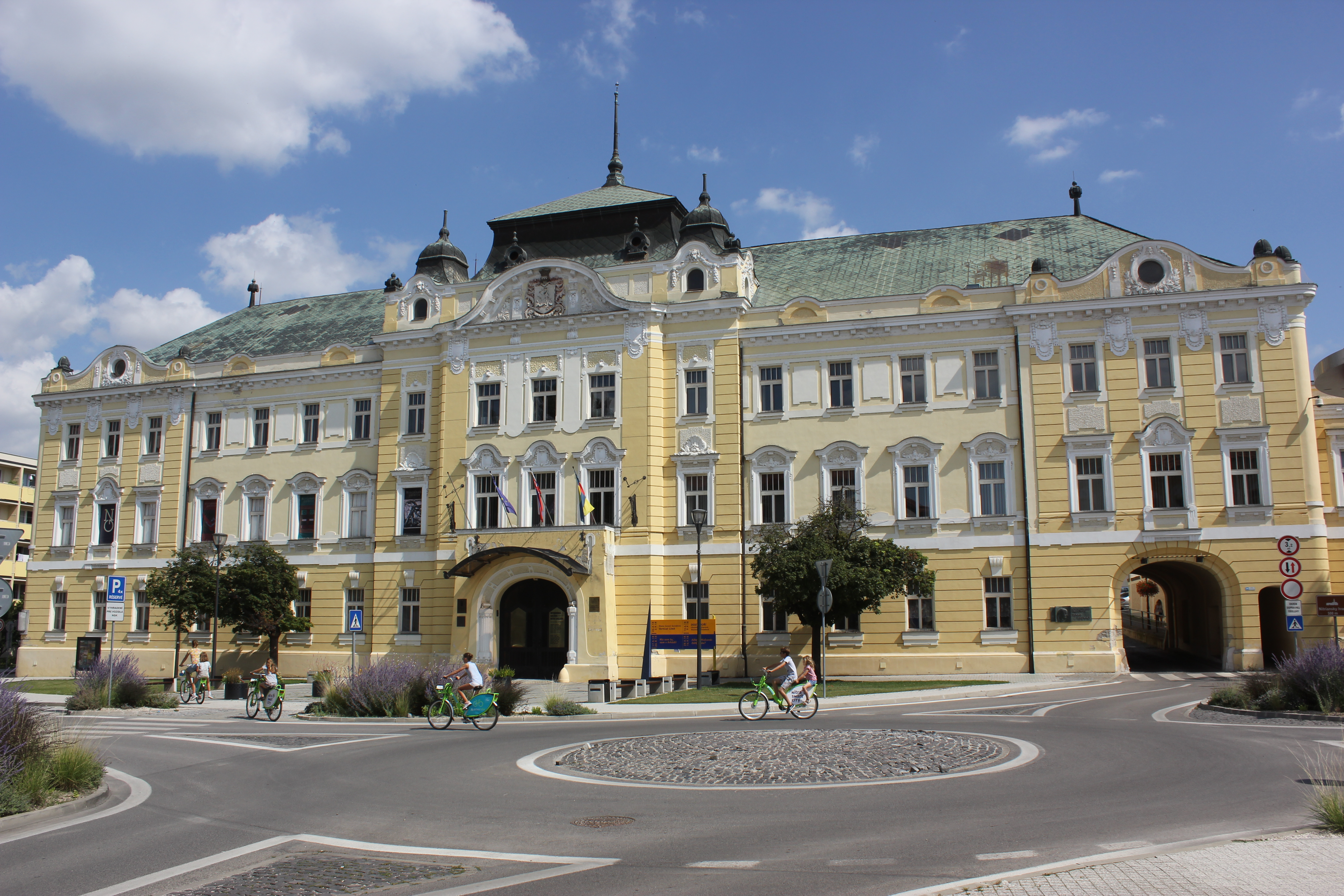
Nitra

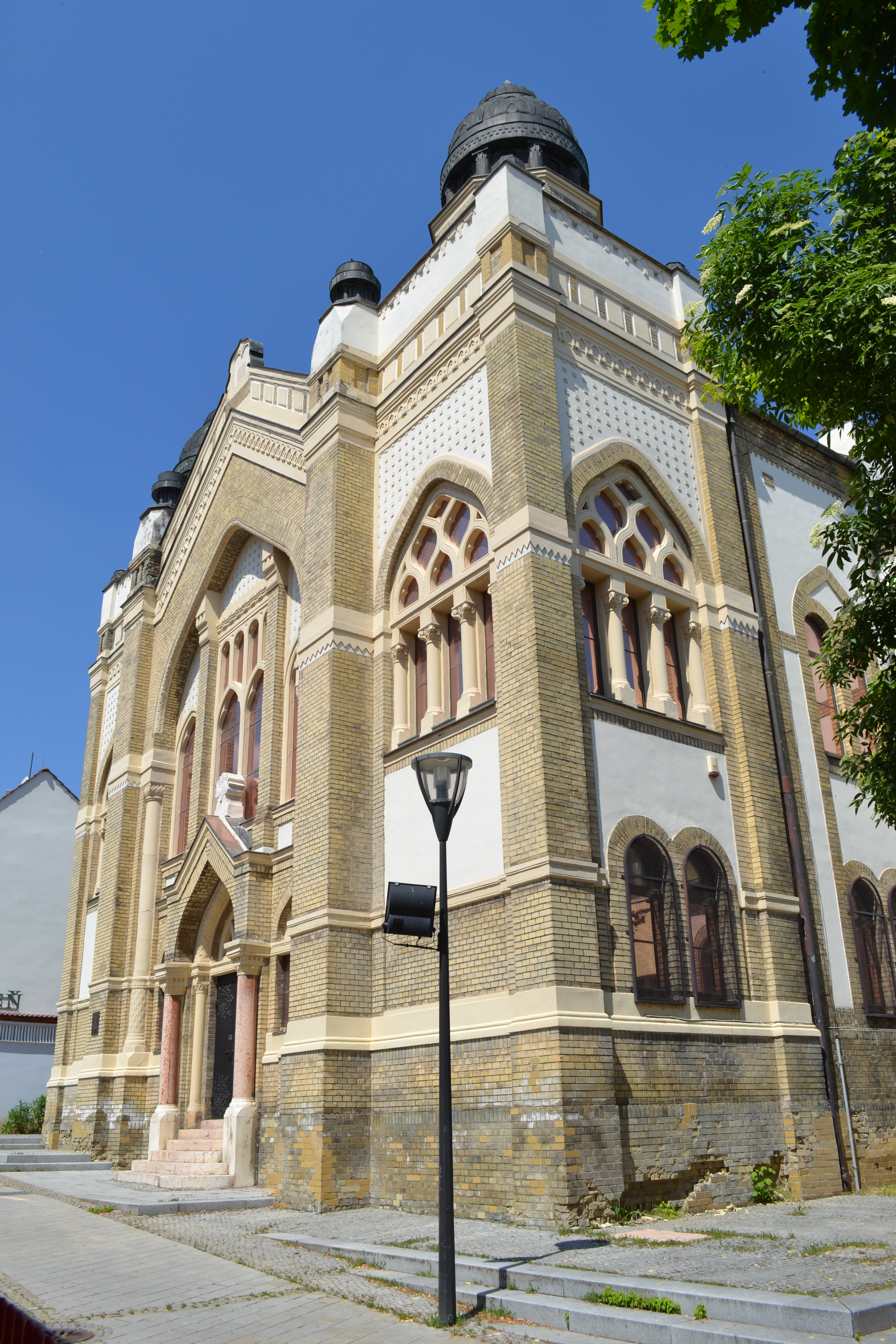
Nitra synagogue, Nitra

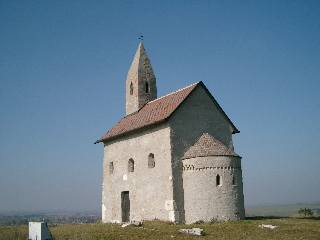
Dražovce church, Nitra

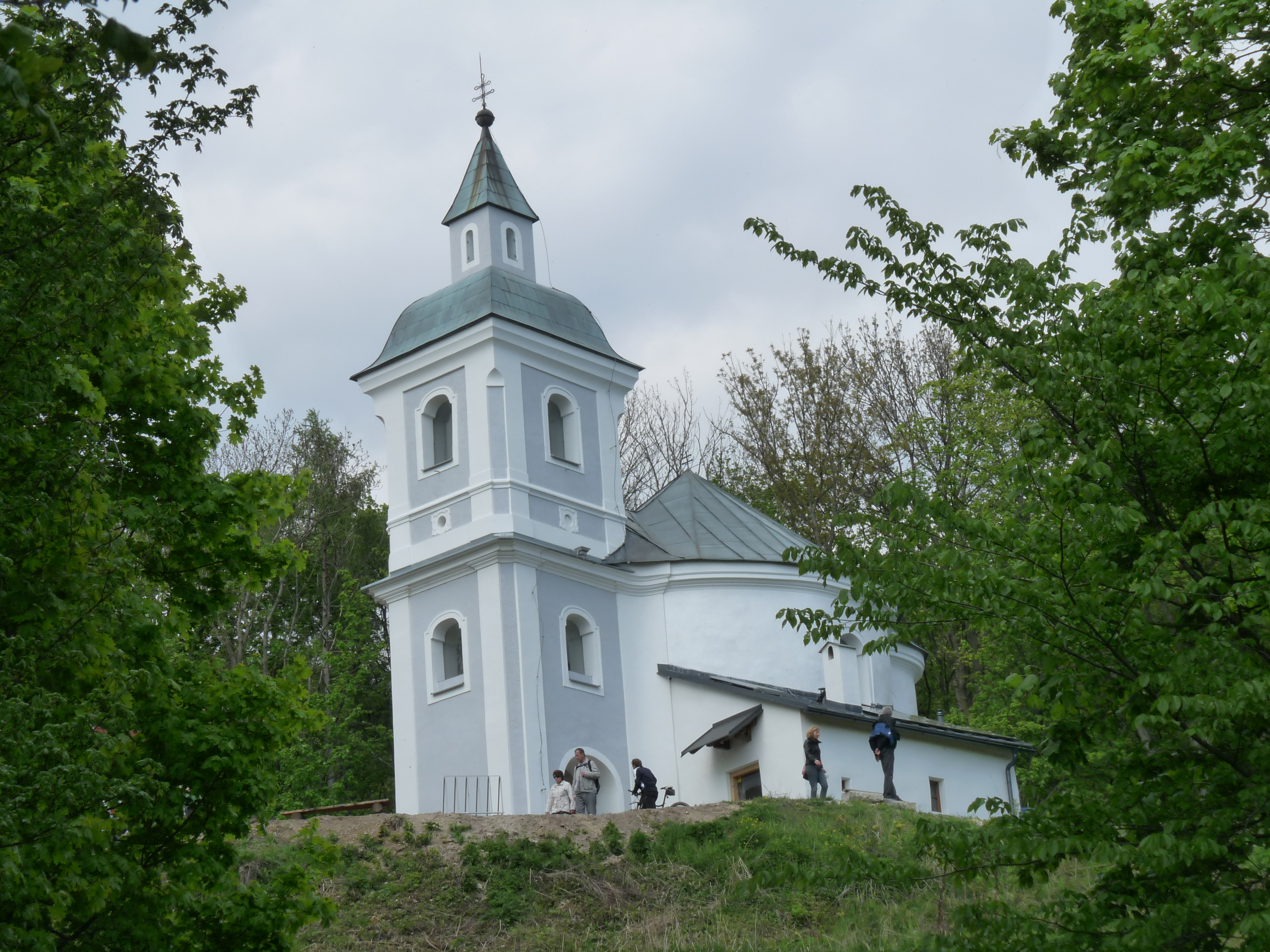
Nitrianska Blatnica church

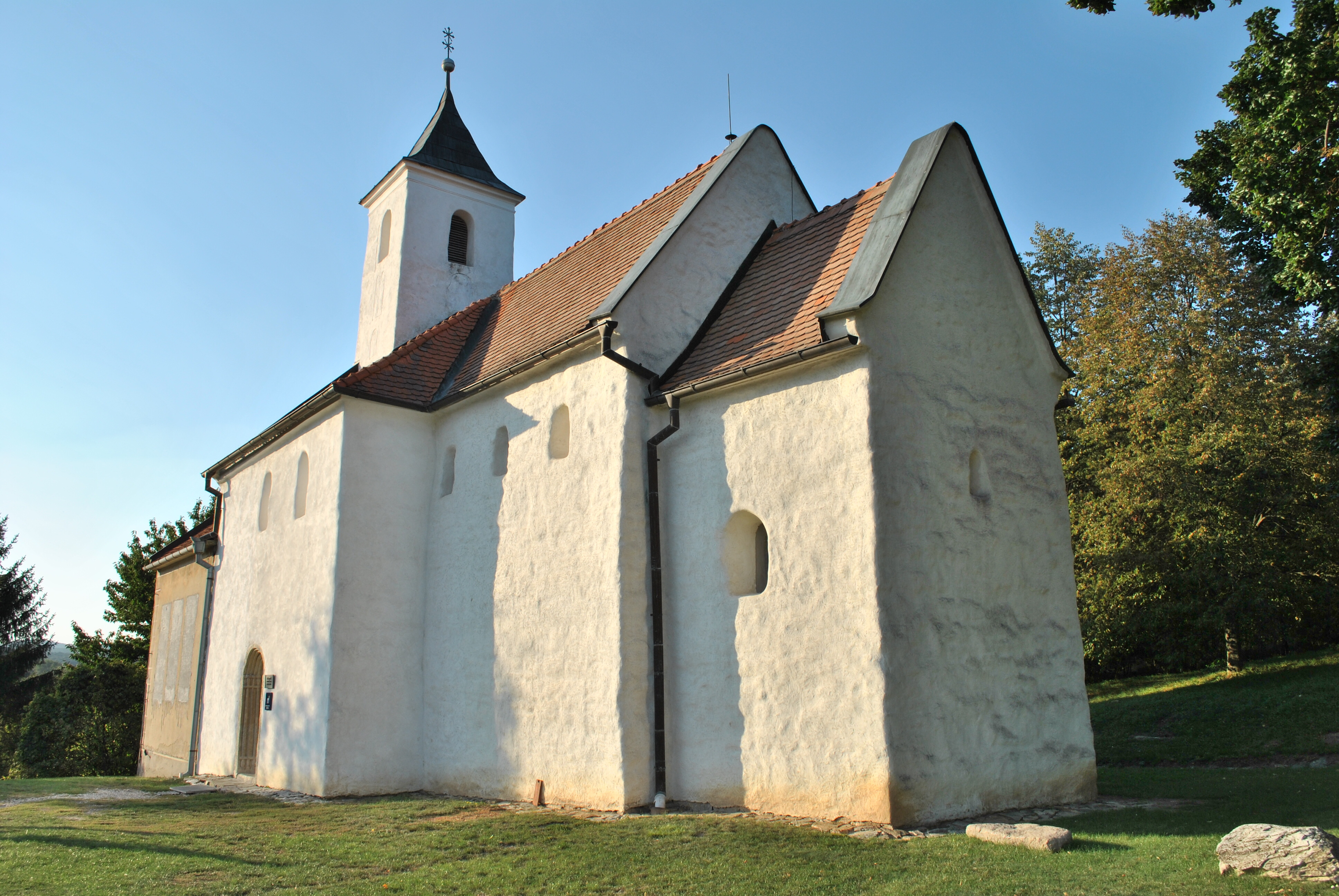
Kostoľany pod Tribečom church

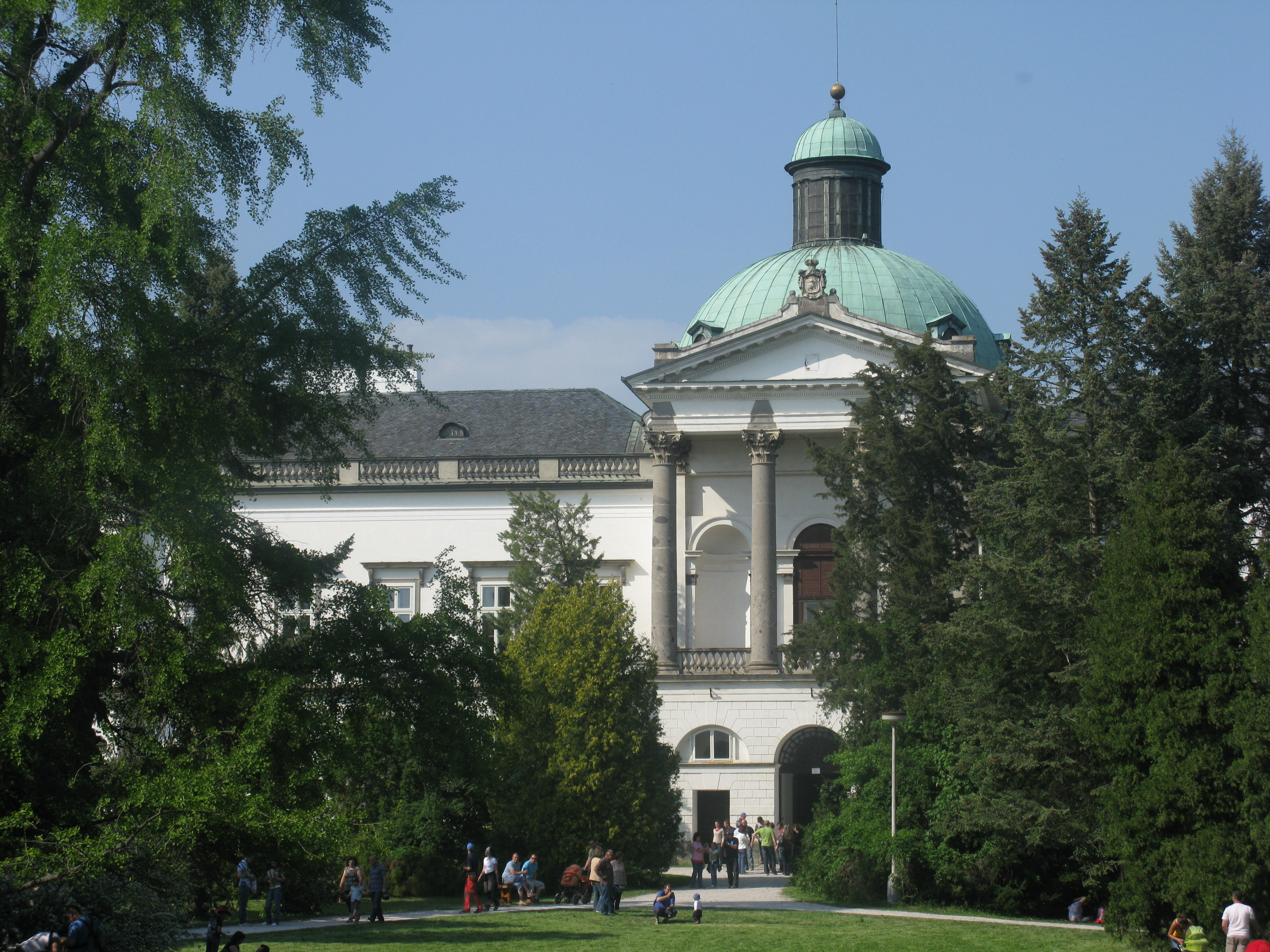
Topoľčianky chateau

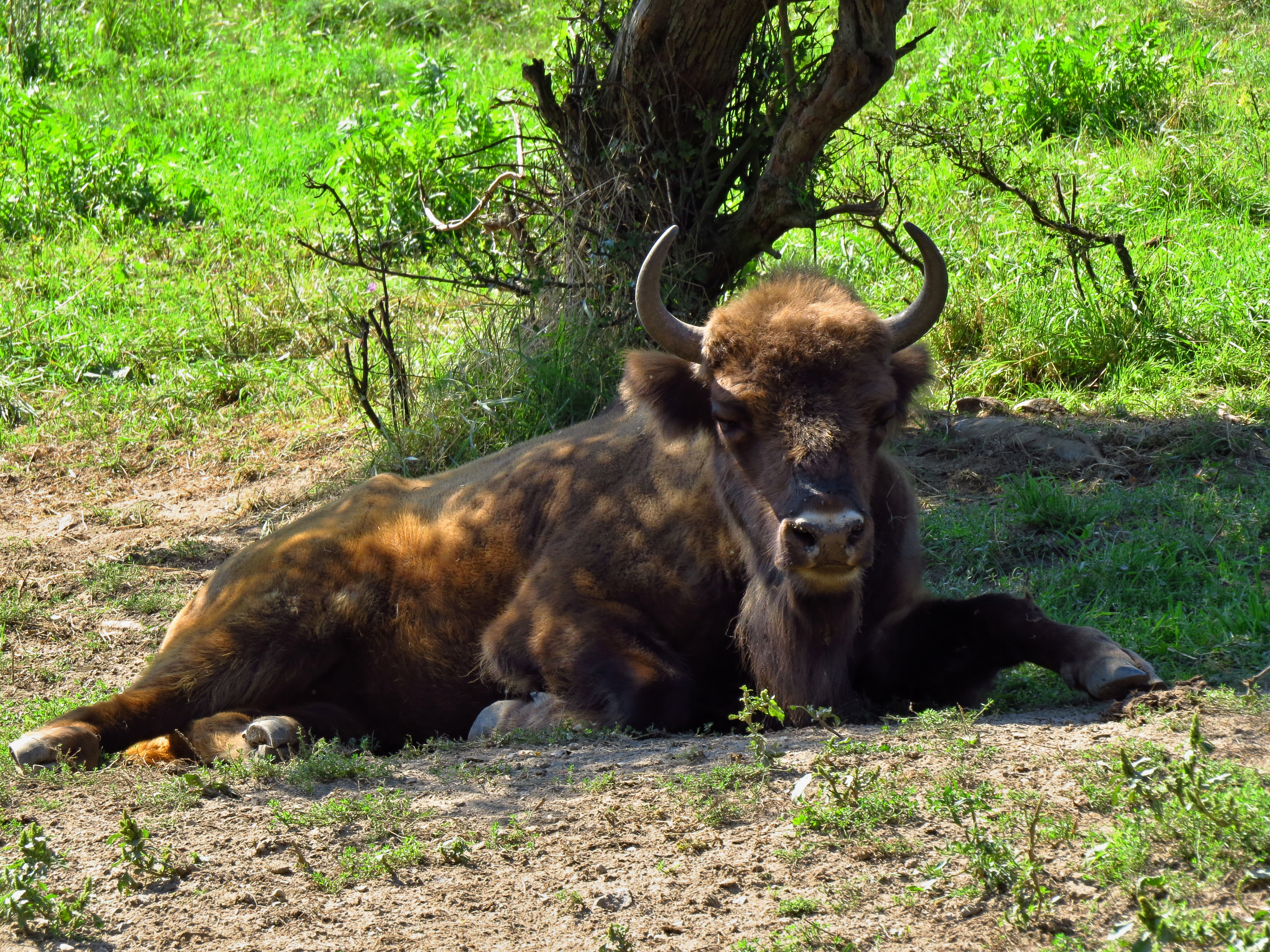
European bison in Topoľčianska zubria zvernica

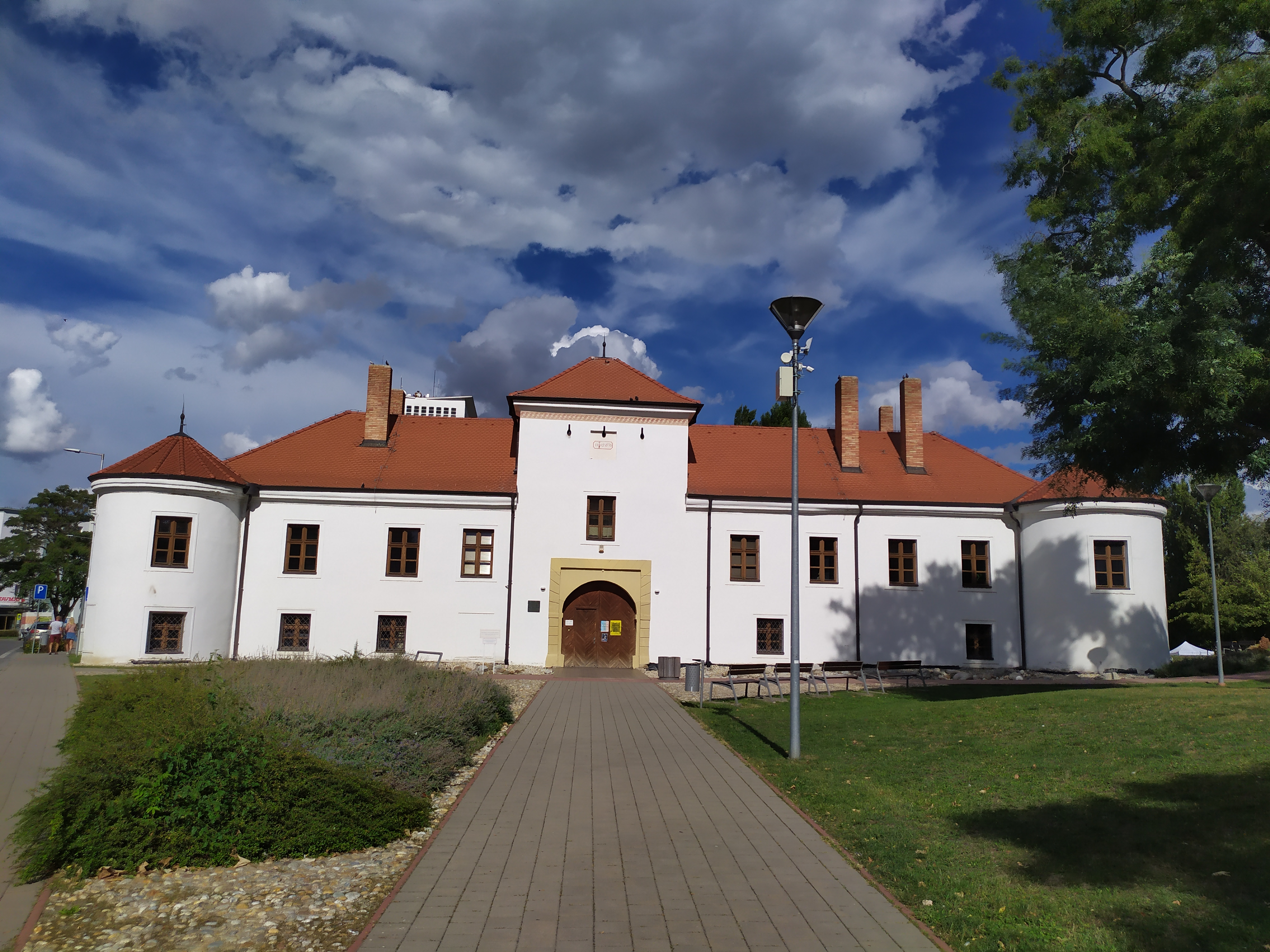
Šaľa castle

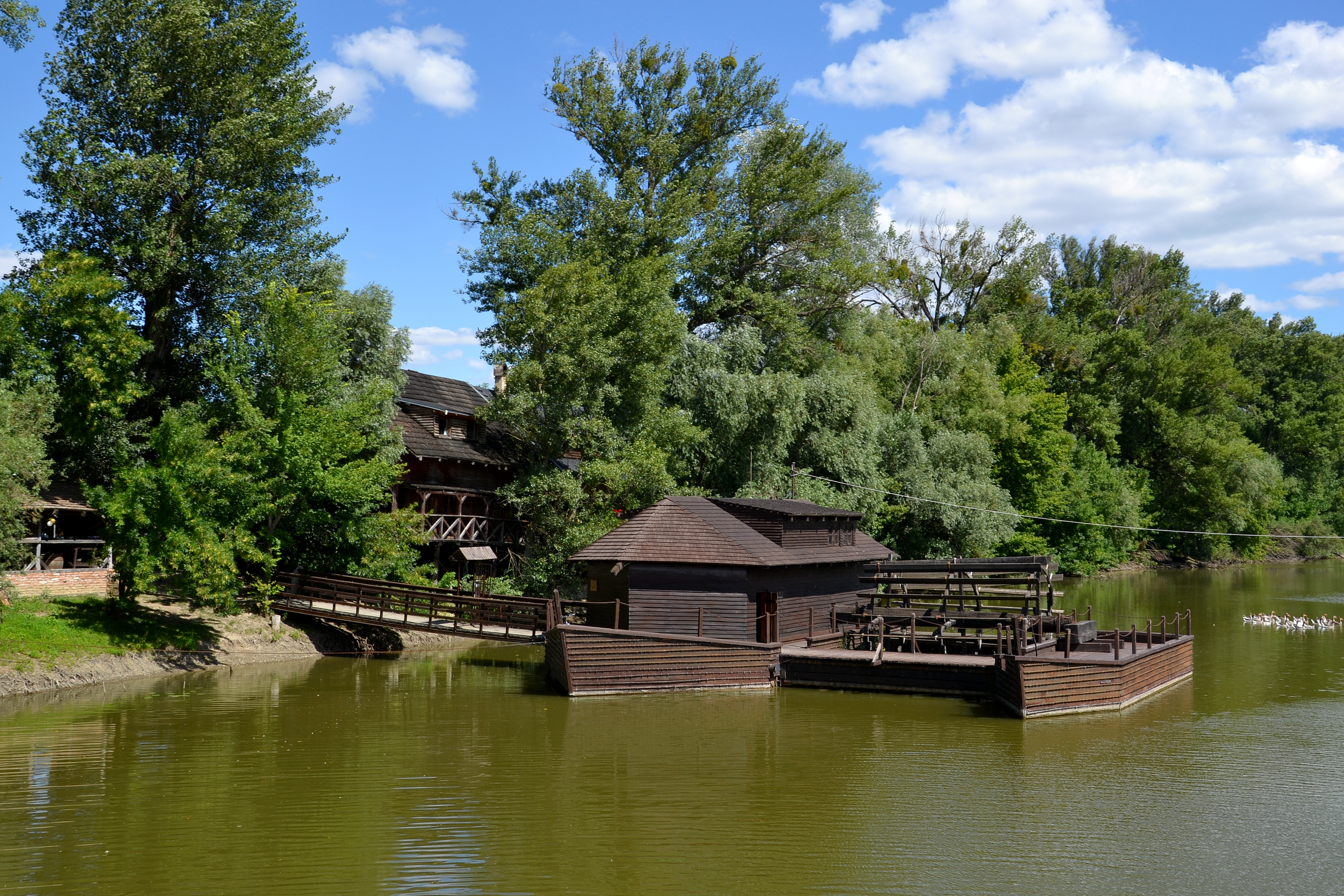
Water mill in Kolárovo

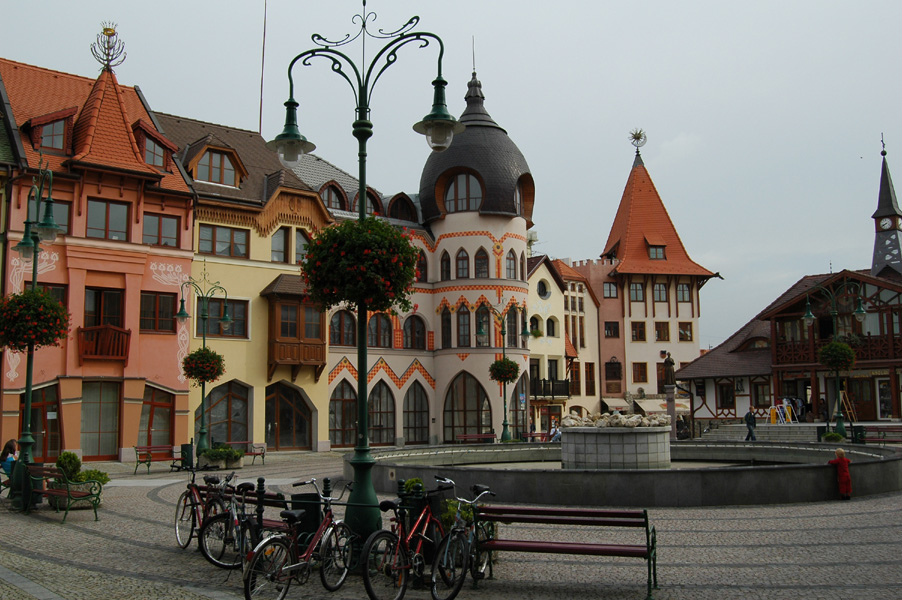
Komárno

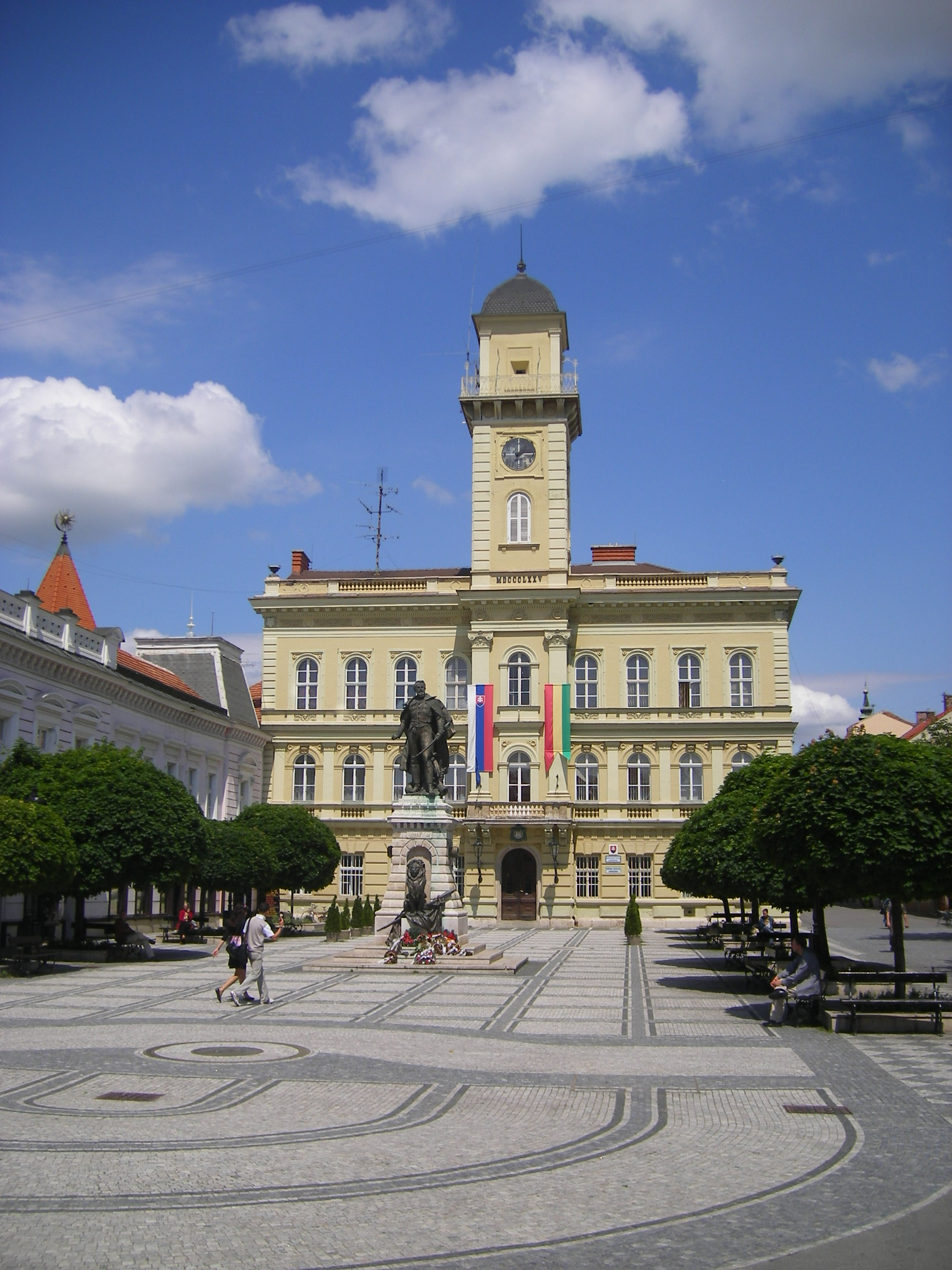
Komárno

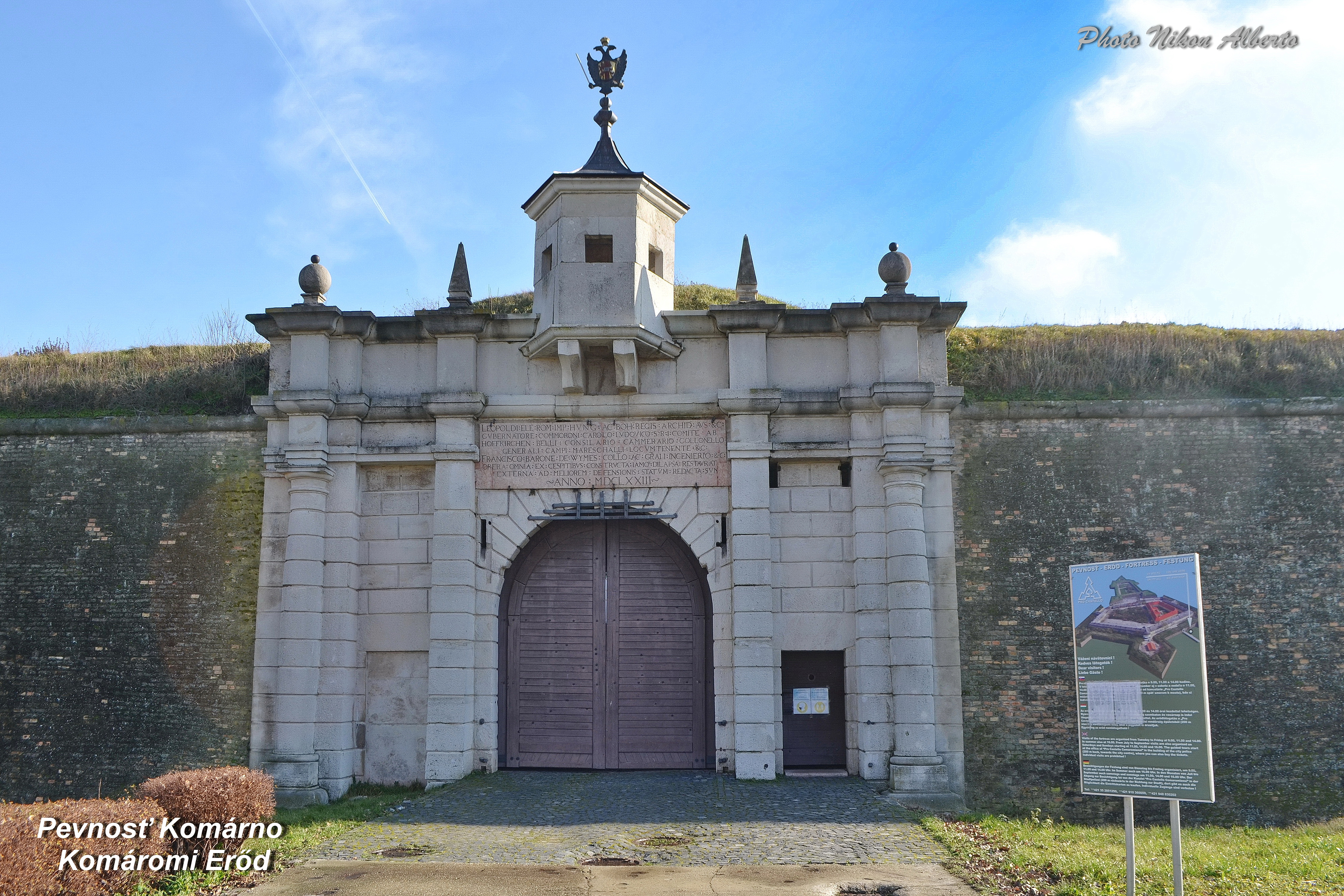
Komárno fortress, Komárno

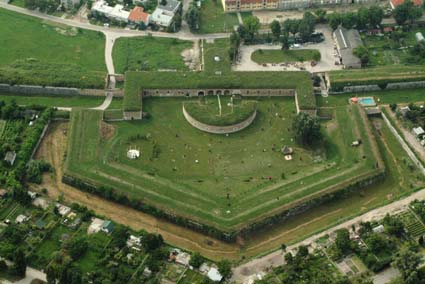
Komárno fortification system, Komárno

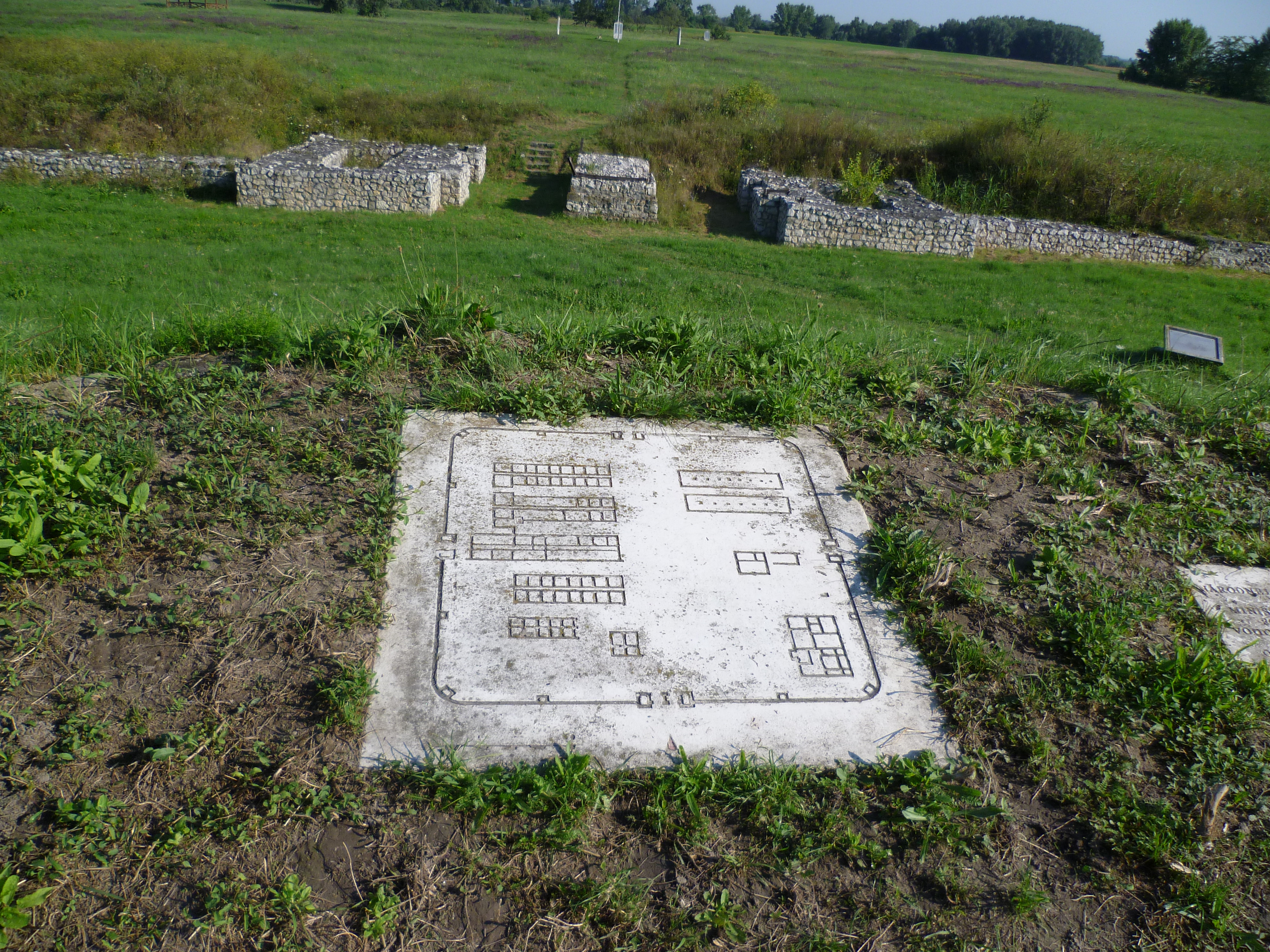
Roman military camp Celemantia, Iža (UNESCO World Heritage Site)

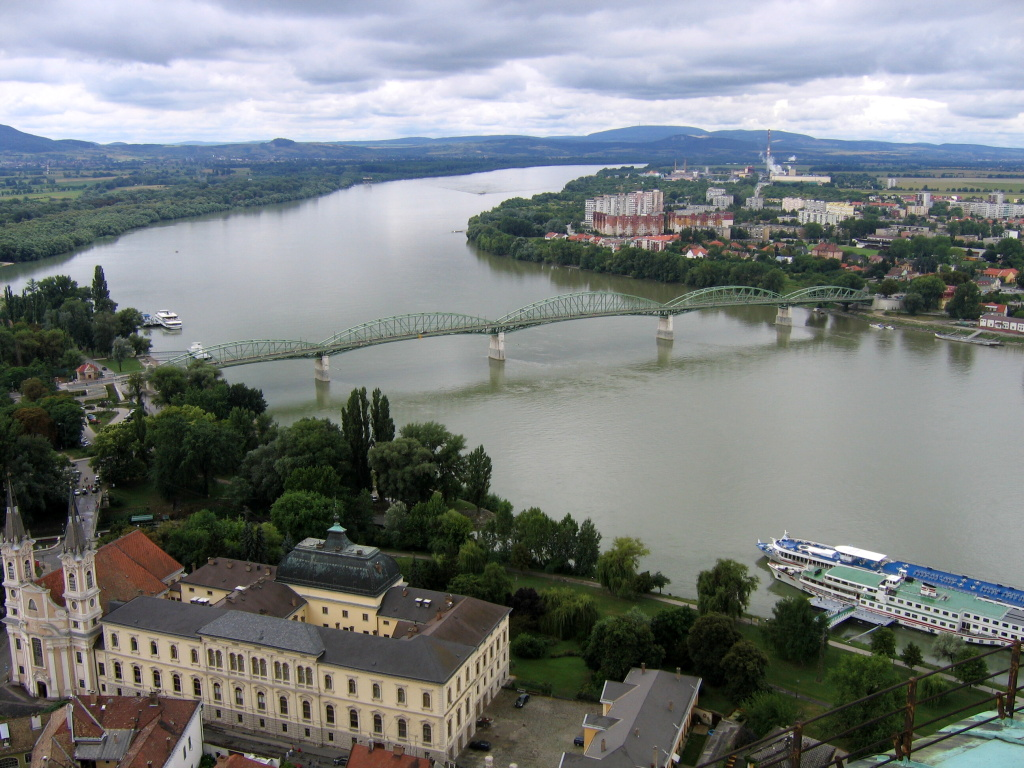
Bridge of Mária Valéria, Štúrovo

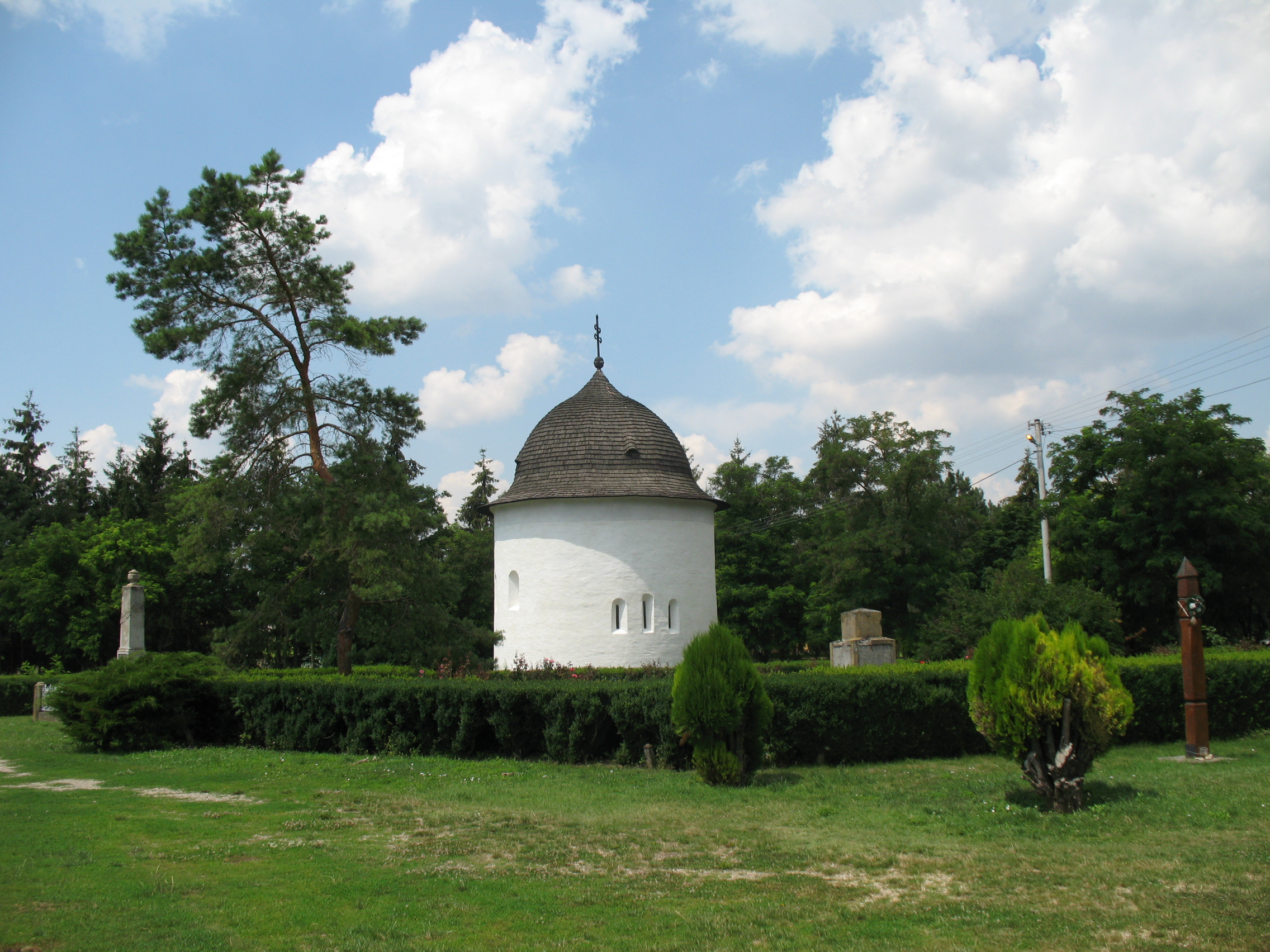
Rotunda in Bíňa

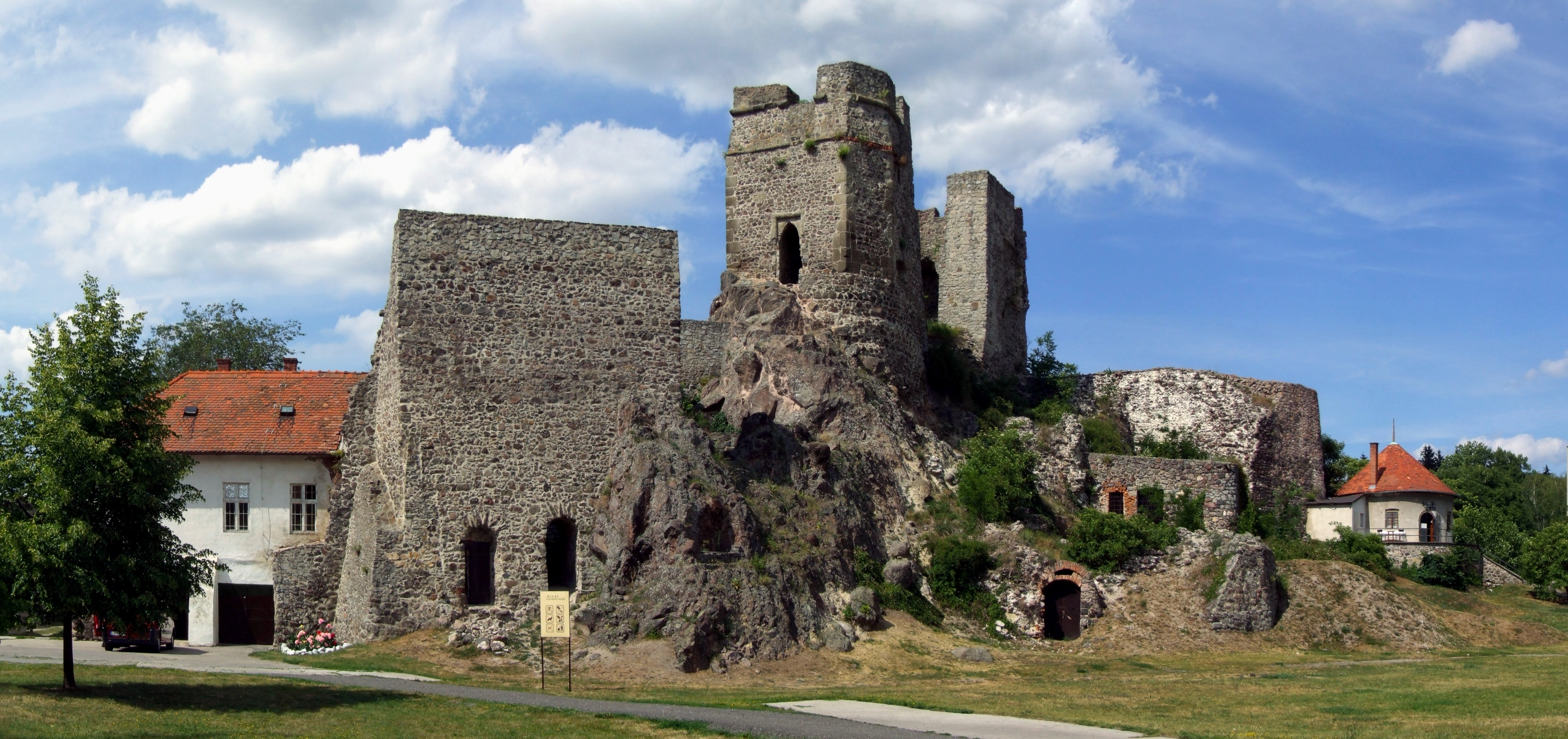
Levice Castle, Levice

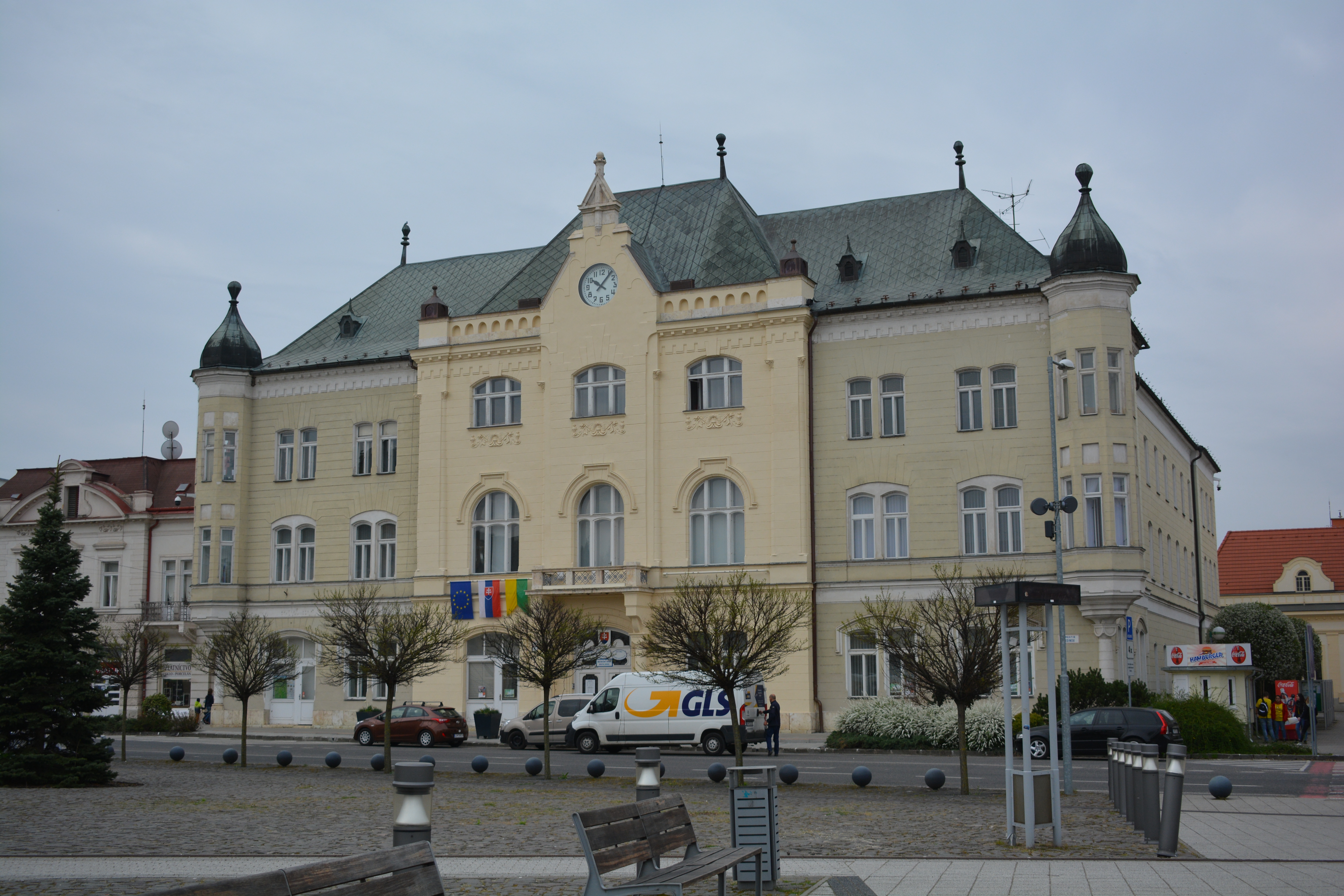
Levice Town Hall, Levice

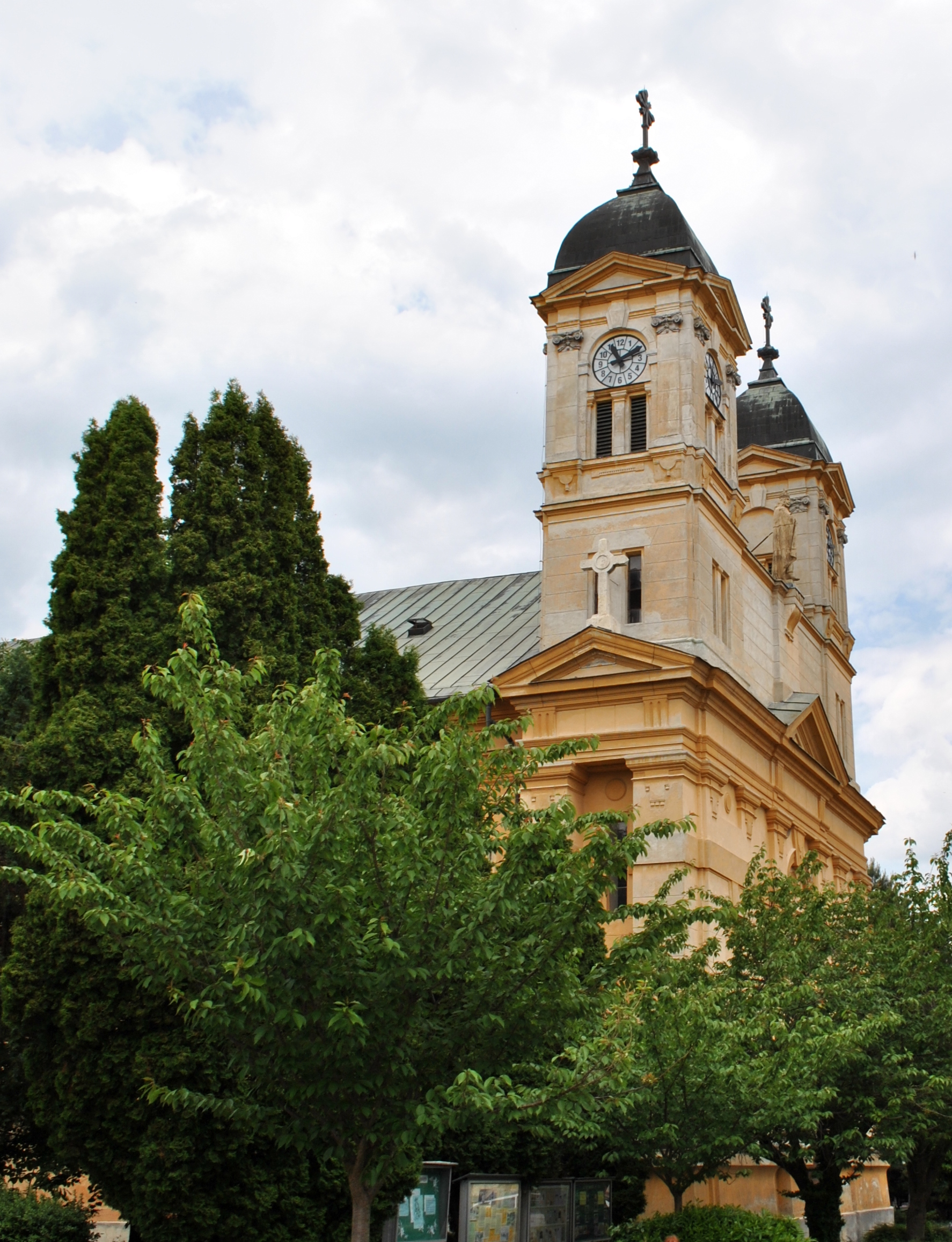
Church of Saint Michael, Levice

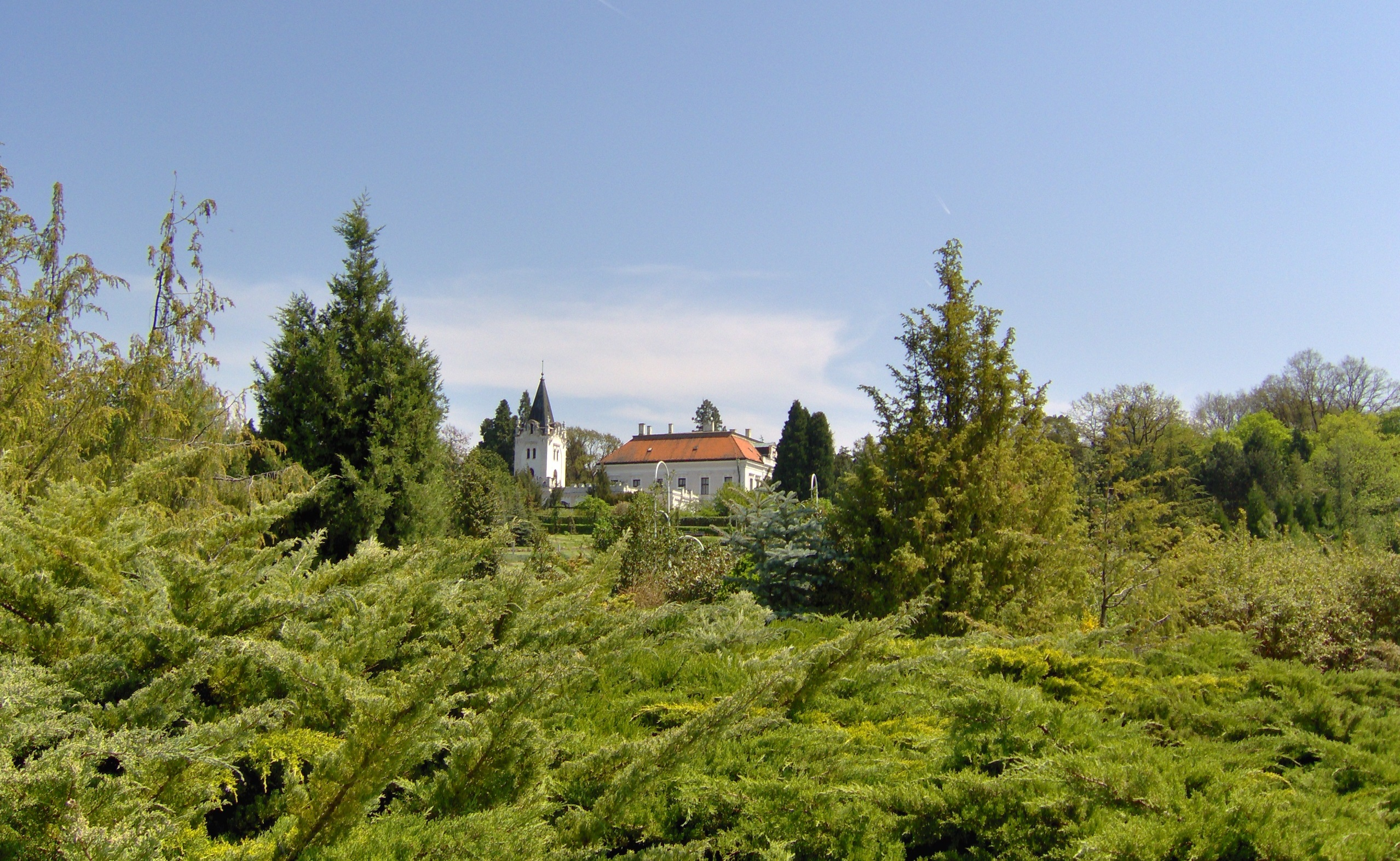
Arboretum Tesárske Mlyňany

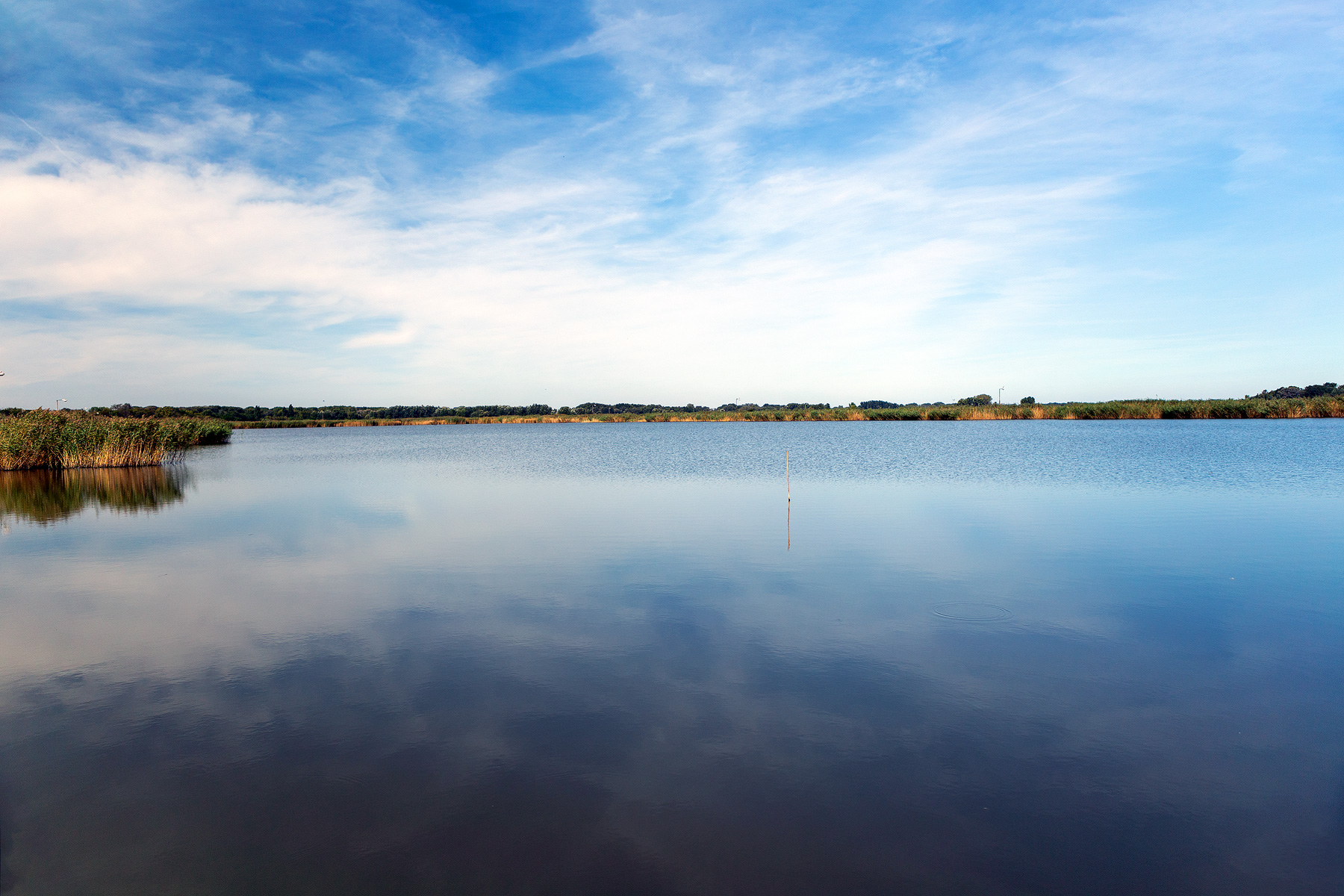
Dunajské luhy Protected Landscape Area

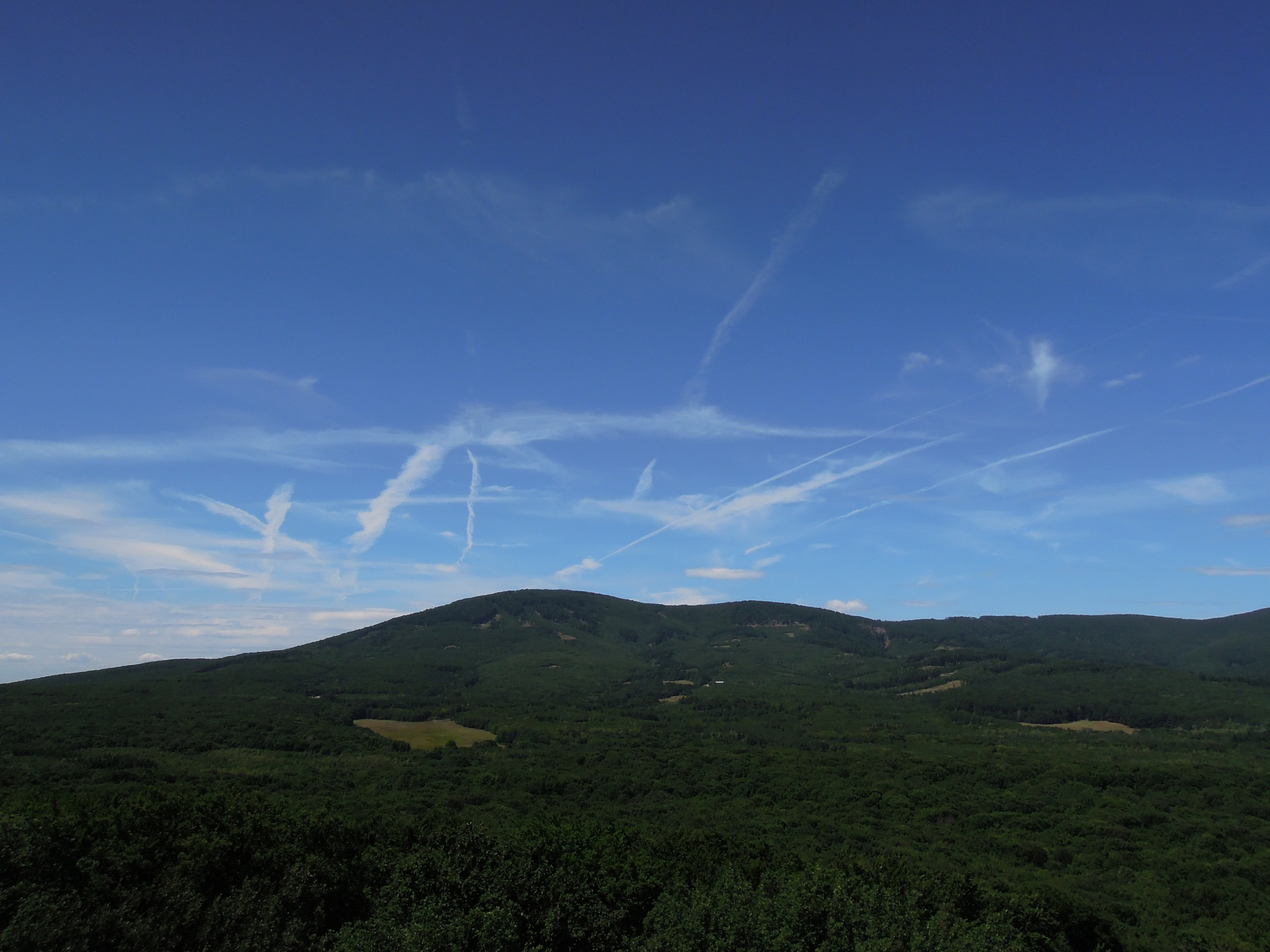
Ponitrie Protected Landscape Area

== See also ==
- Nyitra County of the Kingdom of Hungary
