= Nitrianska Blatnica =

Nitrianska Blatnica Nyitrasárfő
- Municipality
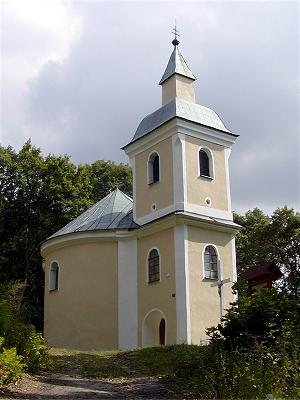

- Flag

- Location of Nitrianska Blatnica in the Nitra Region Location of Nitrianska Blatnica in Slovakia
- Coordinates: 48.55°N 17.97°E
- Country: Slovakia
- Region: Nitra Region
- District: Topoľčany District
- First mentioned: 1185

Area
  - Total: 14.38 km^{2} (5.55 sq mi)
- Elevation: 234 m (768 ft)

Population (2025)
  - Total: 1,224
- Time zone: UTC+1 (CET)
  - Summer (DST): UTC+2 (CEST)
- Postal code: 956 04
- Area code: +421 38
- Vehicle registration plate (until 2022): TO
- Website: nitrianskablatnica.sk

Nitrianska Blatnica (Hungarian: Nyitrasárfő) is a municipality with 1,192 inhabitants in the Topoľčany District of the Nitra Region, Slovakia. In the hills above the village is a church of Saint George /rotunda svätého Juraja/, from 9th and 10th century, one of the oldest remaining church buildings in Slovakia.

== Geography ==
The municipality lies at an altitude of 234 metres (768 ft) and covers an area of 14.38 km^{2} (5.55 sq mi) (2025).

== Population ==
Population statistic (10 years)
Year	1995	2005	2015	2025
Count	1155	1217	1237	1224
Difference		+5.36%	+1.64%	−1.05%

Population statistic
Year	2024	2025
Count	1235	1224
Difference		−0.89%

It has a population of 1224 people (31 December 2025).

=== Ethnicity ===
Census 2021 (1+ %)
Ethnicity	Number	Fraction
Slovak	1189	96.5%
Not found out	39	3.16%
Total	1232	

In year 2021 was 1232 people by ethnicity 1189 as Slovak, 39 as Not found out, 4 as Czech, 2 as German, 2 as Hungarian, 2 as Other, 1 as Romani and 1 as Albanian.

Note on population: The difference values of population numbers in the table "Population statistic" and in the sections "Ethnicity" & "Religion" is caused by the use of various statistical methods.

=== Religion ===
Census 2021 (1+ %)
Religion	Number	Fraction
Roman Catholic Church	970	78.73%
None	183	14.85%
Not found out	35	2.84%
Evangelical Church	20	1.62%
Total	1232	

In year 2021 was 1232 people by religion 970 from Roman Catholic Church, 183 from None, 35 from Not found out, 20 from Evangelical Church, 7 from Greek Catholic Church, 4 from Christian Congregations in Slovakia, 3 from Other, 3 from Buddhism, 2 from Calvinist Church, 2 from Other and not ascertained christian church, 2 from United Methodist Church and 1 from Ad hoc movements.

== The Church of Saint George ==
The church lies on the slope of the hill Mahrát in the locality "Jurko". The site is on the important route between Váh and Nitra river basins. According to the written sources, the church was built in 1530 by Anna Thurso in memory of her husband who died in Battle of Mohács. However, an archaeological research uncovered new findings and changed the dating to the early medieval period, with the highest probability the Great Moravian period or shortly after. The Church of Saint George belonged to the early medieval court (curtis), but was a part of a separate settlement near the main court. The rotunda in Nitrianska Blatnica is similar to the Great Moravian rotunda in Ducové (7 km (4.3 mi) from Blatnica). The building was rebuilt and reconstructed several times, the current baroque look is from 1777.

== Sources ==
- Botek, Andrej (2014). Veľkomoravské kostoly na Slovensku [The Great Moravian Churches in Slovakia] (in Slovak). Bratislava: Post Scriptum. ISBN 978-80-89567-37-9.
- Ruttkay, Alexander (2007). "Významné archeologické lokality z včasného stredoveku v oblasti Považského Inovca" [Important Archaeological Sites from the Early Middle Ages in the Region of Považský Inovec]. In Pieta, Karol; Ruttkay, Alexander; Ruttkay, Matej (eds.). Bojná, hospodárske a politické centrum Nitrianskeho kniežactva (in Slovak and German). Nitra: Archeologický ústav SAV. ISBN 978-80-88709-91-6.
