= Dražovce church =

Roman Catholic church in Dražovce, Nitra district, Slovakia

Coordinates: 48.3568°N 18.05553°E

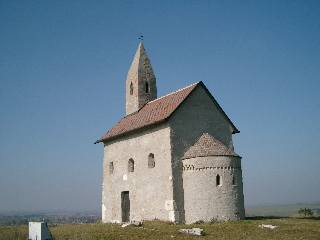
Dražovce church

Dražovský kostolík (officially the Church of St. Michael the Archangel, Hungarian: Szent Mihály-templom) is one of the oldest churches in Slovakia, dating from the 11th century, located at Dražovce (now part of Nitra). It is a typical early Romanesque architecture single-nave building with thick enclosure walls and small roundish apse. It is no longer used. Research from 1947 and 1948 discovered 55 graves around the church.

Dražovce church is depicted on the Slovak postage stamp of the highest face-value and was also formerly depicted on the Slovak 50 SKK note before the changeover to € currency.
