= Fortress of Komárno =

- Komárno, Slovakia
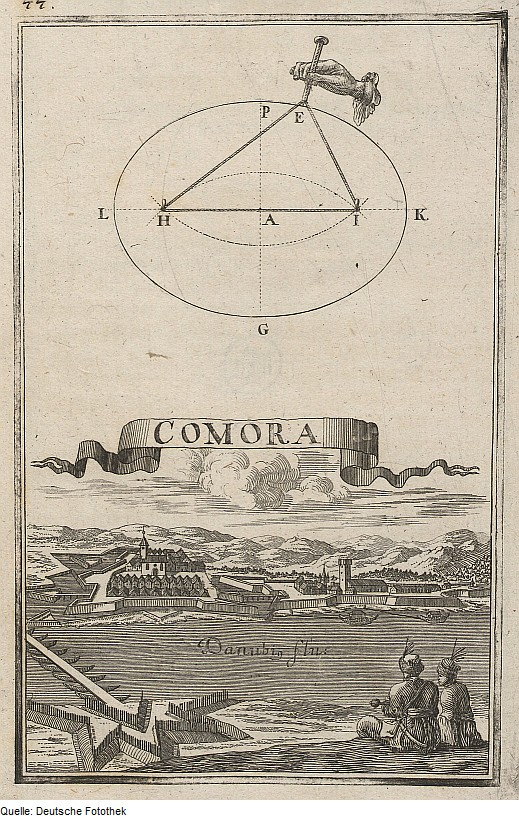
- The fort on the engraving by A. E. Burkhard from 1698.

Location
- Coordinates: 47°46′N 18°08′E

Fortress of Komárno, located in Slovakia, is the central part of the Komárno fortification system at the confluence of the Danube and Váh rivers.

== History ==
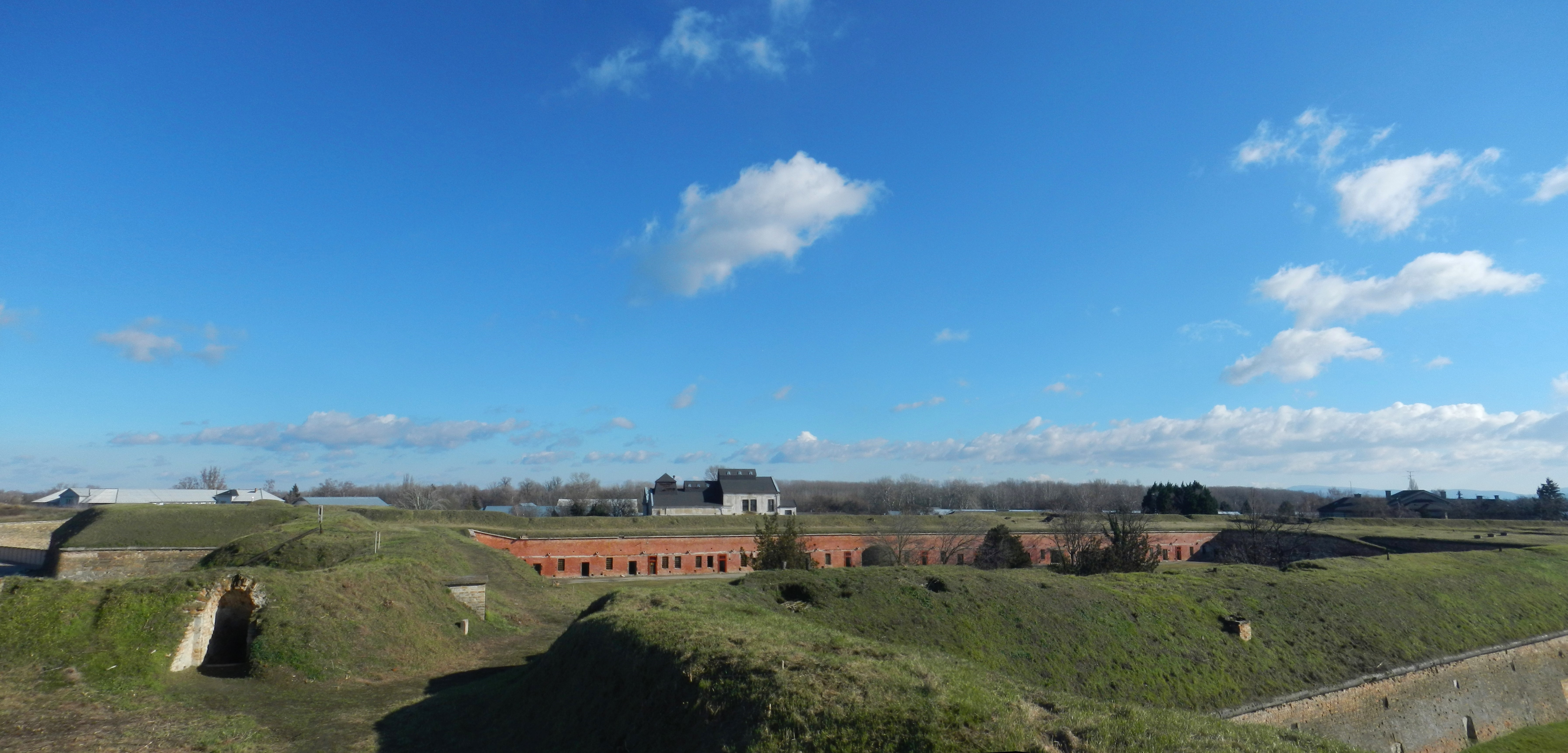
Old Fortress, the oldest part of Fortress of Komárno

The fortress is located in today's urban area of Komárno on the left bank of the Danube, which has belonged to Czecho-Slovakia (today's Slovakia) since 1920. It had great strategic importance in the past and was the largest fortress in what was then the Austro-Hungarian Empire.

During the period of Turkish expansion in the 16th century, the city of Komárno fell within the border area between the Habsburg and Ottoman empires. The construction of the so-called "old" fortress began in 1546 on the foundations of a medieval castle according to plans by the Italian master builder Pietro Ferrabosco and the Alsatian Daniel Specklin. The fortress was built at the confluence of the Danube and Váh rivers to protect further Turkish advances into Habsburg-ruled Hungary. In 1526, the Ottoman Empire invaded Hungary. In the Battle of Mohács on 29 August 1526, the Hungarian army was crushed by the Turks. The fortress proved itself when in 1594 the Ottomans tried unsuccessfully to take the city of Komárno with an army of 100,000 men. Between the years 1673 and 1683 the fortress was strengthened. The Old Fortress had five bastions and two inner courtyards surrounded by casemate-like structures designed to house the guards. The fortress was surrounded by a moat. And there was only one access to the fortress through the so-called Ferdinand Gate.

After the Turks conquered nearby Nové Zámky in 1663, it was decided to build a "new" fortress in Komárno. The master builder Franz Wymes was commissioned with the construction work, and the work was completed in 1673. The New Fortress had five bastions and was connected to the Old Fortress via the two eastern bastions. The main access was via the well-guarded Leopold Gate. The New Fortress was also surrounded by a wide moat. The top of the western bastion of the New Fortress bears the inscription NEC ARTE, NEC MARTE (Eng. "Neither by cunning nor by force"). These words fully characterise the fortification complex, which was so perfect and impregnable for that time. And indeed, the fortress of Komárno could never be taken by the Ottomans.

In later times, the two fortresses were given the name "Citadel".

In 1682 the fortress was severely damaged by floods. Emperor Leopold I ordered the restoration and the necessary repair work. In 1683 the fortress of Komárno was besieged by Emmerich Thököly's army but could not be taken by him. After the defeat of the Ottoman army near Vienna in 1683, the fortress lost its strategic importance as a border bastion.

An earthquake in 1783, the epicentre of which was not far from the fortress, caused extensive damage to the fortress and sealed its fate. The generals of that time decided to give up the fortress because repairs were no longer worthwhile. The site of the fortress was donated to the city by Emperor Joseph II, and the buildings were sold at auction in 1784 to the highest bidder.

During the Napoleonic Wars, the fortress gained new strategic importance and became interesting again for military purposes. In 1808 the fortress was again prepared for the military. In 1810, new barracks were built in one of the courtyards.

The Komárno Fortress played an important role in the revolution and the subsequent Hungarian War of Independence in 1848/1849. The Komárno Fortress, held by the Hungarian revolutionary troops under General Klapka, has been besieged several times. After the Third Battle of Komárno, Klapka's army was encircled. The last siege of Komárno began on 13 July 1849, and after several months, the Hungarian garrison was forced to surrender. The fortress was handed over to the victorious Austrians on 2 October 1849.

By the end of the 19th century, the largest fortification system of the Austro-Hungarian monarchy had been developed in Komárno and was field-fortified in 1914/1915 according to the general draft of equipment laid down in peace. However, the fortress was not involved in any combat operations in the following years. At the beginning of January 1918, the k.u.k. Comorn Fortress. At the end of the First World War, it no longer had any strategic importance.

After the collapse of the Danube monarchy, the fortress on the left bank of the Danube came under the Treaty of Trianon to the newly founded Czecho-Slovak Republic. Barracks for the Czecho-Slovak Army were set up in the Komárno Fortress. After the occupation of Czechoslovakia by Warsaw Pact troops in 1968, Red Army soldiers were billeted in the fortress. After the "Velvet Revolution" and the withdrawal of the Soviets, the fortress was used by the Army of the Slovak Republic between 1993 and 2003.

In 2003, the city of Komárno bought the Old and New Fortresses in order to carry out appropriate reconstruction work and thus preserve the historical ambience and make the object accessible to the public.

== See also ==
- Battle of Komarno
