= Lake Czorsztyn =

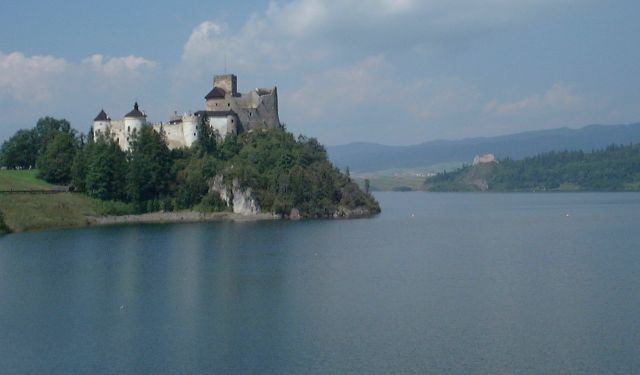
- Niedzica Castle and Lake Czorsztyn

- Location within Poland Location within Lesser Poland Voivodeship
- Location: Pieniny, Gorce Mountains
- Coordinates: 49°26′24″N 20°15′45″E
- Type: Artificial lake
- Primary inflows: Dunajec River
- Primary outflows: Dunajec River
- Basin countries: Poland
- Surface area: 11 km^{2} (4.2 sq mi)
- Max. depth: 50 m (160 ft)
- Shore length^{1}: 29.7 km (18.5 mi)
- Settlements: Czorsztyn, Niedzica, Kluszkowce
- ^{1} Shore length is not a well-defined measure.

Lake Czorsztyn (Polish: Jezioro Czorsztyńskie) is a man-made reservoir on the Dunajec river, southern Poland, between the Pieniny and the Gorce Mountains. It exists due to a dam in the village of Niedzica.

The dam itself was completed in 1995. Its measurements are: 56 metres (184 ft) high, 400 metres (1,300 ft) long and 7 metres (23 ft) wide on top. The lake has the area ranging from 4.15 square kilometres (1.60 sq mi) to 13.35 square kilometres (5.15 sq mi). Usually, its area is approximately 11 square kilometres (4.2 sq mi), with the length of 9 kilometres (5.6 mi) and width of 1.5 kilometres (0.93 mi). Maximum depth is 50 metres (160 ft), and average depth is 17.6 metres (58 ft). Total length of the shoreline is 29.7 kilometres (18.5 mi). Below the dam there is a much smaller Sromowce Lake, which regulates the water level of Czorsztyn Lake.

Main purpose of the reservoir is to prevent floods in the Dunajec river valley. Furthermore, it attracts a growing number of tourists. The dam is equipped with a 92 megawatt power plant. The lake is located in close proximity of several popular tourist spots, such as Pieniny National Park, Niedzica Castle, Czorsztyn Castle, and the tourist village of Kluszkowce. Among villages located by Czorsztyn Lake are Niedzica, Falsztyn, Frydman, Dębno Podhalańskie, Maniowy, Kluszkowce and Czorsztyn.

== Sources ==
- Andrzej Jagus: Szczawnica i okolice. Szczawnica: Karpatus, 2002. ISBN 83-917019-0-5. (pol.)
