= Dunajec river castles =

Series of castles built in Poland during the Middle Ages

The Dunajec river castles is a chain of thirteen medieval castles (some of which do not exist any longer), built in southern Lesser Poland, along the Dunajec river. The castles protected the border between the Kingdom of Poland and the Kingdom of Hungary, as well as a very important international trade route, which went along the Dunajec and the Poprad all the way down to the Danube river. Most of the castles are in ruins now, and some have disappeared. Their history dates back to the period known as the Fragmentation of Poland in the early 12th century, when, according to his will, known as the Testament of Bolesław III Wrymouth, the country was divided into several provinces. The Dunajec river castles were located on the territory of two castellanies, Wojnicz and Nowy Sącz, in the extreme south of the Seniorate Province.

== Castles ==
=== Wielka Wieś - Trzewlin Castle ===
Construction of Trzewlin Castle in Wielka Wieś, Tarnów County began in the early 14th century, and was initiated by the Białon family (Rawa coat of arms), which later changed its last name to Trzewliński. In the 15th century, the castle belonged to the Wielowieyski family (Półkozic coat of arms). According to 19th-century historian and ethnographer Żegota Pauli, in 1543 Trzewlin Castle was visited by King Sigismund I the Old, and his wife Bona Sforza, to escape an epidemic. It is not known when the castle was abandoned. Most likely, it was destroyed during the Swedish invasion of Poland (1655–1660), and in the late 17th century, its walls were pulled down by the residents of Wojnicz. All that remains are a dry moat and small remnants of the walls.

Trzewlin Castle was located on a hill called Panieńska Gora, on the left bank of the Dunajec, rising 120 meters above the river valley. The complex consisted of three parts: the upper castle (square-shaped, with measurements 40 by 40 meters), the lower castle (triangular shaped), and a round fortified settlement, separated from both castles by the moat. The ruins are some 12 kilometers southwest of Tarnów, and 3 kilometers south of Wojnicz.

=== Melsztyn – Melsztyn Castle (ruin) ===
The castellan of Kraków, Spicymir (Leliwa coat of arms) started the construction of Melsztyn Castle in 1340. In 1362, Bishop Bodzanta blessed the Holy Spirit chapel in the castle. For 200 years the complex remained in the hands of the powerful noble family of Leliwita Melsztyński (see Spytek of Melsztyn), who in the late 14th century built a Gothic keep, located in the west wing of the castle. In the 15th century, Melsztyn was one of centres of the Polish Hussite movement, and in 1511, Jan Melsztyński sold it to the castellan of Wiślica, Mikołaj Jordan of Myślenice. Around 1546, Spytek Jordan ordered the remodelling of the Gothic keep, turning it into a Renaissance residence. After the marriages of his two daughters, Melsztyn became the property of the Tarło family, and in 1744, it came into the hands of the Lanckoroński family.

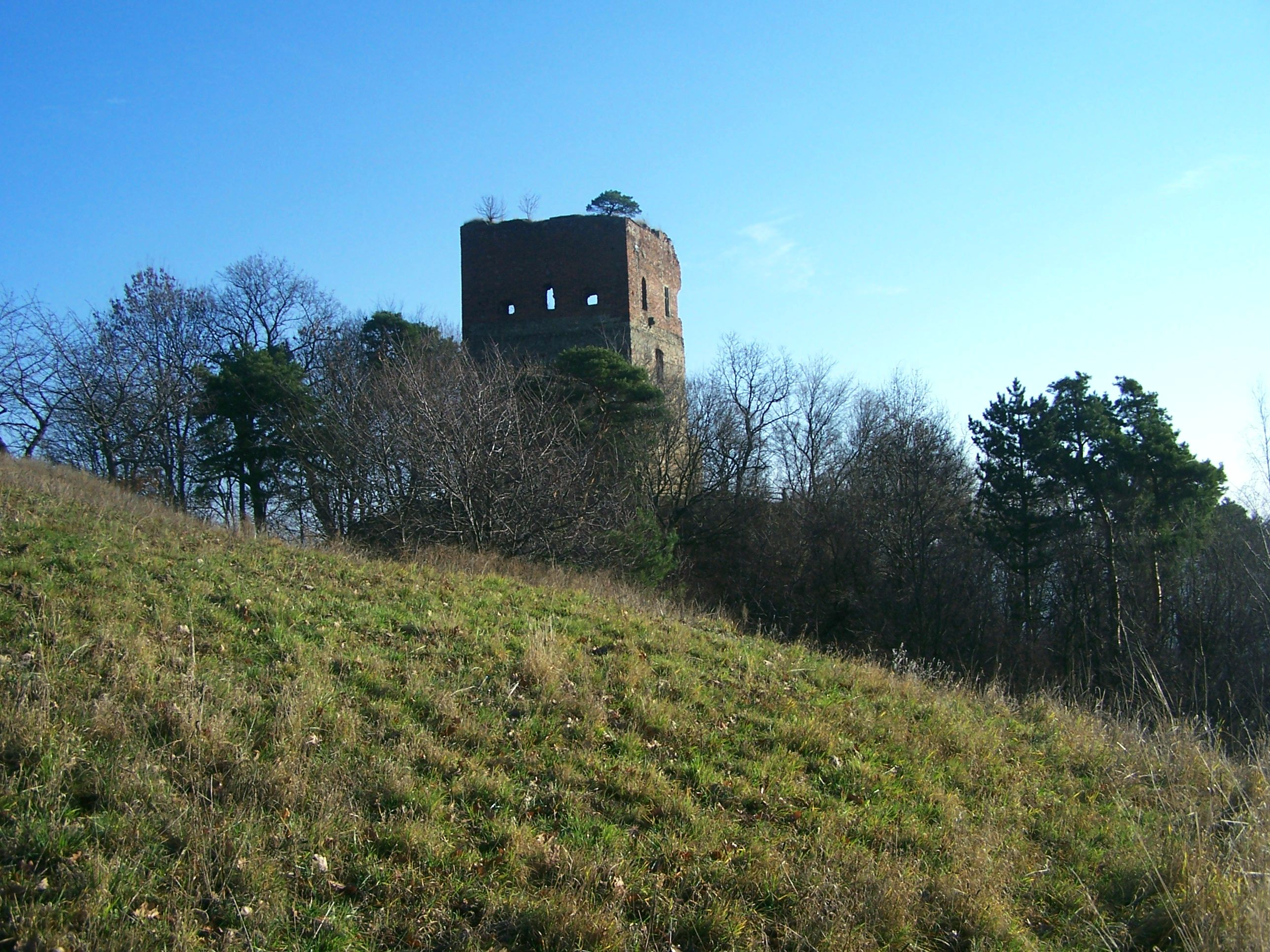
Ruins of the Melsztyn Castle

Melsztyn Castle was destroyed by the Russians in 1771, during the Bar Confederation, and has been a ruin since. In 1789–1796, parts of the complex were pulled down, for building material for a church at Domosławice. In the following years, the ruins were neglected, which resulted in the collapse of the keep (1846). In 1879-85, due to the efforts of Karol Lanckoroński, the castle gained the status of a permanent, protected ruin. Since 2008, it has belonged to the gmina of Zakliczyn. The castle features in paintings of Jan Matejko, Napoleon Orda, and Maciej Bogusz Steczyński. Melsztyn Castle is located near regional road nr. 980, which goes from Nowy Sącz to Tarnow.

=== Czchów – Czchów Castle (ruin) ===
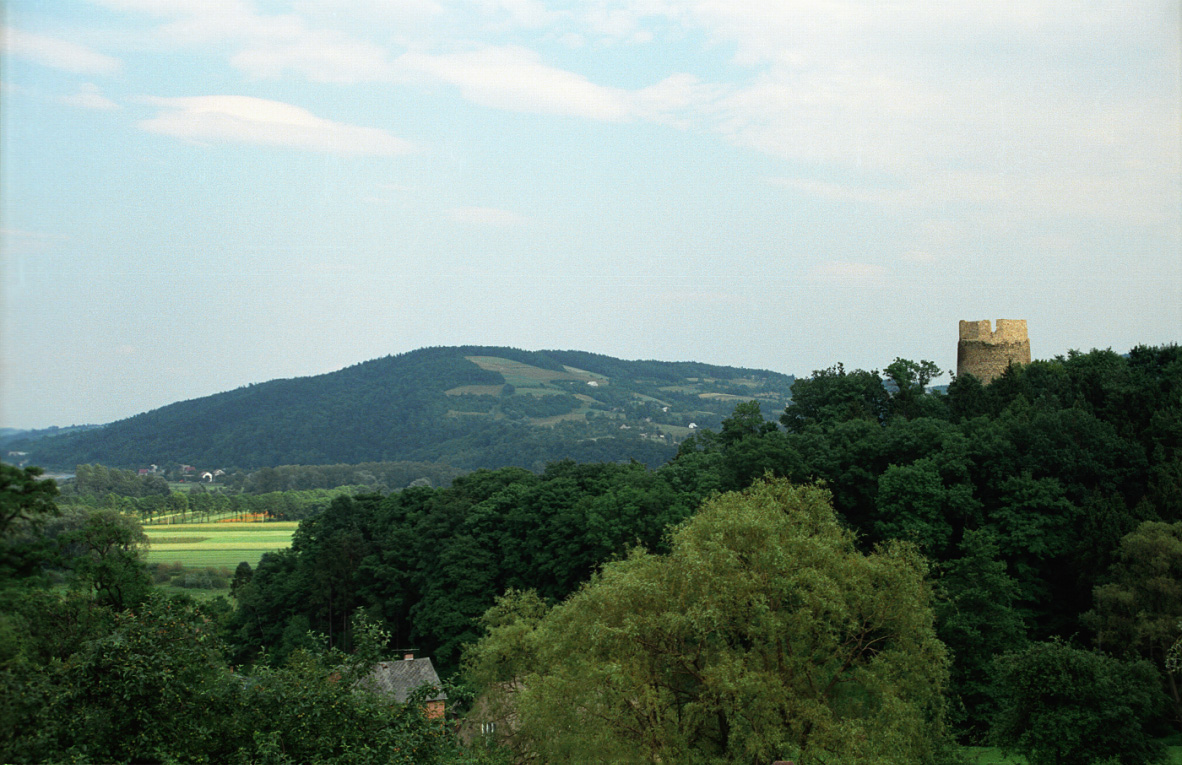
Ruins of the Czchów Castle

The history of the Czchów Castle dates back to the 13th century, when a Romanesque watchtower was built there. In the 14th century, a defensive castle was added to the tower. It became the residence of the Czchów starostas, and was destroyed in the Swedish wars of the mid-17th century (see Deluge). Finally, when the castle lost its military importance it was turned into a prison, which was closed in 1772, after the first partition of Poland. Currently, the only remaining parts of the building are a 14th-century tower and foundations of the defensive wall. The tower is open to visitors from May to October 31.

=== Wytrzyszczka – Tropsztyn Castle (reconstructed) ===
Tropsztyn Castle was probably built in the early 13th century by the Ośmioróg family. It was first mentioned in 1231, and remained in the hands of the family for 300 years. A royal edict of 1535 handed Tropsztyn to the castellan of Sandomierz, Piotr Kmita. Some time in the second half of the 16th century, it probably became the hide-out of highwaymen, as it was partially destroyed in 1574 by the owners of Rożnów, due to the “assaults, organized from the castle”. By 1608, Tropsztyn, which belonged to the Zborowski family, already was described as a ruin.

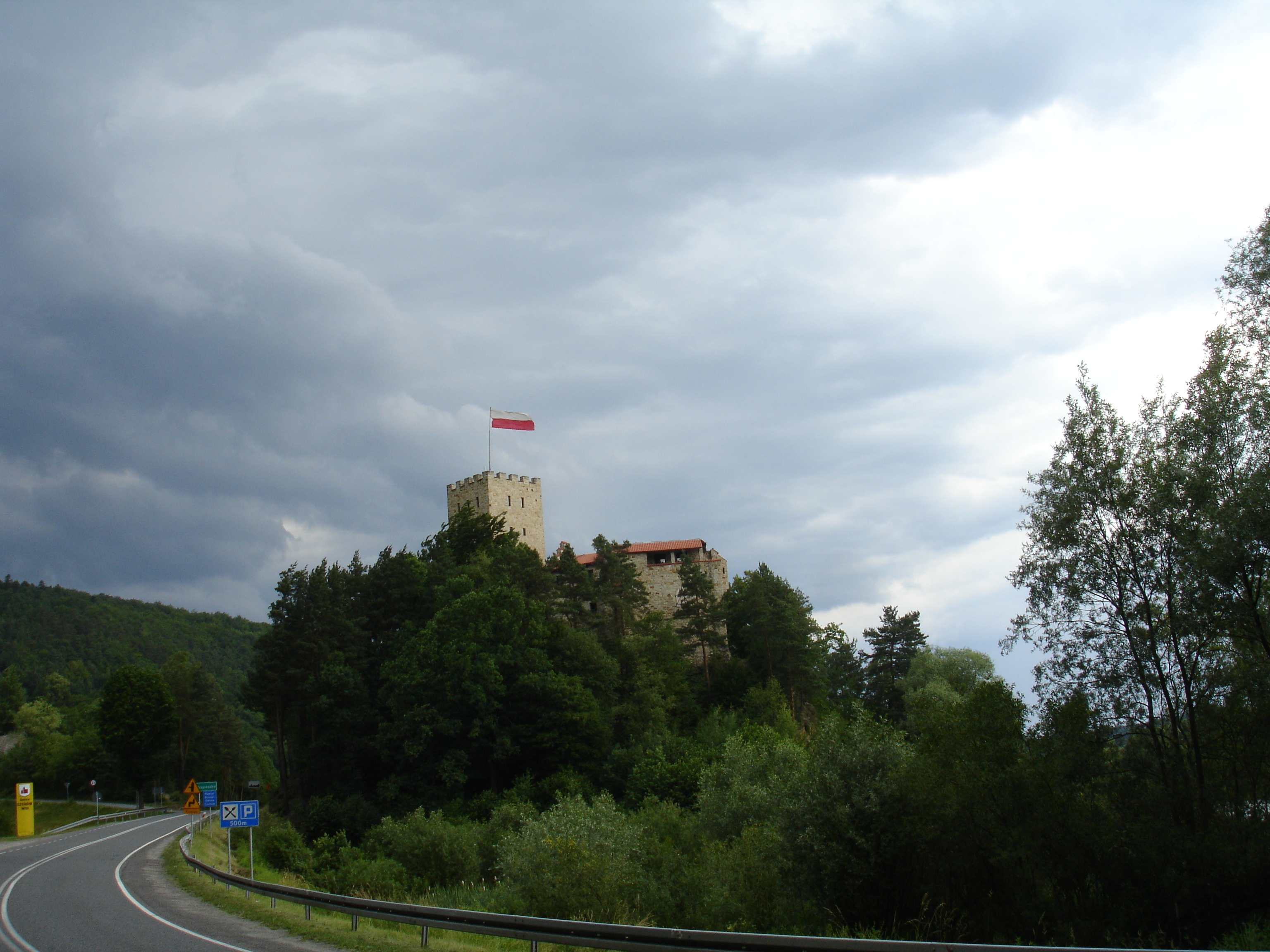
Tropsztyn Castle

Archaeological works were carried out in 1863 by a Nowy Sącz historian, Feliks Jan Szczęsny Morawski. In 1970, it was purchased by Andrzej Benesz, and Tropsztyn was reconstructed in 1993. Now the castle is open to visitors in July and August. According to legend, an Inca treasure is hidden somewhere in Tropsztyn, as its late 18th century owner, Sebastian Berzewiczy, went to Spanish Peru, where he married an Inca princess, and returned to Poland with the treasure.

=== Rożnów – Rożnów Castle (reconstructed) ===
Rożnów Castle, located 20 kilometers north of Nowy Sącz, consists of a medieval “upper castle” and Renaissance fortifications (“lower castle”). Its history dates back to the 13th century, when the Gryfita family built a watchtower. The castle itself was probably built in 1350–1370 by Piotr Rozen (Gryf coat of arms). It is oblong in shape, 44 meters by 20 meters. In 1426, the castle was purchased by one of the most famous Polish knights, Zawisza Czarny, and after his death, it belonged to his sons. In the late 15th century, Rożnów passed to the Wydźga family, and later, to the Tarnowski family.

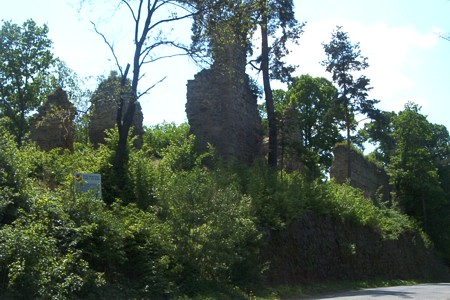
Rożnów Castle

In the first half of the 16th century, during the Polish Golden Age, Hetman Jan Tarnowski began to reconstruct the fortress at Rożnów. He planned one of the most effective fortresses in the Polish–Lithuanian Commonwealth, guarding the southern border of the nation against the Ottoman Empire, which, after the Battle of Mohács emerged as the dominant state in Southeastern Europe. Tarnowski’s death in 1561 put an end to these plans, and the construction was never completed.

=== Gródek nad Dunajcem – Gródek nad Dunajcem Castle (no longer exists) ===
Gródek nad Dunajcem Castle was probably built in the early 14th century by Klemens de Gródek, on the Grodzisko Hill in the village of Gródek nad Dunajcem. The building was destroyed either in the late 14th or early 15th century, its ruins were visible as late as early 20th century. Currently, no traces remain of the castle, and the Grodzisko Hill is an island (called Monkey Island) on the Rożnowskie Lake.

=== Kurów – Kurowska Góra Hill Castle (no longer exists) ===
Kurowska Góra Castle also known as Curow castrum in 1308 and later was mentioned by Jan Długosz. For some time, the estate probably belonged to Bishop Jan Muskata. Little is known about the castle, which was located in the village of Kurów. Some sources record it as Lemiesz Castle.

=== Nowy Sącz – Royal Castle ===
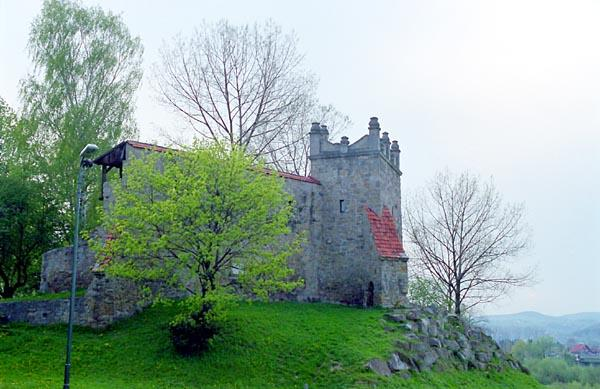
Nowy Sącz Castle

=== Zabrzeż – Zabrzeż Castle (ruin) ===
This medieval castle was in the village of Zabrzeż, near Nowy Sącz, on the left bank of the Kamienica river, near its confluence with the Dunajec, 84 meters above the riverbed. In ancient times, this had been a Lusatian Gords settlement, and in the 13th century, a small defensive castle was built. It was built in stone, in a circular shape with a circumference of some 30 meters. What remains now are traces of the moat. Historians have been unable to establish the owners of the castle, as there are very few documents. The village of Zabrzez itself was first mentioned in 1312. Furthermore, it is not known when the castle was destroyed nor by whom. Remains of the walls were still visible in the early 20th century.

=== Krościenko nad Dunajcem – Pieniny Castle ===
The ancient castle was built on the northern slope of a steep hill, several meters below its summit, in the immediate vicinity of the Trzy Korony peaks in the Pieniny Mountains. The building was small, due to lack of space, but placed in a spot which provided a natural defence. The length of the defensive walls was 88 meters, and the walls were 1 meter thick, made from the local limestone rock. The gate was in western part of the castle, below which cellars were built. According to Jan Długosz, during the disastrous Mongol invasion of Poland (1259), Prince Bolesław V the Chaste fled to Pieniny Castle also referred to as Castro Pyeniny, together with his mother and wife Kinga of Poland. Historians however doubt Długosz, asserting that construction of the castle was not started till the 1280s. The castle guarded the southern border of Lesser Poland, and probably was abandoned by the first half of the 14th century and was destroyed in the 15th century (most likely in 1433, during a Hussite raid.

=== Niedzica – Dunajec Castle ===
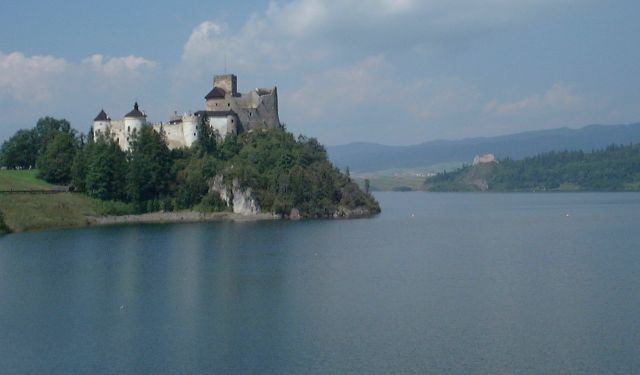
Niedzica Castle

.

=== Czorsztyn – Czorsztyn Castle ===
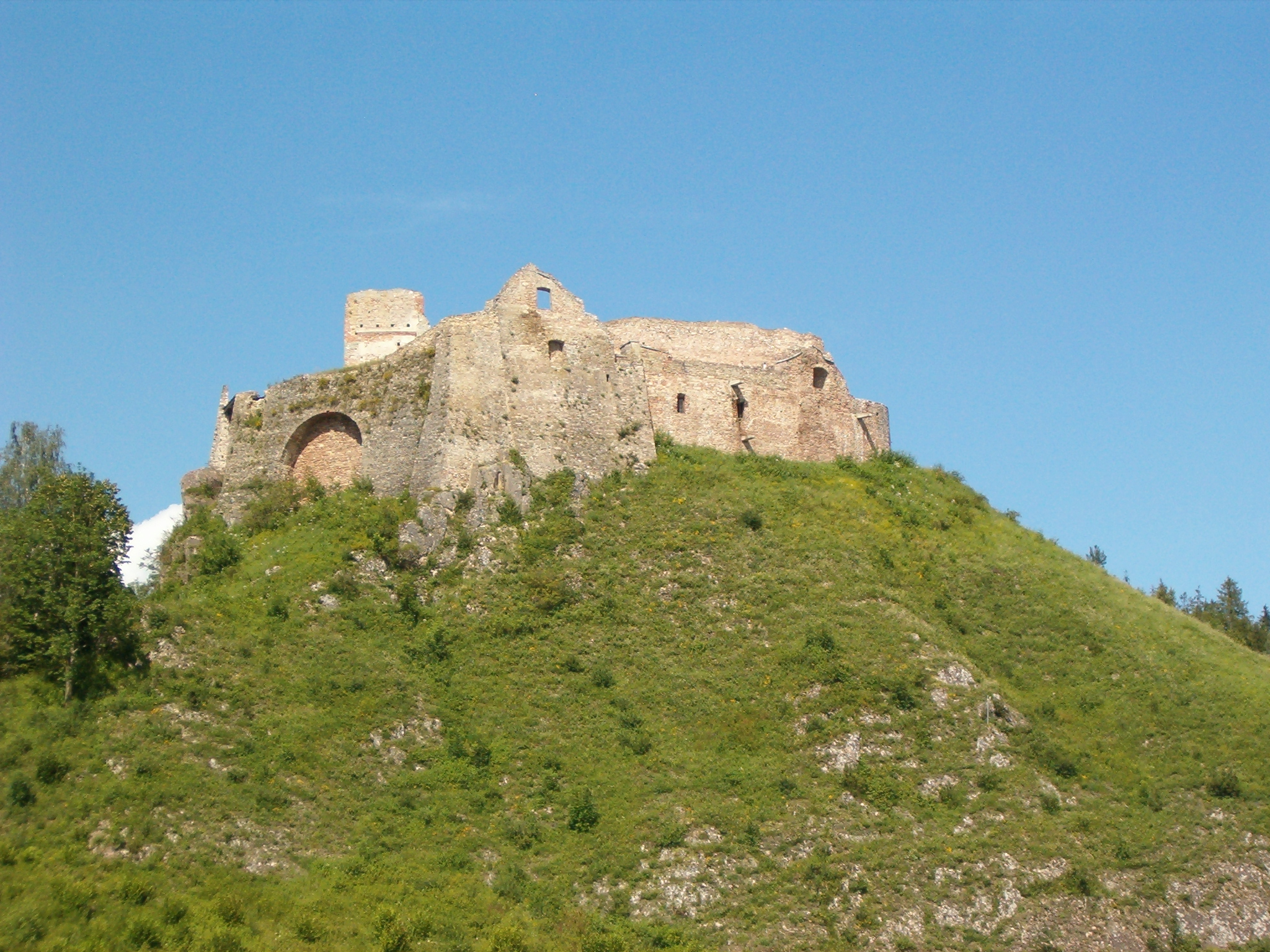
Czorsztyn Castle

.

=== Szaflary – Szaflary Castle (ruin) ===
The castle was located on a limestone rock, on the left bank of the White Dunajec. In the 13th and 14th centuries, together with the village of Szaflary, it belonged to the Cistercian abbey from Ludźmierz and Szczyrzyc. In 1380, it became royal property. In 1470–80, during the reign of Casimir IV Jagiellon, the castle was rented to a local nobleman Piotr Komorowski. Three years later, Szaflary was taken away from him, as a punishment for his support of Hungarian King Matthias Corvinus. Afterwards, the fortalitium Schaflari turned into a ruin.

Szaflary Castle stood on a flat hilltop, measuring of 20 by 30 meters. It was surrounded by a wall, which was in ca. 1474 strengthened by a rampart. Currently, a house stands on the spot where the castle once stood. All that remains of the castle are parts of the 14th century defensive wall, together with the rampart.

== Gords along the Dunajec ==
The upper Dunajec is a river which flows among hills, and on several of them along the valley there are remains of early Medieval gords. At Wojnicz, a 10th-century Slavic settlement once existed on a dry island a few meters above the swam. The settlement became a castellany, and turned into the town of Wojnicz. Other gords and settlements were located at:

- Zawada Lanckorońska (9th-11th centuries, on a hill called Zamczysko)
- Białawoda - remains of the Lusatian culture gord, located on the Białawodzka Góra Hill
- Kurów - another Lusatian gord on the Kurowska Góra Hill
- Marcinkowice - remains of a Lusatian gord, which in the 9th century was seized by the Slavs, on a hill called Grodzisko
- Chełmiec - a Lusatian, later Slavic gord on the Chelm hill
- Podegrodzie - two early Piast dynasty gords on two hills
- Naszczowice - Lusatian and early Piast gord on the Zamczysko Hill
- Maszkowice - Lusatian gord on the Góra Zyndrama Hill
- Zabrzeż - Lusatian gord on the Babia Góra Hill

== See also ==
- Dunajec River Gorge
- Pieniny National Park (Poland)
- Trail of the Eagles' Nests
- List of castles in Poland
- Tourism in Poland
