= Czorsztyn =

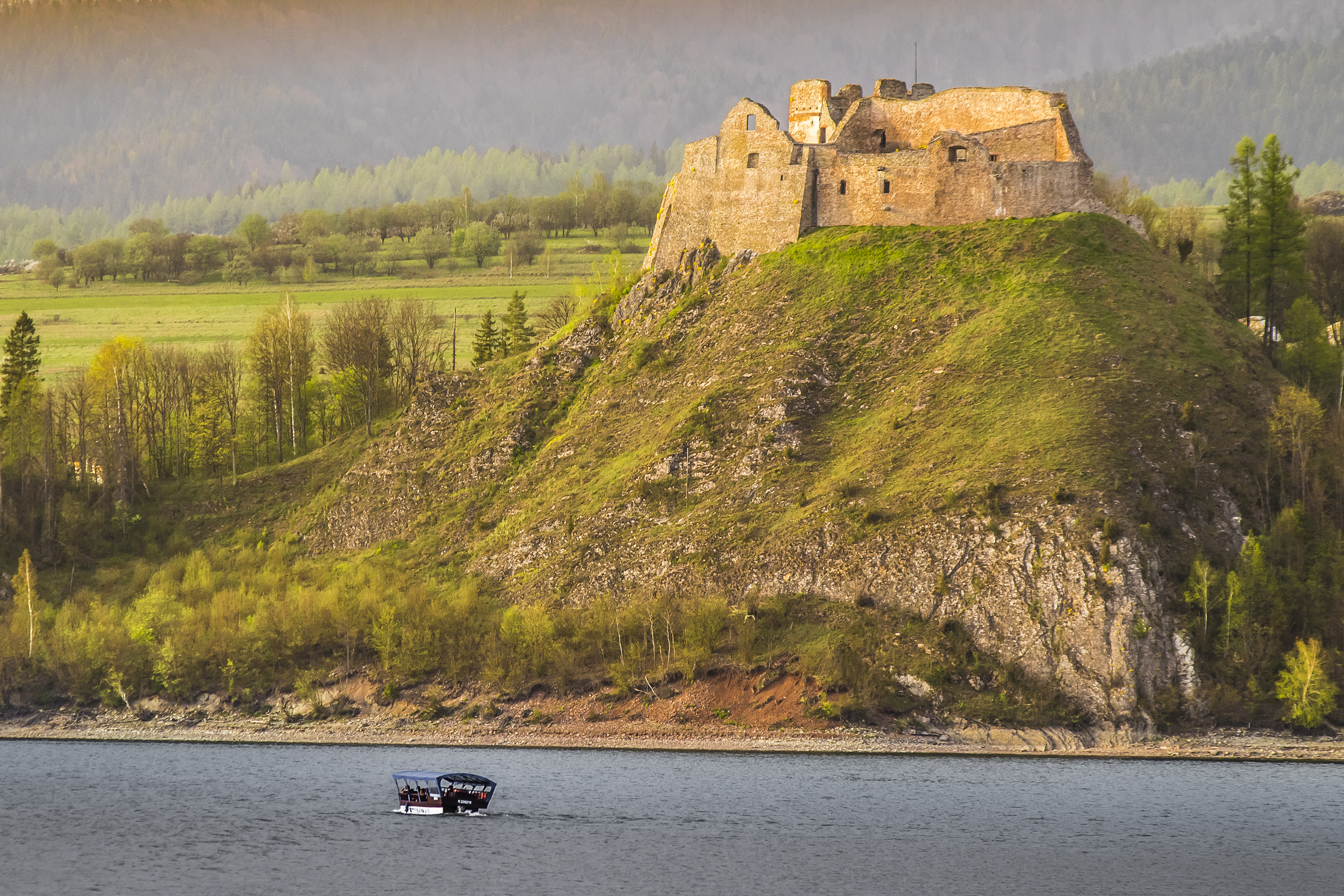
- Czorsztyn Castle ruins

- Location within Poland
- Coordinates: 49°26′N 20°19′E
- Country: Poland
- Voivodeship: Lesser Poland
- County: Nowy Targ
- Gmina: Czorsztyn

Population (2008)
  - Total: 365
- Time zone: UTC+1 (CET)
  - Summer (DST): UTC+2 (CEST)
- Postal code: 34-436
- Area code: +48 18
- Car plates: KNT

Czorsztyn [ˈt͡ʂɔrʂtɨn] (German: Schorstin) is a village in Poland, in Lesser Poland Voivodeship, Nowy Targ County. The village lies in Pieniny, the mountain range on the current Polish-Slovak border. It is famous for the ruins of a 14th-17th-century castle, which was the scene of the Kostka-Napierski Uprising in 1651.

== Highlights ==
Czorsztyn gave its name to the man-made reservoir also known as Lake Czorsztyn, completed in 1994. The village along with its mountainous surroundings is a recreational destination with well developed tourist infrastructure: accommodations, pleasure-boats dock, and numerous marked hiking trails.

== Gallery ==
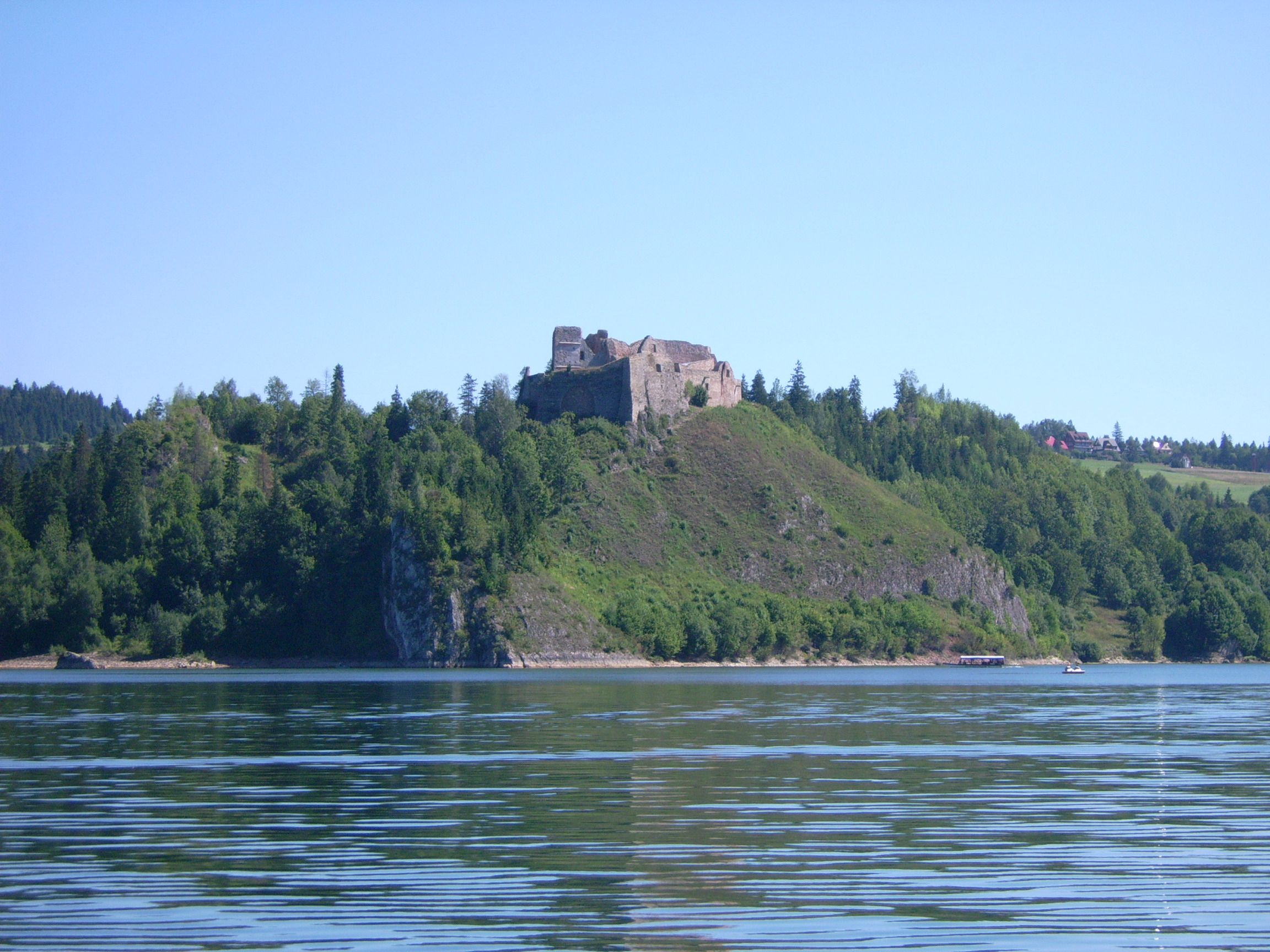
Czorsztyn Castle and lake panorama

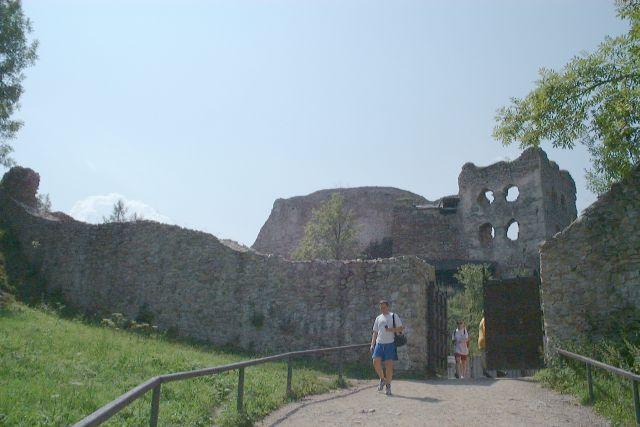
Entrance

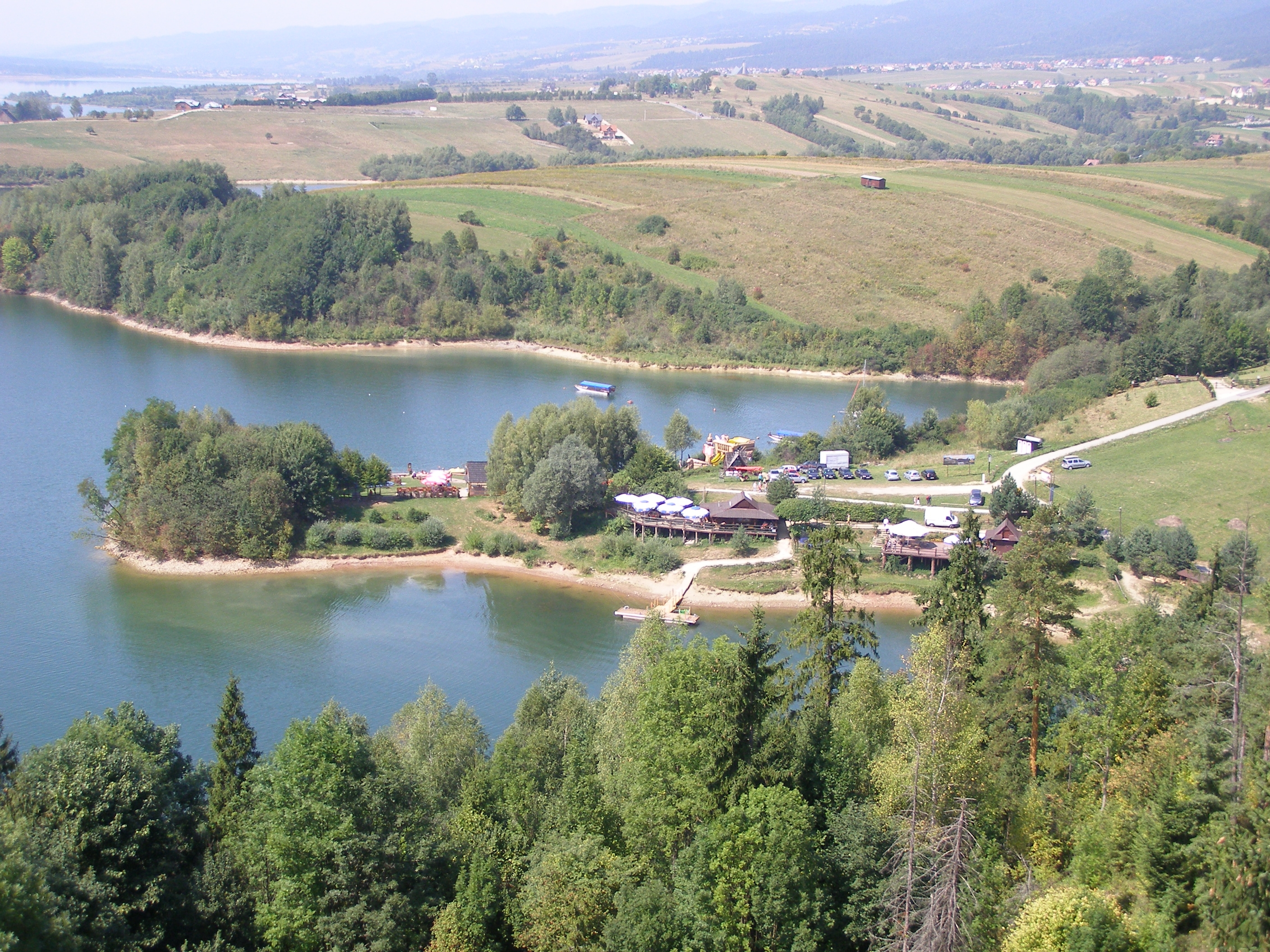
View of marina down from Czorsztyn Castle

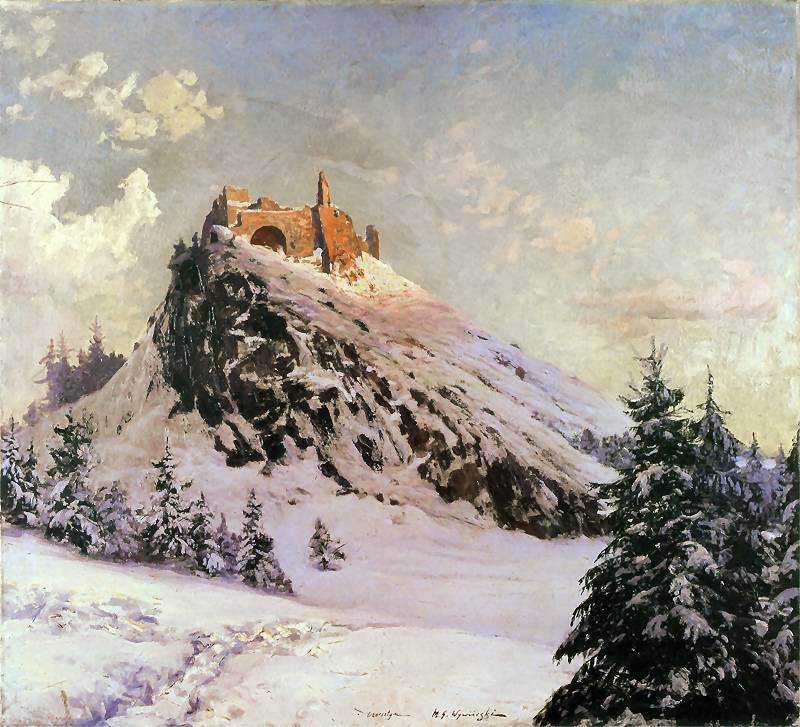
Czorsztyn castle (1911), oil painting by Michał Gorstkin-Wywiórski

== See also ==
- Dunajec River Gorge
- Niedzica Castle
- Pieniny National Park (Poland)
- Trzy Korony massif
