= Niedzica Castle =

Castle in Poland

Coordinates: 49°25′20″N 20°19′11″E

Niedzica Castle (Dunajec Castle)
- Zamek Dunajec (Polish)
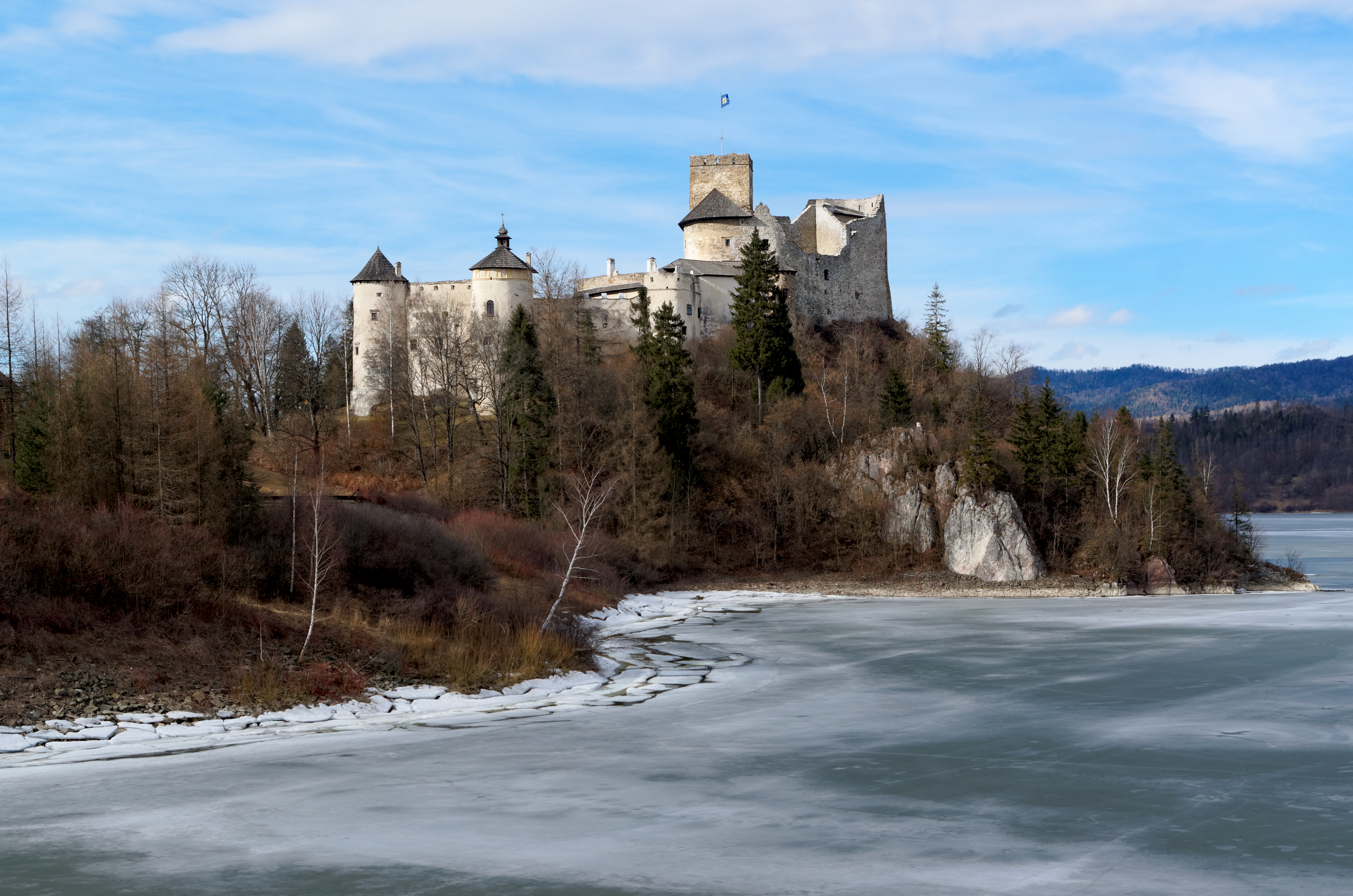
- Niedzica Castle during winter
- Interactive map of Niedzica Castle (Dunajec Castle)
- Location: Niedzica-Zamek, Poland

History
- Built: XIV c.

Site notes
- Architectural style: Gothic

Niedzica Castle, also known as Dunajec Castle (Latin: Castrum de Dunajecz, Hungarian: Nedec Váralja / Nedec-Vár, German: Sub-Arx Unterschloss, Slovak: Nedecký hrad), is located in the southernmost part of Poland in Niedzica (Nowy Targ County in Lesser Poland). It was erected between the years 1320 and 1326 by Kokos of Brezovica on the site of an ancient stronghold surrounded by earthen walls in the Pieniny mountains.

The Niedzica Castle stands at an altitude of 566 m, on a hill 300 metres (980 ft) upstream from the Dunajec River mouth, measured from the center of the dam on Lake Czorsztyn. The outline of Niedzica Castle can best be viewed from the ruins of Czorsztyn Castle on the other side of the lake. It is known as one of the most picturesque castles in the country and adorns the covers of many books.

== History ==
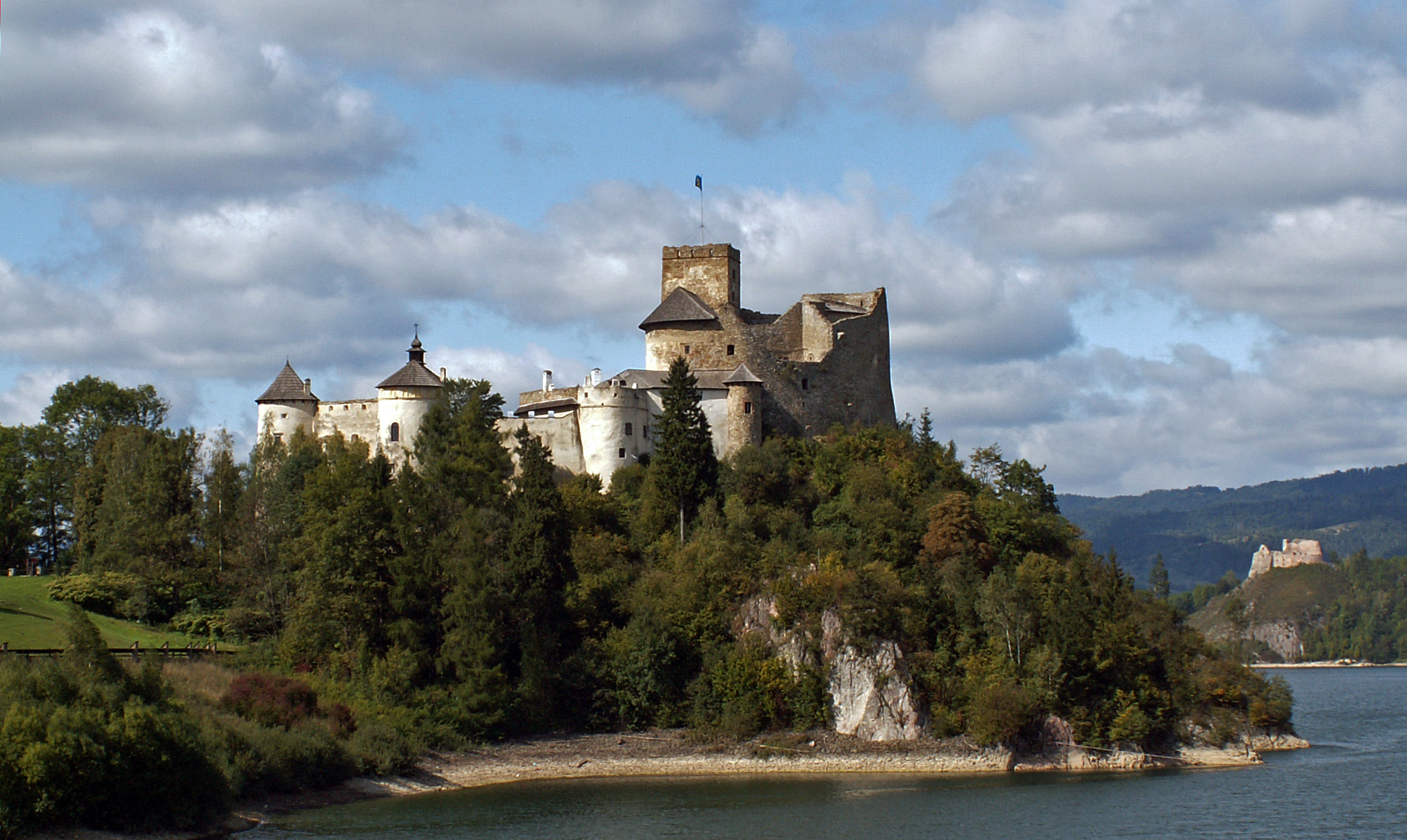
Niedzica Castle at Lake Czorsztyn

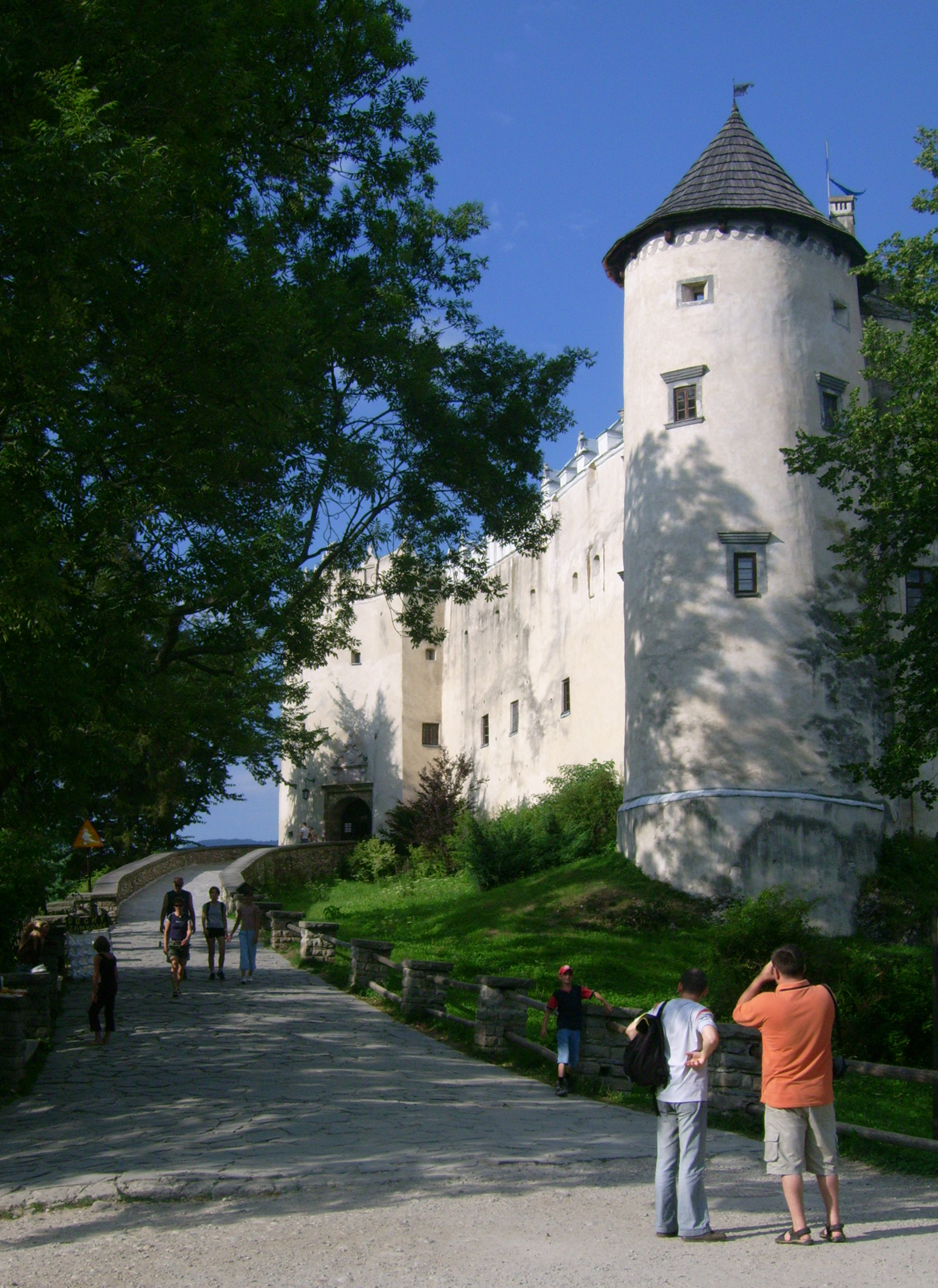
Entrance to the castle

The castle was an important centre of Polish-Hungarian relations since the 14th century. It was a place where the money lent by the Polish king to the Hungarian king Sigismund had to be returned following an agreement signed in 1412. Once the loan was paid back, the Polish king returned the 16 Spiš towns given to him by Sigismund as collateral. For centuries the castle was a border-post with Hungary. At the time of the Turkish invasion five hundred years ago, a deal was struck at Niedzica to make it a Polish protectorate.

The castle was built by a Hungarian known as Kokos from Brezovica with family rights dating back to 1325. In 1470 it became the property of the aristocratic Zápolya family. However, in 1528, the entire county including the castle was given away by John Zápolya aspiring to the Hungarian throne, and became the property of William Drugeth who received it as a reward for his support. Sixty years later it became the property of Hieronim Łaski and his son Olbracht. At the end of the 16th century the castle was bought by Ján Horváth from Plaveč. The fortress was renovated many times in the fifteenth, sixteenth, eighteenth and in the beginning of the 19th century by its successive owners. The last Hungarian inhabitants remained there until in 1943 when the coming of the front in World War II inspired the Salamon family to abandon it. The last countess left with her children two years before the Red Army marched in. The final reconstruction of the castle was completed in 1963 under the supervision of the Polish Ministry of Culture. It has served as a historical museum ever since.

== Recent conservation concerns ==
A new artificial reservoir, Lake Czorsztyn, was created in 1994 by damming the Dunajec River downstream of the castle. The castle now stands approx. 30 metres (98 ft) above the upper water level. The castle hill consists of limestone rock saddled on shale and marl found much below the current bed of the Dunajec River. Studies and analyses show that rock strata forming the limestone bank are weather-resistant, and provide secure foundation for the castle in spite of visible surface deterioration. In order to secure the stability of the hill, a number of reinforcing works were effected in the strip between the high- and low-water marks. The works include concrete reinforcement of rocks, substratum (weathered shale and marl) replacement, and surface protection elements on the hill. The castle and the hill are subject to constant monitoring.

== The museum ==
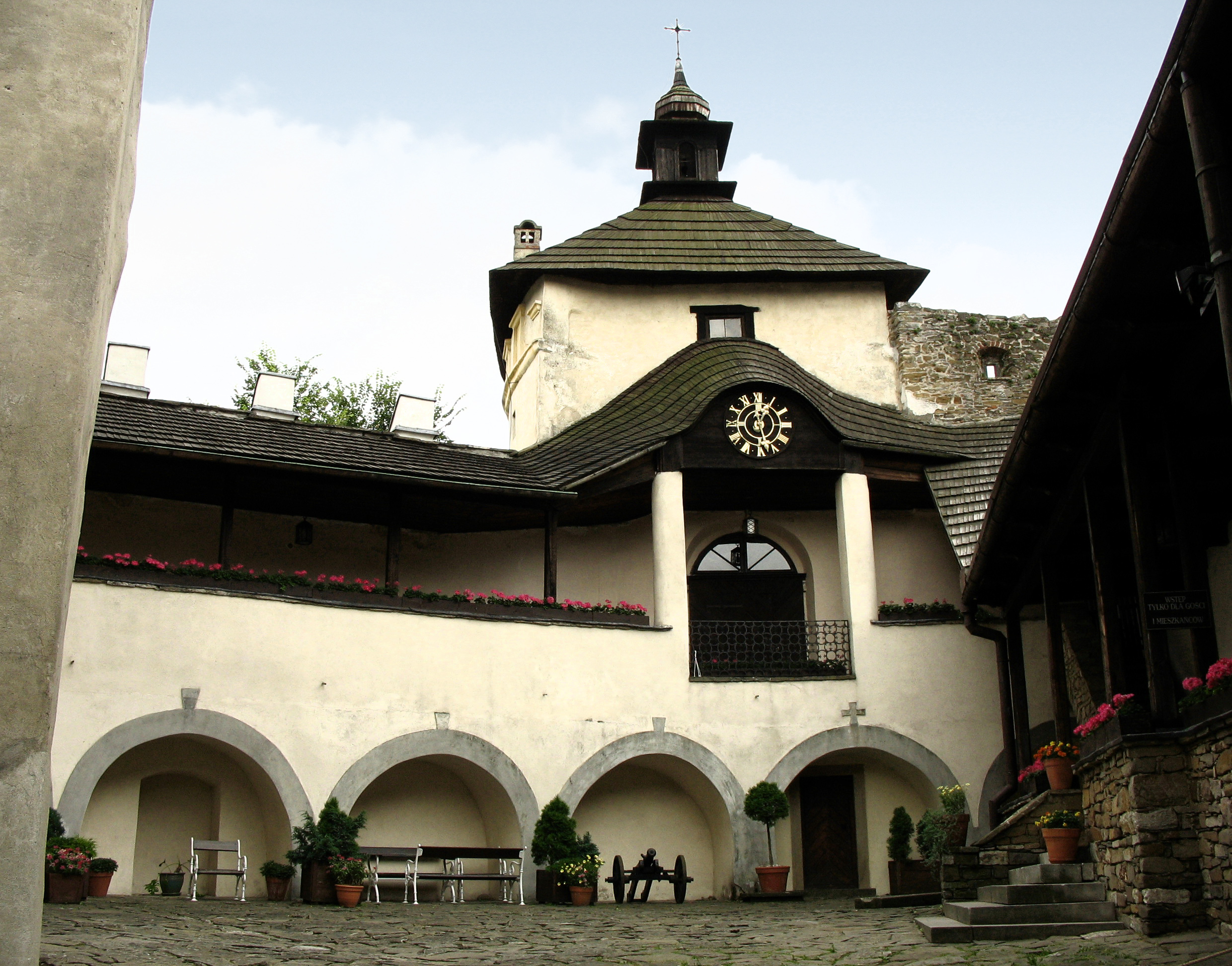
Niedzica Castle courtyard

Although in large part only ruins remain of what used to be the Gothic castle in Niedzica, its dungeons and a number of rooms survived, as have some of the paintings — including the Crucifixion that once adorned the chapel — and furnishings which are not entirely as they were in the 1930s. The architectural design consists of a densely packed complex of buildings with a courtyard surrounded by residential wings with arcades, towers and fortified walls.

The museum in Niedzica holds archaeological artifacts related to the castle, remnants of the masonry that once adorned its interiors, prints and engravings with views of the castle from various periods, and historical documentation. The museum's collections include ethnographic exhibits from the Spiš region, a collection of antique clocks, 18th and 19th century pistols, hunting rifles, and taxidermied game. In 1996, a new collection was added. Because of the fortress's Hungarian origins, Ákos Engelmayer, Hungarian ambassador to Poland (1990-1995), donated his collection of Hungarian-related items of historical interest from Poland, such as maps of Hungary from the sixteenth to the twentieth centuries, engravings depicting various Hungarian kings and castles, as well as cities and battlegrounds; which it is hoped have become the largest collection of Hungarian-related materials outside of Hungary. The castle is a great place to visit. The views are magnificent, particularly to the south over the Pieniny mountains.

== The legend ==
Before the Czorsztyn reservoir was built, the castle had a very Dracula-like setting, perched high on a wall above the Dunajec River. It was a place rich in tales and legends with some of the former residents resembling characters from gothic novels. In the post-World War II period Polish newspapers wrote at length about Sebastián Berzeviczy (one of Niedzica's owners) who traveled to the New World in the 18th century. According to a popular legend, he fell in love with the alleged Inca princess. Their daughter Umina married the nephew of an Inca insurrection leader Túpac Amaru II, whose assumed name implied descent from Inca kings. Túpac Amaru was eventually executed by the Spaniards after rebelling against the colonial government. The legend goes on to claim that the sacred scrolls of the Incas had been handed down to his surviving family members. His nephew, Andrés Túpac Amaru a.k.a. Andreas with wife Umina and his father-in-law Sebastián Berzeviczy fled to Italy, where Andrés was killed in suspicious circumstances. Consequently, Umina with son and her father fled to Hungary and settled at the castle. Sources claim that Umina was assassinated there some time later. Her testament to son Anton, written in 1797 and stored there, allegedly contained information about the lost treasure of the Incas. There was a leaden case found at the castle with some “quipu” writings, but it was lost in Kraków in the following years. Later, news appeared about expeditions searching for fantastic treasures at Lake Titicaca in Peru. The notion that the Inca treasure map could be hidden somewhere in the depths of the castle is still cherished today.

Other tales follow the exploits of a motley crew of the castle's other former owners. They include stories of counts and jesters who tortured village folk, stabbed priests and misbehaved.

== The graphic novel ==
The legend of Niedzica was also the inspiration for a graphic novel, "Rainbow and the Sun" by Roko Zaper, which follows Andre Benesz as he discovers his heritage and the past he never knew.

== Gallery ==
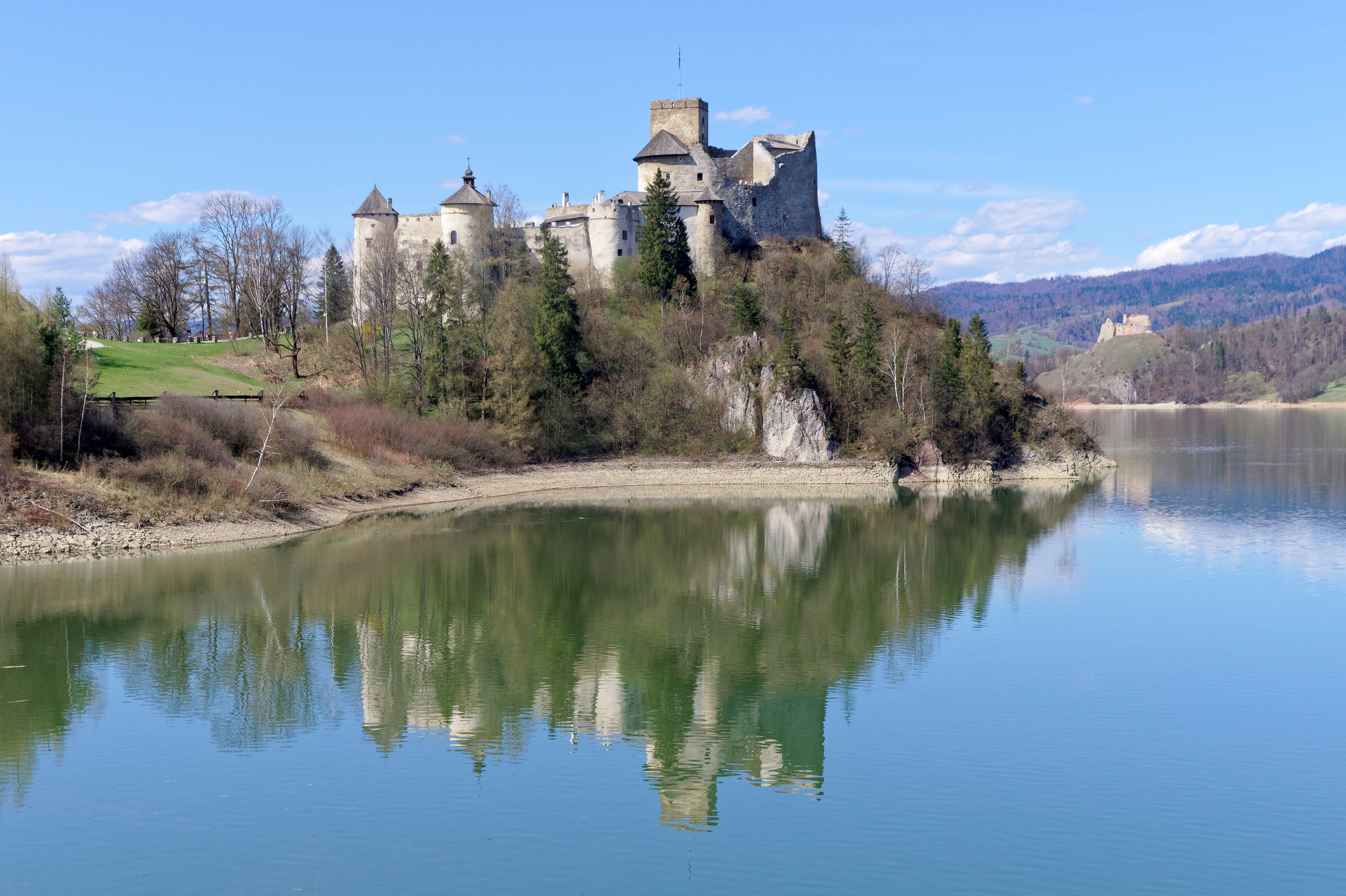
View of Niedzica Castle with the Czorsztyn Castle ruins in the background

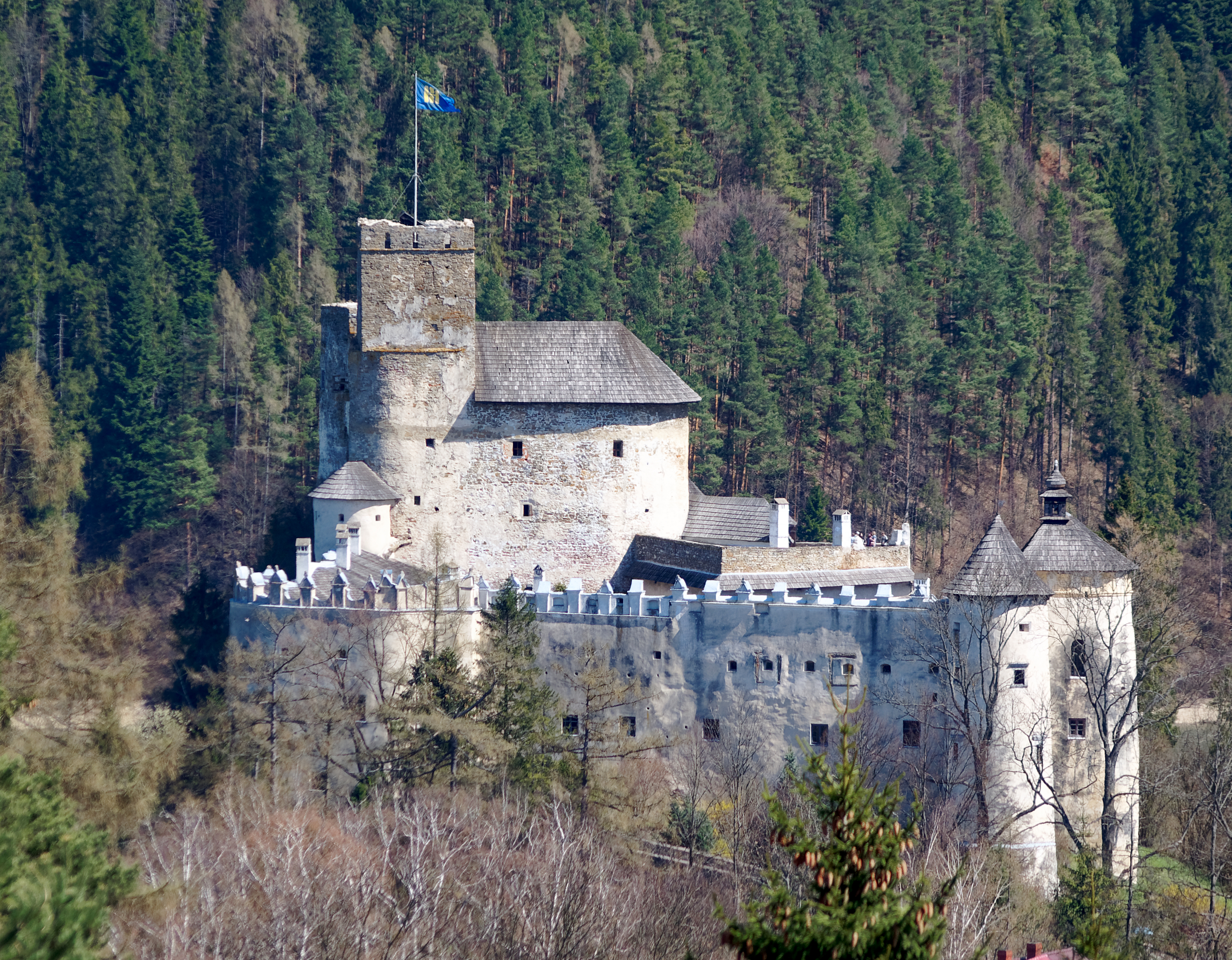
Aerial view of the castle

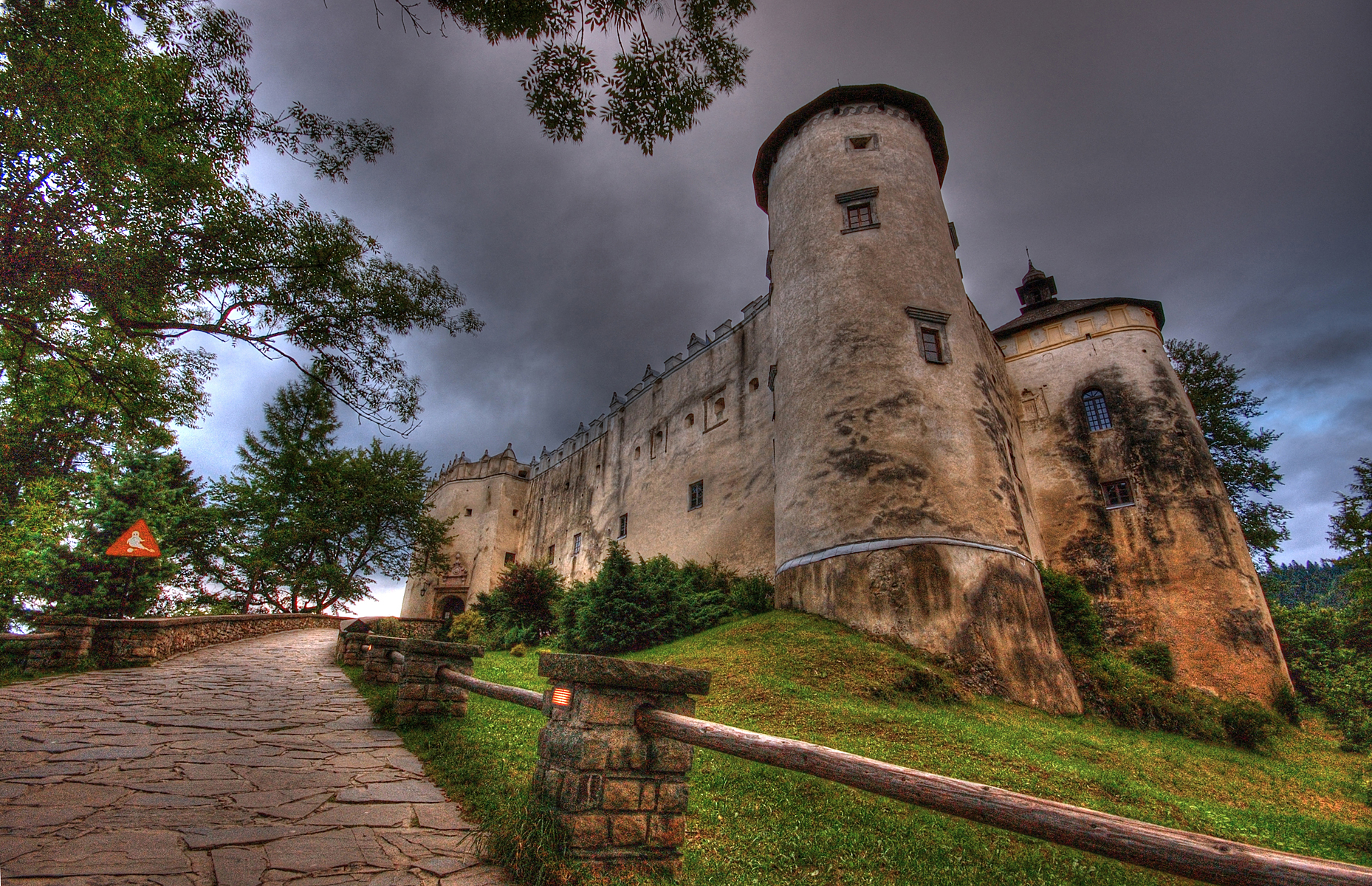
Niedzica Castle at dusk

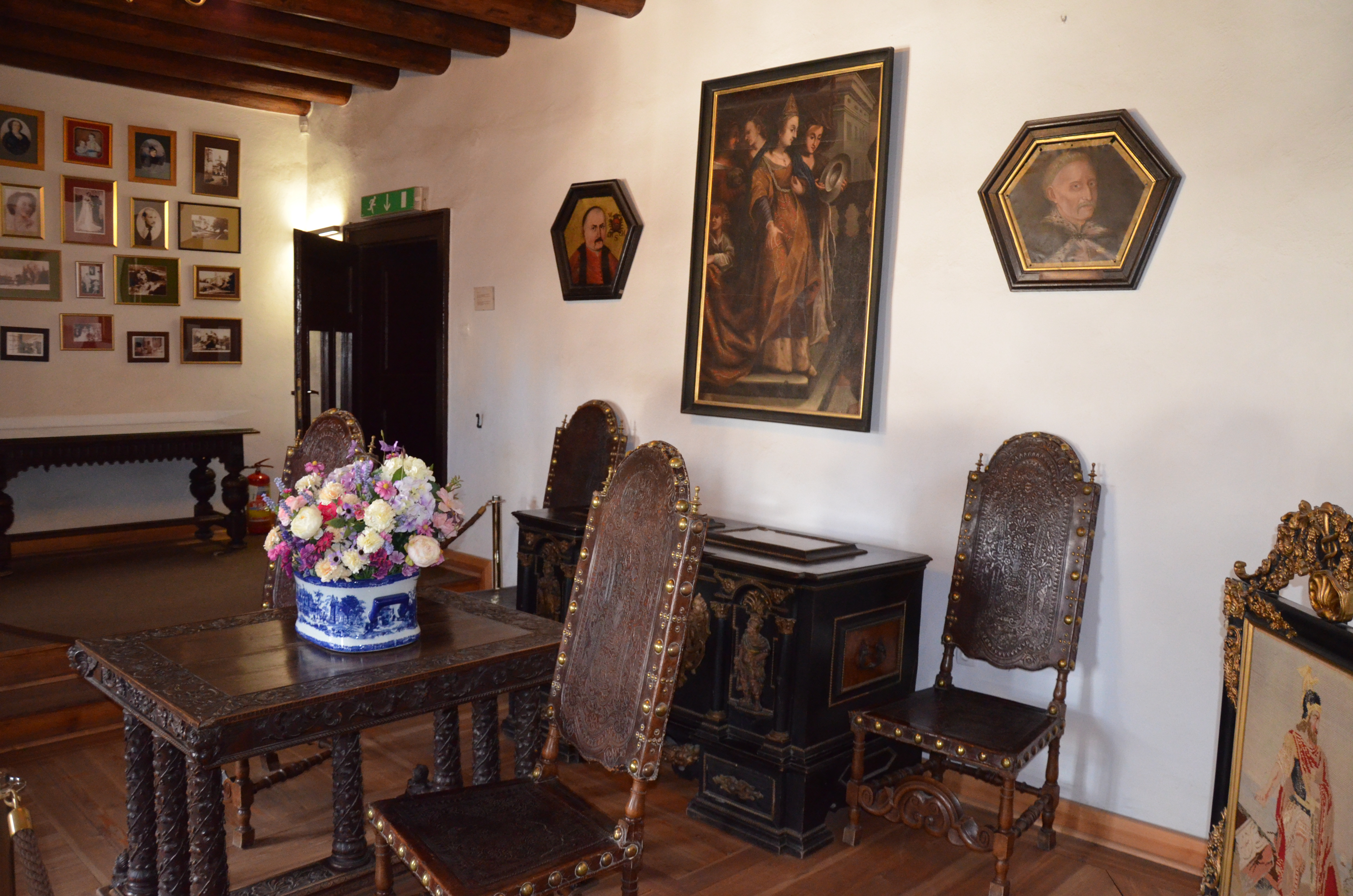
Castle interiors

== See also ==
- Dunajec river castles
- Pieniny National Park (Poland)
- Dunajec River Gorge
- Castles in Poland
