= Niedzica =

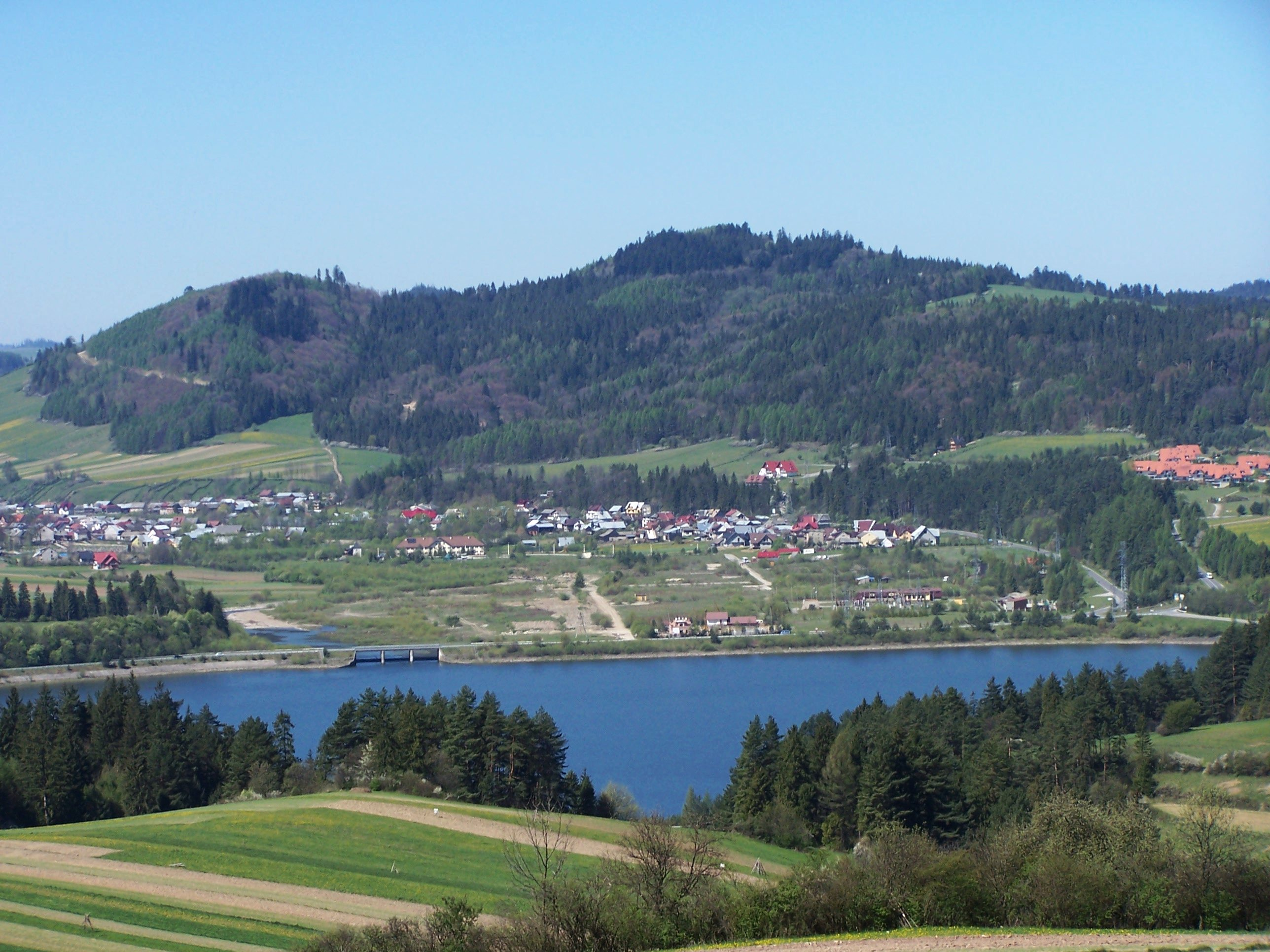
- Niedzica

- Location within Poland
- Coordinates: 49°26′N 20°18′E
- Country: Poland
- Voivodeship: Lesser Poland
- County: Nowy Targ
- Gmina: Łapsze Niżne
- First mentioned: 1320

Population (2006)
  - Total: 1,600
- Time zone: UTC+1 (CET)
  - Summer (DST): UTC+2 (CEST)
- Postal code: 34-441
- Area code: +48 18
- Car plates: KNT

Niedzica [ɲɛˈd͡ʑit͡sa] (Slovak: Nedeca, Hungarian: Nedec) is a resort village in Nowy Targ County of Lesser Poland province, Poland, located on the banks of Lake Czorsztyn. It is famous for Niedzica Castle, also known as Dunajec Castle.

== History ==
The area became part of Poland in the 10th or early 11th century, and later it passed to Hungary. The village was first mentioned in a written document in 1320 as villam Nisicz. The Niedzica Castle was built between 1320 and 1326 on foundations of a prehistoric roost, and was an important centre of Hungary–Poland relations. The area became again part of Poland following World War I. During World War II, from 1939 to 1945, it was occupied by the Slovak Republic.

Niedzica developed into a popular tourist destination as a result of the construction of the dam on Dunajec river between 1975 and 1997. Facilities close to the town centre include: the border crossing with Slovakia (2 km distance), the Pieniny hotel, the tourist apartment complex "Pod Taborem", Exhibition Hall, and the boat station for the raft ride down Dunajec River Gorge to Szczawnica resort town.

It is one of the 14 villages in the Polish part of the historical region of Spiš (Polish: Spisz).

== See also ==
- Pieniny National Park (Poland)
- Dunajec River Gorge
