= Dunajec River Gorge =

Gorge in Poland and Slovakia

Coordinates: 49.41333°N 20.42931°E

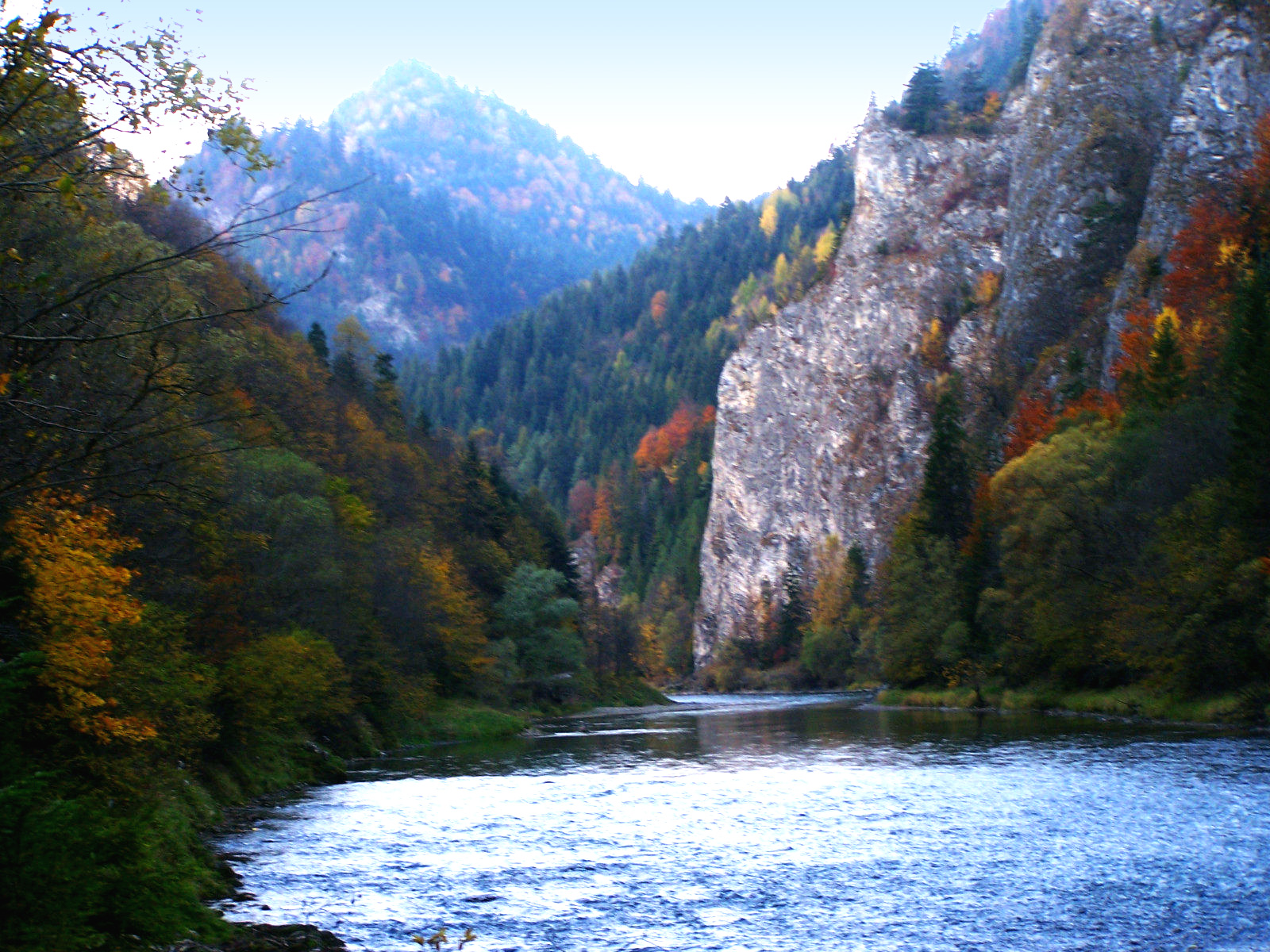
- Dunajec River Gorge, Lesser Poland Voivodeship
- Interactive map of Dunajec River Gorge

The Dunajec River Gorge (Polish: Przełom Dunajca; Slovak: Prielom Dunajca; German: Dohnst-Schlucht) runs through the Pieniny Mountains in the south of Poland and the north of Slovakia (as Dunajec is the border river between the two countries in the area). The gorge is characterized by some of the most interesting geological and geomorphological structures and area-specific natural ecosystems with little anthropogenic influence. It is featured on UNESCO's Tentative List of World Heritage Sites in Poland. The Gorge makes 7 loops in its length. The surrounding rock reaches 300 m in height almost all the way through.

== Geography ==
The gorge is part of a valley located within the Pieniny National Park. The landscape distinguishes it from surrounding mountains due to interaction of natural factors such as geological ground, relief, water, soil, climate, flora and fauna, and their evolutionary relationships. All these elements contribute to the complexity of the natural beauty of the whole area.

The conditions for the development of unique flora and fauna are closely related to the limestone and dolomite strata. Literally, the rock is the foundation for this one-of-a-kind environment. There is the occurrence of the Carpathians' plant and animal species, in many cases endemic. Their varied morphologic segmentation is responsible for the area's original and highly valuable aesthetic character.

From a botanical standpoint the Dunajec River Gorge serves as an example of area-specific vegetation dating back to the glacial age, even though the Pieniny Mountains were not glaciated. From a geographical standpoint it exists apart from the West Carpathians flora (Carpaticum occidentale) with their endemic and subendemic species. From a zoological standpoint the valleys cut in Mesozoic rocks have an extraordinary importance for preservation of many species and fauna of the Carpathians. Enormous segmentation of the terrain results in high concentration of biodiversity in a relatively small area.

The Dunajec River Gorge represents the main stages of geological and geomorphological evolution of mountain terrain from the early Cenozoic era to the Quaternary period including tectonic movement, geological structure, petrographic composition and proportion of rocks.

== Tourism ==
Dunajec Gorge is one of the best-known tourist attractions in the Pieniny Mountains. Wooden raft trips have been organized daily by Pieniny Gorals since the early 19th century — when their customers consisted mostly of guests of nearby Niedzica and Czorsztyn castles. The trip begins in the village of Sromowce Wyżne-Kąty, and ends in the resort town of Szczawnica, 18 km downstream. It takes about 2–3 hours. The second leg of the tour is only 5 km long. It begins in Szczawnica and ends in the town of Krościenko nad Dunajcem. It is also possible to view the gorge by foot or bicycle the whole length from the slovak bank side.

== Photos ==
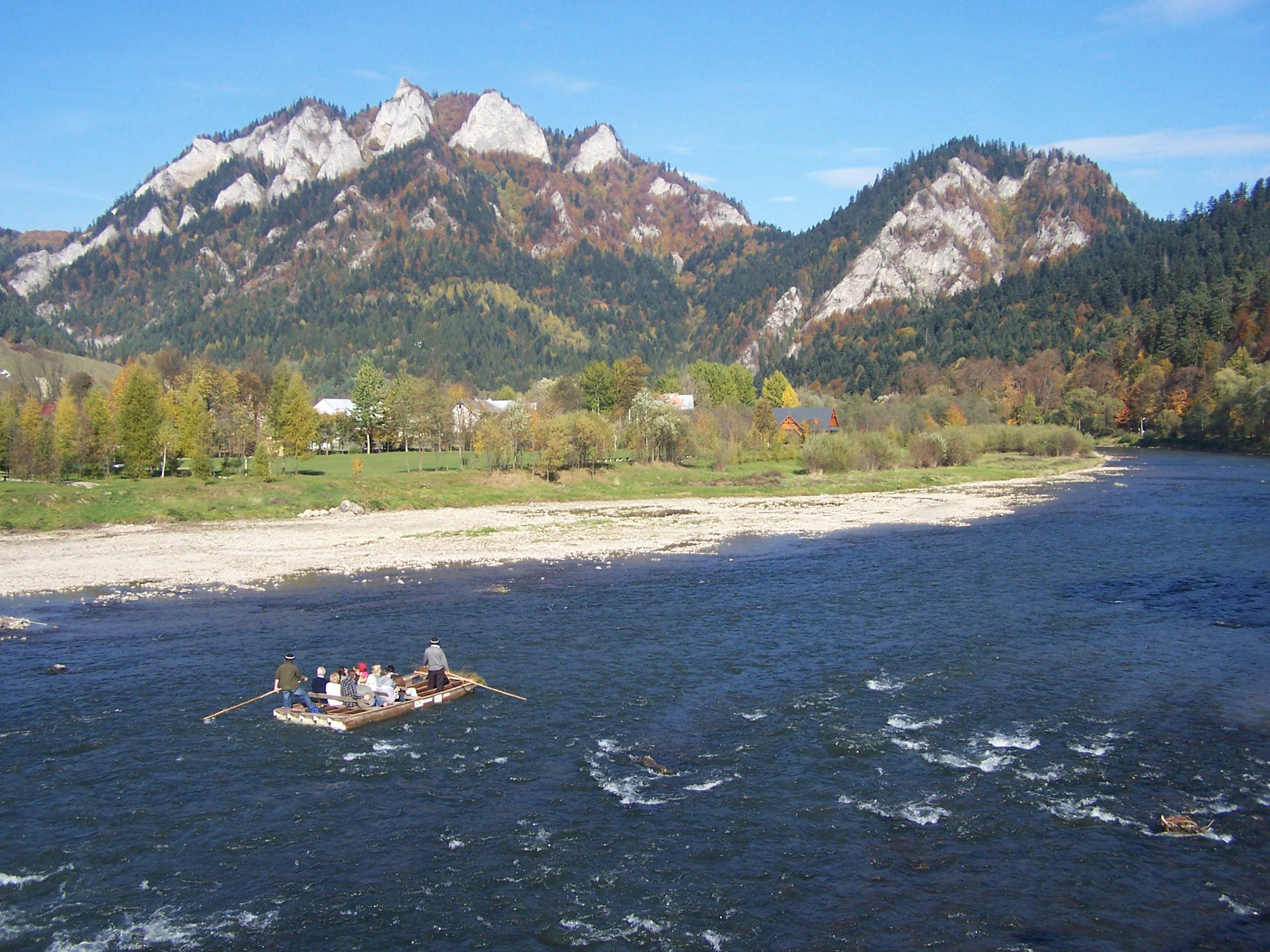
Rafting on the Dunajec toward the Trzy Korony massif visible in the background

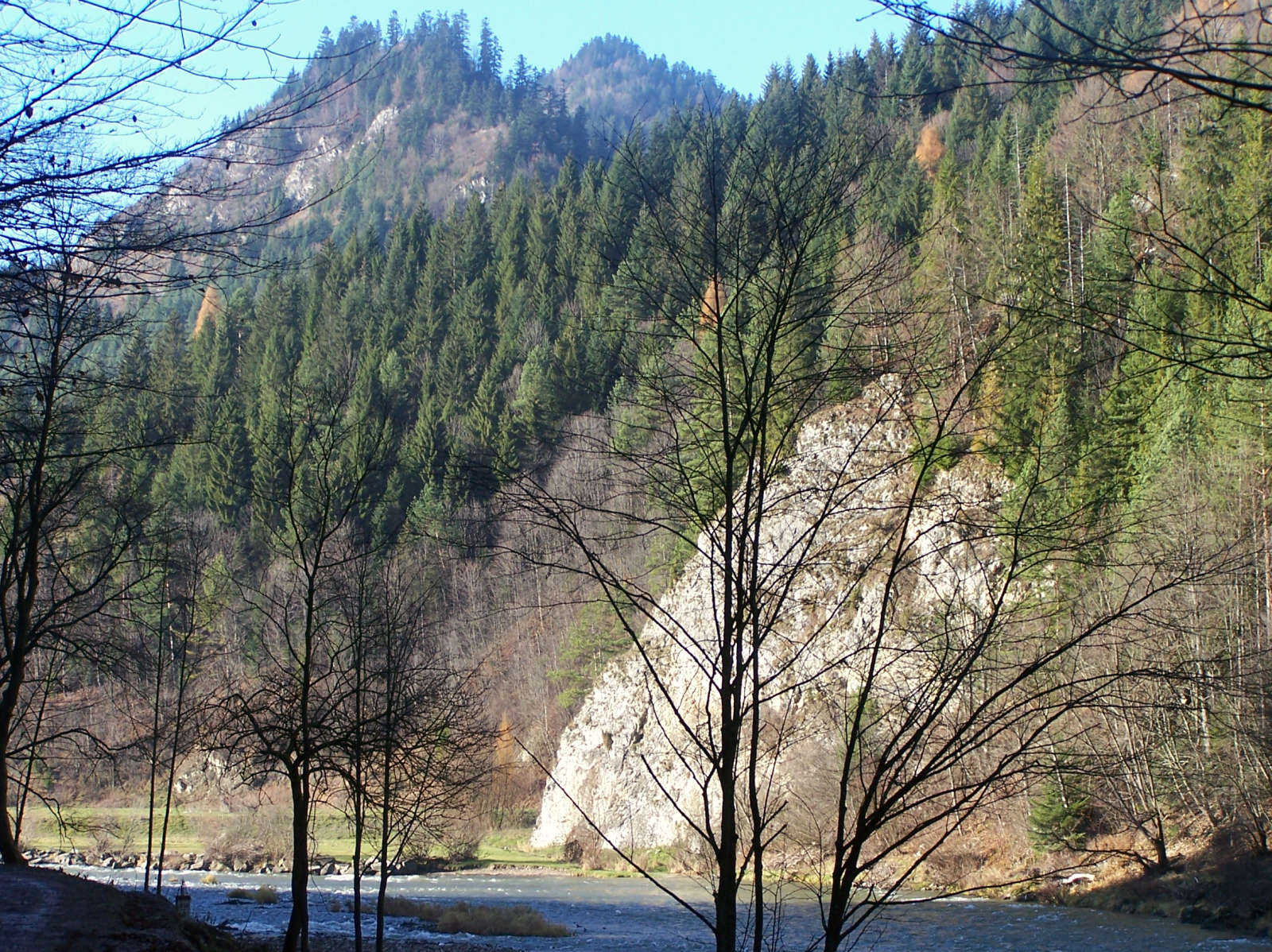
Ostra Skała (Sharp Peak) as seen from the tour

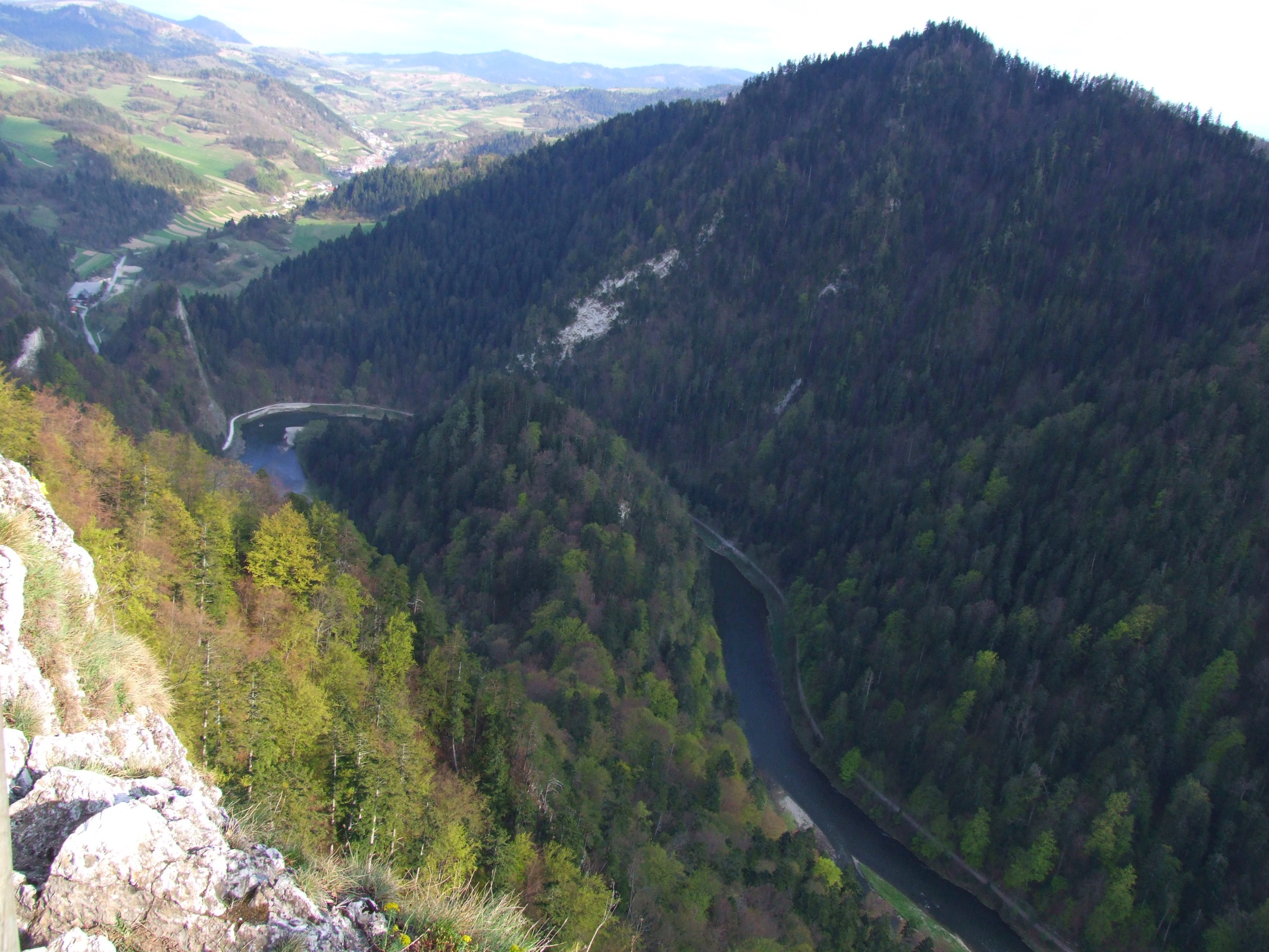
Dunajec River Gorge - View from Sokolica

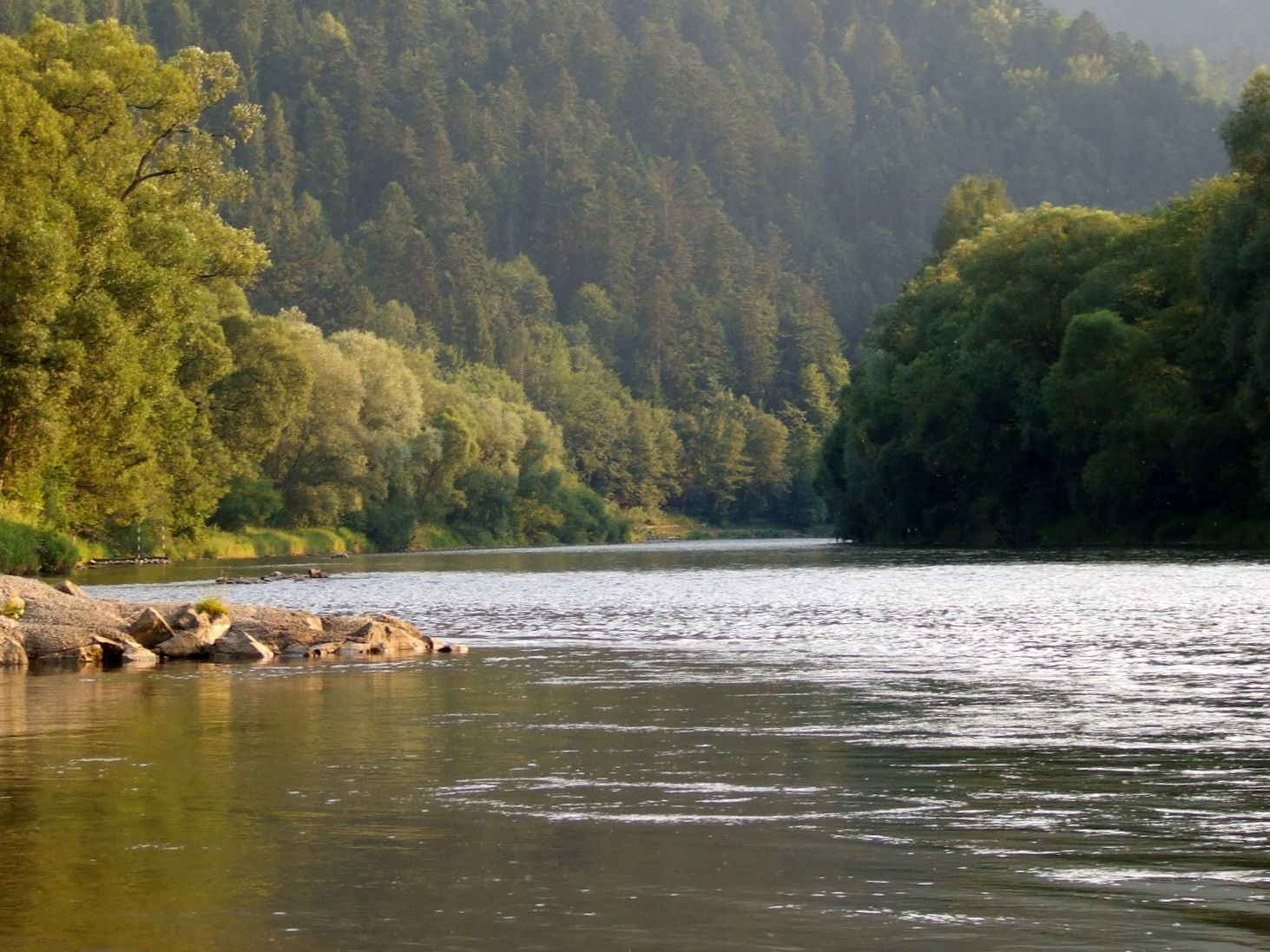
Exit from the Gorge near Szczawnica

== See also ==
- Dunajec River
- Trzy Korony (Three Crowns) massif
- Pieniny National Park (Poland)
- Niedzica Castle overlooking Czorsztyn Lake
- World Heritage Sites of Poland
- Tourism in Poland
- Dunajec river castles

Media related to Dunajec River Gorge at Wikimedia Commons
