= Czorsztyn Castle =

Polish castle

Coordinates: 49°26′N 20°18′E

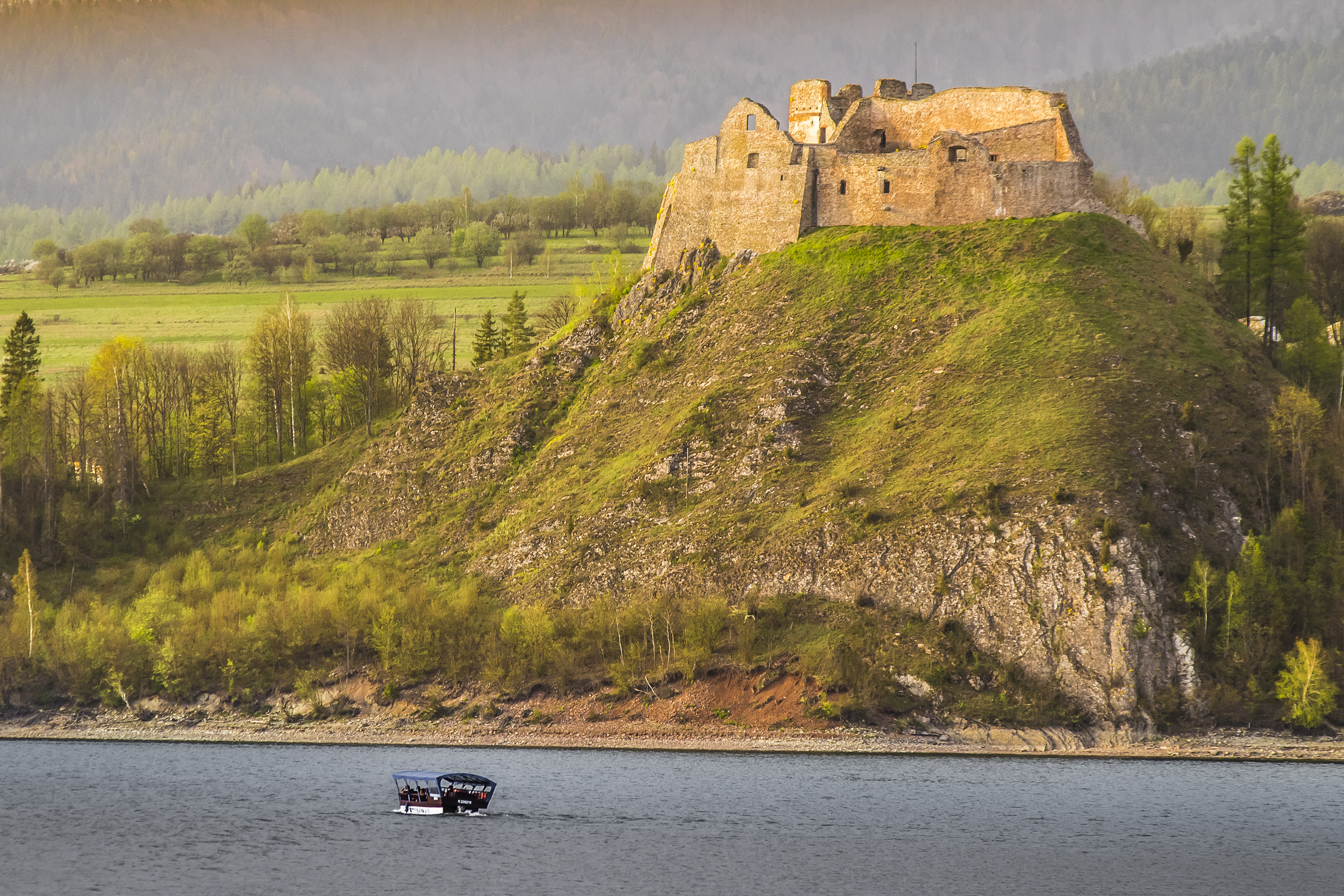
- Czorsztyn Castle ruins perched above the Dunajec River
- Interactive map of the Czorsztyn Castle area

General information
- Location: Czorsztyn, Poland
- Completed: 14th century
- Demolished: 1790

The ruins of Czorsztyn Castle (German: Sub-Arx Oberschloss, Arx Czorstein) are located in the southernmost part of Poland in Czorsztyn (Nowy Targ County in Lesser Poland), at Czorsztyn Lake within Pieniny National Park borders. On the other side of the Czorsztyn Lake is located Niedzica Castle.

== History ==
The Czorsztyn Castle stands at the top of the hill nearby Dunajec. According to Jan Długosz, in 1246 the owner of the castle was Piotr Wydżga. However that theory was never after confirmed by other historians, so the beginnings of castle functioning are dated on 14th century. Large development of the castle took place during the reign of Casimir III the Great. In years 1629–1643, when Jan Baranowski was a starosta of Czorsztyn, the castle was fundamentally rebuilt. In 1651 the Castle was captured by the Goral rebels of the Kostka Napierski Uprising. In 1790 the roof of the castle burned following a lightning strike. Afterwards, the castle was abandoned.

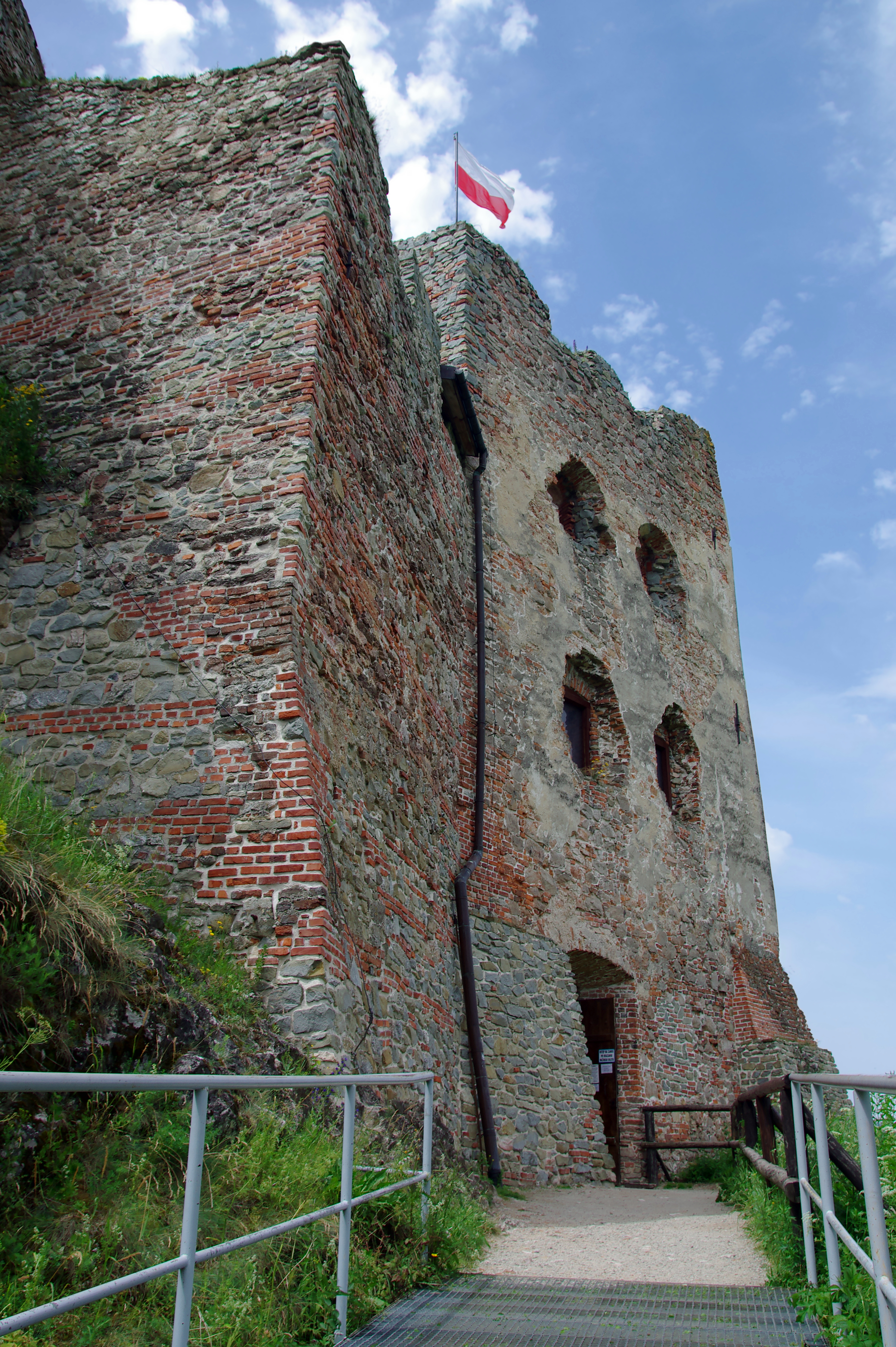
The Baranowski Tower

== See also ==
- Dunajec river castles
- Castles in Poland

== Bibliography ==
- Deptuła Czesław, Czorsztyn czyli Wronin. Studium z najstarszych dziejów osadnictwa na pograniczu polsko-węgierskim w rejonie Pienin, Lublin 1992.
- Michalczuk Stanisław, Zamek Czorsztyn – pomnik historii Polski, "Pieniny – Przyroda i Człowiek", 8/2003, ISSN 1230-4751.
- Stępień Piotr, Zamek Czorsztyn – zabytkowa ruina w parku narodowym, "Ochrona Zabytków", 1/2005, ISSN 0029-8247.
