= Kluszkowce =

- Village
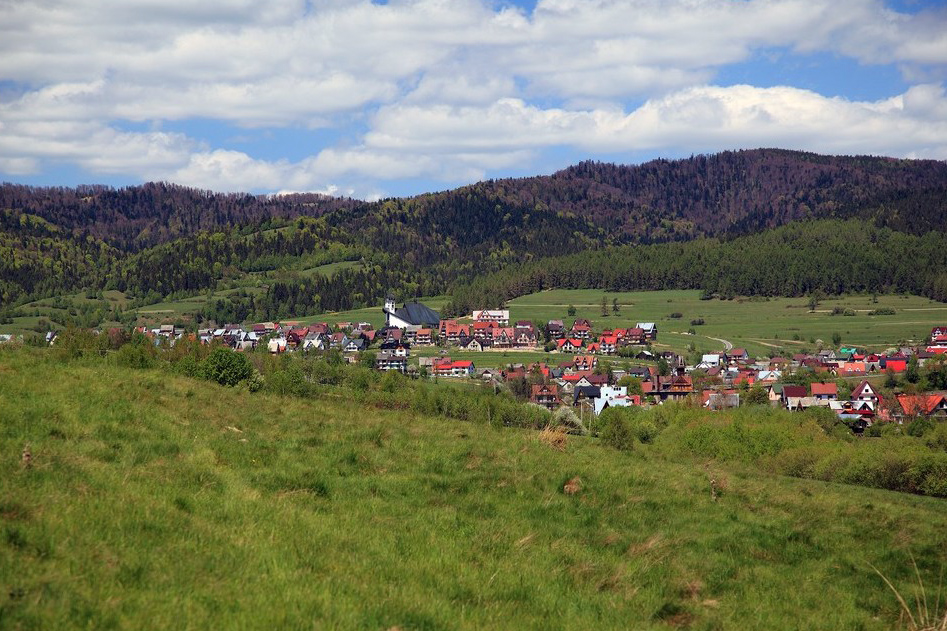
- General view of Kluszkowce

- Location within Poland
- Coordinates: 49°28′N 20°18′E
- Country: Poland
- Voivodeship: Lesser Poland
- County: Nowy Targ
- Gmina: Czorsztyn

Population
  - Total: 1,738

Kluszkowce [kluʂˈkɔft͡sɛ] is a village in the administrative district of Gmina Czorsztyn, within Nowy Targ County, Lesser Poland Voivodeship, in southern Poland, close to the border with Slovakia.
