= Kurów, Nowy Sącz County =

Kurów
- Village
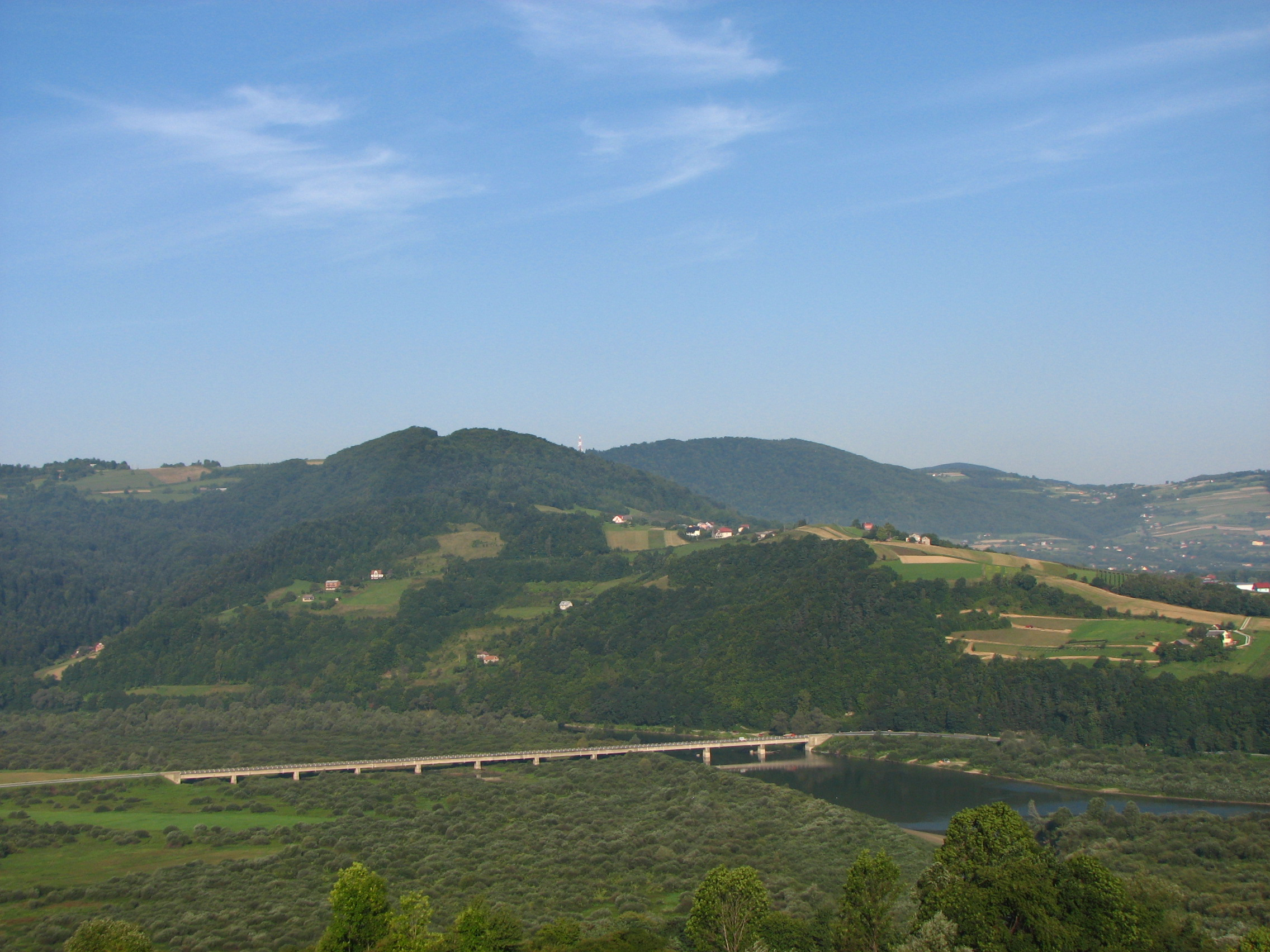

- Location within Poland
- Coordinates: 49°40′59″N 20°39′7″E
- Country: Poland
- Voivodeship: Lesser Poland
- County: Nowy Sącz
- Gmina: Chełmiec
- Population: 154

Kurów [ˈkuruf] is a village in the administrative district of Gmina Chełmiec, within Nowy Sącz County, Lesser Poland Voivodeship, in southern Poland.
