= Pieniny =

Mountain range in Central Europe

Pieniny Mountains
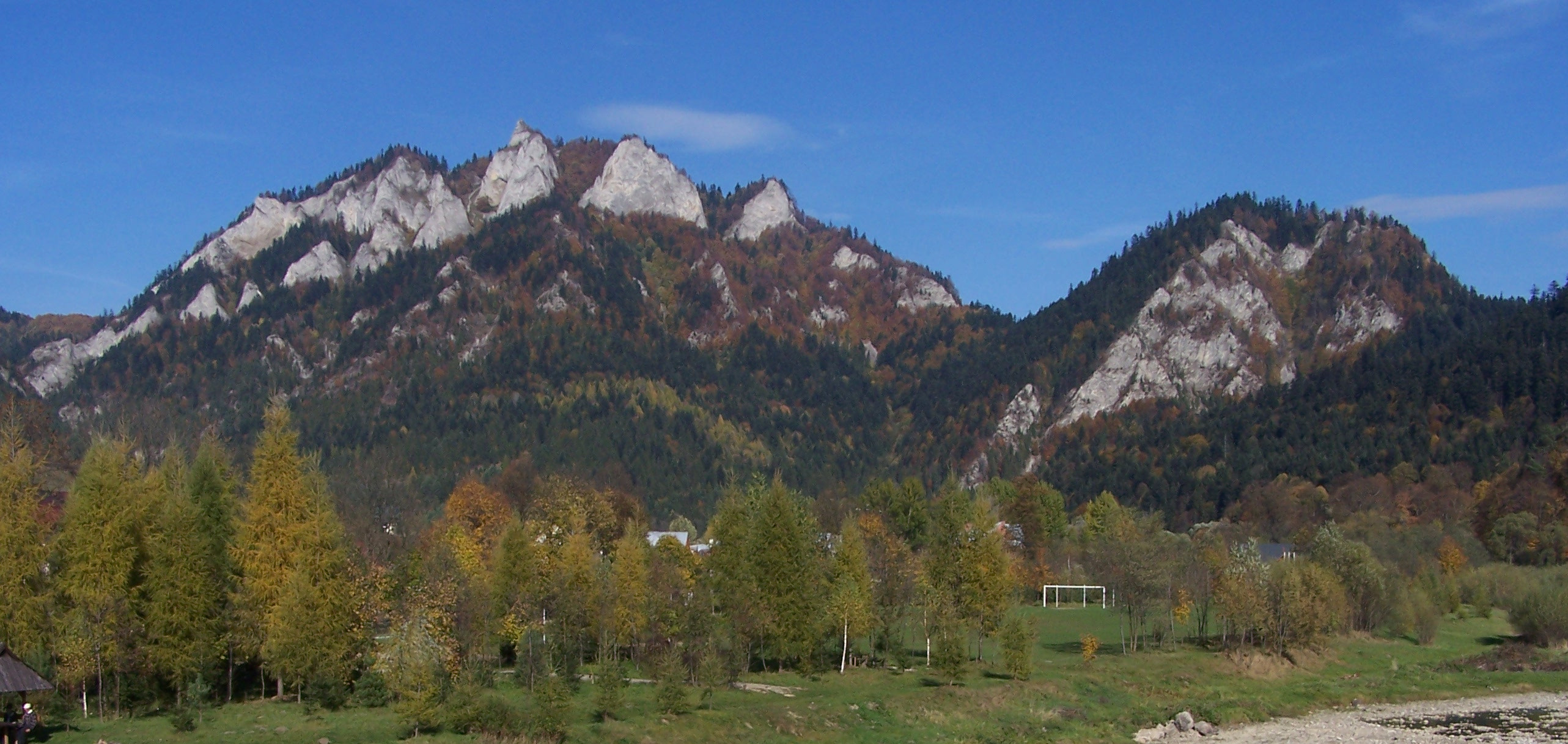
- View of Trzy Korony and Łysina Mountains

Highest point
- Peak: Wysoka
- Elevation: 1,050 m (3,440 ft)
- Coordinates: 49°22′49″N 20°33′20″E

Geography
- Location of the Pieniny Mountains, marked in red color and labeled as h3
- Countries: Poland; Slovakia
- Regions: Lesser Poland Voivodeship; Prešov Region
- Settlement(s): Krościenko nad Dunajcem, Szczawnica
- Parent range: Western Beskids
- Borders on: Western Carpathian range

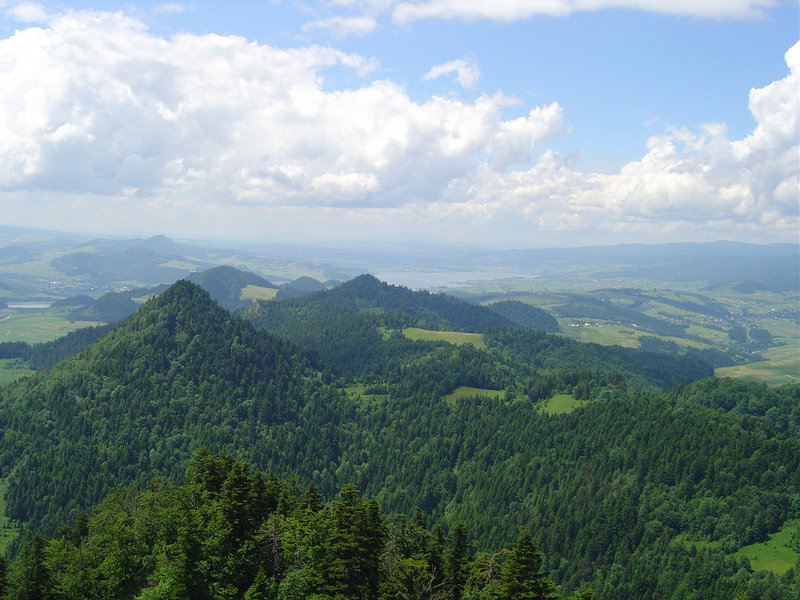
View of the nearby Pieniny from the summit of Three Crowns.

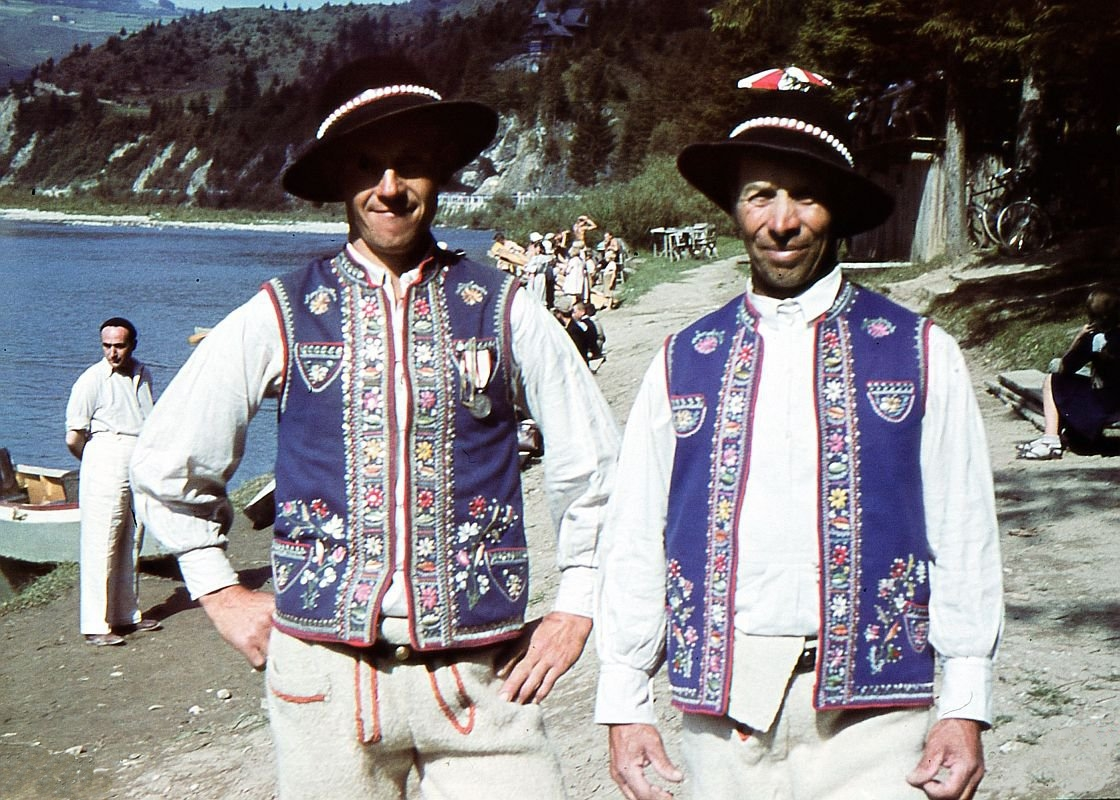
Szczawnica in Pieniny 1939

The Pieniny (sometimes also the Pienins or the Pienin Mountains, Hungarian: Pieninek) is a mountain range in the south of Poland and the north of Slovakia. It is classified within the eastern section of the Western Beskids.

The Pieniny mountain range is divided into three parts – Pieniny Spiskie (Slovak: Spišské Pieniny) and Pieniny Właściwe (Slovak: Centrálne Pieniny) in Poland; and, Małe Pieniny (English: Lesser or Little Pieniny; Slovak: Malé Pieniny) in Poland and Slovakia. The Pieniny mountains consist mainly of beds of limestone and dolomite. The most famous peak, Trzy Korony (Three Crowns), is 982 metres high. It is also the summit of the Three Crowns Massif. Pieniny's highest peak – Wysoka (Polish); Vysoké Skalky (Slovak) – reaches 1,050 metres above sea level.

Pieniny mountains formed at the bottom of the sea in several geological epochs. They were folded and raised in Upper Cretaceous. At the beginning of the Paleogene geologic period a second wave of tectonic movements took place causing a further shift. The third wave of movements during the Paleogene and Neogene resulted in a more complex tectonic structure. At the same time erosion resulted in stripping of the outer mantle rocks and further modeling of terrain. Peaks were built from weather resistant Jurassic rocks, mainly limestone. Valleys and passes were created from softer and more susceptible to weathering rocks of Cretaceous and Paleogene periods. Caves are few and rather small. By contrast, rivers and streams are often deeply indented in the rock, creating approximately 15 ravines and gorges. The most famous gorges of the Pieniny mountains are the Dunajec River Gorge in Pieniny National Park and the Homole Ravine (Polish: Wąwóz Homole). Hills along the northern border of Pieniny are of volcanic origin.

== Image gallery ==
Pieniny skyline

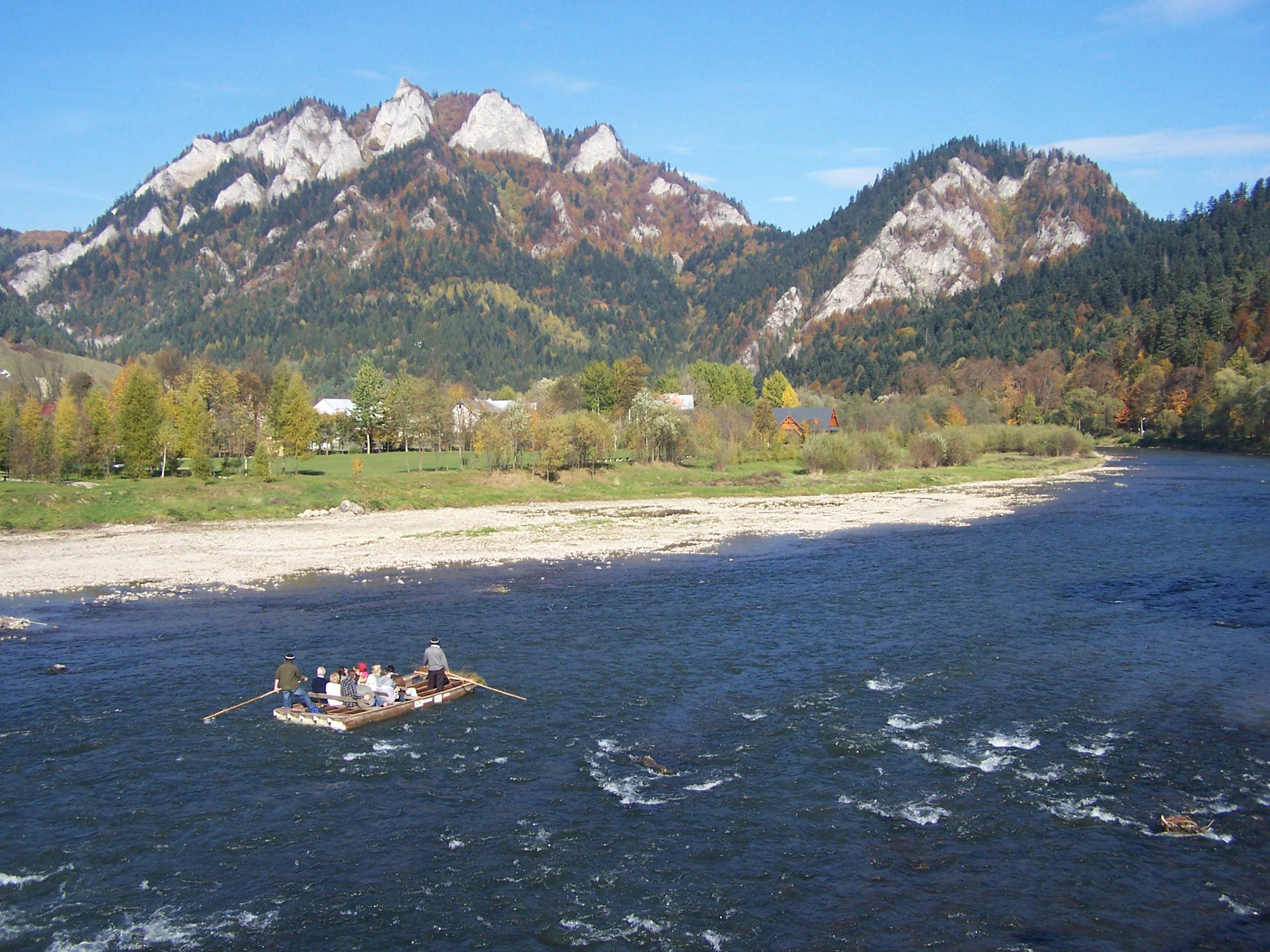
Trzy Korony and Facimiech Mountain

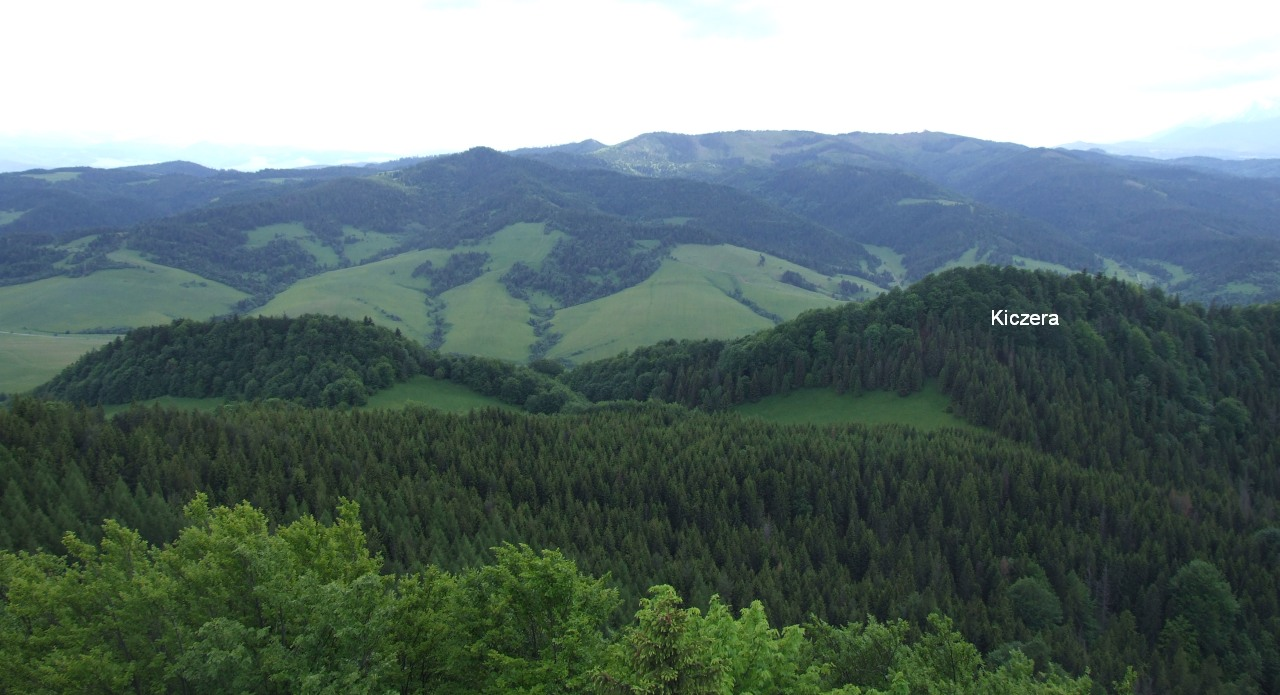
Kiczera and Magura Spiska. View from Wysokie Skały

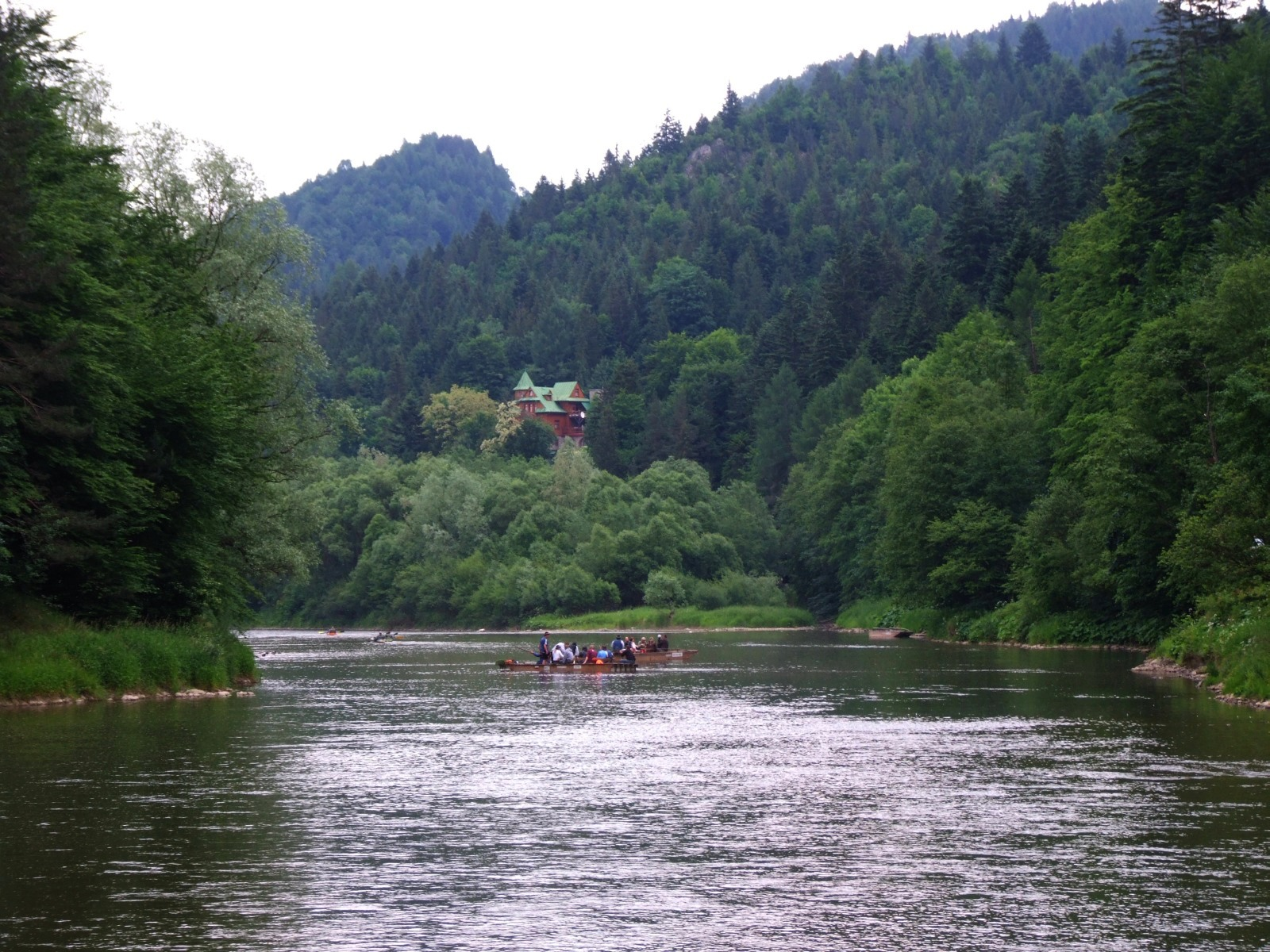
Dunajec River

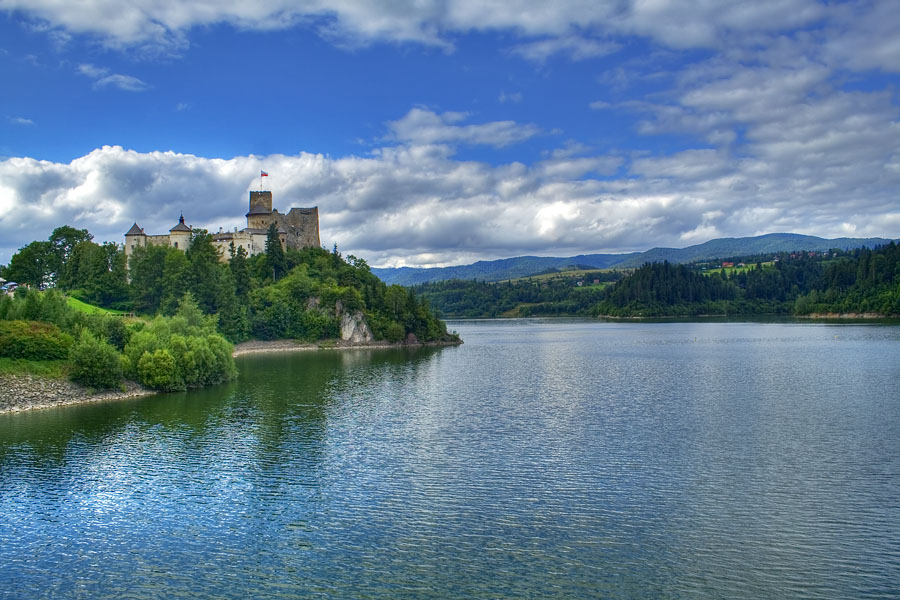
Niedzica Castle and Czorsztyn Lake

== See also ==
- Pieniny National Park (Poland)
- Pieniny National Park (Slovakia)
- Dunajec River Gorge
- Mikołaj Zyblikiewicz
- Tourism in Poland
