= Pieniny National Park (Poland) =

National park of Poland

- Polish: Pieniński Park Narodowy
- IUCN category II (national park)
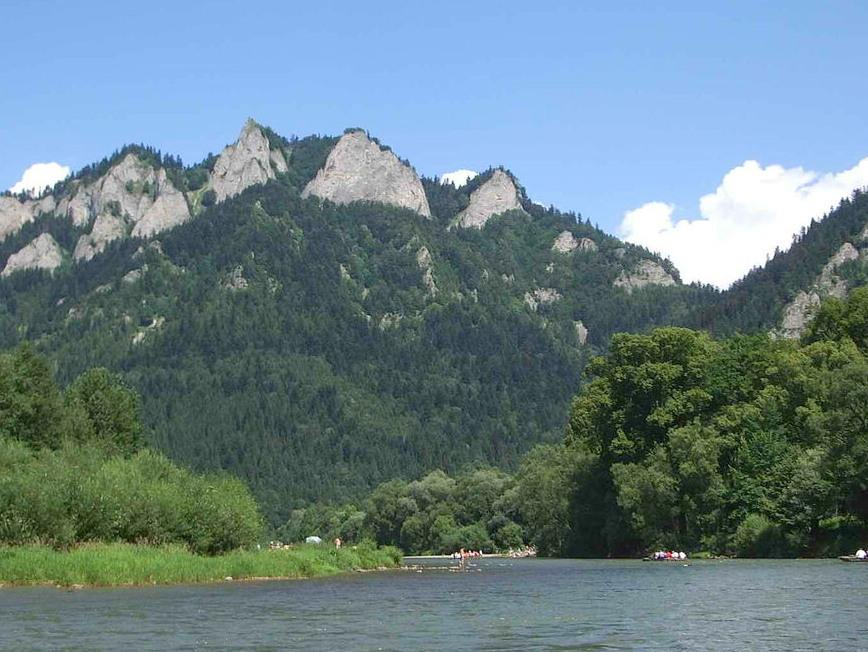
- View of Trzy Korony Massif from Dunajec River Park logo with stylized Trzy Korony Massif

- Location within Poland
- Location: Lesser Poland Voivodeship, Poland
- Nearest city: Szczawnica
- Coordinates: 49°25′N 20°22′E
- Area: 23.46 km^{2} (9.06 sq mi)
- Established: 1932
- Governing body: Ministry of the Environment
- Website: Official website

Pieniny National Park (Polish: Pieniński Park Narodowy) is a protected area located in the heart of the Pieniny Mountains in the southernmost part of Poland. It is the oldest national park in Poland. Administratively, the park lies in the Lesser Poland Voivodeship on the border with Slovakia. Its head office is in Krościenko nad Dunajcem.

The Pieniny mountain chain is divided into three ranges: Pieniny Spiskie, Małe Pieniny, and the Pieniny Właściwe range where the Park is located. The park's area is 23.46 square kilometres (9.06 sq mi), of which 13.11 km^{2} is forested. One-third (7.5 km^{2}) is strictly protected. On the Slovak side of the mountains there is a parallel park called the Pieninský národný park.

== History ==
The idea for the creation of the National Park in Pieniny came from Prof. Władysław Szafer, a member of the National Commission for the Preservation of Nature (Polish: Państwowa Komisja Ochrony Przyrody) in 1921. The same year, a private preserve on the area of 75,000 m^{2} was opened by Stanisław Drohojowski around the ruins of the Czorsztyn castle. In 1928, the Polish government made its first land purchases and on May 23, 1932, the Ministry of Agriculture created a "National Park in the Pieniny", with an area of 7.36 km^{2}. After World War II, the decision was confirmed by an October 30, 1954 act of the government, which officially created Pieniny National Park.

== Features ==
The Pieniny Mountains consist mostly of limestone. The mountains have picturesque, almost vertical cliffs which go down to the Dunajec River. The most famous summit - Trzy Korony (Three Crowns) is 982 meters above sea level high, however Pieniny's highest mountain - Wysokie Skałki - is 1050 meters above sea level and is not located in the national park.

Pieniny National Park is located in the Dunajec river basin, and the river occupies an important position among factors that influence Pieniny's look. Even though the park is small in size, within its area thrive hundreds of species of plants, including 640 kinds of mushrooms. Sometimes, on the same rock, grow plants with opposite means of survival. The park's meadows, which are the result of human activity, are some of the richest plant ecosystems of Poland (30 to 40 species of flowers for every square meter).

So far around 6500 animal species are known to live in the Pieniny. It is believed that the area is even more abundant - with up to 15 000 species. There are numerous birds, fish, reptiles and amphibians as well as mammals. The most important predator is the lynx. On the shores of the Dunajec the otter thrives.

The first permanent human settlements in the Pieniny Mountains date back to 1257, when Polish princess Kinga was given nearby lands. In 1280, the princess founded a monastery at Stary Sącz, later the Czorsztyn castle was built. This castle belonged to Poland, on the southern side of the Dunajec valley, the Hungarians built their own, then called Dunajec (today it belongs to Poland and its name is Niedzica). In 1997, the Dunajec valley was flooded as a result of construction of a river dam.

There are many hiking trails in the park, from such peaks as Sokolica and Trzy Korony one can have excellent view on the Pieniny and the Tatra Mountains as well as the Dunajec. The Park's main attraction is a river trip on wooden rafts, very popular among all tourists.

== See also ==
- Polish National Parks
- Dunajec River Gorge
- Dunajec river castles
