= Kremna (disambiguation) =

Kremna may refer to:

- Kremna, a village in Užice Municipality, Serbia
- Kremna (Prnjavor), a village in Prnjavor Municipality, Republika Srpska, Bosnia and Herzegovina
- Kremna, an ancient Roman city in Pisidia, south western Turkey.

== See also ==
- Kremná, is a village and municipality in Stará Ľubovňa District, Slovakia
