= Legnava =

- Municipality
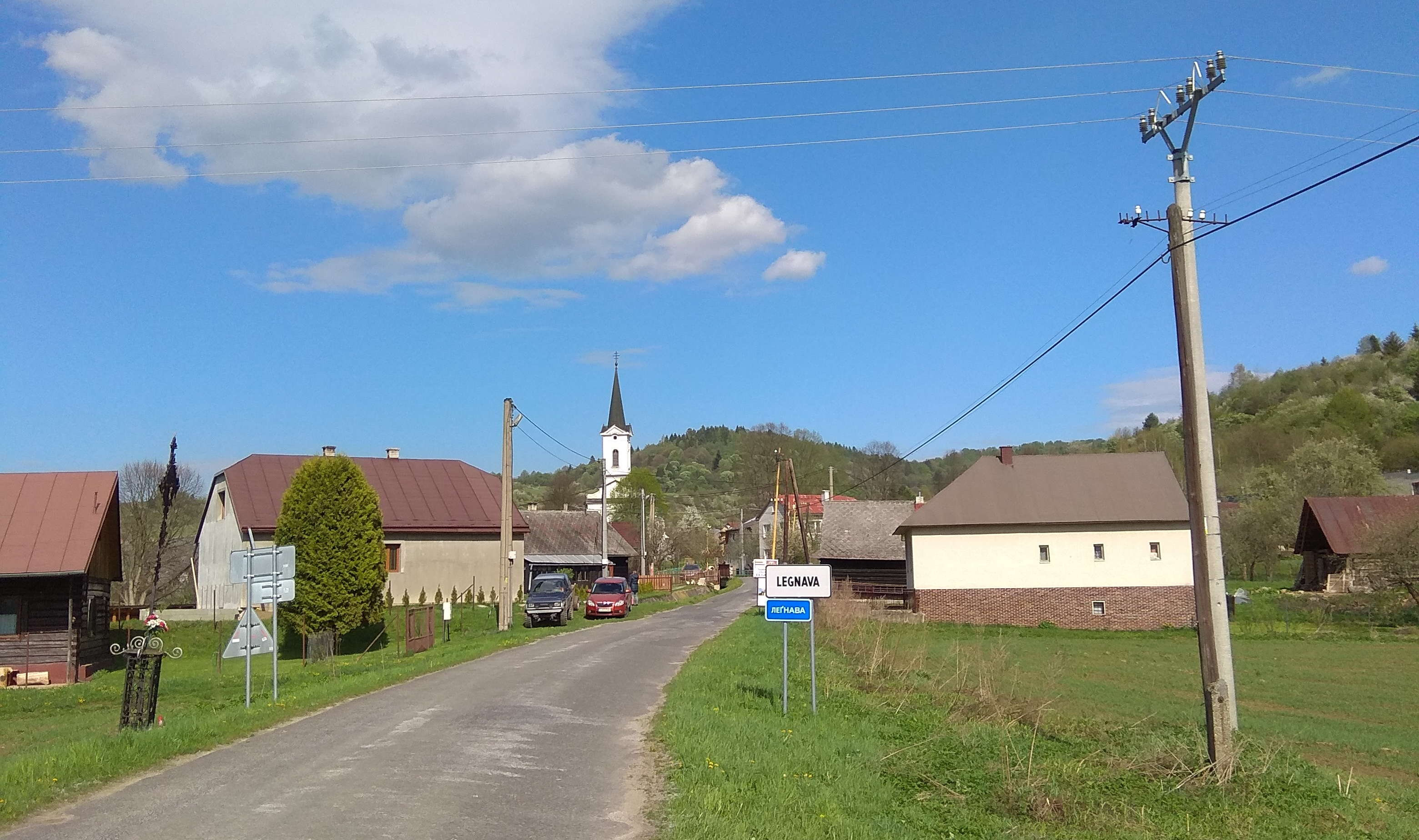

- Flag

- Location of Legnava in the Prešov Region Location of Legnava in Slovakia
- Coordinates: 49.33°N 20.85°E
- Country: Slovakia
- Region: Prešov Region
- District: Stará Ľubovňa District
- First mentioned: 1427

Area
  - Total: 8.62 km^{2} (3.33 sq mi)
- Elevation: 449 m (1,473 ft)

Population (2025)
  - Total: 83
- Time zone: UTC+1 (CET)
  - Summer (DST): UTC+2 (CEST)
- Postal code: 654 6
- Area code: +421 52
- Vehicle registration plate (until 2022): SL
- Website: legnava.sk

Legnava (Hungarian: Hosszúvágás, German: Langenau, Rusyn: Леґнава) is a village and municipality in the Stará Ľubovňa District, Prešov Region in northern Slovakia. It has 146 inhabitants.

== Geography ==
The municipality lies at an altitude of 449 metres (1,473 ft) and covers an area of 8.62 km^{2} (3.33 sq mi) (2025).

== History ==
=== Early history ===
The village was founded after 1366, when the then Hungarian king Louis I gave a nobleman Jakub a forested area near the villages of Starina, Orlov, near the Poprad river, to create a village.

=== Legnava under Hungarian Rule ===
In the past, the village had tax ports that belonged to the Brežnovica family. In the documents from the 15th and 16th centuries, the tax ports are mentioned sporadically under the name, "Langno", the Hungarian variant of the name, other name included, Lagnó and Hosszúvágás. As well as German names such as Legenau and Langhaw. Documents from 1440 show that the village was named, "Valasi".

In 1600, the village consisted of 16 serf houses. At the end of the 16th century, Legnava was a medium-sized municipality with exclusively serf population mostly of Rusyn origin. In the 17th century, most land around the village belonged to the Semsey family. The land was later given to the Szirmay family in the 18th century. A chapel built by Tomáš Szirmay (1760) is located 1 km from the village.

By the end of the 19th century, the village had 503 inhabitants, the highest number recorded in the village's history. At that time, the inhabitants made their living mainly by hard labour, such as farming and construction.

Before the establishment of independent Czechoslovakia in 1918, Legnava was part of Sáros County within the Kingdom of Hungary. From 1939 to 1945, it was part of the Slovak Republic. On 24 January 1945, the Red Army dislodged the Wehrmacht from Legnava and it was once again part of Czechoslovakia.

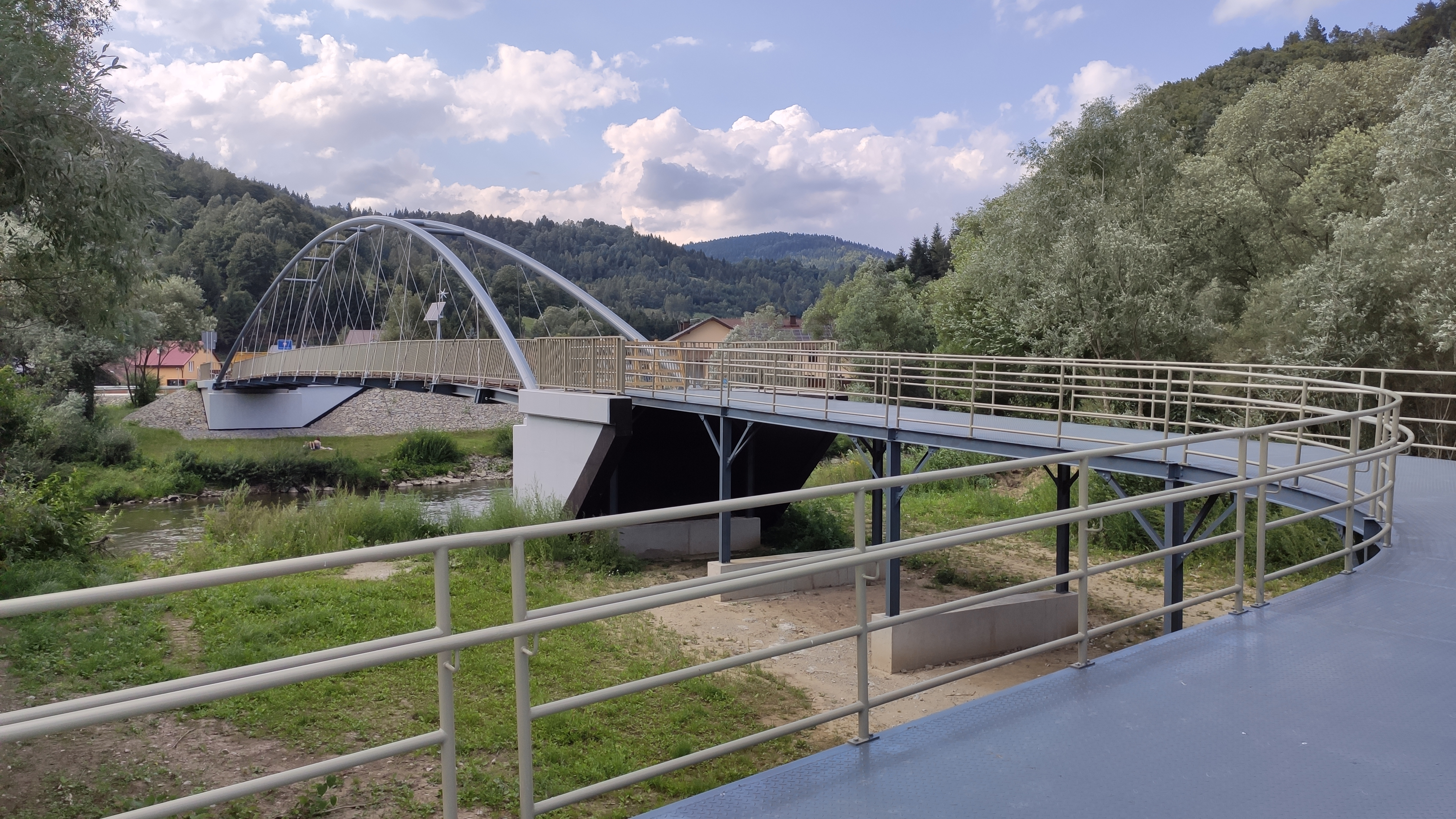
Legnava - border bridge (walk/cyclo) to village Milik in Poland

== Population ==
Population statistic (10 years)
Year	1995	2005	2015	2025
Count	184	138	114	83
Difference		−25%	−17.39%	−27.19%

Population statistic
Year	2024	2025
Count	87	83
Difference		−4.59%

It has a population of 83 people (31 December 2025).

=== Ethnicity ===
Census 2021 (1+ %)
Ethnicity	Number	Fraction
Slovak	82	87.23%
Rusyn	18	19.14%
Not found out	4	4.25%
Romani	3	3.19%
Czech	1	1.06%
Hungarian	1	1.06%
Total	94	

In year 2021 was 94 people by ethnicity 82 as Slovak, 18 as Rusyn, 4 as Not found out, 3 as Romani, 1 as Czech and 1 as Hungarian.

Note on population: The difference values of population numbers in the table "Population statistic" and in the sections "Ethnicity" & "Religion" is caused by the use of various statistical methods.

=== Religion ===
Census 2021 (1+ %)
Religion	Number	Fraction
Greek Catholic Church	40	42.55%
Roman Catholic Church	29	30.85%
None	21	22.34%
Not found out	4	4.26%
Total	94	

In year 2021 was 94 people by religion 40 from Greek Catholic Church, 29 from Roman Catholic Church, 21 from None and 4 from Not found out.
