= Veľká Lesná =

Municipality of Slovakia

- Municipality
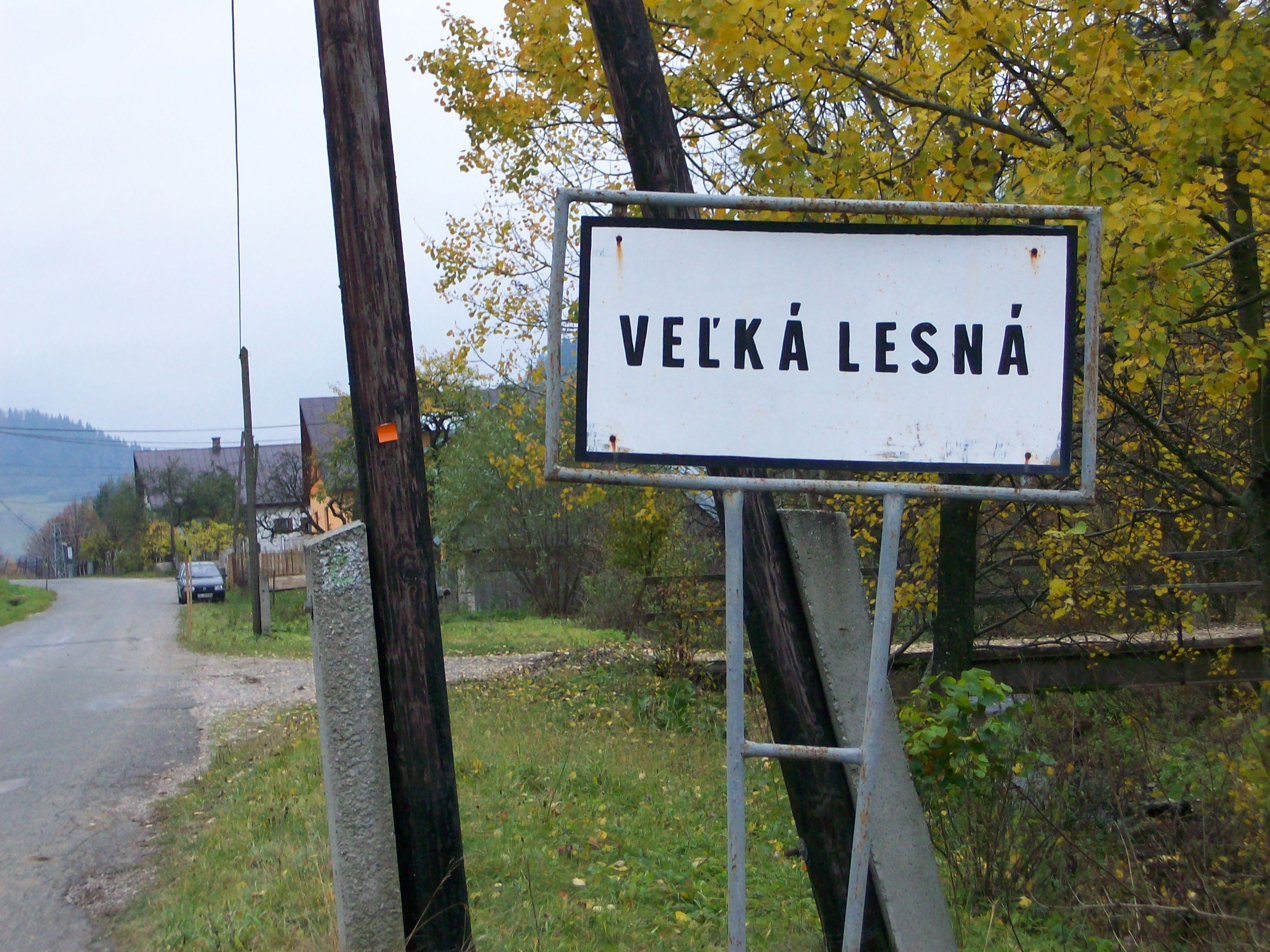

- Flag

- Location of Veľká Lesná in the Prešov Region Location of Veľká Lesná in Slovakia
- Coordinates: 49.33°N 20.45°E
- Country: Slovakia
- Region: Prešov Region
- District: Stará Ľubovňa District
- First mentioned: 1338

Area
  - Total: 24.27 km^{2} (9.37 sq mi)
- Elevation: 603 m (1,978 ft)

Population (2025)
  - Total: 499
- Time zone: UTC+1 (CET)
  - Summer (DST): UTC+2 (CEST)
- Postal code: 653 4
- Area code: +421 52
- Vehicle registration plate (until 2022): SL
- Website: www.velkalesna.sk

Veľká Lesná, formerly Richvald (German: Reichwald; Goral: Ryvold; Hungarian: Kristályfalu, Rusyn: Велика Лїсна) a village and municipality in Stará Ľubovňa District in the Prešov Region of northern Slovakia.

== History ==
In historical records the village was first mentioned in 1338. Before the dissolution of Austria-Hungary, the town was listed as Richvald. Before the establishment of independent Czechoslovakia in 1918, Veľká Lesná was part of Szepes County within the Kingdom of Hungary. From 1939 to 1945, it was part of the Slovak Republic. On 27 January 1945, the Red Army dislodged the Wehrmacht from Veľká Lesná and it was once again part of Czechoslovakia.

== Geography ==
The municipality lies at an altitude of 603 metres (1,978 ft) and covers an area of 24.27 km^{2} (9.37 sq mi) (2025).

== Population ==
Population statistic (10 years)
Year	1995	2005	2015	2025
Count	423	498	477	499
Difference		+17.73%	−4.21%	+4.61%

Population statistic
Year	2024	2025
Count	498	499
Difference		+0.20%

It has a population of 499 people (31 December 2025).

=== Ethnicity ===
Census 2021 (1+ %)
Ethnicity	Number	Fraction
Slovak	485	96.61%
Not found out	104	20.71%
Total	502	

In year 2021 was 502 people by ethnicity 485 as Slovak, 104 as Not found out, 4 as Czech, 3 as Rusyn, 3 as Polish, 2 as Other, 1 as German and 1 as Hungarian.

Note on population: The difference values of population numbers in the table "Population statistic" and in the sections "Ethnicity" & "Religion" is caused by the use of various statistical methods.

=== Religion ===
Census 2021 (1+ %)
Religion	Number	Fraction
Roman Catholic Church	464	92.43%
Not found out	15	2.99%
None	12	2.39%
Greek Catholic Church	9	1.79%
Total	502	

In year 2021 was 502 people by religion 464 from Roman Catholic Church, 15 from Not found out, 12 from None, 9 from Greek Catholic Church, 1 from Other and not ascertained christian church and 1 from Other.
