= Matysová =

- Municipality
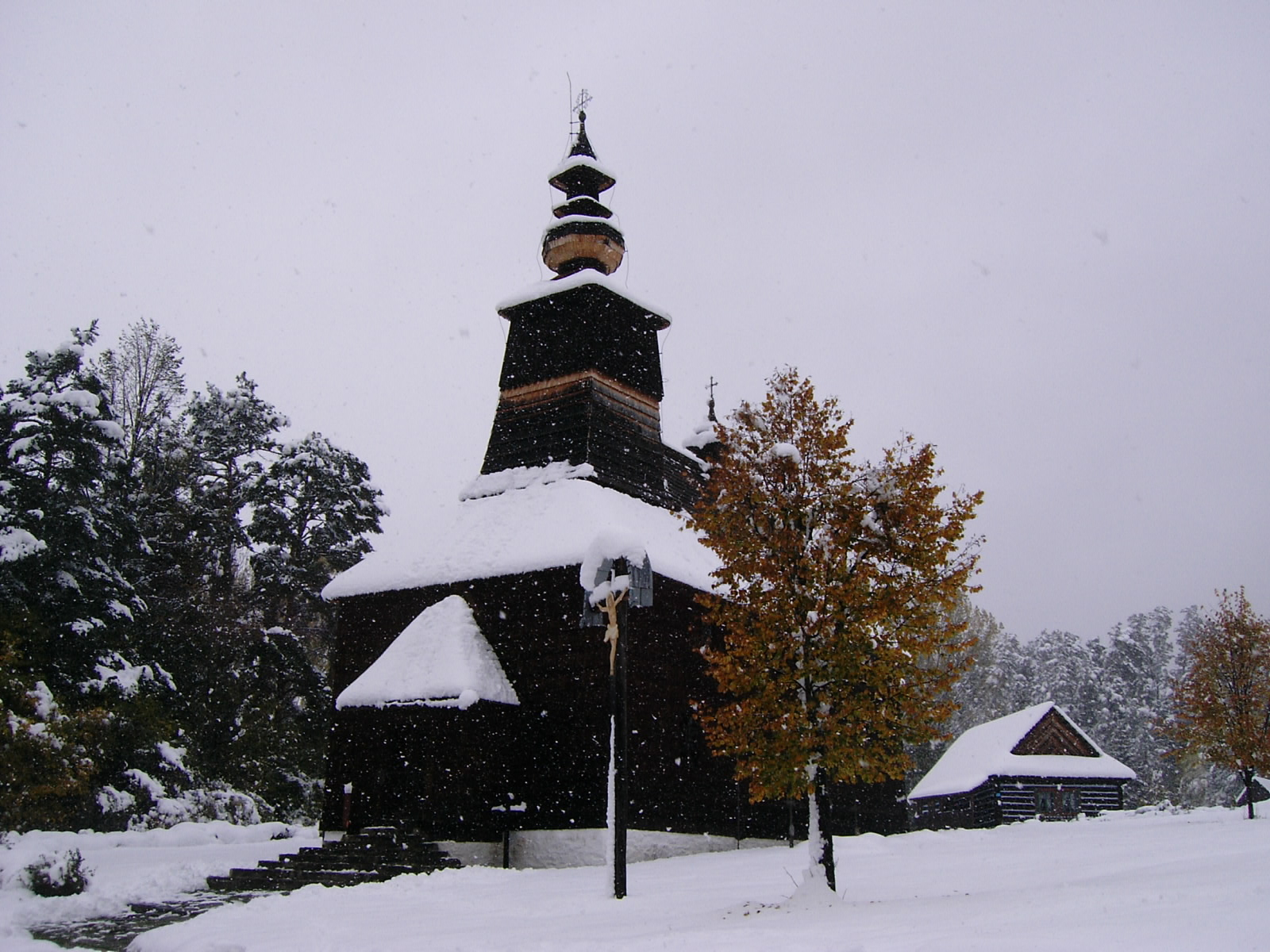

- Flag

- Location of Matysová in the Prešov Region Location of Matysová in Slovakia
- Coordinates: 49.32°N 20.77°E
- Country: Slovakia
- Region: Prešov Region
- District: Stará Ľubovňa District
- First mentioned: 1408

Area
  - Total: 10.43 km^{2} (4.03 sq mi)
- Elevation: 597 m (1,959 ft)

Population (2025)
  - Total: 55
- Time zone: UTC+1 (CET)
  - Summer (DST): UTC+2 (CEST)
- Postal code: 654 6
- Area code: +421 52
- Vehicle registration plate (until 2022): SL
- Website: matysova.sk

Matysová (Rusyn: Матисова, romanized: Matysova; Hungarian: Máté) is a village and municipality in Stará Ľubovňa District in the Prešov Region of northern Slovakia.

== History ==
In historical records the village was first mentioned in 1408. Before the establishment of independent Czechoslovakia in 1918, Matysová was part of Sáros County within the Kingdom of Hungary. From 1939 to 1945, it was part of the Slovak Republic. On 24 January 1945, the Red Army dislodged the Wehrmacht from Matysová and it was once again part of Czechoslovakia.

== Geography ==
The municipality lies at an altitude of 597 metres (1,959 ft) and covers an area of 10.43 km^{2} (4.03 sq mi) (2025).

== Population ==
Population statistic (10 years)
Year	1995	2005	2015	2025
Count	111	76	73	55
Difference		−31.53%	−3.94%	−24.65%

Population statistic
Year	2024	2025
Count	55	55
Difference		−1.42%

It has a population of 55 people (31 December 2025).

=== Ethnicity ===
Census 2021 (1+ %)
Ethnicity	Number	Fraction
Slovak	45	80.35%
Rusyn	19	33.92%
Not found out	2	3.57%
Total	56	

In year 2021 was 56 people by ethnicity 45 as Slovak, 19 as Rusyn and 2 as Not found out.

Note on population: The difference values of population numbers in the table "Population statistic" and in the sections "Ethnicity" & "Religion" is caused by the use of various statistical methods.

=== Religion ===
Census 2021 (1+ %)
Religion	Number	Fraction
Greek Catholic Church	43	76.79%
None	9	16.07%
Roman Catholic Church	2	3.57%
Eastern Orthodox Church	1	1.79%
Not found out	1	1.79%
Total	56	

In year 2021 was 56 people by religion 43 from Greek Catholic Church, 9 from None, 2 from Roman Catholic Church, 1 from Eastern Orthodox Church and 1 from Not found out.
