= Stará Ľubovňa District =

Coordinates: 49°18′8″N 20°41′26″E

- District
- Country: Slovakia
- Region (kraj): Prešov Region
- Seat: Stará Ľubovňa

Area
  - Total: 707.85 km^{2} (273.30 sq mi)

Population (2025)
  - Total: 53,435
- Time zone: UTC+1 (CET)
  - Summer (DST): UTC+2 (CEST)
- Telephone prefix: 052
- Vehicle registration plate (until 2022): SL
- Municipalities: 44

Stará Ľubovňa District (Slovak: okres Stará Ľubovňa) is a district in the Prešov Region of eastern Slovakia. Until 1918, the district was almost entirely part of the county of Kingdom of Hungary of Spiš, apart from a small area in the east which formed part of the county of Šariš.

== Population ==
Population statistic (10 years)
Year	1995	2005	2015	2025
Count	49,004	51,539	53,471	53,435
Difference		+5.17%	+3.74%	−0.06%

Population statistic
Year	2024	2025
Count	53,392	53,435
Difference		+0.08%

It has a population of 53,435 people (31 December 2025).

Historical population
Year	Pop.	±%
1970	39,010	—
1980	42,200	+8.2%
1991	46,513	+10.2%
2001	50,684	+9.0%
2011	52,866	+4.3%
2021	52,968	+0.2%
Source: Statistical Office of the Slovak Republic

=== Ethnicity ===
Census 2021 (1+ %)
Ethnicity	Number	Fraction
Slovak	46,788	71.59%
Rusyn	7358	11.25%
Romani	5388	8.24%
Not found out	4514	6.9%
Total	65,347	

In year 2021 was 65,347 people by ethnicity 46,788 as Slovak, 7358 as Rusyn, 5388 as Romani, 4514 as Not found out, 385 as German, 239 as Ukrainian, 186 as Czech, 182 as Polish, 131 as Other, 44 as Russian, 41 as Hungarian, 17 as English, 11 as Moravian, 10 as Irish, 9 as Italian, 8 as Vietnamese, 6 as Romanian, 5 as Serbian, 5 as Austrian, 5 as Croatian, 4 as Jewish, 4 as Turkish, 2 as Chinese, 2 as Greek, 1 as Canadian, 1 as French and 1 as Albanian.

Note on population: The difference values of population numbers in the table "Population statistic" and in the sections "Ethnicity" & "Religion" is caused by the use of various statistical methods.

=== Religion ===
Census 2021 (1+ %)
Religion	Number	Fraction
Roman Catholic Church	30,648	57.86%
Greek Catholic Church	15,566	29.39%
Not found out	2712	5.12%
None	2612	4.93%
Eastern Orthodox Church	792	1.5%
Total	52,968	

In year 2021 was 52,968 people by religion 30,648 from Roman Catholic Church, 15,566 from Greek Catholic Church, 2712 from Not found out, 2612 from None, 792 from Eastern Orthodox Church, 194 from Evangelical Church, 79 from Ad hoc movements, 76 from Other and not ascertained christian church, 53 from Christian Congregations in Slovakia, 51 from Other, 47 from Jehovah's Witnesses, 25 from Calvinist Church, 24 from Apostolic Church, 21 from Buddhism, 20 from Paganism and natural spirituality, 17 from United Methodist Church, 11 from Old Catholic Church, 6 from Islam, 4 from Jewish community, 3 from Hinduism, 3 from Seventh-day Adventist Church, 3 from Baptists Church and 1 from Czechoslovak Hussite Church.

== Municipalities ==
Municipality	Area [km^{2}]	Population
Čirč	20.18	1,445
Ďurková	3.97	219
Forbasy	4.44	450
Hajtovka	3.04	83
Haligovce	11.28	655
Hniezdne	18.06	1,393
Hraničné	7.56	177
Hromoš	13.35	512
Chmeľnica	12.64	1,002
Jakubany	16.78	2,927
Jarabina	22.88	930
Kamienka	29.17	1,335
Kolačkov	8.67	1,282
Kremná	4.14	99
Kyjov	15.65	751
Lacková	6.16	160
Legnava	8.62	83
Lesnica	14.57	490
Litmanová	17.90	605
Lomnička	9.56	3,839
Ľubotín	10.86	1,300
Malý Lipník	13.74	490
Matysová	10.43	55
Mníšek nad Popradom	17.93	589
Nižné Ružbachy	9.79	618
Nová Ľubovňa	14.49	3,009
Obručné	5.86	33
Orlov	20.76	599
Plaveč	16.68	1,773
Plavnica	19.60	1,651
Podolínec	33.18	3,024
Pusté Pole	3.23	233
Ruská Voľa nad Popradom	6.02	79
Stará Ľubovňa	30.78	15,534
Starina	9.15	50
Stráňany	11.60	187
Sulín	20.16	283
Šambron	12.91	361
Šarišské Jastrabie	21.37	1,638
Údol	13.07	374
Veľká Lesná	24.27	499
Veľký Lipník	27.51	903
Vislanka	4.24	251
Vyšné Ružbachy	17.95	1,465

Population and area values are current for year 2025.
