= Šarišské Jastrabie =

- Municipality
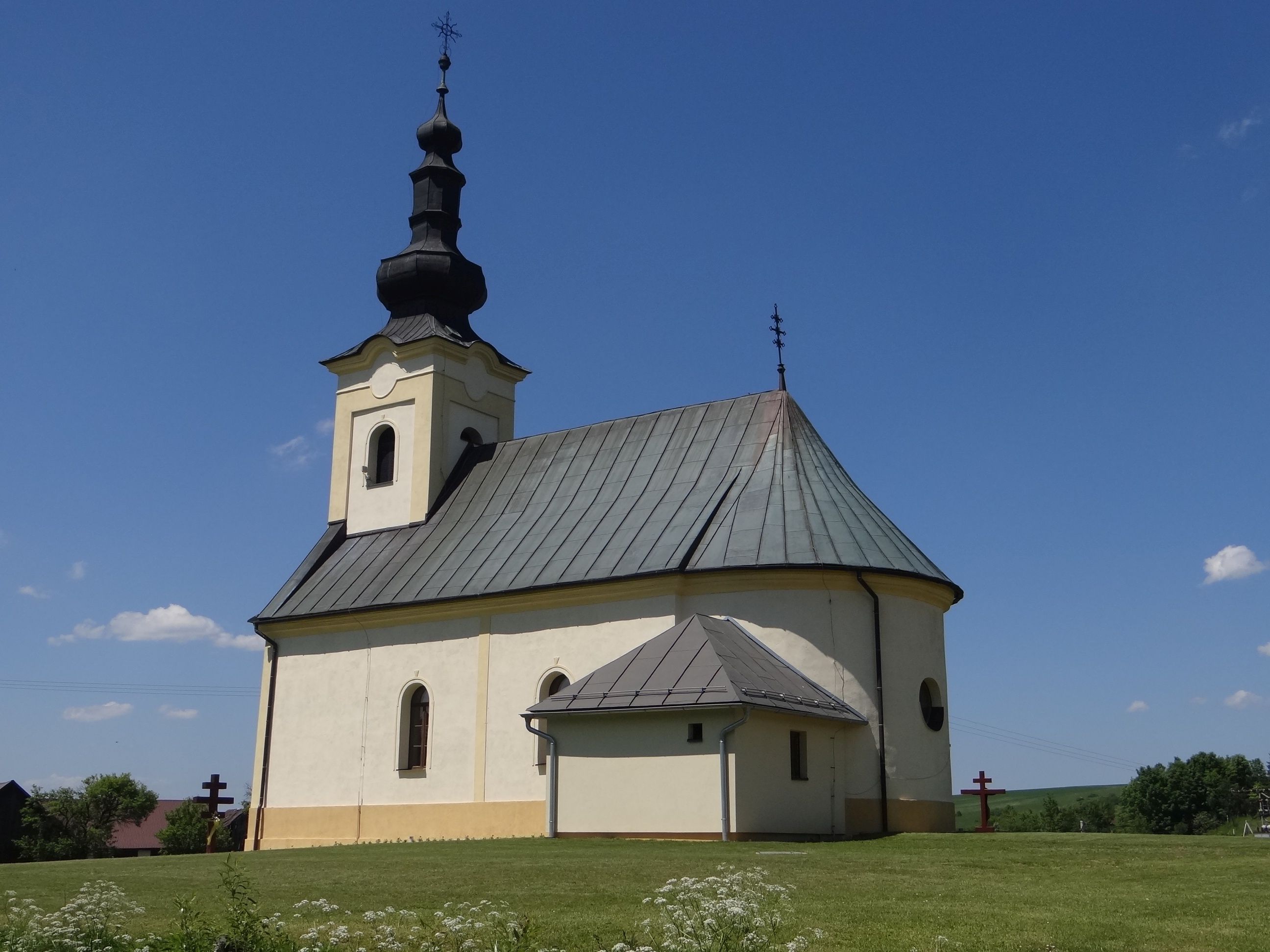

- Flag

- Location of Šarišské Jastrabie in the Prešov Region Location of Šarišské Jastrabie in Slovakia
- Coordinates: 49.242°N 20.909°E
- Country: Slovakia
- Region: Prešov Region
- District: Stará Ľubovňa District
- First mentioned: 1435

Area
  - Total: 21.37 km^{2} (8.25 sq mi)
- Elevation: 572 m (1,877 ft)

Population (2025)
  - Total: 1,638
- Time zone: UTC+1 (CET)
  - Summer (DST): UTC+2 (CEST)
- Postal code: 654 8
- Area code: +421 52
- Vehicle registration plate (until 2022): SL
- Website: www.sarisskejastrabie.sk

Šarišské Jastrabie (Hungarian: Felsőkánya, Rusyn: Шаріське Ястрабє) is a village and municipality in Stará Ľubovňa District in the Prešov Region of northern Slovakia.

== History ==
In historical records, the village was first mentioned in 1435. Before the establishment of independent Czechoslovakia in 1918, Šarišské Jastrabie was part of Sáros County within the Kingdom of Hungary. From 1939 to 1945, it was part of the Slovak Republic. On 22 January 1945, the Red Army dislodged the Wehrmacht from Šarišské Jastrabie and it was once again part of Czechoslovakia.

== Geography ==
The municipality lies at an altitude of 572 metres (1,877 ft) and covers an area of 21.37 km^{2} (8.25 sq mi) (2025).

== Population ==
Population statistic (10 years)
Year	1995	2005	2015	2025
Count	962	1189	1386	1638
Difference		+23.59%	+16.56%	+18.18%

Population statistic
Year	2024	2025
Count	1606	1638
Difference		+1.99%

It has a population of 1638 people (31 December 2025).

=== Ethnicity ===
Census 2021 (1+ %)
Ethnicity	Number	Fraction
Slovak	689	46.17%
Romani	638	42.76%
Rusyn	483	32.37%
Not found out	85	5.69%
Total	1492	

In year 2021 was 1492 people by ethnicity 689 as Slovak, 638 as Romani, 483 as Rusyn, 85 as Not found out, 2 as Russian and 1 as Czech.

Note on population: The difference values of population numbers in the table "Population statistic" and in the sections "Ethnicity" & "Religion" is caused by the use of various statistical methods.

=== Religion ===
Census 2021 (1+ %)
Religion	Number	Fraction
Greek Catholic Church	1274	85.39%
Roman Catholic Church	89	5.97%
Not found out	76	5.09%
None	32	2.14%
Total	1492	

In year 2021 was 1492 people by religion 1274 from Greek Catholic Church, 89 from Roman Catholic Church, 76 from Not found out, 32 from None, 13 from Apostolic Church, 5 from Eastern Orthodox Church and 3 from Other and not ascertained christian church.
