= Sulín =

- Municipality
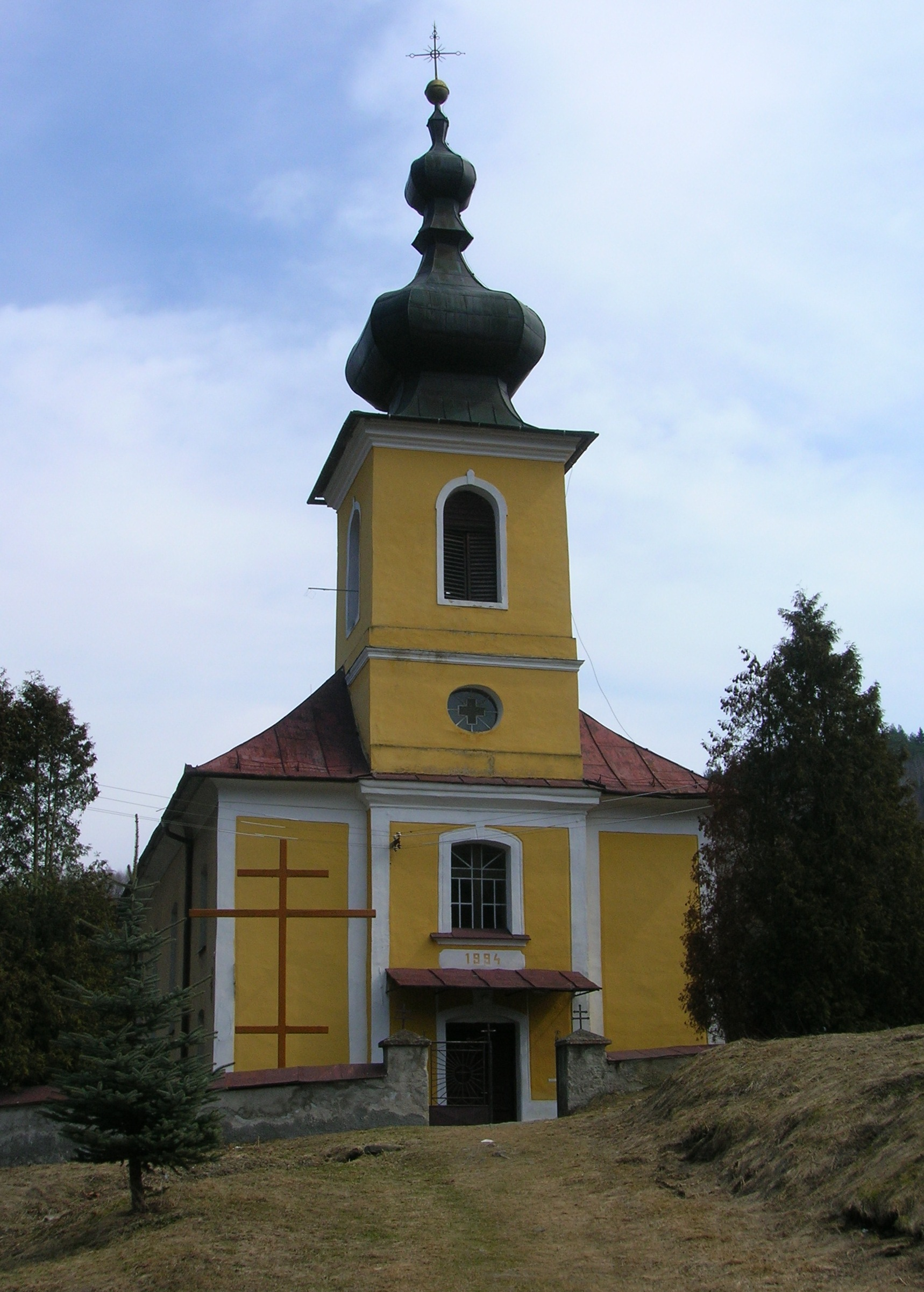

- Flag

- Location of Sulín in the Prešov Region Location of Sulín in Slovakia
- Coordinates: 49.37°N 20.75°E
- Country: Slovakia
- Region: Prešov Region
- District: Stará Ľubovňa District
- First mentioned: 1960

Area
  - Total: 20.16 km^{2} (7.78 sq mi)
- Elevation: 425 m (1,394 ft)

Population (2025)
  - Total: 283
- Time zone: UTC+1 (CET)
  - Summer (DST): UTC+2 (CEST)
- Postal code: 654 3
- Area code: +421 52
- Vehicle registration plate (until 2022): SL
- Website: www.sulin.sk

Sulín (Rusyn: Сулин, romanized: Sulyn; Hungarian: Szulin) is a village and municipality in Stará Ľubovňa District in the Prešov Region of northern Slovakia.

== History ==
In historical records the village was first mentioned in 1960. Before the establishment of independent Czechoslovakia in 1918, Sulín was part of Sáros County within the Kingdom of Hungary. From 1939 to 1945, it was part of the Slovak Republic. On 24 January 1945, the Red Army dislodged the Wehrmacht from Sulín and it was once again part of Czechoslovakia.

A more detailed history with photographs can be found at Sulín - The Carpathian Connection

== Geography ==
The municipality lies at an altitude of 425 metres (1,394 ft) and covers an area of 20.16 km^{2} (7.78 sq mi) (2025).

== Population ==
Population statistic (10 years)
Year	1995	2005	2015	2025
Count	462	409	340	283
Difference		−11.47%	−16.87%	−16.76%

Population statistic
Year	2024	2025
Count	292	283
Difference		−3.08%

It has a population of 283 people (31 December 2025).

=== Ethnicity ===
Census 2021 (1+ %)
Ethnicity	Number	Fraction
Slovak	285	93.44%
Rusyn	112	36.72%
Not found out	9	2.95%
Total	305	

In year 2021 was 305 people by ethnicity 285 as Slovak, 112 as Rusyn, 9 as Not found out, 3 as Ukrainian, 2 as Czech, 1 as Polish and 1 as English.

Note on population: The difference values of population numbers in the table "Population statistic" and in the sections "Ethnicity" & "Religion" is caused by the use of various statistical methods.

=== Religion ===
Census 2021 (1+ %)
Religion	Number	Fraction
Greek Catholic Church	274	89.84%
Roman Catholic Church	21	6.89%
None	4	1.31%
Total	305	

In year 2021 was 305 people by religion 274 from Greek Catholic Church, 21 from Roman Catholic Church, 4 from None, 2 from Eastern Orthodox Church, 2 from Not found out and 2 from Ad hoc movements.
