= Kyjov, Stará Ľubovňa District =

Kyjov
- Municipality
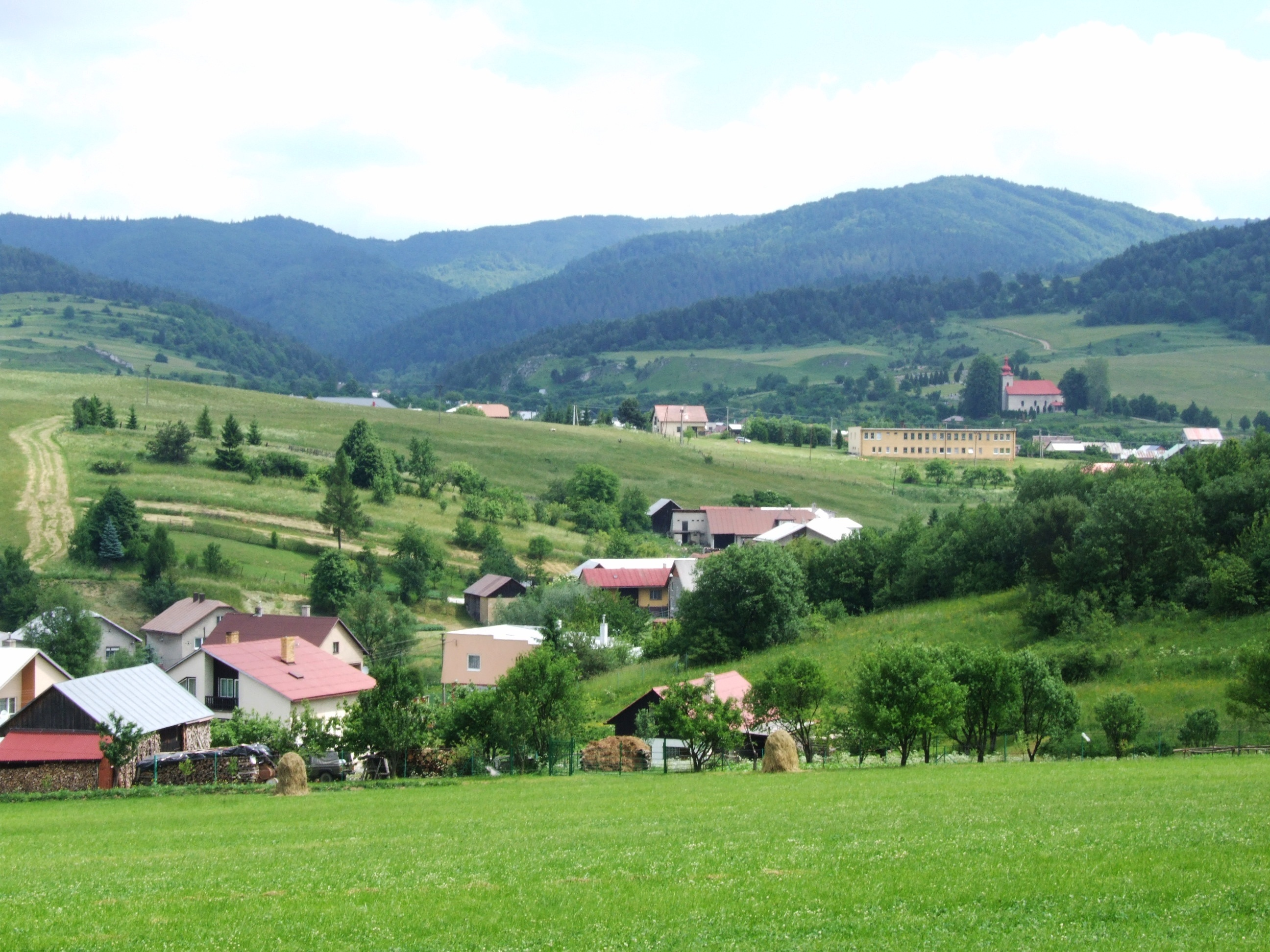

- Flag

- Location of Kyjov in the Prešov Region Location of Kyjov in Slovakia
- Coordinates: 49.22°N 20.94°E
- Country: Slovakia
- Region: Prešov Region
- District: Stará Ľubovňa District
- First mentioned: 1390

Area
  - Total: 15.65 km^{2} (6.04 sq mi)
- Elevation: 670 m (2,200 ft)

Population (2025)
  - Total: 751
- Time zone: UTC+1 (CET)
  - Summer (DST): UTC+2 (CEST)
- Postal code: 654 8
- Area code: +421 52
- Vehicle registration plate (until 2022): SL
- Website: www.obec-kyjov.sk

Kyjov (Rusyn: Кыёв; Hungarian: Kijó) is a village and municipality in Stará Ľubovňa District in the Prešov Region of northern Slovakia.

== History ==
In historical records the village was first mentioned in 1390. Before the establishment of independent Czechoslovakia in 1918, Kyjov was part of Sáros County within the Kingdom of Hungary. From 1939 to 1945, it was part of the Slovak Republic. On 22 January 1945, the Red Army dislodged the Wehrmacht from Kyjov and it was once again part of Czechoslovakia.

== Geography ==
The municipality lies at an altitude of 670 metres (2,200 ft) and covers an area of 15.65 km^{2} (6.04 sq mi) (2025).

== Population ==
Population statistic (10 years)
Year	1995	2005	2015	2025
Count	718	757	766	751
Difference		+5.43%	+1.18%	−1.95%

Population statistic
Year	2024	2025
Count	740	751
Difference		+1.48%

It has a population of 751 people (31 December 2025).

=== Ethnicity ===
Census 2021 (1+ %)
Ethnicity	Number	Fraction
Slovak	674	91.45%
Romani	301	40.84%
Rusyn	241	32.7%
Not found out	15	2.03%
Total	737	

In year 2021 was 737 people by ethnicity 674 as Slovak, 301 as Romani, 241 as Rusyn, 15 as Not found out, 4 as Ukrainian, 3 as Other, 1 as Czech and 1 as Hungarian.

Note on population: The difference values of population numbers in the table "Population statistic" and in the sections "Ethnicity" & "Religion" is caused by the use of various statistical methods.

=== Religion ===
Census 2021 (1+ %)
Religion	Number	Fraction
Greek Catholic Church	615	83.45%
None	61	8.28%
Roman Catholic Church	45	6.11%
Eastern Orthodox Church	8	1.09%
Not found out	8	1.09%
Total	737	

In year 2021 was 737 people by religion 615 from Greek Catholic Church, 61 from None, 45 from Roman Catholic Church, 8 from Eastern Orthodox Church and 8 from Not found out.
