= Hajtovka =

Village and municipality in Slovakia

- Municipality
- Flag

- Location of Hajtovka in the Prešov Region Location of Hajtovka in Slovakia
- Coordinates: 49.30°N 20.78°E
- Country: Slovakia
- Region: Prešov Region
- District: Stará Ľubovňa District
- First mentioned: 1427

Area
  - Total: 3.04 km^{2} (1.17 sq mi)
- Elevation: 538 m (1,765 ft)

Population (2025)
  - Total: 83
- Time zone: UTC+1 (CET)
  - Summer (DST): UTC+2 (CEST)
- Postal code: 654 5
- Area code: +421 52
- Vehicle registration plate (until 2022): SL
- Website: obechajtovka.sk

Hajtovka (Rusyn: Гайтівка, romanized: Haitivka; Hungarian: Hajtóka) is a village and municipality in Stará Ľubovňa District in the Prešov Region of northern Slovakia.

== History ==
In historical records the village was first mentioned in 1427. Before the establishment of independent Czechoslovakia in 1918, Hajtovka was part of Sáros County within the Kingdom of Hungary. From 1939 to 1945, it was part of the Slovak Republic. On 24 January 1945, the Red Army dislodged the Wehrmacht from Hajtovka and it was once again part of Czechoslovakia.

== Geography ==
The municipality lies at an altitude of 538 metres (1,765 ft) and covers an area of 3.04 km^{2} (1.17 sq mi) (2025).

== Population ==
Population statistic (10 years)
Year	1995	2005	2015	2025
Count	109	89	73	83
Difference		−18.34%	−17.97%	+13.69%

Population statistic
Year	2024	2025
Count	75	83
Difference		+10.66%

It has a population of 83 people (31 December 2025).

=== Ethnicity ===
Census 2021 (1+%)
Ethnicity	Number	Fraction
Slovak	63	92.64%
Rusyn	23	33.82%
Czech	2	2.94%
Not found out	2	2.94%
Russian	1	1.47%
Total	68	

In year 2021 was 68 people by ethnicity 63 as Slovak, 23 as Rusyn, 2 as Czech, 2 as Not found out and 1 as Russian.

Note on population: The difference values of population numbers in the table "Population statistic" and in the sections "Ethnicity" & "Religion" is caused by the use of various statistical methods.

=== Religion ===
Census 2021 (1+%)
Religion	Number	Fraction
Greek Catholic Church	50	73.53%
Roman Catholic Church	9	13.24%
None	5	7.35%
Not found out	2	2.94%
Eastern Orthodox Church	1	1.47%
Evangelical Church	1	1.47%
Total	68	

In year 2021 was 68 people by religion 50 from Greek Catholic Church, 9 from Roman Catholic Church, 5 from None, 2 from Not found out, 1 from Eastern Orthodox Church and 1 from Evangelical Church.

== Genealogical resources ==
The records for genealogical research are available at the state archive "Statny Archiv in Presov, Slovakia"

- Roman Catholic church records (births/marriages/deaths): 1686-1924 (parish B)
- Greek Catholic church records (births/marriages/deaths): 1827-1933 (parish B)

== See also ==
- List of municipalities and towns in Slovakia
