= Forbasy =

Village and municipality in Slovakia

- Municipality
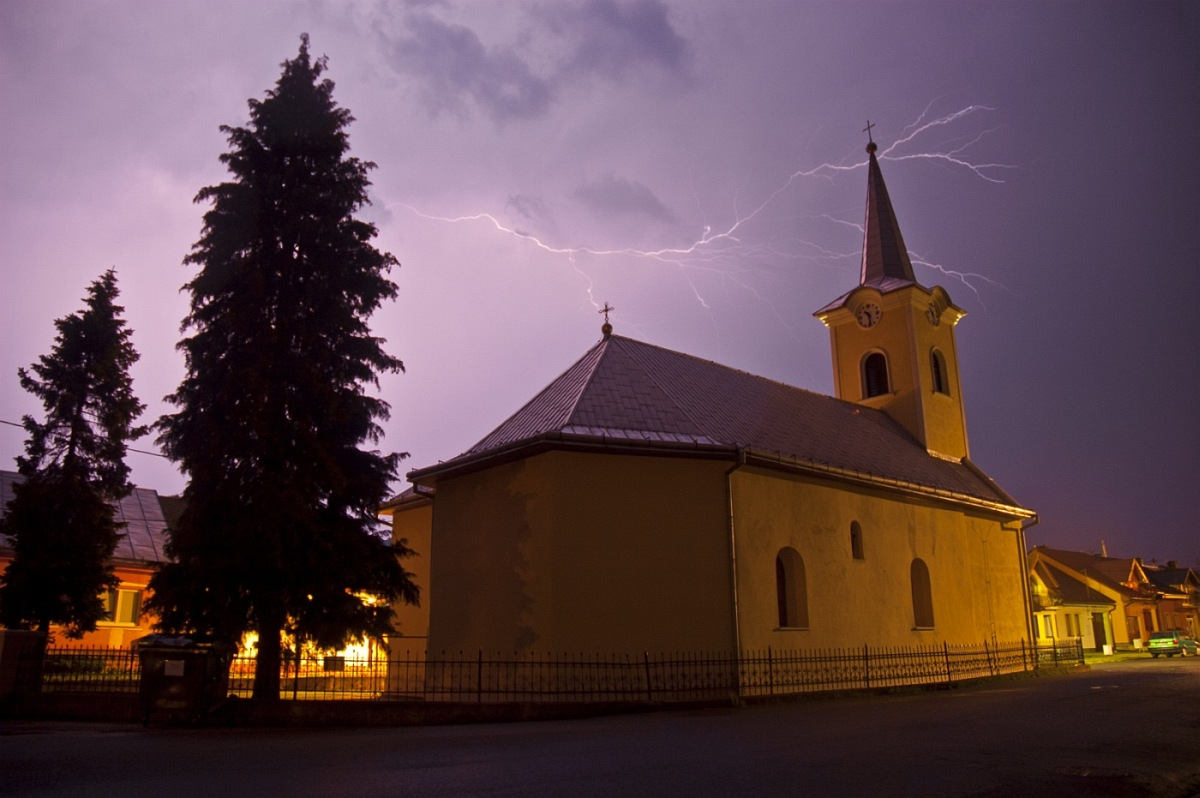

- Flag

- Location of Forbasy in the Prešov Region Location of Forbasy in Slovakia
- Coordinates: 49.30°N 20.62°E
- Country: Slovakia
- Region: Prešov Region
- District: Stará Ľubovňa District
- First mentioned: 1311

Area
  - Total: 4.44 km^{2} (1.71 sq mi)
- Elevation: 537 m (1,762 ft)

Population (2025)
  - Total: 450
- Time zone: UTC+1 (CET)
  - Summer (DST): UTC+2 (CEST)
- Postal code: 650 1
- Area code: +421 52
- Vehicle registration plate (until 2022): SL
- Website: www.forbasy.eu

Forbasy (Hungarian: Poprádfalu, Rusyn: Форбасы) is a village and municipality in Stará Ľubovňa District in the Prešov Region of northern Slovakia.

== History ==
The village was first mentioned in 1311 Before the establishment of independent Czechoslovakia in 1918, Forbasy was part of Szepes County within the Kingdom of Hungary. From 1939 to 1945, it was part of the Slovak Republic.

== Geography ==
The municipality lies at an altitude of 537 metres (1,762 ft) and covers an area of 4.44 km^{2} (1.71 sq mi) (2025).

== Population ==
Population statistic (10 years)
Year	1995	2005	2015	2025
Count	369	389	426	450
Difference		+5.42%	+9.51%	+5.63%

Population statistic
Year	2024	2025
Count	440	450
Difference		+2.27%

It has a population of 450 people (31 December 2025).

=== Ethnicity ===
Census 2021 (1+ %)
Ethnicity	Number	Fraction
Slovak	451	98.25%
Not found out	66	14.37%
Rusyn	14	3.05%
Total	459	

In year 2021 was 459 people by ethnicity 451 as Slovak, 66 as Not found out, 14 as Rusyn, 4 as Polish, 4 as German, 2 as Other, 1 as Czech and 1 as Ukrainian.

Note on population: The difference values of population numbers in the table "Population statistic" and in the sections "Ethnicity" & "Religion" is caused by the use of various statistical methods.

=== Religion ===
Census 2021 (1+ %)
Religion	Number	Fraction
Roman Catholic Church	388	84.53%
Greek Catholic Church	44	9.59%
None	20	4.36%
Total	459	

In year 2021 was 459 people by religion 388 from Roman Catholic Church, 44 from Greek Catholic Church, 20 from None, 3 from Not found out, 3 from Ad hoc movements and 1 from Other.

== Genealogical resources ==
The records for genealogical research are available at the state archive "Statny Archiv in Levoca, Slovakia"

- Roman Catholic church records (births/marriages/deaths): 1624-1945 (parish B)

== See also ==
- List of municipalities and towns in Slovakia
