= Hraničné =

Village and municipality in Slovakia

- Municipality
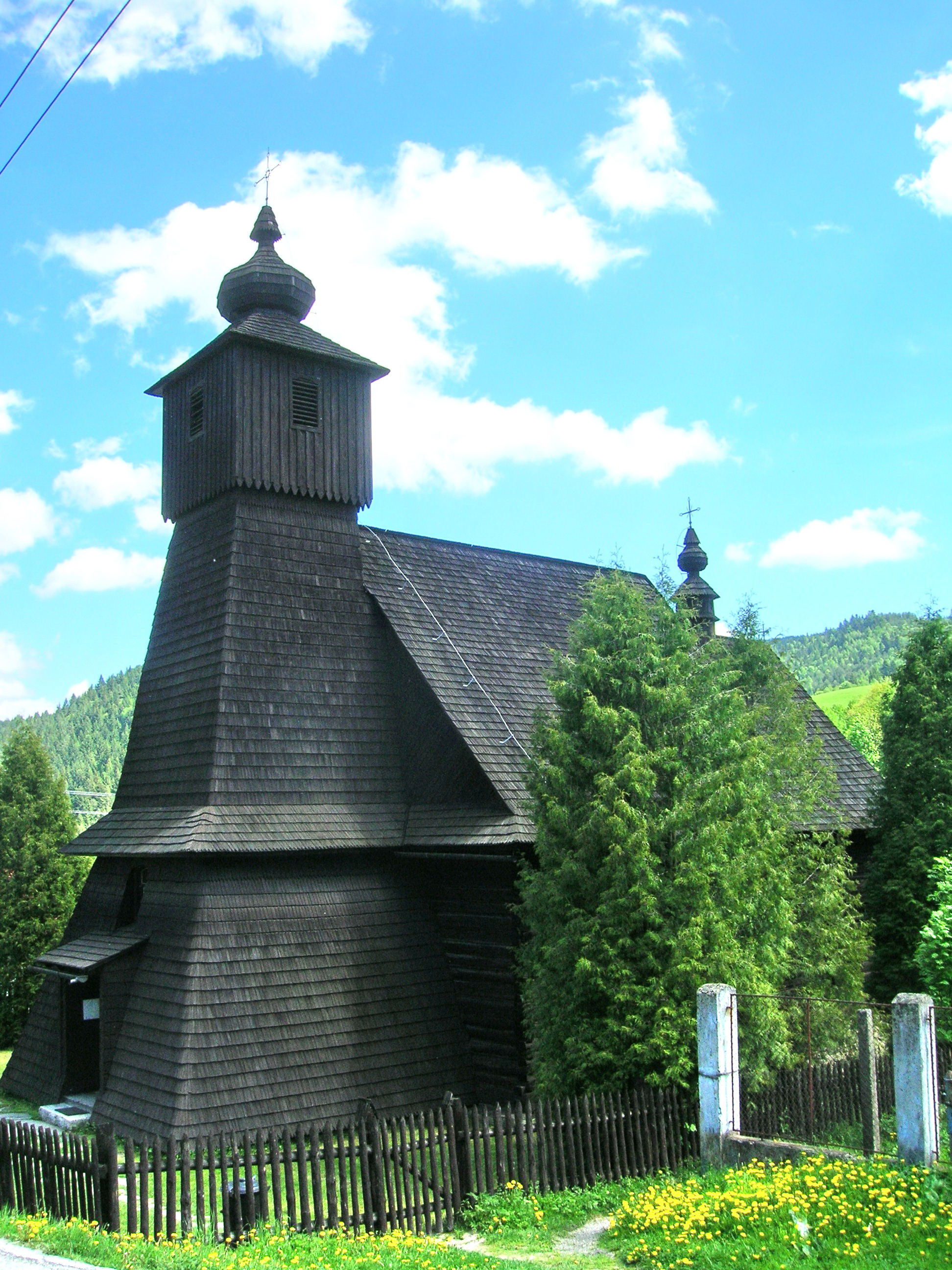

- Flag

- Location of Hraničné in the Prešov Region Location of Hraničné in Slovakia
- Coordinates: 49.37°N 20.72°E
- Country: Slovakia
- Region: Prešov Region
- District: Stará Ľubovňa District
- First mentioned: 1342

Area
  - Total: 7.56 km^{2} (2.92 sq mi)
- Elevation: 534 m (1,752 ft)

Population (2025)
  - Total: 177
- Time zone: UTC+1 (CET)
  - Summer (DST): UTC+2 (CEST)
- Postal code: 652 1
- Area code: +421 52
- Vehicle registration plate (until 2022): SL
- Website: www.hranicne.sk

Hraničné (Hungarian: Határhely, German: Grenzdorf, Rusyn: Гранічне) is a village and municipality in Stará Ľubovňa District in the Prešov Region of northern Slovakia.

== History ==
In historical records the village was first mentioned in 1342. The village was formerly known as Grenzdorf in German. The wooden church there was built in 1785. Before the establishment of independent Czechoslovakia in 1918, Hraničné was part of Szepes County within the Kingdom of Hungary. From 1939 to 1945, it was part of the Slovak Republic. On 24 January 1945, the Red Army dislodged the Wehrmacht from Hraničné and it was once again part of Czechoslovakia.

In August 2021 it was announced that the road connecting the village to neighbouring Kremná would be repaired using EU funds.

== Geography ==
The municipality lies at an altitude of 534 metres (1,752 ft) and covers an area of 7.56 km^{2} (2.92 sq mi) (2025).

== Population ==
Population statistic (10 years)
Year	1995	2005	2015	2025
Count	252	222	191	177
Difference		−11.90%	−13.96%	−7.32%

Population statistic
Year	2024	2025
Count	177	177
Difference		+0%

It has a population of 177 people (31 December 2025).

=== Ethnicity ===
Census 2021 (1+ %)
Ethnicity	Number	Fraction
Slovak	192	99.48%
Not found out	61	31.6%
Rusyn	6	3.1%
Total	193	

In year 2021 was 193 people by ethnicity 192 as Slovak, 61 as Not found out, 6 as Rusyn and 1 as Polish.

Note on population: The difference values of population numbers in the table "Population statistic" and in the sections "Ethnicity" & "Religion" is caused by the use of various statistical methods.

=== Religion ===
Census 2021 (1+ %)
Religion	Number	Fraction
Roman Catholic Church	168	87.05%
Greek Catholic Church	19	9.84%
None	5	2.59%
Total	193	

In year 2021 was 193 people by religion 168 from Roman Catholic Church, 19 from Greek Catholic Church, 5 from None and 1 from Evangelical Church.

== Genealogical resources ==
The records for genealogical research are available at the state archive "Statny Archiv in Levoca, Slovakia"

- Roman Catholic church records (births/marriages/deaths): 1787-1939 (parish B)
- Greek Catholic church records (births/marriages/deaths): 1788-1949 (parish B)

== See also ==
- List of municipalities and towns in Slovakia
