= Pusté Pole =

- Municipality
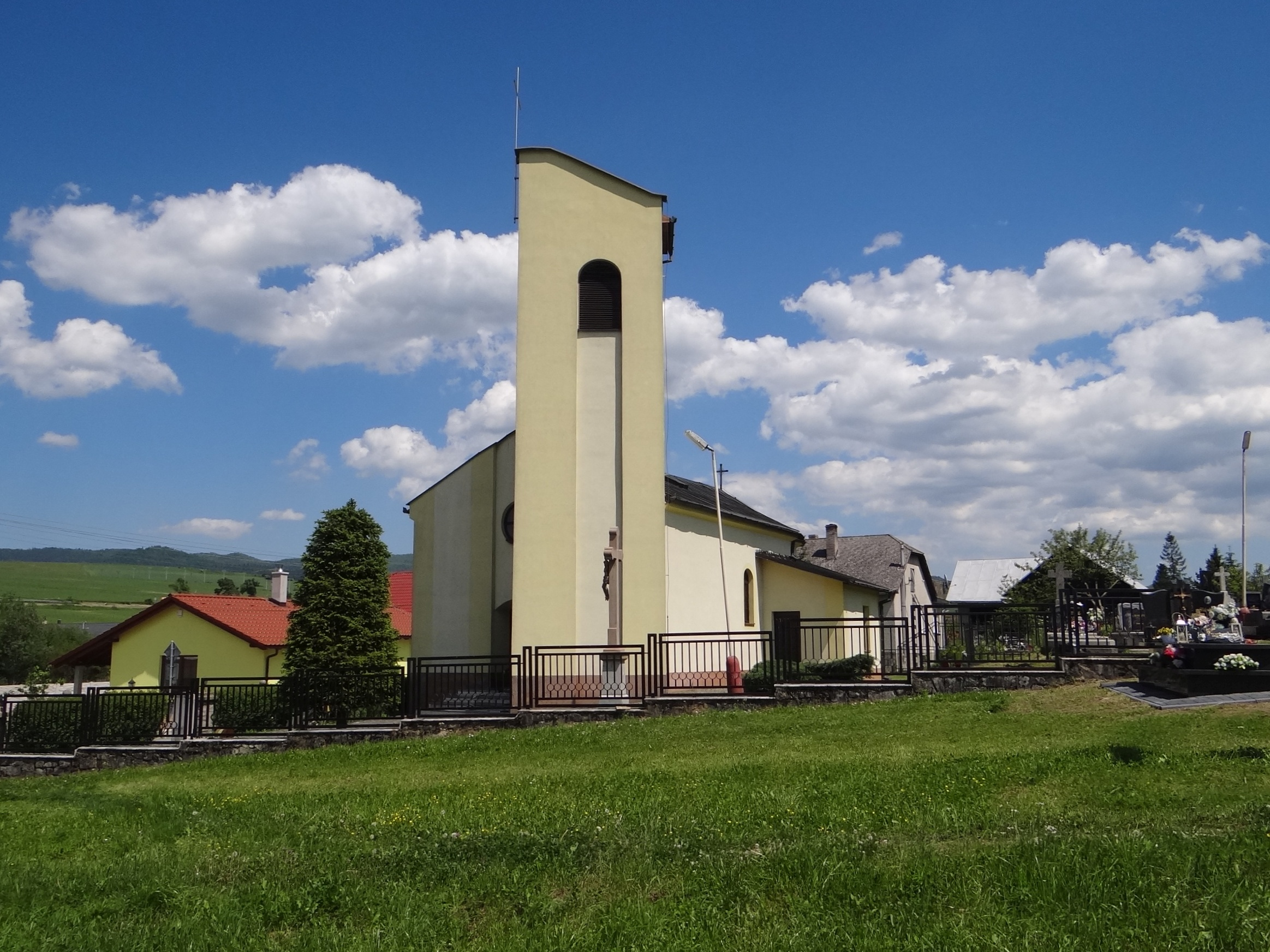

- Flag

- Location of Pusté Pole in the Prešov Region Location of Pusté Pole in Slovakia
- Coordinates: 49.22°N 20.90°E
- Country: Slovakia
- Region: Prešov Region
- District: Stará Ľubovňa District
- First mentioned: 1956

Area
  - Total: 3.23 km^{2} (1.25 sq mi)
- Elevation: 573 m (1,880 ft)

Population (2025)
  - Total: 233
- Time zone: UTC+1 (CET)
  - Summer (DST): UTC+2 (CEST)
- Postal code: 654 1
- Area code: +421 52
- Vehicle registration plate (until 2022): SL
- Website: pustepole.sk/sk

Pusté Pole (Hungarian: Kriványpusztamező, Rusyn: Пусте Поле) is a village and municipality in Stará Ľubovňa District in the Prešov Region of northern Slovakia.

== History ==
In historical records the village was first mentioned in 1325. Before the establishment of independent Czechoslovakia in 1918, Pusté Pole was part of Sáros County within the Kingdom of Hungary. From 1939 to 1945, it was part of the Slovak Republic.

== Geography ==
The municipality lies at an altitude of 573 metres (1,880 ft) and covers an area of 3.23 km^{2} (1.25 sq mi) (2025).

== Population ==
Population statistic (10 years)
Year	1995	2005	2015	2025
Count	212	227	218	233
Difference		+7.07%	−3.96%	+6.88%

Population statistic
Year	2024	2025
Count	223	233
Difference		+4.48%

It has a population of 233 people (31 December 2025).

=== Ethnicity ===
Census 2021 (1+ %)
Ethnicity	Number	Fraction
Slovak	210	96.77%
Rusyn	8	3.68%
Romani	7	3.22%
Not found out	3	1.38%
Total	217	

In year 2021 was 217 people by ethnicity 210 as Slovak, 8 as Rusyn, 7 as Romani, 3 as Not found out, 1 as Russian and 1 as Hungarian.

Note on population: The difference values of population numbers in the table "Population statistic" and in the sections "Ethnicity" & "Religion" is caused by the use of various statistical methods.

=== Religion ===
Census 2021 (1+ %)
Religion	Number	Fraction
Roman Catholic Church	184	84.79%
Greek Catholic Church	21	9.68%
None	9	4.15%
Total	217	

In year 2021 was 217 people by religion 184 from Roman Catholic Church, 21 from Greek Catholic Church, 9 from None, 1 from Paganism and natural spirituality, 1 from Other and not ascertained christian church and 1 from Not found out.
