= Ruská Voľa nad Popradom =

Village and municipality in Slovakia

- Municipality
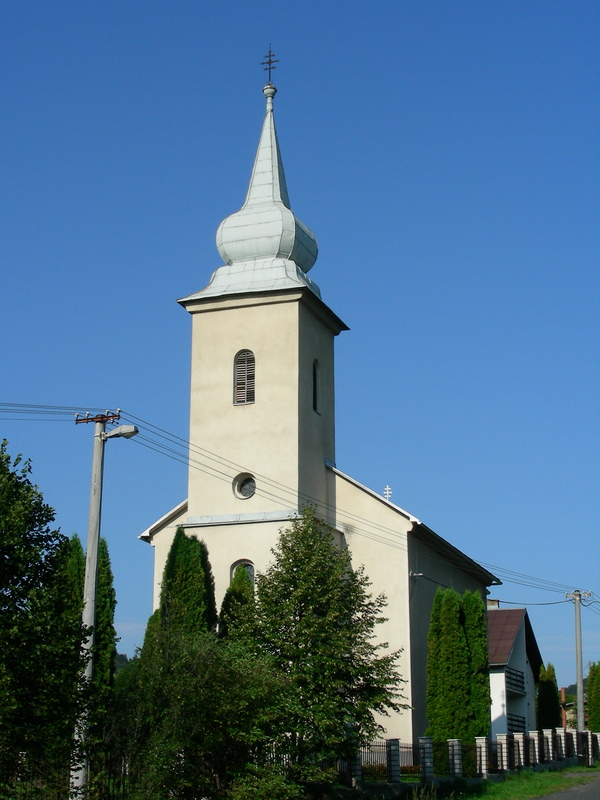

- Flag Coat of arms

- Location of Ruská Voľa nad Popradom in the Prešov Region Location of Ruská Voľa nad Popradom in Slovakia
- Coordinates: 49.30°N 20.94°E
- Country: Slovakia
- Region: Prešov Region
- District: Stará Ľubovňa District
- First mentioned: 1357

Area
  - Total: 6.02 km^{2} (2.32 sq mi)
- Elevation: 515 m (1,690 ft)

Population (2025)
  - Total: 79
- Time zone: UTC+1 (CET)
  - Summer (DST): UTC+2 (CEST)
- Postal code: 654 2
- Area code: +421 52
- Vehicle registration plate (until 2022): SL
- Website: ruskavolanadpopradom.sk

Ruská Voľa nad Popradom (Hungarian: Poprádökrös, Rusyn: Руська Воля над Попрадом) is a village and municipality in Stará Ľubovňa District in the Prešov Region of northern Slovakia.

== History ==
In historical records the village was first mentioned in 1357.

Other names of the municipality: 1588 Nowawolya, Volya, 1635 Volya, noviter sicata, 1773 Ruska Wolya, Orosz-Volya, 1786 Orosz Wolya, 1808 Orosz-Alsó-Vólya et Orosz Felso-Volya, Ruská Wola, 1863 Oroszvolya, 1907 Poprádokros, 1920 Ruská Voľa, 1960 Ruská Voľa nad Popradom, in Hungarian Poprádokros.

The territory between the Poprad and the Obručné rivers, which was mostly forested, was received, in 1312, by noble Rikolf, owner of the Kamenica estate, from King Karol Róbert (Charles Robert). However, at that time the municipality did not exist. The first report of the existence of the municipality goes back to the year 1588, when it was allegedly taken over by Juraj Horvát, owner of the Plaveč estate. The village, however, existed already before the year 1588. it was established around 1580. Its original name Vôľa proves that the village was established by šoltýs with settlers based on emfyteutic right.

The subjects were obliged to pay taxes to the king for the first time as late as in 1600. at that time the settlement that at least 7 houses. The population predominantly consisted of liege people. They were wood cutters or sheep shepherds with small arable land. As late as in 1636 they were not considered farmers but owners of small property only. In 1718 11 families left the village and moved to Poland. In 1787, the village had 12 and in 1828 33 houses.

In the 19th century the Bornemis and Dezofi families had their estates there. Inhabitants were farmers, cattle raisers and worked in forests. Before the establishment of independent Czechoslovakia in 1918, Ruská Voľa nad Popradom was part of Sáros County within the Kingdom of Hungary. After 1918 the economic activity of inhabitants did not change. From 1939 to 1945, the municipality was part of the Slovak Republic. During the 2nd world war the inhabitants helped Polish refugees, supported illegal workers and guerilla groups operating in the vicinity.

On 21 January 1945, the Red Army dislodged the Wehrmacht from Ruská Voľa nad Popradom and it was once again part of Czechoslovakia. After liberation, a revolutionary national council was established. The 1946 elections were won by KSS, out of 149 votes it received 73, DS (Democratic Party) 24, Strana práce (Labour Party) 48, Strana slobody (Freedom Party) 2 votes. In 1947 5 families and 3 citizens opted to move to the USSR.

Electricity was introduced to the village in 1959, public lighting, local radio, municipal council building were built in 1965, Jednota SD in 1973, local roads, water supply system in 1983, tennis courts, pavements, new residential houses and other buildings were built too. Public cooperative farm (JRD) established in 1950, disintegrated. It was reestablished in 1958.

== Population ==
Population statistic (10 years)
Year	1995	2005	2015	2025
Count	127	106	101	79
Difference		−16.53%	−4.71%	−21.78%

Population statistic
Year	2024	2025
Count	85	79
Difference		−7.05%

It has a population of 79 people (31 December 2025).

=== Ethnicity ===
Census 2021 (1+ %)
Ethnicity	Number	Fraction
Slovak	56	70%
Rusyn	41	51.25%
Ukrainian	3	3.75%
Not found out	3	3.75%
Total	80	

In year 2021 was 80 people by ethnicity 56 as Slovak, 41 as Rusyn, 3 as Ukrainian and 3 as Not found out.

Note on population: The difference values of population numbers in the table "Population statistic" and in the sections "Ethnicity" & "Religion" is caused by the use of various statistical methods.

=== Religion ===
Census 2021 (1+ %)
Religion	Number	Fraction
Greek Catholic Church	68	85%
Roman Catholic Church	9	11.25%
Eastern Orthodox Church	2	2.5%
Not found out	1	1.25%
Total	80	

In year 2021 was 80 people by religion 68 from Greek Catholic Church, 9 from Roman Catholic Church, 2 from Eastern Orthodox Church and 1 from Not found out.

=== Historical ===
Inhabitants

- 1787 - 114 inh.,
- 1828 - 260 inh.,
- 1869 - 293 inh.,
- 1880 - 236 inh.,
- 1890 - 235 inh.,
- 1900 - 179 inh.,
- 1910 - 208 inh.,
- 1921 - 188 inh.,
- 1930 - 216 inh.,
- 1940 - 227 inh.,
- 1948 - 191 inh.,
- 1961 - 207 inh.,
- 1970 - 205 inh.,
- 1980 - 183 inh.,
- 1991 - 123 inh.,
- 2009 – est. 108 inh.

== Geography ==
The municipality lies at an altitude of 515 metres (1,690 ft) and covers an area of 6.02 km^{2} (2.32 sq mi) (2025).

== Landmarks ==
- St. Michael church (Greek Catholic), single-aisle with presbytery, built in 1916-1919, re-built 1952.
- Jewish cemetery.

== People ==
- Ján Fecko (1941) - player of Taran Prešov handball team for many years, master of Sports and representative of the CSSR;
- Ján Birčák, Dr.h.c. prof. RNDr. PhD. (1937) university teacher – physicist (http://naturescience.fhpv.unipo.sk/kontakty/bircak.htm)
