= Malý Lipník =

- Municipality
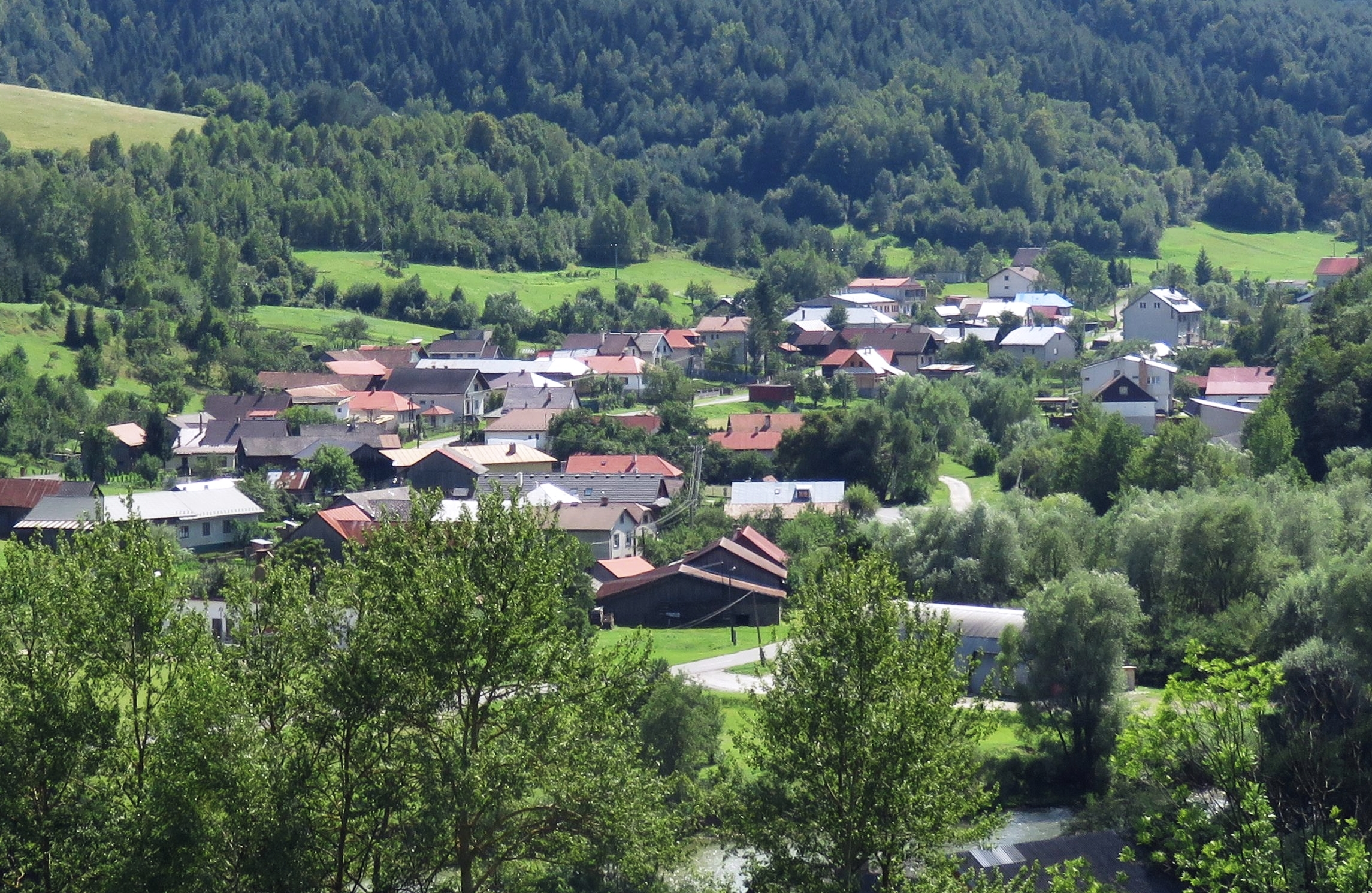

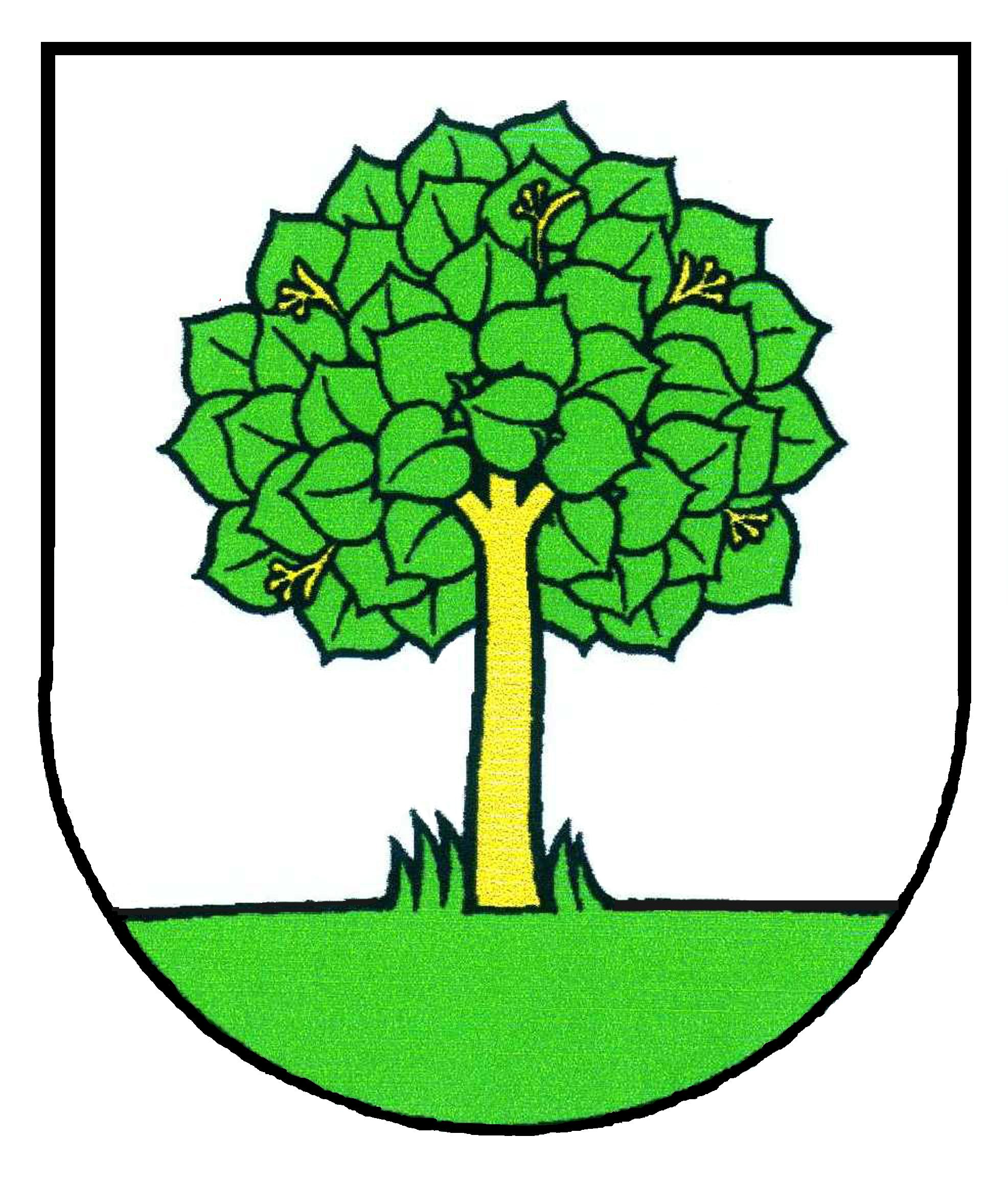
- Flag Coat of arms

- Location of Malý Lipník in the Prešov Region Location of Malý Lipník in Slovakia
- Coordinates: 49.327°N 20.788°E
- Country: Slovakia
- Region: Prešov Region
- District: Stará Ľubovňa District
- First mentioned: 1715

Area
  - Total: 13.74 km^{2} (5.31 sq mi)
- Elevation: 452 m (1,483 ft)

Population (2025)
  - Total: 490
- Time zone: UTC+1 (CET)
  - Summer (DST): UTC+2 (CEST)
- Postal code: 654 6
- Area code: +421 52
- Vehicle registration plate (until 2022): SL
- Website: obecmalylipnik.sk

Malý Lipník (Hungarian: Kishárs; Rusyn: Малый Липник; Ukrainian: Малий Липник, romanized: Malyi Lypnyk) is a village and municipality in Stará Ľubovňa District in the Prešov Region of northern Slovakia.

== Geography ==
The municipality lies at an altitude of 452 metres (1,483 ft) and covers an area of 13.74 km^{2} (5.31 sq mi) (2025).

== History ==
The village of Malý Lipník is mentioned for the first time in a hand-written chronicle in 1715. In other historic periods the village carried these names; in 1715 Kis Lipnik, in 1786 Lipnik, in 1927 Malý Lipník; in Hungarian Kislipnik, Kisharas. The Greek Catholic Church of Cosmos and Damien is a made of stone and the church cemetery is located on a hill to the side of the church.

Before the establishment of independent Czechoslovakia in 1918, Malý Lipník was part of Sáros County within the Kingdom of Hungary. From 1939 to 1945, it was part of the Slovak Republic. On 24 January 1945, the Red Army dislodged the Wehrmacht from Malý Lipník and it was once again part of Czechoslovakia.

== Population ==
Population statistic (10 years)
Year	1995	2005	2015	2025
Count	481	458	455	490
Difference		−4.78%	−0.65%	+7.69%

Population statistic
Year	2024	2025
Count	484	490
Difference		+1.23%

It has a population of 490 people (31 December 2025).

=== Ethnicity ===
Census 2021 (1+ %)
Ethnicity	Number	Fraction
Slovak	419	92.08%
Rusyn	178	39.12%
Not found out	7	1.53%
Total	455	

In year 2021 was 455 people by ethnicity 419 as Slovak, 178 as Rusyn, 7 as Not found out, 3 as Czech, 3 as English, 2 as Polish and 1 as Ukrainian.

Note on population: The difference values of population numbers in the table "Population statistic" and in the sections "Ethnicity" & "Religion" is caused by the use of various statistical methods.

=== Religion ===
Census 2021 (1+ %)
Religion	Number	Fraction
Greek Catholic Church	360	79.12%
Roman Catholic Church	81	17.8%
None	6	1.32%
Total	455	

In year 2021 was 455 people by religion 360 from Greek Catholic Church, 81 from Roman Catholic Church, 6 from None, 3 from Paganism and natural spirituality, 3 from Not found out and 2 from Eastern Orthodox Church.
