= Veľký Lipník =

- Municipality
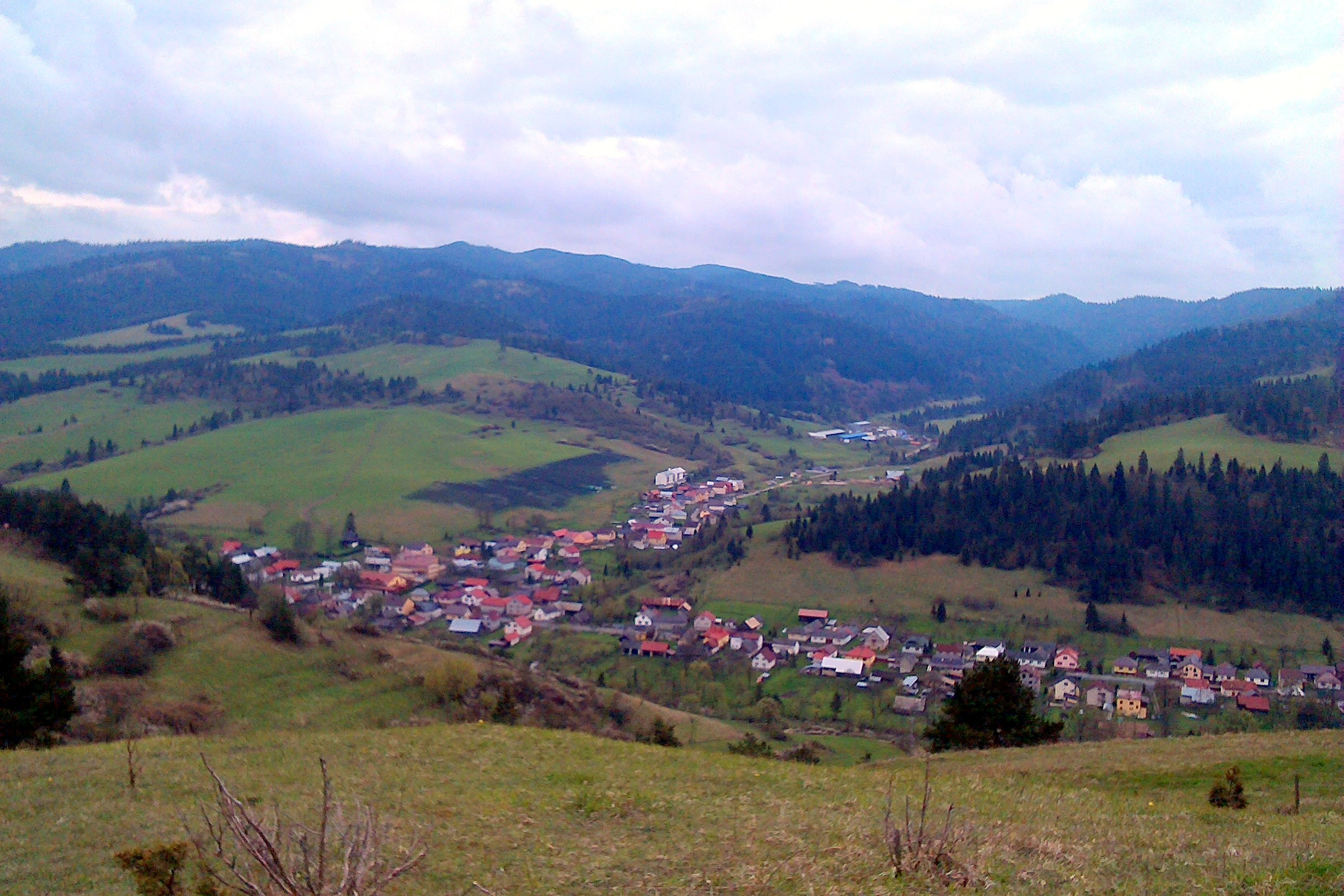

- Flag

- Location of Veľký Lipník in the Prešov Region Location of Veľký Lipník in Slovakia
- Coordinates: 49.37°N 20.52°E
- Country: Slovakia
- Region: Prešov Region
- District: Stará Ľubovňa District
- First mentioned: 1338

Area
  - Total: 27.51 km^{2} (10.62 sq mi)
- Elevation: 569 m (1,867 ft)

Population (2025)
  - Total: 903
- Time zone: UTC+1 (CET)
  - Summer (DST): UTC+2 (CEST)
- Postal code: 653 3
- Area code: +421 52
- Vehicle registration plate (until 2022): SL
- Website: www.velkylipnik.sk

Veľký Lipník (Rusyn: Великый Липник; Ukrainian: Великий Липник; Hungarian: Nagyhársas) is a former Lemko village and municipality in Stará Ľubovňa District in the Prešov Region of northern Slovakia. The village is traditionally inhabited by Rusyny/Ruthenians, as one of their westernmost settlements. There is Greek Catholic church built in 1794.

== History ==
The village of Vel’ky Lipník began behind the Spišská Magura mountain range which is part of the outer western Carpathian mountains which reach to the international border with Poland. Settlement began in this area early but in the second half of the 13th century during the reign of Hungarian King Béla IV, Ruthenians and Germans settled in the area during the years of 1235 to 1270. During the years 1308 to 1342 Hungarian King Karol Róbert donated this area to Julius Gorgey from Spišský Hrhov-Gargov. In 1314 the first written mention of Veľký Lipník was made. During the 15th and 16th century the village was inhabited mostly by Ruthenians from Southern Poland (Galicia.) They mostly worked as farmers and also bred various livestock. Due to their working mostly on farms, the village crest which was utilized from the 16th to the 19th century denoted this trade. Before the establishment of independent Czechoslovakia in 1918, Veľký Lipník was part of Szepes County within the Kingdom of Hungary. From 1939 to 1945, it was part of the Slovak Republic. On 25 January 1945, the Red Army dislodged the Wehrmacht from Veľký Lipník and it was once again part of Czechoslovakia.

== Geography ==
The municipality lies at an altitude of 569 metres (1,867 ft) and covers an area of 27.51 km^{2} (10.62 sq mi) (2025).

== Population ==
Population statistic (10 years)
Year	1995	2005	2015	2025
Count	995	1026	972	903
Difference		+3.11%	−5.26%	−7.09%

Population statistic
Year	2024	2025
Count	895	903
Difference		+0.89%

It has a population of 903 people (31 December 2025).

=== Ethnicity ===
Census 2021 (1+ %)
Ethnicity	Number	Fraction
Slovak	801	87.63%
Rusyn	401	43.87%
Not found out	29	3.17%
Total	914	

In year 2021 was 914 people by ethnicity 801 as Slovak, 401 as Rusyn, 29 as Not found out, 3 as Czech, 3 as Irish, 3 as Polish, 2 as Ukrainian, 2 as Other, 1 as Italian, 1 as Romanian, 1 as Austrian, 1 as German and 1 as English.

Note on population: The difference values of population numbers in the table "Population statistic" and in the sections "Ethnicity" & "Religion" is caused by the use of various statistical methods.

=== Religion ===
Census 2021 (1+ %)
Religion	Number	Fraction
Greek Catholic Church	732	80.09%
Roman Catholic Church	107	11.71%
None	43	4.7%
Eastern Orthodox Church	13	1.42%
Total	914	

In year 2021 was 914 people by religion 732 from Greek Catholic Church, 107 from Roman Catholic Church, 43 from None, 13 from Eastern Orthodox Church, 8 from Not found out, 4 from Other and not ascertained christian church, 2 from Christian Congregations in Slovakia, 2 from Ad hoc movements, 1 from Other, 1 from Buddhism and 1 from Baptists Church.
