= Vislanka =

Community in Slovakia

- Municipality
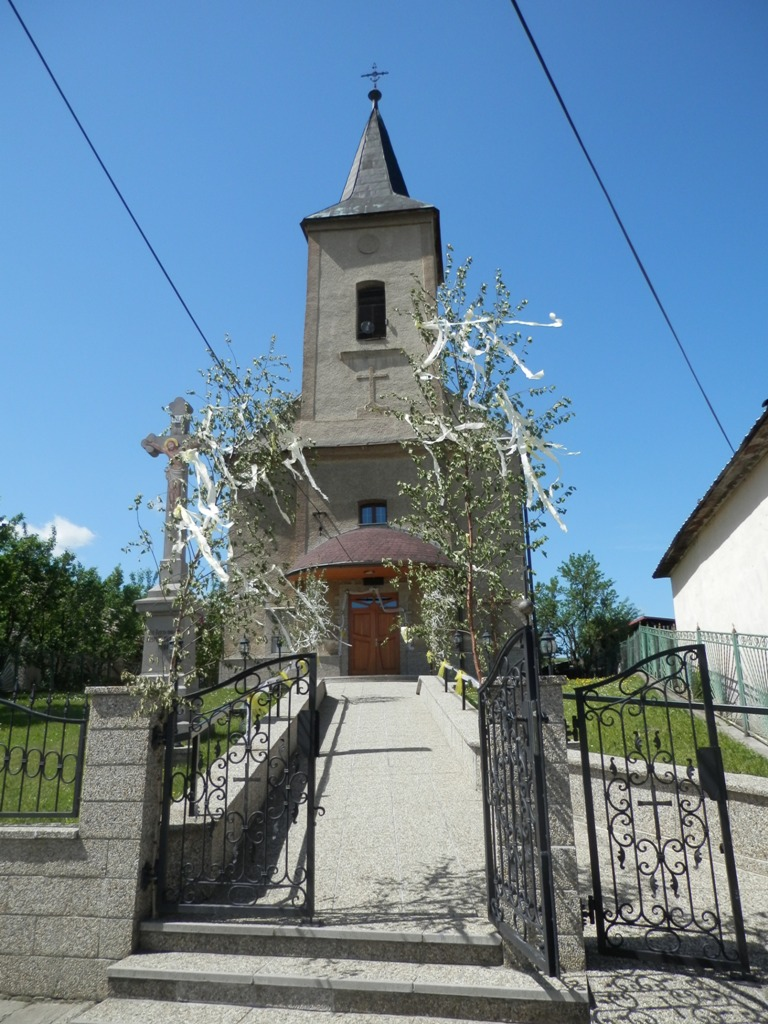

- Flag

- Location of Vislanka in the Prešov Region Location of Vislanka in Slovakia
- Coordinates: 49.23°N 20.87°E
- Country: Slovakia
- Region: Prešov Region
- District: Stará Ľubovňa District
- First mentioned: 1773

Area
  - Total: 4.24 km^{2} (1.64 sq mi)
- Elevation: 542 m (1,778 ft)

Population (2025)
  - Total: 251
- Time zone: UTC+1 (CET)
  - Summer (DST): UTC+2 (CEST)
- Postal code: 654 1
- Area code: +421 52
- Vehicle registration plate (until 2022): SL
- Website: vislanka.sk

Vislanka (Rusyn: Вісланка; Hungarian: Pusztamező) is a village and municipality in Stará Ľubovňa District in the Prešov Region of northern Slovakia.

== History ==
In historical records the village was first mentioned in 1773. Before the establishment of independent Czechoslovakia in 1918, Vislanka was part of Sáros County within the Kingdom of Hungary. From 1939 to 1945, it was part of the Slovak Republic. On 22 January 1945, the Red Army dislodged the Wehrmacht from Vislanka and it was once again part of Czechoslovakia.

== Geography ==
The municipality lies at an altitude of 542 metres (1,778 ft) and covers an area of 4.24 km^{2} (1.64 sq mi) (2025).

== Population ==
Population statistic (10 years)
Year	1995	2005	2015	2025
Count	299	264	264	251
Difference		−11.70%	+0%	−4.92%

Population statistic
Year	2024	2025
Count	258	251
Difference		−2.71%

It has a population of 251 people (31 December 2025).

=== Ethnicity ===
Census 2021 (1+ %)
Ethnicity	Number	Fraction
Slovak	246	92.83%
Rusyn	45	16.98%
Not found out	7	2.64%
Total	265	

In year 2021 was 265 people by ethnicity 246 as Slovak, 45 as Rusyn, 7 as Not found out, 1 as Czech and 1 as Polish.

Note on population: The difference values of population numbers in the table "Population statistic" and in the sections "Ethnicity" & "Religion" is caused by the use of various statistical methods.

=== Religion ===
Census 2021 (1+ %)
Religion	Number	Fraction
Greek Catholic Church	201	75.85%
Roman Catholic Church	43	16.23%
None	12	4.53%
Not found out	8	3.02%
Total	265	

In year 2021 was 265 people by religion 201 from Greek Catholic Church, 43 from Roman Catholic Church, 12 from None, 8 from Not found out and 1 from Other.
