= Lacková =

- Municipality
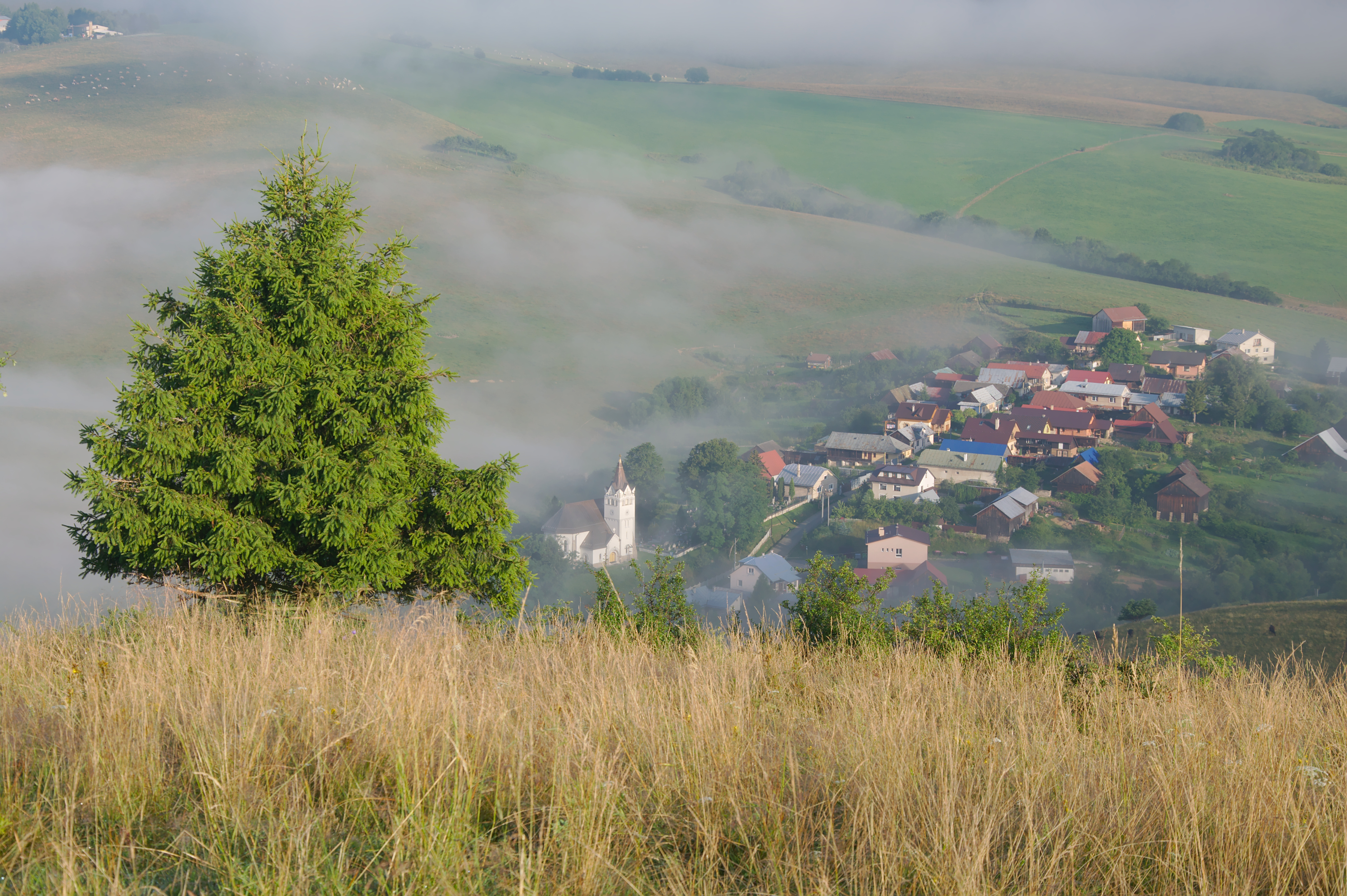

- Flag

- Location of Lacková in the Prešov Region Location of Lacková in Slovakia
- Coordinates: 49.31°N 20.59°E
- Country: Slovakia
- Region: Prešov Region
- District: Stará Ľubovňa District
- First mentioned: 1408

Area
  - Total: 6.16 km^{2} (2.38 sq mi)
- Elevation: 581 m (1,906 ft)

Population (2025)
  - Total: 160
- Time zone: UTC+1 (CET)
  - Summer (DST): UTC+2 (CEST)
- Postal code: 650 1
- Area code: +421 52
- Vehicle registration plate (until 2022): SL
- Website: www.obeclackova.sk

Lacková (Hungarian: Lackvágása, Rusyn: Лацкова) is a village and municipality in Stará Ľubovňa District in the Prešov Region of northern Slovakia.

== History ==
In historical records the village was first mentioned in 1408. Before the establishment of independent Czechoslovakia in 1918, Lacková was part of Szepes County within the Kingdom of Hungary. From 1939 to 1945, it was part of the Slovak Republic. On 24 January 1945, the Red Army dislodged the Wehrmacht from Lacková and it was once again part of Czechoslovakia.

== Geography ==
The municipality lies at an altitude of 581 metres (1,906 ft) and covers an area of 6.16 km^{2} (2.38 sq mi) (2025).

== Population ==
Population statistic (10 years)
Year	1995	2005	2015	2025
Count	172	173	162	160
Difference		+0.58%	−6.35%	−1.23%

Population statistic
Year	2024	2025
Count	164	160
Difference		−2.43%

It has a population of 160 people (31 December 2025).

=== Ethnicity ===
Census 2021 (1+ %)
Ethnicity	Number	Fraction
Slovak	151	98.05%
Not found out	55	35.71%
Polish	2	1.29%
Total	154	

In year 2021 was 154 people by ethnicity 151 as Slovak, 55 as Not found out and 2 as Polish.

Note on population: The difference values of population numbers in the table "Population statistic" and in the sections "Ethnicity" & "Religion" is caused by the use of various statistical methods.

=== Religion ===
Census 2021 (1+ %)
Religion	Number	Fraction
Roman Catholic Church	142	92.21%
None	5	3.25%
Jehovah's Witnesses	3	1.95%
Not found out	3	1.95%
Total	154	

In year 2021 was 154 people by religion 142 from Roman Catholic Church, 5 from None, 3 from Jehovah's Witnesses, 3 from Not found out and 1 from Greek Catholic Church.
