= Nižné Ružbachy =

Village in Slovakia

- Municipality
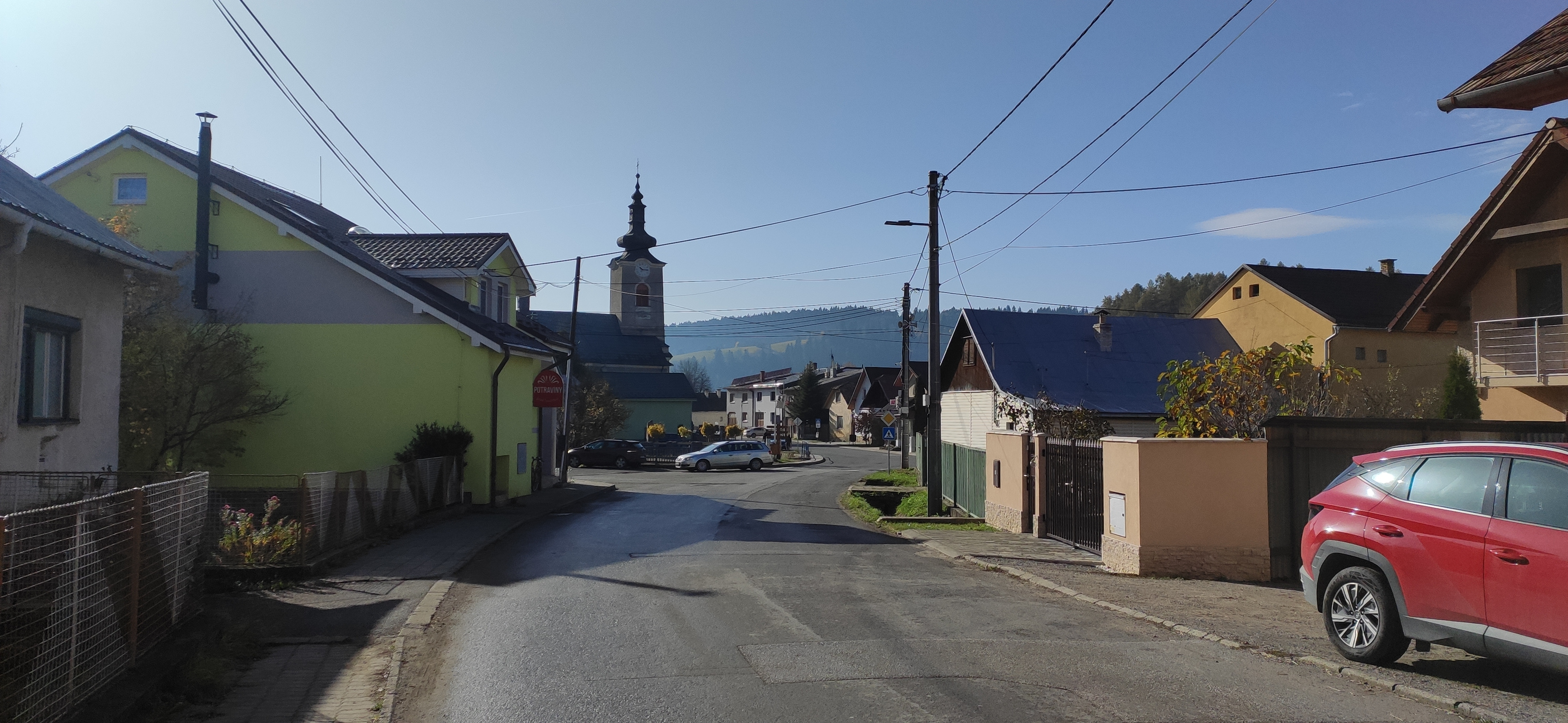

- Flag

- Location of Nižné Ružbachy in the Prešov Region Location of Nižné Ružbachy in Slovakia
- Coordinates: 49.28°N 20.58°E
- Country: Slovakia
- Region: Prešov Region
- District: Stará Ľubovňa District
- First mentioned: 1287

Area
  - Total: 9.79 km^{2} (3.78 sq mi)
- Elevation: 555 m (1,821 ft)

Population (2025)
  - Total: 618
- Time zone: UTC+1 (CET)
  - Summer (DST): UTC+2 (CEST)
- Postal code: 650 2
- Area code: +421 52
- Vehicle registration plate (until 2022): SL
- Website: www.nizneruzbachy.sk

Nižné Ružbachy (Hungarian: Alsózúgó, German: Unterrauschenbach, Polish: Drużbaki Niżne, Rusyn: Нижнї Ружбахы) is a village and municipality in Stará Ľubovňa District in the Prešov Region of northern Slovakia.

== History ==
In historical records the village was first mentioned in 1287. The municipality was founded following the German law by Heinrich from Pudlein and was first mentioned as Rauschenbach. Because of its proximity, the village was part of the estate of the town of Pudlein. In 1412 it was transferred to Poland together with parts of the Spiš County and remained there until 1772.

A paper mill worked in the village from 1755 until the first half of the 19th century. In 1828 there were 120 houses and 880 residents in Nižné Ružbachy.

Before the establishment of independent Czechoslovakia in 1918, Nižné Ružbachy was part of Szepes County within the Kingdom of Hungary. From 1939 to 1945, it was part of the Slovak Republic. On 25 January 1945, the Red Army dislodged the Wehrmacht from Nižné Ružbachy and it was once again part of Czechoslovakia. Since 1993 it is part of independent Slovakia.

=== Name ===
The name of the village throughout history:

- 1287 – Rauschenbach
- 1303 – Rusenbach, Ruzenbach
- 1329 – Antiqua Rusunbach
- 1408 – Antiqua Rausenbach
- 1786 – Ruszbach, Nieder-Rauschenbach
- 1808 – Alsó-Ruszbach, Unter-Rauschenbach, Dolní Rusbachy, Drusbachy
- 1863 – Alsóruszbach
- 1873 – Alsóruzsbach
- 1907 – Alsózúgó
- 1920 – Nižné Družbachy, Družbachy
- 1927 – Nižné Ružbachy

The name in Hungarian is Alsozúgó, the German name is Unterrauschenbach or Niederrauschenbach.

== Geography ==
The municipality lies at an altitude of 555 metres (1,821 ft) and covers an area of 9.79 km^{2} (3.78 sq mi) (2025).

== Population ==
Population statistic (10 years)
Year	1995	2005	2015	2025
Count	653	627	628	618
Difference		−3.98%	+0.15%	−1.59%

Population statistic
Year	2024	2025
Count	622	618
Difference		−0.64%

It has a population of 618 people (31 December 2025).

=== Ethnicity ===
Census 2021 (1+ %)
Ethnicity	Number	Fraction
Slovak	620	99.04%
Not found out	70	11.18%
Total	626	

In year 2021 was 626 people by ethnicity 620 as Slovak, 70 as Not found out, 4 as Rusyn, 3 as Polish, 3 as German, 2 as Czech, 1 as Jewish, 1 as Ukrainian and 1 as Other.

Note on population: The difference values of population numbers in the table "Population statistic" and in the sections "Ethnicity" & "Religion" is caused by the use of various statistical methods.

=== Religion ===
Census 2021 (1+ %)
Religion	Number	Fraction
Roman Catholic Church	573	91.53%
None	29	4.63%
Greek Catholic Church	7	1.12%
Total	626	

In year 2021 was 626 people by religion 573 from Roman Catholic Church, 29 from None, 7 from Greek Catholic Church, 4 from Not found out, 3 from Evangelical Church, 2 from Calvinist Church, 2 from Eastern Orthodox Church, 2 from Ad hoc movements, 1 from Jewish community, 1 from Old Catholic Church, 1 from Christian Congregations in Slovakia and 1 from Buddhism.

According to the 2011 census, 609 residents lived in Nižné Ružbachy, of which 572 were Slovaks and others were Hungarian, Czech and Ukrainian; one resident was of a different ethnicity. 33 residents did not provide any information in this regard. 553 residents professed the Roman Catholic Church, five residents the Greek Catholic Church and one resident the Orthodox Church. 3 residents were non-religious and the denomination of 47 residents was not determined.

== As a municipality ==
The municipality of Nižné Ružbachy lies at an altitude of 555 metres and covers an area of 9.794 km^{2}. It has a population of about 639 people.
