= Hromoš =

Village and municipality in Slovakia

- Municipality
- Flag

- Location of Hromoš in the Prešov Region Location of Hromoš in Slovakia
- Coordinates: 49.25°N 20.80°E
- Country: Slovakia
- Region: Prešov Region
- District: Stará Ľubovňa District
- First mentioned: 1600

Area
  - Total: 13.35 km^{2} (5.15 sq mi)
- Elevation: 532 m (1,745 ft)

Population (2025)
  - Total: 512
- Time zone: UTC+1 (CET)
  - Summer (DST): UTC+2 (CEST)
- Postal code: 654 5
- Area code: +421 52
- Vehicle registration plate (until 2022): SL
- Website: www.hromos.sk

Hromoš (Hungarian: Kormos, until 1899: Gromos, Rusyn: Ґромош, Ukrainian: Громош) is a village and municipality in Stará Ľubovňa District in the Prešov Region of northern Slovakia.

== History ==
In historical records the village was first mentioned in 1600. Before the establishment of independent Czechoslovakia in 1918, Hromoš was part of Sáros County within the Kingdom of Hungary. From 1939 to 1945, it was part of the Slovak Republic. On 23 January 1945, the Red Army dislodged the Wehrmacht from Hromoš and it was once again part of Czechoslovakia.

== Geography ==
The municipality lies at an altitude of 532 metres (1,745 ft) and covers an area of 13.35 km^{2} (5.15 sq mi) (2025).

== Population ==
Population statistic (10 years)
Year	1995	2005	2015	2025
Count	515	524	517	512
Difference		+1.74%	−1.33%	−0.96%

Population statistic
Year	2024	2025
Count	515	512
Difference		−0.58%

It has a population of 512 people (31 December 2025).

=== Ethnicity ===
Census 2021 (1+ %)
Ethnicity	Number	Fraction
Slovak	484	97.18%
Rusyn	35	7.02%
Not found out	8	1.6%
Total	498	

In year 2021 was 498 people by ethnicity 484 as Slovak, 35 as Rusyn, 8 as Not found out, 3 as Other, 2 as Czech, 2 as Ukrainian, 2 as Russian and 1 as Italian.

Note on population: The difference values of population numbers in the table "Population statistic" and in the sections "Ethnicity" & "Religion" is caused by the use of various statistical methods.

=== Religion ===
Census 2021 (1+ %)
Religion	Number	Fraction
Roman Catholic Church	323	64.86%
Greek Catholic Church	141	28.31%
None	22	4.42%
Eastern Orthodox Church	6	1.2%
Not found out	6	1.2%
Total	498	

In year 2021 was 498 people by religion 323 from Roman Catholic Church, 141 from Greek Catholic Church, 22 from None, 6 from Eastern Orthodox Church and 6 from Not found out.

== Genealogical resources ==
The records for genealogical research are available at the state archive "Statny Archiv in Presov, Slovakia"

- Roman Catholic church records (births/marriages/deaths): 1686-1924 (parish B)
- Greek Catholic church records (births/marriages/deaths): 1822-1903 (parish B)

== See also ==
- List of municipalities and towns in Slovakia
