= Obručné =

- Municipality
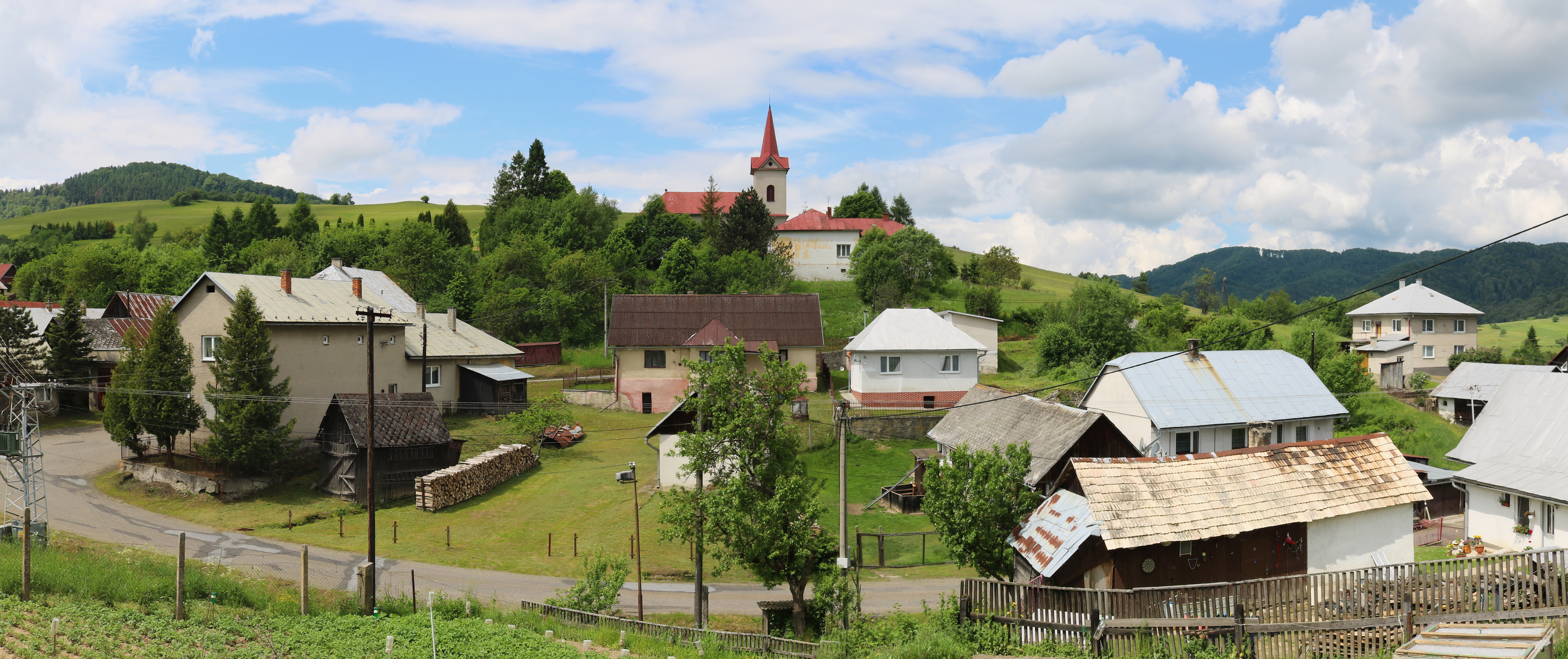
- View of Obručné

- Flag

- Location of Obručné in the Prešov Region Location of Obručné in Slovakia
- Coordinates: 49.30°N 20.98°E
- Country: Slovakia
- Region: Prešov Region
- District: Stará Ľubovňa District
- First mentioned: 1656

Area
  - Total: 5.86 km^{2} (2.26 sq mi)
- Elevation: 647 m (2,123 ft)

Population (2025)
  - Total: 33
- Time zone: UTC+1 (CET)
  - Summer (DST): UTC+2 (CEST)
- Postal code: 654 2
- Area code: +421 52
- Vehicle registration plate (until 2022): SL

Obručné (Rusyn: Обручне; Hungarian: Abroncsos) is a village and municipality in Stará Ľubovňa District in the Prešov Region of northern Slovakia.

== History ==
In historical records the village was first mentioned in 1656. Before the establishment of independent Czechoslovakia in 1918, Obručné was part of Sáros County within the Kingdom of Hungary. From 1939 to 1945, it was part of the Slovak Republic. On 21 January 1945, the Red Army dislodged the Wehrmacht from Obručné and it was once again part of Czechoslovakia.

== Geography ==
The municipality lies at an altitude of 647 metres (2,123 ft) and covers an area of 5.86 km^{2} (2.26 sq mi) (2025).

== Population ==
Population statistic (10 years)
Year	1995	2005	2015	2025
Count	75	49	31	33
Difference		−34.66%	−36.73%	+6.45%

Population statistic
Year	2024	2025
Count	33	33
Difference		+0%

It has a population of 33 people (31 December 2025).

=== Ethnicity ===
Census 2021 (1+ %)
Ethnicity	Number	Fraction
Slovak	21	80.76%
Rusyn	15	57.69%
Total	26	

In year 2021 was 26 people by ethnicity 21 as Slovak and 15 as Rusyn.

Note on population: The difference values of population numbers in the table "Population statistic" and in the sections "Ethnicity" & "Religion" is caused by the use of various statistical methods.

=== Religion ===
Census 2021 (1+ %)
Religion	Number	Fraction
Greek Catholic Church	22	84.62%
Roman Catholic Church	4	15.38%
Total	26	

In year 2021 was 26 people by religion 22 from Greek Catholic Church and 4 from Roman Catholic Church.
