= Kolačkov =

Municipality of Slovakia

- Municipality
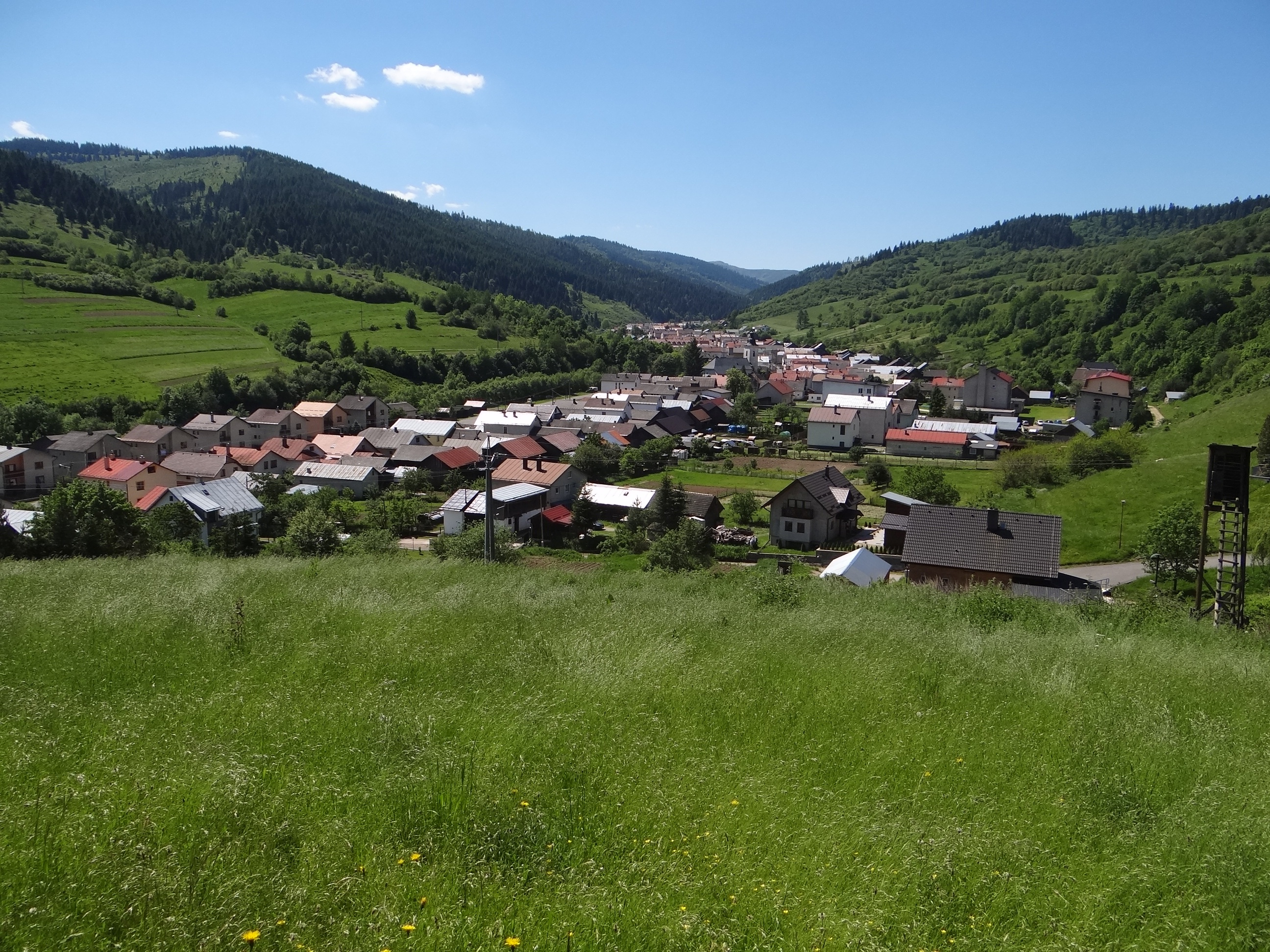

- Flag

- Location of Kolačkov in the Prešov Region Location of Kolačkov in Slovakia
- Coordinates: 49.27°N 20.63°E
- Country: Slovakia
- Region: Prešov Region
- District: Stará Ľubovňa District
- First mentioned: 1361

Area
  - Total: 8.67 km^{2} (3.35 sq mi)
- Elevation: 649 m (2,129 ft)

Population (2025)
  - Total: 1,282
- Time zone: UTC+1 (CET)
  - Summer (DST): UTC+2 (CEST)
- Postal code: 651 1
- Area code: +421 52
- Vehicle registration plate (until 2022): SL
- Website: www.kolackov.sk

Kolačkov (Hungarian: Kalács, Rusyn: Колачков) is a village and municipality in Stará Ľubovňa District in the Prešov Region of northern Slovakia.

== History ==
In historical records the village was first mentioned in 1361. Before the establishment of independent Czechoslovakia in 1918, Kolačkov was part of Szepes County within the Kingdom of Hungary. From 1939 to 1945, it was part of the Slovak Republic. On 24 January 1945, the Red Army dislodged the Wehrmacht from Kolačkov and it was once again part of Czechoslovakia.

== Geography ==
The municipality lies at an altitude of 649 metres (2,129 ft) and covers an area of 8.67 km^{2} (3.35 sq mi) (2025).

== Population ==
Population statistic (10 years)
Year	1995	2005	2015	2025
Count	954	1064	1311	1282
Difference		+11.53%	+23.21%	−2.21%

Population statistic
Year	2024	2025
Count	1281	1282
Difference		+0.07%

It has a population of 1282 people (31 December 2025).

=== Ethnicity ===
Census 2021 (1+ %)
Ethnicity	Number	Fraction
Slovak	1255	99.13%
Romani	390	30.8%
Not found out	363	28.67%
Rusyn	14	1.1%
Total	1266	

In year 2021 was 1266 people by ethnicity 1255 as Slovak, 390 as Romani, 363 as Not found out, 14 as Rusyn, 5 as Polish, 2 as German, 1 as Czech, 1 as Italian, 1 as Austrian and 1 as Hungarian.

Note on population: The difference values of population numbers in the table "Population statistic" and in the sections "Ethnicity" & "Religion" is caused by the use of various statistical methods.

=== Religion ===
Census 2021 (1+ %)
Religion	Number	Fraction
Roman Catholic Church	1204	95.1%
Greek Catholic Church	40	3.16%
None	15	1.18%
Total	1266	

In year 2021 was 1266 people by religion 1204 from Roman Catholic Church, 40 from Greek Catholic Church, 15 from None, 2 from Not found out, 2 from Other, 2 from Evangelical Church and 1 from Eastern Orthodox Church.

== Genealogical resources ==
The records for genealogical research are available at the state archive "Statny Archiv in Levoca, Slovakia"

- Roman Catholic church records (births/marriages/deaths): 1742-1912 (parish A)
- Greek Catholic church records (births/marriages/deaths): 1855-1873 (parish B)

== See also ==
- List of municipalities and towns in Slovakia
