= Údol =

Village and municipality in Slovakia

- Municipality
- Flag

- Location of Údol in the Prešov Region Location of Údol in Slovakia
- Coordinates: 49.29°N 20.81°E
- Country: Slovakia
- Region: Prešov Region
- District: Stará Ľubovňa District
- First mentioned: 1427

Government
  - Mayor: Vladimír Kravec (Ind.)

Area
  - Total: 13.07 km^{2} (5.05 sq mi)
- Elevation: 519 m (1,703 ft)

Population (2025)
  - Total: 374
- Time zone: UTC+1 (CET)
  - Summer (DST): UTC+2 (CEST)
- Postal code: 654 5
- Area code: +421 52
- Vehicle registration plate (until 2022): SL
- Website: www.obecudol.sk

Údol (Hungarian: Sárosújlak, Rusyn: Удол) is a village and municipality in Stará Ľubovňa District in the Prešov Region of northern Slovakia.

== History ==
Údol is a predominantly ethnic Carpatho-Rusyn Greek Catholic village located in the former Saros County of the Austro-Hungarian Empire in present-day Stara Lubovna District of the Slovak Republic. In 1427 the village was named Wyak which later evolved into Újak. This name was changed by the Communist Government takeover in 1948 to Údol. The village of Údol is still referred to as Újak by residents to the present day. The Greek Catholic Church of Saint Dimitry, the Martyr was built in the year 1866, and remodeled in 1888 and 1943. Before 1866 there was a wooden church at a location below the existing church. Before the establishment of independent Czechoslovakia in 1918, Údol was part of Sáros County within the Kingdom of Hungary. From 1939 to 1945, it was part of the Slovak Republic. On 23 January 1945, the Red Army dislodged the Wehrmacht from Údol and it was once again part of Czechoslovakia.

== Important people ==
- Irina Nevická (* 1886 – † 1966), Ukraine writer
- Patrik Pružinský, economist, OECD

== Geography ==
The municipality lies at an altitude of 519 metres (1,703 ft) and covers an area of 13.07 km^{2} (5.05 sq mi) (2025).

== Population ==
Population statistic (10 years)
Year	1995	2005	2015	2025
Count	456	424	388	374
Difference		−7.01%	−8.49%	−3.60%

Population statistic
Year	2024	2025
Count	367	374
Difference		+1.90%

It has a population of 374 people (31 December 2025).

=== Ethnicity ===
Census 2021 (1+ %)
Ethnicity	Number	Fraction
Slovak	270	72.77%
Rusyn	230	61.99%
Ukrainian	13	3.5%
Not found out	6	1.61%
Total	371	

In year 2021 was 371 people by ethnicity 270 as Slovak, 230 as Rusyn, 13 as Ukrainian, 6 as Not found out, 2 as Serbian, 2 as Polish, 1 as Hungarian and 1 as Other.

Note on population: The difference values of population numbers in the table "Population statistic" and in the sections "Ethnicity" & "Religion" is caused by the use of various statistical methods.

=== Religion ===
Census 2021 (1+ %)
Religion	Number	Fraction
Greek Catholic Church	294	79.25%
Roman Catholic Church	38	10.24%
Eastern Orthodox Church	25	6.74%
None	13	3.5%
Total	371	

In year 2021 was 371 people by religion 294 from Greek Catholic Church, 38 from Roman Catholic Church, 25 from Eastern Orthodox Church, 13 from None and 1 from Not found out.
