= Starina, Stará Ľubovňa District =

Starina
- Municipality
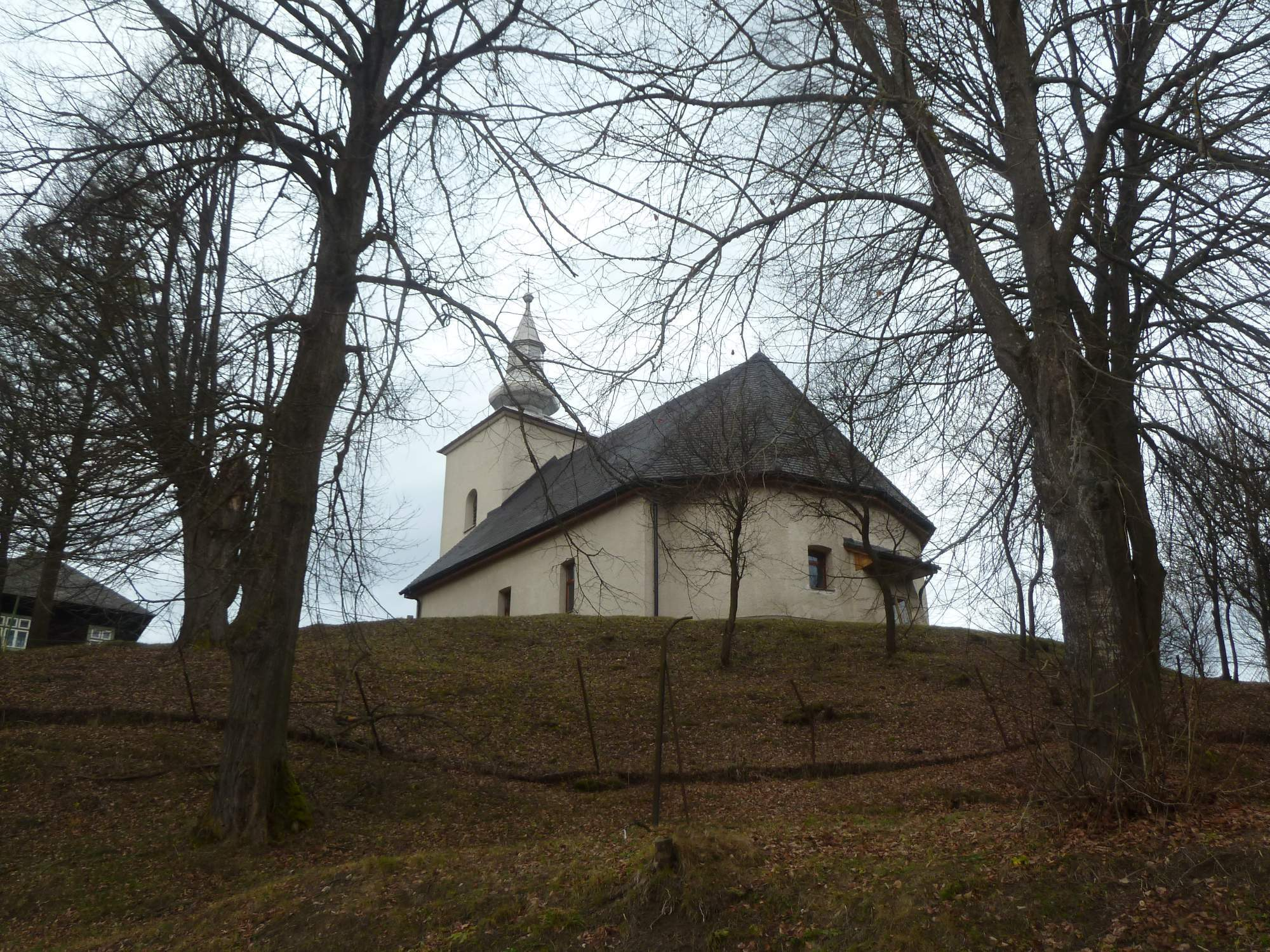

- Flag

- Location of Starina in the Prešov Region Location of Starina in Slovakia
- Coordinates: 49.33°N 20.83°E
- Country: Slovakia
- Region: Prešov Region
- District: Stará Ľubovňa District
- First mentioned: 1352

Area
  - Total: 9.15 km^{2} (3.53 sq mi)
- Elevation: 466 m (1,529 ft)

Population (2025)
  - Total: 50
- Time zone: UTC+1 (CET)
  - Summer (DST): UTC+2 (CEST)
- Postal code: 654 6
- Area code: +421 52
- Vehicle registration plate (until 2022): SL
- Website: www.starina.sk

Starina (Hungarian: Poprádófalu, Rusyn: Старина) is a village and municipality in Stará Ľubovňa District in the Prešov Region of northern Slovakia.

== History ==
In historical records the village was first mentioned in 1352. Before the establishment of independent Czechoslovakia in 1918, Starina was part of Sáros County within the Kingdom of Hungary. From 1939 to 1945, it was part of the Slovak Republic. On 24 January 1945, the Red Army dislodged the Wehrmacht from Starina and it was once again part of Czechoslovakia.

== Geography ==
The municipality lies at an altitude of 466 metres (1,529 ft) and covers an area of 9.15 km^{2} (3.53 sq mi) (2025).

== Population ==
Population statistic (10 years)
Year	1995	2005	2015	2025
Count	103	65	42	50
Difference		−36.89%	−35.38%	+19.04%

Population statistic
Year	2024	2025
Count	51	50
Difference		−1.96%

It has a population of 50 people (31 December 2025).

=== Ethnicity ===
Census 2021 (1+ %)
Ethnicity	Number	Fraction
Slovak	42	80.76%
Rusyn	21	40.38%
Not found out	3	5.76%
Total	52	

In year 2021 was 52 people by ethnicity 42 as Slovak, 21 as Rusyn and 3 as Not found out.

Note on population: The difference values of population numbers in the table "Population statistic" and in the sections "Ethnicity" & "Religion" is caused by the use of various statistical methods.

=== Religion ===
Census 2021 (1+ %)
Religion	Number	Fraction
Greek Catholic Church	32	61.54%
Roman Catholic Church	8	15.38%
None	6	11.54%
Evangelical Church	4	7.69%
Not found out	2	3.85%
Total	52	

In year 2021 was 52 people by religion 32 from Greek Catholic Church, 8 from Roman Catholic Church, 6 from None, 4 from Evangelical Church and 2 from Not found out.
