= Kremná =

Village and municipality in Slovakia

- Municipality
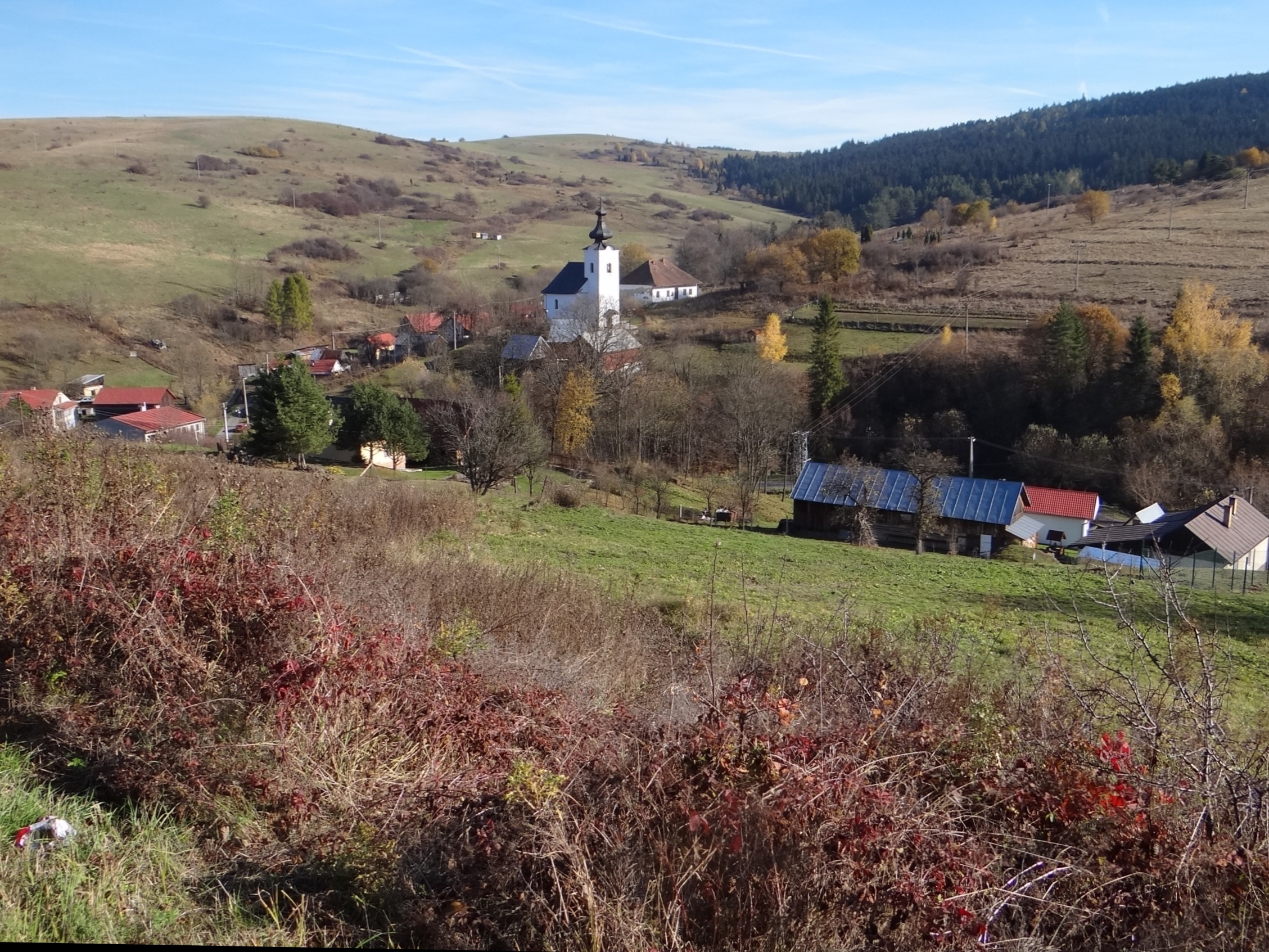

- Flag

- Location of Kremná in the Prešov Region Location of Kremná in Slovakia
- Coordinates: 49.35°N 20.70°E
- Country: Slovakia
- Region: Prešov Region
- District: Stará Ľubovňa District
- First mentioned: 1773

Area
  - Total: 4.14 km^{2} (1.60 sq mi)
- Elevation: 599 m (1,965 ft)

Population (2025)
  - Total: 99
- Time zone: UTC+1 (CET)
  - Summer (DST): UTC+2 (CEST)
- Postal code: 652 1
- Area code: +421 52
- Vehicle registration plate (until 2022): SL
- Website: kremna.sk

Kremná (Hungarian: Lublókorompa, Rusyn: Кремна) is a village and municipality in Stará Ľubovňa District in the Prešov Region of northern Slovakia.

== History ==
In historical records the village was first mentioned in 1773. Before the establishment of independent Czechoslovakia in 1918, Kremná was part of Szepes County within the Kingdom of Hungary. From 1939 to 1945, it was part of the Slovak Republic.

== Geography ==
The municipality lies at an altitude of 599 metres (1,965 ft) and covers an area of 4.14 km^{2} (1.60 sq mi) (2025).

== Population ==
Population statistic (10 years)
Year	1995	2005	2015	2025
Count	139	111	97	99
Difference		−20.14%	−12.61%	+2.06%

Population statistic
Year	2024	2025
Count	98	99
Difference		+1.02%

It has a population of 99 people (31 December 2025).

=== Ethnicity ===
Census 2021 (1+ %)
Ethnicity	Number	Fraction
Slovak	92	97.87%
Rusyn	52	55.31%
Total	94	

In year 2021 was 94 people by ethnicity 92 as Slovak and 52 as Rusyn.

Note on population: The difference values of population numbers in the table "Population statistic" and in the sections "Ethnicity" & "Religion" is caused by the use of various statistical methods.

=== Religion ===
Census 2021 (1+ %)
Religion	Number	Fraction
Greek Catholic Church	79	84.04%
Roman Catholic Church	11	11.7%
None	3	3.19%
Calvinist Church	1	1.06%
Total	94	

In year 2021 was 94 people by religion 79 from Greek Catholic Church, 11 from Roman Catholic Church, 3 from None and 1 from Calvinist Church.
