= Poland–Slovakia border =

International border

- Map of the Beskid Mountains straddling the Poland–Slovakia border

Characteristics
- Entities: Poland Slovakia
- Length: 541 kilometres (336 mi)

History
- Established: 1 January 1993
- Current shape: 23 July 2005

The international border between Poland and Slovakia and has formally existed since 1 January 1993, following the dissolution of Czechoslovakia into two independent states. Before the dissolution of Czechoslovakia, its eastern border with Poland was practically identical to the present-day border between Poland and Slovakia, with minor corrections made in later years. The length of the Poland–Slovakia border is 541 kilometres (336 mi)

== Course of the border ==
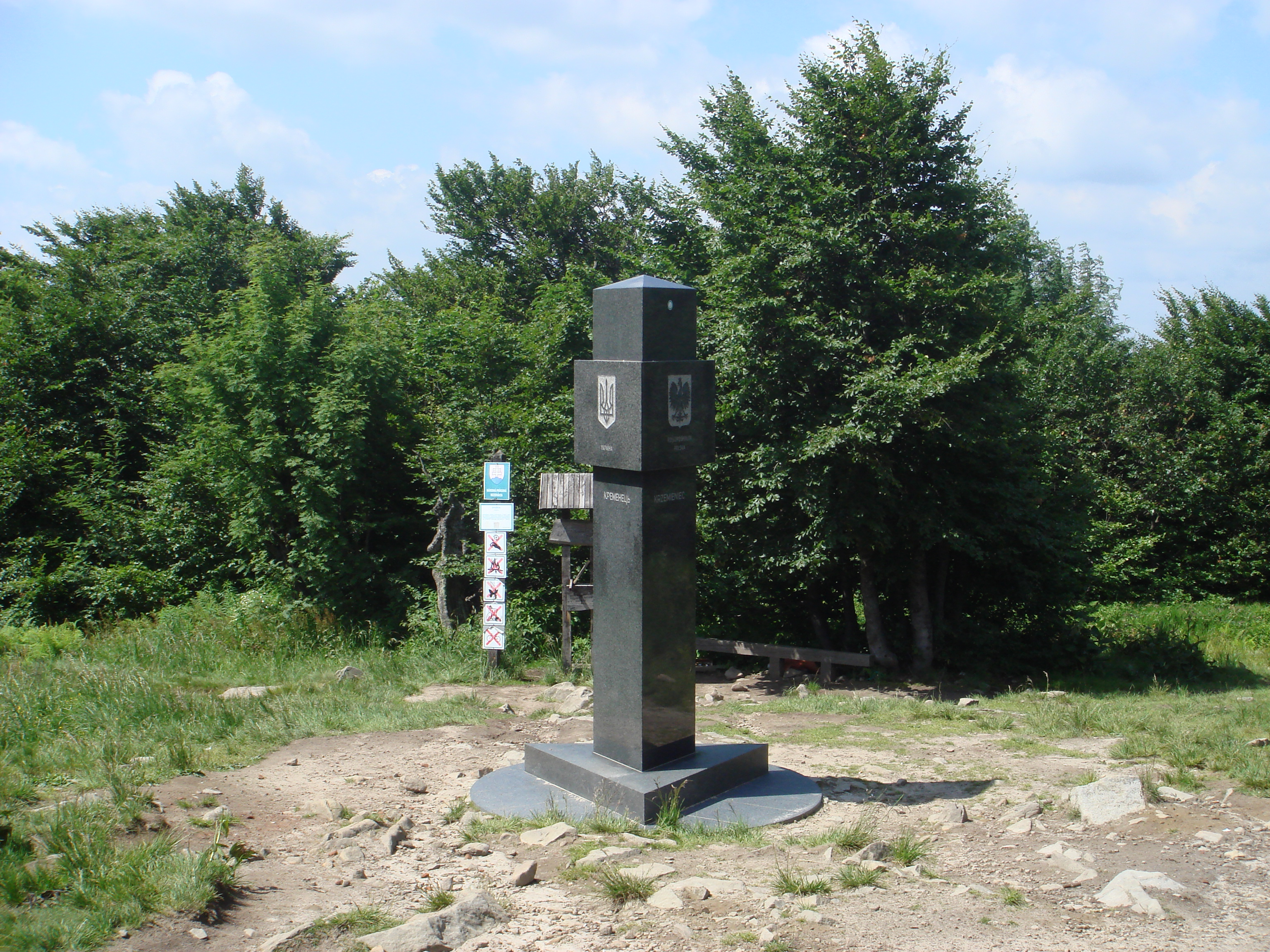
Tripoint of Slovakia, Ukraine and Poland.

The border with Slovakia runs from Jaworzynka Trzycatek through the Zwardońska Pass, Wielka Racza, Wielki Rycea, the Glinka Pass, Pilsko, Babia Góra, Chyżne, crosses the Orava valley, the main ridge of the Tatra Mountains, runs along the Białka valley, along the Dunajec valley, through the Pieniny Mountains, the Poprad valley, through Muszyna, the Tylicka Pass, the Dukla Pass and the Łupków Pass, to the Uzhok pass.

== History ==
=== First border ===
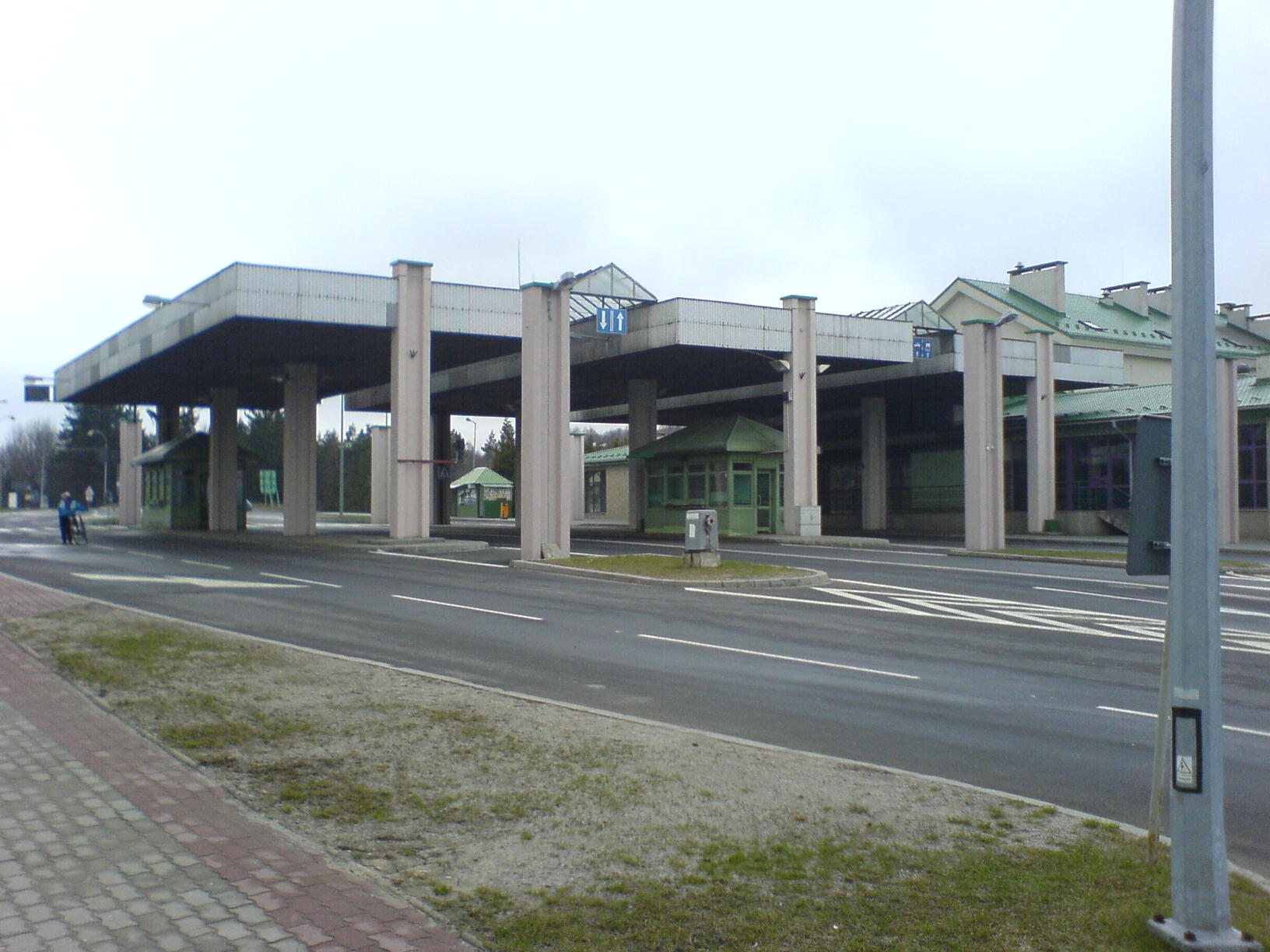
Disused Poland–Slovakia border crossing near Barwinek, Poland on European route E371. Photo taken in April 2008, after Poland and Slovakia joined the Schengen Area.

The first Poland-Slovakia border was established on 14 March 1939, when the Slovak Republic was created. It began 550 metres (1,800 ft) west of the Mały Połom mountain (Trojačka) at 1,058 metres (3,471 ft) above sea level, then ran east through the Vel mountain, Polom Mountain at 1,067 metres (3,501 ft) above sea level, south of the Jablunkov Pass, north of Czacy and Czarna, then through Wielka Racza, Pilsko, Babia Góra, Chyżne, crossed the Orava valley and the main ridge of the Tatra Mountains. Then it ran through the Białka valley along the Dunajec Valley, through the Pieniny Mountains, through the Poprad valley, through Muszyna and ended its course at the top of Czernin (Černina) at 929 metres (3,048 ft) above sea level in the vicinity of Łupków pass, where the tripartite borders of the Second Polish Republic, the Slovak Republic and the Kingdom of Hungary were located.

=== World War II ===
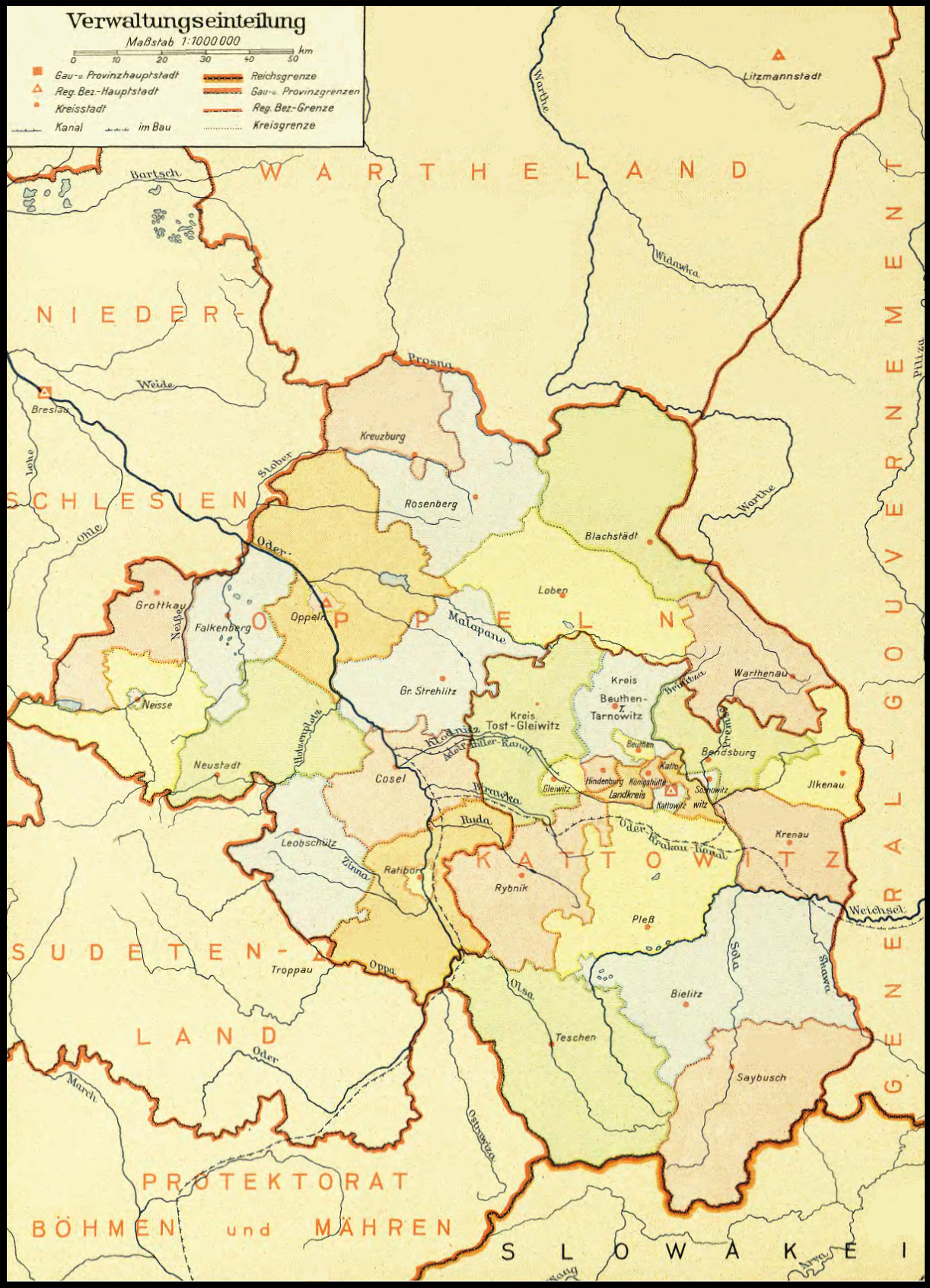
Map of expanded Upper Silesia 1941-1945.

On 8 October 1939, the Poland-Slovakia border shrank due to Nazi Germany expanding Upper Silesia into Zaolzie and parts of Poland. On 12 October the Poland-Slovakia border formally became the General Government-Slovakia border. On 24 November 1939, the border changed once again as Slovakia annexed (going from West to East) the Skalité territories; the northern part of Oravská Polhora including the mountain peak of Jalovec; the northern parts of Trstená and Bobrov; northeastern Orava with Jabłonka; Hladovka and Sucha Hora; Tatranská Javorina and some lakes southwest of it; northwestern Spiš with Nowa Biała; an islet in Dunajec in Červený Kláštor and Majere; Lesnica; part of Poprad and the bank near its bend in Gmina Piwniczna-Zdrój, west of the small river of Wierchomlanka; a part of a local forest on the west side of Poprad in the east side of Sulín; territory up to Poprad in Sulín and Malý Lipník; a bank on Poprad, slightly south of Andrzejówka and another one slightly further east and a third one immediately northwest of Legnava, across Poprad; the northern part of Cigeľka; the northern part of the eastern salient of Osadné.

=== The Cold War ===
After World War II, the de facto border became the pre-WWII border with slight alterations. The newly created Polish People’s Republic and Czechoslovak Socialist Republic both claimed their own border but were restrained to conflict due to their status in the Warsaw Pact. These disputes were formally resolved on 13 June 1958, when the two sides signed an agreement solving border disputes.

=== 2002 adjustment ===
On 29 July 2002, in the city of Stará Ľubovňa, the Republic of Poland and the Slovak Republic agreed to exchange minor border territories to address practical border issues, but the exchange only happened officially on 17 October 2005. In total, Poland and Slovakia exchanged territories covering 2,969 m².

Near a local observation tower on the Dukla Pass, in the area of the Polish town of Barwinek and the Slovakian town of Vyšný Komárnik, Slovakia ceded 376 m² of territory to Poland, while Poland ceded an area equivalent in size elsewhere. This change was needed in order to restore a common border road, built in 1958, which allowed Slovak tourists to visit historic battle sites. After the correction, the border runs along the middle of the road.

Another adjustment occurred along the Dunajec River, near the Polish towns of Sromowce Niżne and Sromowce Wyżne and the Slovak towns of Červený Kláštor and Spišská Stará Ves. A part of a 2289 m² unnamed islet was transferred from Poland to Slovakia, while Slovakia ceded an equal area of the islet of Nokiel to Poland. This exchange was needed to adjust the border according to the changing islets.

Finally, in the region of the Polish town of Jaworzynka and the Slovakian town of Skalité, Poland relinquished 304 m² of land, with Slovakia transferring the same area in return. This adjustment was made in response to residents' requests, as a road built after 1953 had crossed the border multiple times, causing significant access difficulties to plots on both sides. The border now runs along the middle of this road.

== See also ==
- Territorial changes of Poland
- Border Guard (Poland)
- Extreme points of Poland
- Geography of Poland
- Poland-Slovakia relations
- Polish rail border crossings
