= Červený Kláštor =

- Municipality
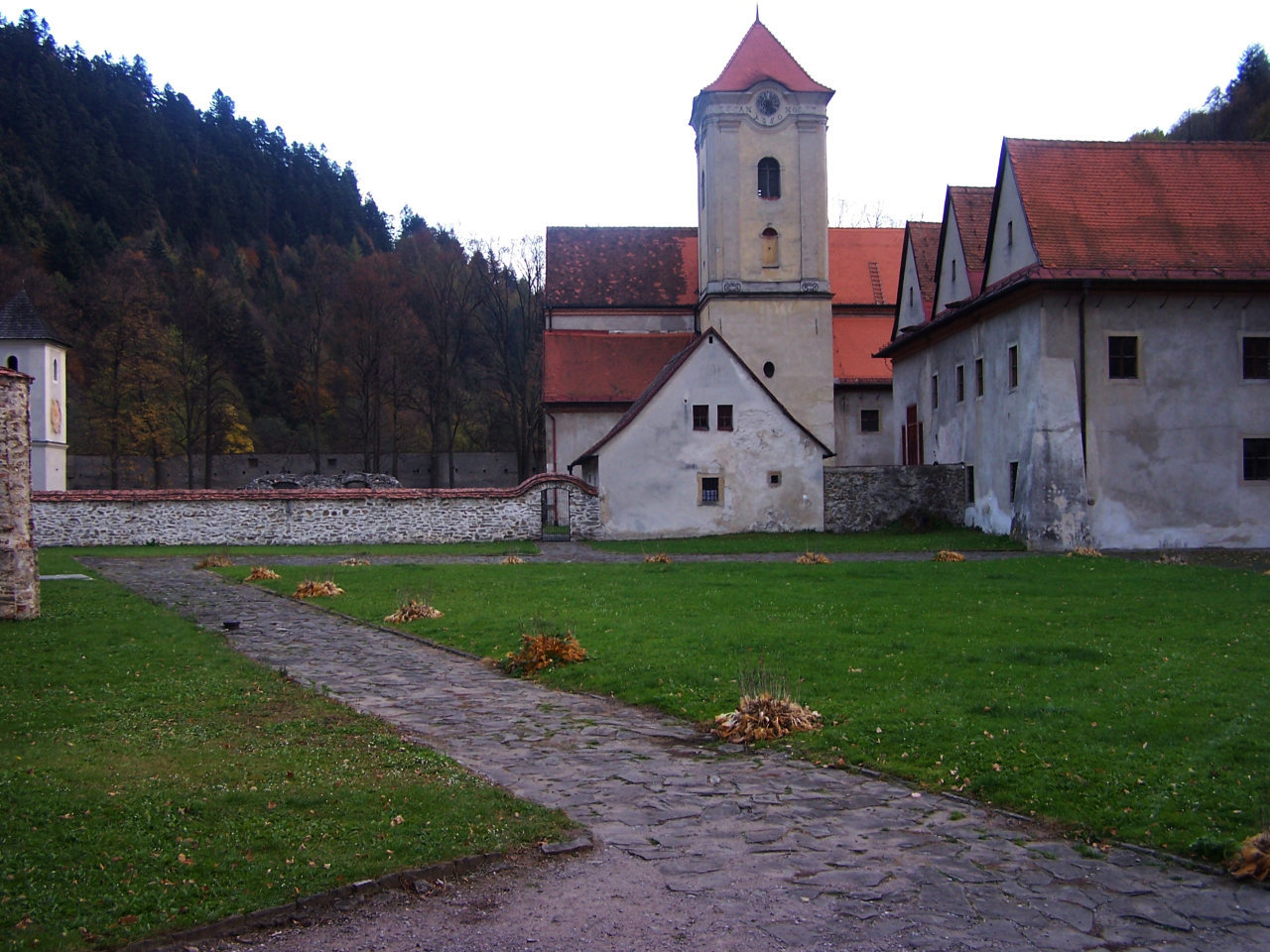
- Červený Kláštor (Monastery)

- Flag

- Location of Červený Kláštor in the Prešov Region Location of Červený Kláštor in Slovakia
- Coordinates: 49.40°N 20.42°E
- Country: Slovakia
- Region: Prešov Region
- District: Kežmarok District
- First mentioned: 1828

Area
  - Total: 3.01 km^{2} (1.16 sq mi)
- Elevation: 462 m (1,516 ft)

Population (2025)
  - Total: 219
- Time zone: UTC+1 (CET)
  - Summer (DST): UTC+2 (CEST)
- Postal code: 590 6
- Area code: +421 52
- Vehicle registration plate (until 2022): KK
- Website: www.cervenyklastor.sk/domains/cervenyklastor.sk/

Červený Kláštor (Slovak pronunciation: [ˈtʂerʋeniː ˈklaːʂtɔr], Hungarian: Alsólehnic, Goral: Švaby, Rusyn: Червені Клаштор) (lit. 'red monastery') is a small village and municipality in the far north Kežmarok District in the Prešov Region of northern Slovakia, near the Polish border, in the Zamagurie region.

== History ==
A Camaldolese monastery was established on this location, then part of the Habsburg-ruled Kingdom of Hungary, in 1710.

In 1782, it was secularized as part of Emperor Joseph II's campaign against monastic orders that, in his view, didn't pursue useful activities. The monastery building still exists however (see photo).

The present village was founded in 1828. Before the establishment of independent Czechoslovakia in 1918, Červený Kláštor was part of Szepes County within the Kingdom of Hungary. From 1939 to 1945, it was part of the Slovak Republic. On 26 January 1945, the Red Army dislodged the Wehrmacht from Červený Kláštor and it was once again part of Czechoslovakia.

== Geography ==
The municipality lies at an altitude of 462 metres (1,516 ft) and covers an area of 3.01 km^{2} (1.16 sq mi) (2025). It lies 8 km east of the centre of Zamagurie region, Spišská Stará Ves. The governing body of the Pieniny national park is located in the village. Dunajec river, which makes border with Poland, flows near the village. It is used for tourist purposes for rafting. Other attractions in or near the village include the Červený kláštor (spelled with a lower-case "k"; literally Red Monastery) or walking in the surrounding mountains of Pieniny. Since 2006, there is a new bridge for pedestrians in operation, connecting Červený Kláštor and Sromowce Niżne.

== Population ==
Population statistic (10 years)
Year	1995	2005	2015	2025
Count	240	219	234	219
Difference		−8.75%	+6.84%	−6.41%

Population statistic
Year	2024	2025
Count	220	219
Difference		−0.45%

It has a population of 219 people (31 December 2025).

=== Ethnicity ===
Census 2021 (1+ %)
Ethnicity	Number	Fraction
Slovak	218	99.54%
Not found out	41	18.72%
Polish	3	1.36%
Total	219	

In year 2021 was 219 people by ethnicity 218 as Slovak, 41 as Not found out, 3 as Polish, 1 as Czech and 1 as Other.

Note on population: The difference values of population numbers in the table "Population statistic" and in the sections "Ethnicity" & "Religion" is caused by the use of various statistical methods.

=== Religion ===
Census 2021 (1+ %)
Religion	Number	Fraction
Roman Catholic Church	182	83.11%
None	25	11.42%
Evangelical Church	6	2.74%
Greek Catholic Church	5	2.28%
Total	219	

In year 2021 was 219 people by religion 182 from Roman Catholic Church, 25 from None, 6 from Evangelical Church, 5 from Greek Catholic Church and 1 from Not found out.

== Gallery ==
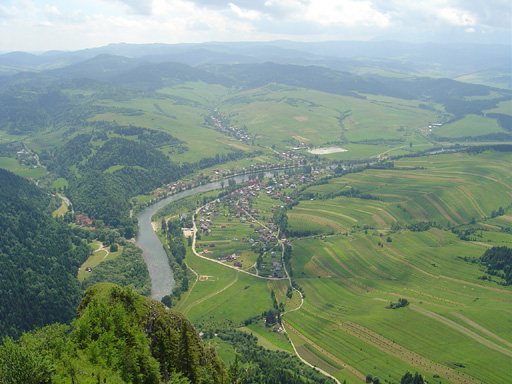
View of the village from the Polish Trzy Korony

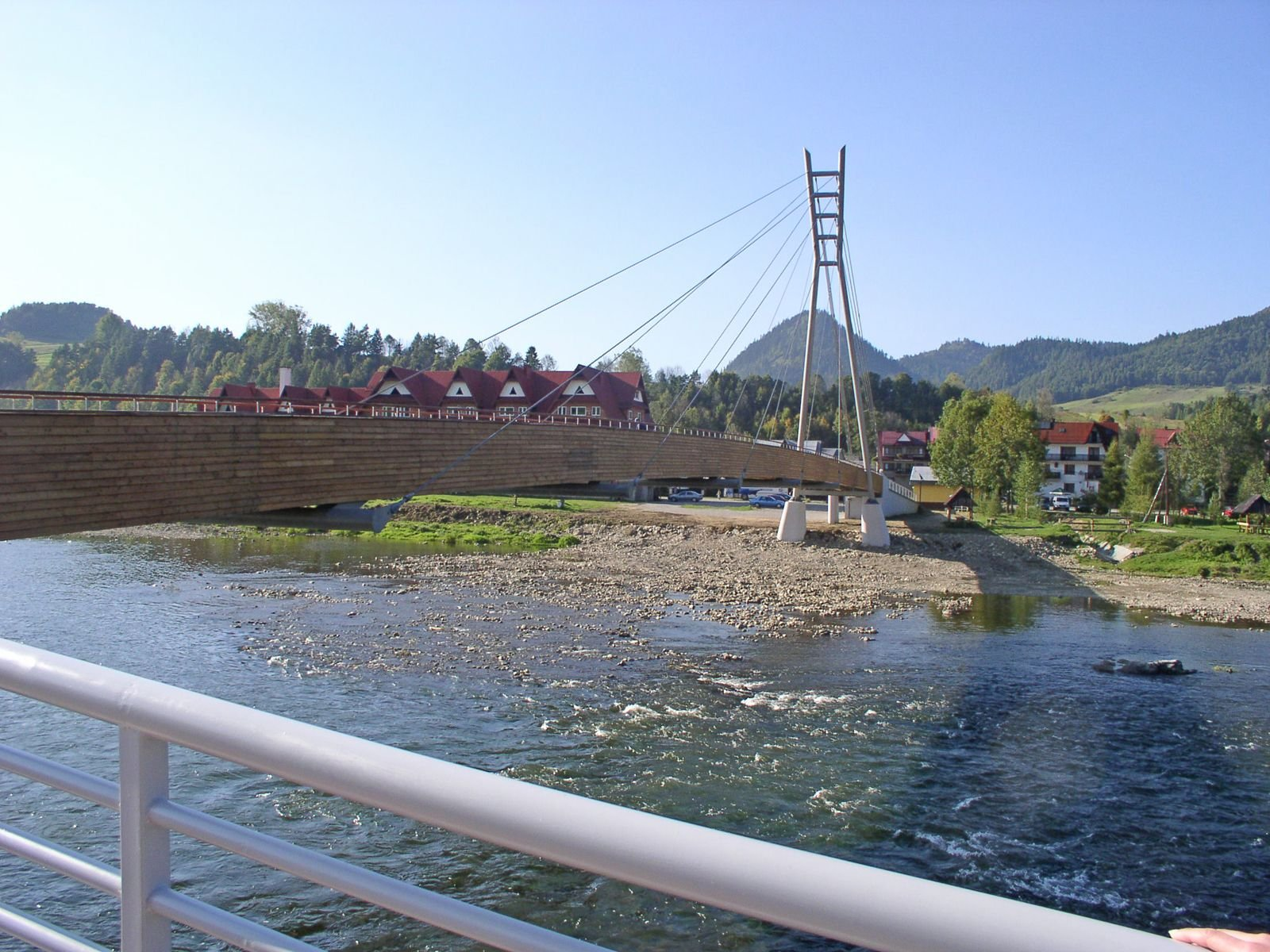
Pedestrian bridge between Červený Kláštor and Sromowce Niżne in Poland

== Genealogical resources ==
The records for genealogical research are available at the state archive "Statny Archiv in Levoča, Slovakia"

- Roman Catholic church records (births/marriages/deaths): 1766-1832 (parish B)
- Lutheran church records (births/marriages/deaths): 1809-1920 (parish B)

== See also ==
- List of municipalities and towns in Slovakia
