= Zamagurie =

Coordinates: 49.3°N 20.4°E

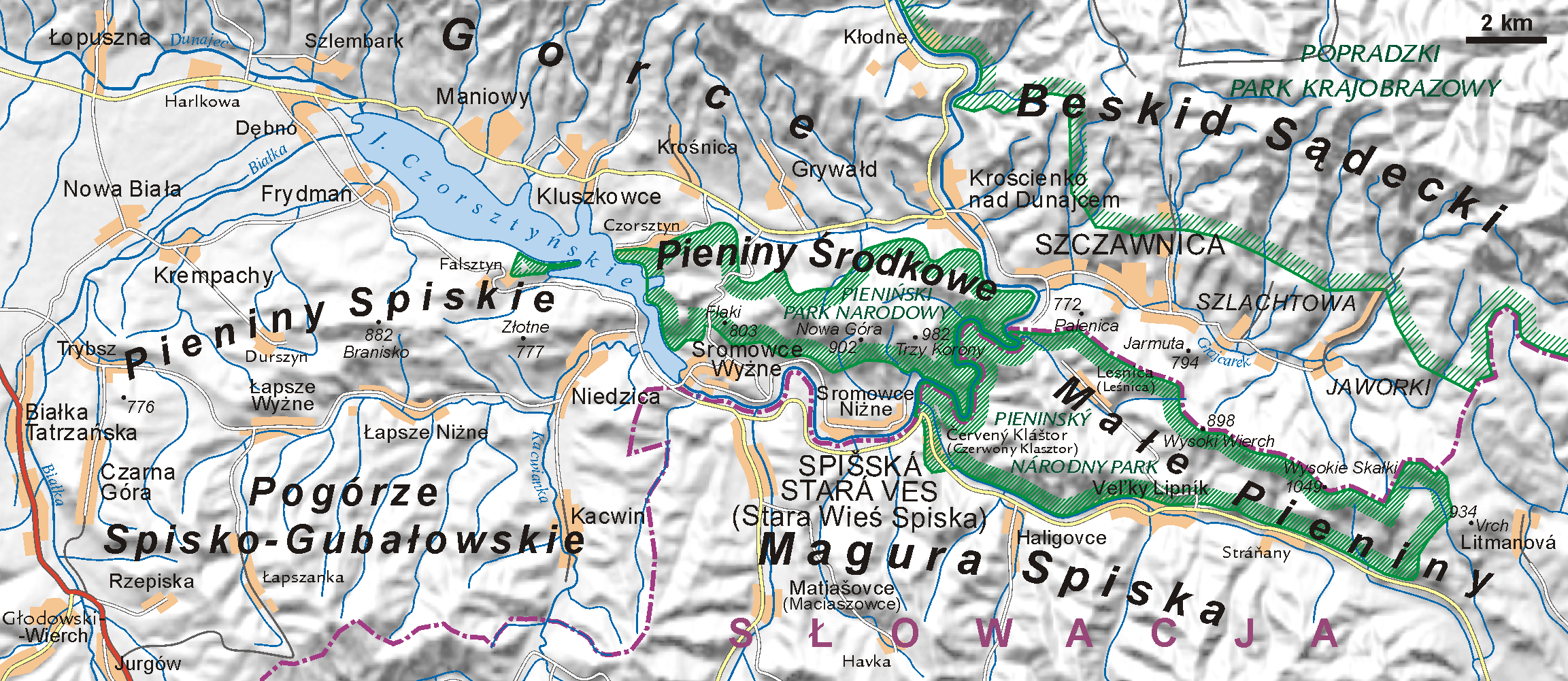
Zamagurie region with Dunajec river in Pieniny Środkowe range (Slovak: Centrálne Pieniny) to the north, and Magura Spišská to the south, with Spišská Stará Ves (center) on the border between Poland and Slovakia

Zamagurie (in Slovak, pronounced [ˈzamaɡurɪe]; Polish: Zamagurze) is a region in the Goral Lands area in the north of the Spiš region, between the Spišská Magura in the south, the Dunajec river in the north and the Białka (Slovak: Biela voda) river in the west. It is divided between the Prešov Region of Slovakia and the Lesser Poland Voivodeship of Poland and is further divided between the Slovak districts of Stará Ľubovňa and Kežmarok and Polish gminas of Bukowina Tatrzańska, Nowy Targ and Łapsze Niżne. The centre of the region is the Slovak town Spišská Stará Ves, which is just near the border. The region also used to be one of the official tourist regions of Slovakia until 2004.

In 2006, a new border bridge for pedestrians was open between Červený Kláštor and Sromowce.

== Tourist attractions ==
The most popular tourist attraction are the Pieniny mountains with the Dunajec river gorge, with floating trips on wooden canoes bound into rafts, hikes to the Trzy Korony or Sokolica hills.

Among the monuments of the folk architecture notable are Goral villages of Osturňa and Jezersko in Slovakia.

Other attractions include the spa village of Vyšné Ružbachy, the medieval town of Podolínec, the monastery in Červený Kláštor and the winter resorts in Osturňa and Spišská Stará Ves. In Poland, there are also many attractions available, e.g., the Niedzica ski centre, the Niedzica Castle or the Czorsztyn reservoir, which is used for recreation.

== Gallery ==
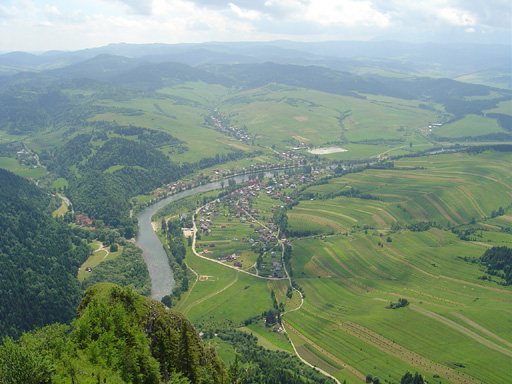
Dunajec from Trzy Korony

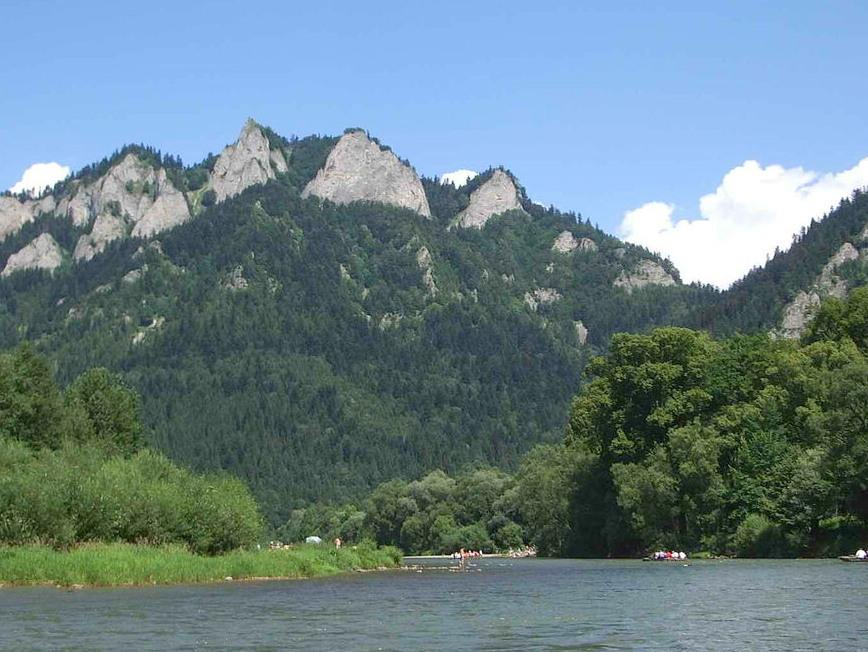
Trzy Korony from the Dunajec river

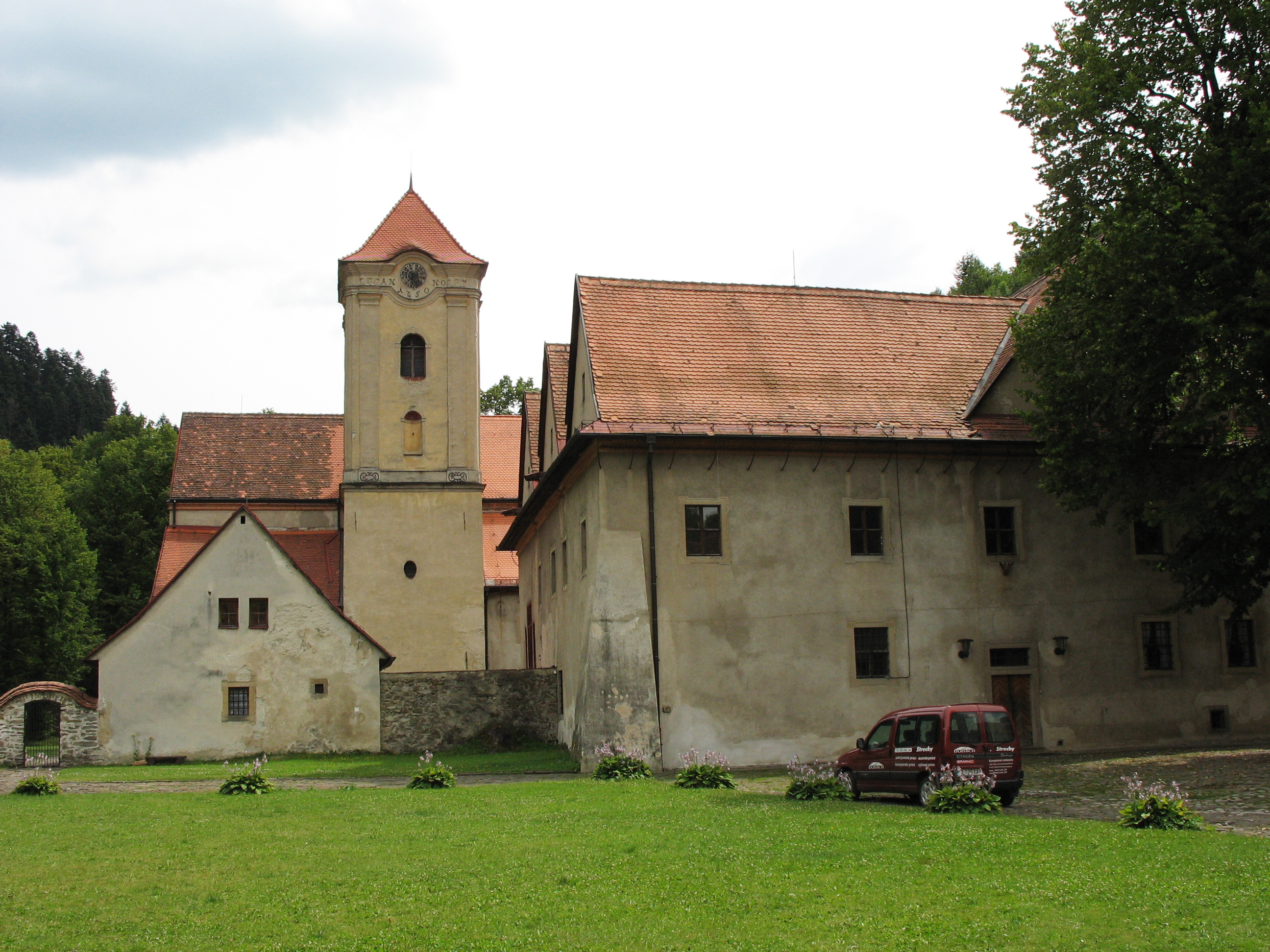
Červený kláštor

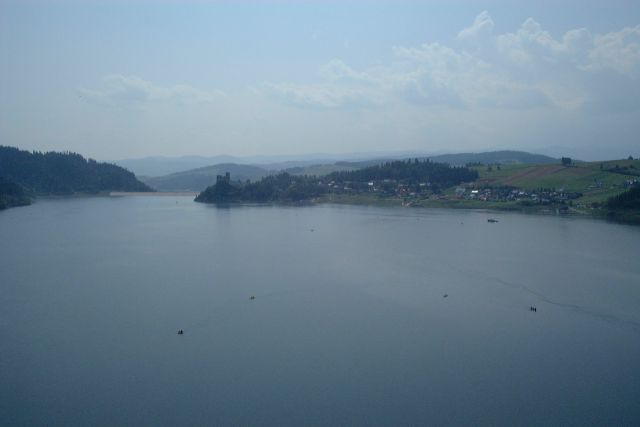
Czorsztyn reservoir in Poland

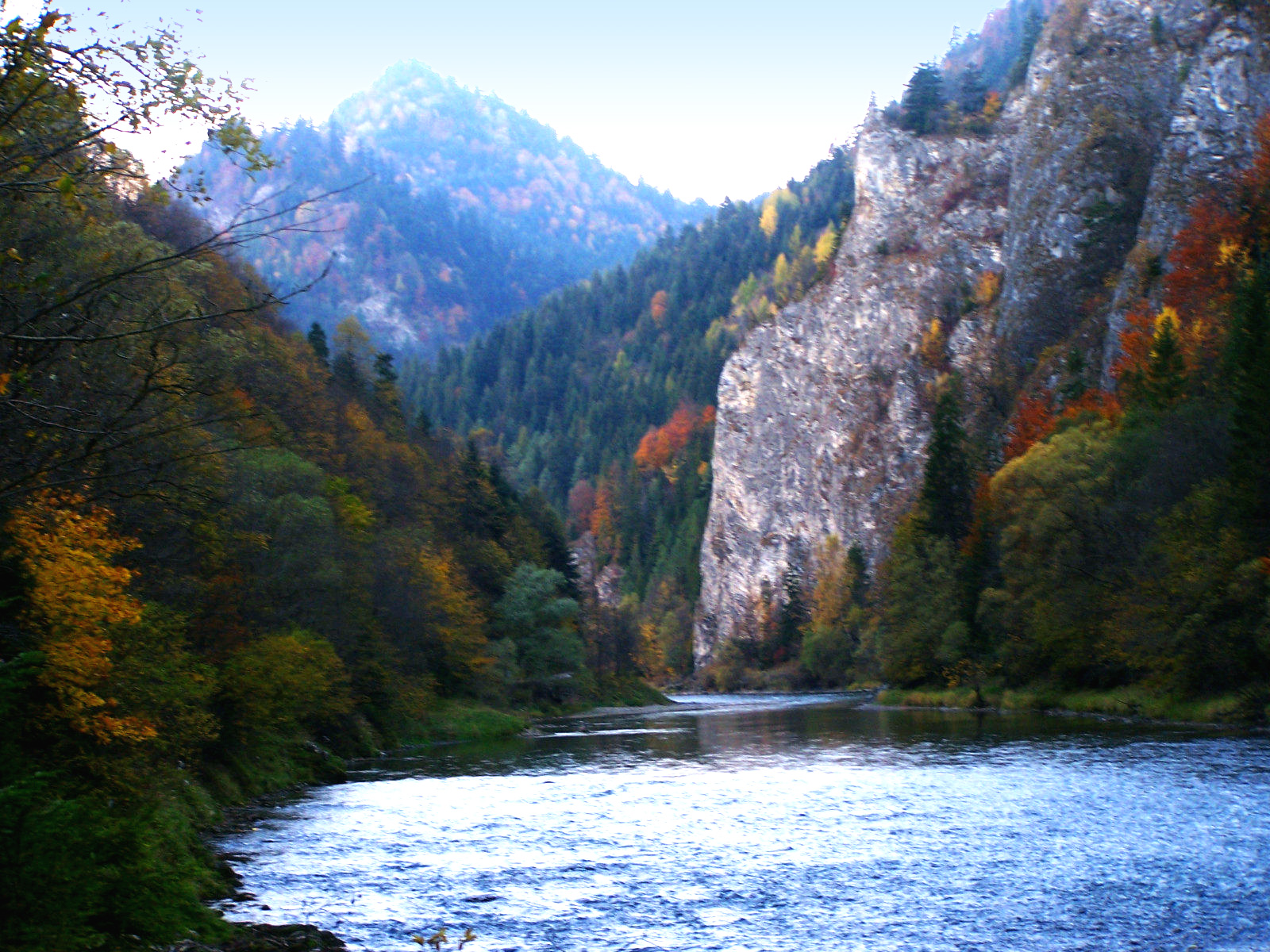
Dunajec River Gorge

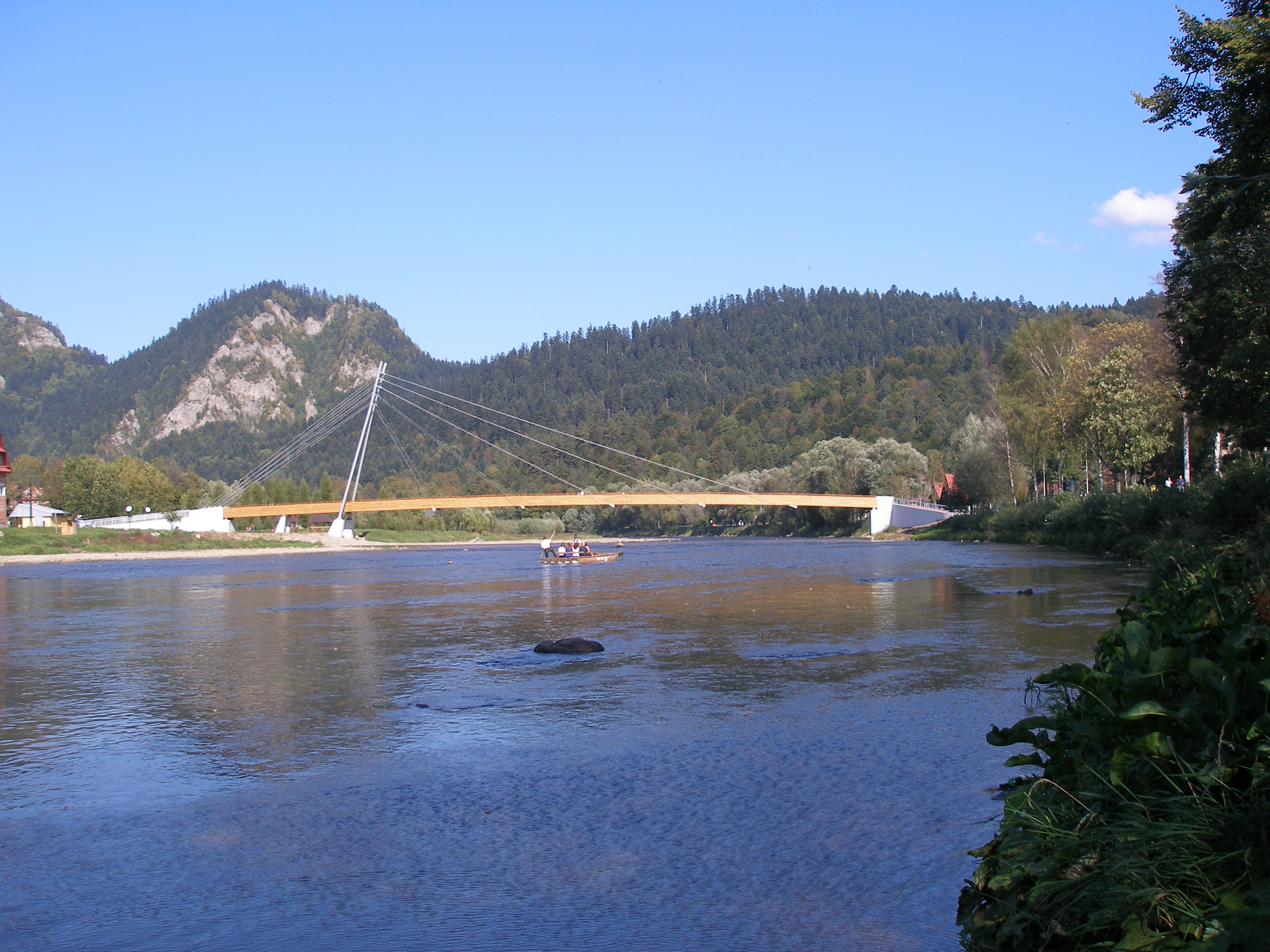
Rafting on the river, with the border bridge in the background
