= Majerle =

Majerle is a Slovene surname. Notable people with the surname include:

- Dan Majerle (born 1965), American basketball player and coach
- Martina Majerle (born 1980), Croatian singer

== See also ==
- Majere (disambiguation)
