= Dunajec =

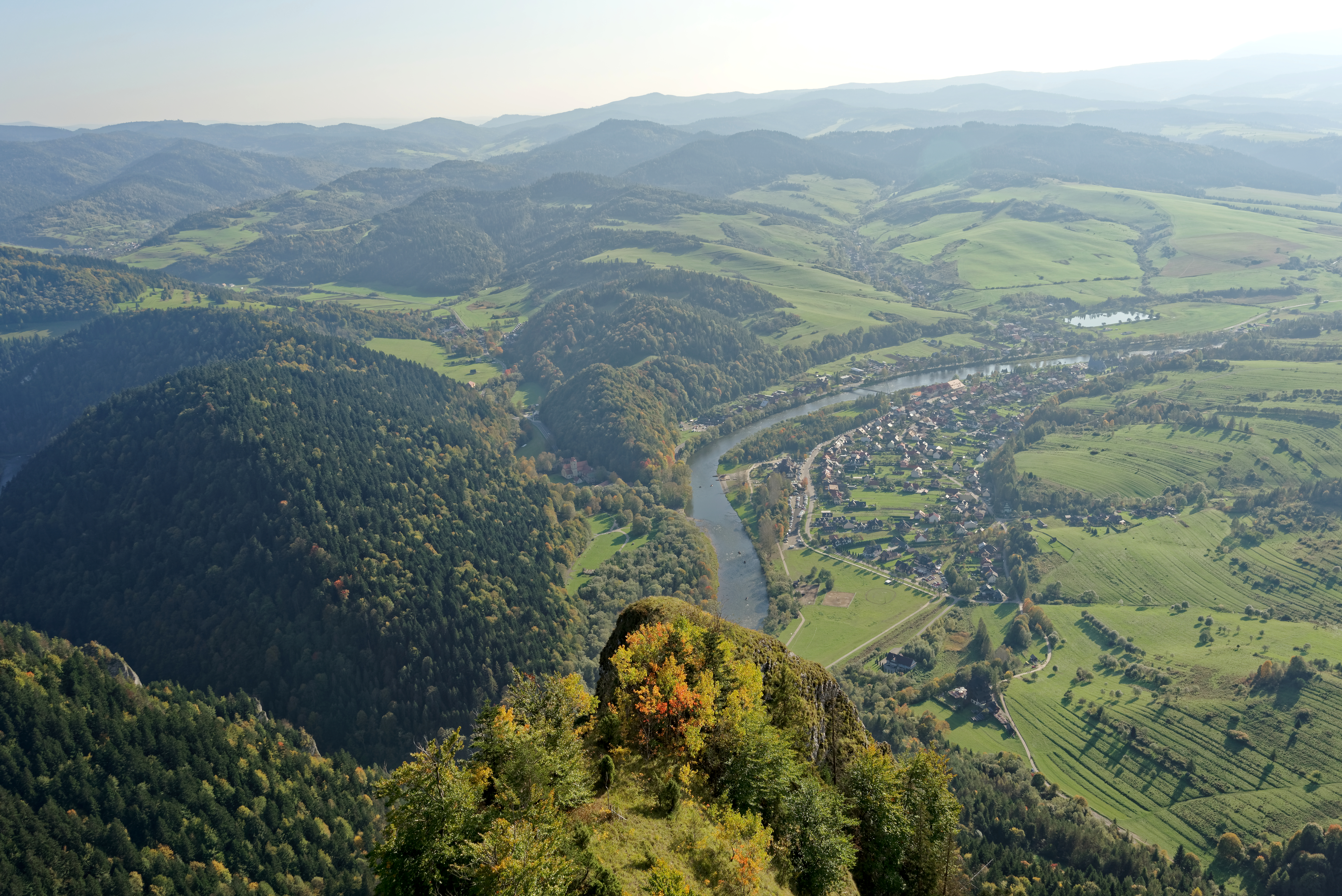
- Dunajec viewed from Trzy Korony

Location
- Country: Slovakia, Poland

Physical characteristics
- Source
  - location: confluence of Czarny Dunajec and Biały Dunajec
- Mouth
  - location: Vistula
  - coordinates: 50.2431°N 20.7283°E
- Length: 249 km (155 mi)
- Basin size: 6,796 km^{2} (2,624 sq mi)
- Discharge
  - average: 85.5 m^{3}/s (3,020 cu ft/s)

Basin features
- Progression: Vistula→ Baltic Sea

The Dunajec (Polish pronunciation: [duˈnajɛt͡s]; Goral dialects: Dónajec; Slovak pronunciation: [ˈdunajet͡s]) is a river running through northeastern Slovakia and southern Poland. It is also regarded as the main river of the Goral Lands. It is a right tributary of the Vistula River. It begins in Nowy Targ at the junction of two short mountain rivers, Czarny Dunajec and Biały Dunajec (Black and White Dunajec). Dunajec forms the border between Poland and Slovakia for 17 kilometres (11 mi) in the Pieniny Środkowe (Slovak: Centrálne Pieniny) range, east of the Czorsztyn reservoir.

== Geography ==
The Dunajec is 249 kilometres (155 mi) long, including its source river Czarny Dunajec, which makes it Poland's thirteenth longest river. It has a basin area of 6,796 square kilometres (2,624 sq mi) (4,838 [1,868] in Poland, and 1,958 [756] in Slovakia). On the Slovak-Polish border, the Dunajec flows through the Zamagurie region, with attractions such as the Dunajec River Gorge, the Trzy Korony massif with a 500 metres (1,600 ft) precipice, Červený Kláštor, and two Pieniny castles in Czorsztyn and Niedzica.

Below the two source streams, the Dunajec flows through a broad valley called Nowotarska Basin. It then supplies the waters of the dam in Niedzica (Jezioro Czorsztyńskie Lake) and the dam in Sromowce Wyżne (Sromowce Wyżne reservoir). Flowing through the central part of the Pieniny range, it creates a picturesque turn at the Polish Slovak border between Sromowce Wyżne and Szczawnica, where it flows by Kotuńka rock which differentiates the area from the over parts of the river. Further down, it turns to the north into the Western Beskid Mountains, and Sądecka Basin (where it merges with its own largest tributary, the Poprad river). It flows across an open valley of the Beskid Foothills and falls down across Rożnów Foothills (with two more dams: the Jezioro Rożnowskie Lake, and Jezioro Czchowskie Lake) and finally, it leads into the Sandomierz Basin and the valley of Vistula Lowlands. The Dunajec flows into the Vistula River in the vicinity of Opatowiec.

== Towns and townships ==
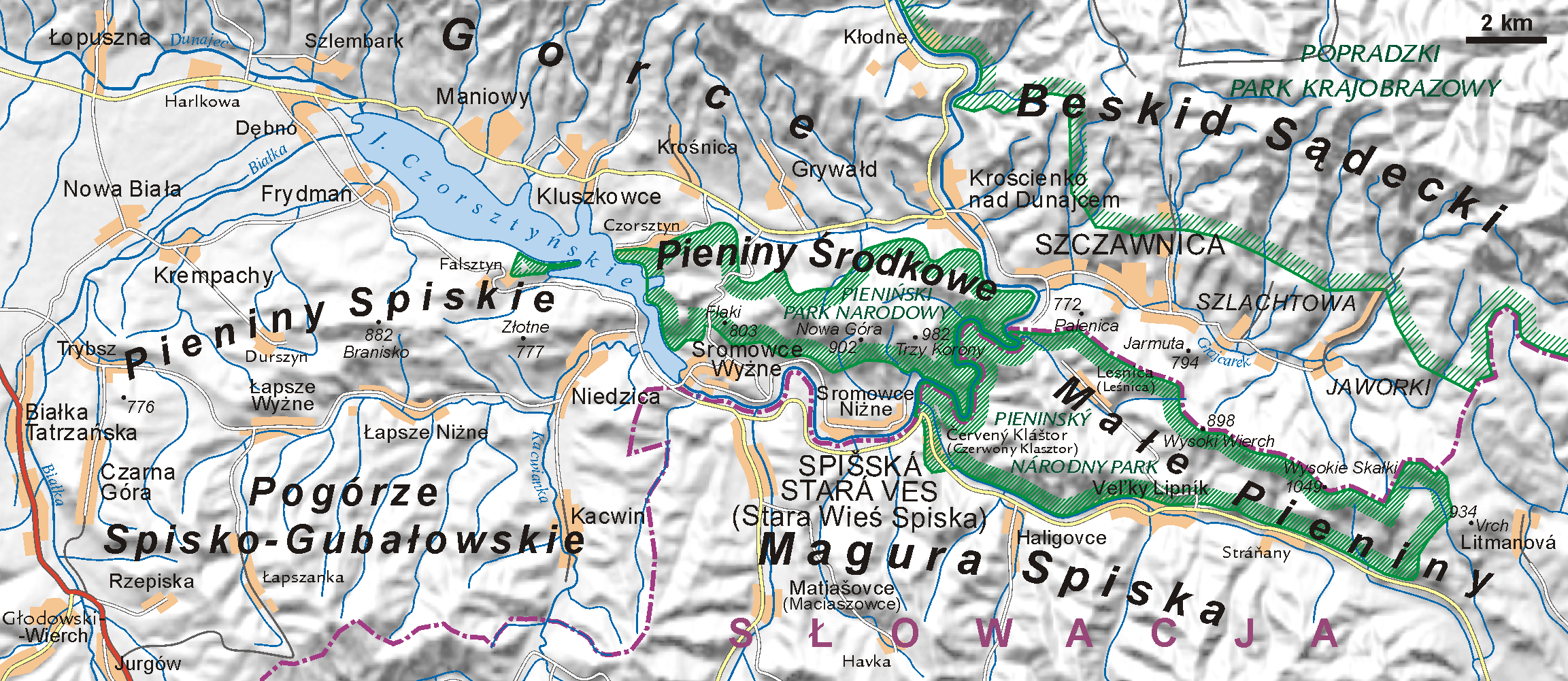
Dunajec in the Pieniny Środkowe range (Slovak: Centrálne Pieniny) forming a 27 km border between Poland and Slovakia

The Dunajec flows through or near these locations in Poland and north Slovakia:

- Dunajec River
  - Spišská Stará Ves
  - Majere
  - Lechnica
  - Červený Kláštor
  - Lesnica
  - Nowy Targ
  - Maniowy
  - Czorsztyn
  - Szczawnica
  - Krościenko nad Dunajcem
  - Łącko
  - Stary Sącz
  - Nowy Sącz
  - Gródek nad Dunajcem
  - Czchów
  - Zakliczyn
  - Wojnicz
  - Tarnów
  - Żabno
- Biały Dunajec (tributary)
  - Zakopane
  - Poronin
  - Biały Dunajec
  - Szaflary
  - Nowy Targ
- Czarny Dunajec (tributary)
  - Kościelisko
  - Czarny Dunajec
  - Nowy Targ

== Gallery ==
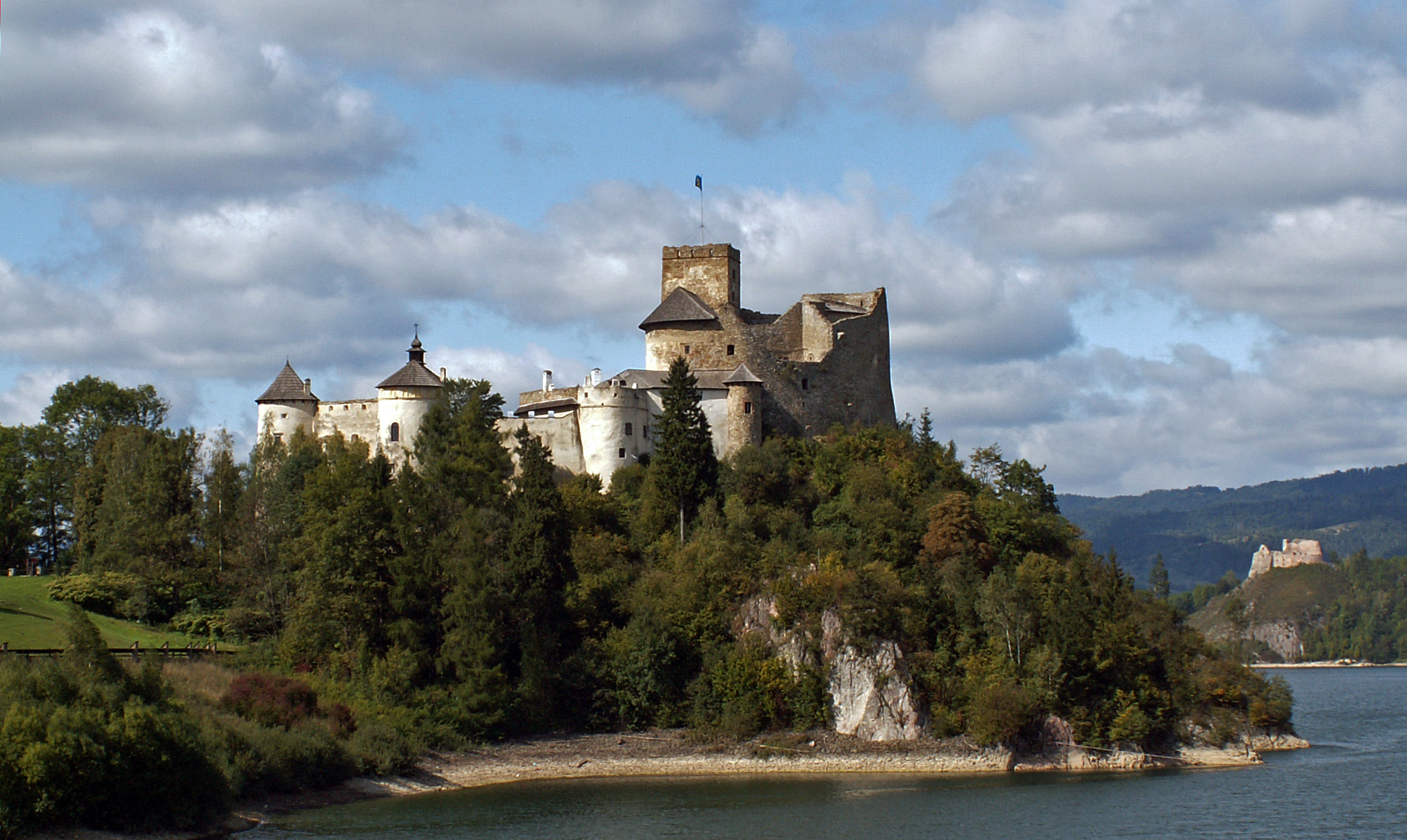
Niedzica Castle with the Czorsztyn Castle ruins in the background

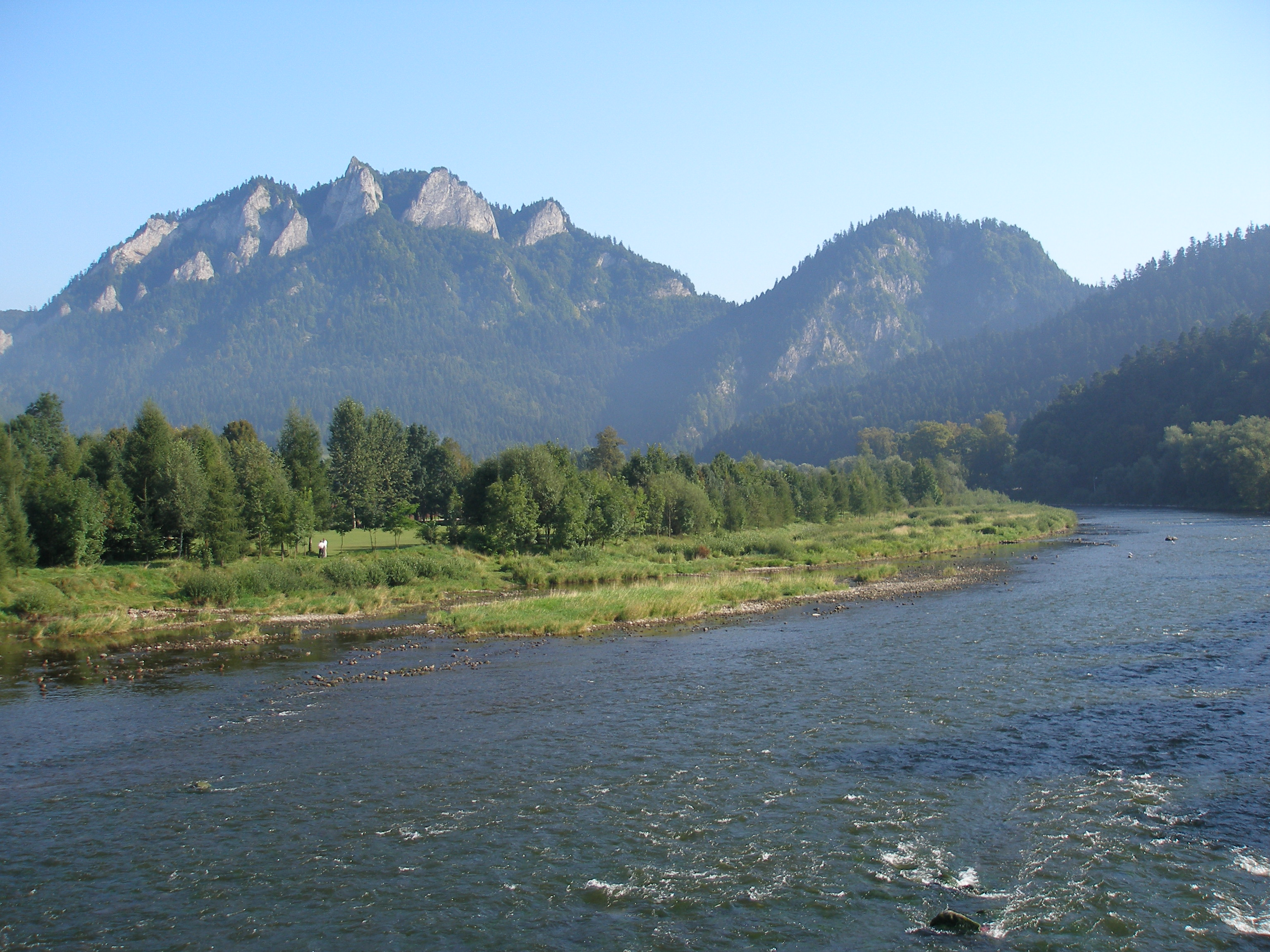
Dunajec and the Trzy Korony Mountain

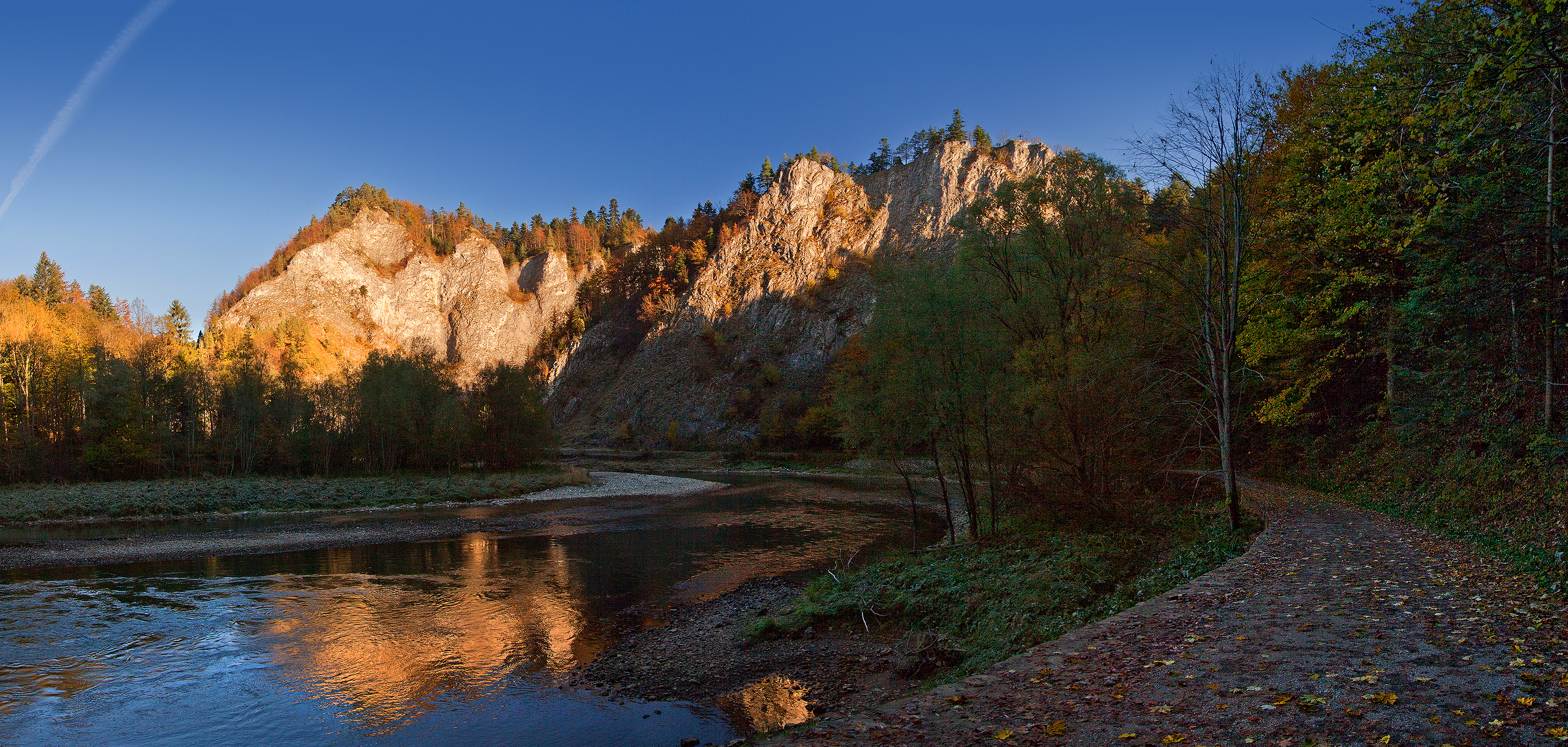
Dunajec in autumn

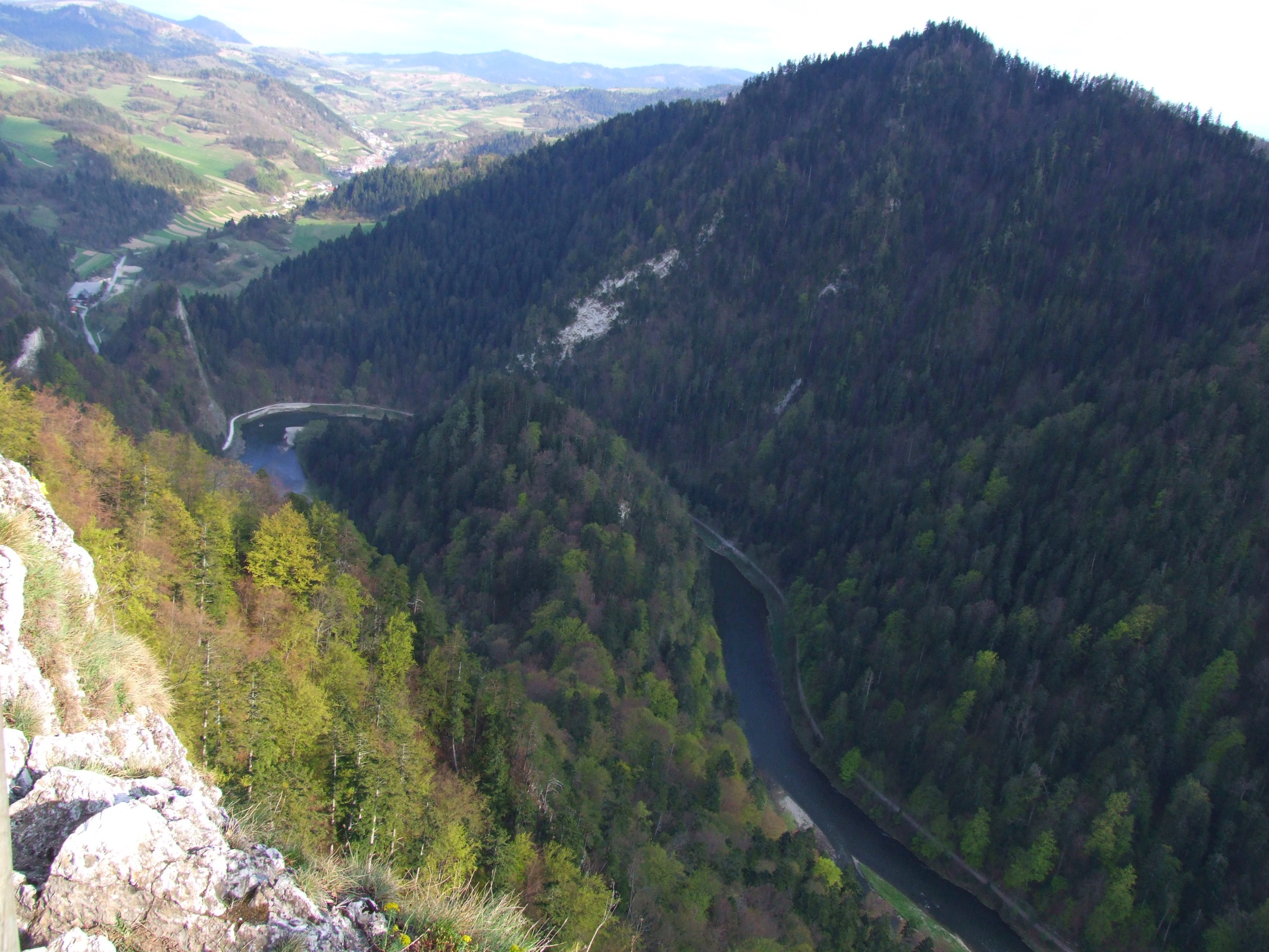
Dunajec Gorge in the Pieniny mountains

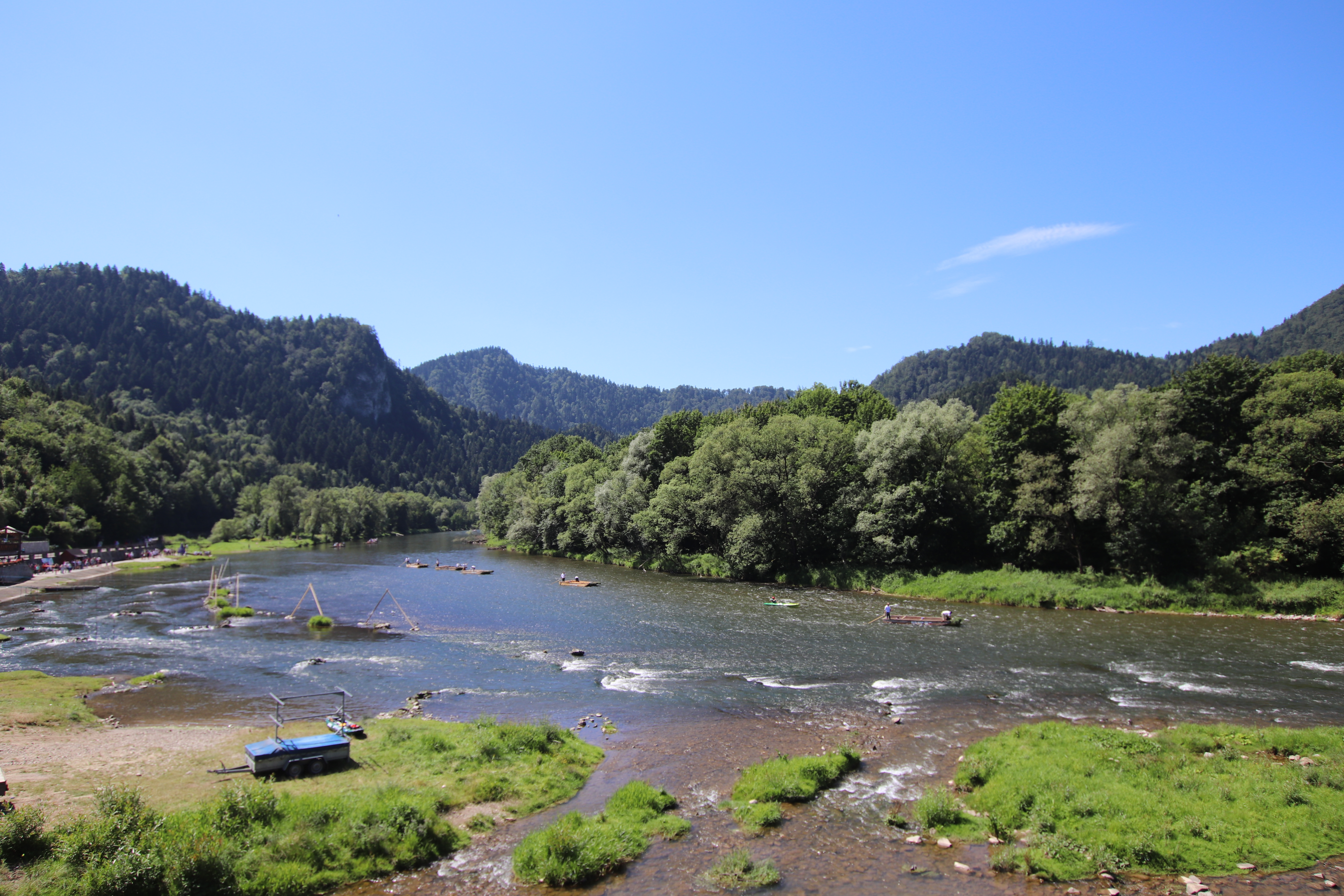
Dunajec in Szczawnica

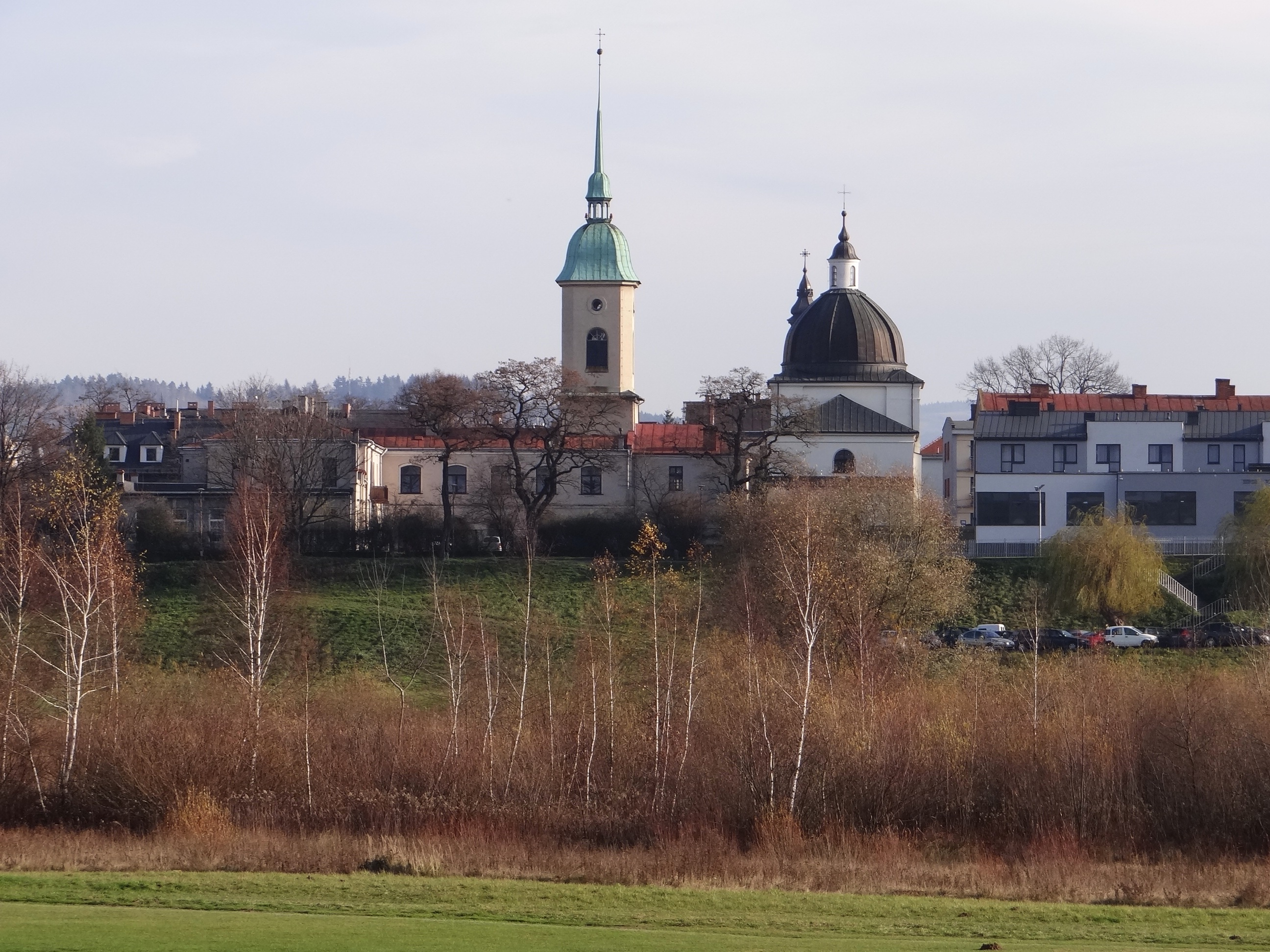
Dunajec in Nowy Sącz

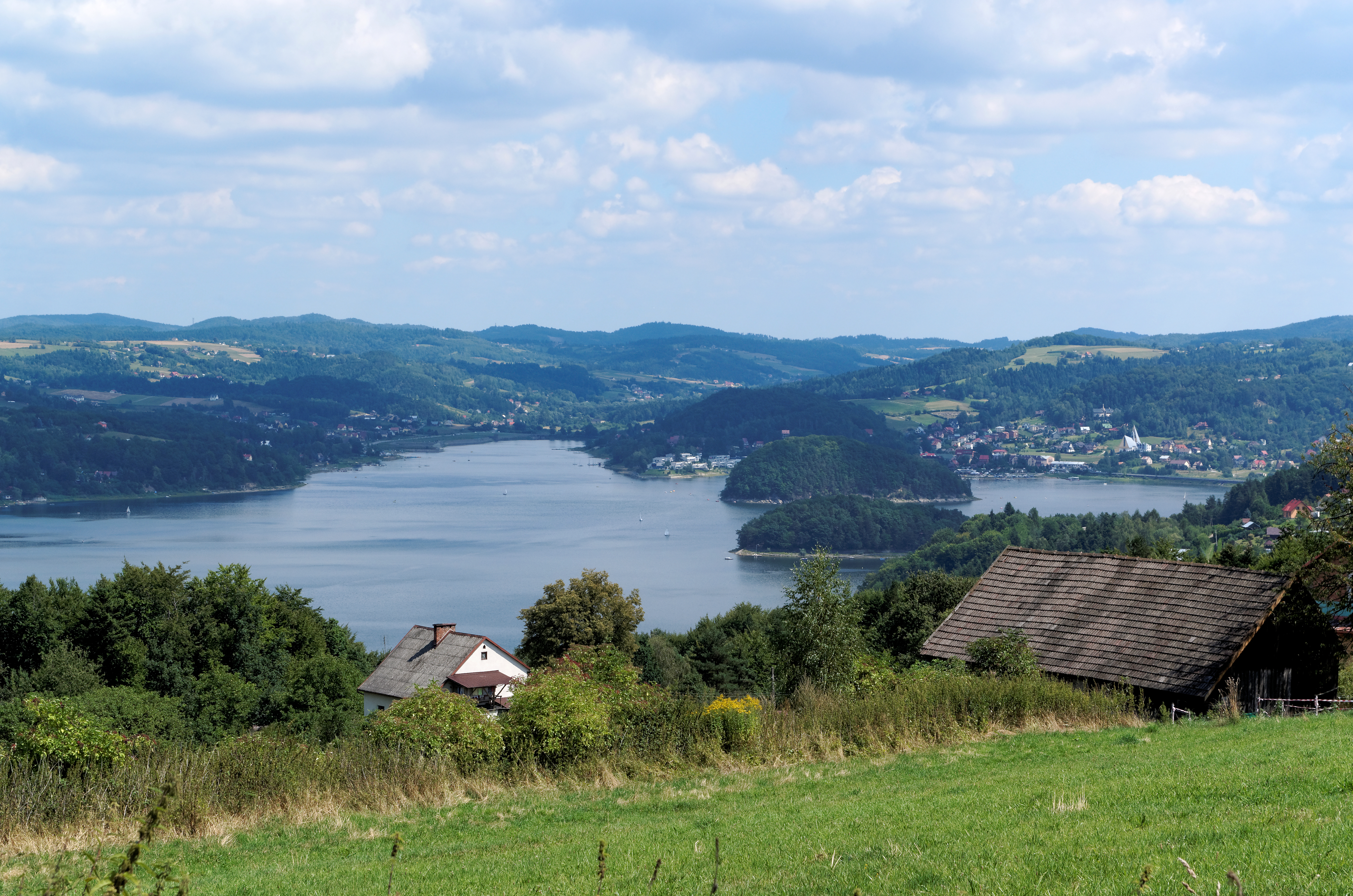
Lake Rożnów

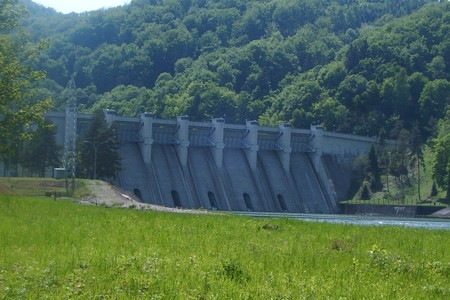
Rożnów dam

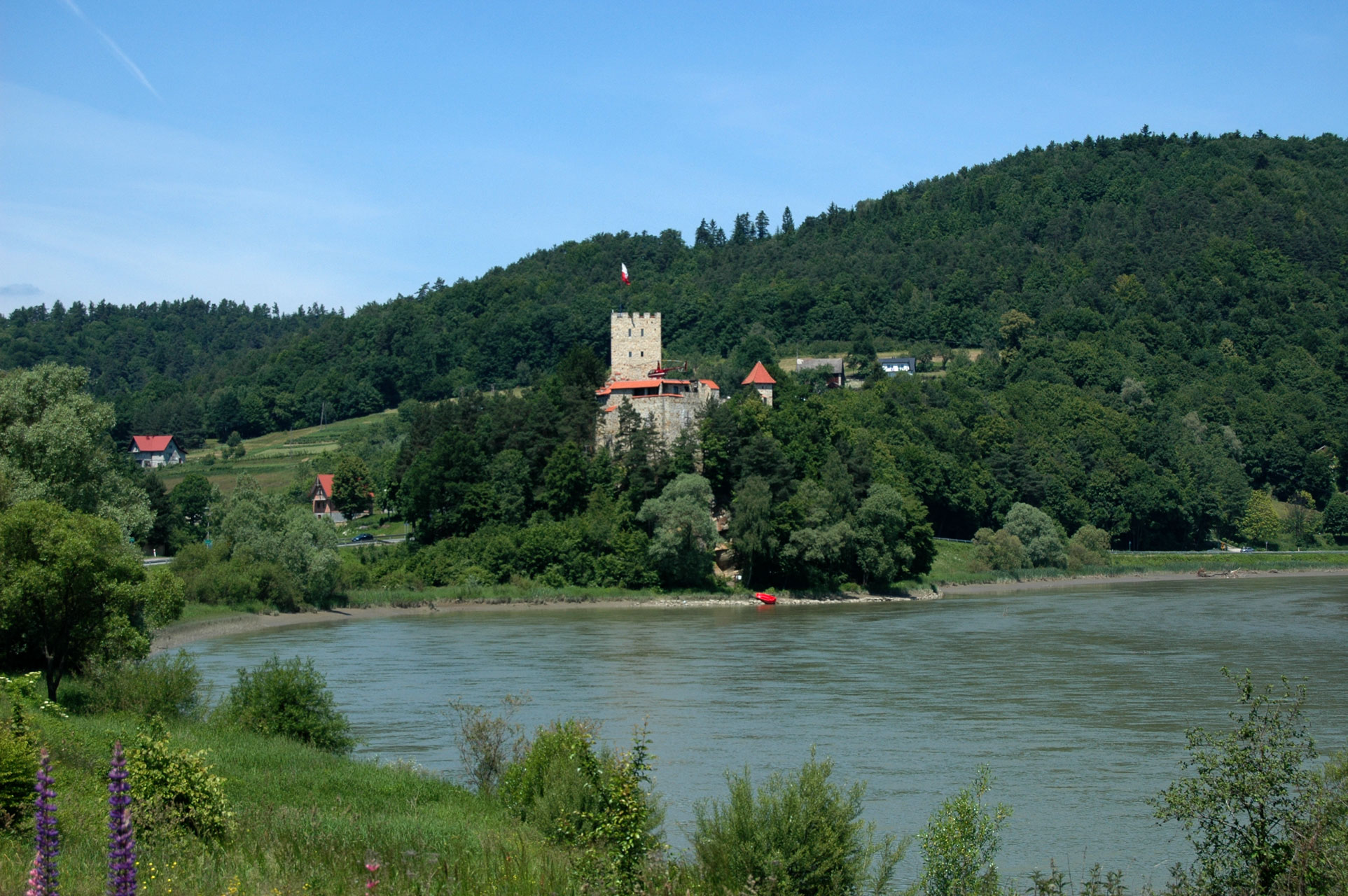
Tropsztyn Castle

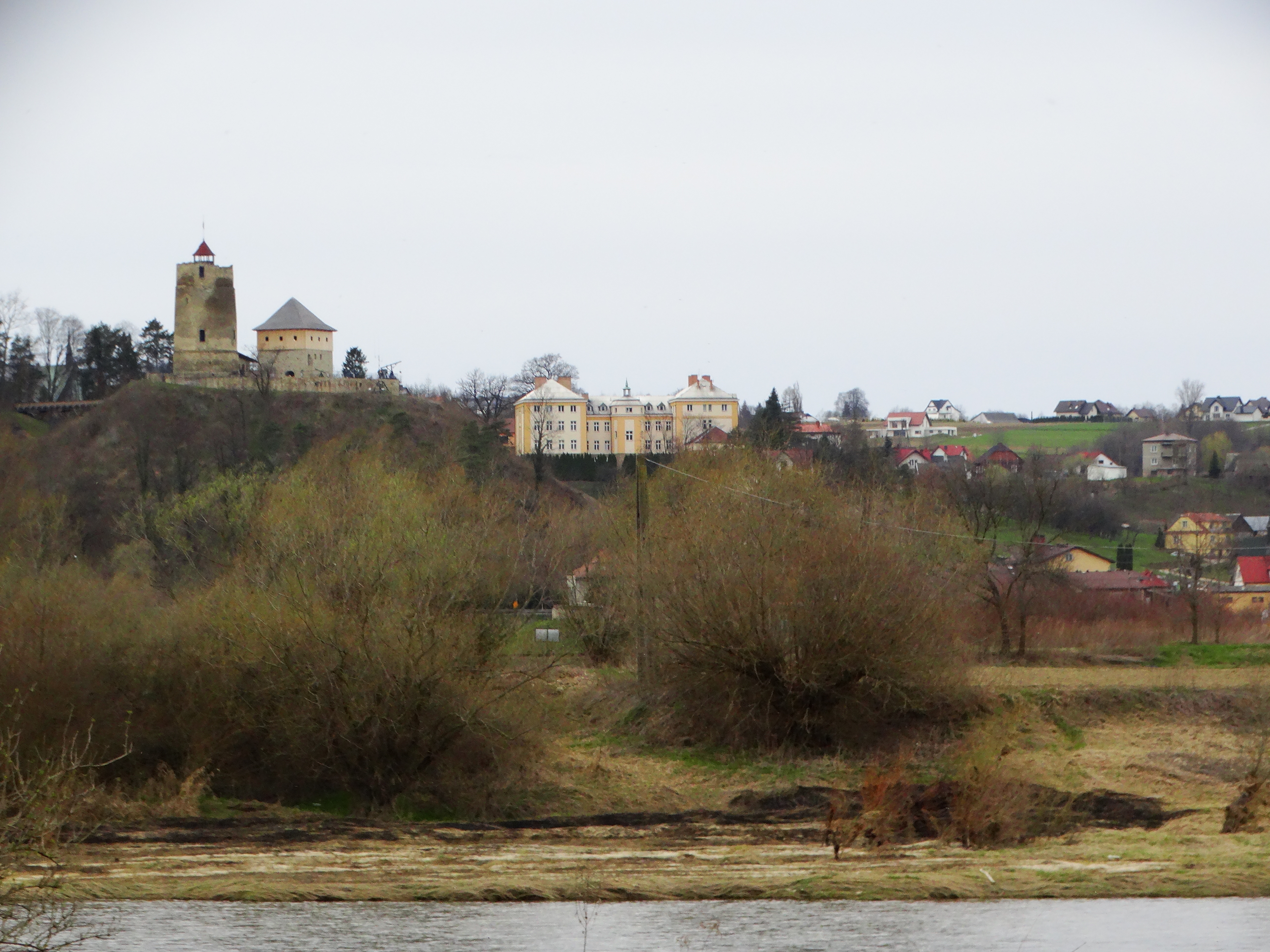
Czchów Castle

== See also ==
- Dunajec River Gorge
- Rivers of Poland
- Rivers of Slovakia
- 1934 flood in Poland
- Dunajec river castles
