= Cigeľka =

- Municipality
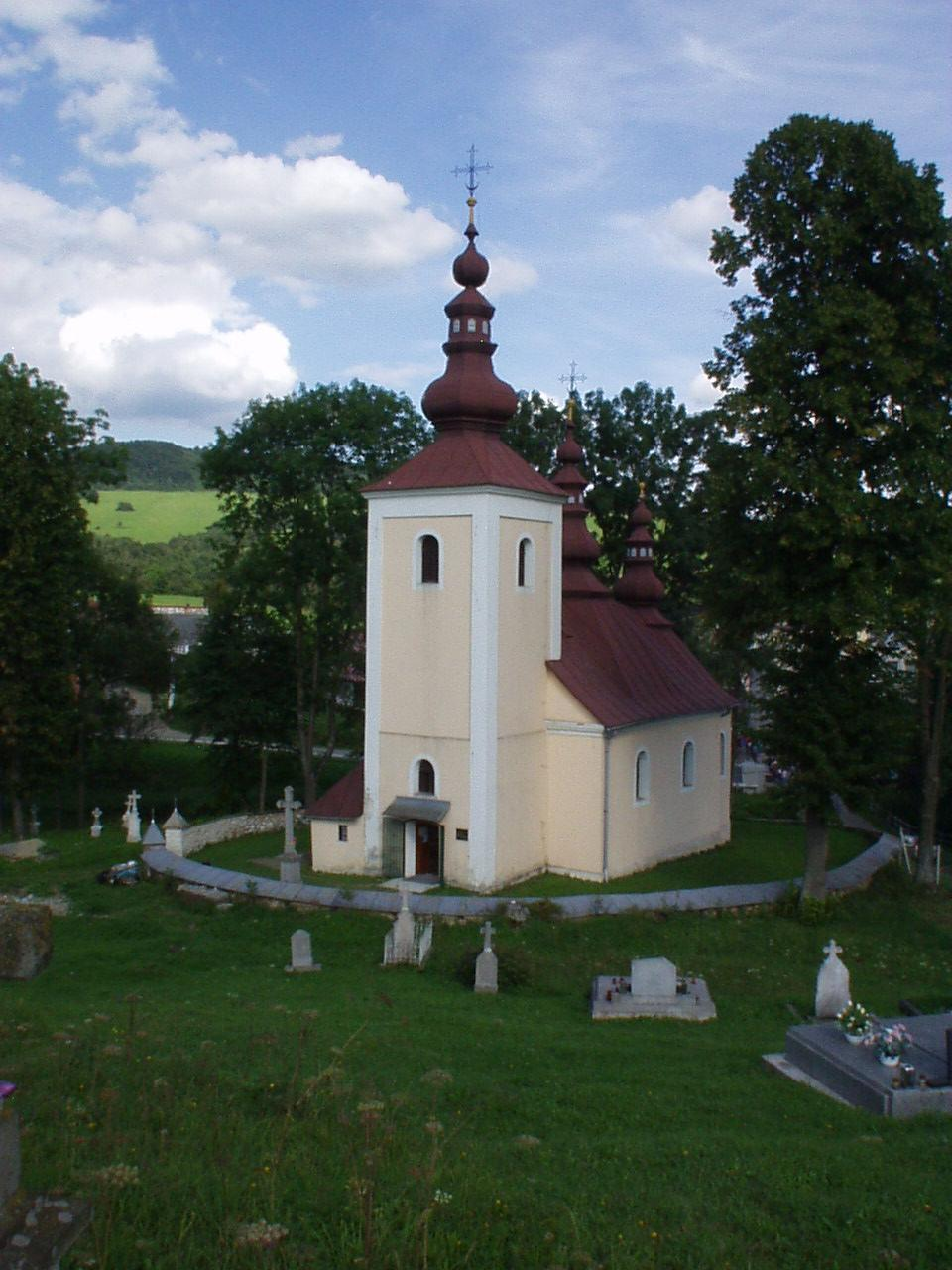

- Flag

- Location of Cigeľka in the Prešov Region Location of Cigeľka in Slovakia
- Coordinates: 49.41°N 21.13°E
- Country: Slovakia
- Region: Prešov Region
- District: Bardejov District
- First mentioned: 1414

Area
  - Total: 15.98 km^{2} (6.17 sq mi)
- Elevation: 508 m (1,667 ft)

Population (2025)
  - Total: 637
- Time zone: UTC+1 (CET)
  - Summer (DST): UTC+2 (CEST)
- Postal code: 860 2
- Area code: +421 54
- Vehicle registration plate (until 2022): BJ
- Website: www.obeccigelka.sk

Cigeľka is a village and municipality in Bardejov District in the Prešov Region of north-east Slovakia with Ruthenian and Roma inhabitants. It lies in the valley of Oľchovec below the Busov hill (1 002 meters above sea level) near the Slovakia-Poland border. There is a Greek Catholic church of Saints Cosmas and Damian in the year 1816, which served its first liturgy Presov later Bishop Paul Peter Gojdič.

== History ==
In historical records, the village was first mentioned in 1414. In the following centuries the estate belonged to Makovica manor. In the 19th century the village was affected by emigration to North America for economic reasons, in 1947 the proportion of the population at the instigation of the Soviet authorities moved to Ukraine (in particular the village Chomut, the current name Zelenyj Haj – Зелений Гай), from the 20th to the sixties the dawn of the 21st century centuries, the majority returned to Slovakia.

The village has a memorial to the victims of World War II from Cigeľka – especially the seven young boys who were sent to fight the war ended without proper training, and a few Jewish families whose members died in concentration camps. Memorial was unveiled in October 1989. Its author is a painter Mikuláš Lovacký.

== Geography ==
The municipality lies at an altitude of 508 metres (1,667 ft) and covers an area of 15.98 km^{2} (6.17 sq mi) (2025).

== Population ==
Population statistic (10 years)
Year	1995	2005	2015	2025
Count	367	477	566	637
Difference		+29.97%	+18.65%	+12.54%

Population statistic
Year	2024	2025
Count	620	637
Difference		+2.74%

It has a population of 637 people (31 December 2025).

=== Ethnicity ===
Census 2021 (1+ %)
Ethnicity	Number	Fraction
Slovak	562	95.74%
Rusyn	47	8%
Romani	19	3.23%
Not found out	10	1.7%
Total	587	

In year 2021 was 587 people by ethnicity 562 as Slovak, 47 as Rusyn, 19 as Romani, 10 as Not found out, 4 as Czech, 4 as Ukrainian and 1 as Polish.

Note on population: The difference values of population numbers in the table "Population statistic" and in the sections "Ethnicity" & "Religion" is caused by the use of various statistical methods.

=== Religion ===
Census 2021 (1+ %)
Religion	Number	Fraction
Greek Catholic Church	495	84.33%
None	34	5.79%
Roman Catholic Church	29	4.94%
Eastern Orthodox Church	15	2.56%
Calvinist Church	6	1.02%
Total	587	

In year 2021 was 587 people by religion 495 from Greek Catholic Church, 34 from None, 29 from Roman Catholic Church, 15 from Eastern Orthodox Church, 6 from Calvinist Church, 5 from Not found out, 2 from Evangelical Church and 1 from Old Catholic Church.

== Gallery ==
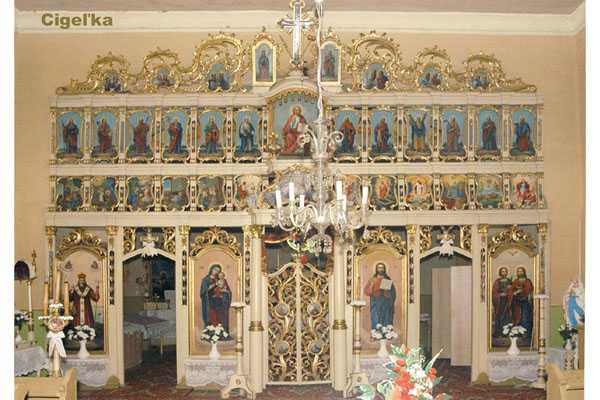
Church iconostasis Saints Cosmas and Damian in Cigeľka

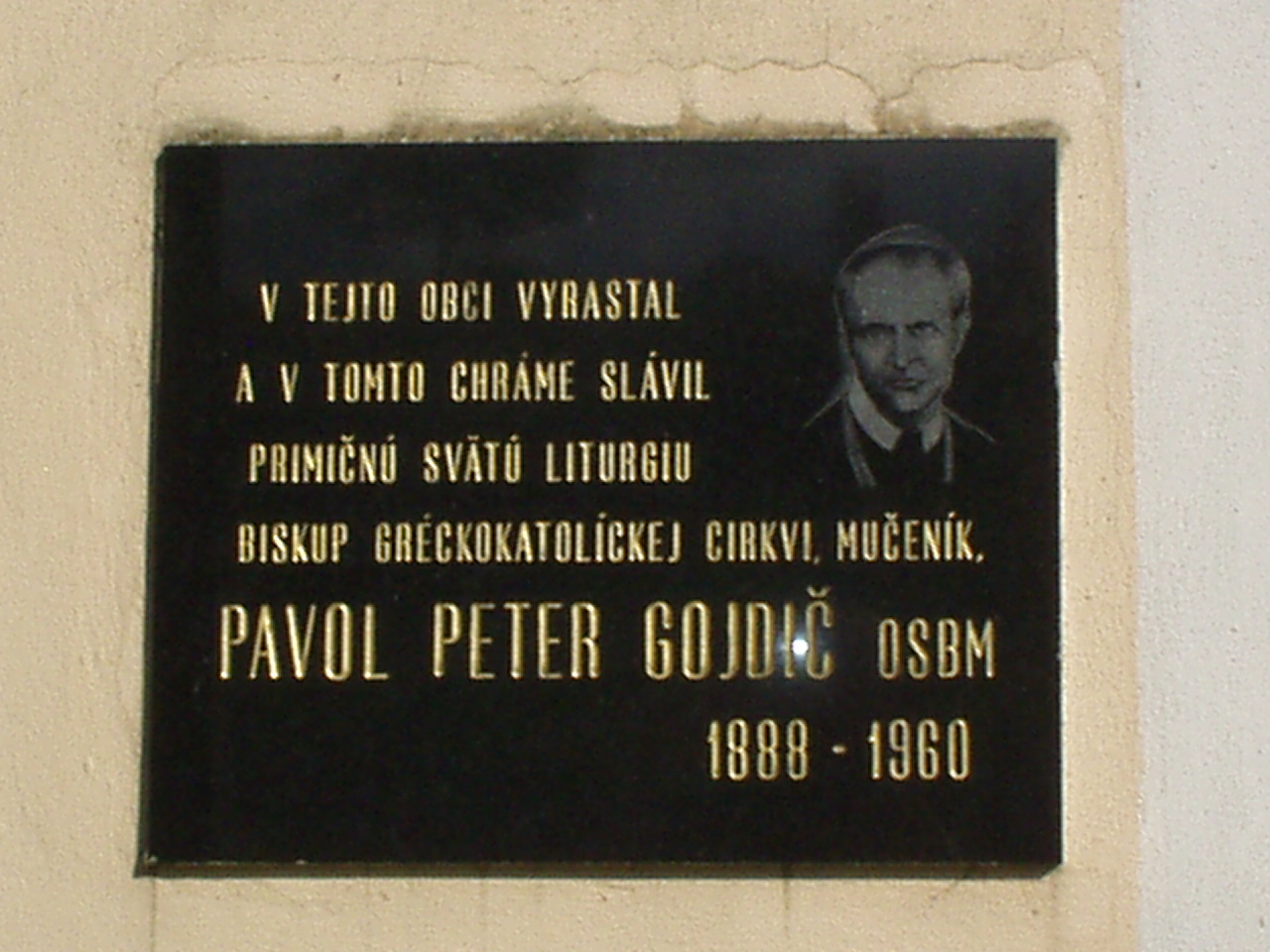
Commemorative plaque on the wall of the temple of Saints Cosmas and Damian in Cigeľka

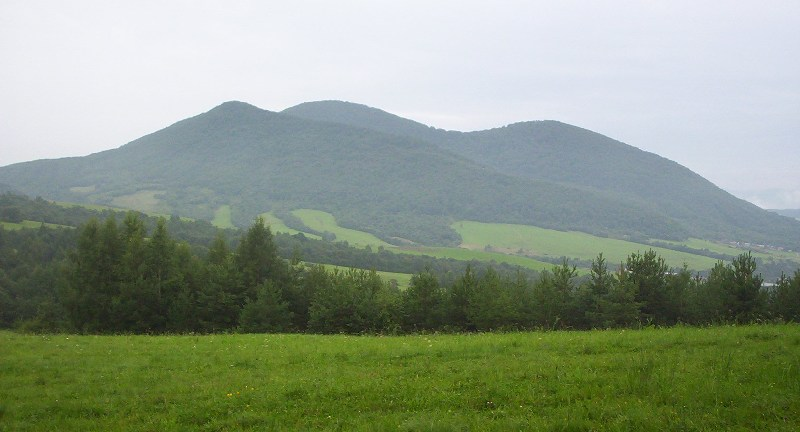
Busov hill over Cigeľka

== Mineral water ==
There is a spring mineral water the same name. Almanac "Spas of Czechoslovak Republic of 1949" states as Cigeľka spa place for the treatment of gastric diseases, diseases of upper respiratory tract, heart and blood vessels, and skin diseases. At present, Cigeľka does not have the status of spa. In addition to salt mineral water springs in Cigeľka from dozens of sources acidulous water.

== See also ==
- List of municipalities and towns in Slovakia
