= Majere =

== Places ==
- Majere (village) is a village in Slovakia.

== Fiction ==
Majere, in the fictional world of Dragonlance, may refer to:

- Raistlin Majere
- Caramon Majere
- Tika Waylan, also known as Tika Waylan Majere
- Palin Majere
- Tanin Majere
- Ulin Majere
- Sturm Majere
- Usha Majere
- Linsha Majere
- Dezra Majere
- Laura Majere
