= Trzy Korony =

Mountain in Poland

Trzy Korony Three Crowns
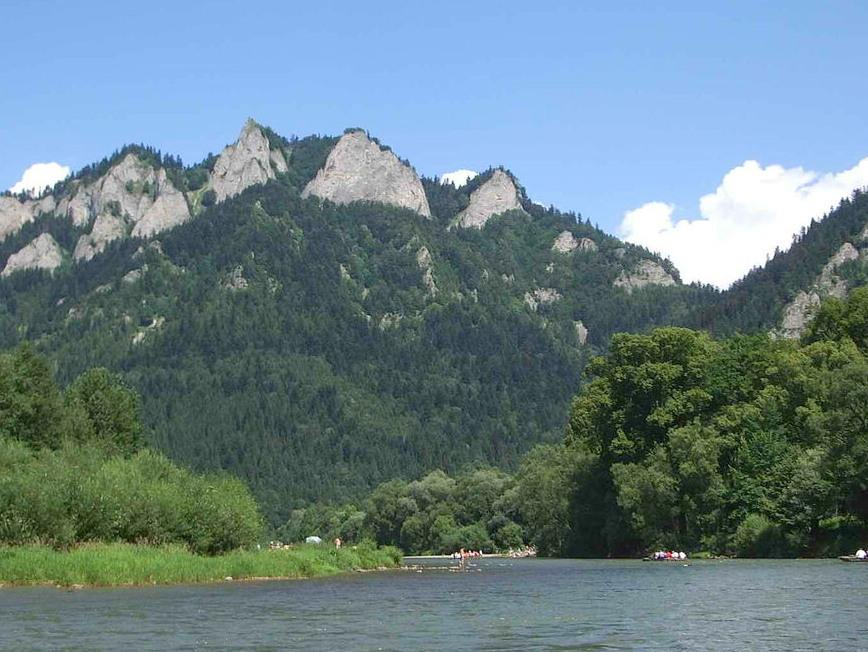
- Trzy Korony

Highest point
- Elevation: 982 m (3,222 ft)
- Prominence: 329 m (1,079 ft)
- Coordinates: 49°24′49″N 20°24′51″E

Geography
- Location within Poland
- Location: Poland
- Parent range: Pieniny

Climbing
- Easiest route: tourist trails from Krościenko nad Dunajcem

Trzy Korony (English: Three Crowns) is the summit of the Three Crowns Massif, an independent portion of a range called Pieniny Mountains in the south of Poland. Trzy Korony forms the central part of a compact group of connected mountains known as Pieniny Środkowe, consisting mainly of the limestone and dolomite rock strata. Trzy Korony is located within the Pieniny National Park in Lesser Poland Voivodeship.

== Geography ==
The summit is separated from the surrounding peaks (known as Łysiny Group) by the Wyżni Łazek Pass, descending into deep valleys with streams surrounded by forested slopes. The Three Crowns consists of five sharp peaks, made of resistant limestone. The highest of the peaks is called Okrąglica. It stands 982 meters above sea level. At the top of Okrąglica there is an observation platform complete with metal barriers built for the tourists. – The platform, overlooking Dunajec River Gorge, can accommodate up to 15 people at a time.

The second tallest peak (southeast of Okrąglica), is called Płaska Skała, rising 950 m above sea level. The next peak known as Nad Ogródki located southwest of Okrąglica, is the third tallest, rising 940 m above sea level. At its top, there used to be a weather station built in 1933 and operated manually by a hermit.

The fourth peak, called Pańska or Bryłowa Skała rising 920 m above sea level, is a nesting zone for a rare bird the wallcreeper with extraordinary crimson wings. The smallest peak of the Trzy Korony summit is called Niżnia Okrąglica a.k.a. Ganek, Siodło. It stands 80 m lower than the tallest peak; to the south. Niżnia Okrąglica used to contain the original observation deck before the metal platform with barriers was built atop the tallest one, thus enlarging the Pieniny panorama.

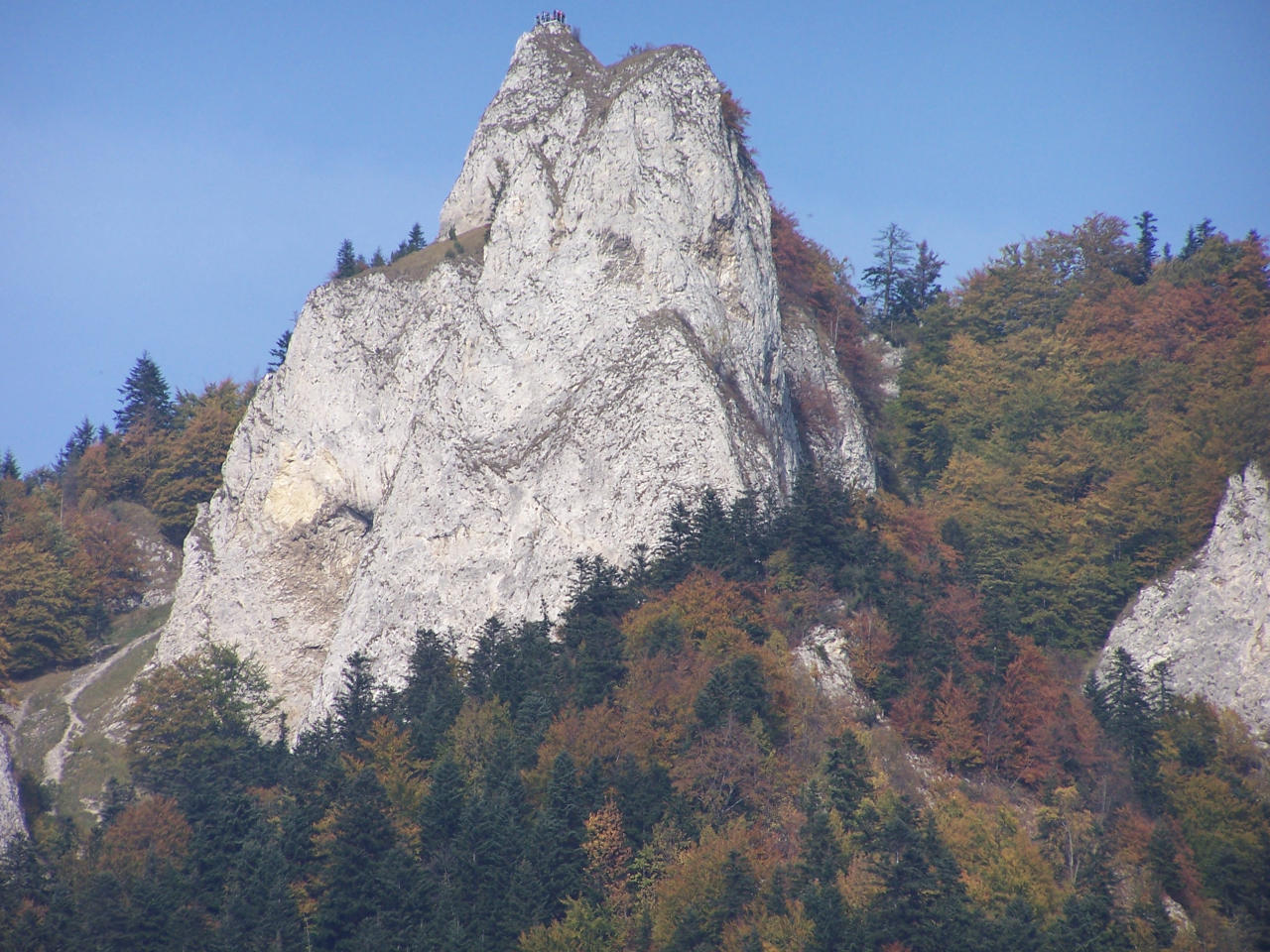
Okraglica, the highest peak with an observation deck, as seen from Płaska Skała

The Trzy Korony summit is one of the most popular tourist destinations in the Pieniny Mountains. The observation deck hangs over a 500 metres (1,600 ft) precipice, with a view of the Dunajec river gorge and the vast area of the Pieniny National Park, the Tatra Mountains, Beskid Sądecki, Gorce Mountains and Beskid Żywiecki. With clear weather conditions, one can see as far as Babia Góra, 63 km away.

The Three Crowns was originally called simply Pieniny. In 1834 (during the reign of Austria-Hungary) a German name Kronenberg appeared in documents (translated into Polish as the Crown). The current name took hold at around 1860. The Three Crowns massif contains at least 7 species of rare plants which cannot be found anywhere else in Pieniny, including the endemic species of Pieniny dandelion (already extinct), and Złocień Zawadzkiego. Besides them, there are numerous and rare lime-loving species of rock plants including Rozchodnik wielki – a host for a caterpillar of rare Pieniny Apollo butterfly.

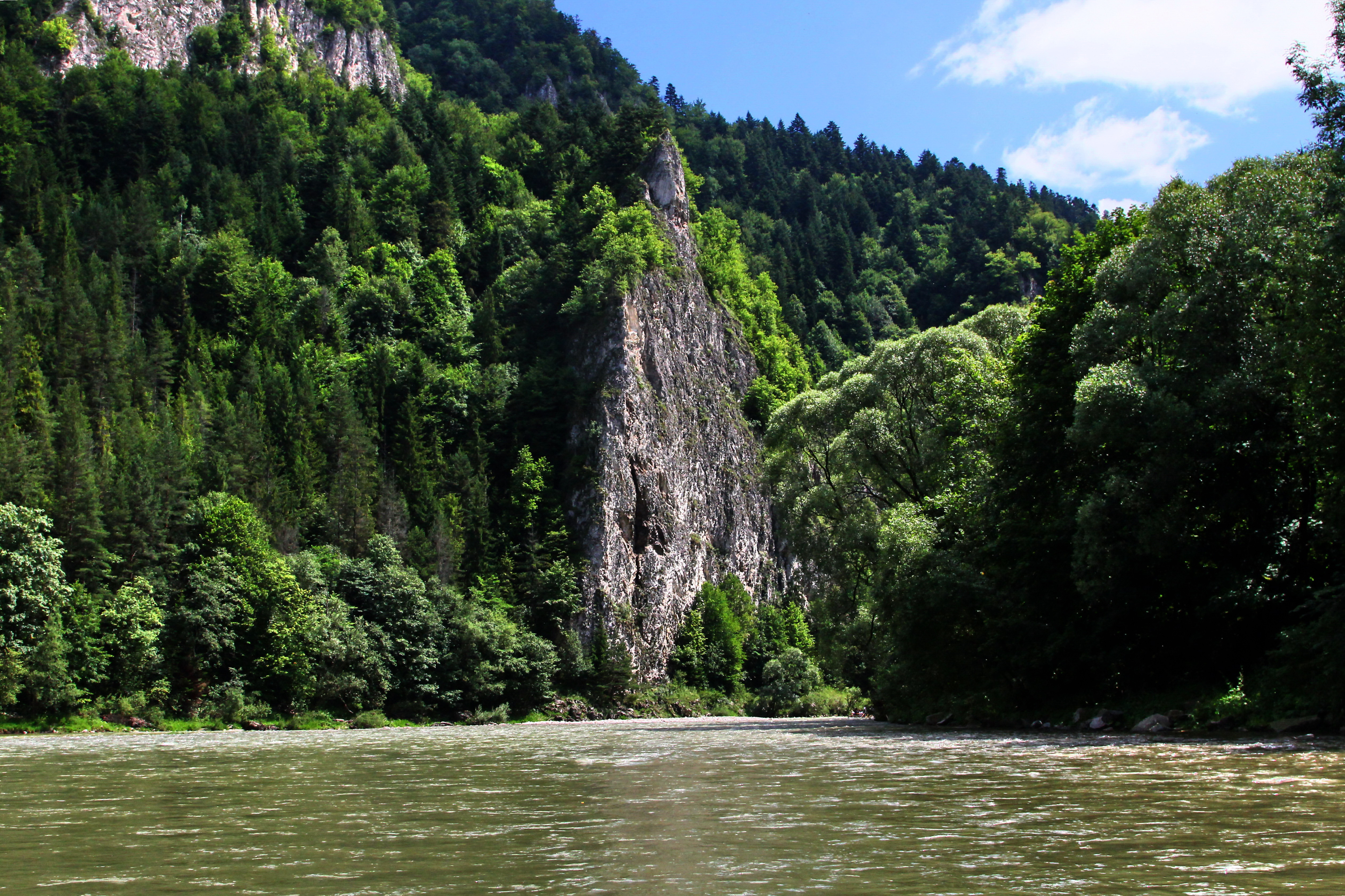
Dunajec River Gorge

The Three Crowns has been a tourist attraction for a very long time. First recorded trek to the top took place in 1767. First regular tourists walked up around 1830. In 1906, the first official route to the summit from Krościenko was labeled with blue signs. In 1929 after the liberation of Poland, the Three Crowns has been bought by the Polish government from its private owners and turned into the Pieniny National Park established in 1932. And finally, in 2001–2002 the park's authorities built the new metal platforms with barriers to accommodate mass tourism.

== Tourist trails ==
All trails that lead to the Three Crowns summit from the main roads below, are color marked, and join together under the peak called Siodło. From there the viewing platform at the tallest peak, can be reached in 15 minutes. During the tourist season the access to the platform must be paid for, allowing for the authorized entry to the peak of Sokolica as well. In good weather there are large queues forming at the entrance sometimes. In the village of Sromowce Niżne at the southern foot of the Three Crowns, there's a popular hostel operated by PTTK called the Three Crowns.

The summit of the Three Crowns can be reached by several color marked trails ascending from different local towns such as Szczawnica, Krościenko nad Dunajcem, Czorsztyn and Sromowce Wyżne.

1. The blue trail from Szczawnica leads through the hills of Sokolica, Czertezik, Czerteż, Bajków Groń (Sokola Perć) and Zamkowa Góra
2. The yellow trail from Szczawnica leads through Polana Wyrobek and Przełęcz Szopka before joining in with the blue trail (above)
3. The yellow and blue trails from Krościenko nad Dunajcem lead through Przełęcz Szopka, then along the blue trail up to Siodło. The approximate time to the top is 2 hours; 1:45 min back
4. The yellow and blue trails from Krościenko via Zamkowa Góra (the Castle Mountain) as per above
5. The yellow and blue trails from Sromowce Niżne lead through Wąwóz Szopczański, along Przełęcz Szopka, and then join in with the blue trail leading to the Siodło.
6. The yellow, green and blue trails from Sromowce Niżne lead through Wąwóz Szopczański, then along the green trail to the Wyżni Łazek onto the clearing Kosarzyska and from there along the blue trail toward Siodło. The approximate time to the top is 2 hours; 1:45 min back
7. The blue trail from Czorsztyn leads through the mountain passes of Przełęcz Osice, Macelak, Przełęcz Trzy Kopce, and Przełęcz Szopka toward Siodło
8. The red and blue trails from Sromowce Wyżne – the rafting station on the Dunajec in Kąty village – lead to Przełęcz Trzy Kopce (c. 45 min), where they join in with the blue trail leading up from Czorsztyn

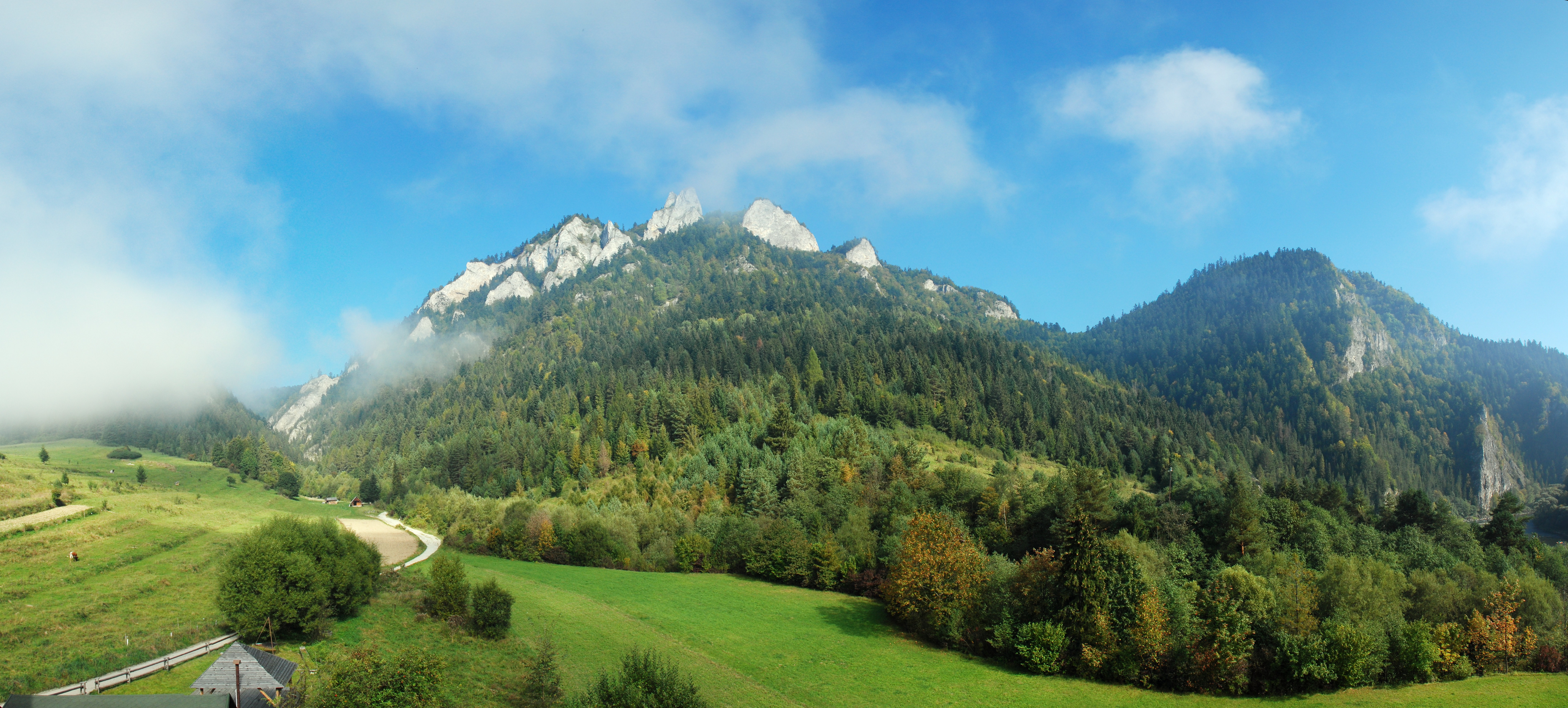
Panorama of Pieniny Mountains with Trzy Korony

== See also ==
- Geography of Poland
- National Parks of Poland
- Giewont
- Rysy

== Notes and references ==
- Józef Nyka, Pieniny. Przewodnik. Wyd. IX. Latchorzew: Wyd. Trawers, 2006. ISBN 83-915859-4-8.
- Anna Siwicka, Pieniński Park Narodowy. Pieniny polskie i słowackie. Mapa 1:25 000, 1:15 000. Kraków: Wyd. Kartograficzne Polkart 2006/07. ISBN 83-87873-07-1.
- Kazimierz Zarzycki, Roman Marcinek, Sławomir Wróbel, Pieniński Park Narodowy. Warszawa, Multico publishing, 2003. ISBN 83-7073-288-7.
