= Sromowce Wyżne =

- Village
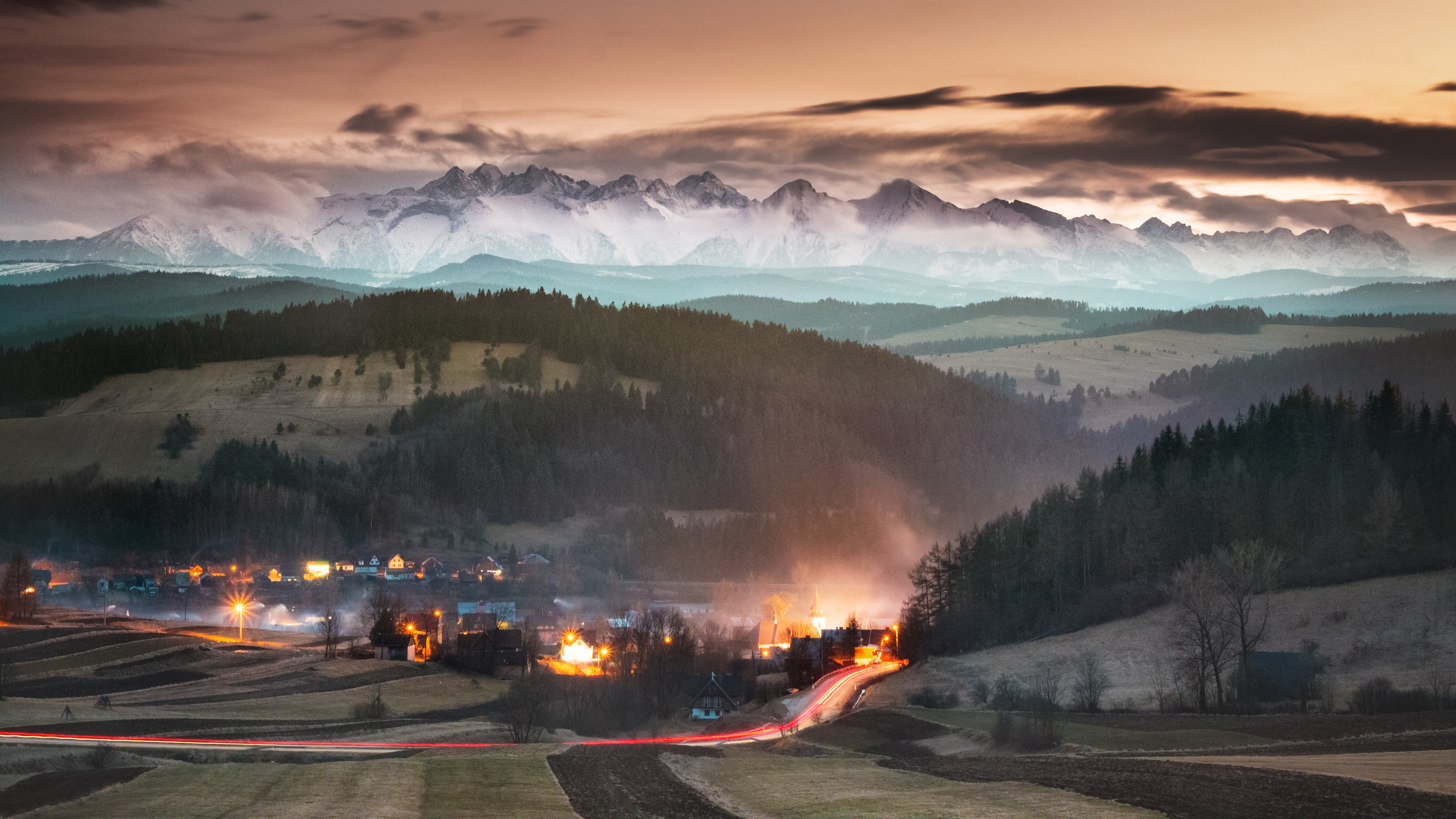

- Location within Poland
- Coordinates: 49°25′N 20°21′E
- Country: Poland
- Voivodeship: Lesser Poland
- County: Nowy Targ
- Gmina: Czorsztyn
- Population: 1,100
- Website: http://sromowce.pl

Sromowce Wyżne [srɔˈmɔft͡sɛ ˈvɨʐnɛ] is a village in the administrative district of Gmina Czorsztyn, within Nowy Targ County, Lesser Poland Voivodeship, in southern Poland, close to the border with Slovakia.

== See also ==
- Trzy Korony massif
