= Sromowce Niżne =

- Village
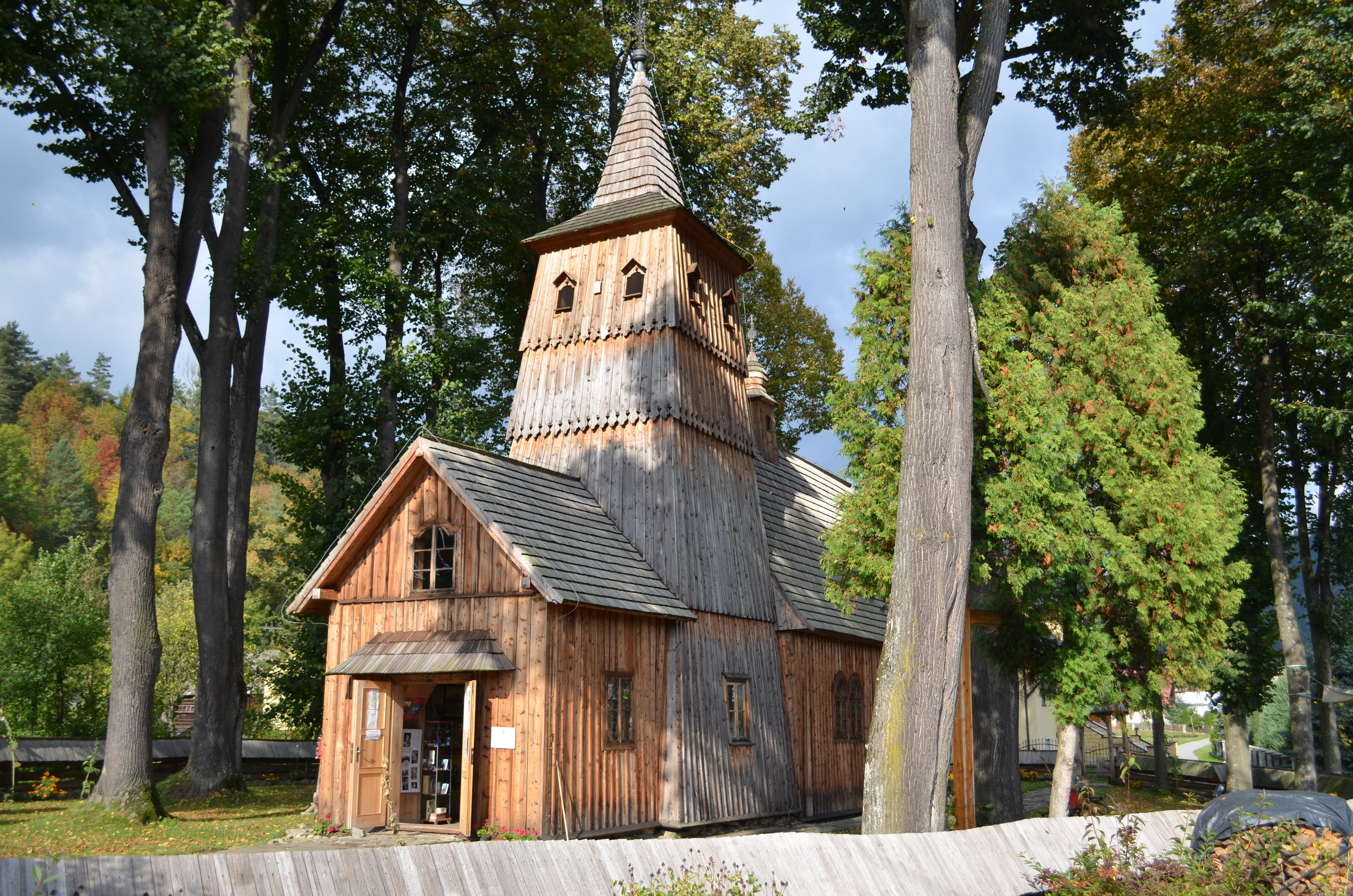
- Saint Catherine Church
- Interactive map of Sromowce Niżne
- Location within Poland
- Coordinates: 49°23′43.62″N 20°24′33.62″E
- Country: Poland
- Voivodeship: Lesser Poland
- County: Nowy Targ
- Gmina: Czorsztyn
- Population: 1,100

Sromowce Niżne [srɔˈmɔft͡sɛ ˈniʐnɛ] is a village in the administrative district of Gmina Czorsztyn, within Nowy Targ County, Lesser Poland Voivodeship, in southern Poland, close to the border with Slovakia.

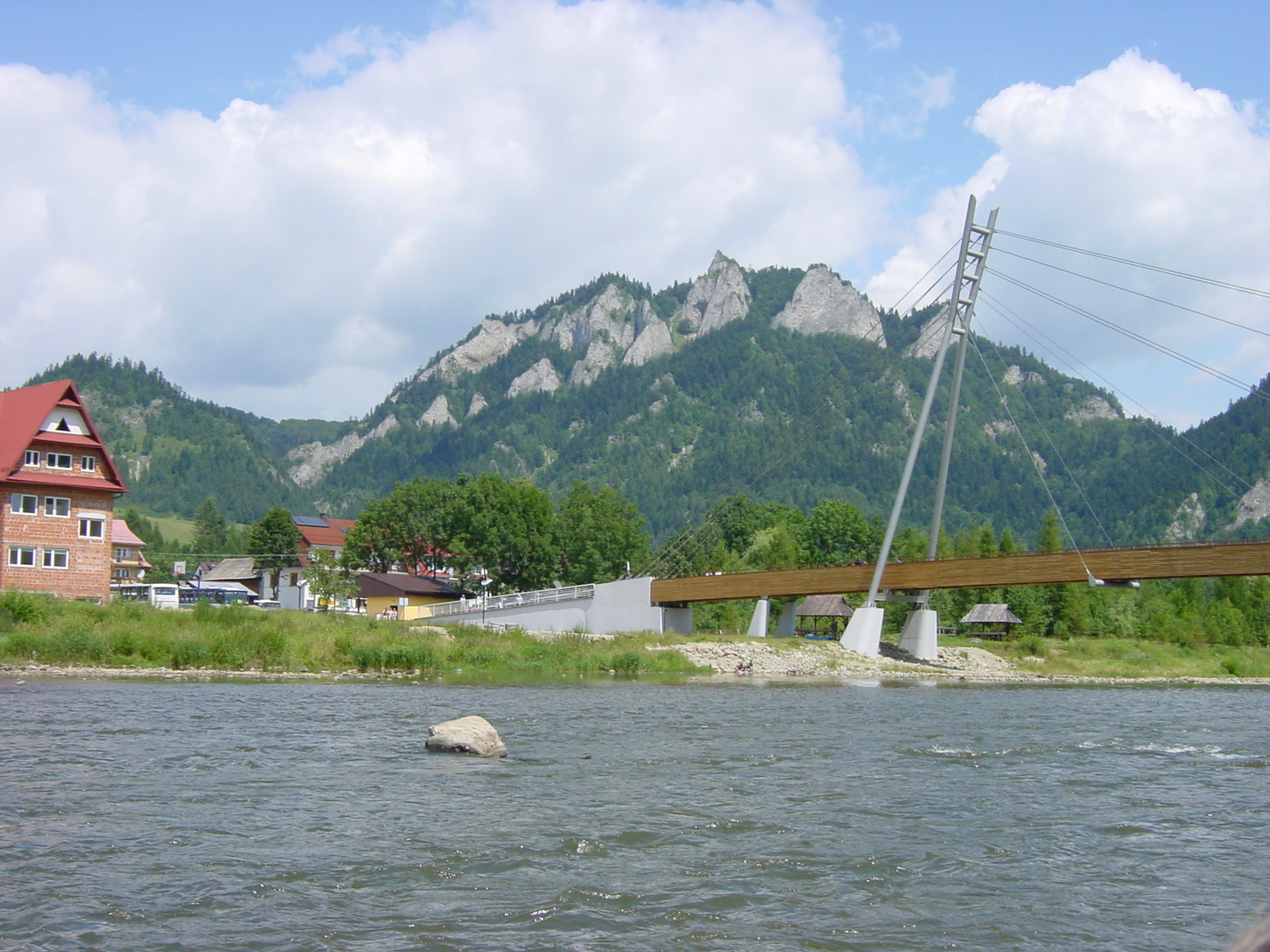
Sromowce Niżne, view of pedestrian bridge leading to border crossing with Slovakia over the Dunajec river

== See also ==
- Trzy Korony massif
- Media related to Sromowce Niżne at Wikimedia Commons
