= Spišská Stará Ves =

- Municipality
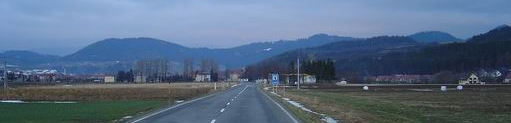
- Panorama of Spišská Stará Ves, with the Pieniny in the background - Slovak and Polish mountains

- Flag Coat of arms

- Location of Spišská Stará Ves in the Prešov Region Location of Spišská Stará Ves in Slovakia
- Coordinates: 49.38°N 20.36°E
- Country: Slovakia
- Region: Prešov Region
- District: Kežmarok District
- First mentioned: 1272

Government
  - Mayor: Jozef Harabin

Area
  - Total: 17.56 km^{2} (6.78 sq mi)
- Elevation: 487 m (1,598 ft)

Population (2025)
  - Total: 2,131
- Time zone: UTC+1 (CET)
  - Summer (DST): UTC+2 (CEST)
- Postal code: 610 1
- Area code: +421 52
- Vehicle registration plate (until 2022): KK
- Website: www.spisskastaraves.sk

Spišská Stará Ves (German: (Zipser) Alt(en)dorf; Hungarian: Szepesófalu or Hungarian: Ófalu; Rusyn: Спіська Стара Вес; Polish: (Stara) Spiska Wieś; Latin: Antiqua Villa; Goral: Golembarg) is a small town and urban municipality in Kežmarok District in the Prešov Region of north Slovakia.

== History ==
In historical records the town was first mentioned in 1272. Before the establishment of independent Czechoslovakia in 1918, Spišská Stará Ves was part of Szepes County within the Kingdom of Hungary. From 1939 to 1945, it was part of the Slovak Republic. On 26 January 1945, the Red Army dislodged the Wehrmacht from Spišská Stará Ves and it was once again part of Czechoslovakia.

== Geography ==
The municipality lies at an altitude of 487 metres (1,598 ft) and covers an area of 17.56 km^{2} (6.78 sq mi) (2025). Spišská Stará Ves is the centre of Zamagurie region and is close to the Dunajec River.

== Population ==
Historical population
Year	Pop.	±%
1970	1,614	—
1980	2,002	+24.0%
1991	2,234	+11.6%
2001	2,355	+5.4%
2011	2,264	−3.9%
2021	2,202	−2.7%
Source: Censuses

Population statistic (10 years)
Year	1995	2005	2015	2025
Count	2328	2335	2278	2131
Difference		+0.30%	−2.44%	−6.45%

Population statistic
Year	2024	2025
Count	2156	2131
Difference		−1.15%

It has a population of 2131 people (31 December 2025).

=== Ethnicity ===
Census 2021 (1+ %)
Ethnicity	Number	Fraction
Slovak	2069	93.96%
Not found out	235	10.67%
Romani	105	4.76%
Polish	25	1.13%
Total	2202	

In year 2021 was 2202 people by ethnicity 2069 as Slovak, 235 as Not found out, 105 as Romani, 25 as Polish, 15 as Rusyn, 7 as Ukrainian, 5 as Czech, 2 as Hungarian, 2 as Other, 2 as English, 1 as Russian, 1 as Austrian, 1 as German, 1 as Canadian, 1 as French and 1 as Bulgarian.

Note on population: The difference values of population numbers in the table "Population statistic" and in the sections "Ethnicity" & "Religion" is caused by the use of various statistical methods.

=== Religion ===
Census 2021 (1+ %)
Religion	Number	Fraction
Roman Catholic Church	1822	82.74%
None	173	7.86%
Not found out	88	4%
Greek Catholic Church	75	3.41%
Total	2202	

In year 2021 was 2202 people by religion 1822 from Roman Catholic Church, 173 from None, 88 from Not found out, 75 from Greek Catholic Church, 13 from Evangelical Church, 7 from Other and not ascertained christian church, 6 from Eastern Orthodox Church, 5 from Ad hoc movements, 4 from Other, 2 from Christian Congregations in Slovakia, 1 from Calvinist Church, 1 from Paganism and natural spirituality, 1 from Jehovah's Witnesses, 1 from Hinduism, 1 from United Methodist Church, 1 from Buddhism and 1 from Apostolic Church.
