= Majere, Kežmarok District =

Majere
- Municipality
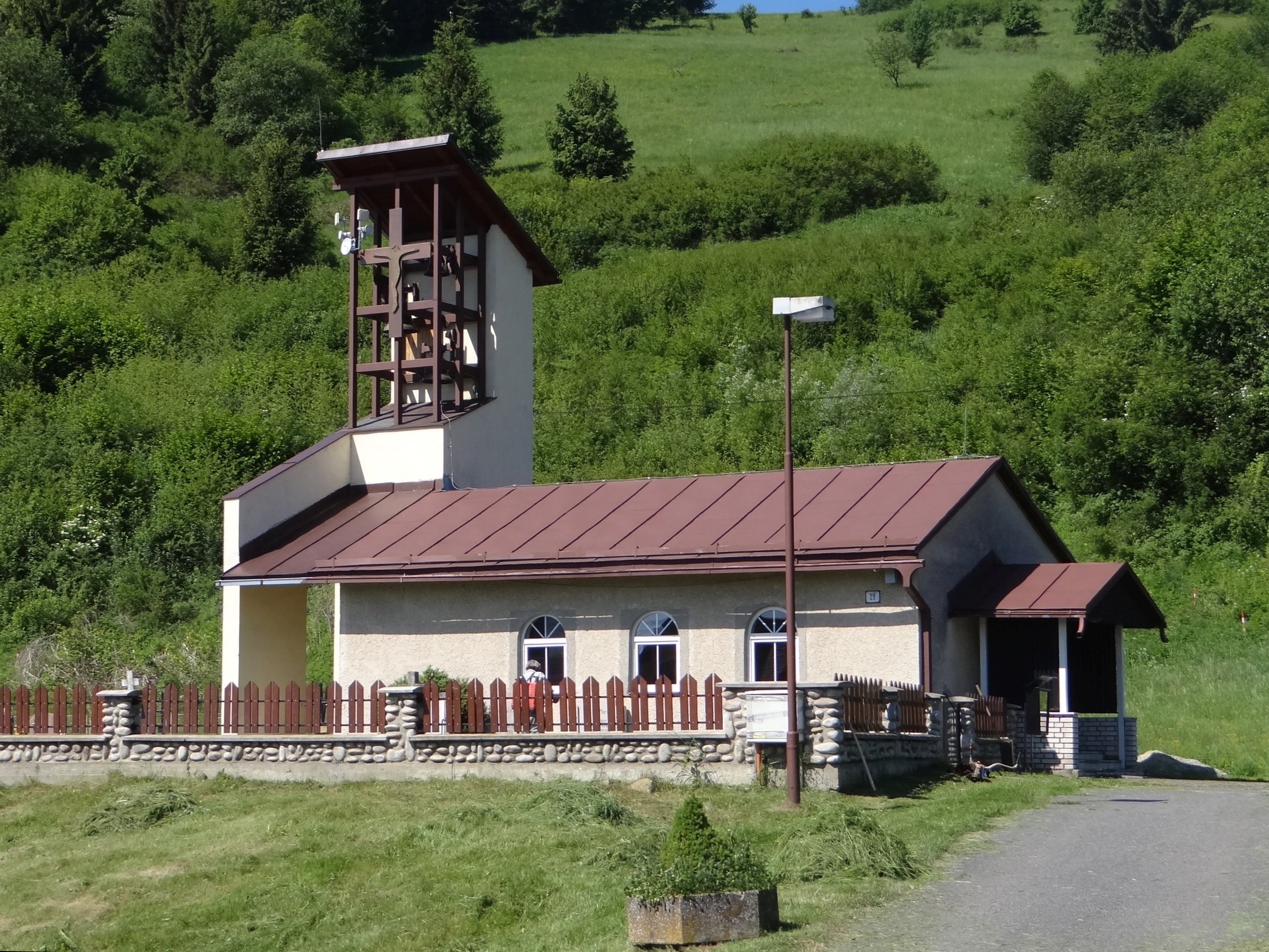

- Flag

- Location of Majere in the Prešov Region Location of Majere in Slovakia
- Coordinates: 49.40°N 20.38°E
- Country: Slovakia
- Region: Prešov Region
- District: Kežmarok District
- First mentioned: 1431

Area
  - Total: 1.35 km^{2} (0.52 sq mi)
- Elevation: 466 m (1,529 ft)

Population (2025)
  - Total: 138
- Time zone: UTC+1 (CET)
  - Summer (DST): UTC+2 (CEST)
- Postal code: 610 1
- Area code: +421 52
- Vehicle registration plate (until 2022): KK
- Website: majere.sk

Majere (until 1948 Vyšné Šváby, German: Oberschwaben, Hungarian: Ómajor, Rusyn: Маєре) is a small village and tiny municipality in Kežmarok District in the Prešov Region of north Slovakia.

== History ==
In historical records the village was first mentioned in 1431. Before the establishment of independent Czechoslovakia in 1918, Vyšné Šváby was part of Szepes County within the Kingdom of Hungary. From 1939 to 1945, it was part of the Slovak Republic. On 26 January 1945, the Red Army dislodged the Wehrmacht from Vyšné Šváby and it was once again part of Czechoslovakia.

== Geography ==
The municipality lies at an altitude of 466 metres (1,529 ft) and covers an area of 1.35 km^{2} (0.52 sq mi) (2025).

== Population ==
Population statistic (10 years)
Year	1995	2005	2015	2025
Count	81	84	107	138
Difference		+3.70%	+27.38%	+28.97%

Population statistic
Year	2024	2025
Count	130	138
Difference		+6.15%

It has a population of 138 people (31 December 2025).

=== Ethnicity ===
Census 2021 (1+ %)
Ethnicity	Number	Fraction
Slovak	109	95.61%
Not found out	14	12.28%
Rusyn	3	2.63%
Polish	3	2.63%
Total	114	

In year 2021 was 114 people by ethnicity 109 as Slovak, 14 as Not found out, 3 as Rusyn, 3 as Polish, 1 as Czech and 1 as German.

Note on population: The difference values of population numbers in the table "Population statistic" and in the sections "Ethnicity" & "Religion" is caused by the use of various statistical methods.

=== Religion ===
Census 2021 (1+ %)
Religion	Number	Fraction
Roman Catholic Church	95	83.33%
Greek Catholic Church	8	7.02%
Not found out	4	3.51%
Evangelical Church	4	3.51%
None	3	2.63%
Total	114	

In year 2021 was 114 people by religion 95 from Roman Catholic Church, 8 from Greek Catholic Church, 4 from Not found out, 4 from Evangelical Church and 3 from None.
