= Jan Talafús =

15th-century Czech military leader

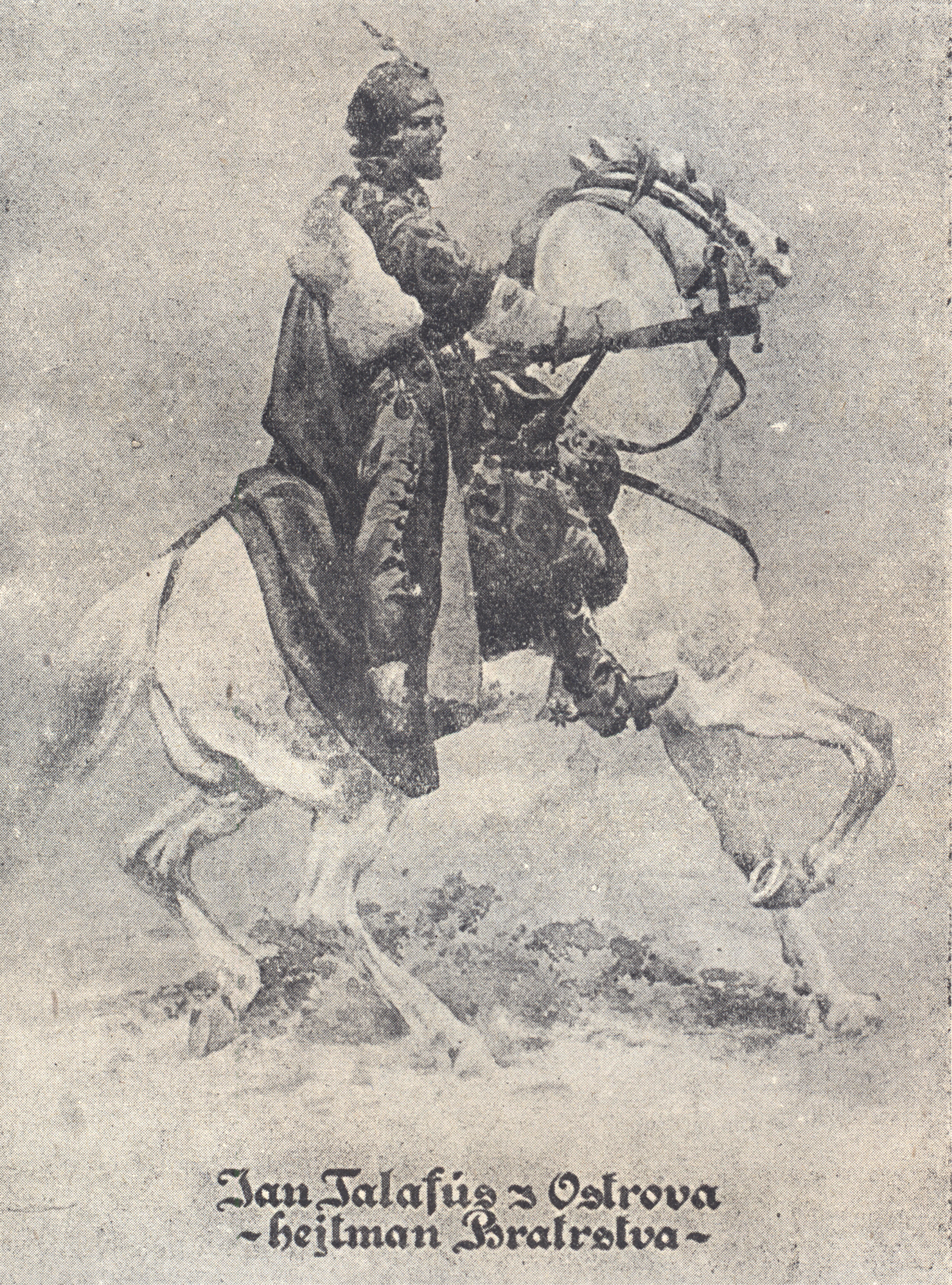
- Painting by Karel Šimůnek
- Born: c. 1410; Ostrov, Bohemia
- Died: Last mentioned in 1475
- Military career
- Rank: Hetman

Jan Talafús (also referred to as Jan Talafús of Ostrov; c. 1410 – after 1475) was a Czech military leader. He was one of the leading hetmans of the Brothers, who operated in the territory of Upper Hungary after the Hussite Wars. Under the command of John Jiskra of Brandýs, alongside Peter Aksamit and other brothers hetmans, he served in the service of the minor king Ladislaus the Posthumous and his mother Elizabeth of Luxembourg. During his foreign service, he participated in most of the important military operations and spent fourteen years serving as hetman in Richnava. After returning to Bohemia, he entered the service of John II of Rosenberg, later then into the army of King George of Poděbrady under the command of Ctibor Tovačovský of Cimburk.

== Early life ==
Jan Talafús was born in a homestead in Ostrov near Vysoké Mýto, Bohemia (now the Czech Republic). The date of his birth has not been preserved in contemporary sources; therefore, Czech historians generally assume it was around 1410. Similarly, it is not documented who his parents were. The closest verifiable ancestor is his grandfather Ješek Talafús from Říčany, and the father of the future hetman was one of his four sons—Jan, Mikuláš, Beneš, or Jiří. It was also the grandfather of Jan Talafús who entered the service of the Lords of Košumberk (later adopting the name Slavatovci), and from them, he was granted the Košumberk part of Ostrov as a manorial estate. Talafús received his education at a school in Luže and later probably at one of the Prague schools.

Along with a general education, he was prepared for military craft and, at the age of 24, participated as a page of Lord Viliam of Chlum and Košumberk in the Battle of Lipany. Around this time, he married a certain Dorota Tehlovcová of Dobříkov, who soon died. His second wife later became the only daughter of Jan Čapek of Sány, Žofia. This marriage brought him the Valdštejn Castle as a dowry, but he soon lost it. In 1439, he took possession of the Ostrov estate and was elevated to the noble status. In 1437, his father-in-law acquired the castle Hukvaldy with six villages, and further the towns of Brušperk, Ostrava, and Příbor. and by 1445, at the latest, he transferred them to his son-in-law, who added the surname "from Hukvaldy.

== As a Hetman of the Brothers ==
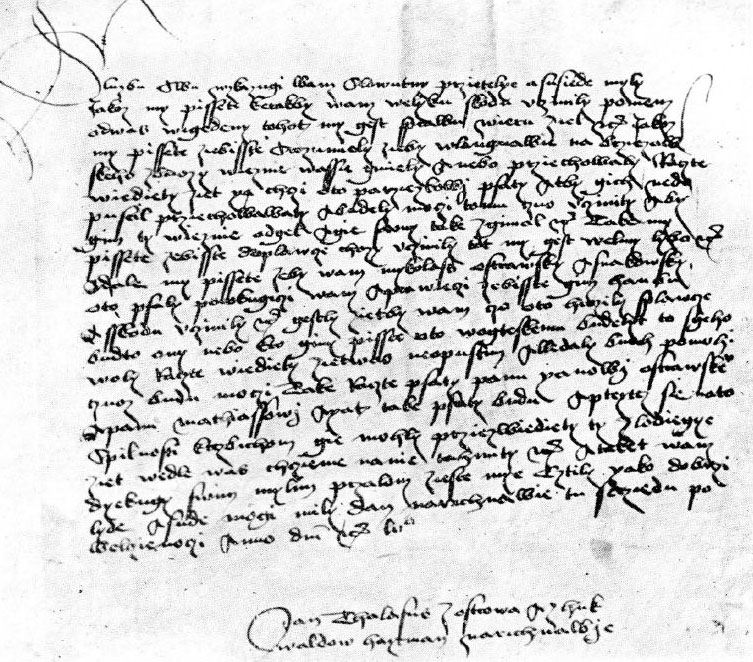
A letter from Jan Talafús to the inhabitants of Bardejov from 1455. The signature at the end of the letter reads: Jan Talafús of Ostrov and Hukvaldy, hetman of Richnava. Talafús writes to the Bardejov residents regarding their people imprisoned in Langava. He also offers them protection against the Plaveč garrison and suggests campaigns against the Plaveč defenders. The original is stored in the city archive of Bardejov

In 1440, Jan Talafús participated in the Čáslav Assembly, where the security of eastern Bohemia was discussed. The same year, he sold the manor of Šnakov for 220 kop grosz and in the fall, he left for Upper Hungary. Here, he entered the army of the highest hetman John Jiskra of Brandýs, who, in the service of Queen Elizabeth of Luxembourg, widow of Albrecht II of Austria, defended her son's Ladislaus the Posthumous claim to the Hungarian throne. The military intervention was justified because the Hungarian nobility denied the rights of the two-year-old heir and elected the Polish king Władysław III, supported by John Hunyadi and Talafús's father-in-law Jan Čapek of Sány (who was appointed the highest field hetman of the Polish army in Hungary during 1442–1444).

His first major actions took place in 1441, when he helped John Jiskra seize towns in Spiš and Šariš and free Košice, which was besieged by the Poles; after a successful operation, he briefly became the hetman of Košice. In 1442, he was appointed hetman of Banská Štiavnica, which was looted during his absence, but upon his return, remained in the hands of the brotherhoods. In the autumn of that year, he unexpectedly captured the Hungarian city Eger, where the envoy of Władysław III of Poland was staying, returning to Poland. During the raid, he seized many important prisoners and rich spoils. On the way back, the heavily loaded wagons slowed him down, and he was pursued by the Hungarians. A fierce clash ensued, during which many men died, and Talafús was forced to retreat. He was taken prisoner and imprisoned in Eger. He was released after 3 October of that year. Two months later, he helped capture the castle of Richnava, where he was assigned to the command of the new fortress hetman, Slovak Ján of Perene. From this position, he conducted sporadic raids into enemy territory, especially around Tokaj. In 1445, he was appointed hetman of the castle of Chmeľov, and three years later, he received the hetman position at Richnava, where he spent the next fourteen years of his life. In 1449, Talafús, alongside John Jiskra of Brandýs, participated in the Battle of Somoši and in 1451, fought among 3,000 brothers who defeated about 20,000 Hungarians at the Battle of Lučenec.

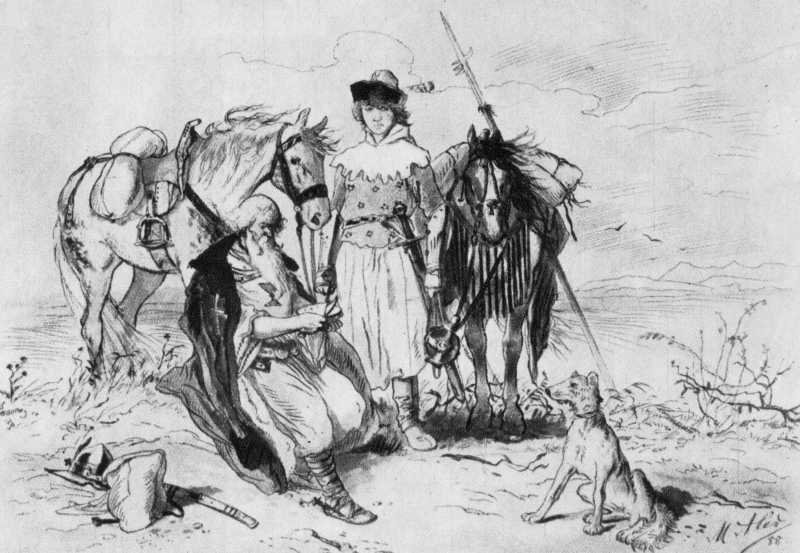
Mikoláš Aleš painting titled: "Jan Talafús of Ostrov returning to Bohemia"

In 1453, the Bohemian king Ladislaus the Posthumous was crowned King of Hungary. Immediately afterward, he demanded John Jiskra return all the captured castles and then released him from court. Most of Jiskra's subordinates did not obey the order to surrender the acquired estates. In February of that year, Jan Talafús participated in the Spiš Assembly in Levoča, where the nobility discussed measures against bandit gangs. During one of the military incursions in the following months, he was severely wounded. In 1455, King Władysław recalled John Jiskra back into his service and decided to keep all the acquired property in the hands of the brotherhoods. However, after his death in 1457, Matthias Corvinus became the king of Hungary, who turned against the brothers with armed force. His army soon marched to the castle and the nearby town of Šarišský Potok, which at that time was held by Jan Talafús and Peter Aksamit. The Ostrov native, along with three hundred horsemen, launched a counterattack, but most of his men fell into captivity during the raid. He himself managed to escape by fleeing to Šariš Castle. From there, he, together with Peter Aksamit and other hetmans, set out back toward Šarišský Potok and raided the territory between Bodrog and Tisza. On 21 May, they were ambushed by opponents at Battle of Blatný Potok and a short battle ensued in the fields around the town. Of the 2,000 brothers, 600 were killed, and 200 were captured on the spot. Others attempted to escape, but after persistent pursuit, about two hundred managed to break free. During the fight, Talafús's friend Peter Aksamit was killed. He himself, along with his fourteen horsemen, escaped by fleeing to Šarišský Hrad. Soon after, he was expelled from this fortress to Breznica, from where he retreated back to Richnava.

In 1460, Talafús again joined John Jiskra of Brandýs's army, who, with the help of George of Poděbrady and remnants of Aksamit's troops, continued fighting in Spiš against the Hungarian king, whose troops aimed to expel the remaining brotherhoods from the country. Until March 1462, Talafús managed to defend Richnava, but then he was captured again. The following year, John Jiskra and Matthias Corvinus made peace, and Talafús, along with Mikuláš Brcala of Dobrý, former hetman of Kežmarok, and Bartoš of Hartvíkovice, received a settlement of 16,000 ducats. The last mention of Talafús in Hungary dates to 31 August 1463. He returned to Hukvaldy after twenty-three years abroad. According to legend, due to fluctuating war fortunes, he arrived from Hungary poor and without resources. Since then, a Czech proverb has become popular: "poor as Talafús."

== Last mentions ==
It is likely that in 1465, Talafús became widowed and entered the royal army under John II of Rosenberg, who fought in Moravia during 1464–1465 against the pope and part of the Catholic nobility. After his commander switched sides, Jan Talafús entered direct service of King George of Poděbrady. Under Ctibor Tovačovský of Cimburk's command, he participated in an expedition to Poland in 1466 and was directly involved in fighting at Wrocław. In 1467, he fought at the Battle of Pačkova. Later, he returned to his estates. It is likely that after the Hungarian army's invasion of Bohemia, he also took part in the conflicts that flared in 1469. After the enemies retreated from the land, he probably returned to Hukvaldy. The last written record of him dates to 1475. One of the entries in the Book of Fines and Discoveries suggests that Talafús, heir of Čapek of Sány, was still alive. When and where he died remains unknown.
