= Peter Aksamit of Liderovice =

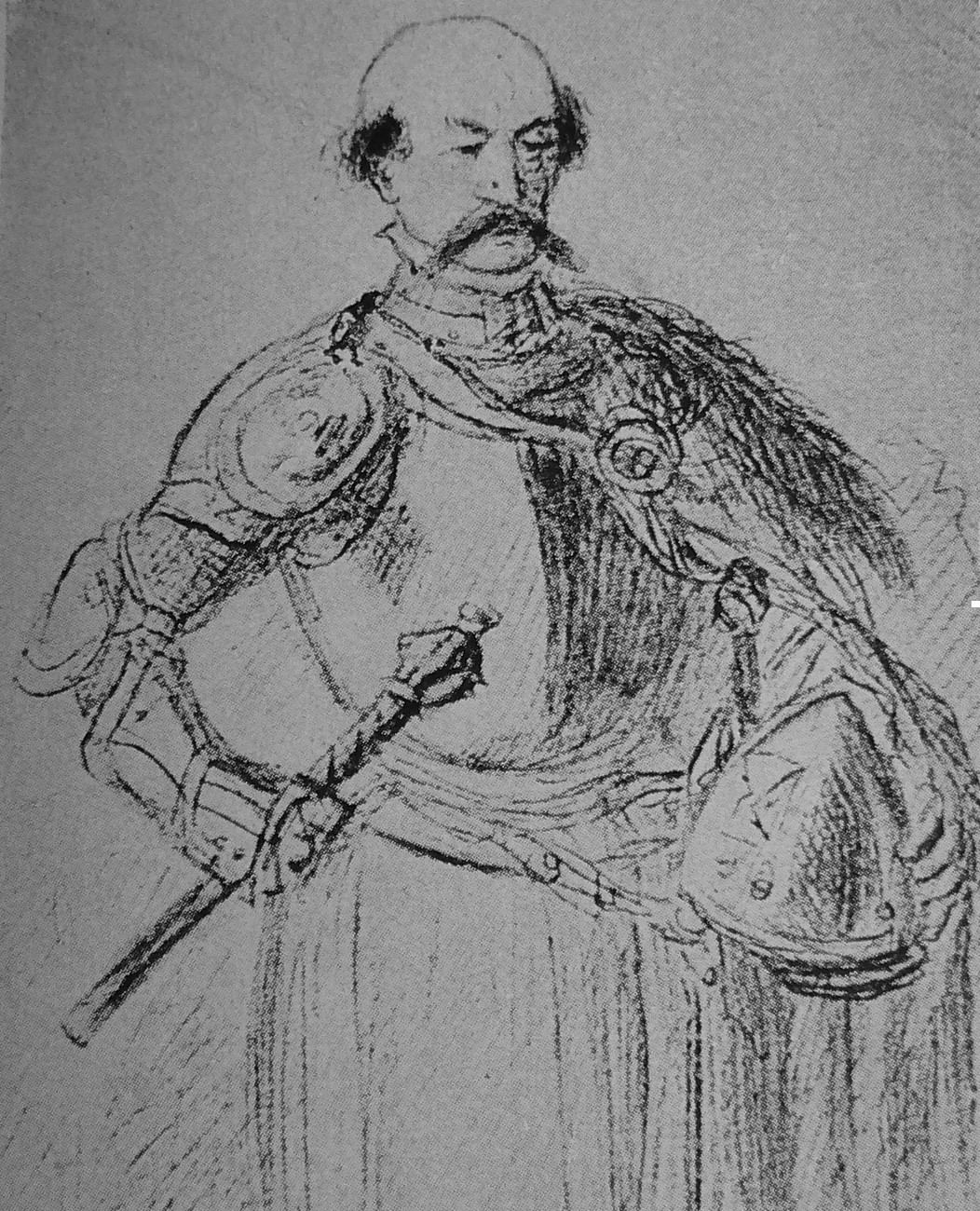
- Peter Aksamit in the illustration by Mikoláš Aleš
- Born: c. 1400; Liderovice, Kingdom of Bohemia
- Died: 21 May 1458; Sárospatak, Kingdom of Hungary
- Offices: hetman of Bratříci

Peter Aksamit of Liderovice (Czech: Petr Aksamit z Liderovic; c. 1400 – 21 May 1458) was a Czech nobleman, Hussite and hetman of Bratříci (former Hussite warriors).

== Life ==
Peter Aksamit was probably born around 1400 in Liderovice (today part of Chotoviny), in southern Bohemia. According to some sources, he took part in the Battle of Lipany. However, his activities in his youth are not very well known. Around 1440, he went to Upper Hungary, where from 1443, under the command of John Jiskra of Brandýs – a Hussite general, a subject of the Hungarian king Ladislaus the Posthumous, he served as captain of Spiš Castle. In 1451, his troops numbered around 5,000 soldiers. They plundered many settlements and monasteries – the Camaldolese in Červený Kláštor and the Premonstratensians in Jasov. In the years 1447–1451, they also regularly attacked trade caravans heading to Poland. At that time, the papal legate Aeneas Silvius Piccolomini (future Pope Pius II) wrote about him: "He is a Czech from lowly parents", but at the same time he adds "He is nevertheless a brave man, talented not only in dexterity, but also in mental balance, hard-working, not avoiding work but also danger". In 1453, Aksamit renounced obedience to Jiskra and gained independence. This decision resulted in sending Hungarian troops of Ladislaus Hunyadi against him, which a few months later besieged and captured his previous seat – Spiš Castle. However, he soon managed to reach an agreement with the Hungarians and, as a royal subject, was appointed captain at the castle in Plavec. After the death of Ladislaus the Posthumous, he supported the election of Matthias Corvinus to the Hungarian throne, but came into conflict with him, which ended with his troops participating in the Battle of Sárospatak. The battle took place on May 21, 1458, and ended in a defeat for the Hussite forces. Peter Aksamit himself, who commanded a 600-strong unit of Bratříci, was also killed in the battle. It is likely that Aksamit's troops participated in the Battle of Sárospatak by accident, and the commander himself was heading with his troops on a plundering expedition in the area of the Tisza River.

== Commemoration ==
The longest cave in the Pieniny Mountains is called Aksamitka. It was named in memory of Peter Aksamit's troops stationed in nearby Haligovce, who – as Onufry Trembecki reported in 1861 – was supposed to have ... his main maidan here, from where he kept the entire Hungarian foothills at bay. The Hungarian governor, Zapolya, with a general levy, managed to subdue him only after a second attempt. Near Haligovce there is also a mountain of the same name, on the top of which in 1458 there was supposed to be a camp and the Bratříci main base of operations.

== Nickname ==
Peter Aksamit probably gained his nickname because of his love of aristocratic clothing. According to another version, he gained it in memory of taking a velvet coat from his Polish master. During his life, he signed as: "Peter Aksamit from Kosov, commander-in-chief of the Bratříci, residing in the Zelená Hora camp near Hrabušice and at the Plaveč Castle".
