= Jan Čapek of Sány =

Czech Hussite noble and general (c. 1390 – c. 1452)

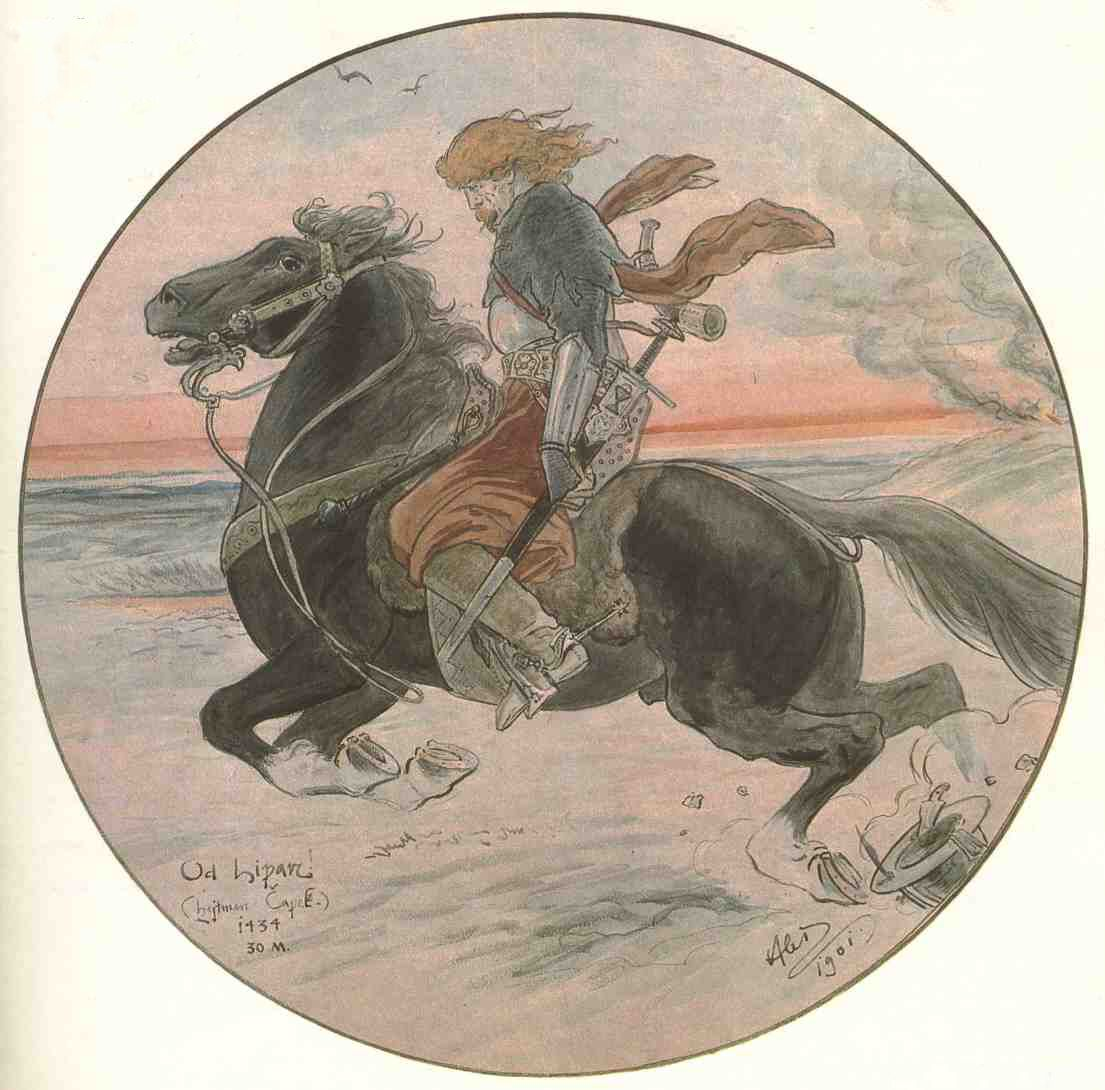
Jan Čapek of Sány depicted by Mikoláš Aleš (1901)

Jan Čapek of Sány (Czech: Jan Čapek ze Sán; c. 1390, Sány – c. 1452, probably in Hukvaldy) was a Czech Hussite noble, general of Władysław III of Poland.

== Biography ==
He fought as a cavalry commander at the Battle of Lipany in 1434, and has been condemned for fleeing the field.

Čapek was first mentioned in Hungarian sources as a leader of Władysław’s Hungarian-Polish army, which around 15 June 1440 occupied Győr, a territory belonged to Elizabeth of Luxemburg and her son, Ladislaus the Posthumous. He might be the leader of the army when Władysław crossed the borders of Hungary for the crowning ceremony, as he was the elected king of Hungary at this time.

He took part at the war against Ottomans in 1443, but he was not mentioned as a participant of the Battle of Varna, where the king died. He returned to Moravia, where he owned the castle of Hukvaldy. He probably died in 1452. A record from 1453 states that Jan Čapek's widow sold the Hukvaldy estate to her son-in-law Jan Talafús.

== Sources ==
- Papajík: Jan Čapek: David Papajík: Jan Čapek ze Sán cseh nemes és szerepe a magyar koronáért folytatott harcban (1440–1443). Aetas, XXVIII. évf. 2013. 1. 128–136. pp
