= Ostrov (Chrudim District) =

- Municipality
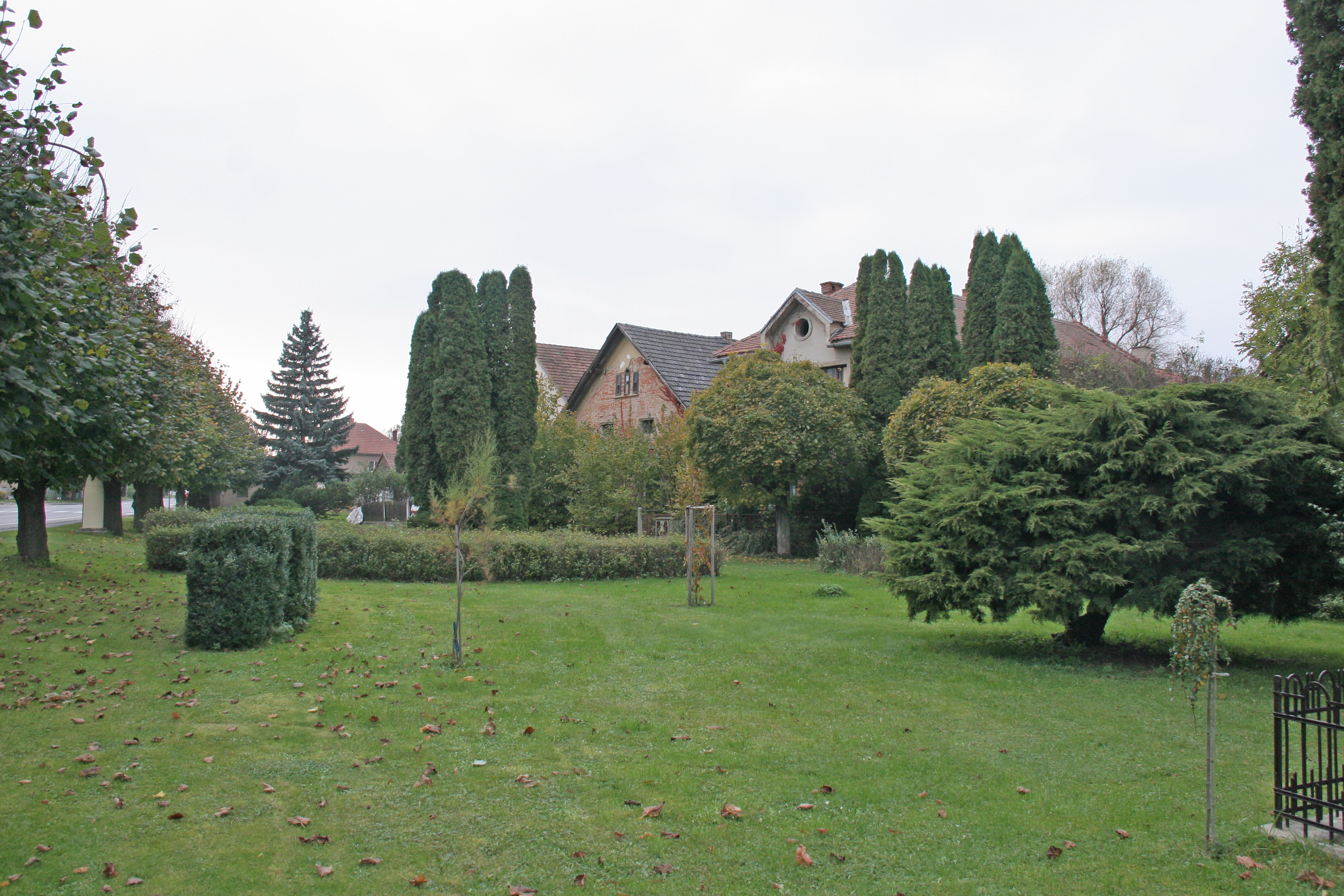
- Centre of Ostrov

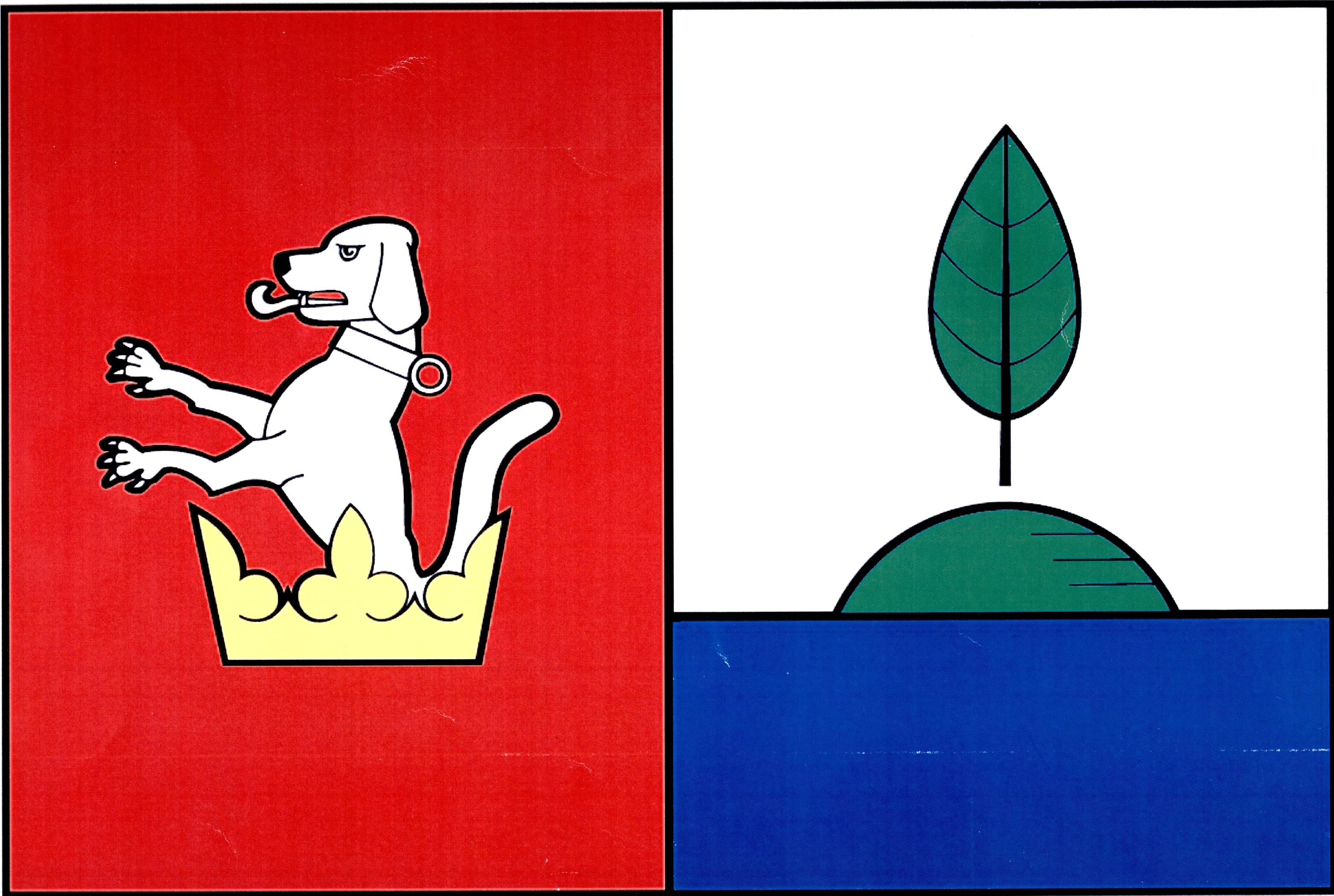
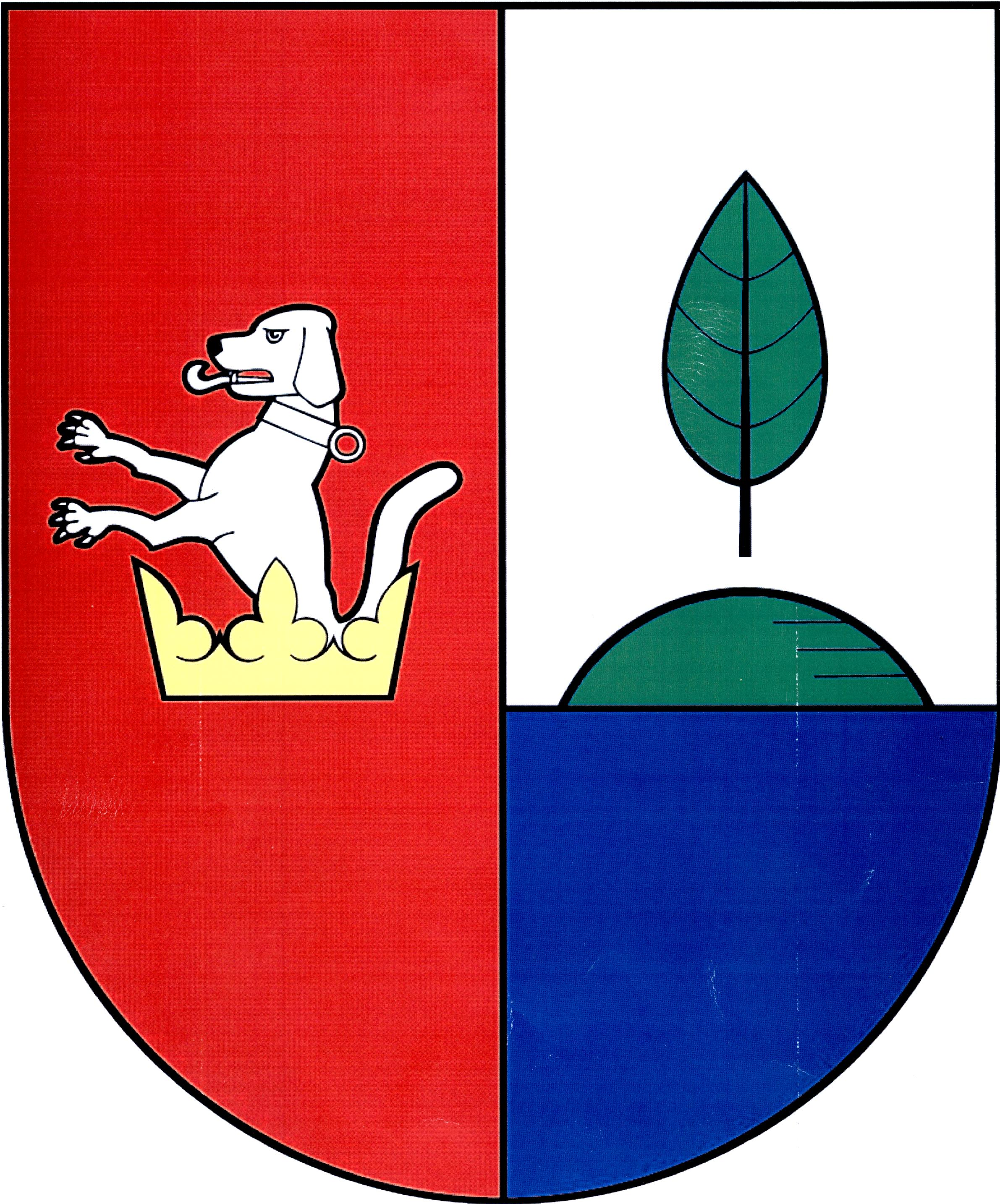
- Flag Coat of arms

- Location in the Czech Republic
- Coordinates: 49°58′22″N 16°1′49″E
- Country: Czech Republic
- Region: Pardubice
- District: Chrudim
- First mentioned: 1318

Area
  - Total: 4.18 km^{2} (1.61 sq mi)
- Elevation: 262 m (860 ft)

Population (2026-01-01)
  - Total: 180
  - Density: 43/km^{2} (110/sq mi)
- Time zone: UTC+1 (CET)
  - Summer (DST): UTC+2 (CEST)
- Postal code: 538 63
- Website: www.obec-ostrov.cz

Ostrov is a municipality and village in Chrudim District in the Pardubice Region of the Czech Republic. It has about 200 inhabitants.

== Etymology ==
In Czech, the name means 'island'. It is a common Czech toponym, which sometimes originated literally (solid ground among swamps), but often originated figuratively (e.g. an island of treeless land among forests, etc.).

== Geography ==
Ostrov is located about 17 kilometres (11 mi) east of Chrudim and 19 km (12 mi) southeast of Pardubice. It lies on the border between the East Elbe Table and Svitavy Uplands. The highest point is at 283 m (928 ft) above sea level. The Loučná River flows along the northern municipal border. The stream Ostrovský potok originates in the municipality, supplies a system of two fishponds in the village, and then flows into the Loučná.

== History ==
The first written mention of Ostrov is from 1318. In the 14th and 15th centuries, a fortress stood here. From 1493, Ostrov belonged to the Košumberk estate. Later it was annexed to the Chroustovice estate.

== Demographics ==
Historical population

| Year | Pop. | ±% |
|---|---|---|
| 1869 | 353 | — |
| 1880 | 387 | +9.6% |
| 1890 | 374 | −3.4% |
| 1900 | 355 | −5.1% |
| 1910 | 373 | +5.1% |

| Year | Pop. | ±% |
|---|---|---|
| 1921 | 346 | −7.2% |
| 1930 | 322 | −6.9% |
| 1950 | 237 | −26.4% |
| 1961 | 265 | +11.8% |
| 1970 | 219 | −17.4% |

| Year | Pop. | ±% |
|---|---|---|
| 1980 | 214 | −2.3% |
| 1991 | 160 | −25.2% |
| 2001 | 181 | +13.1% |
| 2011 | 224 | +23.8% |
| 2021 | 193 | −13.8% |

Source: Censuses

== Transport ==
The I/17 road from Chrudim to Vraclav runs through Ostrov. The unfinished D35 motorway (part of the European route E442), which connects the D11 motorway with Olomouc, runs through the northern part of the municipality.

== Sights ==
Among the protected cultural monuments in the municipality are an archaeological site, where the local fortress stood, and a conciliation cross of unknown age.

== Notable people ==
- Jan Talafús (c. 1410 – c. 1480s), military leader
