= Plaveč, Stará Ľubovňa District =

Village and municipality in Slovakia

Plaveč
- Municipality
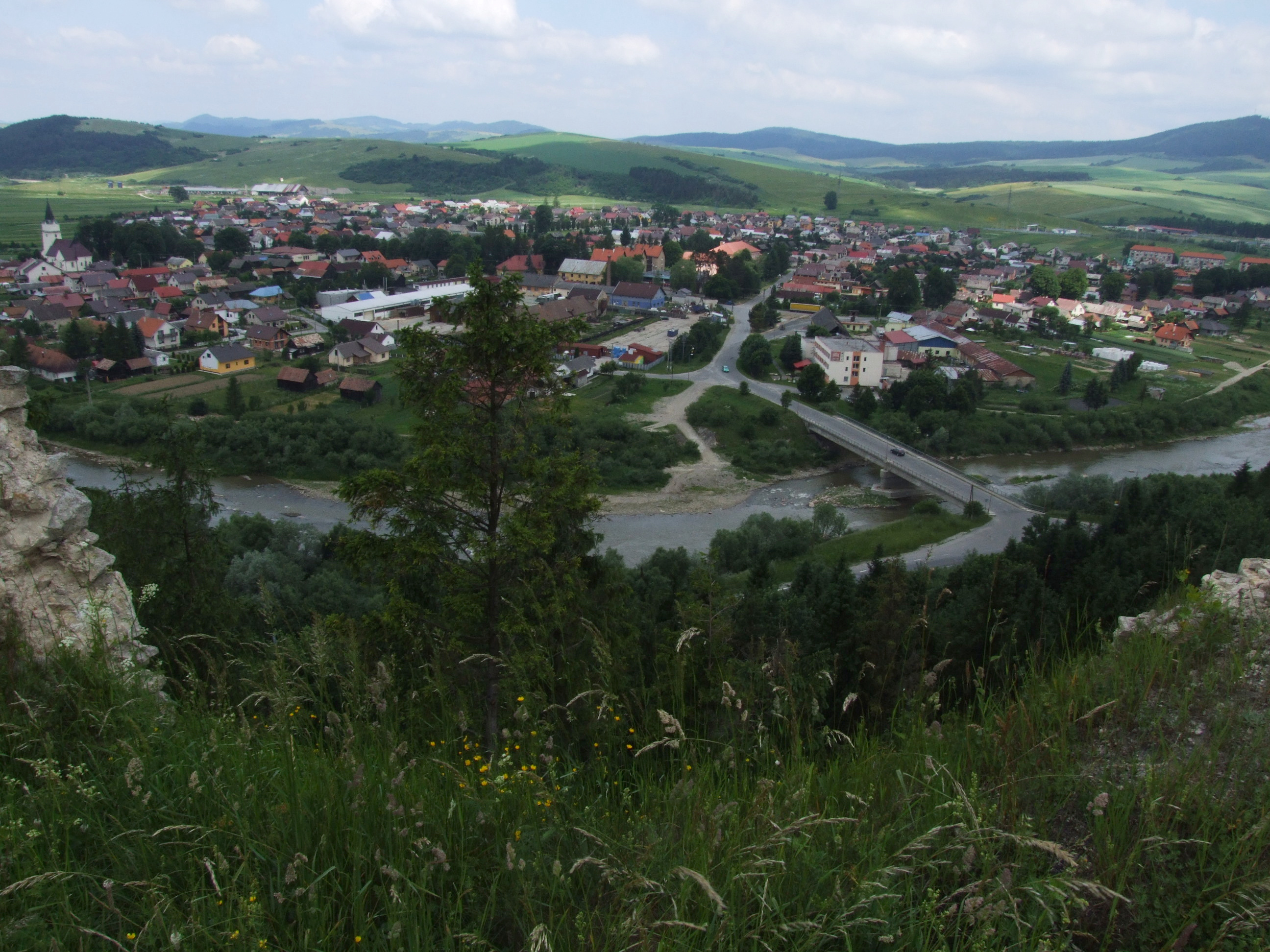

- Flag

- Location of Plaveč in the Prešov Region Location of Plaveč in Slovakia
- Coordinates: 49°15′41″N 20°50′28″E
- Country: Slovakia
- Region: Prešov Region
- District: Stará Ľubovňa District
- First mentioned: 1287

Area
  - Total: 16.68 km^{2} (6.44 sq mi)
- Elevation: 501 m (1,644 ft)

Population (2025)
  - Total: 1,773
- Time zone: UTC+1 (CET)
  - Summer (DST): UTC+2 (CEST)
- Postal code: 654 4
- Area code: +421 52
- Vehicle registration plate (until 2022): SL
- Website: plavec.sk

Plaveč (German: Plautsch; Hungarian: Palocsa; Rusyn: Плавеч; Polish: Pławiec) is a village and municipality in Stará Ľubovňa District in the Prešov Region of northern Slovakia.

== Etymology ==
Plavec (Polovtsian in Slovak) → Plaveč.

== History ==
In historical records the village was first mentioned in 1287. The ruins of the 13th century Plaveč Castle lie above the town, after a fire in 1856. Before the establishment of independent Czechoslovakia in 1918, Plaveč was part of Sáros County within the Kingdom of Hungary. From 1939 to 1945, it was part of the Slovak Republic. On 23 January 1945, the Red Army dislodged the Wehrmacht from Plaveč and it was once again part of Czechoslovakia.

== Geography ==
The municipality lies at an altitude of 501 metres (1,644 ft) and covers an area of 16.68 km^{2} (6.44 sq mi) (2025).

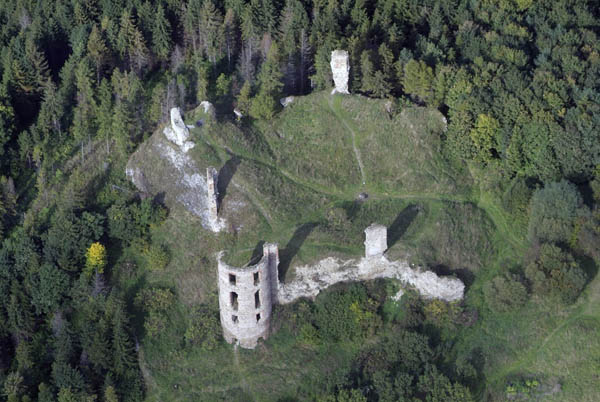

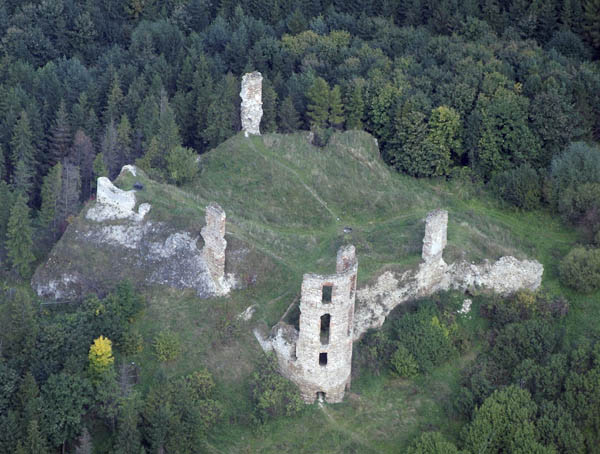

== Population ==
Population statistic (10 years)
Year	1995	2005	2015	2025
Count	1848	1852	1829	1773
Difference		+0.21%	−1.24%	−3.06%

Population statistic
Year	2024	2025
Count	1775	1773
Difference		−0.11%

It has a population of 1773 people (31 December 2025).

=== Ethnicity ===
Census 2021 (1+%)
Ethnicity	Number	Fraction
Slovak	1727	96.69%
Not found out	72	4.03%
Rusyn	23	1.28%
Total	1786	

In year 2021 was 1786 people by ethnicity 1727 as Slovak, 72 as Not found out, 23 as Rusyn, 4 as Czech, 4 as Ukrainian, 3 as German, 2 as Other, 1 as Russian and 1 as Polish.

Note on population: The difference values of population numbers in the table "Population statistic" and in the sections "Ethnicity" & "Religion" is caused by the use of various statistical methods.

=== Religion ===
Census 2021 (1+%)
Religion	Number	Fraction
Roman Catholic Church	1554	87.01%
Greek Catholic Church	119	6.66%
Not found out	62	3.47%
None	38	2.13%
Total	1786	

In year 2021 was 1786 people by religion 1554 from Roman Catholic Church, 119 from Greek Catholic Church, 62 from Not found out, 38 from None, 4 from Eastern Orthodox Church, 3 from Evangelical Church, 1 from Jewish community, 1 from Calvinist Church, 1 from Jehovah's Witnesses, 1 from Islam, 1 from Buddhism and 1 from Ad hoc movements.
