= Plaveč Castle =

Ruined castle in northern Slovakia

- Hrad Plaveč (Slovak); Palocsai vár (Hungarian)
- Slovakia; Near Plaveč in Slovakia
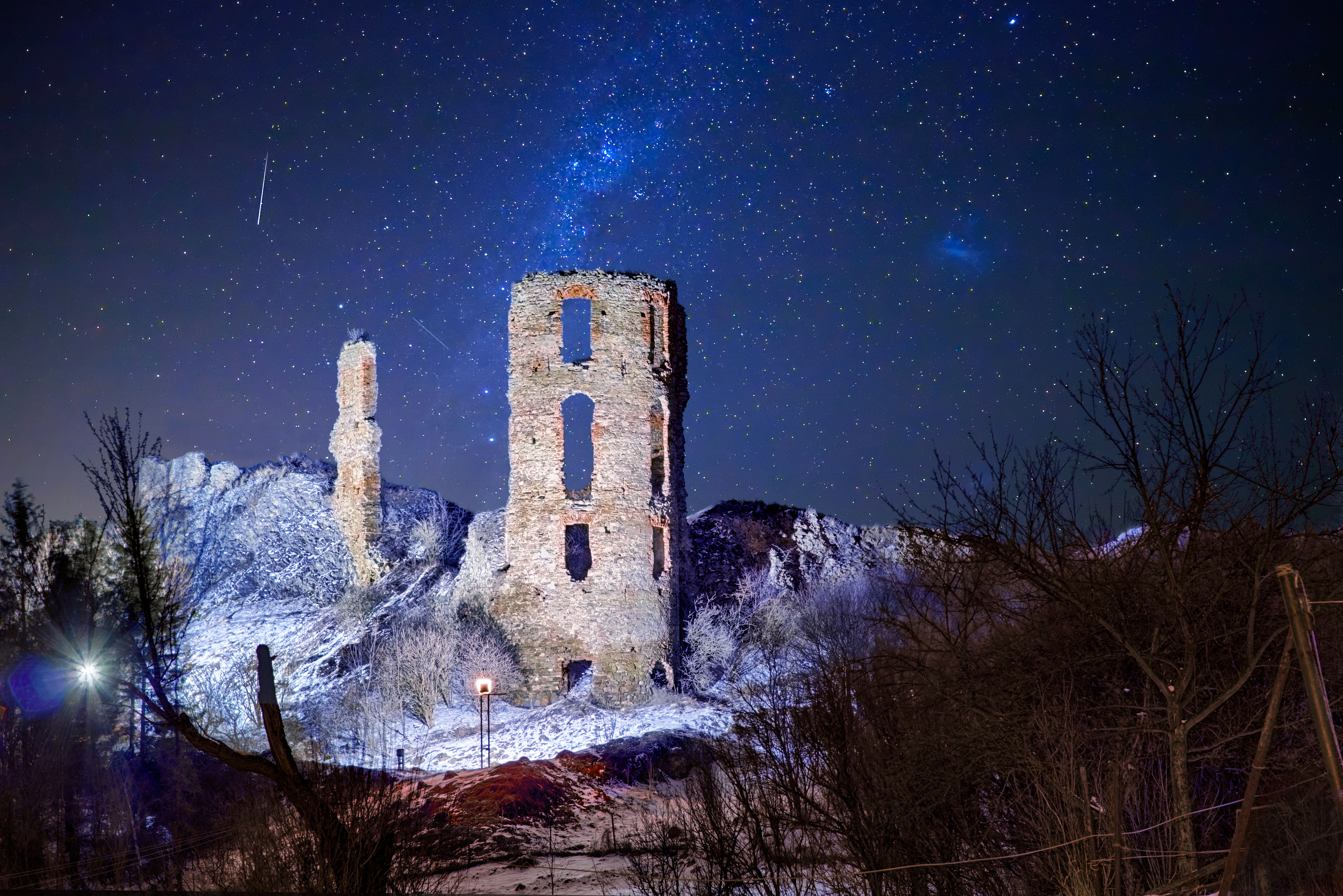

Site information
- Type: hilltop castle
- Condition: ruined

Location
- Coordinates: 49°15′19″N 20°50′52″E
- Area: 2,154 m^{2} (23,190 sq ft)

Site history
- Built: by 1294
- Built for: Ditrich (or his son Arnold) from Spiš
- In use: 1856
- Materials: stone
- Fate: ruin preserved

The Plaveč castle (Hrad Plaveč (Slovak) or Plavečský hrad (Slovak), Palocsai vár (Hungarian)) is the ruins of a hilltop castle above the village of Plaveč in north-eastern Slovakia.

== Name ==
The name is said to derive from the Slavic name of the Cumans (in today's Slovak Plavci), who were invited by Hungarian kings in the 11th and 12th centuries to monitor the borders of the nascent Hungarian state.

== History ==
The castle was first mentioned in writing in 1294 as Palocha and was built by a certain Ditrich (or his son Arnold) from Spiš to secure a ford on the road to Poland. The border castle became royal property and was given to the Drugeth family by Charles I in 1317. After the Drugeth family died out, the Bebek family received the castle from King Sigismund of Luxembourg in 1366. Around 1427, the Bebeks owned the entire territory of the castle.

Between 1449 and 1458, the castle was ruled by the Hussite Bohemian brothers and their leader Petr Aksamit. After the brothers were expelled by the Zápolya family, they kept the castle until 1505, when the widow of Stephan Zápolya gave it to the Horváth family, which was henceforth known as Horváth-Palocsay. This family had the castle rebuilt in the 16th century in the Renaissance style, followed by another extensive reconstruction in the 17th century, the result of which was a residential castle that replaced the medieval fortress. As a result, it was spared from being razed in 1715. After the last conversion in 1830, the residential part was given the appearance of a Classicist castle. The entire complex fell victim to a fire in 1856 and the Palocsay family died out a year later. The abandoned castle slowly fell into disrepair until the walls of the former palace collapsed in the 1990s, leaving only small parts of the wall of the residential area and a bastion.

== Current state ==
Since 2014, the castle has been renovated and partially rebuilt.
