= Brothers (1445–1467) =

Independent units composed of former Hussite fighters

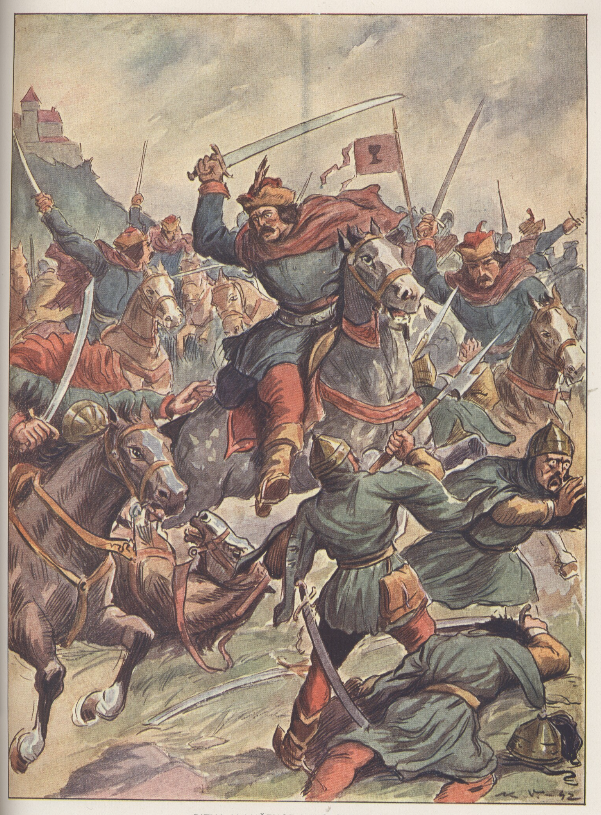
The Battle of Lučenac in an illustration by Karel Vítek

Brothers (Czech: bratříci, Slovak: bratríci, Polish: bracia) were independent units composed of former Hussite fighters operating in the years 1445–1467 in the territory of present-day Slovakia, Moravia, northern Austria and southern Poland.

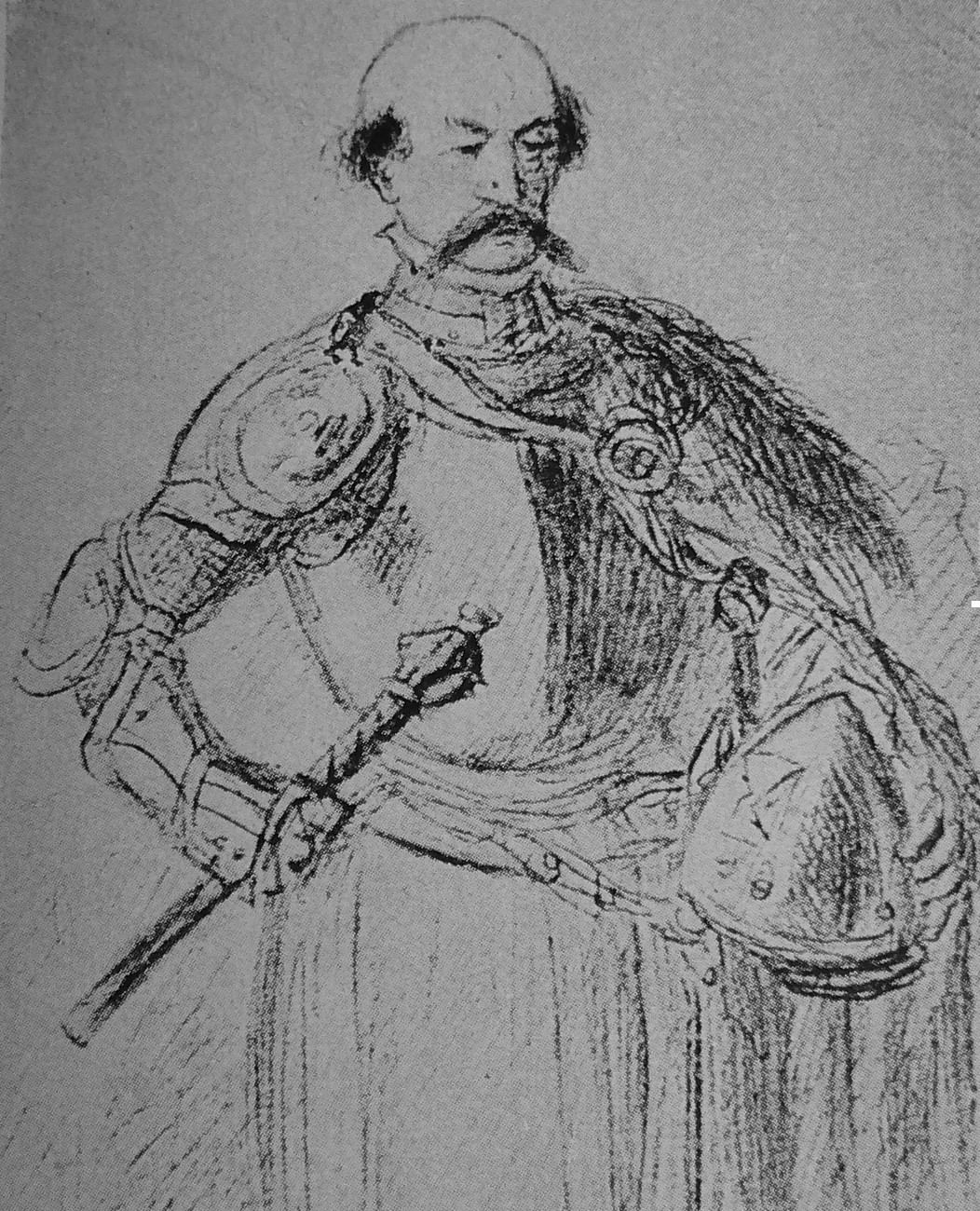
Hetman of the Brothers Peter Aksamit in an illustration by Mikoláš Aleš

The Brothers were an anti-feudal group (according to some sources, they can be considered the progenitors of the anarchist movement) brought to the northern region of the Kingdom of Hungary (roughly the territory of present-day Slovakia) from the Kingdom of Bohemia by John Jiskra of Brandýs. Their core was made up of Czech Hussite fighters (mainly Taborites), but their ranks also included Slovak peasants, the urban poor, representatives of the lower clergy, and even some impoverished feudal lords. The formation's greatest development occurred after 1453, when it was commanded by Peter Aksamit of Liderovice, and his troops numbered about 15–20 thousand soldiers. At that time, they plundered many settlements and monasteries – Camaldolese in Červený Kláštor and Premonstratensian in Jasov, and in the years 1447-1451 they also regularly attacked trade caravans heading to Poland. In 1451, the Brothers fought a victorious Battle of Lučenac against the Hungarian troops of Ladislaus Hunyadi, who were more than twice as numerous. However, the fighting with the Hungarians continued and, as a result of the lost Battle of Trebišov in November 1454, their activity was paralysed in the Zemplén region. In 1455 they managed to defend Kežmarok in Spiš against the troops of John Jiskra, who was then in Hungarian service, while the growing involvement of cities (especially Levoča and Bardejov) in combating it became an increasing threat to the movement. By 1458, Aksamit's troops already controlled eastern and partly central Slovakia. In the territories governed by the Brothers, there were about 35 field camps and castles, where radical Hussite piety was practiced, and the official language was Czech. In 1458, after the defeat in the Battle of Blatný Potok (Sárospatak), during which many members of the movement were killed and taken prisoner, the formation gradually declined, which ended in 1467 with the capture of the camp at Veľké Kostoľany in western Slovakia by Matthias Corvinus' troops. Many Brothers then went over to the king's side and became members of the elite Matthias Guard (the so-called Black Rota).
