= Hukvaldy =

Municipality in Moravian-Silesian Region, Czech Republic

- Municipality
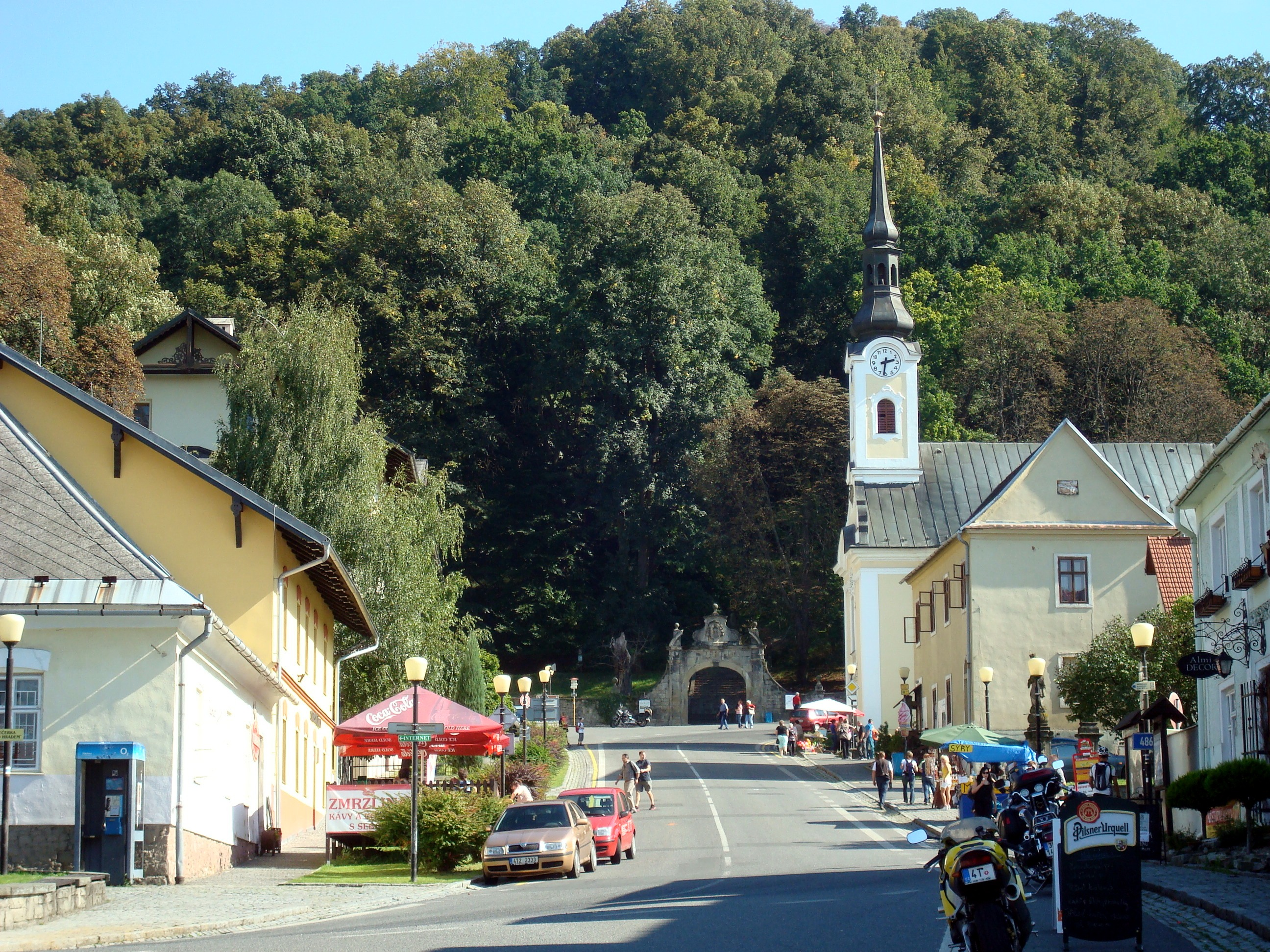
- Centre of Hukvaldy

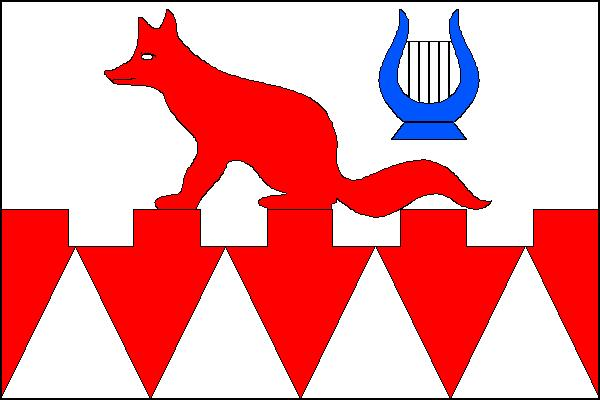
- Flag Coat of arms

- Location in the Czech Republic
- Coordinates: 49°37′26″N 18°13′19″E
- Country: Czech Republic
- Region: Moravian-Silesian
- District: Frýdek-Místek
- First mentioned: 1285

Area
  - Total: 20.31 km^{2} (7.84 sq mi)
- Elevation: 282 m (925 ft)

Population (2026-01-01)
  - Total: 2,198
  - Density: 108.2/km^{2} (280.3/sq mi)
- Time zone: UTC+1 (CET)
  - Summer (DST): UTC+2 (CEST)
- Postal code: 739 46
- Website: www.hukvaldy.eu

Hukvaldy (German: Hochwald) is a municipality and village in Frýdek-Místek District in the Moravian-Silesian Region of the Czech Republic. It has about 2,200 inhabitants. The municipality is known for the ruins of the third-largest castle in the Czech Republic, Hukvaldy Castle, and as the birthplace of the composer Leoš Janáček.

== Administrative division ==
Hukvaldy consists of five municipal parts (in brackets population according to the 2021 census):

- Hukvaldy (542)
- Dolní Sklenov (586)
- Horní Sklenov (205)
- Krnalovice (89)
- Rychaltice (683)

== Etymology ==
The name is derived from the Hückeswagen family, who were the first owners of Hukvaldy.

== Geography ==
Hukvaldy is located about 10 kilometres (6 mi) southwest of Frýdek-Místek and 19 km (12 mi) south of Ostrava. It lies in the Moravian-Silesian Foothills. The highest point is the hill Babí hora at 619 m (2,031 ft) above sea level. The Ondřejnice River flows through the municipality.

== History ==
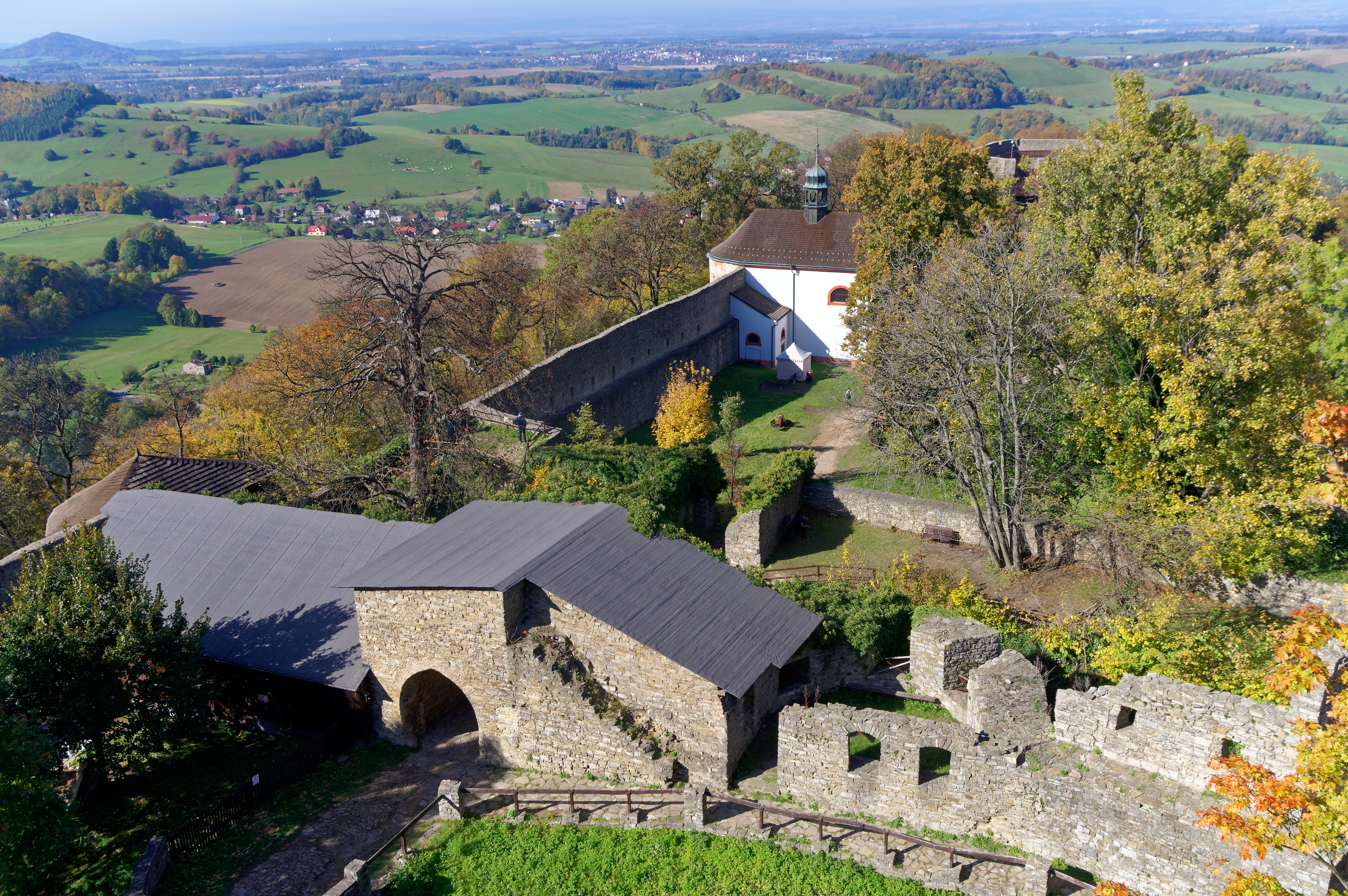
Hukvaldy Castle

The Hukvaldy Castle was founded in the 1270s or 1280s by the Hückeswagen family and was first mentioned in 1285. It was a guard castle on the trade route from Olomouc to Kraków. The settlement of Hukvaldy was soon established nearby. The settlement of Sklenov was established under the castle and was first documented in 1294.

Between 1294 and 1307, the Hukvaldy estate was acquired by the bishops of Olomouc, who often pledged it to various noblemen. In the following centuries, the castle was expanded into a massive fortress. In 1762, the castle was destroyed by a fire. In the following decades, the castle was dismantled as a source of building material. Repairs began in the 1960s.

The municipality was known as Sklenov until 1982. Since 1 July 1982, it has been named Hukvaldy.

== Demographics ==
Historical population

Year	Pop.	±%
1869	1,862	—
1880	1,941	+4.2%
1890	1,837	−5.4%
1900	1,916	+4.3%
1910	1,940	+1.3%

Year	Pop.	±%
1921	1,829	−5.7%
1930	2,107	+15.2%
1950	1,994	−5.4%
1961	2,145	+7.6%
1970	2,070	−3.5%

Year	Pop.	±%
1980	1,995	−3.6%
1991	1,856	−7.0%
2001	1,904	+2.6%
2011	1,910	+0.3%
2021	2,105	+10.2%

Source: Censuses

== Transport ==
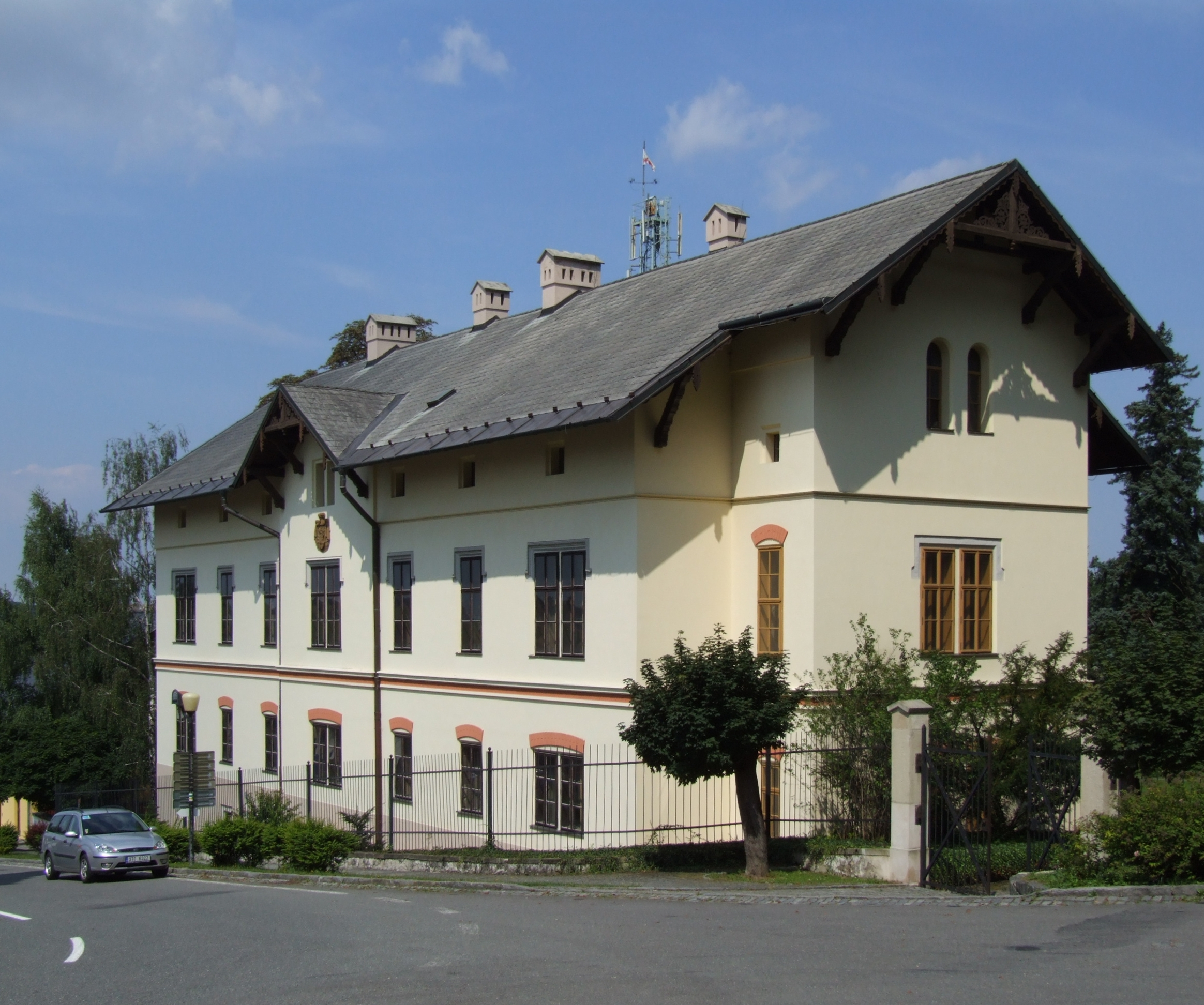
Former archbishops palace

The D48 motorway (part of the European route E462) from Nový Jičín to the Czech–Polish border runs through the northern part of the municipality.

== Culture ==
Until 2017, the music festival called Janáček's Hukvaldy took place in Hukvaldy. Since 2018, it has been a part of the Leoš Janáček International Music Festival in Ostrava. It is one of the most important classical music festivals in the Czech Republic.

== Sights ==
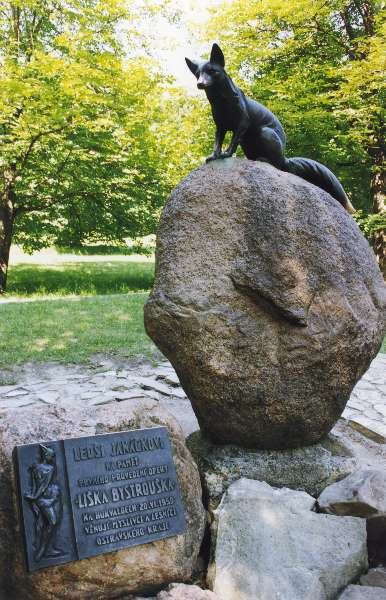
Monument of Bystrouška

Hukvaldy Castle is the third largest castle in the country. It is gradually being reconstructed. There is an exhibition on the history and architectural development of the castle. Accessible are also well-preserved guard rooms and the Baroque Chapel of Saint Andrew used for concerts. Part of the palace was converted into a lookout tower.

The castle is surrounded by a game park, founded in the 16th century. It is home to fallow deers, mouflons and wild boars. In the game park is an amphitheatre and the Monument of Bystrouška from Janáček's opera The Cunning Little Vixen.

== Notable people ==
- Jan Čapek of Sány (c. 1390 – c. 1452), nobleman and military officer; owned the castle and probably died here
- Friedrich Egon von Fürstenberg (1813–1892), archbishop of Olomouc; died here
- Leoš Janáček (1854–1928), composer

== Gallery ==
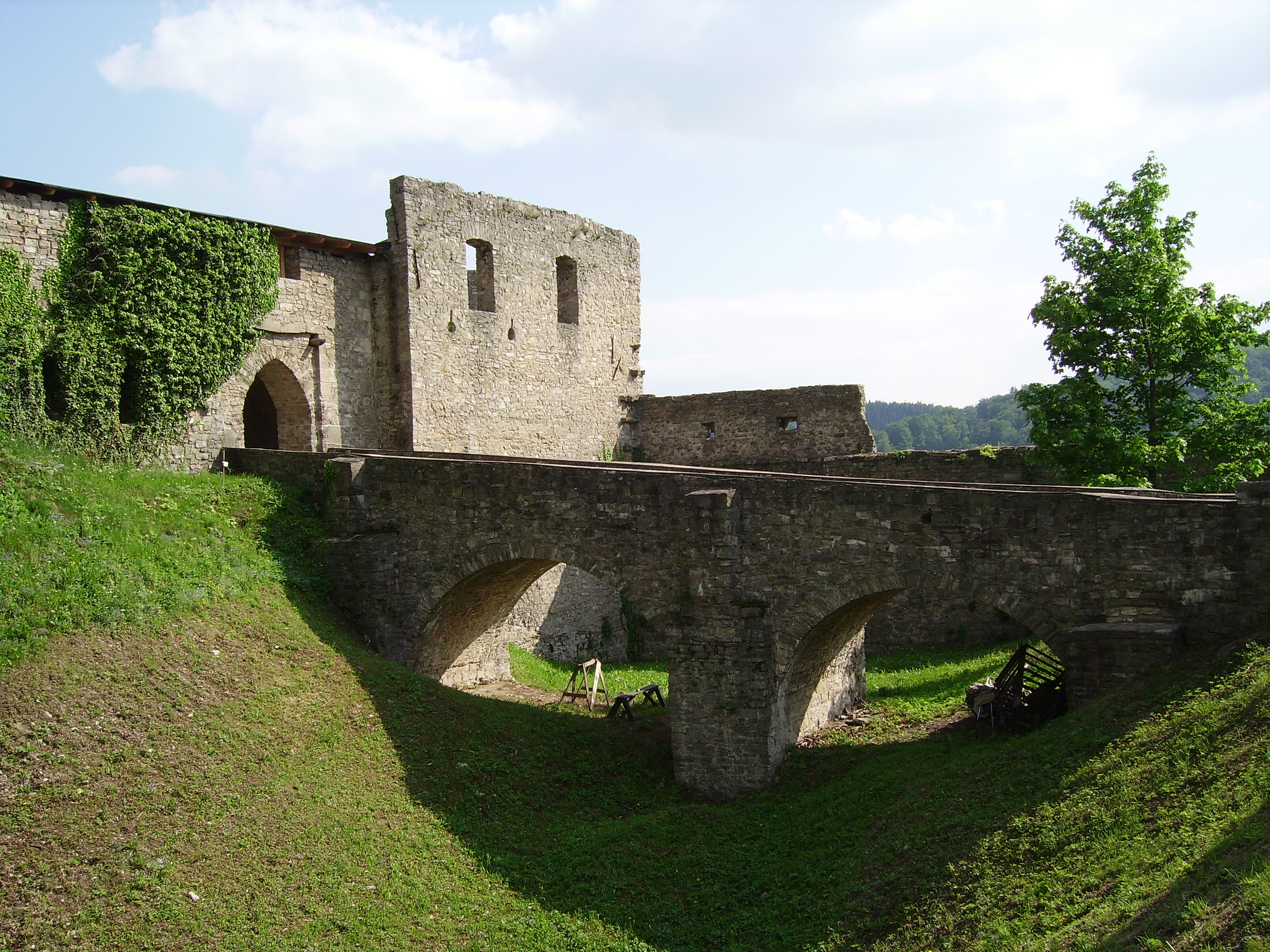
A bridge in Hukvaldy Castle

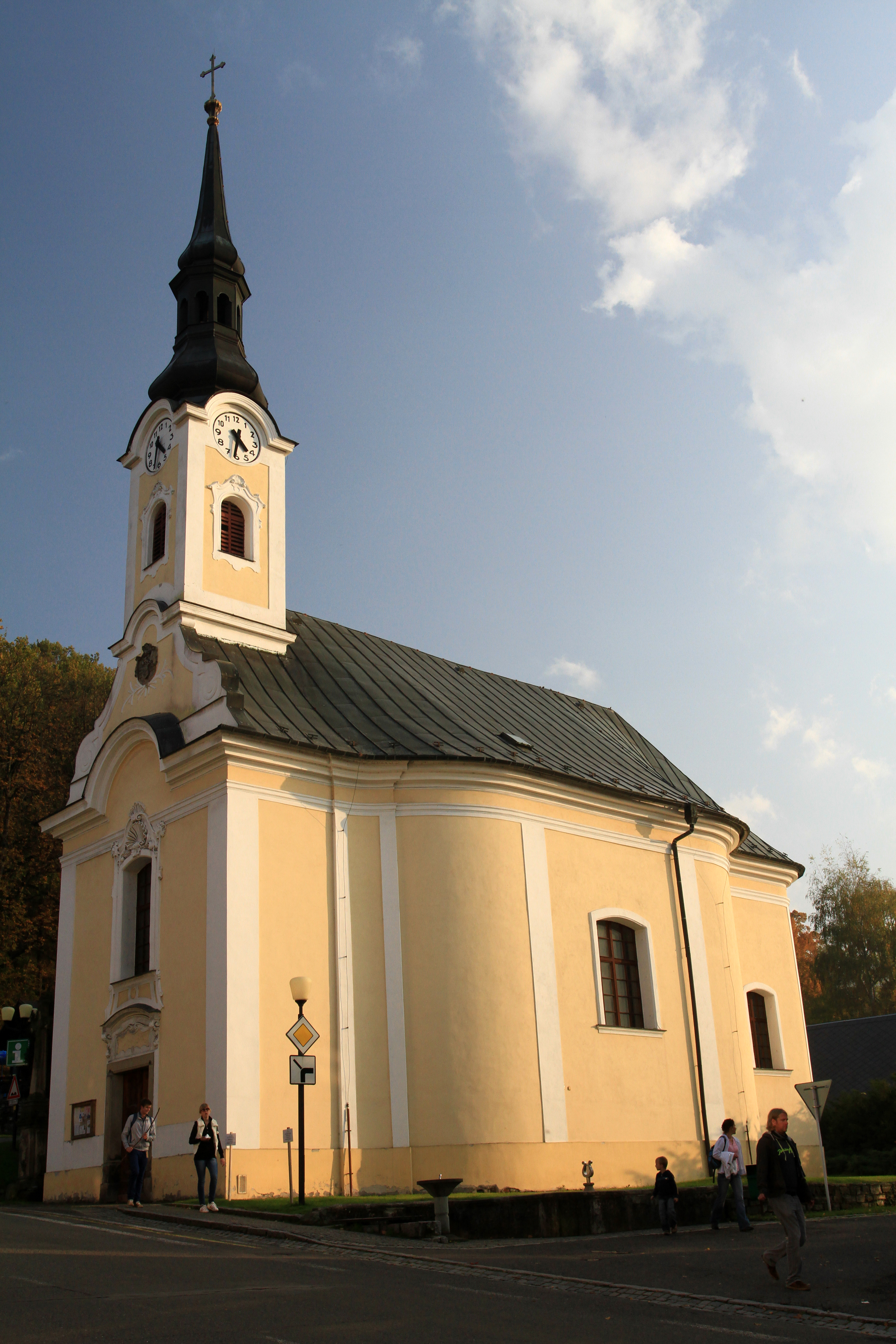
Church of Saint Maximilian
