= Hartvíkovice =

- Municipality
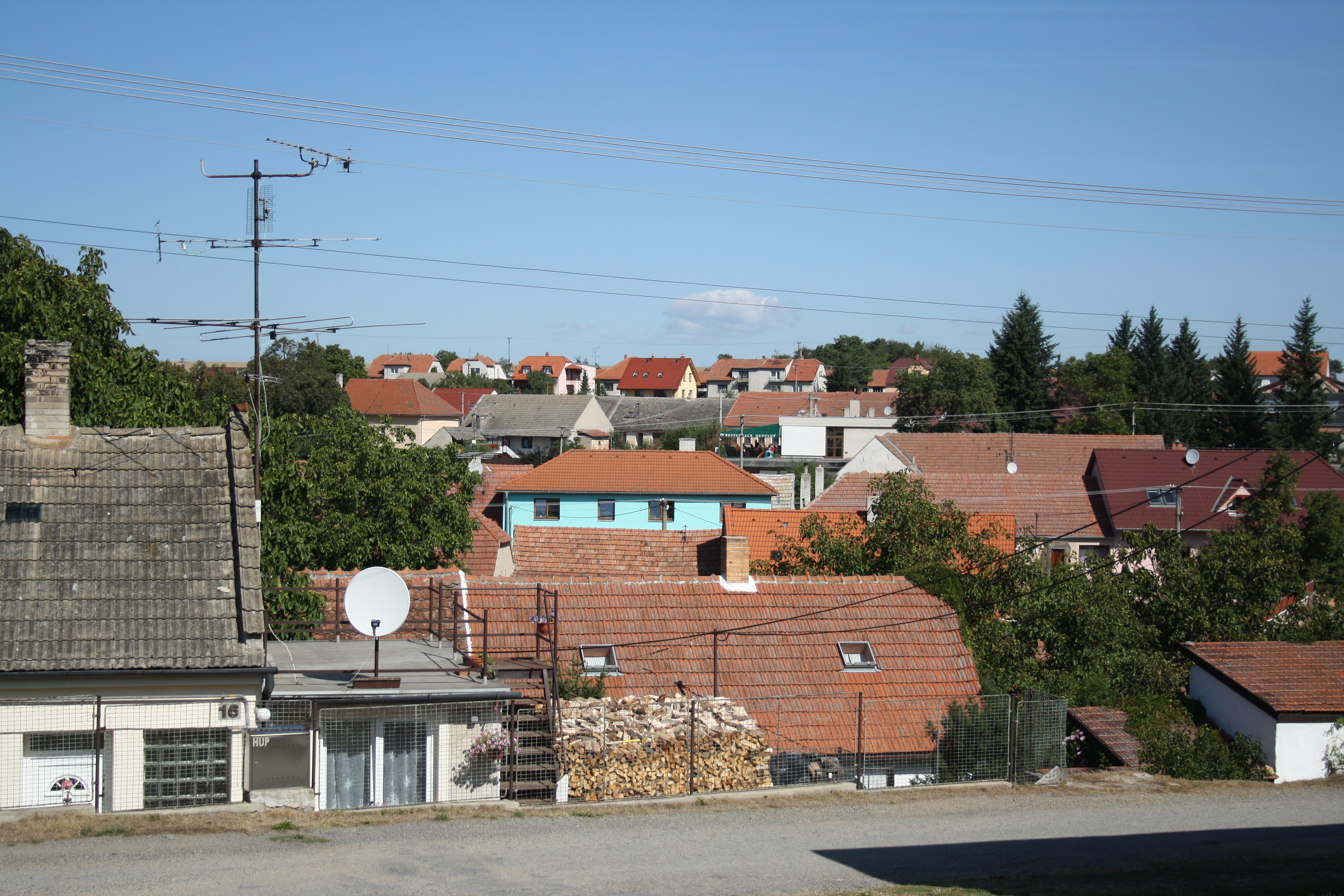
- Centre of Hartvíkovice

- Flag Coat of arms

- Location in the Czech Republic
- Coordinates: 49°10′16″N 16°5′25″E
- Country: Czech Republic
- Region: Vysočina
- District: Třebíč
- First mentioned: 1104

Area
  - Total: 5.74 km^{2} (2.22 sq mi)
- Elevation: 440 m (1,440 ft)

Population (2026-01-01)
  - Total: 571
  - Density: 99.5/km^{2} (258/sq mi)
- Time zone: UTC+1 (CET)
  - Summer (DST): UTC+2 (CEST)
- Postal code: 675 76
- Website: www.hartvikovice.cz

Hartvíkovice is a municipality and village in Třebíč District in the Vysočina Region of the Czech Republic. It has about 600 inhabitants.

Hartvíkovice lies approximately 16 kilometres (10 mi) east of Třebíč, 44 km (27 mi) south-east of Jihlava, and 158 km (98 mi) south-east of Prague.

== Demographics ==
Historical population
Year	Pop.	±%
1869	386	—
1880	437	+13.2%
1890	560	+28.1%
1900	584	+4.3%
1910	547	−6.3%
1921	577	+5.5%
1930	633	+9.7%
1950	581	−8.2%
1961	695	+19.6%
1970	681	−2.0%
1980	635	−6.8%
1991	576	−9.3%
2001	565	−1.9%
2011	547	−3.2%
2021	533	−2.6%
Source: Censuses
