= Haligovce =

Village and municipality in Slovakia

- Municipality
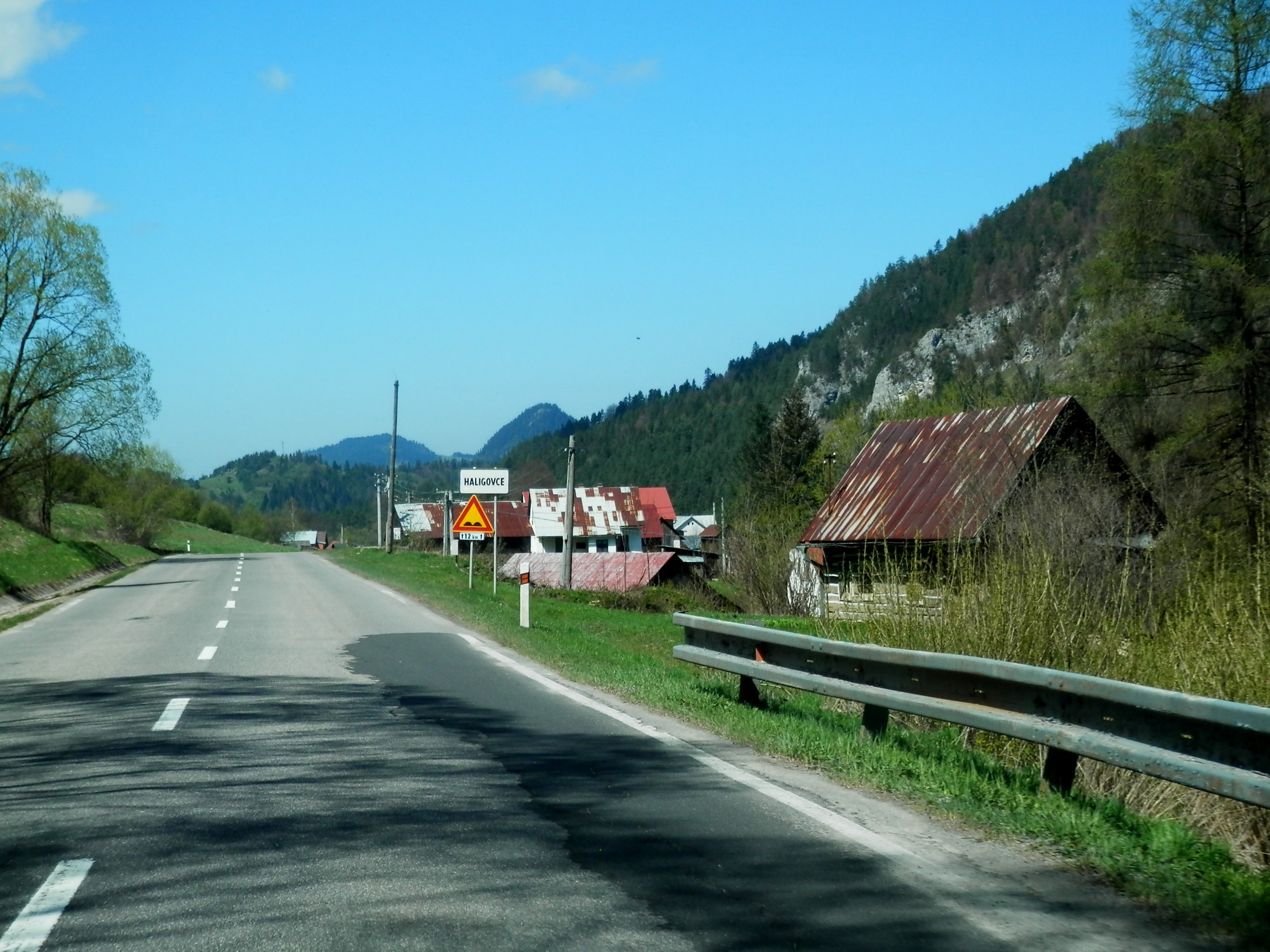

- Flag

- Location of Haligovce in the Prešov Region Location of Haligovce in Slovakia
- Coordinates: 49.37°N 20.45°E
- Country: Slovakia
- Region: Prešov Region
- District: Stará Ľubovňa District
- First mentioned: 1338

Area
  - Total: 11.28 km^{2} (4.36 sq mi)
- Elevation: 506 m (1,660 ft)

Population (2025)
  - Total: 655
- Time zone: UTC+1 (CET)
  - Summer (DST): UTC+2 (CEST)
- Postal code: 653 4
- Area code: +421 52
- Vehicle registration plate (until 2022): SL
- Website: obechaligovce.sk

Haligovce (Hungarian: Helivágása, Rusyn: Галіґівцї) is a village and municipality in Stará Ľubovňa District in the Prešov Region of northern Slovakia. Former name of the village was "Hedvigina Poruba".

== History ==
In historical records the village was first mentioned in 1338. Before the establishment of independent Czechoslovakia in 1918, Haligovce was part of Szepes County within the Kingdom of Hungary. From 1939 to 1945, it was part of the Slovak Republic. On 25 January 1945, the Red Army dislodged the Wehrmacht from Haligovce and it was once again part of Czechoslovakia.

== Geography ==
The municipality lies at an altitude of 506 metres (1,660 ft) and covers an area of 11.28 km^{2} (4.36 sq mi) (2025).

== Population ==
Population statistic (10 years)
Year	1995	2005	2015	2025
Count	655	680	639	655
Difference		+3.81%	−6.02%	+2.50%

Population statistic
Year	2024	2025
Count	653	655
Difference		+0.30%

It has a population of 655 people (31 December 2025).

=== Ethnicity ===
Census 2021 (1+ %)
Ethnicity	Number	Fraction
Slovak	636	97.84%
Not found out	164	25.23%
Total	650	

In year 2021 was 650 people by ethnicity 636 as Slovak, 164 as Not found out, 4 as Romani, 3 as Turkish, 3 as Rusyn, 1 as Italian, 1 as Polish, 1 as German and 1 as Other.

Note on population: The difference values of population numbers in the table "Population statistic" and in the sections "Ethnicity" & "Religion" is caused by the use of various statistical methods.

=== Religion ===
Census 2021 (1+ %)
Religion	Number	Fraction
Roman Catholic Church	603	92.77%
Greek Catholic Church	21	3.23%
Not found out	11	1.69%
None	7	1.08%
Total	650	

In year 2021 was 650 people by religion 603 from Roman Catholic Church, 21 from Greek Catholic Church, 11 from Not found out, 7 from None, 2 from Other, 2 from Evangelical Church, 1 from Paganism and natural spirituality, 1 from Other and not ascertained christian church, 1 from Jehovah's Witnesses and 1 from Ad hoc movements.

== Genealogical resources ==
The records for genealogical research are available at the state archive "Statny Archiv in Levoca, Slovakia"

- Roman Catholic church records (births/marriages/deaths): 1750-1895(parish A)

== See also ==
- List of municipalities and towns in Slovakia
