= Paulhan, Hérault =

Paulhan
- Commune
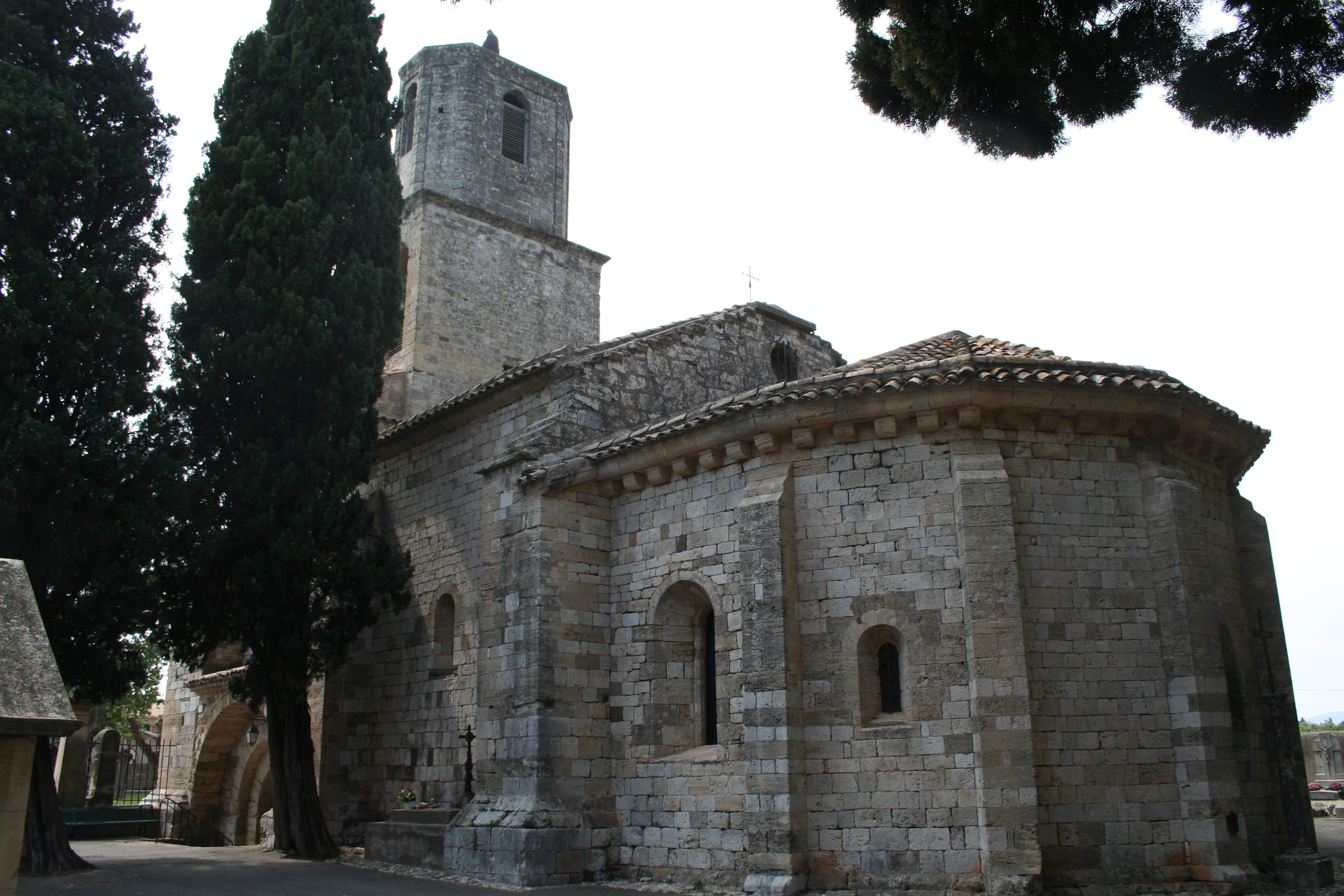
- The church of Notre-Dame des Vertus

- Coat of arms
- Location of Paulhan
- Location within France Location within Occitanie
- Coordinates: 43°32′30″N 3°27′35″E
- Country: France
- Region: Occitania
- Department: Hérault
- Arrondissement: Lodève
- Canton: Clermont-l'Hérault
- Intercommunality: Clermontais

Government
  - Mayor (2020–2026): Claude Valéro
- Area^{1}: 11.26 km^{2} (4.35 sq mi)
- Elevation: 35 m (115 ft)
- Highest elevation: 83 m (272 ft)
- Lowest elevation: 18 m (59 ft)
- Population (2023): 4,039
  - Density: 358.7/km^{2} (929.0/sq mi)
- Time zone: UTC+01:00 (CET)
  - Summer (DST): UTC+02:00 (CEST)
- INSEE/Postal code: 34194 /34230
- ^{1} French Land Register data, which excludes lakes, ponds, glaciers > 1 km^{2} (0.386 sq mi or 247 acres) and river estuaries.

Paulhan (French pronunciation: [polɑ̃], [pojɑ̃]; Occitan pronunciation: [pawˈʎan]) is a commune in Hérault, Occitania, Southern France.

Its inhabitants are called Paulhanais (male) or Paulhanaises (female).

== Population ==
Historical population
Year	Pop.	±% p.a.
1968	2,421	—
1975	2,276	−0.88%
1982	2,379	+0.63%
1990	2,580	+1.02%
1999	2,634	+0.23%
2007	3,316	+2.92%
2012	3,769	+2.59%
2017	3,937	+0.88%
2023	4,039	+0.43%
Source: INSEE

== Twin towns ==
- Krailling, Germany
- Brezová pod Bradlom, Slovakia
- Košariská, Slovakia

== See also ==
- Communes of the Hérault department
