= Tomb of Milan Rastislav Štefánik =

Slovak historic site

Coordinates: 48°40′46″N 17°33′49″E

Tomb of Milan Rastislav Stefanik
- Mohyla Milana Rastislava Štefánika
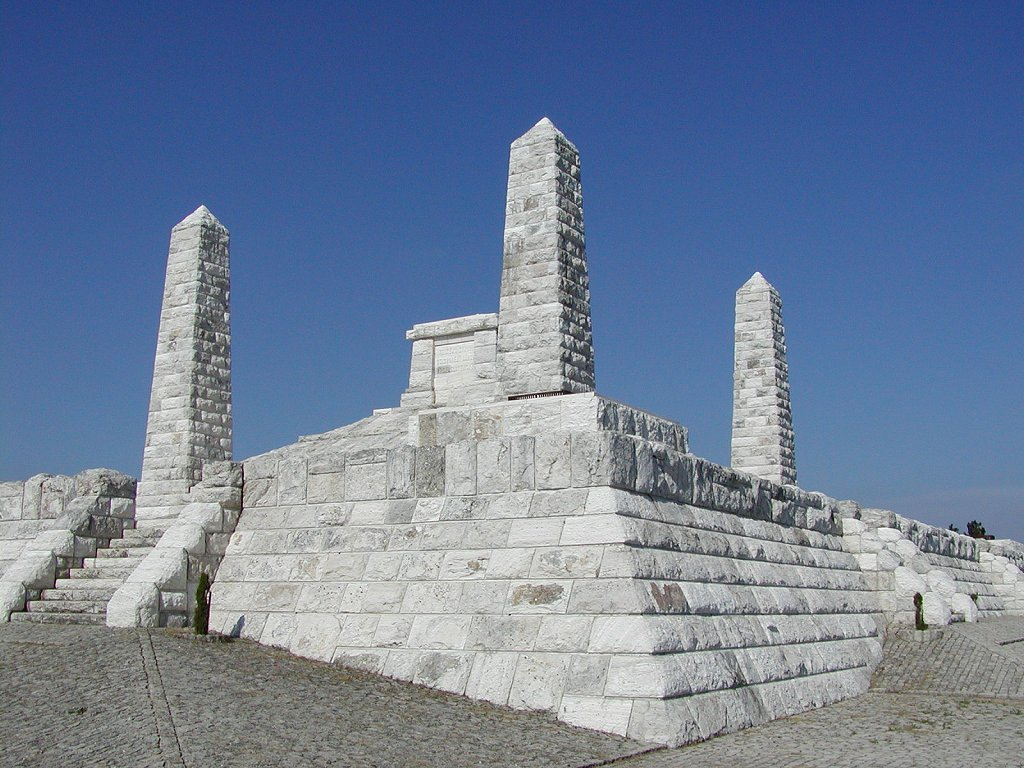
- The tomb in 2003
- Interactive map of the Tomb of Milan Rastislav Stefanik area
- Former names: Štefánikova mohyla

General information
- Type: Travertine
- Location: Brezová pod Bradlom, Slovakia
- Construction started: 1924
- Completed: 1928
- Opened: September 20, 1928
- Owner: Cultural Heritage Monuments of Slovakia

Height
- Height: 543m (including hill which it is built on)

Design and construction
- Architect: Dušan Jurkovič

The Tomb of Milan Rastislav Stefanik (Slovak: Mohyla Milana Rastislava Štefánika) is the Tomb of Slovak politician, diplomat, aviator and astronomer Milan Rastislav Štefánik.

The mound is one of the most famous architectural works by Dušan Jurkovič.

The mound is a 96 metres (315 ft) long and 70 metres (230 ft) wide structure. Its lower terrace, which has dimensions of 93 by 62 metres (305 ft × 203 ft) and two staircases, is terminated in the corners by fire chambers. On the upper terrace, which has dimensions of 45 by 32 metres (148 ft × 105 ft) and also two staircases, there are four 12.5 metres (41 ft) m high obelisks. The obelisks symbolize the four victims of the plane crash and at the same time the four countries in which Štefánik worked.

== History ==
General M. R. Štefánik died on May 4, 1919, while returning to his homeland near Ivanka pri Dunaji. Three days later (May 7), he was buried together with his Italian garrison above his native Košariske on Bradlo.

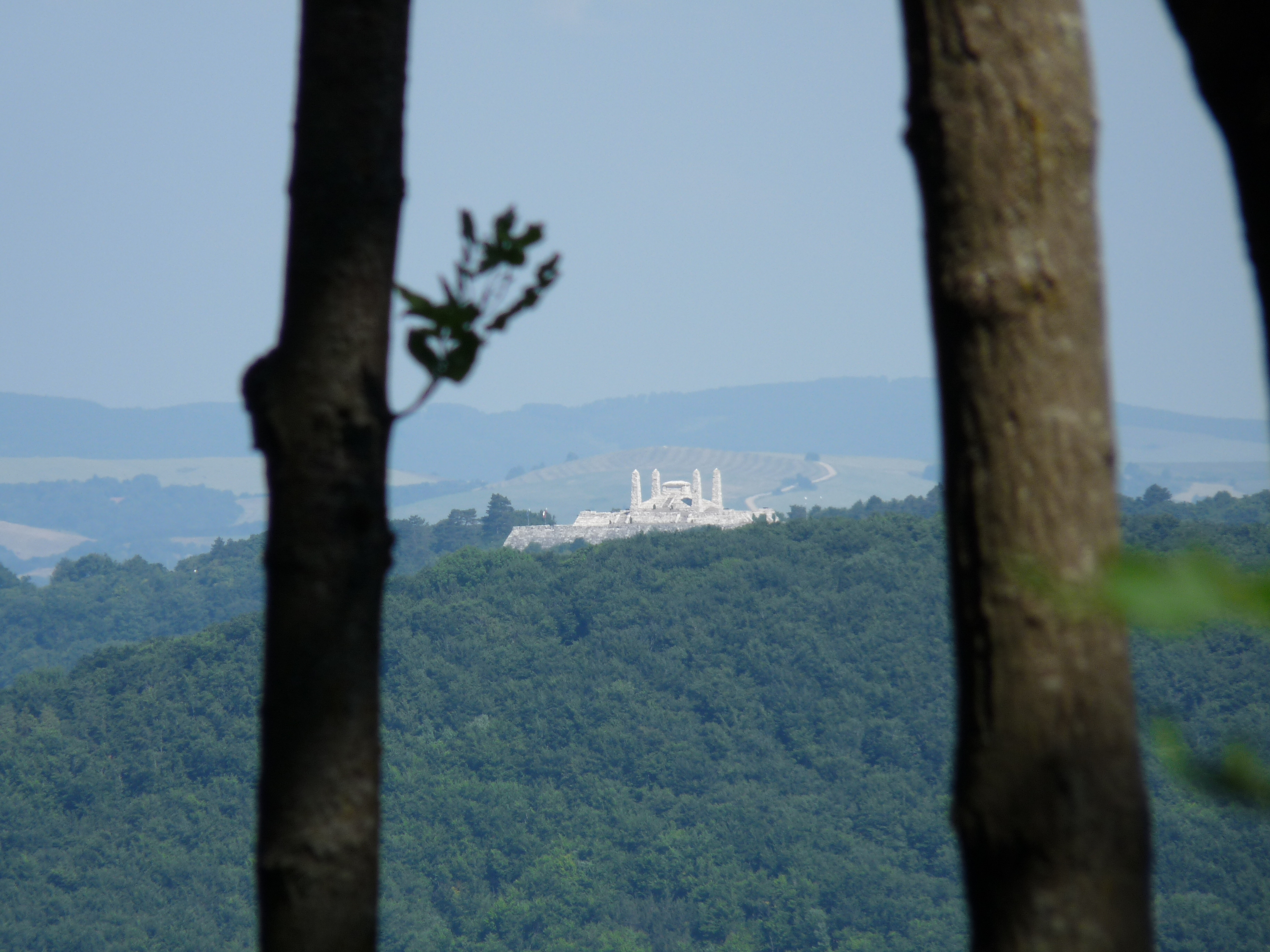
View of the tomb from afar.

Five years after Štefánik's death, the foundation stone of the monument was laid. Preparatory work for the construction of the monument made of travertine, originating from the quarry in Spišské Vlachy, began on July 17, 1927. 150 to 200 workers worked continuously on the mound for 280 days. The construction was completed on September 20, 1928. The construction costs amounted to almost three million Czechoslovak crowns. The amount did not include the cost of the travertine, as it was a gift from the state. The ceremonial unveiling of the completed mound took place on September 23, 1928, with the participation of high-ranking state officials and members of the diplomatic corps. It was declared a national cultural monument in 1968. In 2009, it was added on to the European Heritage List.
