= Becherov =

- Municipality
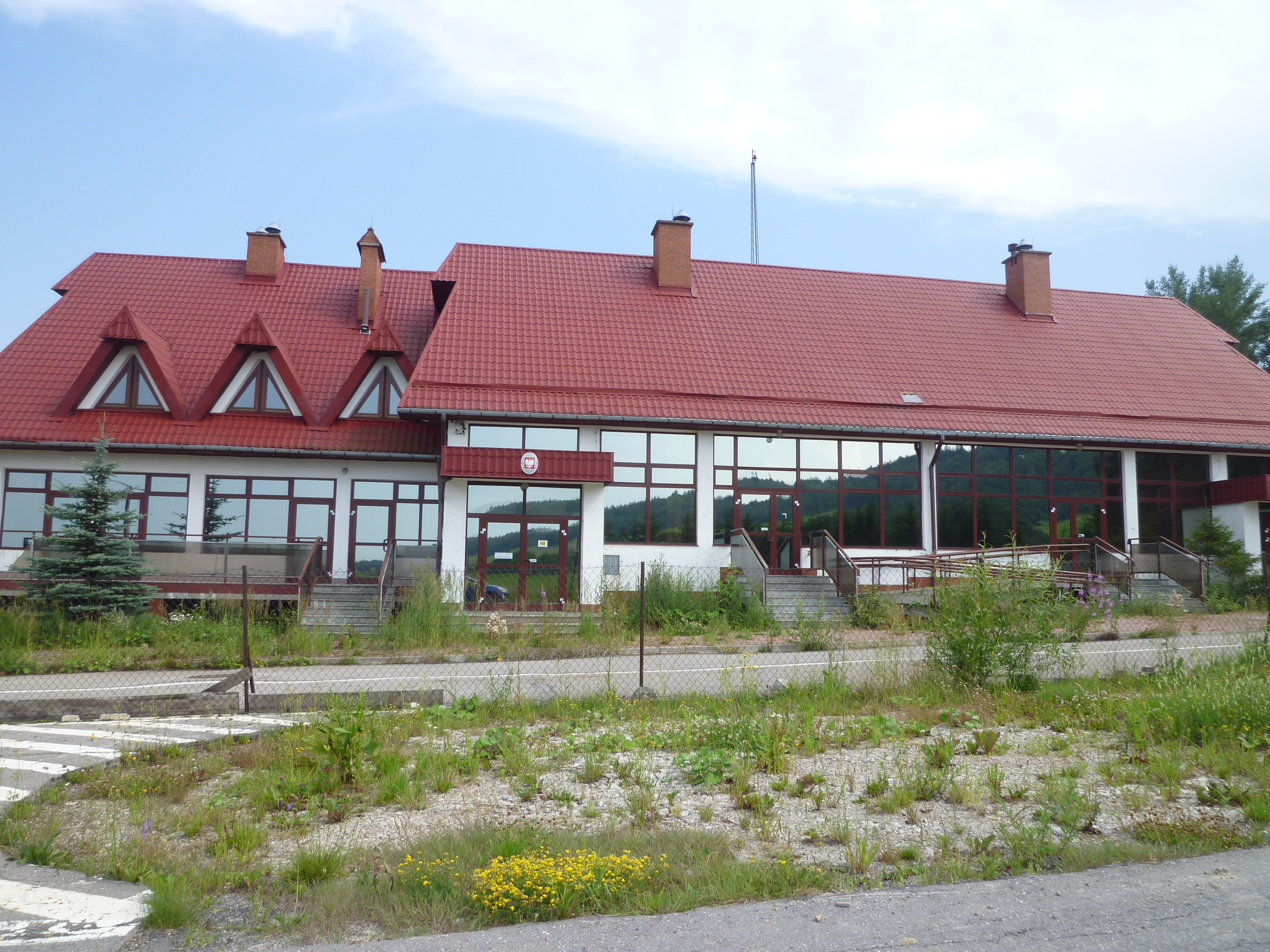

- Flag

- Location of Becherov in the Prešov Region Location of Becherov in Slovakia
- Coordinates: 49.42°N 21.32°E
- Country: Slovakia
- Region: Prešov Region
- District: Bardejov District
- First mentioned: 1414

Government
  - Mayor: Štefan Fedorko

Area
  - Total: 19.09 km^{2} (7.37 sq mi)
- Elevation: 426 m (1,398 ft)

Population (2025)
  - Total: 281
- Time zone: UTC+1 (CET)
  - Summer (DST): UTC+2 (CEST)
- Postal code: 863 5
- Area code: +421 54
- Vehicle registration plate (until 2022): BJ
- Website: www.obecbecherov.sk

Becherov (Rusyn: Бехерів, romanized: Bekheriv, Hungarian: Biharó) is a municipality (village) in Slovakia in the Bardejov Districtin the Prešov Region near the border with Poland.

== History ==
Before the establishment of independent Czechoslovakia in 1918, Becherov was part of Sáros County within the Kingdom of Hungary. From 1939 to 1945, it was part of the Slovak Republic. On 19 January 1945, the Red Army dislodged the Wehrmacht from Becherov and it was once again part of Czechoslovakia.

The village features:

- the Greek Catholic church of Virgin Mary built in 1847
- an Orthodox church with features of Old Russian Baroque
- the Natural Nature Reserve Becherovská tisina – Becherov yew forest (declared in 1954, area 24.13 ha, features: rare fauna and flora, a sulphatic water spring
- World War I memorial and cemetery built in 1933 which was projected by Dušan Jurkovič
- World War II memorial
- a border crossing point to Poland (opened in 1994)
- an annual folklore festival called Stretnutie pri vatre Bonfire meeting

== Geography ==
The municipality lies at an altitude of 426 metres (1,398 ft) and covers an area of 19.09 km^{2} (7.37 sq mi) (2025).

== Population ==
Population statistic (10 years)
Year	1995	2005	2015	2025
Count	289	277	279	281
Difference		−4.15%	+0.72%	+0.71%

Population statistic
Year	2024	2025
Count	275	281
Difference		+2.18%

It has a population of 281 people (31 December 2025).

=== Ethnicity ===
Census 2021 (1+ %)
Ethnicity	Number	Fraction
Slovak	169	60.35%
Rusyn	139	49.64%
Ukrainian	13	4.64%
Romani	13	4.64%
Not found out	6	2.14%
Total	280	

In year 2021 was 280 people by ethnicity 169 as Slovak, 139 as Rusyn, 13 as Ukrainian, 13 as Romani, 6 as Not found out and 2 as Polish.

Note on population: The difference values of population numbers in the table "Population statistic" and in the sections "Ethnicity" & "Religion" is caused by the use of various statistical methods.

=== Religion ===
Census 2021 (1+ %)
Religion	Number	Fraction
Greek Catholic Church	109	38.93%
Eastern Orthodox Church	101	36.07%
Roman Catholic Church	43	15.36%
None	16	5.71%
Not found out	6	2.14%
Evangelical Church	4	1.43%
Total	280	

In year 2021 was 280 people by religion 109 from Greek Catholic Church, 101 from Eastern Orthodox Church, 43 from Roman Catholic Church, 16 from None, 6 from Not found out, 4 from Evangelical Church and 1 from Other and not ascertained christian church.

== See also ==
- List of municipalities and towns in Slovakia
