= Slovak Government Flying Service =

Governmental airline of Slovakia based at Bratislava Airport

Slovak Government Flight Service
IATA	ICAO	Call sign
-	SSG	SLOVAK GOVERNMENT
- Founded: 1993
- Hubs: Bratislava Airport
- Fleet size: 5
- Headquarters: Bratislava, Slovakia
- Website: minv.sk

Slovak Government Flight Service is the governmental airline of Slovakia headquartered in Bratislava and based at Bratislava Airport.

== Fleet ==
=== Current fleet ===
The Slovak Government Flight Service fleet includes the following aircraft in 2025:

- 2 Airbus A319 (OM-BYA, in new colors (YOM:2005, with SSG since 2016)), OM-BYK, in new colors (YOM:2002, with SSG since 2017))
- 1 Fokker 100 (OM-BYB, in new colors (YOM:1992, with SSG since 2017)) (as of August 2025)
- 1 Bell 429 (OM-BYD, in black livery (YOM:2014, with SSG since 2015))
- 1 Agusta-Westland AW-189 (OM-BYW, in green livery (Entered service in Feb. 2025))
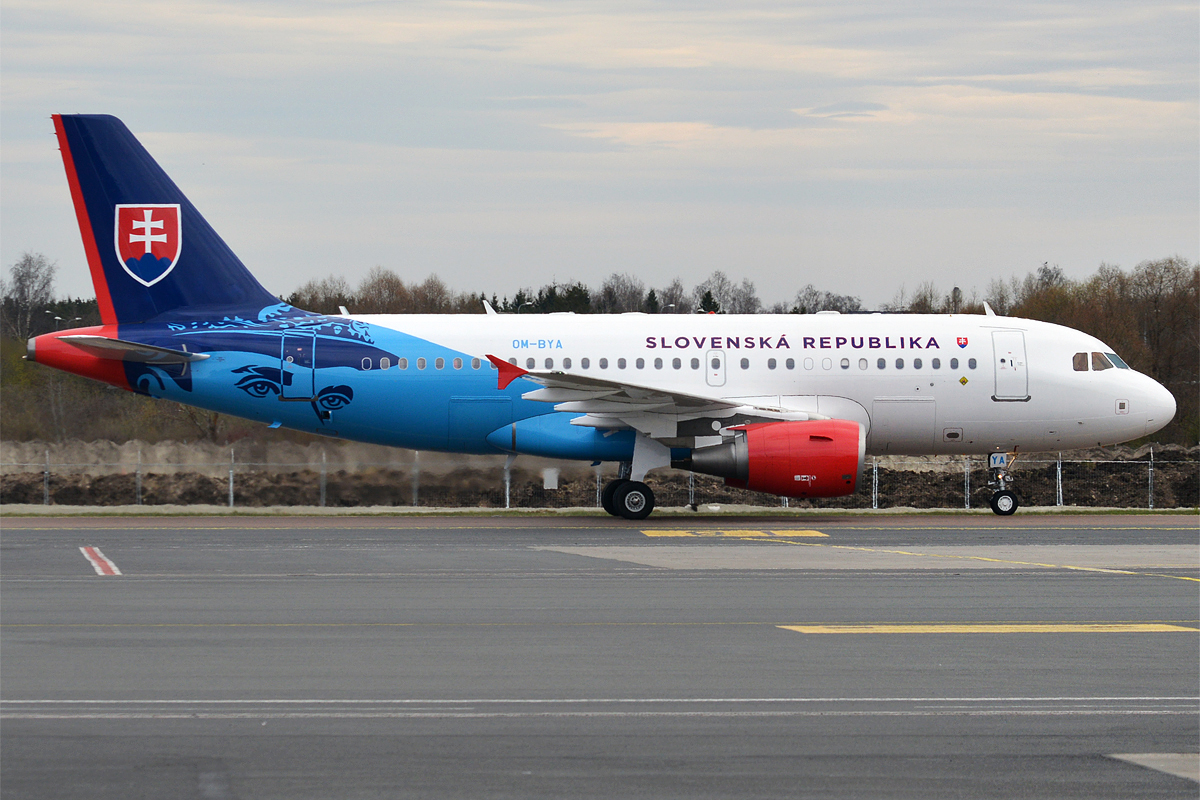
Slovak Airbus ACJ319 portraying famous Slovak politician Milan Rastislav Štefánik

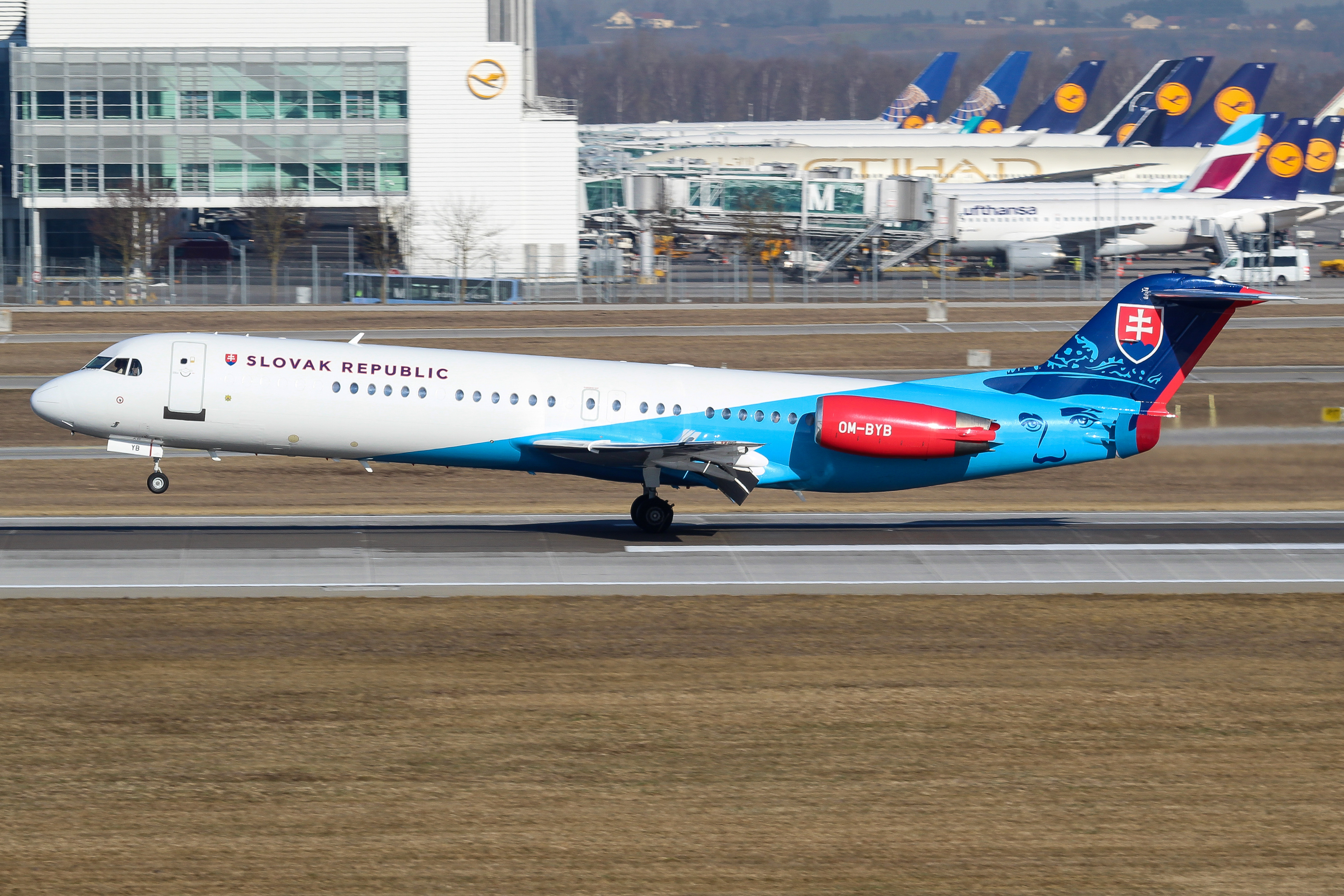
Fokker 100 of Slovak Government Flight Service

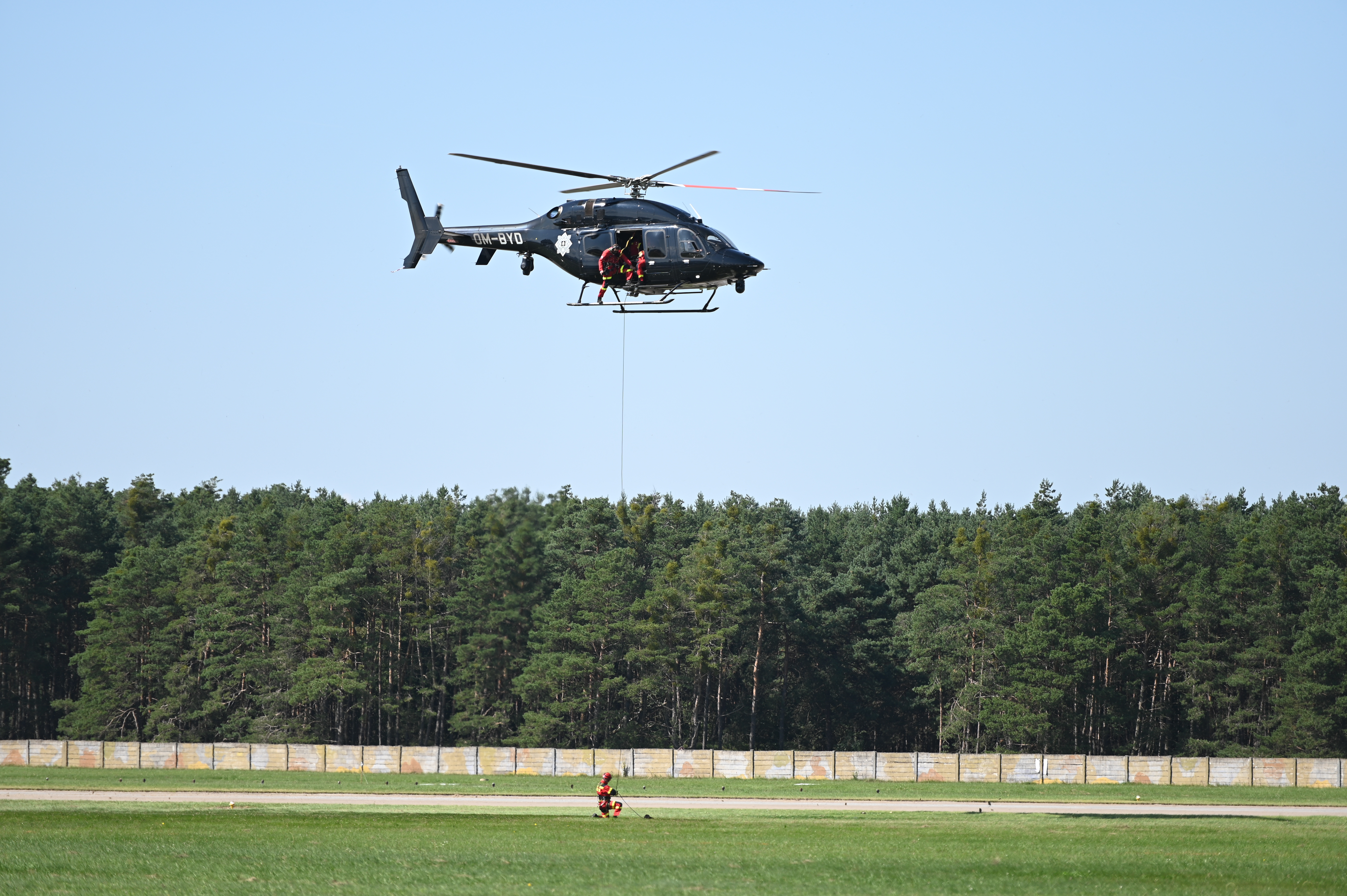
Bell 429 in black livery

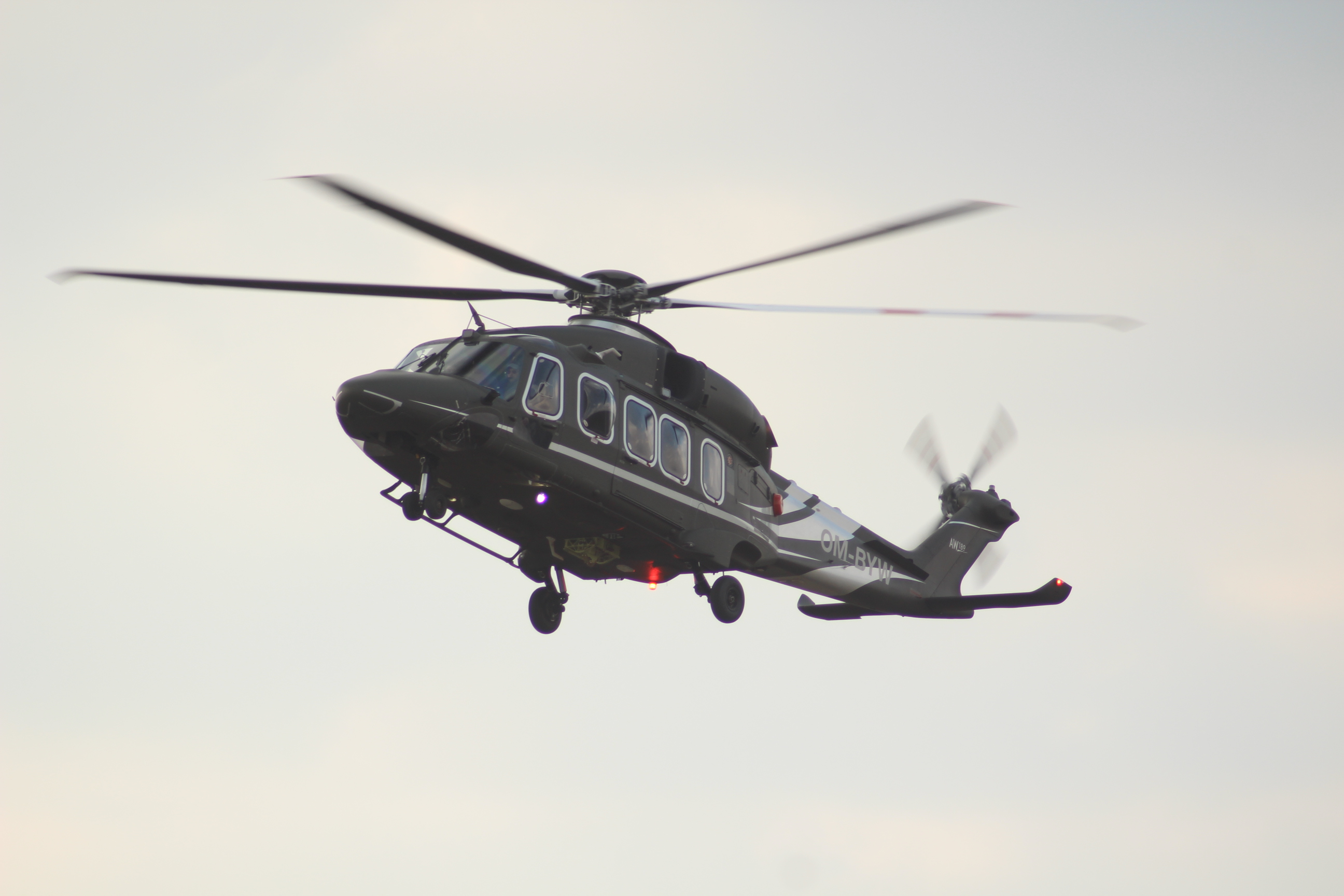
New Agusta-Westland AW-189 of Slovak Government Flight Service

=== Former fleet ===
Since July 2016 one Tupolev Tu-154M (OM-BYO) was replaced with Airbus A319-115 ACJ (OM-BYA) and two Yakovlev Yak-40 (OM-BYE, OM-BYL) with two Fokker 100 aircraft, acquired from MJET. Yak-40 (OM-BYE) and Tupolev Tu-154M (OM-BYO) were ferried to Košice where they are used as an exhibit in the national aviation museum. In September 2024, the era of Mil Mi-171 helicopters in service with the Slovak Government Flying Service came to an end. Other retired aircraft include Mil Mi-2 and Mil Mi-8 helicopters. In February 2025, one Fokker 100 (OM-BYC) was withdrawn from use after a farewell flight over the Slovakia.

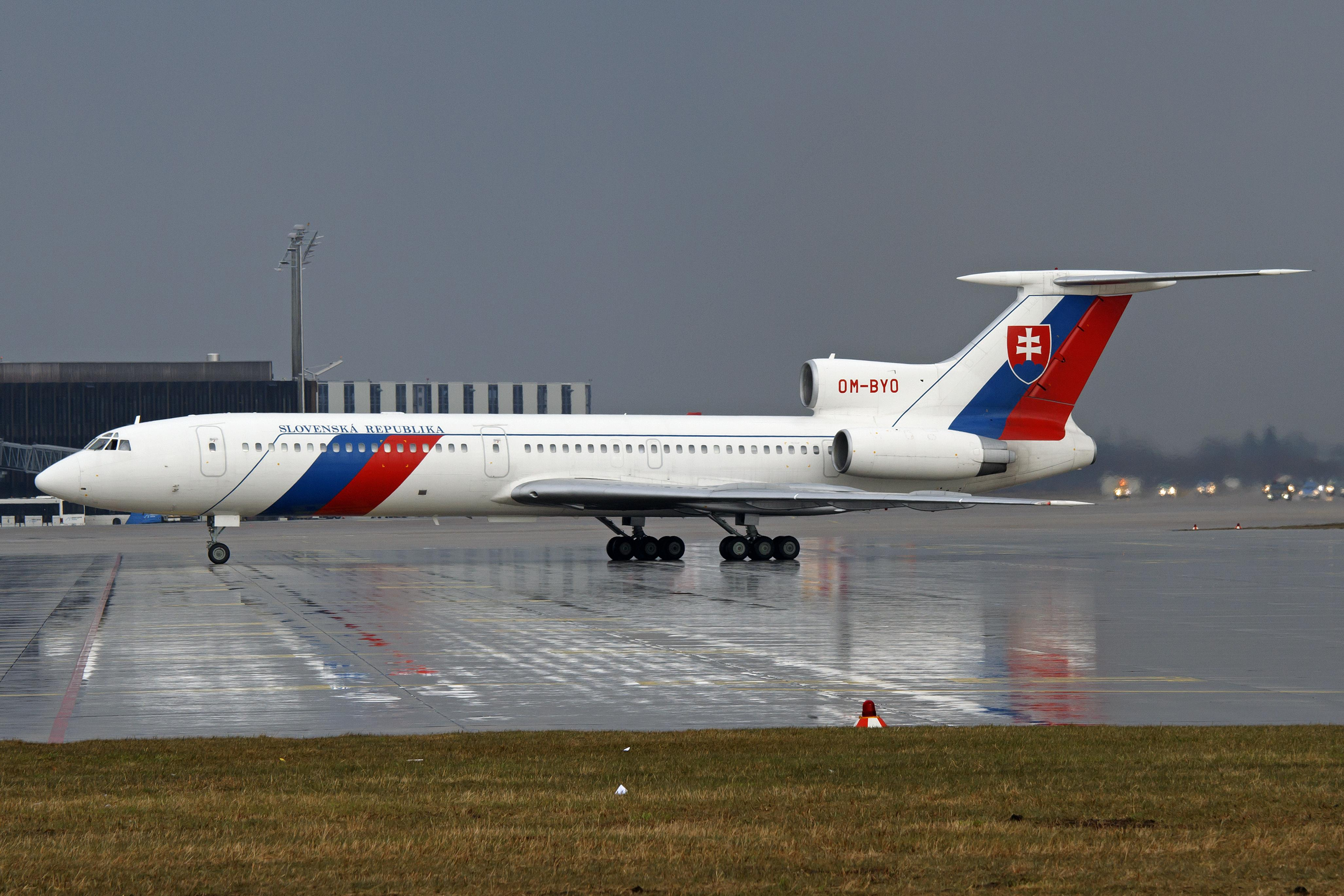
Former Tupolev Tu-154M in old livery

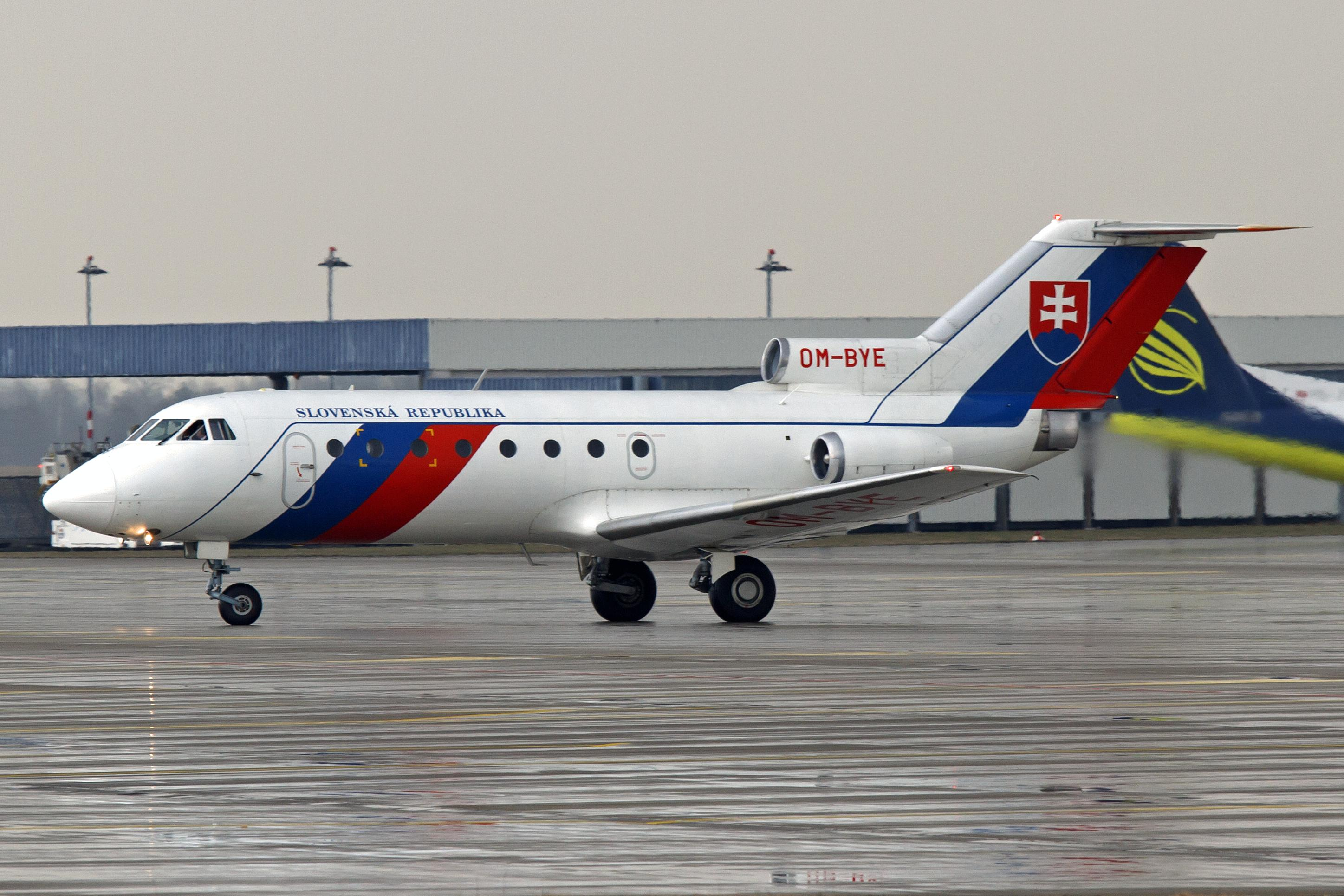
Former Yakovlev Yak-40 in old livery

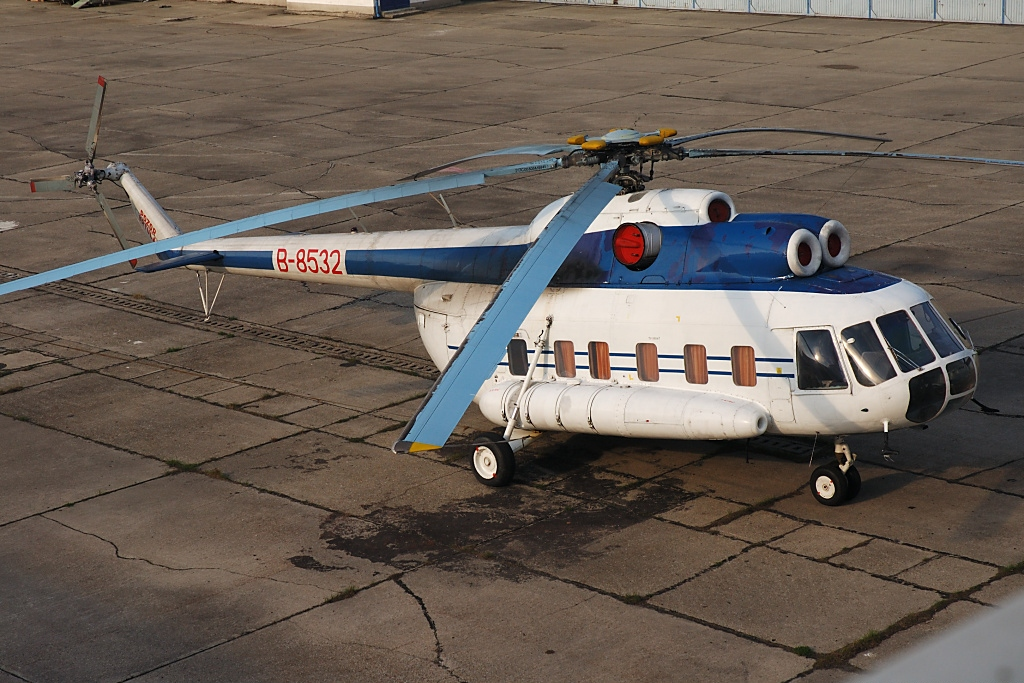
Former Mil Mi-8 in old livery

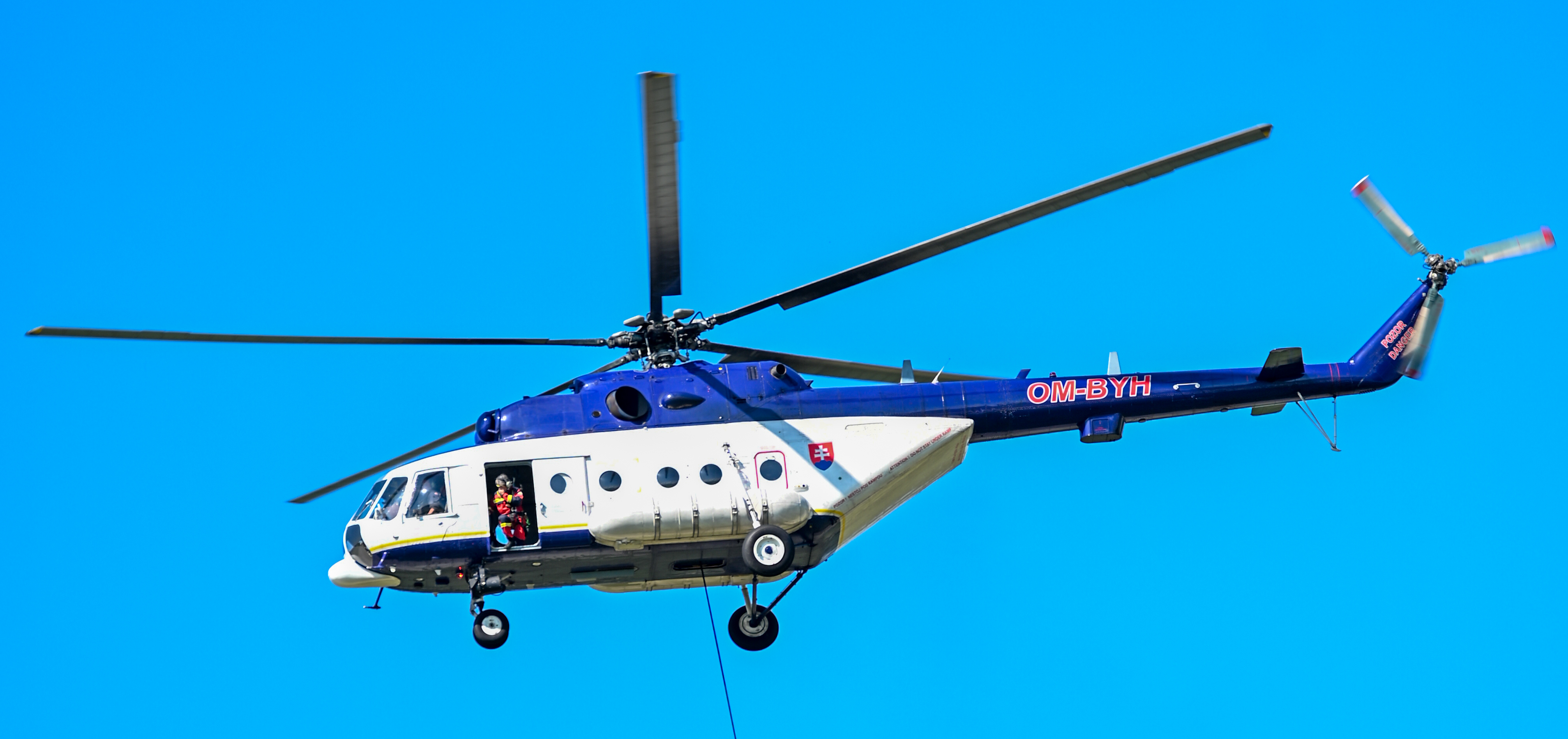
Former Mil Mi-171 in old livery
