= Brezová pod Bradlom =

- Municipality
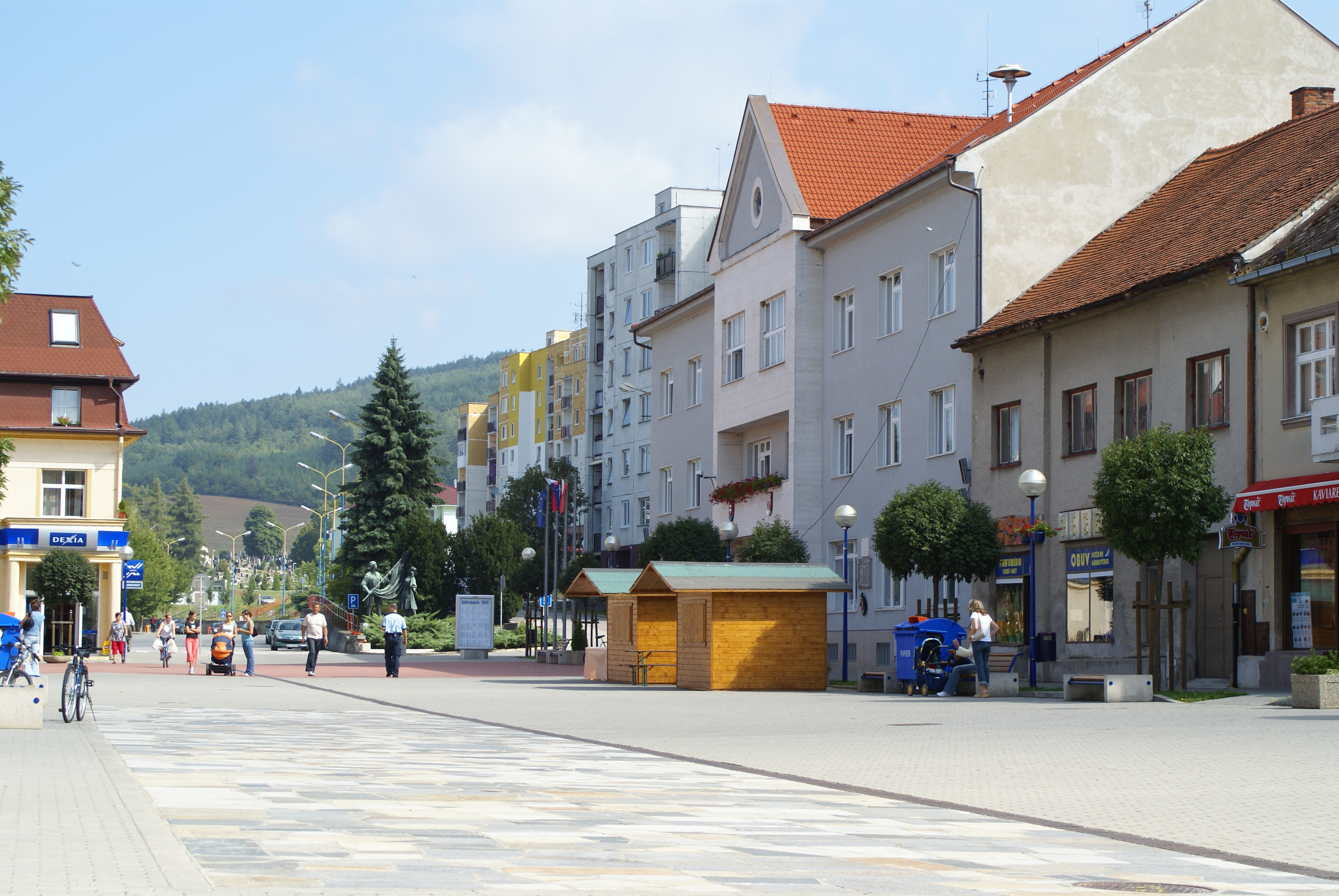

- Flag Coat of arms

- Location of Brezová pod Bradlom in the Trenčín Region Location of Brezová pod Bradlom in Slovakia
- Coordinates: 48.66°N 17.54°E
- Country: Slovakia
- Region: Trenčín Region
- District: Myjava District
- First mentioned: 1262

Government
  - Mayor: Jaroslav Ciran

Area
  - Total: 41.07 km^{2} (15.86 sq mi)
- Elevation: 265 m (869 ft)

Population (2025)
  - Total: 4,496
- Time zone: UTC+1 (CET)
  - Summer (DST): UTC+2 (CEST)
- Postal code: 906 13
- Area code: +421 34
- Vehicle registration plate (until 2022): MY
- Website: www.brezova.sk

Brezová pod Bradlom (German: Birkenhain; Hungarian: Berezó) is a town in the Myjava District, Trenčín Region, western Slovakia, at the western foothills of the Little Carpathians, in the Myjavské Kopanice region.

== Geography ==
The municipality lies at an altitude of 265 metres (869 ft) and covers an area of 41.07 km^{2} (15.86 sq mi) (2025).

== History ==
The territory of Brezová pod Bradlom appears for the first time in written records in 1262. The village was permanently settled in the 15th century or in the first half of 16th century. It was granted the town status in 1709, confirmed in 1966. Before the establishment of independent Czechoslovakia in 1918, it was part of Nyitra County within the Kingdom of Hungary. From 1939 to 1945, it was part of the Slovak Republic. On 7 April 1945, the Red Army dislodged the Wehrmacht from Brezová pod Bradlom and it was once again part of Czechoslovakia.

== Population ==
Population statistic (10 years)
Year	1995	2005	2015	2025
Count	5691	5447	4964	4496
Difference		−4.28%	−8.86%	−9.42%

Population statistic
Year	2024	2025
Count	4543	4496
Difference		−1.03%

It has a population of 4496 people (31 December 2025).

=== Ethnicity ===
Census 2021 (1+ %)
Ethnicity	Number	Fraction
Slovak	4545	93.75%
Not found out	240	4.95%
Czech	56	1.15%
Total	4848	

In year 2021 was 4848 people by ethnicity 4545 as Slovak, 240 as Not found out, 56 as Czech, 26 as Ukrainian, 21 as Other, 17 as Romani, 8 as Rusyn, 6 as Serbian, 6 as Romanian, 6 as Hungarian, 4 as Polish, 4 as Moravian, 3 as Croatian, 3 as English, 2 as Jewish, 2 as Russian, 1 as Italian, 1 as German and 1 as Greek.

Note on population: The difference values of population numbers in the table "Population statistic" and in the sections "Ethnicity" & "Religion" is caused by the use of various statistical methods.

=== Religion ===
Census 2021 (1+ %)
Religion	Number	Fraction
None	1935	39.91%
Evangelical Church	1623	33.48%
Roman Catholic Church	888	18.32%
Not found out	227	4.68%
Total	4848	

In year 2021 was 4848 people by religion 1935 from None, 1623 from Evangelical Church, 888 from Roman Catholic Church, 227 from Not found out, 35 from Jehovah's Witnesses, 34 from Eastern Orthodox Church, 27 from Greek Catholic Church, 21 from Ad hoc movements, 17 from Other, 9 from United Methodist Church, 7 from Christian Congregations in Slovakia, 6 from Buddhism, 5 from Other and not ascertained christian church, 5 from Baptists Church, 2 from Paganism and natural spirituality, 1 from Jewish community, 1 from Old Catholic Church, 1 from Calvinist Church, 1 from Islam, 1 from Czechoslovak Hussite Church, 1 from Church of Jesus Christ of Latter-day Saints and 1 from Bahá'i Community.

According to the 2001 census, 92.2% of inhabitants were Slovaks and 0.8% Czechs. The religious makeup was 38.5% Lutherans, 24.9% Roman Catholics, and 22.5% people with no religious affiliation.

== Sights ==
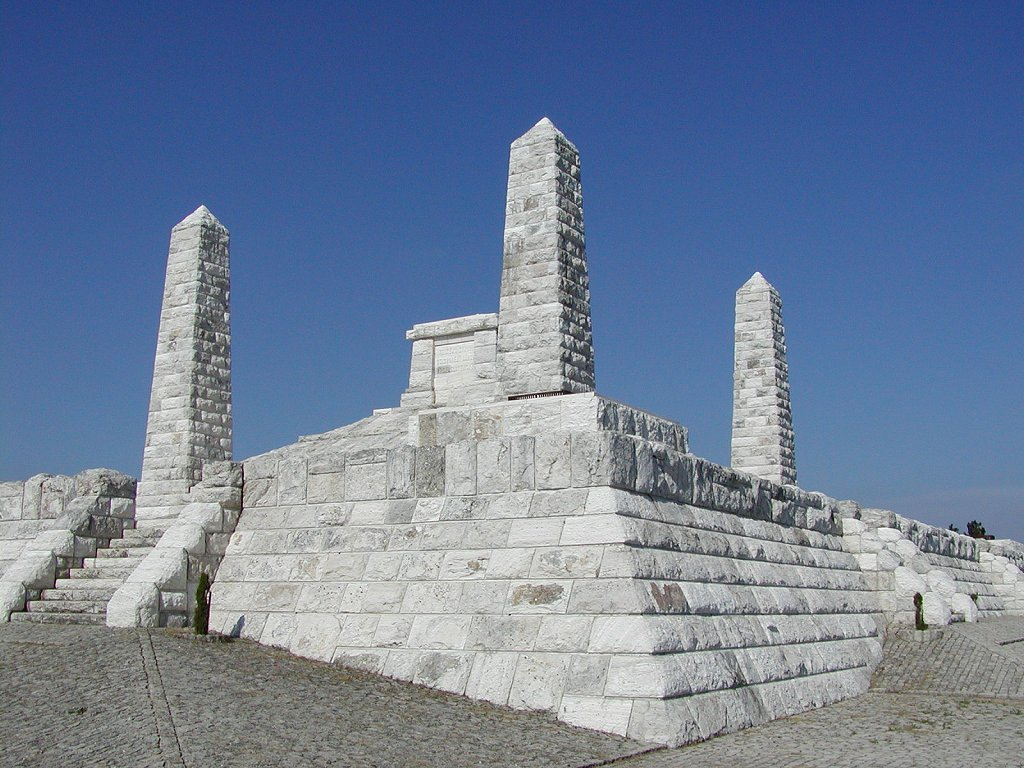
Štefánik's Tomb

The monumental tomb of Milan Rastislav Štefánik is located on the Bradlo hill (543 metres (1,781 ft), approximately three kilometres from the town, on the road to Košariská. The monument's construction started in 1924, five years after Štefánik's death and was finished in 1928. The tomb was designed by architect Dušan Jurkovič.

== Twin towns — sister cities ==
Brezová pod Bradlom is twinned with:

- Břeclav, Czech Republic
- Paulhan, France

== See also ==
- List of municipalities and towns in Slovakia

== Genealogical resources ==
The records for genealogical research are available at the state archive "Štátny archív in Bratislava, Slovakia"

- Roman Catholic church records (births/marriages/deaths): 1733-1910 (parish A)
- Lutheran church records (births/marriages/deaths): 1720-1902 (parish A)
