= Milan Rastislav Štefánik =

Slovak politician, aviator, and astronomer (1880–1919)

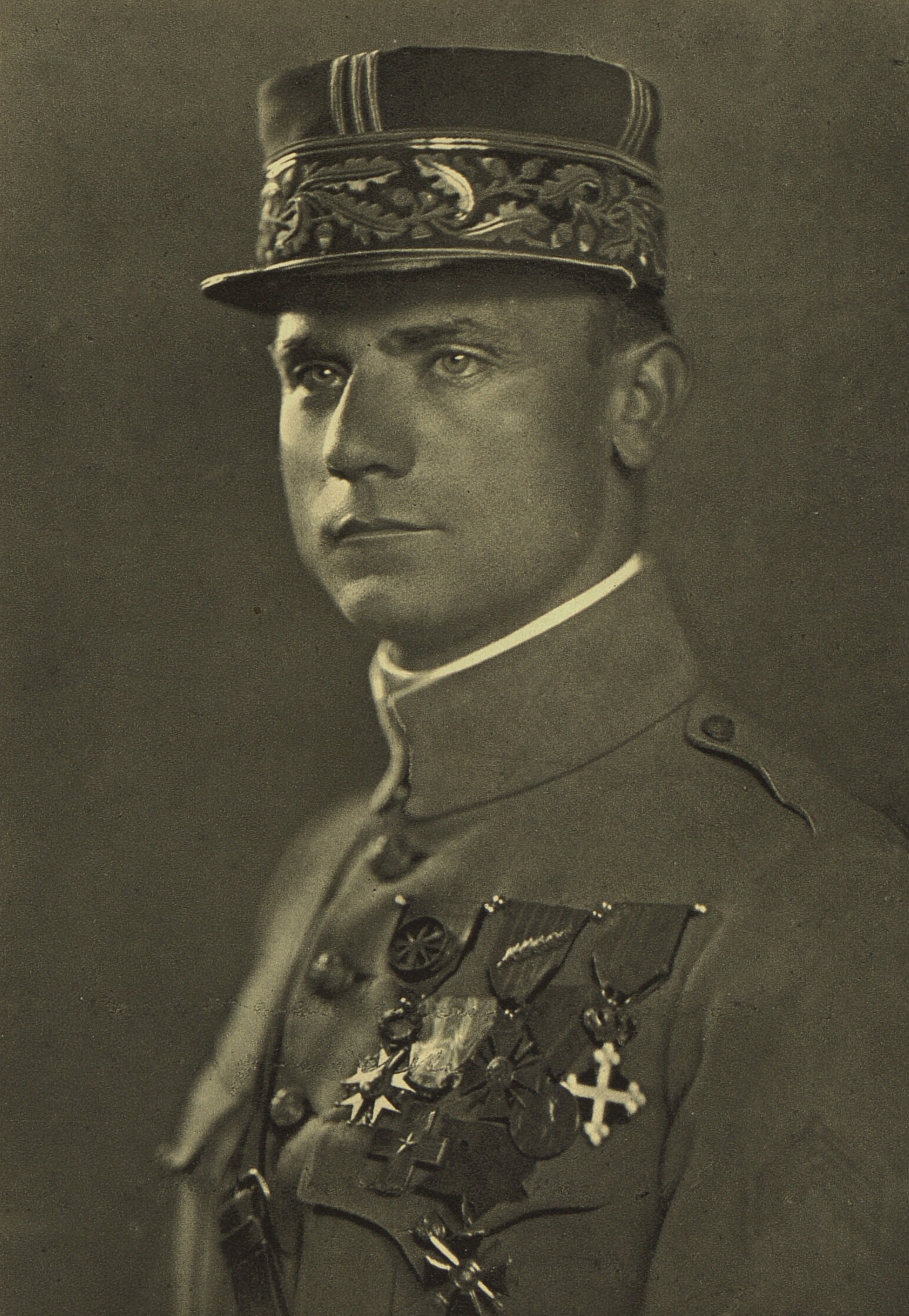

1st Minister of War of Czechoslovakia
- In office 29 October 1918 – 4 May 1919

Personal details
- Born: 21 July 1880 Kosaras, Nyitra County, Kingdom of Hungary, Austria-Hungary (now Slovakia)
- Died: 4 May 1919 (aged 38) Ivanka pri Dunaji, Czechoslovakia (now Slovakia)
- Resting place: Brezová pod Bradlom, Slovakia
- Citizenship: Austria-Hungary (until 1912); France (from 1912); Czechoslovakia (from 1918) (Note: Štefánik died before the Czechoslovak Citizenship Act came into effect in 1920, but the law stated that anyone who had died between the proclamation of Czechoslovakia in 1918 up until that point that had qualified for citizenship would be retroactively considered citizens.)
- Occupation: Military, astronomer, mathematician, aircraft pilot, meteorologist
- Awards: Légion d'honneur Prix Jules Janssen (1907); Croix de guerre 1914–1918 (France); Medal for the War Wounded(France); War Merit Cross (Italy); Order of Saints Maurice and Lazarus; Order of Saint Vladimir; Czechoslovak War Cross 1918; Order of the White Lion

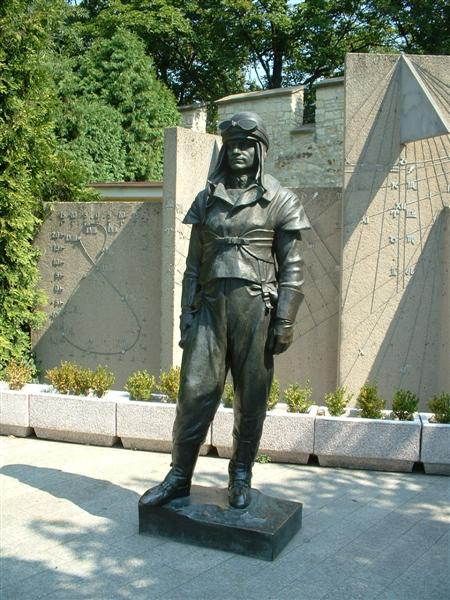
Štefánik's statue on Prague's Petřín

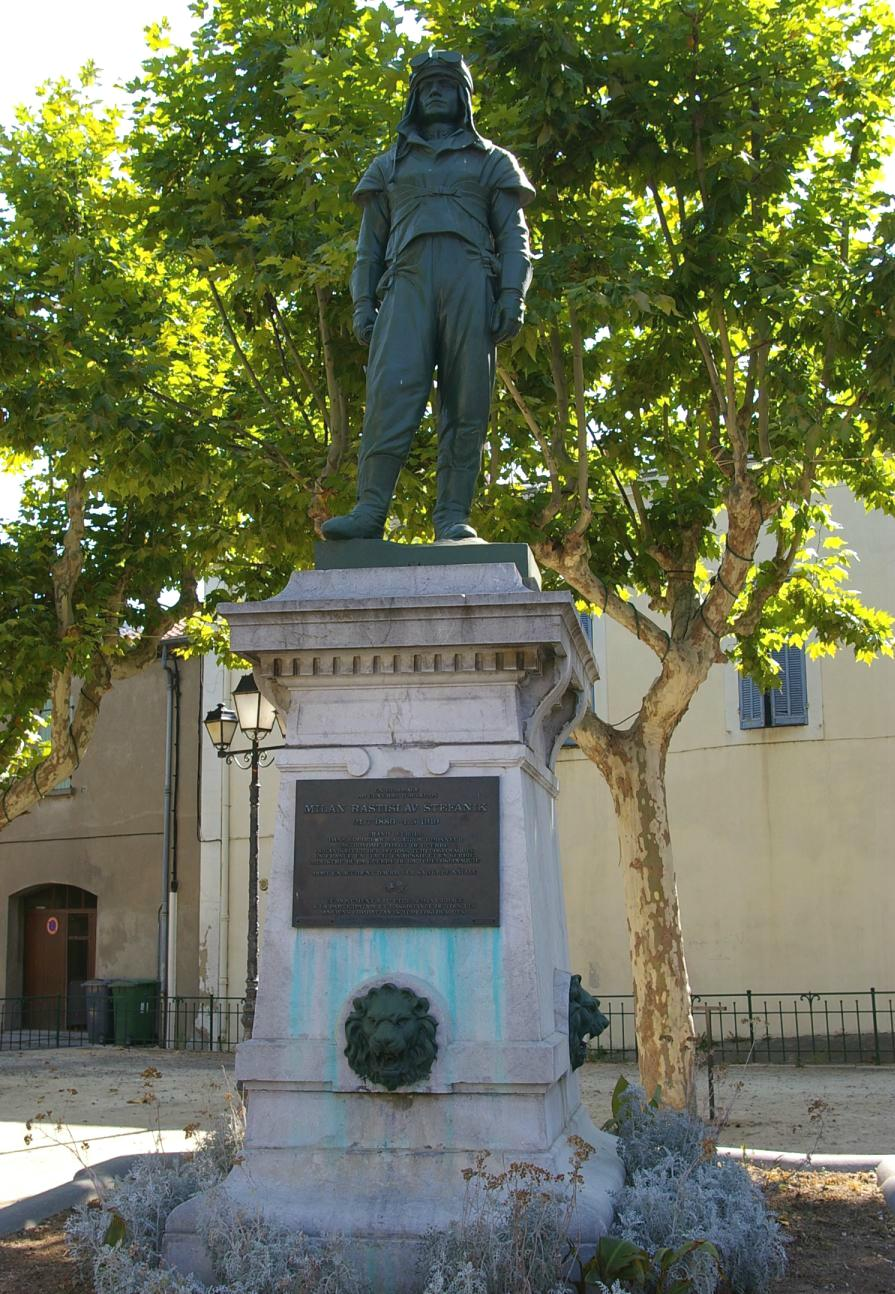
Identical statue atop war memorial in Paulhan, France

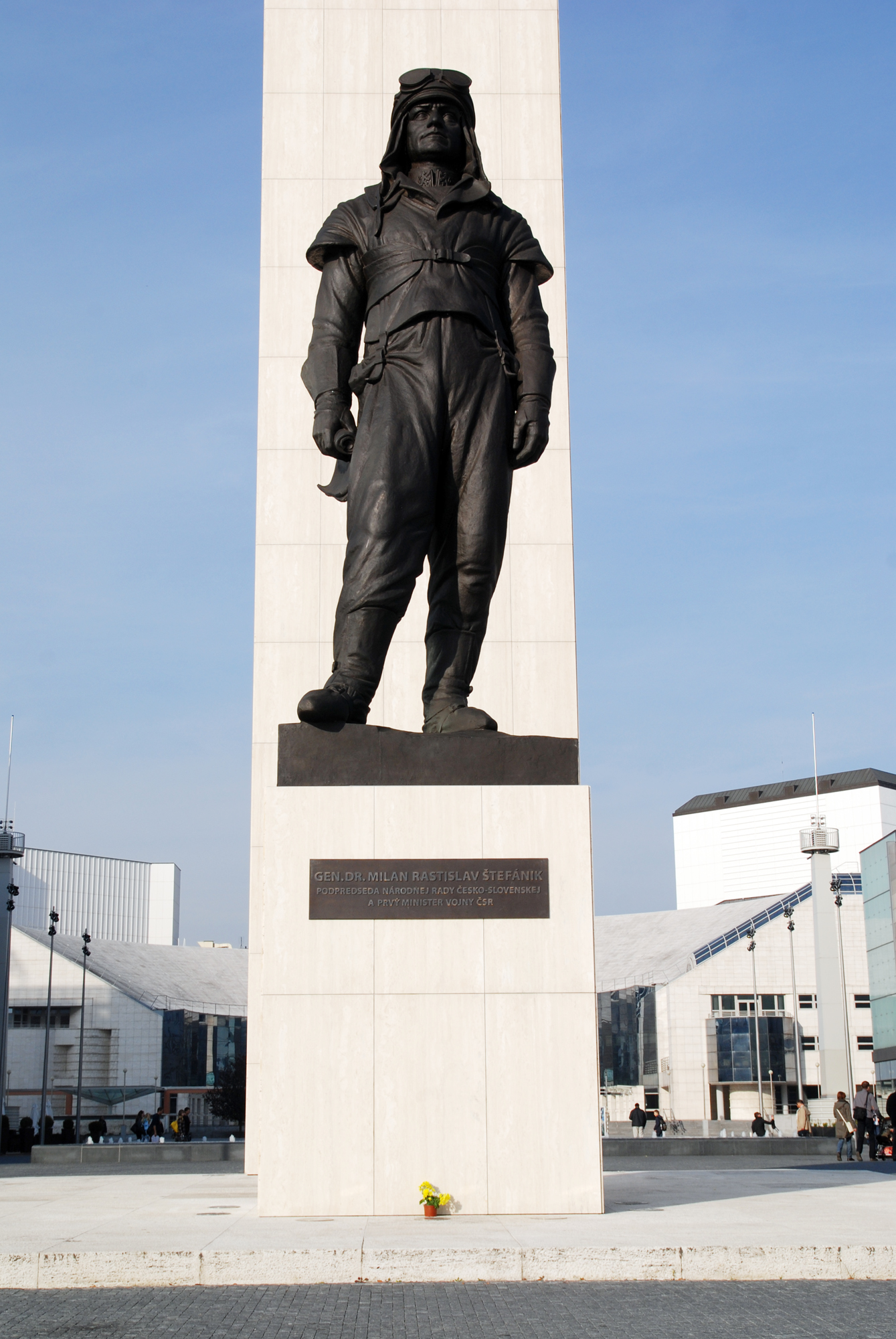
Statue in Bratislava

Milan Rastislav Štefánik (Slovak: [ˈmilan ˈrascislaw ˈʂcefaːɲik]; 21 July 1880 – 4 May 1919) was a Slovak politician, diplomat, aviator and astronomer. During World War I, he served at the same time as a general in the French Army and as Minister of War for Czechoslovakia. As one of the leading members of the Czechoslovak National Council (the resistance government), he contributed decisively to the cause of Czechoslovak sovereignty, since the status of Czech- and Slovak-populated territories was one of those in question until shortly before the dissolution of Austria-Hungary in 1918. His personal motto was "To Believe, To Love, To Work" (Slovak: Veriť, milovať, pracovať).

== Background ==
Štefánik was born in Kosaras, Nyitra County, Kingdom of Hungary, Austria-Hungary (now Košariská, Slovakia), on 21 July 1880. He had 11 brothers and sisters, two of whom died young. His father, Pavol Štefánik, was a local Lutheran pastor, and his mother was Albertína Jurenková. He attended schools in Bratislava, Sopron and Szarvas.

In 1898, he began studying construction engineering in Prague. In 1900, he transferred his studies to Charles University, where he attended lectures in astronomy, physics, optics, mathematics and philosophy. For the 1902 summer semester, he went to university in Zürich. The Prague years had a great impact on Štefánik because he met many important personalities there. The philosophy lectures were given by Tomáš Garrigue Masaryk, the future first president of Czechoslovakia, who inspired Štefánik with the idea of co-operation between the Czechs and the Slovaks. Furthermore, Štefánik very actively participated in the work of the Slovak student association, Detvan, (and within Detvan, the so-called Hlasists group); he became acquainted with Vavro Šrobár. His studies were financed largely by Czech associations, including Českoslovanská jednota (Czechoslavic Unity) and Radhošť since he could not afford them himself. In Prague, he wrote political and artistic texts in which he tried to inform the Czechs of the disastrous situation of the Slovaks at that time. He graduated in 1904 with a doctorate in philosophy and with knowledge of astronomy: his thesis is about a supernova that was appeared in the constellation Cassiopeia in 1572.

== Scientist ==
In 1904, he went to Paris to find a job in astronomy with a recommendation from a Czech professor who was known in Paris. Initially, he had no money and no command of French, but he was nevertheless able to obtain a job at the famous Paris-Meudon Observatory after its director, Pierre Janssen, one of the cofounders of astrophysics, saw Štefánik's talent. Štefánik owed to Janssen and Camille Flammarion his social, political and scientific career. The observatory was the most important centre for astronomy at the time so he gained massive prestige from his job.

Between 20 June and 4 July 1905, Štefánik climbed Mont Blanc (he did so several more times in the following years) to observe the Moon and Mars. Then, he took part in an official French expedition to observe and record a full eclipse of the Sun in Alcossebre, Spain. He thus established his own reputation in French scientific society. He worked with Gaston Millochau, a member of the Académie Française, which made some of its members read his work. His studies and the results of his observations were published in reports to the Académie, and he received several awards for them. Later, he was invited to an international astronomer conference in Oxford on solar research. Between 1906 and 1908, he was co-director of the Mont Blanc observatories company.

In 1907, Štefánik received the Prix Jules Janssen, the highest award of the Société astronomique de France, the French astronomical society.

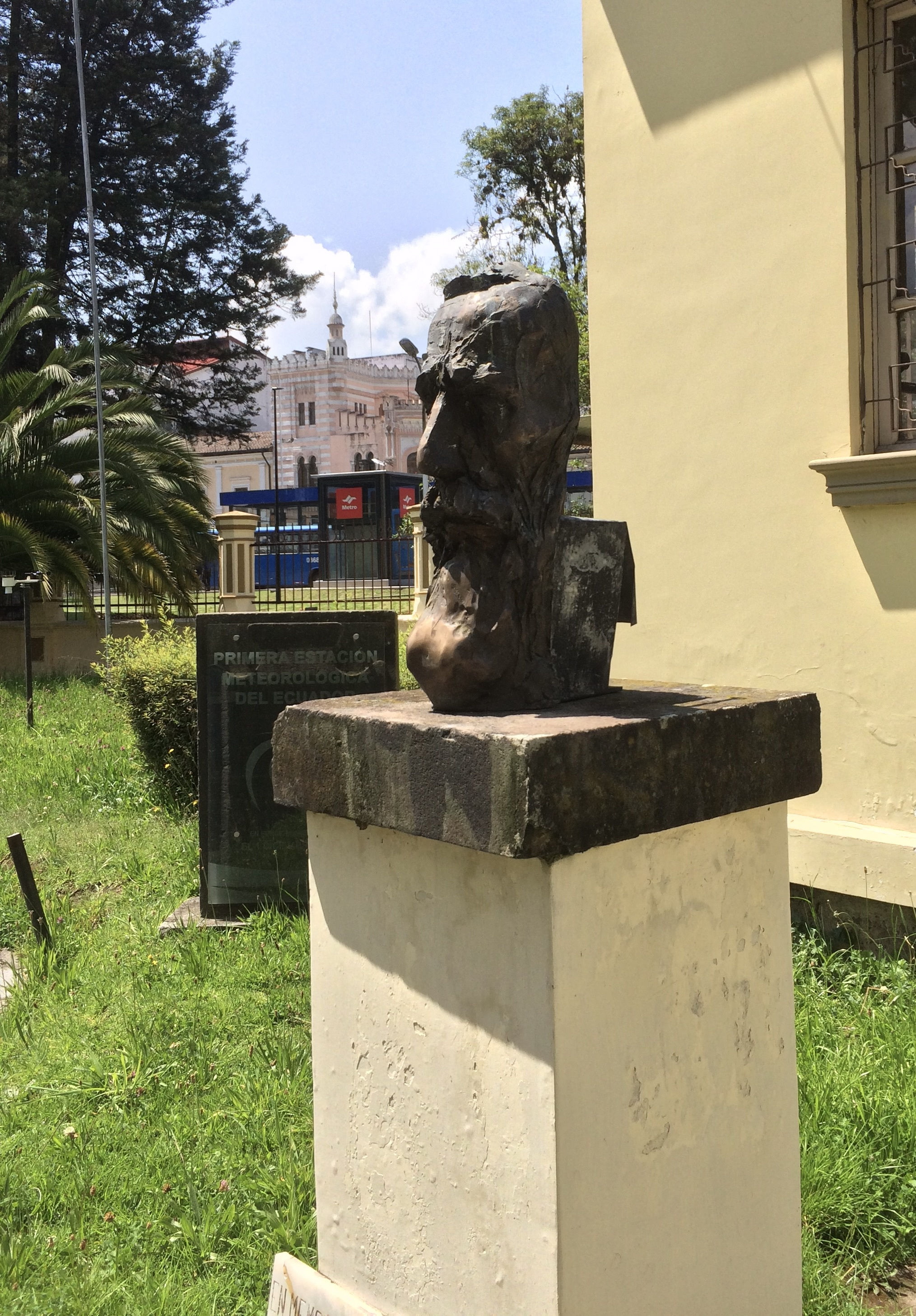
Bust at Quito's Astronomical Observatory.

At the end of 1907, however, Janssen died and Štefánik lost his job. Since 1908, he had been charged by the French authorities with astronomical and meteorological observations, (mainly observations of solar eclipses) and political tasks in various countries all over the world, including (Algeria, Morocco, Turkistan, Russia, India, the United States, Panama, Brazil, Ecuador, Australia, New Zealand, Tahiti, Fiji, and Tonga). In Tahiti, he also built an observatory and a network of meteorological stations (rumour has it that much of his time in the Pacific Ocean was spent on spying on German positions). Between the trips, he regularly returned home to Košariská (the last time in 1913 for his father's funeral). In South America (especially in the Galapagos Islands in Ecuador), he had an opportunity to show his diplomatic skills for the first time.

In 1912, a mission from the Bureau des Longitudes, based in France, was led by Milan Rastislav Štefánik, with the assistance of Jaromír Králiček. Štefánik and Králiček arrived in Rio de Janeiro aboard the French steamship Amazone on 10 September 1912. Their equipment crates were promptly cleared by customs with the authorization of the Brazilian government. Štefánik brought with great consideration a set of equipment intended for the Brazilian National Observatory, which Morize had ordered from manufacturers in January 1912 to be used by the Brazilian team in the observation of the eclipse. This equipment included a Mailhat telescope with an impressive 8-meter focal length and a 15-centimeter aperture, coupled with a coelostat from the same manufacturer. The French team had the objectives of photographing the solar corona and conducting spectroscopic studies. They set up in a location near Passa Quatro (Minas Gerais), where they joined the main team of the National Observatory's expedition. In the city of Passa Quatro, there is a bust in honor of the astronomer Milan Rastislav Štefánik. What drew attention was that their equipment crates were immediately released by customs, thanks to the authorization of the Brazilian government.

Milan Rastislav Štefánik showed great generosity by bringing a set of equipment intended for the Brazilian National Observatory to be used by the Brazilian team in observing the eclipse. This set included an impressive Mailhat telescope with an 8-meter focal length and a 15-centimeter aperture. Štefánik's presence and his equipment were valuable contributions to the advancement of science and astronomical research in Brazil at that time.

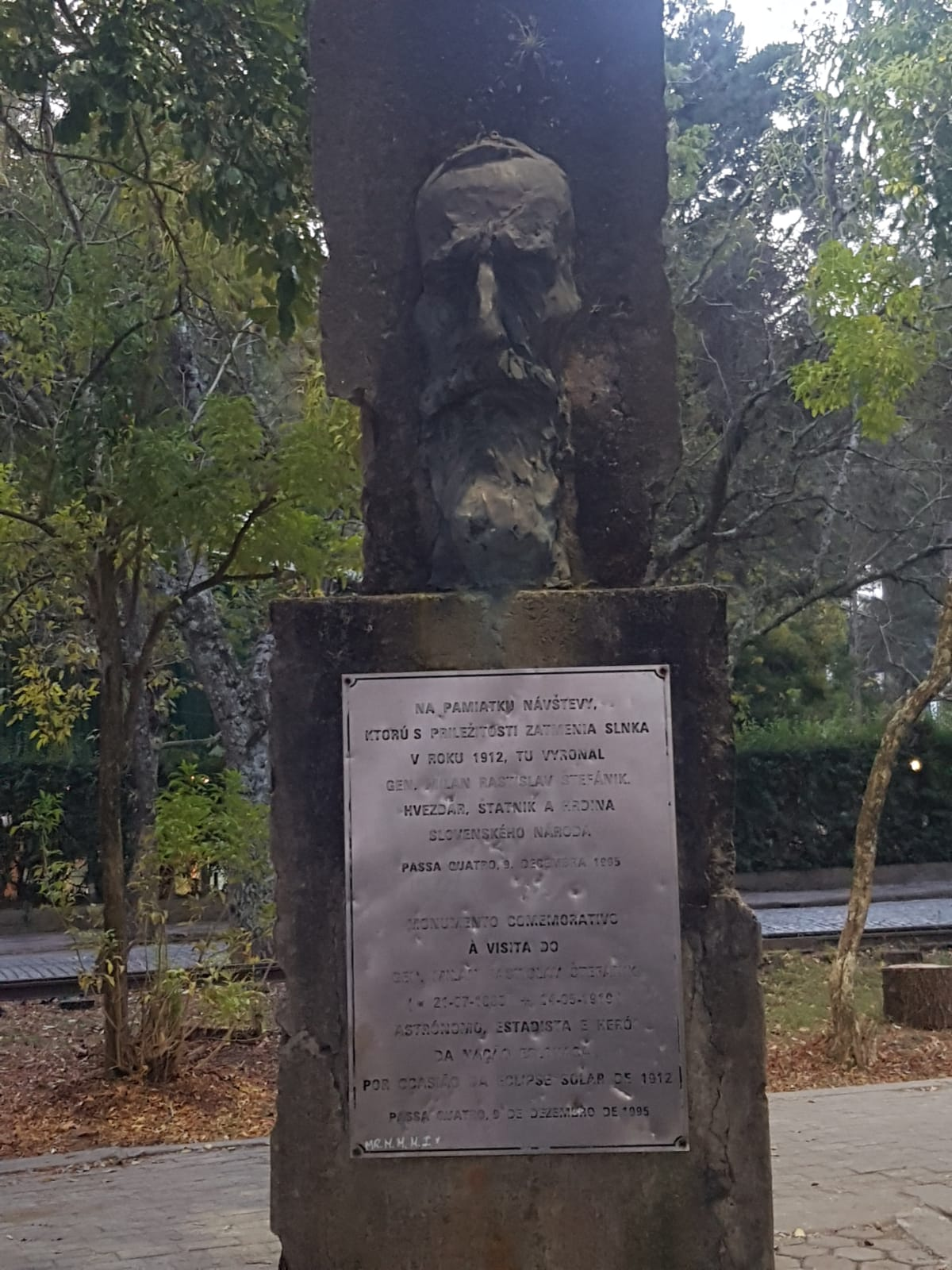
Bust of Milan Rastislav Štefánik at Hvezdár in Passa Quatro, MG, Brazil

Štefánik worked in astrophysics and solar physics, and became well known for his spectral analysis of the Sun's corona. He was involved in perfecting spectrography and has been considered a predecessor of Bernard Lyot. He also attempted to construct a machine for colour photography and cinematography, and he had his design patented in 1911.

== Diplomacy ==
In addition to his scientific missions overseas, he also performed diplomatic tasks. He established contacts and friendships with leading scientific, artistic, political, diplomatic and business personalities. He participated in the establishment of business enterprises in France and other countries. His friends included physicist Henri Poincaré, Aymar de la Baume, Joseph Vallot (the richest man in France), architect Gustave Eiffel, Roland Bonaparte, Prime Minister Camille Chautemps, a French entrepreneur called Devousoud from Chamonix, American astronomer and admiral Simon Newcomb and American diplomat David Jayne Hill. In 1912, he received French citizenship, recognition and access to the French élite. On 20 October 1917, he was made a Grand Officier of the Legion of Honour. At the same time, he had some personal problems and a serious stomach illness, which did not get better even after two surgeries. Moreover, World War I had started in Europe.

== World War I ==
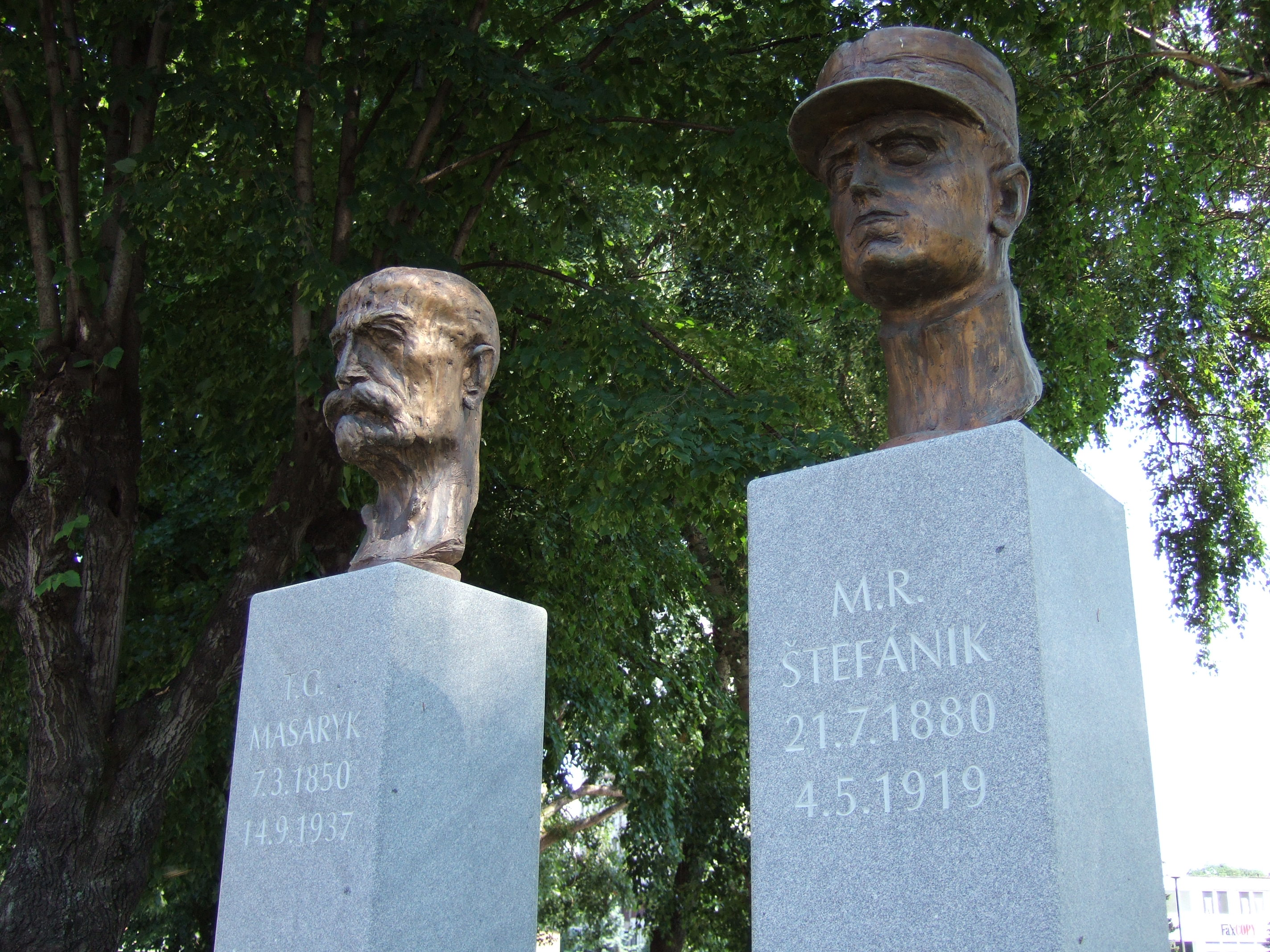
Masaryk and Štefánik's monument in Košice, Slovakia.

Štefánik believed that defeat of Austria-Hungary and of Imperial Germany would offer an opportunity for the Slovaks and the Czechs to gain independence from Austria-Hungary after the war. Therefore, he joined the French army and trained to become an aviator. He flew MFS-54s for the 10th Army on the Artois and was later transferred to MFS 99 Squadron on the Serbian Front. In May 1915, he flew a total of 30 missions over enemy territory. The Serbian campaign was unsuccessful, but French aviator Louis Paulhan is credited with the world's first medevac by flying the seriously-ill Štefánik to safety.

Štefánik returned to Paris at the end of 1915, where he became acquainted with Edvard Beneš and renewed his association with his former professor, Masaryk. In 1916, the three men founded the Czechoslovak National Council, which led to the government of Czecho-Slovak resistance abroad and to the creation of Czechoslovakia in 1918. After 1917, he became vice president of the council. His diplomatic skills made Štefánik able to help arrange a meeting of Masaryk and Beneš to meet and obtain the support of some of the most important personalities of the Triple Entente. For example, he organized Masaryk's meeting with the French prime minister, Aristide Briand.

In 1916, Štefánik and the Czecho-Slovak resistance started to organise the Czechoslovak Legions to fight against Austria-Hungary and Germany. For this purpose, Štefánik, both as the Czechoslovak Minister of War and as a French general, went to Russia in February 1917 and then to the United States, in the meantime he met Thomas Garrigue Masaryk in London in April. He also organized legions in France and Italy. It was largely his personal diplomatic skills and contacts that made the Entente recognise the Czechoslovak National Council as a de facto government and the Czechoslovak Legions as allied forces in the summer and the autumn of 1918.

In May 1918 Štefánik went to Siberia to try to rally the Czechoslovak legions to a renewal of the Eastern Front, as Bolshevik Russia had withdrawn from the war by signing the Treaty of Brest-Litovsk with Germany and Austria-Hungary in March 1918. The Czechoslovak Legions rebelled against a subsequent Bolshevik order to disarm and so gained the support of the Allies. Štefánik then decided that his initial plan was no longer feasible.

== Independence ==
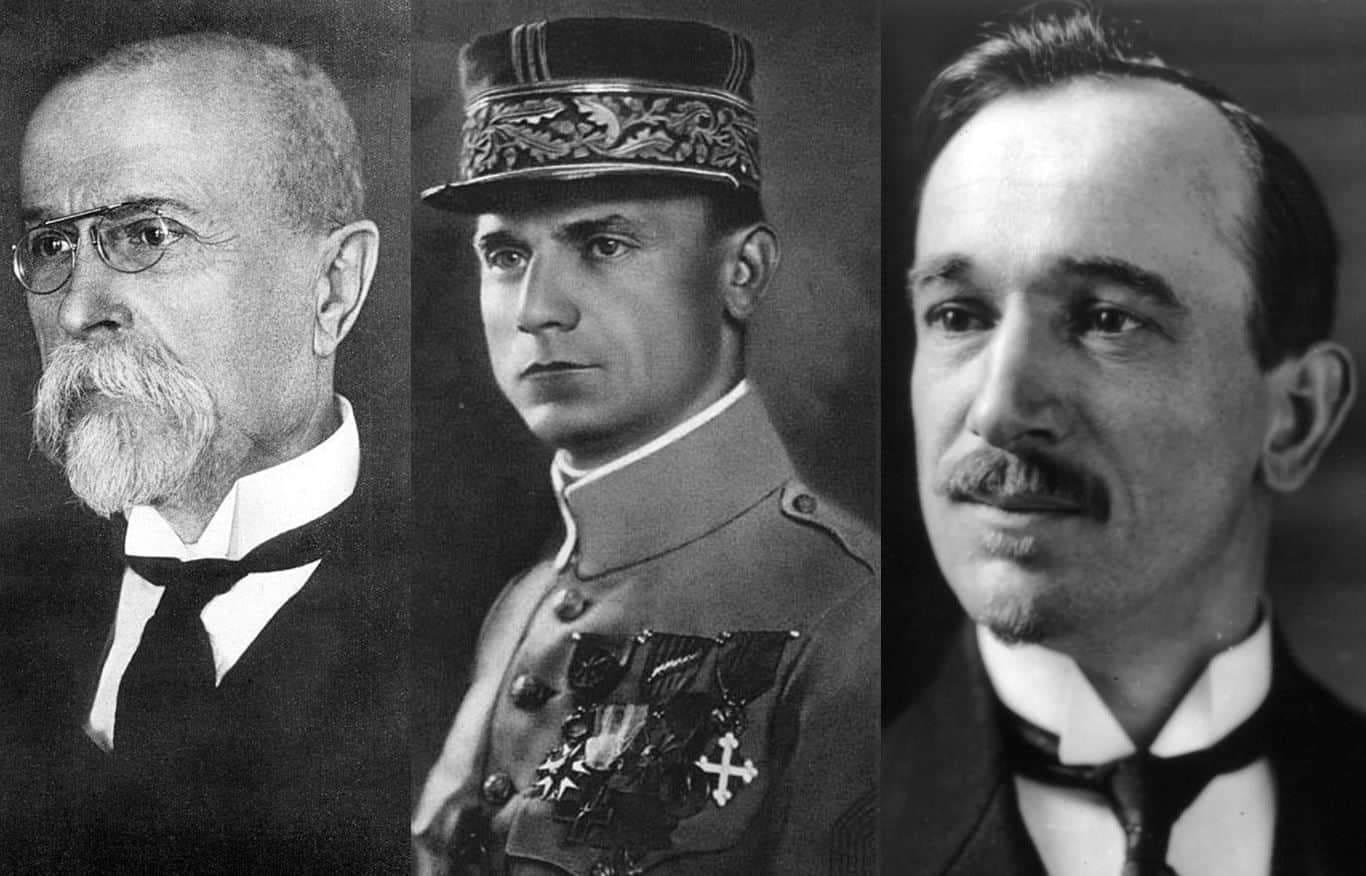
Triumvirate of Tomáš Garrigue Masaryk, Milan Rastislav Štefánik, and Edvard Beneš.

In January 1919 after the war ended, Štefánik went from Russia to France and Italy, where he organized the March retreat of Czechoslovak troops from Siberia to Paris. In addition, his diplomatic skills were needed to solve disagreements between the French and the Italian missions in Czechoslovakia. In April, he went from Paris to Rome to negotiate with the Italian Ministry of War, where he met with his fiancée, Giuliana Benzoni, for the last time. Then, he went to the main Italian military base in Padua, where he agreed with General Armando Diaz to dissolve the Italian military mission in Czechoslovakia.

Sources do not substantiate rumours of disagreements arising between Štefánik and Beneš or Masaryk, mainly on the position of Slovakia in Czechoslovakia. On the contrary, telegrams sent by Štefánik from Vladivostok to the Czechoslovak National Council in Paris on 7 December 1918 indicate that Štefánik had a good relationship with them. To Masaryk, he wrote "with my filial feelings and a great patriotic happiness, I salute you, venerable professor, as the first president of the Czechoslovak Republic".

To the President of the Council, Karel Kramář, he wrote,

"Thank you, my dear president, for having chosen me as member of our National Ministry. You and your other co-workers can be sure of my loyalty and my fraternal feelings".

To Beneš, he was even more friendly by using informal pronouns (he used formal pronouns to address Masaryk and Kramář):

"Mr. Beneš, Ministry of Foreign Affairs in Prague: "I hug you affectionately, my loyal and precious companion during the hours of anxiety". (The beginning can be translated instead as "I kiss you on the cheek".)

The telegrams appear to show that Štefánik gave his full support to the union of the Czechs and Slovaks that was led by Masaryk.

Masaryk continued to accord Štefánik his full confidence to the last days of his life, as demonstrated by the challenging issue that Štefánik had to solve while he was Minister of War of the Czechoslovak Republic: disputes with the military missions of France and Italy on Czechoslovak territory, according to his telegram to Masaryk on 21 April 1919, only a few days before Štefánik died.

== Death ==
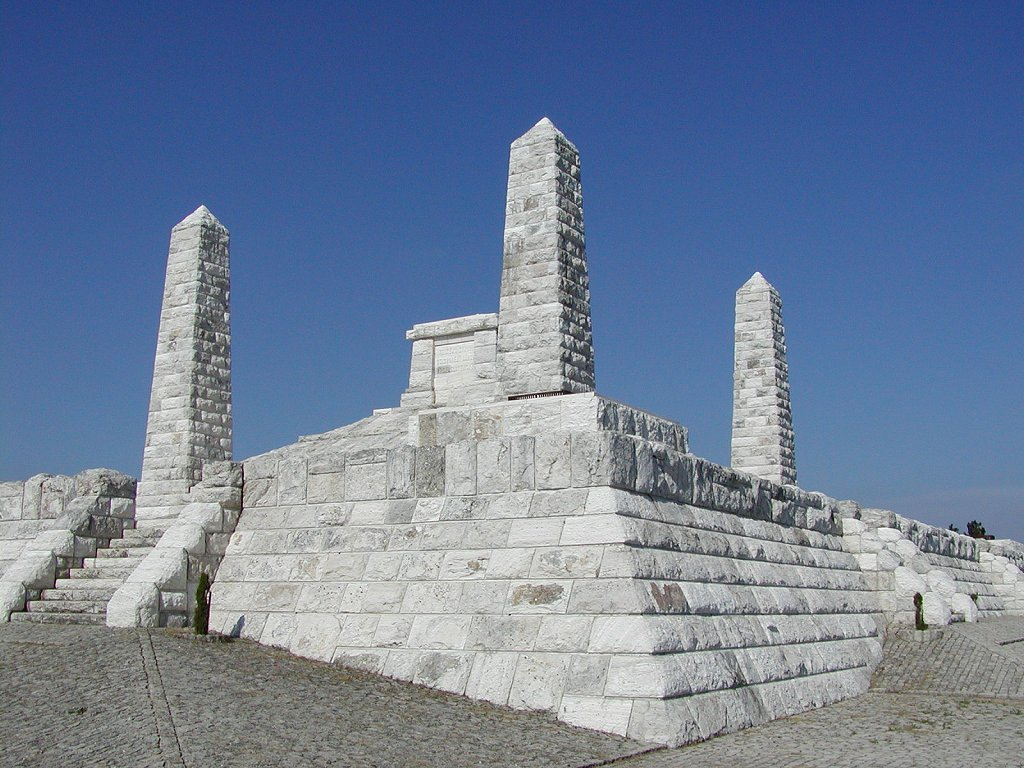
Štefánik's tomb

When Štefánik wanted to return home to see his family, he decided to fly from Campoformido, near Udine, Italy, and to use an Italian military plane, a Caproni Ca.3. On 4 May 1919, at around 11:00, his plane tried to land near Bratislava, a military conflict area between the First Republic of Czechoslovakia and the Hungarian Soviet Republic, but crashed near Ivanka pri Dunaji. Štefánik died, along with the rest of the crew (two Italian pilots, Colonel Giotto Mancinelli-Scotti and Sergeant Umberto Merlino, as well as a mechanic-radiotelegrapher, Gabriel Aggiusto).

At the time of the crash, Vavro Šrobár and his entire government had left Bratislava for Skalica, to plant trees as a memorial to the founding of the new Czechoslovak Republic. The Hungarian communists, in the middle of Bratislava's Franz Joseph Bridge, could not have shot down the plane.

The Italian plane's identifying colours, a rumour had it, were mistaken for the similar marking of a Hungarian plane so the unannounced, unknown airplane was shot down by the Czechoslovak Army. However, the respected Zrínyi Miklós National Defense University in Budapest, in a joint article with the Armed Forces Academy of General Milan Rastislav Štefánik in Slovakia, published a paper, citing the Italian eyewitness First Lieutenant Martinelli-Scotti:

"in the course of the first landing attempt, the wheels touched the landing path, after which the cooling water immediately started leaking. That caused the overheating of the engines. During the second landing attempt, one of the engines exploded, resulting in catastrophe".

The paper also stated that the accident report from the Italian inquiry board was biased toward ruling out both human error by the Italian crew and manufacturing defects.

== Legacy and awards ==
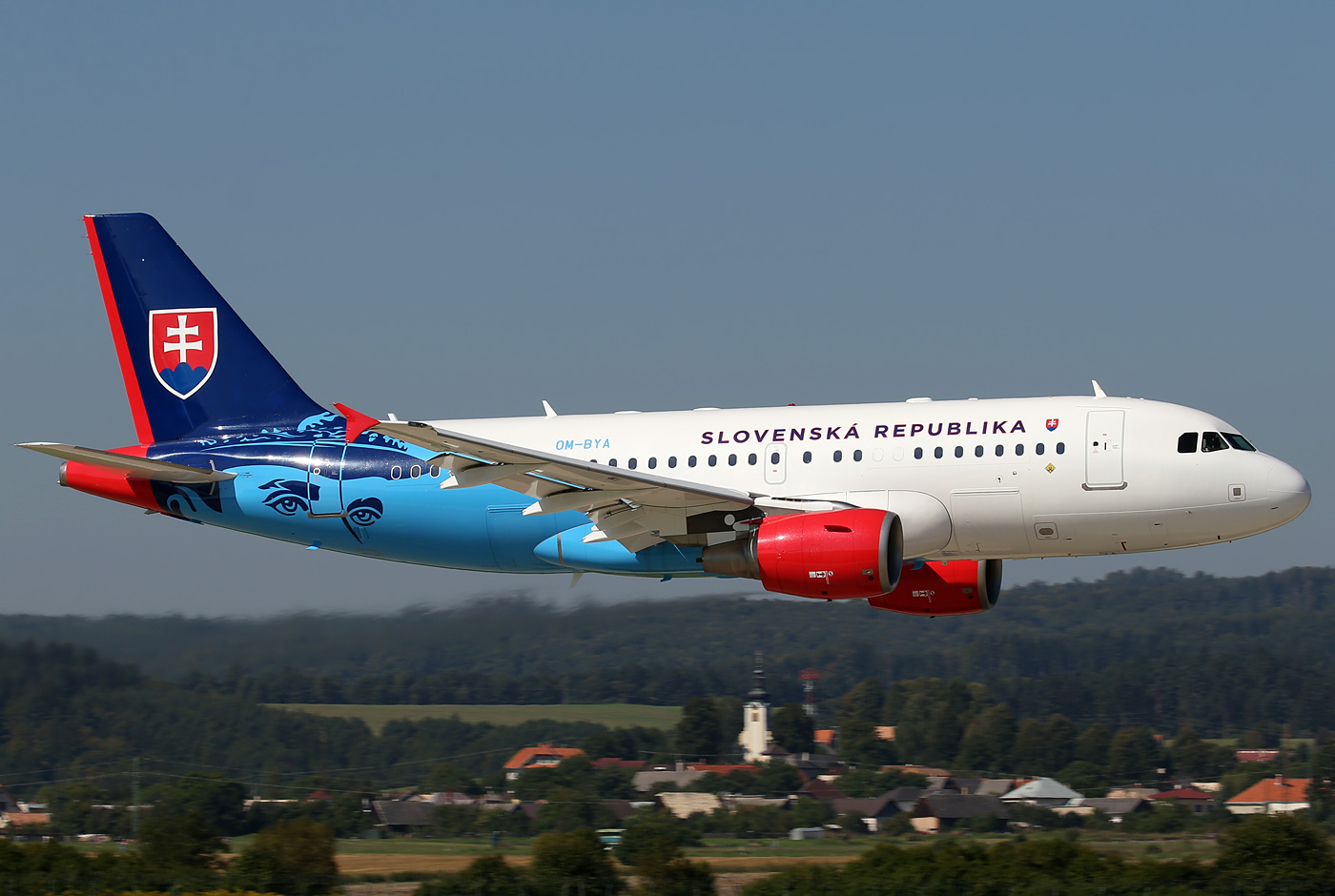
Airbus ACJ319 of Slovak Government Flying Service portraying Milan Rastislav Štefánik

Štefánik's tomb was built in 1927 to 1928 on Bradlo Hill in Brezová pod Bradlom. The monumental but austere memorial was designed by Dušan Jurkovič. The minor planet 3571 Milanštefánik (discovered 1982 at Kleť Observatory) was named after him.

Bratislava Airport was named M.R. Štefánik Airport. (Slovak: Letisko M. R. Štefánika)

Slovak Government Flying Service aircraft Airbus 319 and Fokker 100 are painted with Štefánik's portrait.

The Slovak Armed Forces Academy is named as Armed Forces Academy of General Milan Rastislav Štefánik.

The transport wing of the Slovak Air Force located at Malacky Air Base was named as Transport Wing of General Milan Rastislav Štefánik.

In 2019, Slovakia launched a 2 euro commemorative coin commemorating the 100th death anniversary of Štefánik.

In 2019, Štefánik was selected as the "Greatest Slovak" in the Slovak version of the British programme 100 Greatest Britons.

In 2020, Slovak Matica created a film about Štefánik "Visionary of Slovak Freedom" with the subtitle "Štefánik and the Slovaks in the first foreign Czech-Slovak resistance".

In 1914, Štefánik was awarded the Chevalier rank of the French Legion of Honour, in 1917, he was awarded the Officier rank and finally in 1919 the Commandeur rank. Furthermore, in France, in 1915 he was awarded the Croix de guerre and Medal for the War Wounded. In Italy, he was awarded the War Merit Cross and the Officer rank of the Order of Saints Maurice and Lazarus. In Russia, he was awarded the Order of Saint Vladimir, 4th class. Posthumously, he was awarded the Czechoslovak War Cross 1918. In 2023, he was posthumously awarded the Order of the White Lion 1st class, by the Czech president Petr Pavel.

== See also ==
- History of Slovakia
- History of Czechoslovakia
- M. R. Štefánik Airport
- List of firsts in aviation
