= Dušan Jurkovič =

Slovak architect

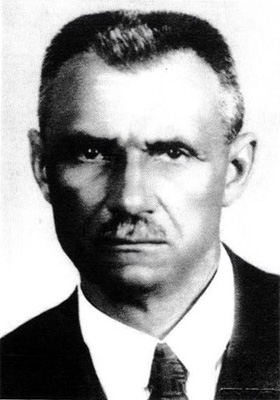
- Dušan Jurkovič
- Born: 23 August 1868; Turá Lúka; Austria-Hungary
- Died: 21 December 1947 (aged 79); Bratislava; Czechoslovakia
- Resting place: Brezová pod Bradlom
- Awards: National artist (1945); Order of Tomáš Garrigue Masaryk I. class, in memoriam (1991); Pribina cross I. class(2007)

Dušan Samo Jurkovič (23 August 1868, Turá Lúka – 21 December 1947, Bratislava) was a Slovak architect, furniture designer, artist and ethnographer. One of the best-known promoters of Slovak art in 20th century Czechoslovakia, he is remembered mostly due to his projects of numerous World War I cemeteries in Galicia and thanks to his wooden works of spa complex in Luhačovice and mountain cottage hotel Maměnka and canteen Libušín in Pustevny. Thanks to his artistic work with wood, he is referred to as "the poet of timber". His architectonic style was a unique fusion of folk architecture and then-popular architectonic styles, mostly associated with Art Nouveau. Jurkovič repeatedly stressed: "The work of art is rooted in the time. I also have always cautiously listened to its voice."

== Biography ==
Jurkovič was born on 23 August 1868 in Turá Lúka, Austria-Hungary (now part of Myjava, Slovakia), to a family of Slovak patriots. His grandfather was Samuel Jurkovič, the founder of the first Farmers Alliance in Slovakia, his uncle was Jozef Miloslav Hurban, a slovak writer, poet, priest and patriot, his father was a notary and his mother was a folk art connoisseur. He graduated from a local school in Sopron and moved to Vienna, where between 1884 and 1889 he studied at the National School of Industry under Camillo Sitte. He briefly worked in Martin, where he became fascinated with folk carpenters and their works in wood. Then he moved to Vsetín (eastern Moravia), where he continued his studies at the atelier of Michal Urbánek. Together with his bureau he co-authored the buildings of the 1895 Czech-Slavonic Ethnographic Exhibition in Prague and also authored numerous other buildings in Bohemia.

In 1899 he moved to Brno, where he designed his own house and a new lodging house for the local school. During his stay in Brno he became friends with local Czech writers Jiří Mahen, Mrštík brothers and Josef Merhaut. Among his best-known designs realized in Brno was a villa in Žabovřesky, combining local folk art with the state-of-the-art modernist trends of Vienna. He also authored the design of the Society of Friends of Arts building, a distant cousin to Viennese Wiener Werkstätte and the geometric school. He also prepared a project of reconstruction of the castle in Nové Město nad Metují.

Mobilized by the Austro-Hungarian Army during the World War I, he became one of the most notable members of the War Graves Unit. He authored approximately 35 war cemeteries near Gorlice in Galicia (now Poland), most of them heavily influenced by local Lemko (Rusyn) folk art and carpentry.

After the war he returned to newly founded Czechoslovakia and settled in Bratislava. Among the best known of his later works is the tombs of Jozef Miloslav Hurban and Milan Rastislav Štefánik, monument to Slovak National Uprising, and the cable car station at Lomnický štít in the High Tatras mountains. He died on 21 December 1947.

== Gallery ==
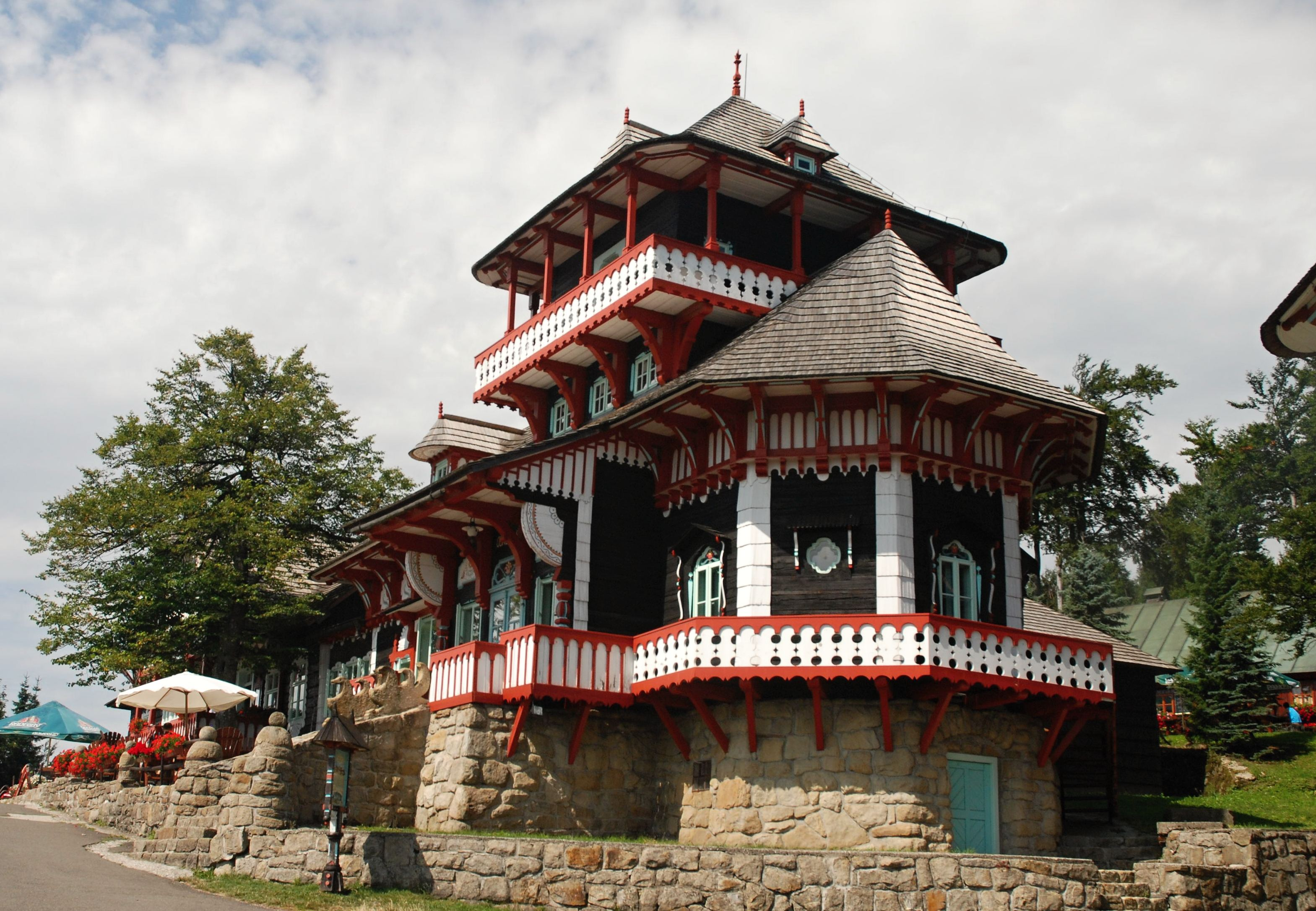
Mountain cottage Libušín in Pustevny, Czech Republic (1897–99)

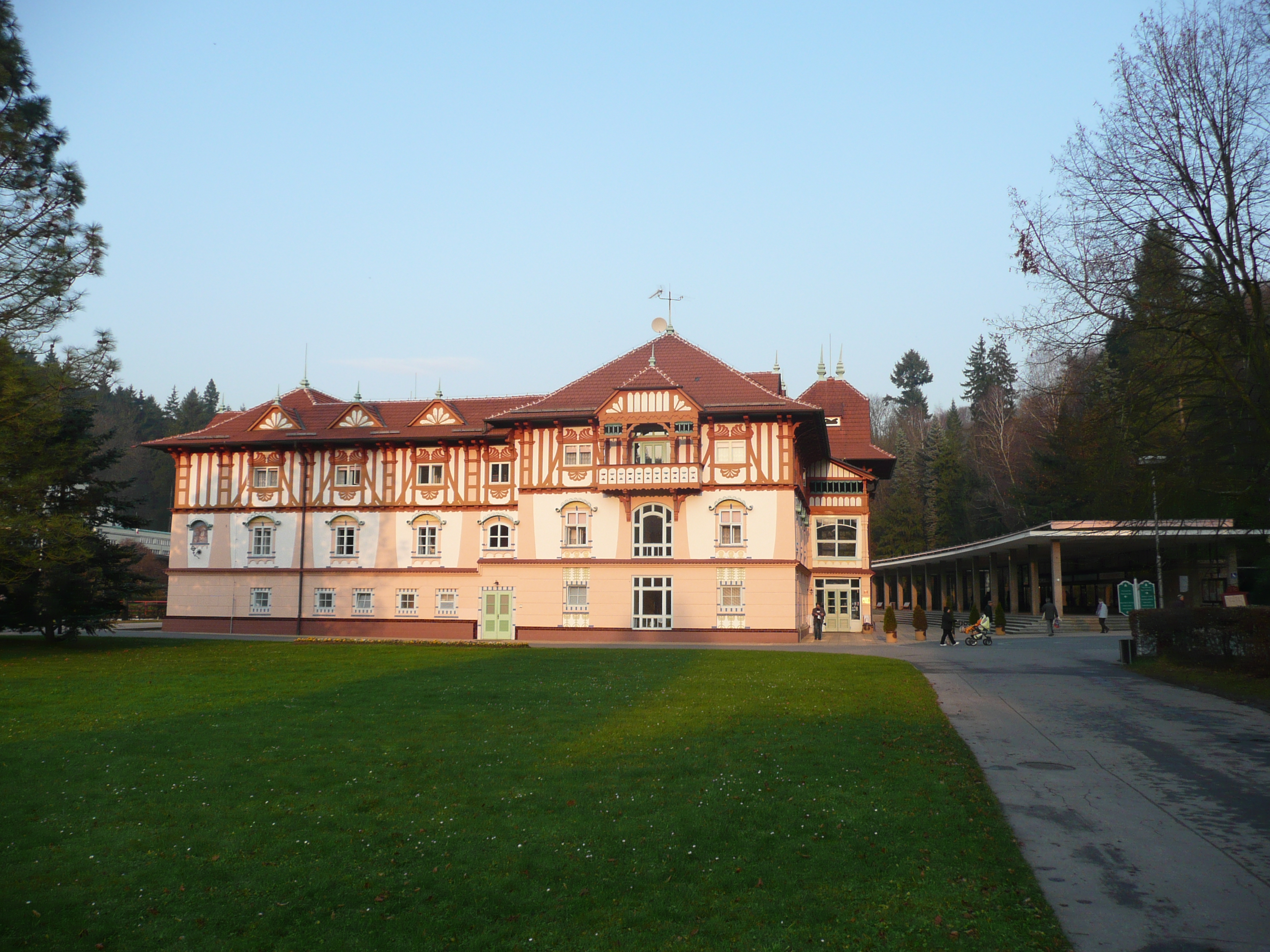
Spa house in Luhačovice, Czech Republic (1902)

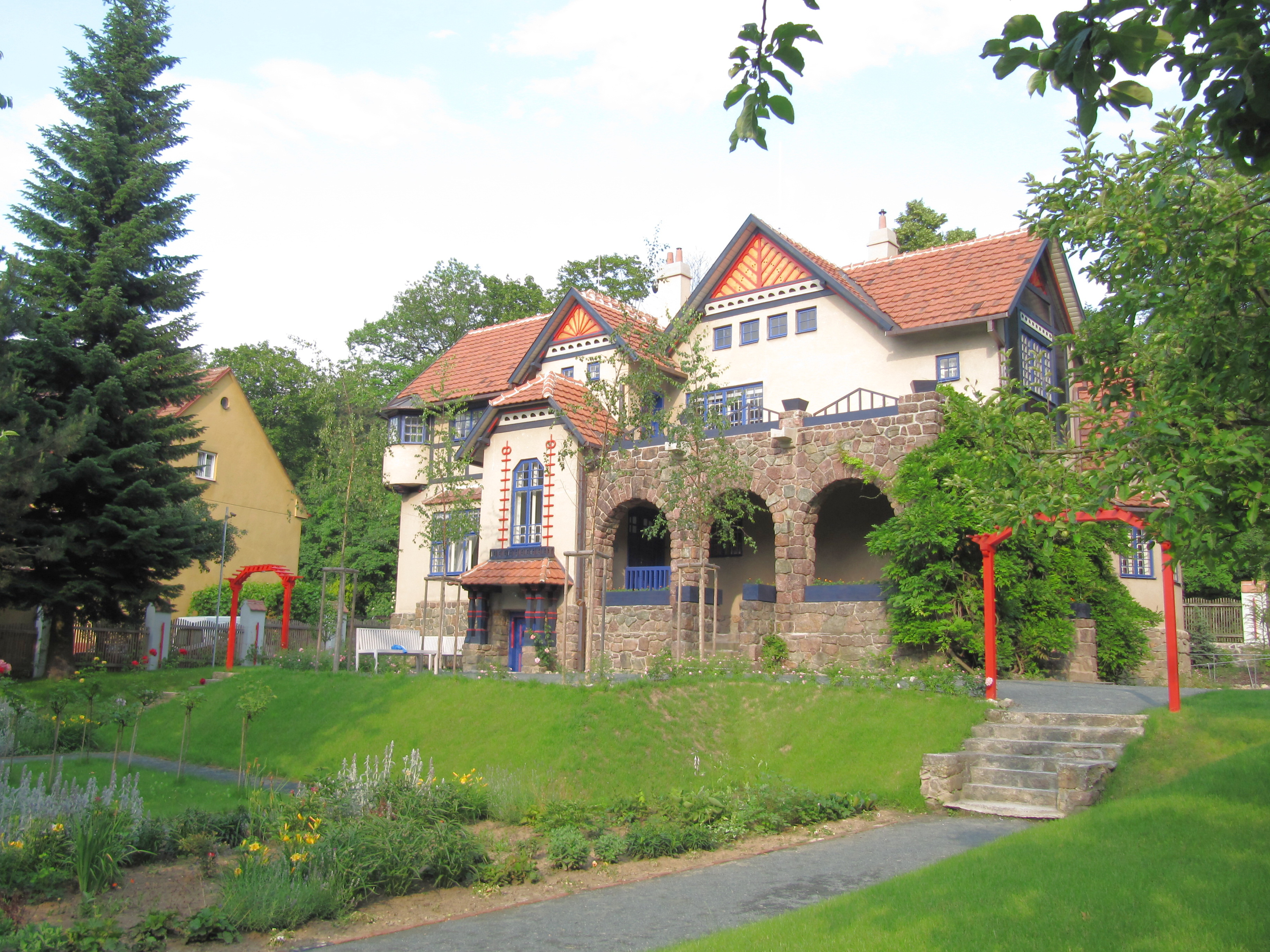
Own villa in Brno, Czech Republic (1906)

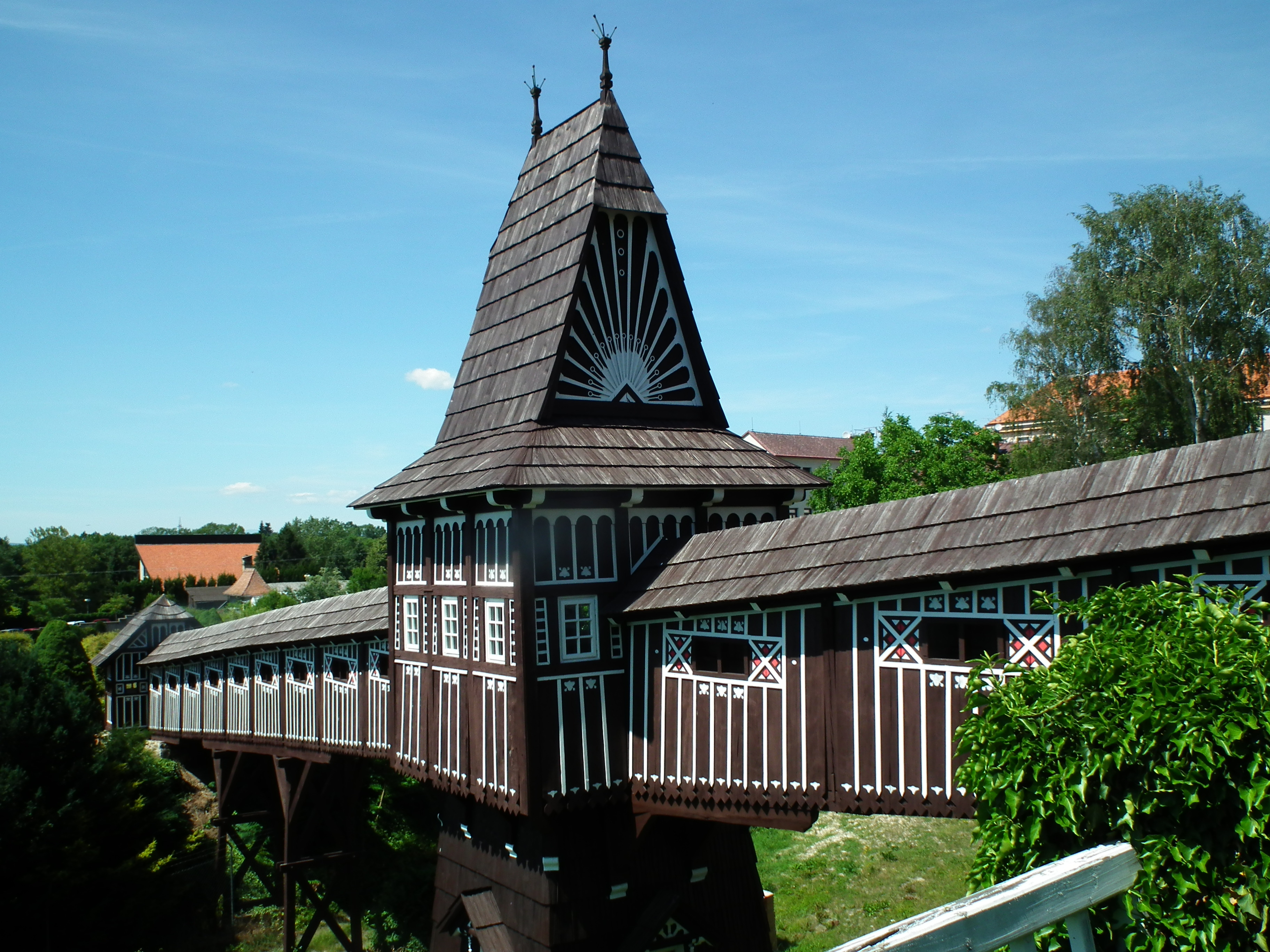
Jurkovič bridge in Nové Město nad Metují, Czech Republic (1910)

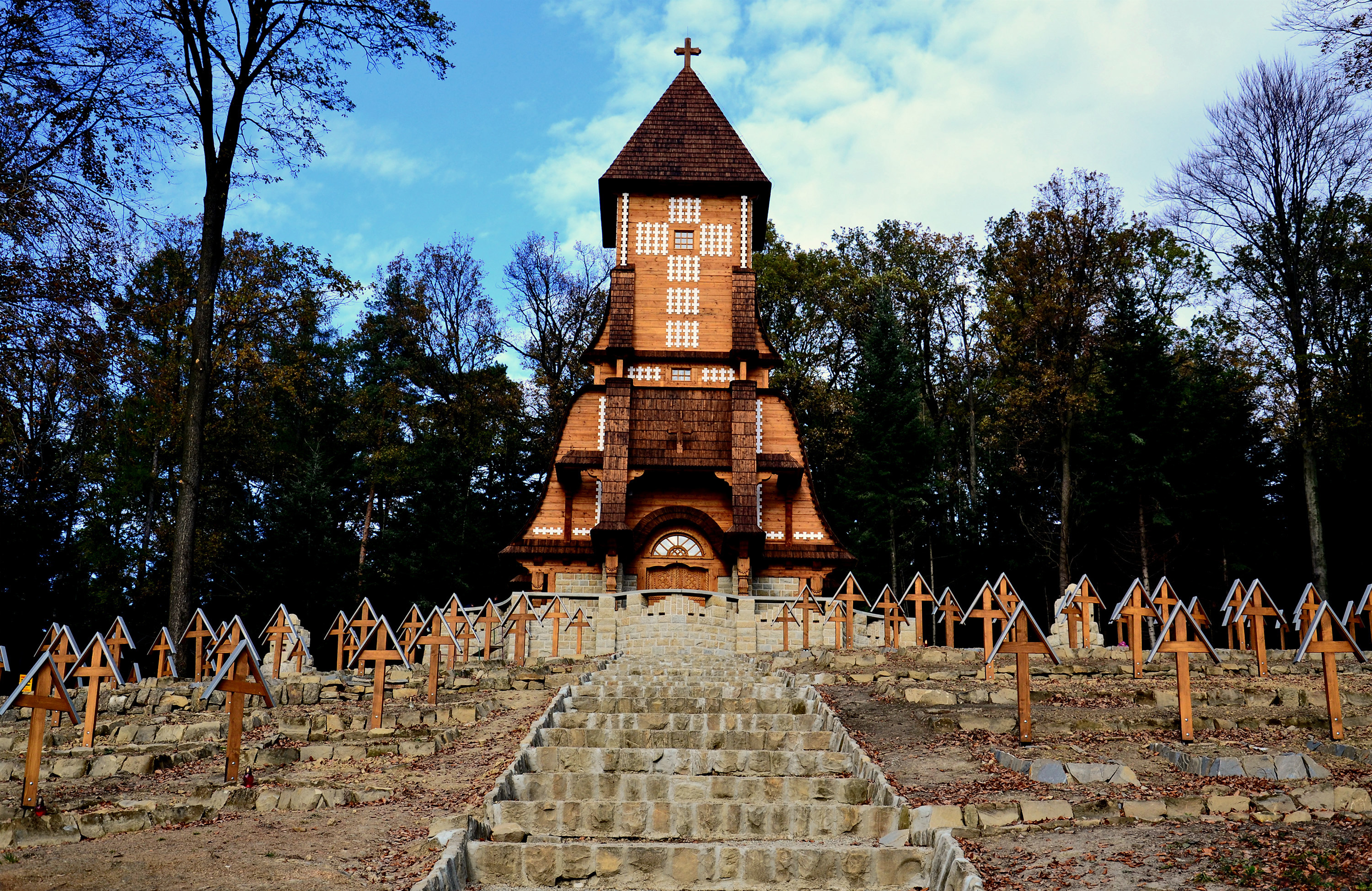
Cemetery No. 123 in Łużna, Poland (1915)

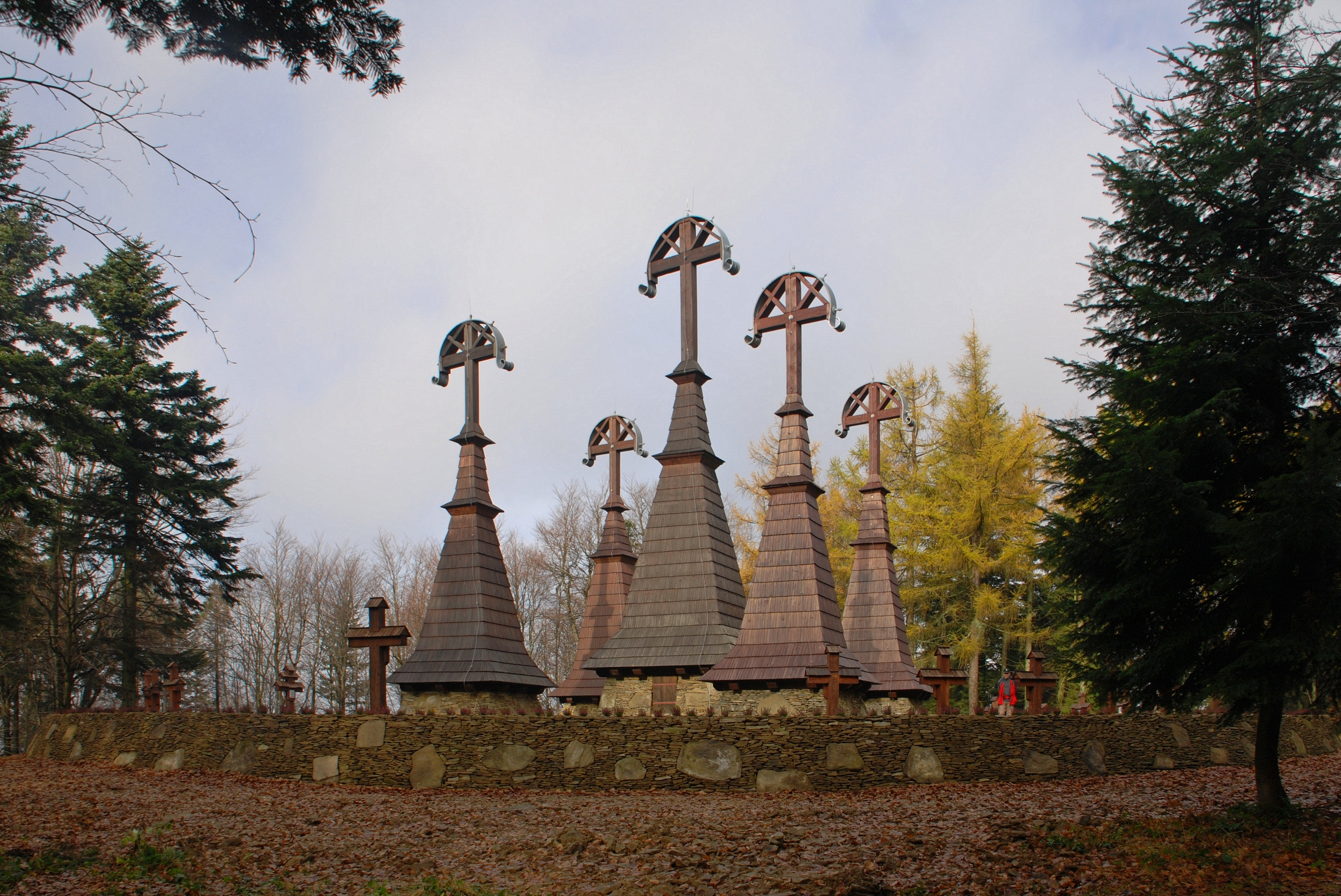
Cemetery No. 51 in Regietów, Poland (1915)

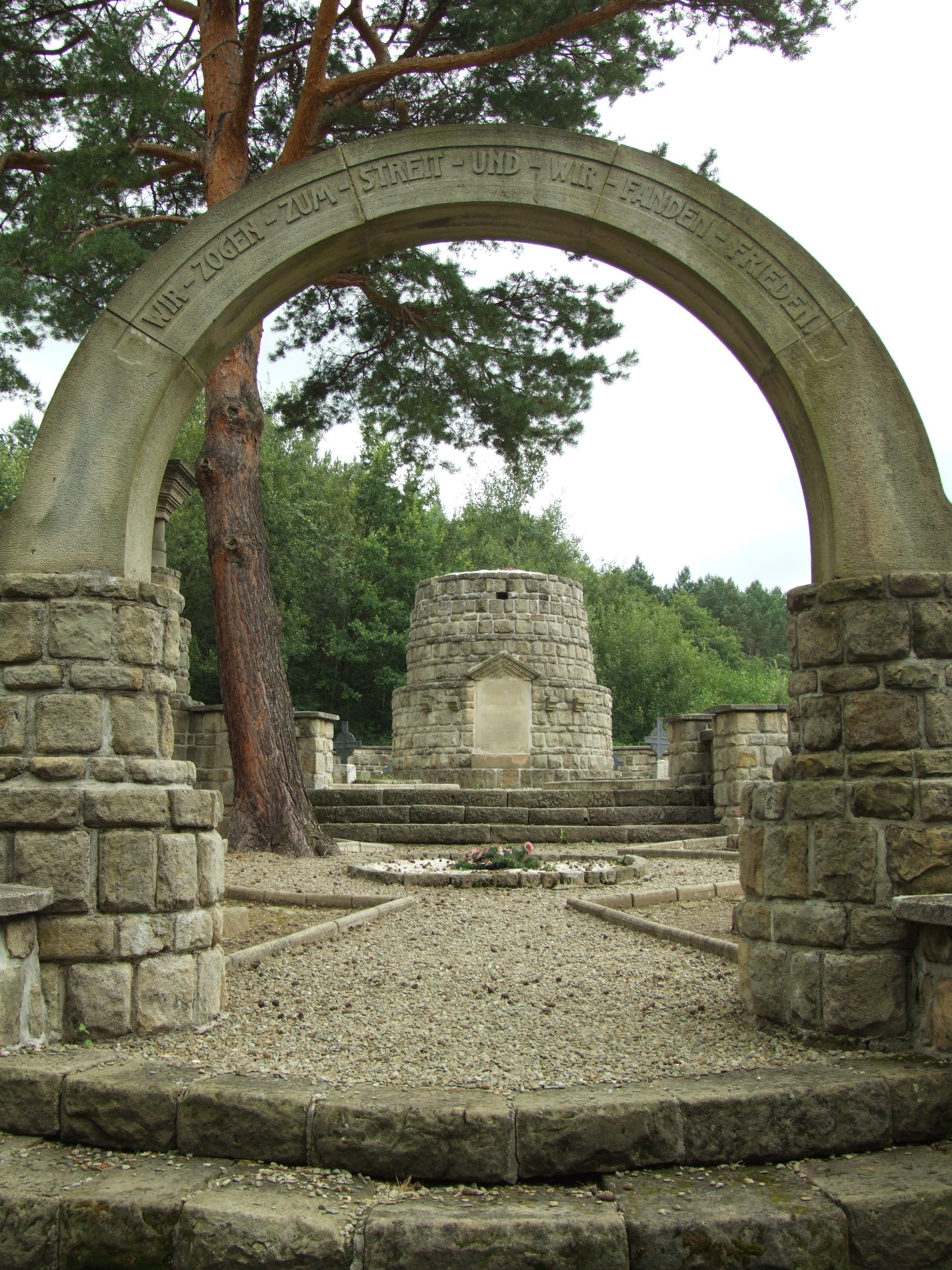
Cemetery No. 11 in Wola Cieklińska, Poland (1915)

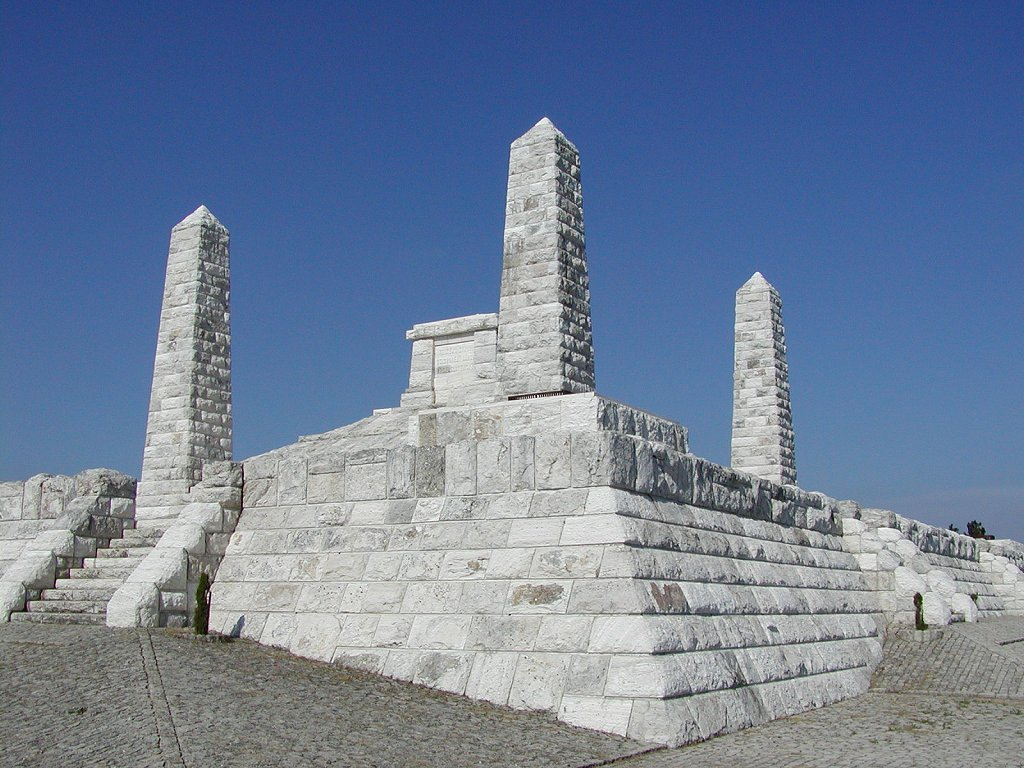
Tomb of Milan Rastislav Štefánik in Brezová pod Bradlom, Slovakia (1924–28)
