= Košariská =

- Municipality
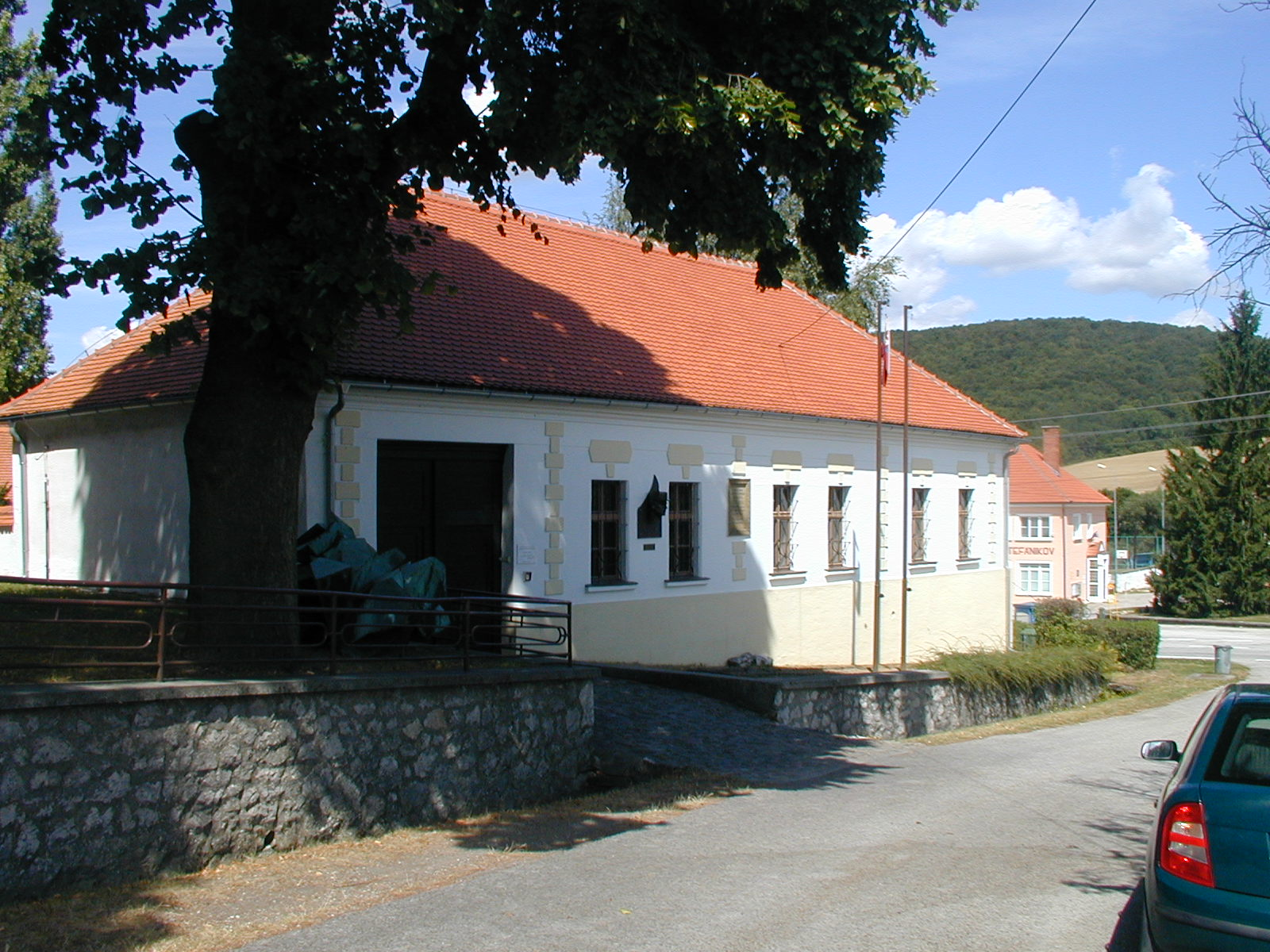

- Flag

- Location of Košariská in the Trenčín Region Location of Košariská in Slovakia
- Coordinates: 48.68°N 17.60°E
- Country: Slovakia
- Region: Trenčín Region
- District: Myjava District
- First mentioned: 1786

Area
  - Total: 11.53 km^{2} (4.45 sq mi)
- Elevation: 328 m (1,076 ft)

Population (2025)
  - Total: 415
- Time zone: UTC+1 (CET)
  - Summer (DST): UTC+2 (CEST)
- Postal code: 906 15
- Area code: +421 34
- Vehicle registration plate (until 2022): MY
- Website: www.kosariska.sk

Košariská (Slovak pronunciation: [ˈkɔʂariskaː]; Hungarian: Kosaras) is a village and municipality in Myjava District in the Trenčín Region of north-western Slovakia.

== History ==
In historical records the village was first mentioned in 1786. Before the establishment of independent Czechoslovakia in 1918, it was part of Nyitra County within the Kingdom of Hungary. From 1939 to 1945, it was part of the Slovak Republic.

== Geography ==
The municipality lies at an altitude of 328 metres (1,076 ft) and covers an area of 11.53 km^{2} (4.45 sq mi) (2025).

== Population ==
Population statistic (10 years)
Year	1995	2005	2015	2025
Count	429	404	434	415
Difference		−5.82%	+7.42%	−4.37%

Population statistic
Year	2024	2025
Count	416	415
Difference		−0.24%

It has a population of 415 people (31 December 2025).

=== Ethnicity ===
Census 2021 (1+ %)
Ethnicity	Number	Fraction
Slovak	406	97.83%
Czech	5	1.2%
Russian	5	1.2%
Not found out	5	1.2%
Total	415	

In year 2021 was 415 people by ethnicity 406 as Slovak, 5 as Czech, 5 as Russian, 5 as Not found out, 2 as Polish, 1 as Hungarian and 1 as Other.

Note on population: The difference values of population numbers in the table "Population statistic" and in the sections "Ethnicity" & "Religion" is caused by the use of various statistical methods.

=== Religion ===
Census 2021 (1+ %)
Religion	Number	Fraction
Evangelical Church	249	60%
None	104	25.06%
Roman Catholic Church	50	12.05%
Not found out	6	1.45%
Total	415	

In year 2021 was 415 people by religion 249 from Evangelical Church, 104 from None, 50 from Roman Catholic Church, 6 from Not found out, 4 from Ad hoc movements, 1 from Other and 1 from Buddhism.

== Famous people ==
- Milan Rastislav Štefánik, General, astronomer, and politician

== Genealogical resources ==
The records for genealogical research are available at the state archive "Statny Archiv in Bratislava, Slovakia"

- Roman Catholic church records (births/marriages/deaths): 1788-1910 (parish B)
- Lutheran church records (births/marriages/deaths): 1720-1952 (parish A)

== See also ==
- List of municipalities and towns in Slovakia
