= Moravské Lieskové =

- Municipality
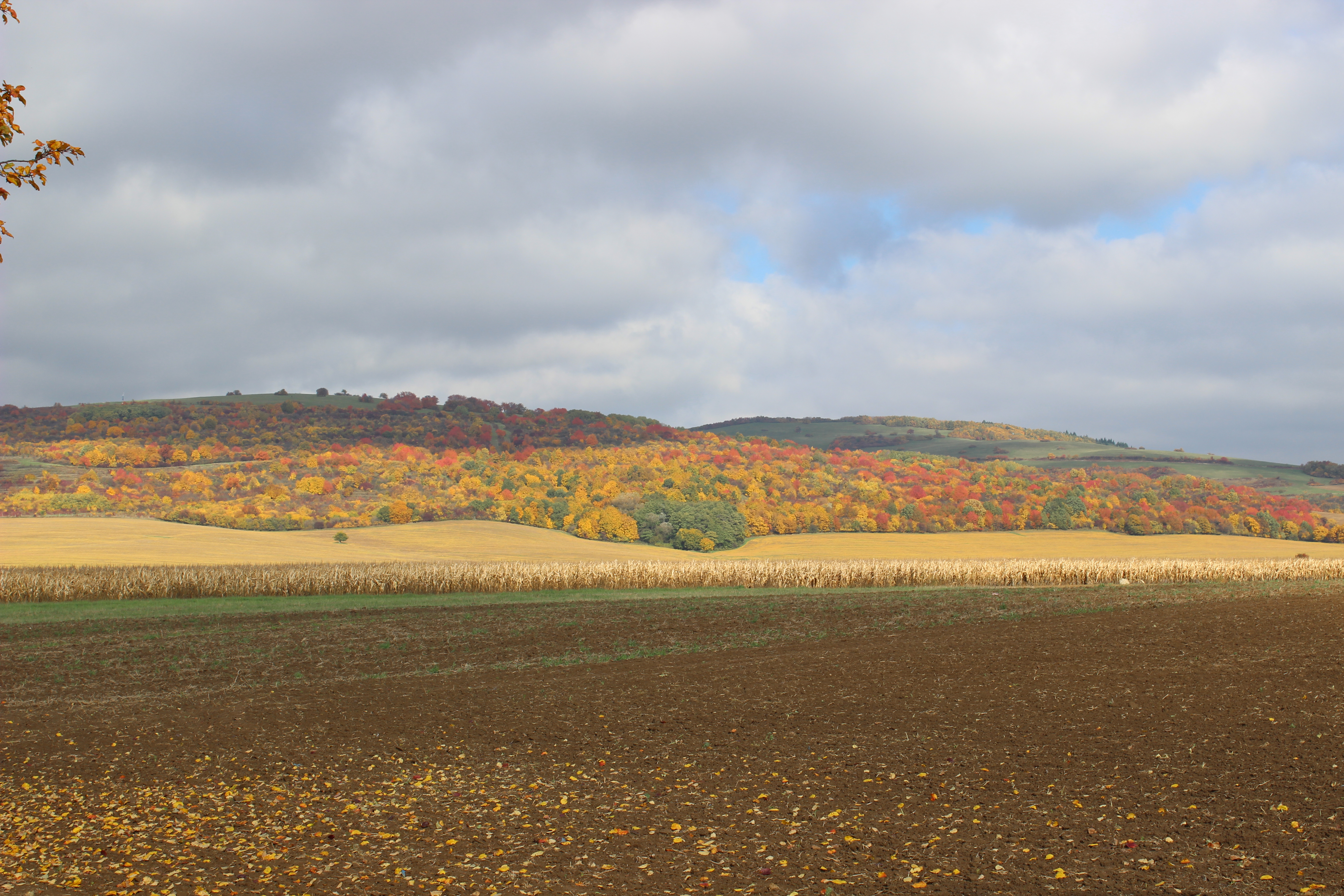

- Flag

- Location of Moravské Lieskové in the Trenčín Region Location of Moravské Lieskové in Slovakia
- Coordinates: 48.82°N 17.80°E
- Country: Slovakia
- Region: Trenčín Region
- District: Nové Mesto nad Váhom District
- First mentioned: 1398

Area
  - Total: 36.42 km^{2} (14.06 sq mi)
- Elevation: 301 m (988 ft)

Population (2025)
  - Total: 2,520
- Time zone: UTC+1 (CET)
  - Summer (DST): UTC+2 (CEST)
- Postal code: 916 42
- Area code: +421 32
- Vehicle registration plate (until 2022): NM
- Website: moravskelieskove.sk

Moravské Lieskové (Slovak pronunciation: [ˈmɔrawskeː ˈlɪeskɔʋeː]; Hungarian: Morvamogyoród) is a village and municipality in Nové Mesto nad Váhom District in the Trenčín Region of western Slovakia.

== History ==
In historical records the village was first mentioned in 1398. Before the establishment of independent Czechoslovakia in 1918, Moravské Lieskové was part of Trencsén County within the Kingdom of Hungary. From 1939 to 1945, it was part of the Slovak Republic.

== Geography ==
The municipality lies at an altitude of 301 metres (988 ft) and covers an area of 36.42 km^{2} (14.06 sq mi) (2025).

== Population ==
Population statistic (10 years)
Year	1995	2005	2015	2025
Count	2554	2507	2553	2520
Difference		−1.84%	+1.83%	−1.29%

Population statistic
Year	2024	2025
Count	2540	2520
Difference		−0.78%

It has a population of 2520 people (31 December 2025).

=== Ethnicity ===
Census 2021 (1+ %)
Ethnicity	Number	Fraction
Slovak	2439	96.06%
Not found out	72	2.83%
Czech	42	1.65%
Total	2539	

In year 2021 was 2539 people by ethnicity 2439 as Slovak, 72 as Not found out, 42 as Czech, 8 as Romani, 6 as Hungarian, 5 as Other, 4 as Romanian, 4 as German, 3 as Russian, 3 as Moravian, 2 as Ukrainian, 2 as Rusyn and 1 as Polish.

Note on population: The difference values of population numbers in the table "Population statistic" and in the sections "Ethnicity" & "Religion" is caused by the use of various statistical methods.

=== Religion ===
Census 2021 (1+ %)
Religion	Number	Fraction
Roman Catholic Church	900	35.45%
None	752	29.62%
Evangelical Church	709	27.92%
Not found out	97	3.82%
Total	2539	

In year 2021 was 2539 people by religion 900 from Roman Catholic Church, 752 from None, 709 from Evangelical Church, 97 from Not found out, 17 from Greek Catholic Church, 17 from Apostolic Church, 12 from Ad hoc movements, 8 from Other, 5 from Christian Congregations in Slovakia, 4 from United Methodist Church, 3 from Eastern Orthodox Church, 3 from Seventh-day Adventist Church, 3 from Buddhism, 2 from Calvinist Church, 2 from Baptists Church, 1 from Old Catholic Church, 1 from Paganism and natural spirituality, 1 from Other and not ascertained christian church, 1 from Jehovah's Witnesses and 1 from New Apostolic Church.
