= Bošáca =

- Municipality
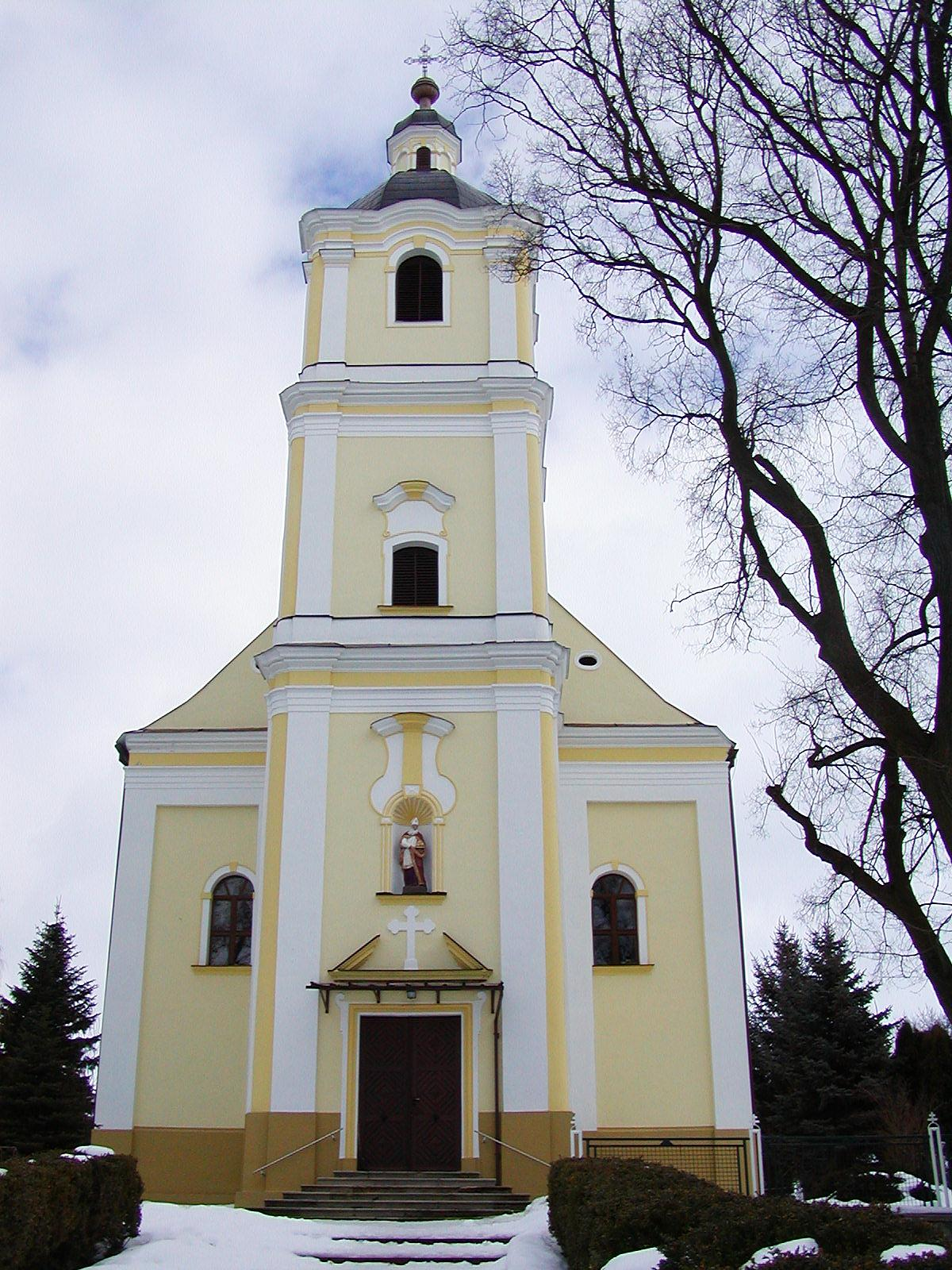

- Flag

- Location of Bošáca in the Trenčín Region Location of Bošáca in Slovakia
- Coordinates: 48.75°N 17.83°E
- Country: Slovakia
- Region: Trenčín Region
- District: Nové Mesto nad Váhom District
- First mentioned: 1380

Area
  - Total: 19.59 km^{2} (7.56 sq mi)
- Elevation: 330 m (1,080 ft)

Population (2025)
  - Total: 1,299
- Time zone: UTC+1 (CET)
  - Summer (DST): UTC+2 (CEST)
- Postal code: 913 07
- Area code: +421 32
- Vehicle registration plate (until 2022): NM
- Website: bosaca.sk

Bošáca (Hungarian: Bosác) is a village and municipality in Nové Mesto nad Váhom District in the Trenčín Region of western Slovakia.

== Etymology ==
The name is derived from an adjective bosý (in Slovak but also in some other Slavic languages - barefoot, bosáci - barefooted, poor people, hist. Bośáci > Bošáci).

== History ==
In historical records, the village was first mentioned in 1380 as Bosach. Before the establishment of independent Czechoslovakia in 1918, Bošáca was part of Trencsén County within the Kingdom of Hungary. From 1939 to 1945, it was part of the Slovak Republic.

== Geography ==
The municipality lies at an altitude of 330 metres (1,080 ft) and covers an area of 19.59 km^{2} (7.56 sq mi) (2025).

== Population ==
Population statistic (10 years)
Year	1995	2005	2015	2025
Count	1344	1342	1398	1299
Difference		−0.14%	+4.17%	−7.08%

Population statistic
Year	2024	2025
Count	1321	1299
Difference		−1.66%

It has a population of 1299 people (31 December 2025).

=== Ethnicity ===
Census 2021 (1+ %)
Ethnicity	Number	Fraction
Slovak	1308	96.17%
Not found out	42	3.08%
Czech	14	1.02%
Total	1360	

In year 2021 was 1360 people by ethnicity 1308 as Slovak, 42 as Not found out, 14 as Czech, 2 as Russian, 2 as Moravian, 2 as Other, 1 as Ukrainian, 1 as Romani, 1 as Rusyn and 1 as Hungarian.

Note on population: The difference values of population numbers in the table "Population statistic" and in the sections "Ethnicity" & "Religion" is caused by the use of various statistical methods.

=== Religion ===
Census 2021 (1+ %)
Religion	Number	Fraction
Roman Catholic Church	672	49.41%
Evangelical Church	353	25.96%
None	253	18.6%
Not found out	45	3.31%
Total	1360	

In year 2021 was 1360 people by religion 672 from Roman Catholic Church, 353 from Evangelical Church, 253 from None, 45 from Not found out, 11 from Ad hoc movements, 8 from Other, 4 from Other and not ascertained christian church, 4 from Buddhism, 3 from Eastern Orthodox Church, 2 from Greek Catholic Church, 2 from United Methodist Church, 1 from Calvinist Church, 1 from Paganism and natural spirituality and 1 from Church of the Brethren.

== Genealogical resources ==
The records for genealogical research are available at the state archive in Bratislava (Slovak: Štátny archív v Bratislave).

- Roman Catholic church records (births/marriages/deaths): 1691-1895 (parish A)
- Lutheran church records (births/marriages/deaths): 1784-1900 (parish B)

== See also ==
- List of municipalities and towns in Slovakia
