= Haluzice =

Haluzice may refer to places:

- Haluzice, Nové Mesto nad Váhom District, a municipality and village in Slovakia
- Haluzice (Zlín District), a municipality and village in the Czech Republic
