= Nové Mesto nad Váhom District =

Coordinates: 48°45′N 17°50′E

- District
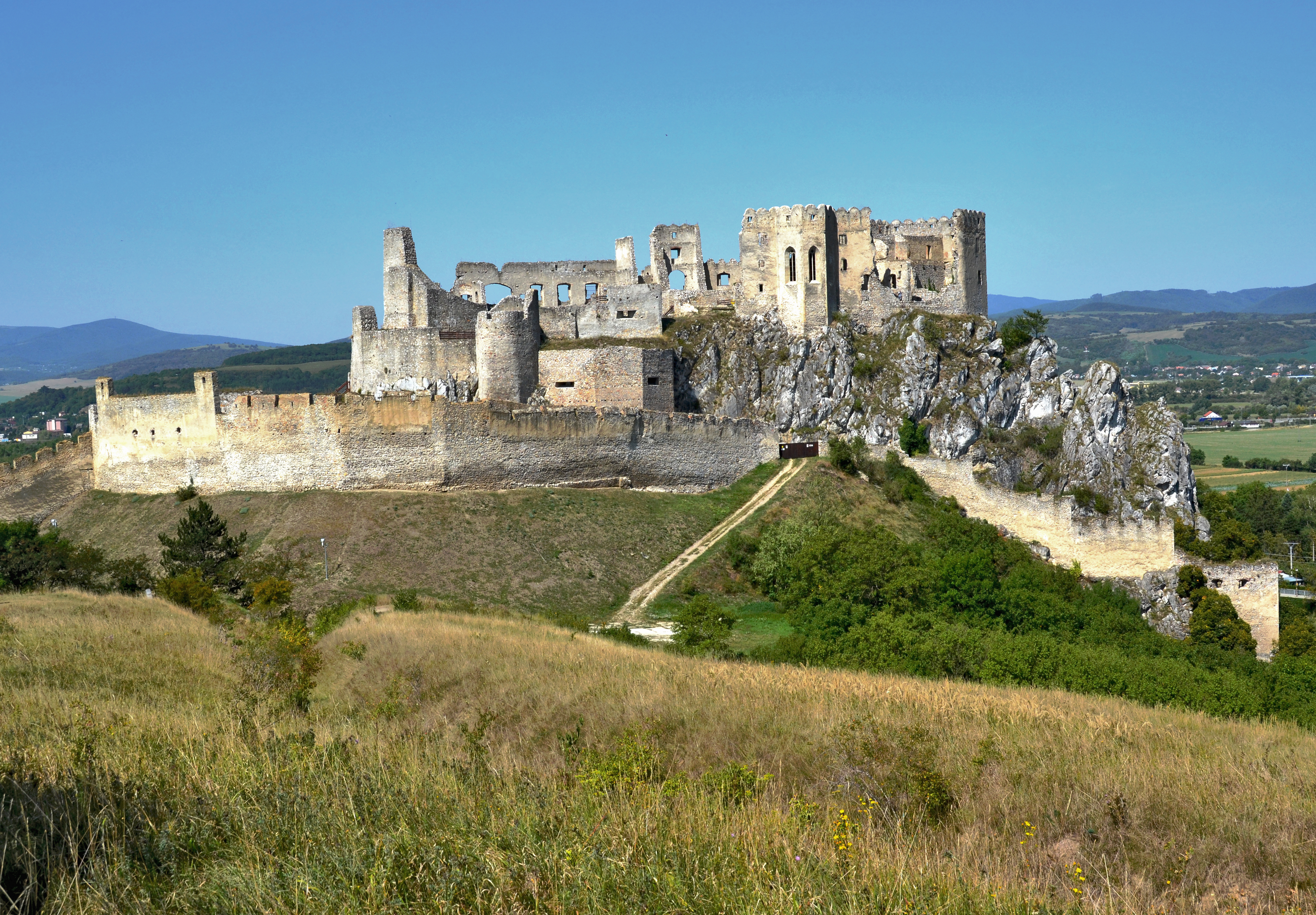
- Country: Slovakia
- Region (kraj): Trenčín Region
- Seat: Nové Mesto nad Váhom

Area
  - Total: 579.98 km^{2} (223.93 sq mi)

Population (2025)
  - Total: 61,105
- Time zone: UTC+1 (CET)
  - Summer (DST): UTC+2 (CEST)
- Telephone prefix: 032
- Vehicle registration plate (until 2022): NM
- Municipalities: 34

Nové Mesto nad Váhom District (Slovak: okres Nové Mesto nad Váhom, Hungarian: Vágújhelyi járás) is a district in the Trenčín Region of western Slovakia. Before 1920, the territory of the district was mostly part of the county of Kingdom of Hungary of Nyitra, with an area in the north forming part of the county of Trencsén.

== Population ==
Historical population
Year	Pop.	±%
1970	63,286	—
1980	64,701	+2.2%
1991	64,630	−0.1%
2001	63,530	−1.7%
2011	62,707	−1.3%
2021	61,840	−1.4%
Source: Censuses

Population statistic (10 years)
Year	1995	2005	2015	2025
Count	64,424	62,966	62,555	61,105
Difference		−2.26%	−0.65%	−2.31%

Population statistic
Year	2024	2025
Count	61,303	61,105
Difference		−0.32%

It has a population of 61,105 people (31 December 2025).

=== Ethnicity ===
Census 2021 (1+ %)
Ethnicity	Number	Fraction
Slovak	58,366	92.56%
Not found out	2782	4.41%
Czech	813	1.28%
Total	63,055	

In year 2021 was 63,055 people by ethnicity 58,366 as Slovak, 2782 as Not found out, 813 as Czech, 247 as Romani, 183 as Other, 112 as Hungarian, 72 as Russian, 61 as German, 52 as Ukrainian, 44 as Moravian, 43 as Rusyn, 37 as Polish, 36 as Bulgarian, 33 as Romanian, 24 as Italian, 23 as English, 21 as Croatian, 20 as Serbian, 17 as French, 16 as Vietnamese, 12 as Chinese, 8 as Jewish, 8 as Austrian, 8 as Canadian, 5 as Greek, 4 as Iranian, 3 as Irish, 2 as Turkish, 2 as Albanian and 1 as Silesian.

Note on population: The difference values of population numbers in the table "Population statistic" and in the sections "Ethnicity" & "Religion" is caused by the use of various statistical methods.

=== Religion ===
Census 2021 (1+ %)
Religion	Number	Fraction
Roman Catholic Church	28,435	45.98%
None	18,024	29.15%
Evangelical Church	10,234	16.55%
Not found out	3390	5.48%
Total	61,840	

In year 2021 was 61,840 people by religion 28,435 from Roman Catholic Church, 18,024 from None, 10,234 from Evangelical Church, 3390 from Not found out, 291 from Greek Catholic Church, 243 from Ad hoc movements, 175 from Other, 169 from Apostolic Church, 133 from Christian Congregations in Slovakia, 126 from Jehovah's Witnesses, 87 from Other and not ascertained christian church, 84 from Eastern Orthodox Church, 84 from Buddhism, 65 from Church of the Brethren, 64 from United Methodist Church, 52 from Paganism and natural spirituality, 51 from Seventh-day Adventist Church, 43 from Calvinist Church, 36 from Islam, 19 from Old Catholic Church, 12 from Hinduism, 7 from Jewish community, 5 from Czechoslovak Hussite Church, 5 from Baptists Church, 2 from New Apostolic Church, 2 from Church of Jesus Christ of Latter-day Saints and 2 from Bahá'i Community.

== Municipalities ==
The district has 34 municipalities:

Municipality	Area [km^{2}]	Population
Beckov	28.62	1,475
Bošáca	19.59	1,299
Brunovce	5.82	629
Bzince pod Javorinou	33.53	1,998
Čachtice	32.56	3,590
Častkovce	7.57	1,723
Dolné Srnie	8.78	983
Haluzice	3.84	91
Hôrka nad Váhom	18.31	782
Horná Streda	9.82	1,440
Hrádok	24.13	785
Hrachovište	9.20	632
Kálnica	26.40	999
Kočovce	15.31	1,873
Lubina	29.43	1,523
Lúka	17.40	750
Modrová	11.67	475
Modrovka	3.15	232
Moravské Lieskové	36.42	2,520
Nová Bošáca	33.43	980
Nová Lehota	18.21	187
Nová Ves nad Váhom	12.11	560
Nové Mesto nad Váhom	32.58	19,171
Očkov	4.94	490
Pobedim	8.60	1,129
Podolie	17.26	1,906
Potvorice	4.04	732
Považany	8.74	1,218
Stará Lehota	16.16	177
Stará Turá	50.94	8,167
Trenčianske Bohuslavice	6.40	903
Vaďovce	11.11	745
Višňové	5.51	158
Zemianske Podhradie	8.23	783

Population and area values are current for year 2025.
