= SFK Nová Ves nad Váhom =

Slovak football club

- Full name: Spoločný Futbalový Klub Nová Ves nad Váhom
- Founded: 2007
- Ground: Štadión SFK Nová Ves nad Váhom, Nová Ves nad Váhom
- Chairman: Pavel Pristaš
- Manager: Vladimír Cifranič
- League: Majstrovstvá regiónu
- 2010-11: Second (promoted from 4.liga west-north west)

SFK Nová Ves nad Váhom is a Slovak football team, based in the town of Nová Ves nad Váhom. The club was founded in 2007.

== Current squad ==
Note: Flags indicate national team as defined under FIFA eligibility rules; some limited exceptions apply. Players may hold more than one non-FIFA nationality.

No.	Pos.	Nation	Player
—	FW	(Brazil) BRA	Ademilson
