= Zemianske Podhradie =

- Municipality
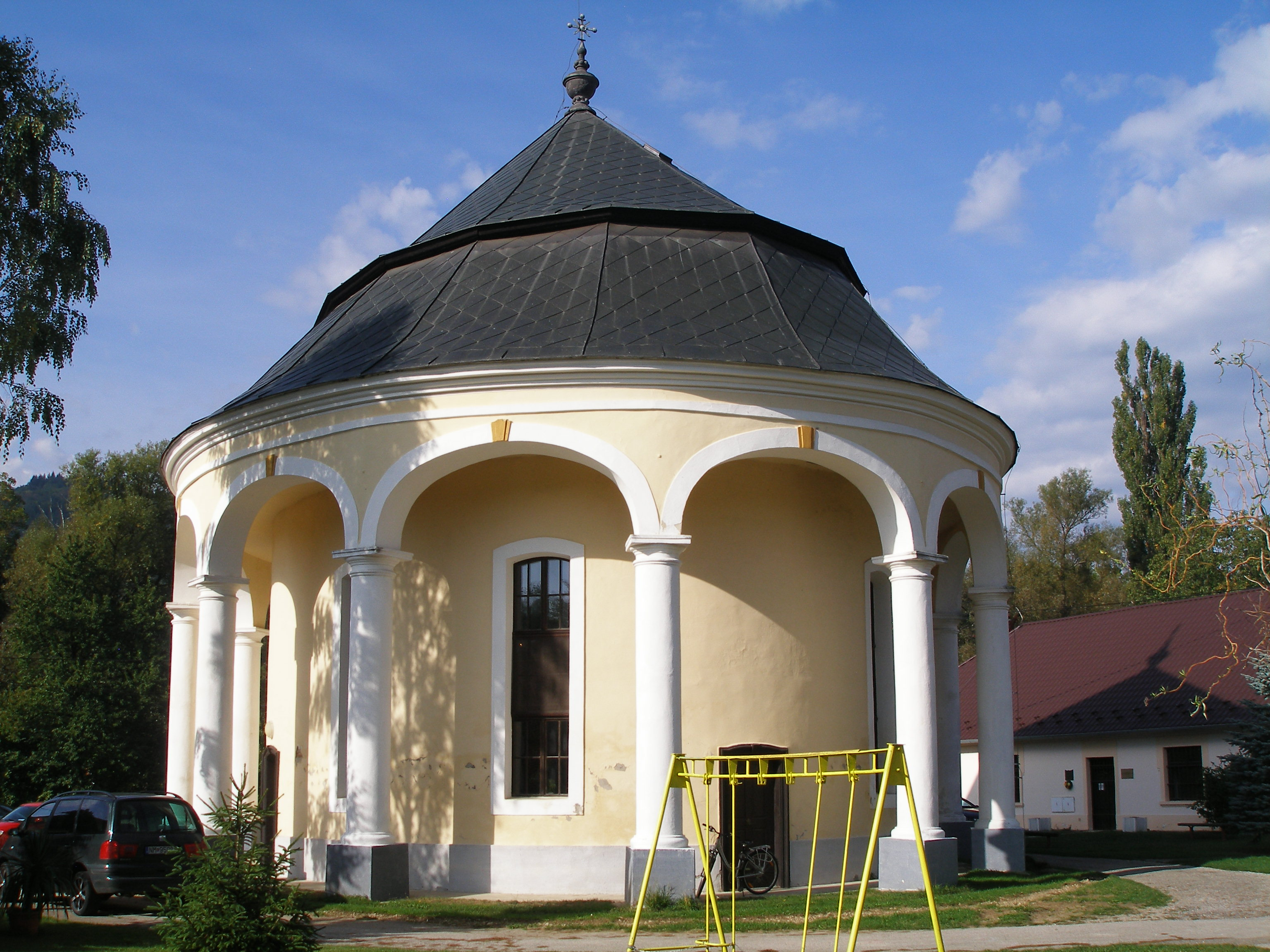
- Lutheran church

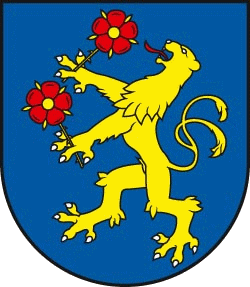
- Flag Coat of arms

- Location of Zemianske Podhradie in the Trenčín Region Location of Zemianske Podhradie in Slovakia
- Coordinates: 48.85°N 17.83°E
- Country: Slovakia
- Region: Trenčín Region
- District: Nové Mesto nad Váhom District
- First mentioned: 1397

Area
  - Total: 8.23 km^{2} (3.18 sq mi)
- Elevation: 244 m (801 ft)

Population (2025)
  - Total: 783
- Time zone: UTC+1 (CET)
  - Summer (DST): UTC+2 (CEST)
- Postal code: 913 07
- Area code: +421 32
- Vehicle registration plate (until 2022): NM
- Website: www.zemianske-podhradie.sk

Zemianske Podhradie (Hungarian: Nemesváralja) is a village and municipality in Nové Mesto nad Váhom District in the Trenčín Region of western Slovakia.

== History ==
In historical records the village was first mentioned in 1397. Before the establishment of independent Czechoslovakia in 1918, Zemianske Podhradie was part of Trencsén County within the Kingdom of Hungary. From 1939 to 1945, it was part of the Slovak Republic.

== Geography ==
The municipality lies at an altitude of 244 metres (801 ft) and covers an area of 8.23 km^{2} (3.18 sq mi) (2025).

== Population ==
Population statistic (10 years)
Year	1995	2005	2015	2025
Count	796	789	780	783
Difference		−0.87%	−1.14%	+0.38%

Population statistic
Year	2024	2025
Count	769	783
Difference		+1.82%

It has a population of 783 people (31 December 2025).

=== Ethnicity ===
Census 2021 (1+ %)
Ethnicity	Number	Fraction
Slovak	741	96.98%
Not found out	14	1.83%
Czech	11	1.43%
Total	764	

In year 2021 was 764 people by ethnicity 741 as Slovak, 14 as Not found out, 11 as Czech, 3 as Other, 1 as Ukrainian, 1 as Russian and 1 as German.

Note on population: The difference values of population numbers in the table "Population statistic" and in the sections "Ethnicity" & "Religion" is caused by the use of various statistical methods.

=== Religion ===
Census 2021 (1+ %)
Religion	Number	Fraction
Evangelical Church	313	40.97%
Roman Catholic Church	285	37.3%
None	142	18.59%
Not found out	18	2.36%
Total	764	

In year 2021 was 764 people by religion 313 from Evangelical Church, 285 from Roman Catholic Church, 142 from None, 18 from Not found out, 2 from Christian Congregations in Slovakia, 1 from Islam, 1 from United Methodist Church, 1 from Buddhism and 1 from Apostolic Church.
