= Trenčianske Bohuslavice =

- Municipality
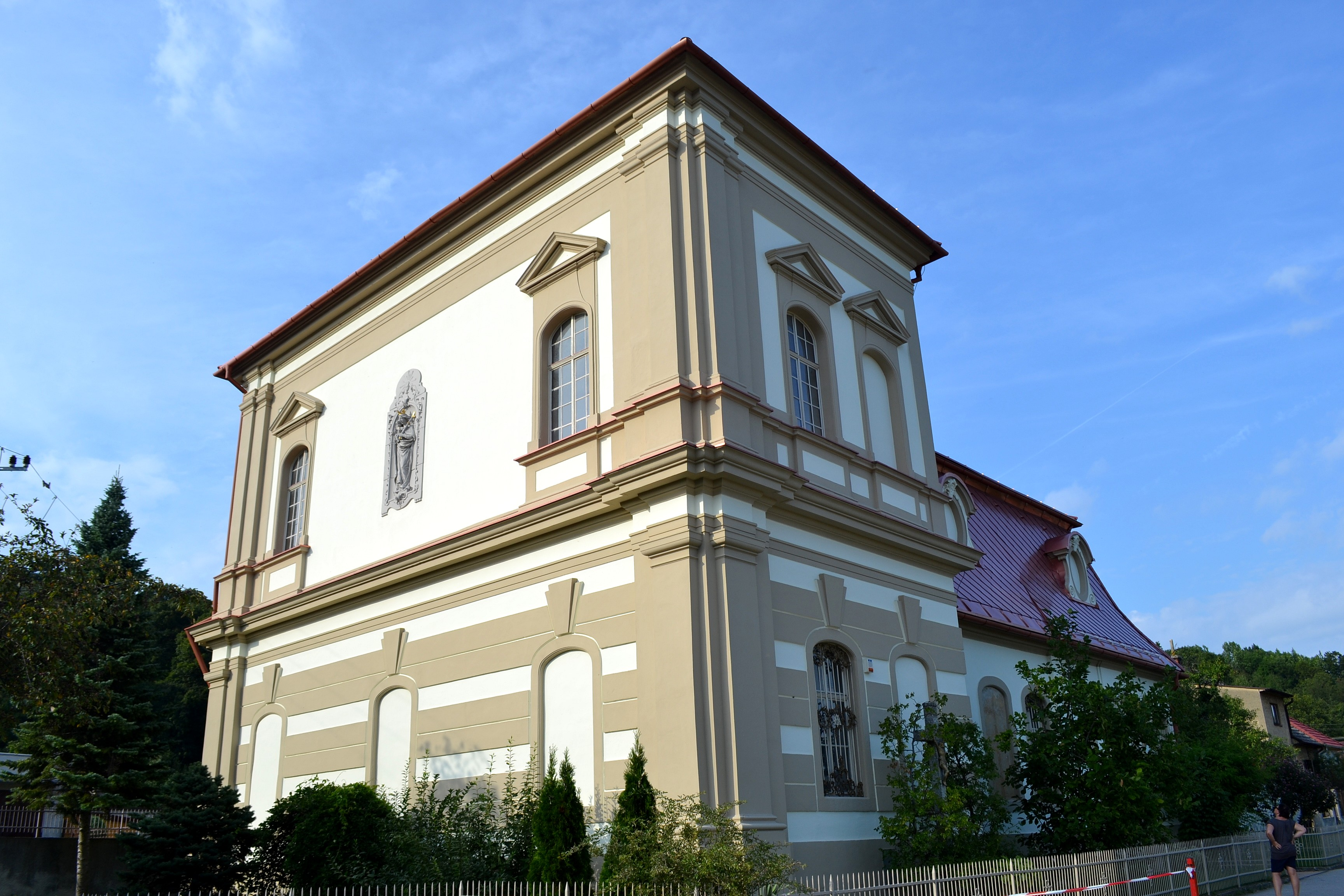
- Chapel of the Immaculate Conception

- Flag

- Location of Trenčianske Bohuslavice in the Trenčín Region Location of Trenčianske Bohuslavice in Slovakia
- Coordinates: 48.80°N 17.87°E
- Country: Slovakia
- Region: Trenčín Region
- District: Nové Mesto nad Váhom District
- First mentioned: 1208

Area
  - Total: 6.40 km^{2} (2.47 sq mi)
- Elevation: 196 m (643 ft)

Population (2025)
  - Total: 903
- Time zone: UTC+1 (CET)
  - Summer (DST): UTC+2 (CEST)
- Postal code: 913 06
- Area code: +421 32
- Vehicle registration plate (until 2022): NM
- Website: www.trencianskebohuslavice.sk

Trenčianske Bohuslavice (Slovak pronunciation: [ˈtrentʂɪɐnske ˈbɔɦuslaʋitse]; Hungarian: Bogoszló) is a village and municipality in Nové Mesto nad Váhom District in the Trenčín Region of western Slovakia.

== History ==
In historical records the village was first mentioned in 1208. Before the establishment of independent Czechoslovakia in 1918, Trenčianske Bohuslavice was part of Trencsén County within the Kingdom of Hungary. From 1939 to 1945, it was part of the Slovak Republic.

== Geography ==
The municipality lies at an altitude of 196 metres (643 ft) and covers an area of 6.40 km^{2} (2.47 sq mi) (2025).

== Population ==
Population statistic (10 years)
Year	1995	2005	2015	2025
Count	922	935	907	903
Difference		+1.40%	−2.99%	−0.44%

Population statistic
Year	2024	2025
Count	915	903
Difference		−1.31%

It has a population of 903 people (31 December 2025).

=== Ethnicity ===
Census 2021 (1+ %)
Ethnicity	Number	Fraction
Slovak	926	95.66%
Not found out	31	3.2%
Total	968	

In year 2021 was 968 people by ethnicity 926 as Slovak, 31 as Not found out, 7 as Czech, 2 as Ukrainian, 2 as Hungarian, 2 as Other, 2 as Croatian, 1 as Jewish, 1 as Russian, 1 as Romanian, 1 as Polish and 1 as Bulgarian.

Note on population: The difference values of population numbers in the table "Population statistic" and in the sections "Ethnicity" & "Religion" is caused by the use of various statistical methods.

=== Religion ===
Census 2021 (1+ %)
Religion	Number	Fraction
Roman Catholic Church	671	69.32%
None	166	17.15%
Evangelical Church	80	8.26%
Not found out	33	3.41%
Total	968	

In year 2021 was 968 people by religion 671 from Roman Catholic Church, 166 from None, 80 from Evangelical Church, 33 from Not found out, 4 from Greek Catholic Church, 3 from Other, 3 from Buddhism, 2 from Calvinist Church, 2 from Christian Congregations in Slovakia, 2 from Ad hoc movements, 1 from Eastern Orthodox Church and 1 from Jehovah's Witnesses.
