= Dolné Srnie =

- Municipality
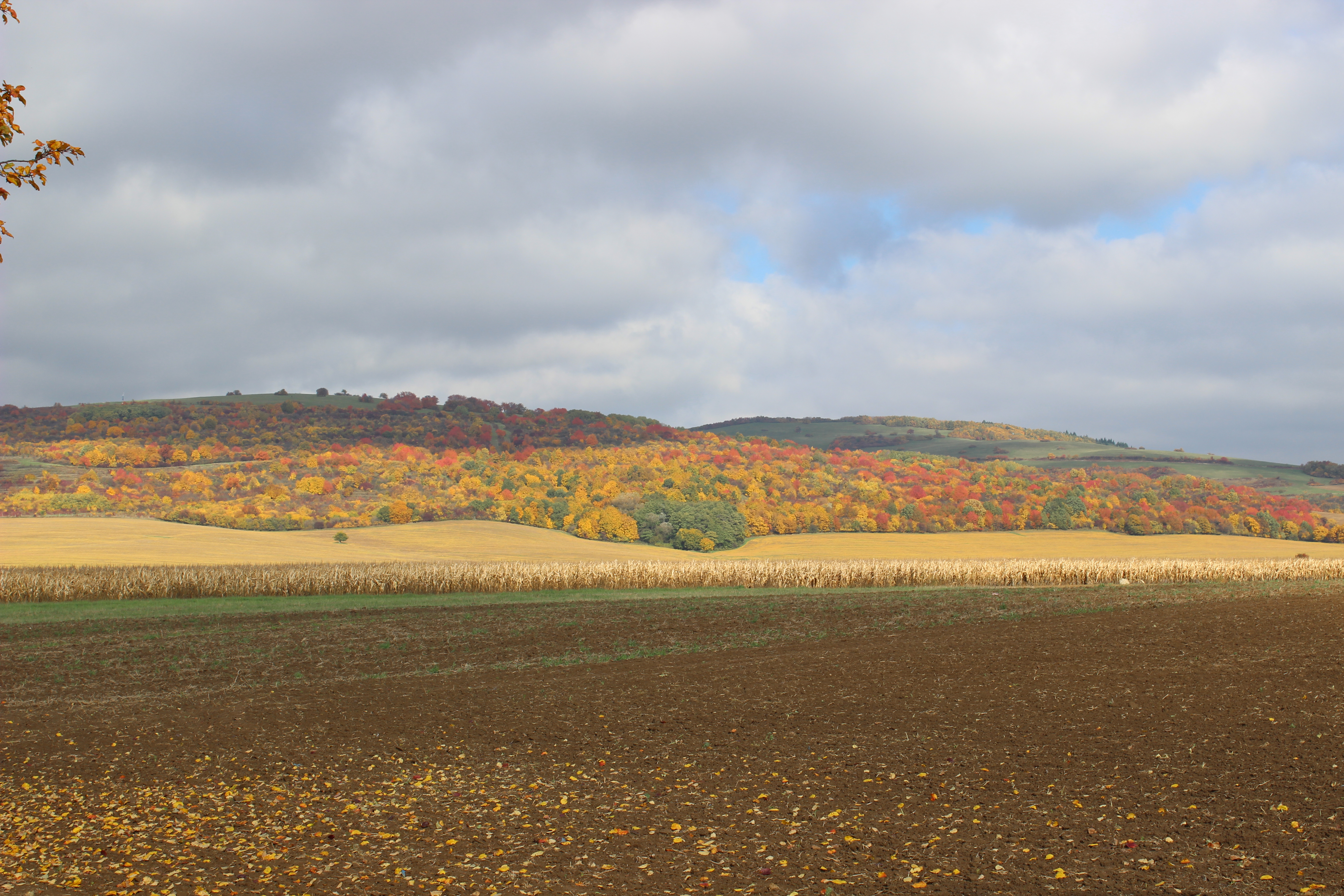

- Flag

- Location of Dolné Srnie in the Trenčín Region Location of Dolné Srnie in Slovakia
- Coordinates: 48.80°N 17.82°E
- Country: Slovakia
- Region: Trenčín Region
- District: Nové Mesto nad Váhom District
- First mentioned: 1477

Area
  - Total: 8.78 km^{2} (3.39 sq mi)
- Elevation: 222 m (728 ft)

Population (2025)
  - Total: 983
- Time zone: UTC+1 (CET)
  - Summer (DST): UTC+2 (CEST)
- Postal code: 916 41
- Area code: +421 32
- Vehicle registration plate (until 2022): NM
- Website: www.dolnesrnie.sk

Dolné Srnie (Hungarian: Alsószernye) is a village and municipality in Nové Mesto nad Váhom District in the Trenčín Region of western Slovakia.

== History ==
In historical records the village was first mentioned in 1477. Before the establishment of independent Czechoslovakia in 1918, Dolné Srnie was part of Trencsén County within the Kingdom of Hungary. From 1939 to 1945, it was part of the Slovak Republic.

== Geography ==
The municipality lies at an altitude of 222 metres (728 ft) and covers an area of 8.78 km^{2} (3.39 sq mi) (2025).

== Population ==
Population statistic (10 years)
Year	1995	2005	2015	2025
Count	819	933	989	983
Difference		+13.91%	+6.00%	−0.60%

Population statistic
Year	2024	2025
Count	984	983
Difference		−0.10%

It has a population of 983 people (31 December 2025).

=== Ethnicity ===
Census 2021 (1+ %)
Ethnicity	Number	Fraction
Slovak	944	95.16%
Not found out	40	4.03%
Czech	14	1.41%
Total	992	

In year 2021 was 992 people by ethnicity 944 as Slovak, 40 as Not found out, 14 as Czech, 2 as Ukrainian, 1 as Romanian, 1 as Moravian, 1 as Hungarian and 1 as Bulgarian.

Note on population: The difference values of population numbers in the table "Population statistic" and in the sections "Ethnicity" & "Religion" is caused by the use of various statistical methods.

=== Religion ===
Census 2021 (1+ %)
Religion	Number	Fraction
None	362	36.49%
Evangelical Church	302	30.44%
Roman Catholic Church	243	24.5%
Not found out	55	5.54%
Greek Catholic Church	11	1.11%
Total	992	

In year 2021 was 992 people by religion 362 from None, 302 from Evangelical Church, 243 from Roman Catholic Church, 55 from Not found out, 11 from Greek Catholic Church, 5 from Apostolic Church, 3 from Ad hoc movements, 2 from Old Catholic Church, 2 from Eastern Orthodox Church, 2 from Christian Congregations in Slovakia, 2 from United Methodist Church, 1 from Other and not ascertained christian church, 1 from Other and 1 from Buddhism.

== Genealogical resources ==
The records for genealogical research are available at the state archive "Statny Archiv in Bratislava, Slovakia"

== See also ==
- List of municipalities and towns in Slovakia
