= Stará Lehota =

- Municipality
- Flag

- Location of Stará Lehota in the Trenčín Region Location of Stará Lehota in Slovakia
- Coordinates: 48.65°N 17.95°E
- Country: Slovakia
- Region: Trenčín Region
- District: Nové Mesto nad Váhom District
- First mentioned: 1348

Area
  - Total: 16.16 km^{2} (6.24 sq mi)
- Elevation: 337 m (1,106 ft)

Population (2025)
  - Total: 177
- Time zone: UTC+1 (CET)
  - Summer (DST): UTC+2 (CEST)
- Postal code: 916 35
- Area code: +421 33
- Vehicle registration plate (until 2022): NM
- Website: staralehota.sk

Stará Lehota (Hungarian: Szentmiklósvölgye) is a village and municipality in Nové Mesto nad Váhom District in the Trenčín Region of western Slovakia.

== History ==
In historical records the village was first mentioned in 1348. Before the establishment of independent Czechoslovakia in 1918, Stará Lehota was part of Nyitra County within the Kingdom of Hungary. From 1939 to 1945, it was part of the Slovak Republic.

== Geography ==
The municipality lies at an altitude of 337 metres (1,106 ft) and covers an area of 16.16 km^{2} (6.24 sq mi) (2025).

== Population ==
Population statistic (10 years)
Year	1995	2005	2015	2025
Count	299	262	205	177
Difference		−12.37%	−21.75%	−13.65%

Population statistic
Year	2024	2025
Count	176	177
Difference		+0.56%

It has a population of 177 people (31 December 2025).

=== Ethnicity ===
Census 2021 (1+ %)
Ethnicity	Number	Fraction
Slovak	167	95.42%
Czech	3	1.71%
Romanian	2	1.14%
Not found out	2	1.14%
Total	175	

In year 2021 was 175 people by ethnicity 167 as Slovak, 3 as Czech, 2 as Romanian, 2 as Not found out, 1 as Romani, 1 as Hungarian and 1 as Other.

Note on population: The difference values of population numbers in the table "Population statistic" and in the sections "Ethnicity" & "Religion" is caused by the use of various statistical methods.

=== Religion ===
Census 2021 (1+ %)
Religion	Number	Fraction
Roman Catholic Church	147	84%
None	20	11.43%
Not found out	4	2.29%
Evangelical Church	2	1.14%
Total	175	

In year 2021 was 175 people by religion 147 from Roman Catholic Church, 20 from None, 4 from Not found out, 2 from Evangelical Church, 1 from Eastern Orthodox Church and 1 from Greek Catholic Church.
