= Pobedim =

- Municipality
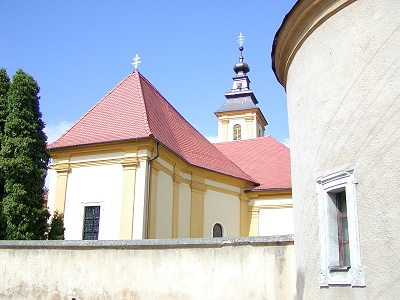
- Saint Michael's church, Pobedim

- Flag

- Location of Pobedim in the Trenčín Region Location of Pobedim in Slovakia
- Coordinates: 48.65°N 17.80°E
- Country: Slovakia
- Region: Trenčín Region
- District: Nové Mesto nad Váhom District
- First mentioned: 1392

Area
  - Total: 8.60 km^{2} (3.32 sq mi)
- Elevation: 167 m (548 ft)

Population (2025)
  - Total: 1,129
- Time zone: UTC+1 (CET)
  - Summer (DST): UTC+2 (CEST)
- Postal code: 916 23
- Area code: +421 32
- Vehicle registration plate (until 2022): NM
- Website: pobedim.sk

Pobedim (Hungarian: Pobedény) is a village and municipality in Nové Mesto nad Váhom District in the Trenčín Region of western Slovakia. A Slavic hill fort from the pre-Great Moravian period has been uncovered in the locality Hradištia. The hill fort belongs to Early Medieval sites with the highest number of artifacts found in Slovakia.

== Geography ==
The municipality lies at an altitude of 167 metres (548 ft) and covers an area of 8.60 km^{2} (3.32 sq mi) (2025).

== History ==
The village was first mentioned in 1392, but the area was occasionally inhabited from the Late Stone Age. The settlement is documented also from the Early Bronze Age and especially in the Late Bronze Age. The people of Lusatian culture built their settlement in the local swamps and left numerous artifacts (cultic artifacts, metallurgical tools, fragments of bronze, ceramics, etc.). The area was then settled by the Celts. In the Roman period, it was more or less uninhabited and only one finding is known from the Migration period.

The locality had been intensively colonized by the Slavs at the end of the 5th and in the 6th century (localities Horné Pole and Dolné Pole). The Slavic hill fort was built at the end of the 8th century and was destroyed for the first time at the end of the first third the 9th century. The destruction of the hill fort is usually associated with the unification of the Principality of Nitra and the Principality of Moravia (the attack of Mojmír's army or Pribina's attack preceding his expulsion, depending on principality to which is Pobedim attributed; neither destruction during other internal conflict related to integration processes of the Slavs cannot be excluded). Radiocarbon dating indices that construction activities were realized also in the turnover of the 9th/10th century.

The hill fort consists of two parts, probably not built at once. The whole hill fort was protected by 3 meters high wall with a palisade on top and external ditch. An archaeological research uncovered 114 graves from the Early Middle Ages, residential buildings, outbuildings, workshops and in particular, one of the largest collection of ceramics from the 9th century in Slovakia. Twenty large metal depots contained hundreds of old Slavic hrivnas (semifinished iron products), tools, stirrups, keys and further artifacts. Weapons except axes are nearly missing what led to a hypothesis that the depots were hidden before an external attack and weapons were left for defense.

Nowadays, the area of the hill fort is a part of an agricultural field. The findings can be seen in the local museum in Pobedim.

Before the establishment of independent Czechoslovakia in 1918, Pobedim was part of Nyitra County within the Kingdom of Hungary. From 1939 to 1945, it was part of the Slovak Republic.

== Population ==
Population statistic (10 years)
Year	1995	2005	2015	2025
Count	1240	1205	1147	1129
Difference		−2.82%	−4.81%	−1.56%

Population statistic
Year	2024	2025
Count	1111	1129
Difference		+1.62%

It has a population of 1129 people (31 December 2025).

=== Ethnicity ===
Census 2021 (1+%)
Ethnicity	Number	Fraction
Slovak	1107	95.59%
Not found out	46	3.97%
Total	1158	

In year 2021 was 1158 people by ethnicity 1107 as Slovak, 46 as Not found out, 9 as Romani, 8 as Czech, 2 as Ukrainian, 2 as Other, 1 as Rusyn and 1 as Russian.

Note on population: The difference values of population numbers in the table "Population statistic" and in the sections "Ethnicity" & "Religion" is caused by the use of various statistical methods.

=== Religion ===
Census 2021 (1+%)
Religion	Number	Fraction
Roman Catholic Church	889	76.77%
None	156	13.47%
Not found out	60	5.18%
Evangelical Church	25	2.16%
Total	1158	

In year 2021 was 1158 people by religion 889 from Roman Catholic Church, 156 from None, 60 from Not found out, 25 from Evangelical Church, 9 from Christian Congregations in Slovakia, 8 from Greek Catholic Church, 7 from Calvinist Church, 2 from Other and 2 from Ad hoc movements.

== Sources ==
- Turčan, Vladimír (2012). Veľkomoravské hradiská [The Great Moravian Castles] (in Slovak). Bratislava: Dajama. ISBN 978-80-8136-013-8.
