= Vaďovce =

- Municipality
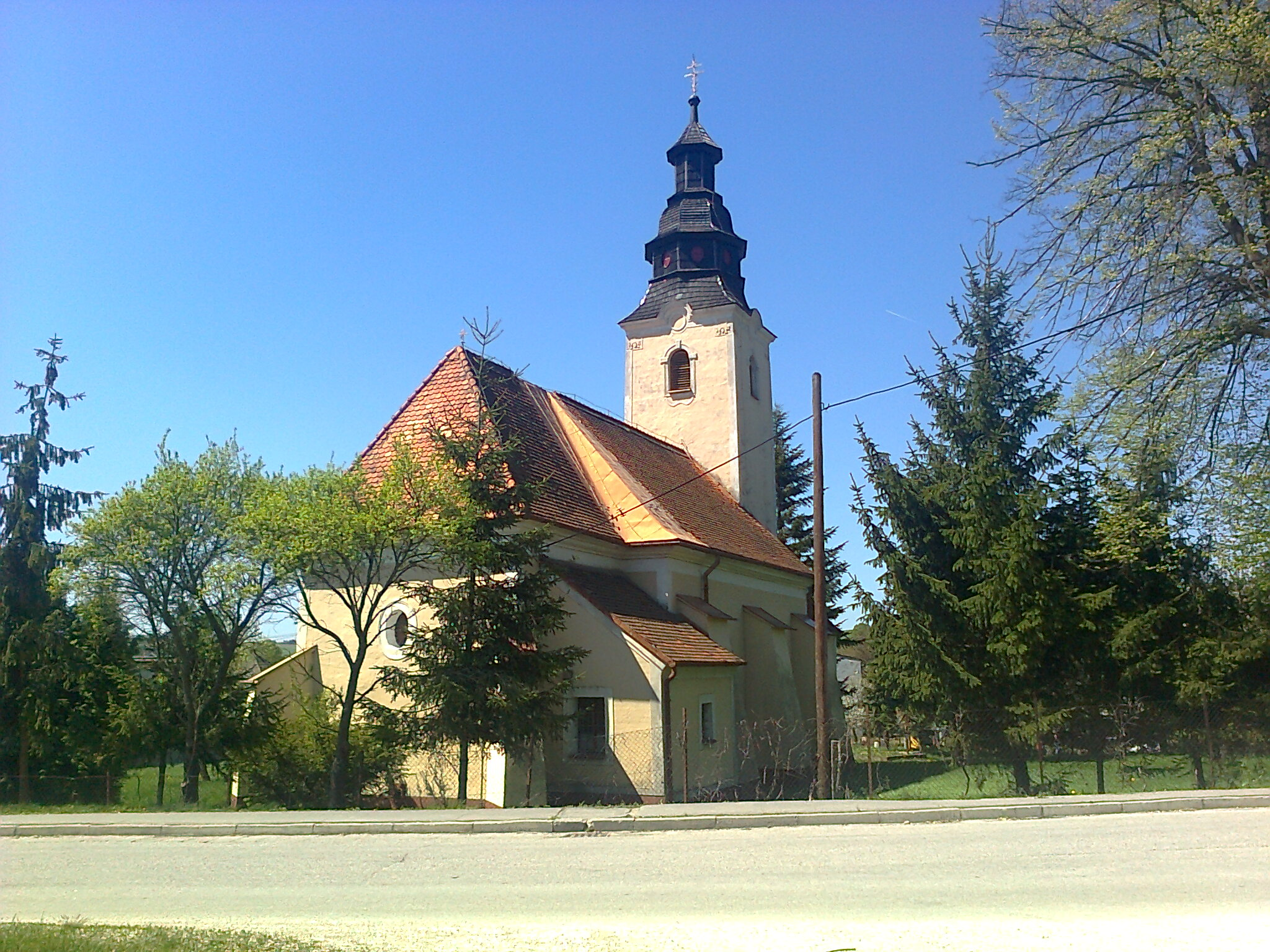
- Church of Saint Michael

- Flag

- Location of Vaďovce in the Trenčín Region Location of Vaďovce in Slovakia
- Coordinates: 48.73°N 17.73°E
- Country: Slovakia
- Region: Trenčín Region
- District: Nové Mesto nad Váhom District
- First mentioned: 1419

Area
  - Total: 11.11 km^{2} (4.29 sq mi)
- Elevation: 230 m (750 ft)

Population (2025)
  - Total: 745
- Time zone: UTC+1 (CET)
  - Summer (DST): UTC+2 (CEST)
- Postal code: 916 13
- Area code: +421 32
- Vehicle registration plate (until 2022): NM
- Website: www.vadovce.sk

Vaďovce (Slovak pronunciation: [ˈʋaɟɔwtse]; Hungarian: Vagyóc) is a village and municipality in Nové Mesto nad Váhom District in the Trenčín Region of western Slovakia between Biele and Male Karpaty.

== History ==
In historical records the village was first mentioned in 1392. Before the establishment of independent Czechoslovakia in 1918, Vaďovce was part of Nyitra County within the Kingdom of Hungary. From 1939 to 1945, it was part of the Slovak Republic.

Vaďovce has been a holiday centre for many years. There is an old church with ancient ornaments on the walls. Overall, Vaďovce has been not been well known but in recent years awareness has grown.

The current mayor of Vaďovce is Alžbeta Tuková.

== Geography ==
The municipality lies at an altitude of 230 metres (750 ft) and covers an area of 11.11 km^{2} (4.29 sq mi) (2025).

== Population ==
Population statistic (10 years)
Year	1995	2005	2015	2025
Count	691	706	755	745
Difference		+2.17%	+6.94%	−1.32%

Population statistic
Year	2024	2025
Count	743	745
Difference		+0.26%

It has a population of 745 people (31 December 2025).

=== Ethnicity ===
Census 2021 (1+ %)
Ethnicity	Number	Fraction
Slovak	678	95.09%
Not found out	26	3.64%
Total	713	

In year 2021 was 713 people by ethnicity 678 as Slovak, 26 as Not found out, 4 as Czech, 4 as Polish, 2 as Italian, 2 as Romani, 2 as Croatian, 1 as Moravian and 1 as Other.

Note on population: The difference values of population numbers in the table "Population statistic" and in the sections "Ethnicity" & "Religion" is caused by the use of various statistical methods.

=== Religion ===
Census 2021 (1+ %)
Religion	Number	Fraction
None	273	38.29%
Evangelical Church	209	29.31%
Roman Catholic Church	180	25.25%
Not found out	25	3.51%
Seventh-day Adventist Church	12	1.68%
Total	713	

In year 2021 was 713 people by religion 273 from None, 209 from Evangelical Church, 180 from Roman Catholic Church, 25 from Not found out, 12 from Seventh-day Adventist Church, 3 from Jehovah's Witnesses, 3 from Ad hoc movements, 2 from Other, 2 from Greek Catholic Church, 1 from Calvinist Church, 1 from Eastern Orthodox Church, 1 from Paganism and natural spirituality and 1 from Other and not ascertained christian church.
