= Nová Lehota =

- Municipality
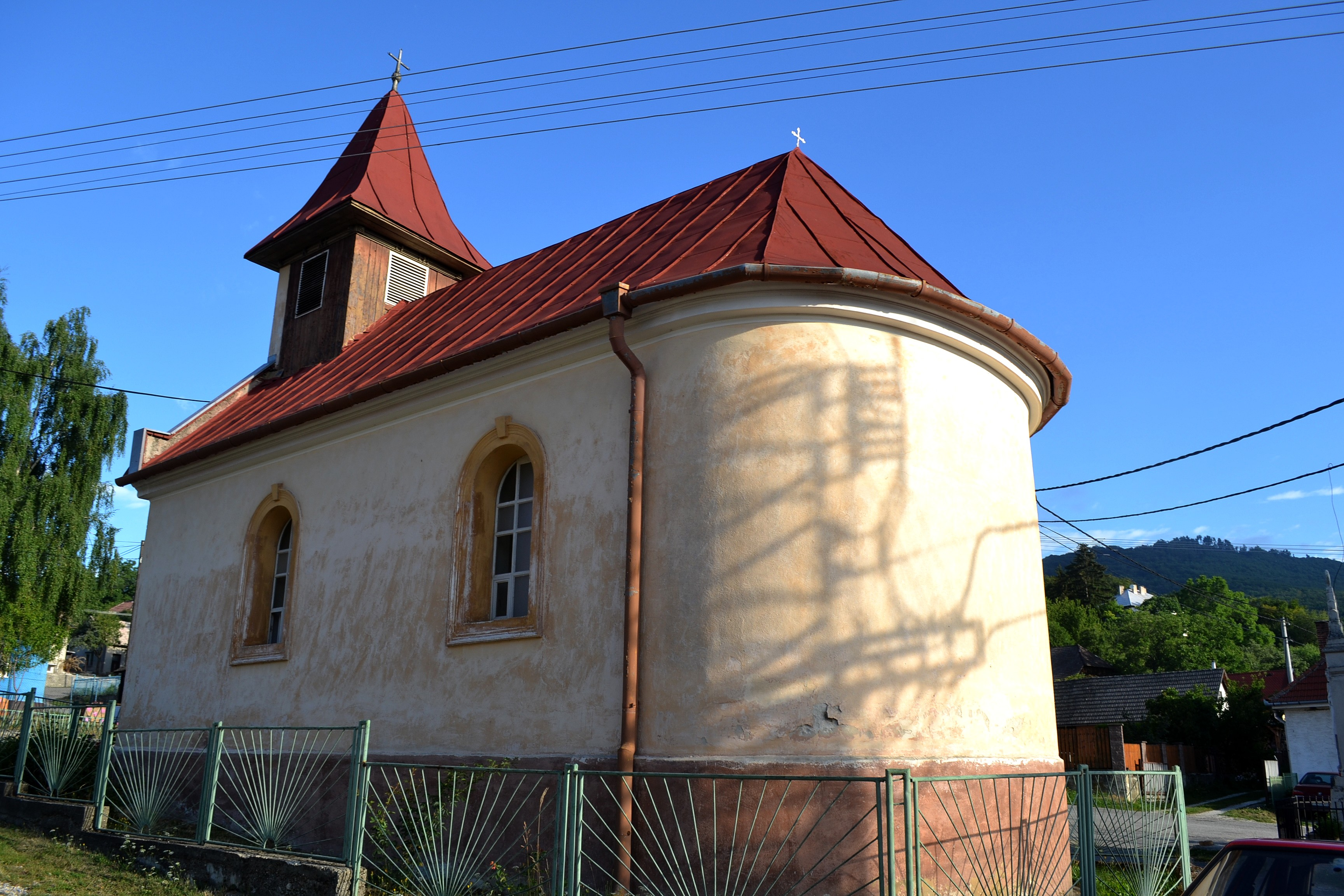

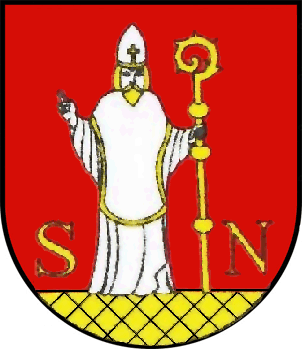
- Flag Coat of arms

- Location of Nová Lehota in the Trenčín Region Location of Nová Lehota in Slovakia
- Coordinates: 48.66°N 17.98°E
- Country: Slovakia
- Region: Trenčín Region
- District: Nové Mesto nad Váhom District
- First mentioned: 1543

Area
  - Total: 18.21 km^{2} (7.03 sq mi)
- Elevation: 428 m (1,404 ft)

Population (2025)
  - Total: 187
- Time zone: UTC+1 (CET)
  - Summer (DST): UTC+2 (CEST)
- Postal code: 916 35
- Area code: +421 33
- Vehicle registration plate (until 2022): NM
- Website: www.novalehota.sk

Nová Lehota (German: Neuhau, Hungarian: Újszabadi) is a village in Nové Mesto nad Váhom District in the Trenčín Region of western Slovakia.

== History ==
In historical records, the village was first mentioned in 1487. Historically, the village belongs to the Hauerland region in the Carpathian Mountains. The origins of the German settlement go as far as the 13th century when the necessity of colonization of regions devastated by the Mongolian invasion of 1240–1241 arose. During the late 13th century, there were many German habitats founded in the region by diverse German nationalities. The foundation of Neuhau is not primarily connected to the colonization after the Mongol invasion. It is being dated somehow later, maybe even more than hundred years later. It is also generally suggested that the first inhabitants of the place situated in the valley halfway from Handlová to Žiar nad Hronom in a rather hilly surrounding were actually Slavs. Supposedly there has been as much as 3 manors of the primary settlements of Slavs latter to become extinct and fully replaced by Germans from either Handlová or Janova Lehota. Before the establishment of independent Czechoslovakia in 1918, Nová Lehota was part of Nyitra County within the Kingdom of Hungary. From 1939 to 1945, it was part of the Slovak Republic. In 1945, the village had a population of approximately 1400 inhabitants, nearly all of them Germans. They were almost completely expelled and relocated to Germany in 1946.

== Geography ==
The municipality lies at an altitude of 428 metres (1,404 ft) and covers an area of 18.21 km^{2} (7.03 sq mi) (2025).

== Population ==
Population statistic (10 years)
Year	1995	2005	2015	2025
Count	272	228	193	187
Difference		−16.17%	−15.35%	−3.10%

Population statistic
Year	2024	2025
Count	192	187
Difference		−2.60%

It has a population of 187 people (31 December 2025).

=== Ethnicity ===
Census 2021 (1+ %)
Ethnicity	Number	Fraction
Slovak	200	96.61%
Czech	6	2.89%
Not found out	5	2.41%
Russian	3	1.44%
Total	207	

In year 2021 was 207 people by ethnicity 200 as Slovak, 6 as Czech, 5 as Not found out, 3 as Russian, 1 as Ukrainian, 1 as Romani, 1 as Rusyn and 1 as Polish.

Note on population: The difference values of population numbers in the table "Population statistic" and in the sections "Ethnicity" & "Religion" is caused by the use of various statistical methods.

=== Religion ===
Census 2021 (1+ %)
Religion	Number	Fraction
Roman Catholic Church	108	52.17%
Evangelical Church	59	28.5%
None	31	14.98%
Not found out	5	2.42%
Total	207	

In year 2021 was 207 people by religion 108 from Roman Catholic Church, 59 from Evangelical Church, 31 from None, 5 from Not found out, 2 from Other, 1 from Greek Catholic Church and 1 from Apostolic Church.
