= Modrová =

- Municipality
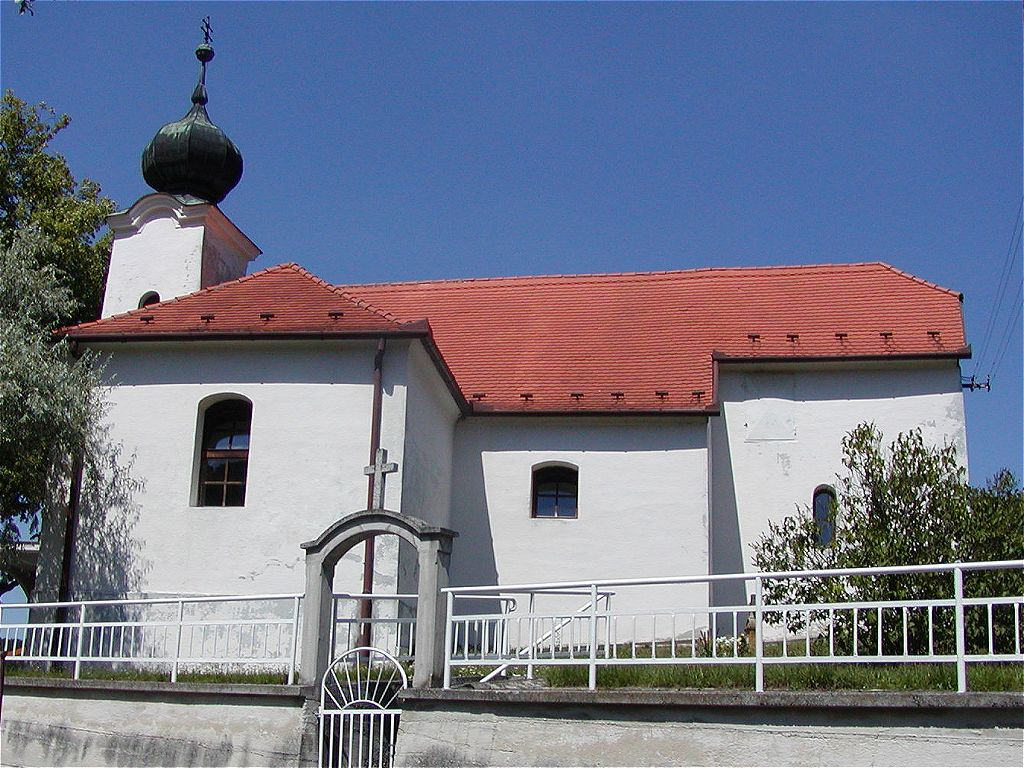
- St. Michael the Archangel's Church

- Flag

- Location of Modrová in the Trenčín Region Location of Modrová in Slovakia
- Coordinates: 48.63°N 17.90°E
- Country: Slovakia
- Region: Trenčín Region
- District: Nové Mesto nad Váhom District
- First mentioned: 1348

Area
  - Total: 11.67 km^{2} (4.51 sq mi)
- Elevation: 199 m (653 ft)

Population (2025)
  - Total: 475
- Time zone: UTC+1 (CET)
  - Summer (DST): UTC+2 (CEST)
- Postal code: 916 35
- Area code: +421 33
- Vehicle registration plate (until 2022): NM
- Website: www.modrova.eu.sk

Modrová (Hungarian: Nagymodró) is a village and municipality in Nové Mesto nad Váhom District in the Trenčín Region of western Slovakia.

== History ==
In historical records the village was first mentioned in 1348. Before the establishment of independent Czechoslovakia in 1918, Modrová was part of Nyitra County within the Kingdom of Hungary. From 1939 to 1945, it was part of the Slovak Republic.

== Geography ==
The municipality lies at an altitude of 199 metres (653 ft) and covers an area of 11.67 km^{2} (4.51 sq mi) (2025).

== Population ==
Population statistic (10 years)
Year	1995	2005	2015	2025
Count	507	499	515	475
Difference		−1.57%	+3.20%	−7.76%

Population statistic
Year	2024	2025
Count	472	475
Difference		+0.63%

It has a population of 475 people (31 December 2025).

=== Ethnicity ===
Census 2021 (1+ %)
Ethnicity	Number	Fraction
Slovak	464	97.47%
Not found out	7	1.47%
Total	476	

In year 2021 was 476 people by ethnicity 464 as Slovak, 7 as Not found out, 4 as Czech, 4 as Romani, 3 as German, 2 as Hungarian and 1 as Other.

Note on population: The difference values of population numbers in the table "Population statistic" and in the sections "Ethnicity" & "Religion" is caused by the use of various statistical methods.

=== Religion ===
Census 2021 (1+ %)
Religion	Number	Fraction
Roman Catholic Church	399	83.82%
None	47	9.87%
Evangelical Church	8	1.68%
Not found out	6	1.26%
Christian Congregations in Slovakia	5	1.05%
Other	5	1.05%
Apostolic Church	5	1.05%
Total	476	

In year 2021 was 476 people by religion 399 from Roman Catholic Church, 47 from None, 8 from Evangelical Church, 6 from Not found out, 5 from Christian Congregations in Slovakia, 5 from Other, 5 from Apostolic Church and 1 from Greek Catholic Church.
