= Hôrka nad Váhom =

- Municipality
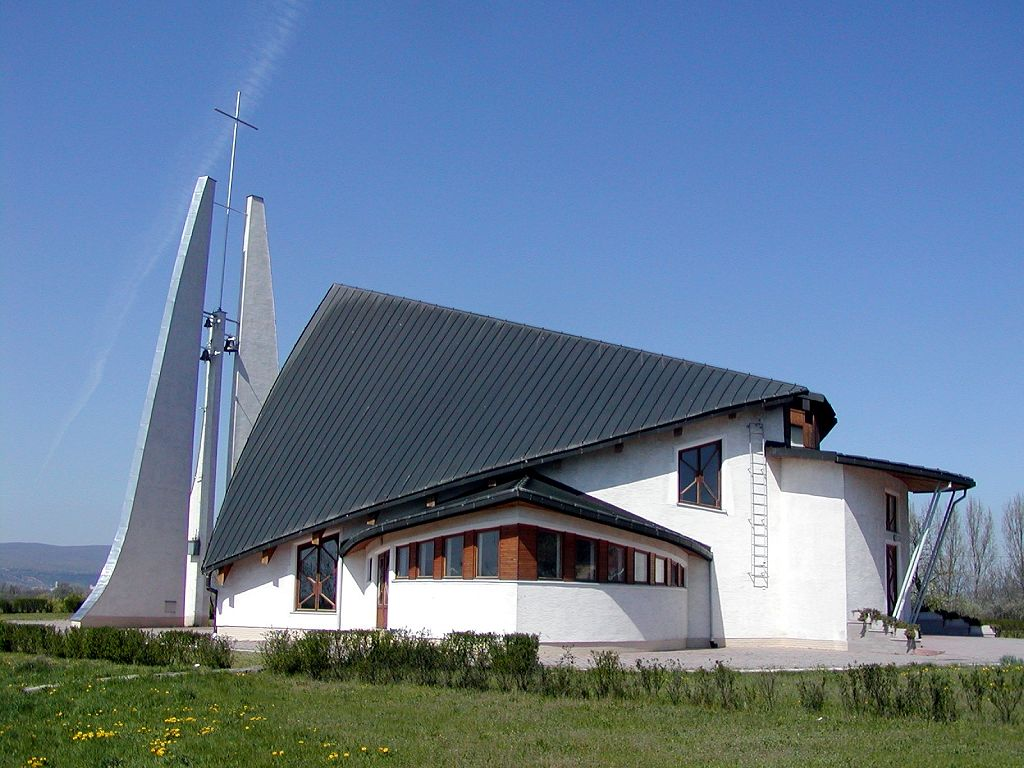

- Flag

- Location of Hôrka nad Váhom in the Trenčín Region Location of Hôrka nad Váhom in Slovakia
- Coordinates: 48.72°N 17.88°E
- Country: Slovakia
- Region: Trenčín Region
- District: Nové Mesto nad Váhom District
- First mentioned: 1426

Area
  - Total: 18.31 km^{2} (7.07 sq mi)
- Elevation: 197 m (646 ft)

Population (2025)
  - Total: 782
- Time zone: UTC+1 (CET)
  - Summer (DST): UTC+2 (CEST)
- Postal code: 916 32
- Area code: +421 32
- Vehicle registration plate (until 2022): NM
- Website: horkanadvahom.sk

Hôrka nad Váhom (Hungarian: Vághorka) is a village and municipality in Nové Mesto nad Váhom District in the Trenčín Region of western Slovakia.

== History ==
In historical records the village was first mentioned in 1426. Before the establishment of independent Czechoslovakia in 1918, Hôrka nad Váhom was part of Nyitra County within the Kingdom of Hungary. From 1939 to 1945, it was part of the Slovak Republic.

== Geography ==
The municipality lies at an altitude of 197 metres (646 ft) and covers an area of 18.31 km^{2} (7.07 sq mi) (2025).

== Population ==
Population statistic (10 years)
Year	1995	2005	2015	2025
Count	711	682	748	782
Difference		−4.07%	+9.67%	+4.54%

Population statistic
Year	2024	2025
Count	789	782
Difference		−0.88%

It has a population of 782 people (31 December 2025).

=== Ethnicity ===
Census 2021 (1+ %)
Ethnicity	Number	Fraction
Slovak	757	97.8%
Not found out	14	1.8%
Total	774	

In year 2021 was 774 people by ethnicity 757 as Slovak, 14 as Not found out, 6 as Czech, 2 as Russian, 2 as Other, 2 as English, 1 as German and 1 as Hungarian.

Note on population: The difference values of population numbers in the table "Population statistic" and in the sections "Ethnicity" & "Religion" is caused by the use of various statistical methods.

=== Religion ===
Census 2021 (1+ %)
Religion	Number	Fraction
Roman Catholic Church	523	67.57%
None	185	23.9%
Evangelical Church	31	4.01%
Not found out	19	2.45%
Total	774	

In year 2021 was 774 people by religion 523 from Roman Catholic Church, 185 from None, 31 from Evangelical Church, 19 from Not found out, 5 from Apostolic Church, 5 from Ad hoc movements, 3 from Greek Catholic Church, 2 from Christian Congregations in Slovakia and 1 from Other.

== Genealogical resources ==
The records for genealogical research are available at the state archive "Statny Archiv in Bratislava, Slovakia"

- Roman Catholic church records (births/marriages/deaths): 1719-1907 (parish B)
- Lutheran church records (births/marriages/deaths): 1811-1942 (parish B)

== See also ==
- List of municipalities and towns in Slovakia
