= Višňové, Nové Mesto nad Váhom District =

Višňové
- Municipality
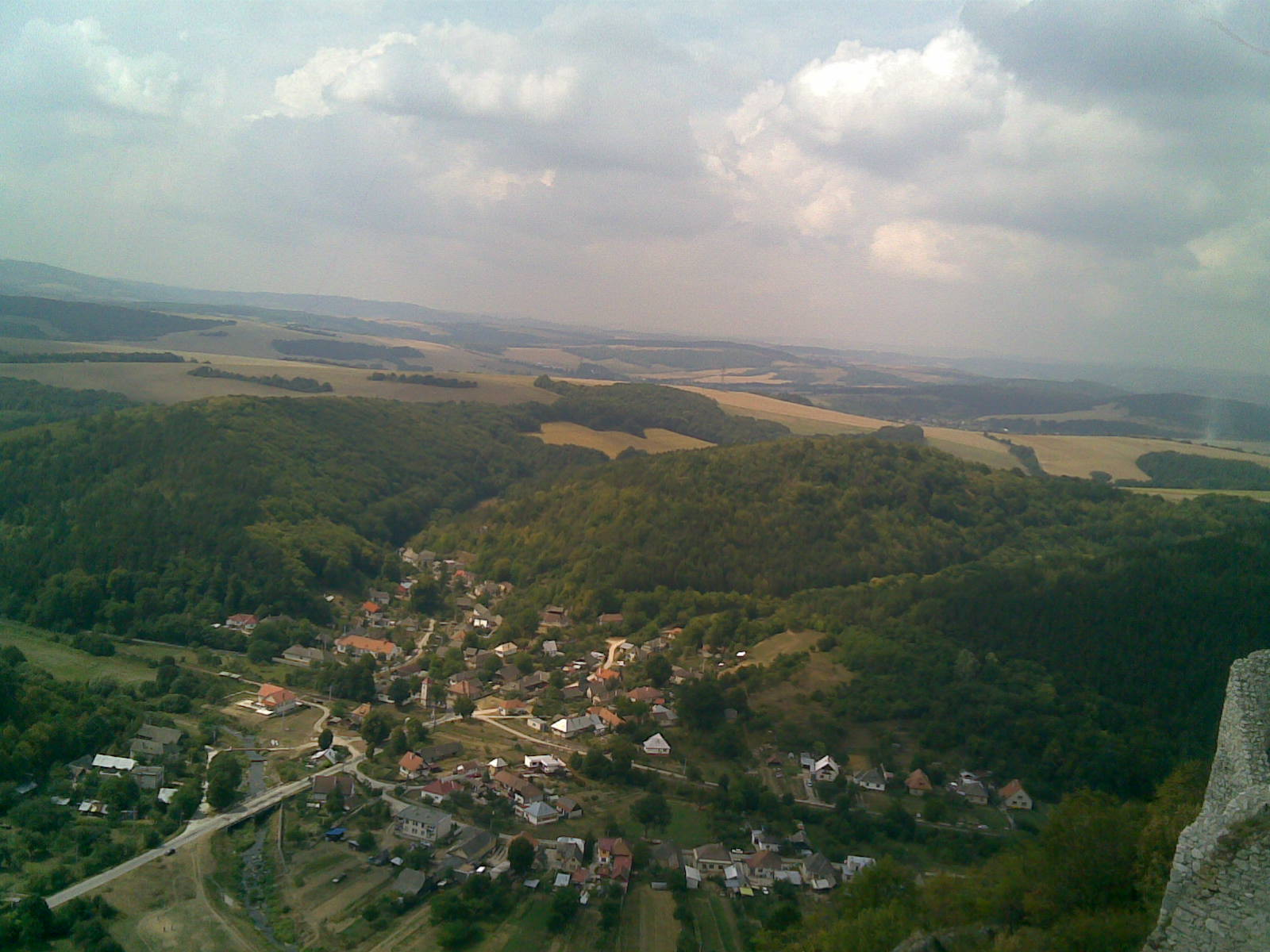

- Location of Višňové in the Trenčín Region Location of Višňové in Slovakia
- Coordinates: 48°43′32″N 17°45′10″E
- Country: Slovakia
- Region: Trenčín Region
- District: Nové Mesto nad Váhom District
- First mentioned: 1392

Area
  - Total: 5.51 km^{2} (2.13 sq mi)
- Elevation: 208 m (682 ft)

Population (2025)
  - Total: 158
- Time zone: UTC+1 (CET)
  - Summer (DST): UTC+2 (CEST)
- Postal code: 916 15
- Area code: +421 32
- Vehicle registration plate (until 2022): NM
- Website: obecvisnove.sk

Višňové (Hungarian: Alsóvisnyó) is a village and municipality in Nové Mesto nad Váhom District in the Trenčín Region of western Slovakia.

== History ==
In historical records the village was first mentioned in 1392. Before the establishment of independent Czechoslovakia in 1918, Višňové was part of Nyitra County within the Kingdom of Hungary. From 1939 to 1945, it was part of the Slovak Republic.

== Geography ==
The municipality lies at an altitude of 208 metres (682 ft) and covers an area of 5.51 km^{2} (2.13 sq mi) (2025).

== Population ==
Population statistic (10 years)
Year	1995	2005	2015	2025
Count	202	190	179	158
Difference		−5.94%	−5.78%	−11.73%

Population statistic
Year	2024	2025
Count	161	158
Difference		−1.86%

It has a population of 158 people (31 December 2025).

=== Ethnicity ===
Census 2021 (1+ %)
Ethnicity	Number	Fraction
Slovak	167	97.66%
Not found out	3	1.75%
Romani	2	1.16%
Total	171	

In year 2021 was 171 people by ethnicity 167 as Slovak, 3 as Not found out, 2 as Romani and 1 as Czech.

Note on population: The difference values of population numbers in the table "Population statistic" and in the sections "Ethnicity" & "Religion" is caused by the use of various statistical methods.

=== Religion ===
Census 2021 (1+ %)
Religion	Number	Fraction
Evangelical Church	80	46.78%
None	54	31.58%
Roman Catholic Church	23	13.45%
Not found out	5	2.92%
Paganism and natural spirituality	4	2.34%
Ad hoc movements	2	1.17%
Total	171	

In year 2021 was 171 people by religion 80 from Evangelical Church, 54 from None, 23 from Roman Catholic Church, 5 from Not found out, 4 from Paganism and natural spirituality, 2 from Ad hoc movements, 1 from Eastern Orthodox Church, 1 from Other and not ascertained christian church and 1 from Greek Catholic Church.
