= Modrovka =

- Municipality
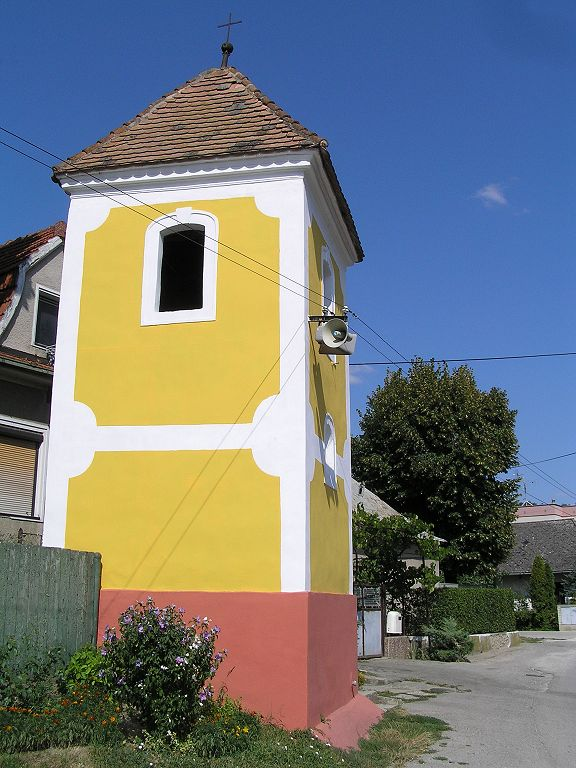

- Flag

- Location of Modrovka in the Trenčín Region Location of Modrovka in Slovakia
- Coordinates: 48.65°N 17.88°E
- Country: Slovakia
- Region: Trenčín Region
- District: Nové Mesto nad Váhom District
- First mentioned: 1348

Area
  - Total: 3.15 km^{2} (1.22 sq mi)
- Elevation: 171 m (561 ft)

Population (2025)
  - Total: 232
- Time zone: UTC+1 (CET)
  - Summer (DST): UTC+2 (CEST)
- Postal code: 916 35
- Area code: +421 33
- Vehicle registration plate (until 2022): NM
- Website: www.modrovka.sk

Modrovka (Hungarian: Kismodró) is a village and municipality in Nové Mesto nad Váhom District in the Trenčín Region of western Slovakia.

== History ==
In historical records the village was first mentioned in 1380. Before the establishment of independent Czechoslovakia in 1918, Modrovka was part of Nyitra County within the Kingdom of Hungary. From 1939 to 1945, it was part of the Slovak Republic.

== Geography ==
The municipality lies at an altitude of 171 metres (561 ft) and covers an area of 3.15 km^{2} (1.22 sq mi) (2025).

== Population ==
Population statistic (10 years)
Year	1995	2005	2015	2025
Count	239	225	195	232
Difference		−5.85%	−13.33%	+18.97%

Population statistic
Year	2024	2025
Count	228	232
Difference		+1.75%

It has a population of 232 people (31 December 2025).

=== Ethnicity ===
Census 2021 (1+ %)
Ethnicity	Number	Fraction
Slovak	198	97.53%
Not found out	4	1.97%
Total	203	

In year 2021 was 203 people by ethnicity 198 as Slovak, 4 as Not found out and 1 as Ukrainian.

Note on population: The difference values of population numbers in the table "Population statistic" and in the sections "Ethnicity" & "Religion" is caused by the use of various statistical methods.

=== Religion ===
Census 2021 (1+ %)
Religion	Number	Fraction
Roman Catholic Church	91	44.83%
Evangelical Church	66	32.51%
None	39	19.21%
Not found out	6	2.96%
Total	203	

In year 2021 was 203 people by religion 91 from Roman Catholic Church, 66 from Evangelical Church, 39 from None, 6 from Not found out and 1 from Eastern Orthodox Church.
