= Nová Ves nad Váhom =

- Municipality
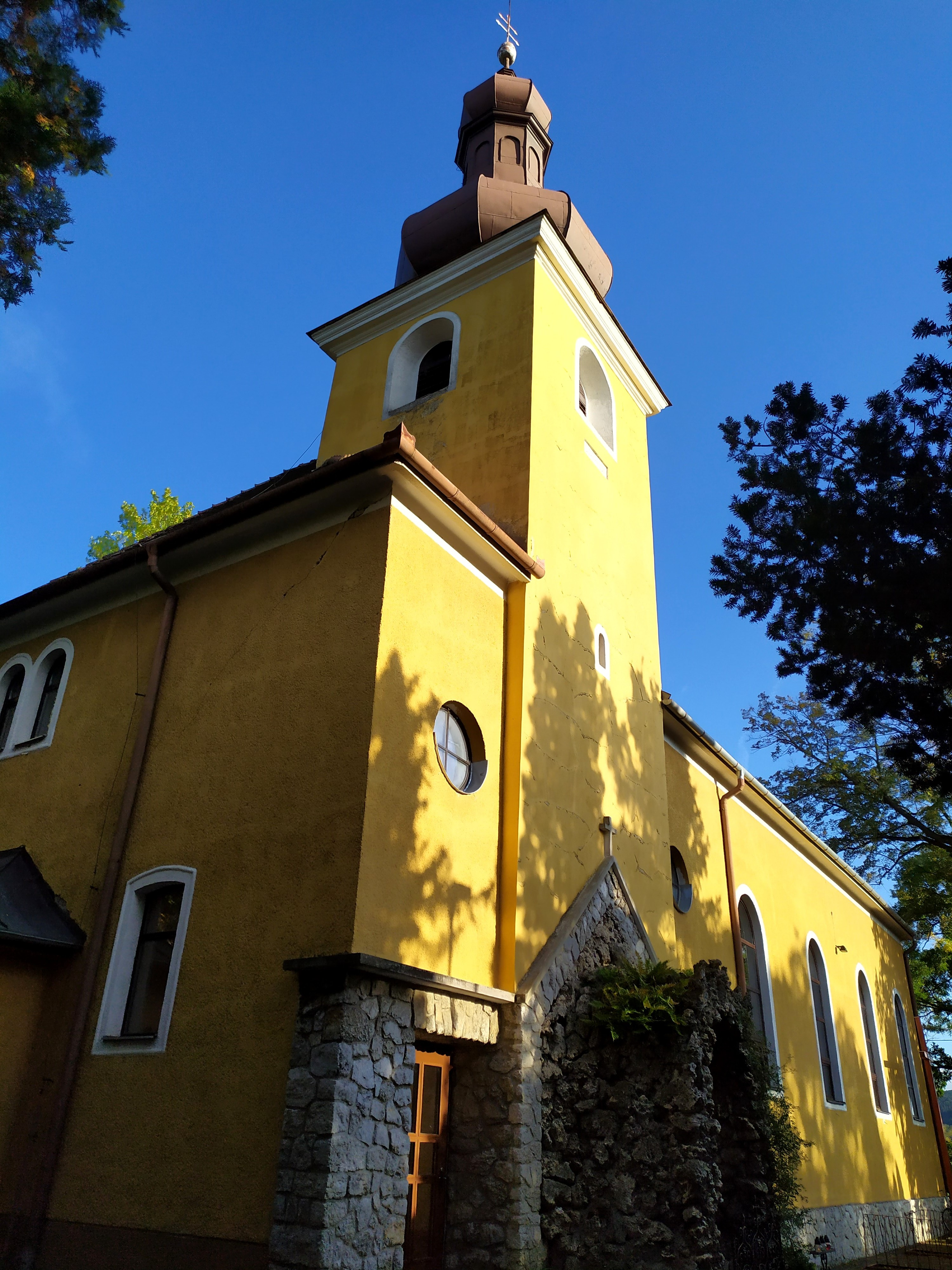

- Flag

- Location of Nová Ves nad Váhom in the Trenčín Region Location of Nová Ves nad Váhom in Slovakia
- Coordinates: 48.73°N 17.88°E
- Country: Slovakia
- Region: Trenčín Region
- District: Nové Mesto nad Váhom District
- First mentioned: 1419

Area
  - Total: 12.11 km^{2} (4.68 sq mi)
- Elevation: 181 m (594 ft)

Population (2025)
  - Total: 560
- Time zone: UTC+1 (CET)
  - Summer (DST): UTC+2 (CEST)
- Postal code: 916 31
- Area code: +421 32
- Vehicle registration plate (until 2022): NM
- Website: www.novavesnadvahom.sk

Nová Ves nad Váhom (Hungarian: Vágújfalu) is a village and municipality in Nové Mesto nad Váhom District in the Trenčín Region of western Slovakia.

== History ==
In historical records the village was first mentioned in 1419. Before the establishment of independent Czechoslovakia in 1918, Nová Ves nad Váhom was part of Trencsén County within the Kingdom of Hungary. From 1939 to 1945, it was part of the Slovak Republic.

== Geography ==
The municipality lies at an altitude of 181 metres (594 ft) and covers an area of 12.11 km^{2} (4.68 sq mi) (2025).

== Population ==
Population statistic (10 years)
Year	1995	2005	2015	2025
Count	535	524	543	560
Difference		−2.05%	+3.62%	+3.13%

Population statistic
Year	2024	2025
Count	564	560
Difference		−0.70%

It has a population of 560 people (31 December 2025).

=== Ethnicity ===
Census 2021 (1+ %)
Ethnicity	Number	Fraction
Slovak	542	98.9%
Czech	8	1.45%
Total	548	

In year 2021 was 548 people by ethnicity 542 as Slovak, 8 as Czech, 4 as Not found out, 1 as Romanian and 1 as English.

Note on population: The difference values of population numbers in the table "Population statistic" and in the sections "Ethnicity" & "Religion" is caused by the use of various statistical methods.

=== Religion ===
Census 2021 (1+ %)
Religion	Number	Fraction
Roman Catholic Church	376	68.61%
None	126	22.99%
Evangelical Church	21	3.83%
Apostolic Church	13	2.37%
Not found out	6	1.09%
Total	548	

In year 2021 was 548 people by religion 376 from Roman Catholic Church, 126 from None, 21 from Evangelical Church, 13 from Apostolic Church, 6 from Not found out, 3 from Christian Congregations in Slovakia, 1 from Calvinist Church, 1 from Paganism and natural spirituality and 1 from Greek Catholic Church.
