= Brunovce =

- Municipality
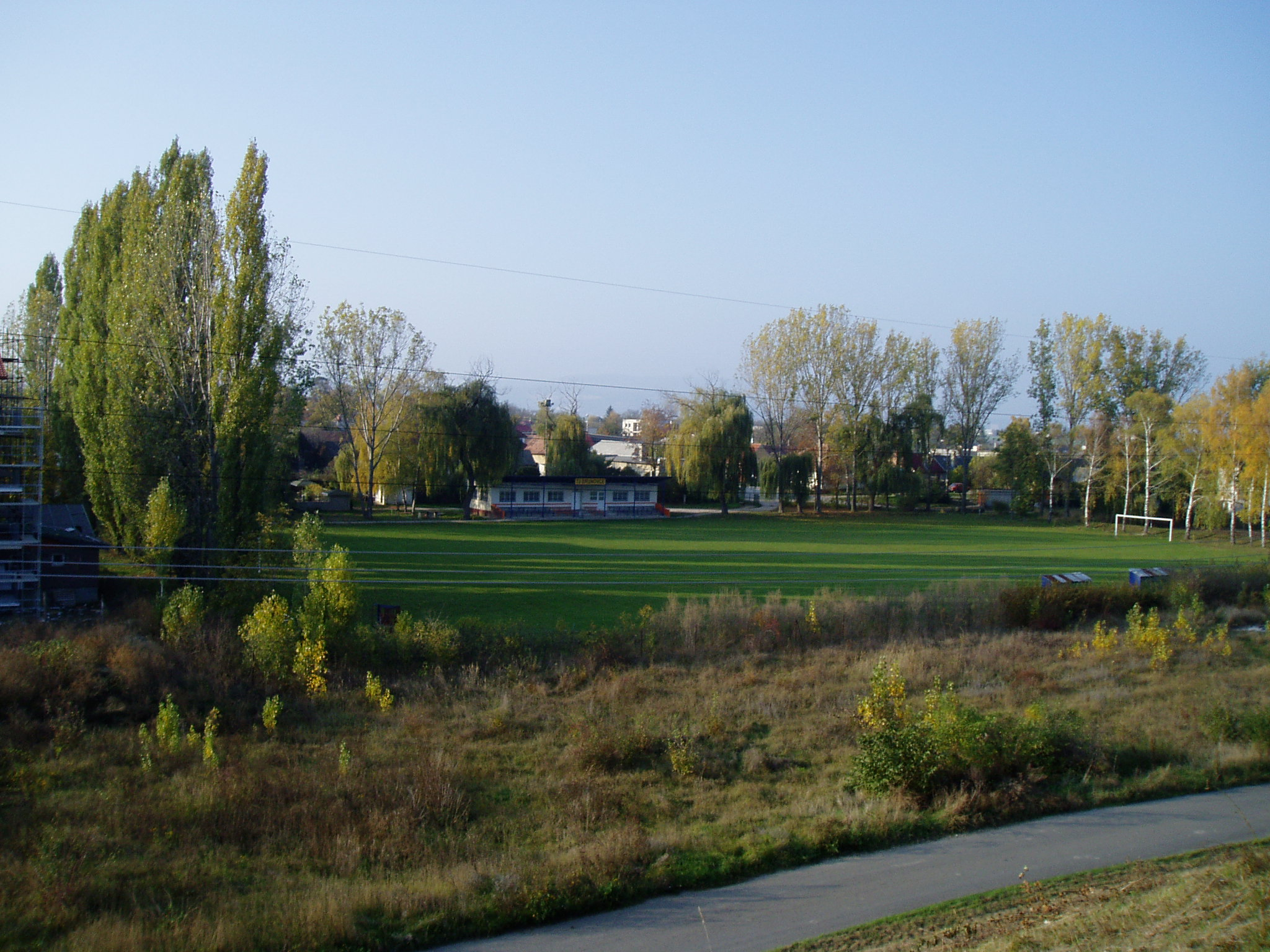

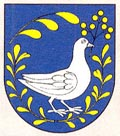
- Flag Coat of arms

- Location of Brunovce in the Trenčín Region Location of Brunovce in Slovakia
- Coordinates: 48.67°N 17.85°E
- Country: Slovakia
- Region: Trenčín Region
- District: Nové Mesto nad Váhom District
- First mentioned: 1374

Government
  - Mayor: Pavol Šupka (HLAS-SD)

Area
  - Total: 5.82 km^{2} (2.25 sq mi)
- Elevation: 172 m (564 ft)

Population (2025)
  - Total: 629
- Time zone: UTC+1 (CET)
  - Summer (DST): UTC+2 (CEST)
- Postal code: 916 25
- Area code: +421 32
- Vehicle registration plate (until 2022): NM
- Website: www.brunovce.sk

Brunovce (Hungarian: Brunóc) is a village and municipality in Nové Mesto nad Váhom District in the Trenčín Region of western Slovakia.

== History ==
In historical records the village was first mentioned in 1374. Before the establishment of independent Czechoslovakia in 1918, Brunovce was part of Nyitra County within the Kingdom of Hungary. From 1939 to 1945, it was part of the Slovak Republic.

== Geography ==
The municipality lies at an altitude of 172 metres (564 ft) and covers an area of 5.82 km^{2} (2.25 sq mi) (2025).

== Population ==
Population statistic (10 years)
Year	1995	2005	2015	2025
Count	550	545	549	629
Difference		−0.90%	+0.73%	+14.57%

Population statistic
Year	2024	2025
Count	638	629
Difference		−1.41%

It has a population of 629 people (31 December 2025).

=== Ethnicity ===
Census 2021 (1+ %)
Ethnicity	Number	Fraction
Slovak	563	94.94%
Not found out	28	4.72%
Total	593	

In year 2021 was 593 people by ethnicity 563 as Slovak, 28 as Not found out, 4 as Rusyn, 2 as Russian, 1 as Serbian, 1 as Silesian, 1 as Moravian and 1 as Croatian.

Note on population: The difference values of population numbers in the table "Population statistic" and in the sections "Ethnicity" & "Religion" is caused by the use of various statistical methods.

=== Religion ===
Census 2021 (1+ %)
Religion	Number	Fraction
Roman Catholic Church	418	70.49%
None	113	19.06%
Not found out	28	4.72%
Evangelical Church	14	2.36%
Total	593	

In year 2021 was 593 people by religion 418 from Roman Catholic Church, 113 from None, 28 from Not found out, 14 from Evangelical Church, 4 from Other, 4 from Greek Catholic Church, 3 from Calvinist Church, 2 from Eastern Orthodox Church, 2 from Ad hoc movements, 1 from Paganism and natural spirituality, 1 from Jehovah's Witnesses, 1 from Christian Congregations in Slovakia, 1 from Buddhism and 1 from Baptists Church.

== Genealogical resources ==
The records for genealogical research are available at the state archive "Statny Archiv in Bratislava, Slovakia"

- Roman Catholic church records (births/marriages/deaths): 1700-1913 (parish B)
- Lutheran church records (births/marriages/deaths): 1871-1895 (parish B)

== See also ==
- List of municipalities and towns in Slovakia
