= Očkov =

- Municipality
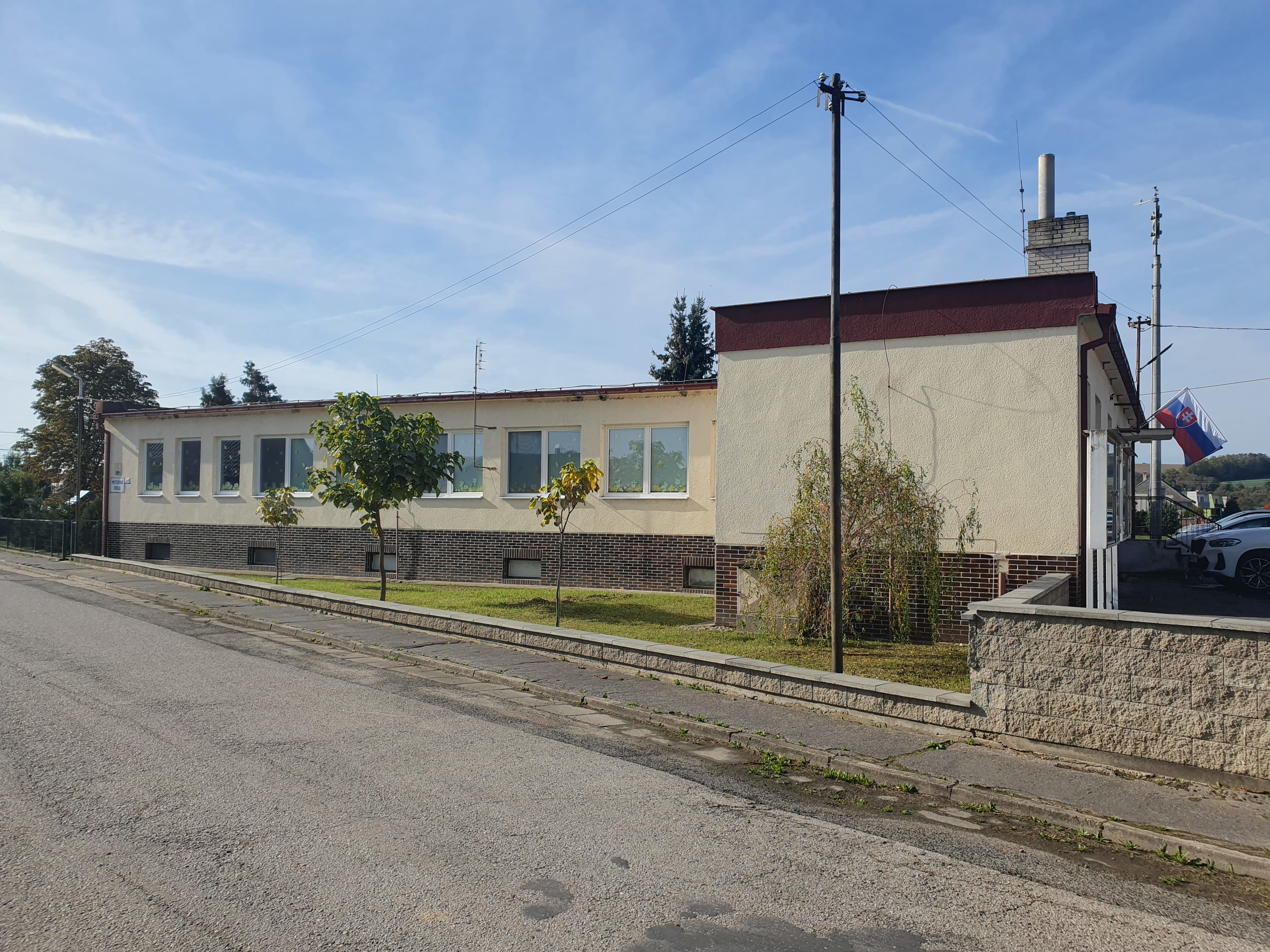

- Flag

- Location of Očkov in the Trenčín Region Location of Očkov in Slovakia
- Coordinates: 48.65°N 17.77°E
- Country: Slovakia
- Region: Trenčín Region
- District: Nové Mesto nad Váhom District
- First mentioned: 1321

Area
  - Total: 4.94 km^{2} (1.91 sq mi)
- Elevation: 166 m (545 ft)

Population (2025)
  - Total: 490
- Time zone: UTC+1 (CET)
  - Summer (DST): UTC+2 (CEST)
- Postal code: 916 22
- Area code: +421 32
- Vehicle registration plate (until 2022): NM
- Website: ockov.sk

Očkov (Hungarian: Ocskó) is a village and municipality in Nové Mesto nad Váhom District in the Trenčín Region of western Slovakia.

== History ==
In historical records the village was first mentioned in 1321. Before the establishment of independent Czechoslovakia in 1918, Očkov was part of Nyitra County within the Kingdom of Hungary. From 1939 to 1945, it was part of the Slovak Republic.

== Geography ==
The municipality lies at an altitude of 166 metres (545 ft) and covers an area of 4.94 km^{2} (1.91 sq mi) (2025).

== Population ==
Population statistic (10 years)
| Year | 1995 | 2005 | 2015 | 2025 |
|---|---|---|---|---|
| Count | 418 | 462 | 498 | 490 |
| Difference | | +10.52% | +7.79% | −1.60% |

Population statistic
| Year | 2024 | 2025 |
|---|---|---|
| Count | 493 | 490 |
| Difference | | −0.60% |

It has a population of 490 people (31 December 2025).

=== Ethnicity ===
Census 2021 (1+ %)
| Ethnicity | Number | Fraction |
|---|---|---|
| Slovak | 465 | 98.51% |
| Not found out | 5 | 1.05% |
| Total | 472 | |

In year 2021 was 472 people by ethnicity 465 as Slovak, 5 as Not found out, 2 as Other, 1 as Czech, 1 as Russian and 1 as Hungarian.

Note on population: The difference values of population numbers in the table "Population statistic" and in the sections "Ethnicity" & "Religion" is caused by the use of various statistical methods.

=== Religion ===
Census 2021 (1+ %)
| Religion | Number | Fraction |
|---|---|---|
| Roman Catholic Church | 377 | 79.87% |
| None | 69 | 14.62% |
| Evangelical Church | 11 | 2.33% |
| Greek Catholic Church | 6 | 1.27% |
| Not found out | 5 | 1.06% |
| Total | 472 | |

In year 2021 was 472 people by religion 377 from Roman Catholic Church, 69 from None, 11 from Evangelical Church, 6 from Greek Catholic Church, 5 from Not found out, 1 from Islam, 1 from United Methodist Church, 1 from Church of Jesus Christ of Latter-day Saints and 1 from Buddhism.
