= Potvorice =

- Municipality
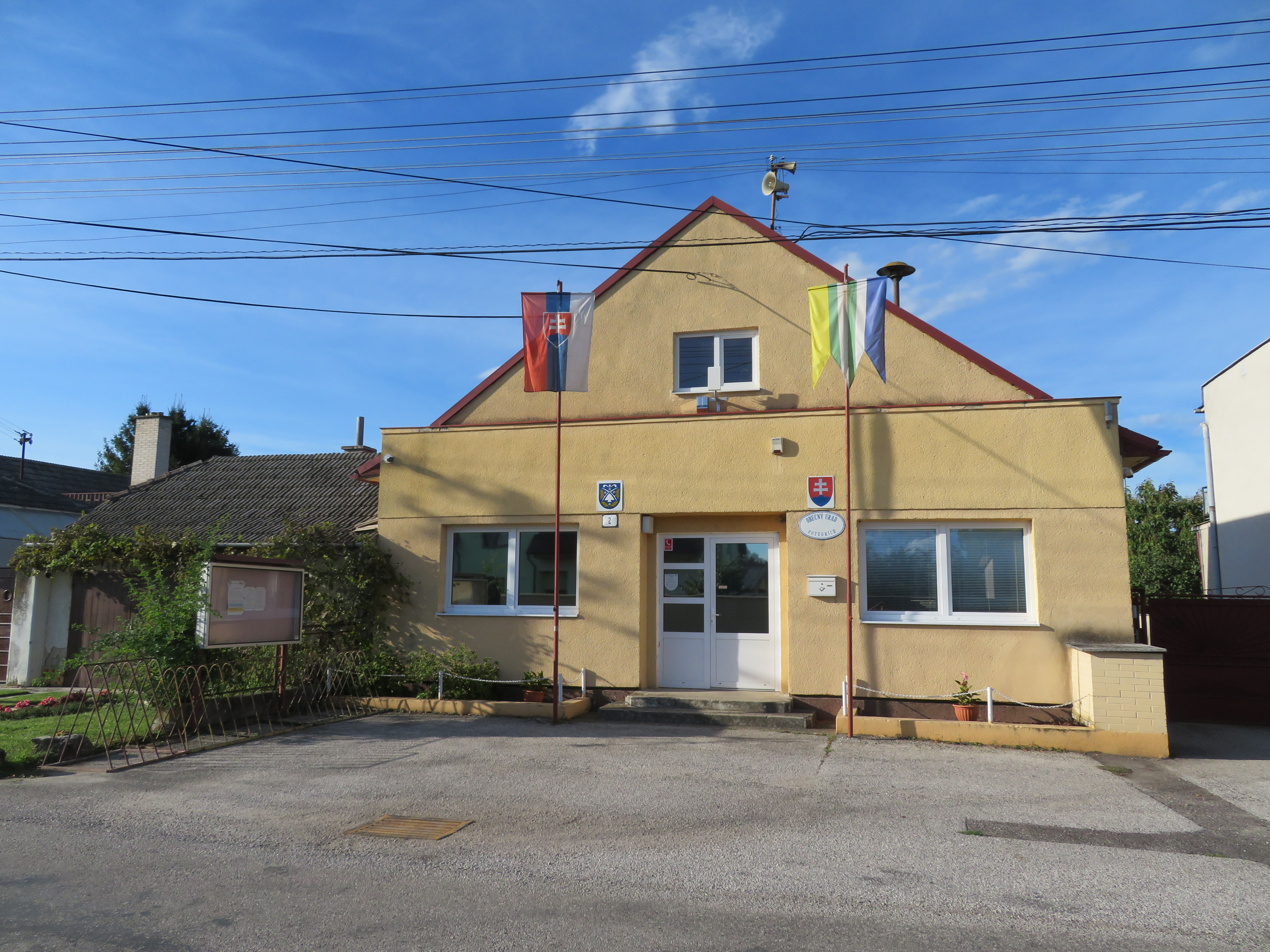

- Flag

- Location of Potvorice in the Trenčín Region Location of Potvorice in Slovakia
- Coordinates: 48.68°N 17.85°E
- Country: Slovakia
- Region: Trenčín Region
- District: Nové Mesto nad Váhom District
- First mentioned: 1263

Area
  - Total: 4.04 km^{2} (1.56 sq mi)
- Elevation: 174 m (571 ft)

Population (2025)
  - Total: 732
- Time zone: UTC+1 (CET)
  - Summer (DST): UTC+2 (CEST)
- Postal code: 916 25
- Area code: +421 32
- Vehicle registration plate (until 2022): NM
- Website: www.potvorice.sk

Potvorice (Hungarian: Patvaróc) is a village and municipality in Nové Mesto nad Váhom District in the Trenčín Region of western Slovakia.

== History ==
In historical records the village was first mentioned in 1263. Before the establishment of independent Czechoslovakia in 1918, Potvorice was part of Nyitra County within the Kingdom of Hungary. From 1939 to 1945, it was part of the Slovak Republic.

== Geography ==
The municipality lies at an altitude of 174 metres (571 ft) and covers an area of 4.04 km^{2} (1.56 sq mi) (2025).

== Population ==
Population statistic (10 years)
Year	1995	2005	2015	2025
Count	519	556	634	732
Difference		+7.12%	+14.02%	+15.45%

Population statistic
Year	2024	2025
Count	714	732
Difference		+2.52%

It has a population of 732 people (31 December 2025).

=== Ethnicity ===
Census 2021 (1+ %)
Ethnicity	Number	Fraction
Slovak	668	98.09%
Not found out	8	1.17%
Total	681	

In year 2021 was 681 people by ethnicity 668 as Slovak, 8 as Not found out, 5 as Czech, 4 as Hungarian, 3 as Other, 1 as Austrian, 1 as German and 1 as Moravian.

Note on population: The difference values of population numbers in the table "Population statistic" and in the sections "Ethnicity" & "Religion" is caused by the use of various statistical methods.

=== Religion ===
Census 2021 (1+ %)
Religion	Number	Fraction
Roman Catholic Church	462	67.84%
None	160	23.49%
Evangelical Church	38	5.58%
Total	681	

In year 2021 was 681 people by religion 462 from Roman Catholic Church, 160 from None, 38 from Evangelical Church, 6 from Not found out, 5 from Greek Catholic Church, 5 from Ad hoc movements, 1 from Eastern Orthodox Church, 1 from Other and not ascertained christian church, 1 from Christian Congregations in Slovakia, 1 from Other and 1 from Buddhism.
