= Hrachovište =

- Municipality
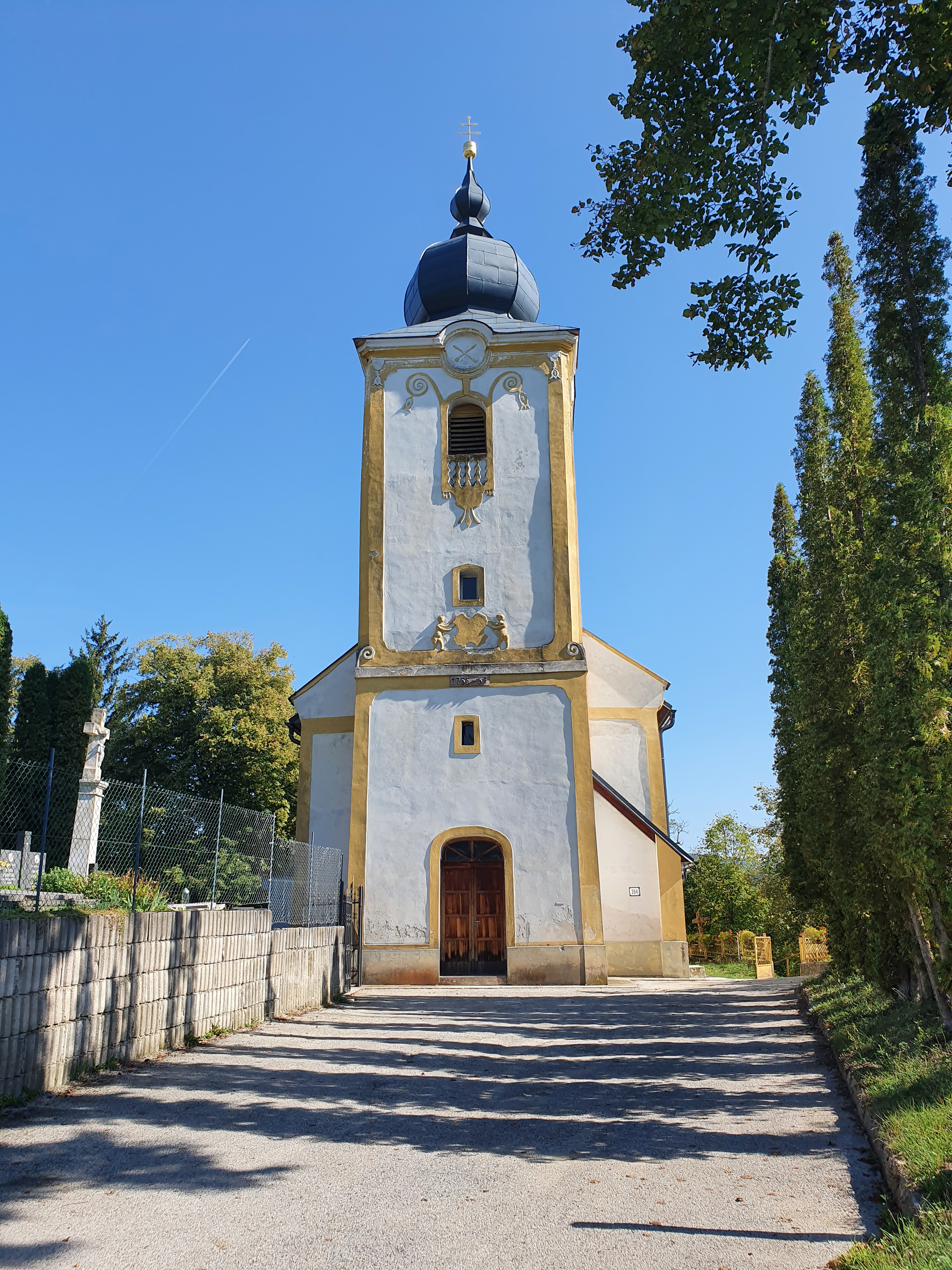

- Flag Coat of arms

- Location of Hrachovište in the Trenčín Region Location of Hrachovište in Slovakia
- Coordinates: 48.72°N 17.73°E
- Country: Slovakia
- Region: Trenčín Region
- District: Nové Mesto nad Váhom District
- First mentioned: 1392

Area
  - Total: 9.20 km^{2} (3.55 sq mi)
- Elevation: 210 m (690 ft)

Population (2025)
  - Total: 632
- Time zone: UTC+1 (CET)
  - Summer (DST): UTC+2 (CEST)
- Postal code: 916 15
- Area code: +421 32
- Vehicle registration plate (until 2022): NM
- Website: www.hrachoviste.sk

Hrachovište is a village and municipality in Nové Mesto nad Váhom District in the Trenčín Region of western Slovakia.

== History ==
In historical records the village was first mentioned in 1392. Before the establishment of independent Czechoslovakia in 1918, Hrachovište was part of Nyitra County within the Kingdom of Hungary. From 1939 to 1945, it was part of the Slovak Republic.

== Geography ==
The municipality lies at an altitude of 210 metres (690 ft) and covers an area of 9.20 km^{2} (3.55 sq mi) (2025).

== Population ==
Population statistic (10 years)
Year	1995	2005	2015	2025
Count	660	705	723	632
Difference		+6.81%	+2.55%	−12.58%

Population statistic
Year	2024	2025
Count	644	632
Difference		−1.86%

It has a population of 632 people (31 December 2025).

=== Ethnicity ===
Census 2021 (1+ %)
Ethnicity	Number	Fraction
Slovak	652	96.44%
Not found out	23	3.4%
Romani	9	1.33%
Total	676	

In year 2021 was 676 people by ethnicity 652 as Slovak, 23 as Not found out, 9 as Romani, 5 as Czech, 2 as Irish, 2 as Ukrainian, 2 as Hungarian, 1 as Rusyn, 1 as Polish and 1 as Other.

Note on population: The difference values of population numbers in the table "Population statistic" and in the sections "Ethnicity" & "Religion" is caused by the use of various statistical methods.

=== Religion ===
Census 2021 (1+ %)
Religion	Number	Fraction
Roman Catholic Church	312	46.15%
None	203	30.03%
Evangelical Church	119	17.6%
Not found out	24	3.55%
Total	676	

In year 2021 was 676 people by religion 312 from Roman Catholic Church, 203 from None, 119 from Evangelical Church, 24 from Not found out, 3 from Islam, 3 from Ad hoc movements, 2 from Other and not ascertained christian church, 2 from Jehovah's Witnesses, 2 from Other, 1 from Old Catholic Church, 1 from Calvinist Church, 1 from Eastern Orthodox Church, 1 from Hinduism, 1 from Greek Catholic Church and 1 from United Methodist Church.

== Genealogical resources ==
The records for genealogical research are available at the state archive "Statny Archiv in Bratislava, Slovakia"

- Roman Catholic church records (births/marriages/deaths): 1661-1921 (parish A)
- Lutheran church records (births/marriages/deaths): 1867-1952 (parish B)

== See also ==
- List of municipalities and towns in Slovakia
