= Haluzice, Nové Mesto nad Váhom District =

Haluzice
- Municipality
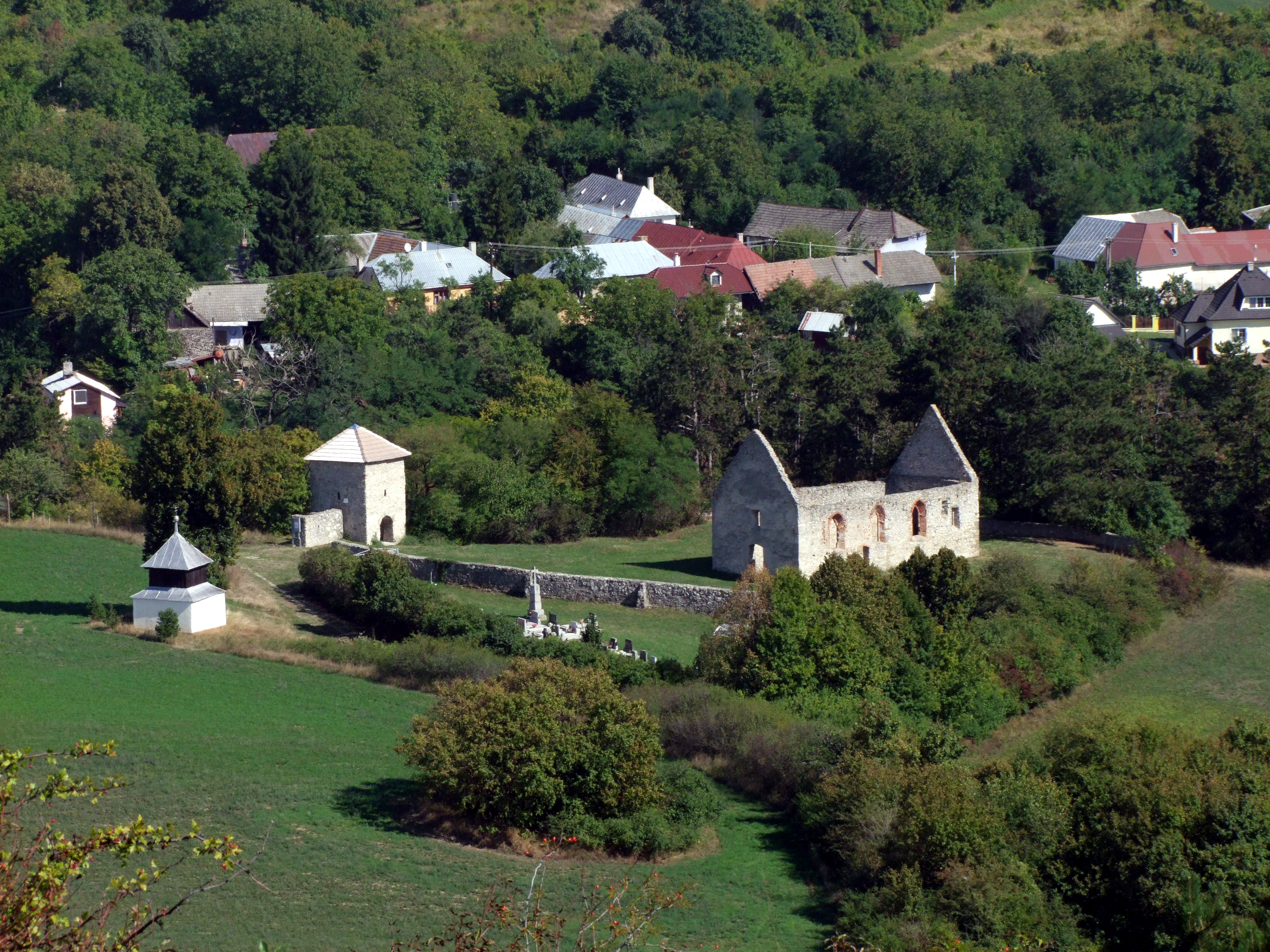
- Ruins of a Romanesque church in Haluzice

- Flag

- Location of Haluzice in the Trenčín Region Location of Haluzice in Slovakia
- Coordinates: 48°49′23″N 17°51′56″E
- Country: Slovakia
- Region: Trenčín Region
- District: Nové Mesto nad Váhom District
- First mentioned: 1380

Area
  - Total: 3.84 km^{2} (1.48 sq mi)
- Elevation: 266 m (873 ft)

Population (2025)
  - Total: 91
- Time zone: UTC+1 (CET)
  - Summer (DST): UTC+2 (CEST)
- Postal code: 913 07
- Area code: +421 32
- Vehicle registration plate (until 2022): NM
- Website: obechaluzice.sk

Haluzice (Hungarian: Gallyas) is a village and municipality in Nové Mesto nad Váhom District in the Trenčín Region of western Slovakia.

== History ==
In historical records the village was first mentioned in 1299. A Romanesque church was built in the village by the Counts Cseszneky de Milvány. Later it was part of estates of Beckov castle. Before the establishment of independent Czechoslovakia in 1918, Haluzice was part of Trencsén County within the Kingdom of Hungary. From 1939 to 1945, it was part of the Slovak Republic.

== Geography ==
The municipality lies at an altitude of 266 metres (873 ft) and covers an area of 3.84 km^{2} (1.48 sq mi) (2025).

== Population ==
Population statistic (10 years)
Year	1995	2005	2015	2025
Count	74	53	72	91
Difference		−28.37%	+35.84%	+26.38%

Population statistic
Year	2024	2025
Count	94	91
Difference		−3.19%

It has a population of 91 people (31 December 2025).

=== Ethnicity ===
Census 2021 (1+ %)
Ethnicity	Number	Fraction
Slovak	71	94.66%
French	4	5.33%
Italian	1	1.33%
Serbian	1	1.33%
Not found out	1	1.33%
Total	75	

In year 2021 was 75 people by ethnicity 71 as Slovak, 4 as French, 1 as Italian, 1 as Serbian and 1 as Not found out.

Note on population: The difference values of population numbers in the table "Population statistic" and in the sections "Ethnicity" & "Religion" is caused by the use of various statistical methods.

=== Religion ===
Census 2021 (1+ %)
Religion	Number	Fraction
Roman Catholic Church	29	38.67%
None	29	38.67%
Evangelical Church	11	14.67%
Christian Congregations in Slovakia	2	2.67%
Other	2	2.67%
Eastern Orthodox Church	1	1.33%
Not found out	1	1.33%
Total	75	

In year 2021 was 75 people by religion 29 from Roman Catholic Church, 29 from None, 11 from Evangelical Church, 2 from Christian Congregations in Slovakia, 2 from Other, 1 from Eastern Orthodox Church and 1 from Not found out.

== Genealogical resources ==
The records for genealogical research are available at the state archive "Statny Archiv in Bratislava, Slovakia"

- Roman Catholic church records (births/marriages/deaths): 1691-1895 (parish B)
- Lutheran church records (births/marriages/deaths): 1784-1900 (parish B)

== See also ==
- List of municipalities and towns in Slovakia
