= Lubina, Slovakia =

Lubina
- Municipality
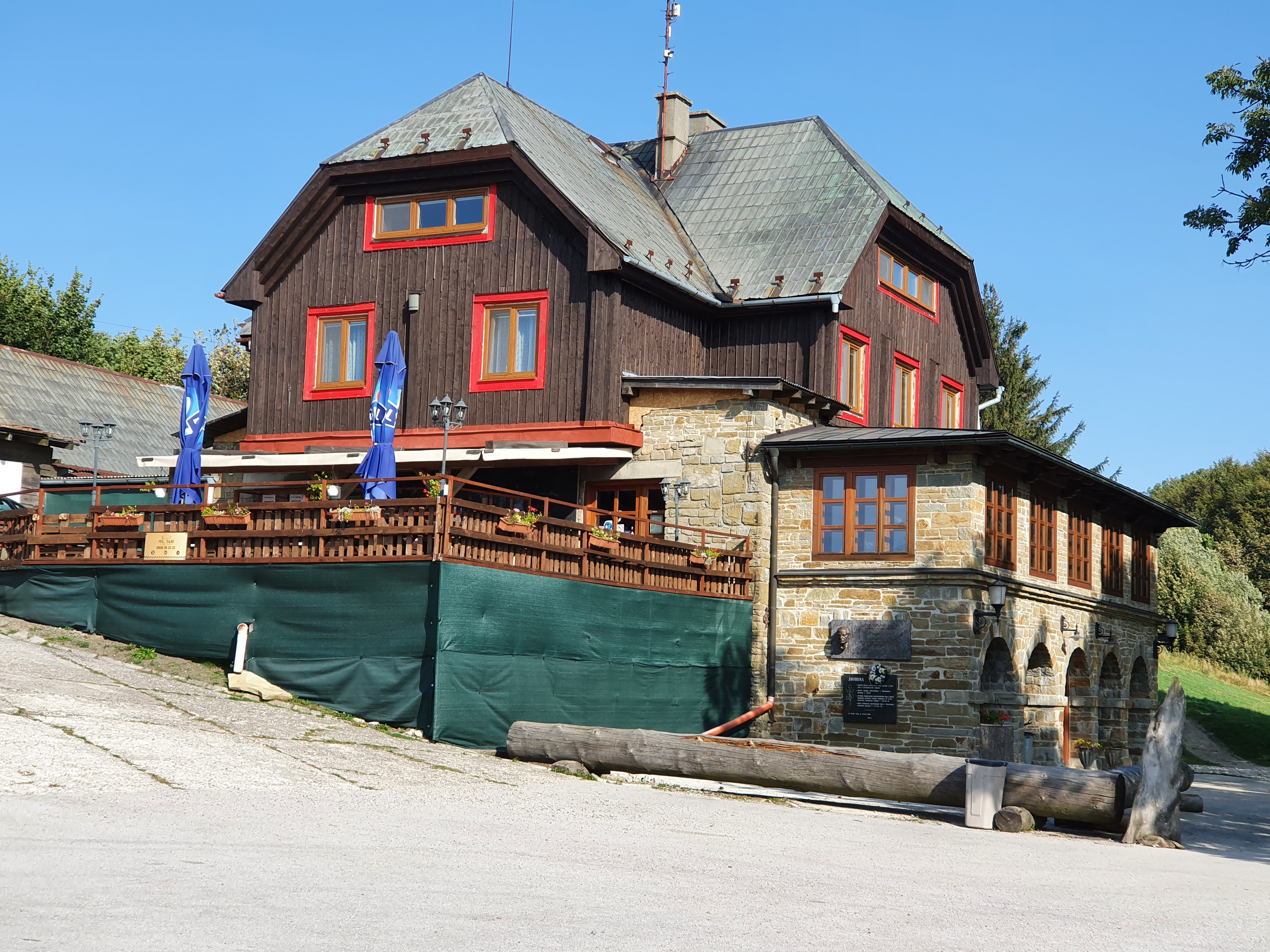

- Flag

- Location of Lubina in the Trenčín Region Location of Lubina in Slovakia
- Coordinates: 48°47′4″N 17°44′8″E
- Country: Slovakia
- Region: Trenčín Region
- District: Nové Mesto nad Váhom District
- First mentioned: 1392

Area
  - Total: 29.43 km^{2} (11.36 sq mi)
- Elevation: 313 m (1,027 ft)

Population (2025)
  - Total: 1,523
- Time zone: UTC+1 (CET)
  - Summer (DST): UTC+2 (CEST)
- Postal code: 916 12
- Area code: +421 32
- Vehicle registration plate (until 2022): NM
- Website: www.obeclubina.sk

Lubina (Hungarian: Lobonya) is a village and municipality in Nové Mesto nad Váhom District in the Trenčín Region of western Slovakia.

== History ==
In historical records the village was first mentioned in 1392. Before the establishment of independent Czechoslovakia in 1918, Lubina was part of Nyitra County within the Kingdom of Hungary. From 1939 to 1945, it was part of the Slovak Republic.

== Geography ==
The municipality lies at an altitude of 313 metres (1,027 ft) and covers an area of 29.43 km^{2} (11.36 sq mi) (2025).

== Population ==
Population statistic (10 years)
Year	1995	2005	2015	2025
Count	1533	1462	1377	1523
Difference		−4.63%	−5.81%	+10.60%

Population statistic
Year	2024	2025
Count	1505	1523
Difference		+1.19%

It has a population of 1523 people (31 December 2025).

=== Ethnicity ===
Census 2021 (1+ %)
Ethnicity	Number	Fraction
Slovak	1344	93.07%
Not found out	88	6.09%
Czech	15	1.03%
Total	1444	

In year 2021 was 1444 people by ethnicity 1344 as Slovak, 88 as Not found out, 15 as Czech, 6 as Other, 5 as German, 3 as Rusyn, 2 as Ukrainian, 2 as Serbian, 2 as Romani, 2 as Russian, 1 as Polish, 1 as Moravian, 1 as Hungarian and 1 as English.

Note on population: The difference values of population numbers in the table "Population statistic" and in the sections "Ethnicity" & "Religion" is caused by the use of various statistical methods.

=== Religion ===
Census 2021 (1+ %)
Religion	Number	Fraction
Evangelical Church	576	39.89%
None	442	30.61%
Roman Catholic Church	255	17.66%
Not found out	95	6.58%
Total	1444	

In year 2021 was 1444 people by religion 576 from Evangelical Church, 442 from None, 255 from Roman Catholic Church, 95 from Not found out, 13 from Other, 12 from Greek Catholic Church, 10 from Ad hoc movements, 7 from Church of the Brethren, 7 from Buddhism, 5 from Other and not ascertained christian church, 5 from United Methodist Church, 4 from Apostolic Church, 3 from Paganism and natural spirituality, 3 from Christian Congregations in Slovakia, 2 from Jewish community, 2 from Eastern Orthodox Church, 2 from Jehovah's Witnesses and 1 from Old Catholic Church.
