= Trencsén County =

County of the Kingdom of Hungary

Trencsén County Comitatus Trenchiniensis (Latin) Trencsén vármegye (Hungarian) Komitat Trentschin (German) Trenčianska župa (Slovak)
- County of the Kingdom of Hungary
- 11th century–1920
- Coat of arms

- Capital: Trencsén
- Area
  - Coordinates: 48°54′N 18°2′E
  - 1910: 4,456 km^{2} (1,720 sq mi)
- Population
  - 1910: 310,437
- History
  - Established: 11th century
  - Treaty of Trianon: 4 June 1920
- Today part of: Slovakia
- Trenčín is the current name of the capital.

Trencsén county (Latin: comitatus Trentsiniensis / Trenchiniensis; Hungarian: Trencsén (vár)megye; Slovak: Trenčiansky komitát / Trenčianska stolica / Trenčianska župa; German: Trentschiner Gespanschaft / Komitat) was an administrative county (comitatus) of the Kingdom of Hungary. Its territory is now in western Slovakia.

== Geography ==
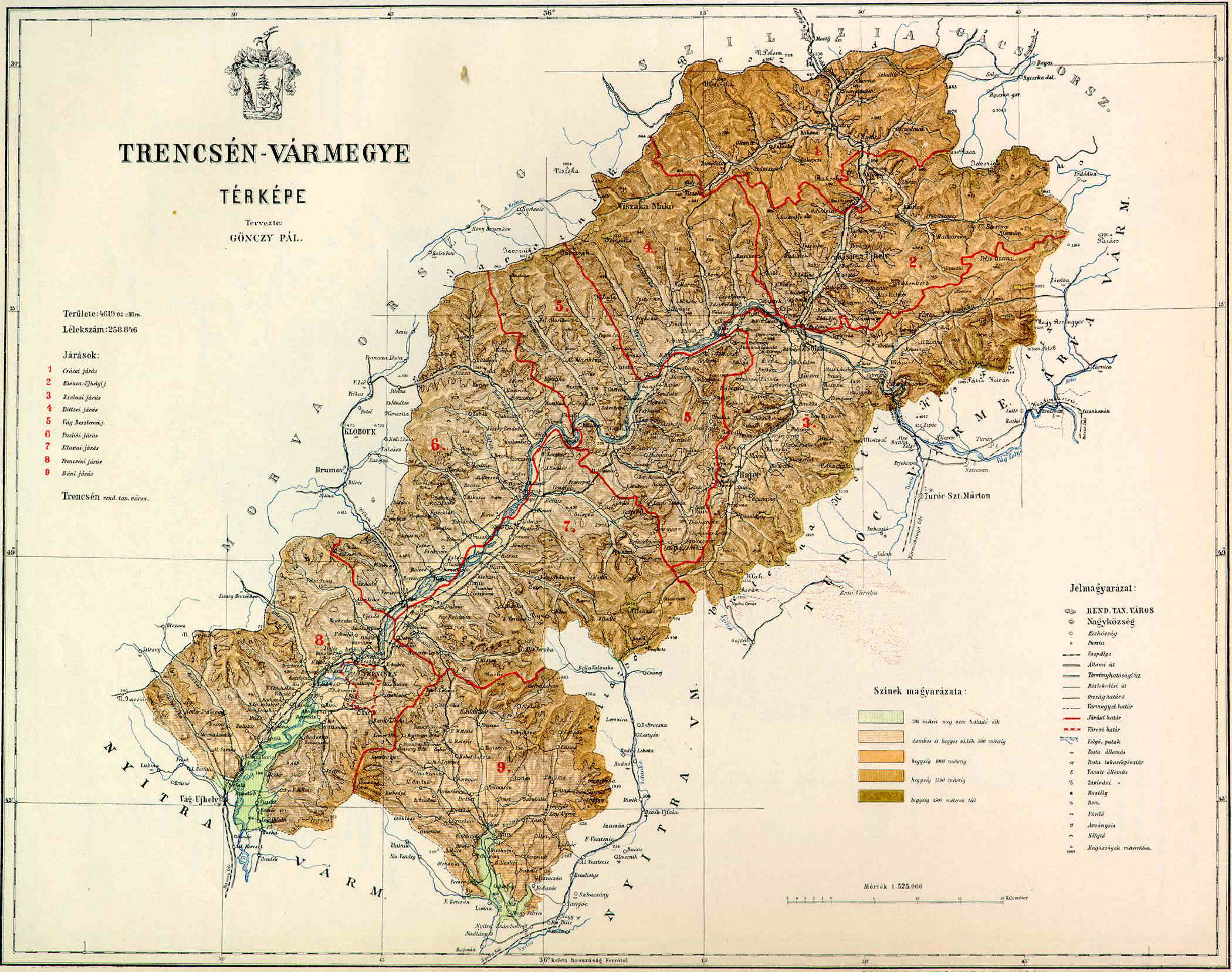
Map of Trencsén, 1891

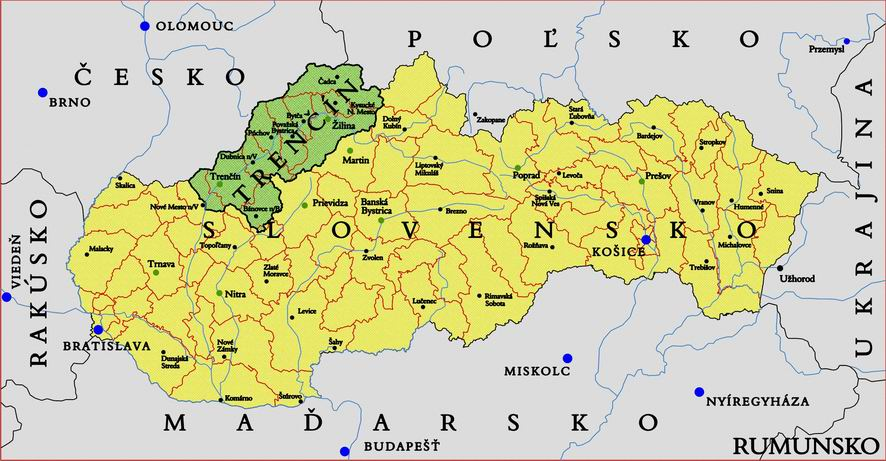
Former county of Trencsén superimposed on map of contemporary Slovakia

Trencsén county shared borders with the Austrian lands Moravia, Galicia, and Silesia, and the Hungarian counties Árva, Turóc and Nyitra. The county's territory was a strip in the extreme northwestern edge of present-day Slovakia, i.e. the territory between the Czech border, the town of Vágújhely, the Turóc county, the Árva county and the Polish border. The river Vág flowed through the county. Its area was 4,456 km^{2} around 1910.

== Capitals ==
The capital of Trencsén County was the Trenčín Castle (Hungarian: Trencséni vár), and from around 1650 the town of Trencsén.

== History ==
A predecessor of the Trencsén county maybe existed already in the 9th century, at the time of Great Moravia, with a center in Ducové. In the 10th and 11th century, the county was probably temporarily part of Bohemia and then temporarily of Poland (castellania Trecen).

The Trencsén county as a Hungarian comitatus arose at the end of the 11th century, when most parts of the territory were conquered by the Kingdom of Hungary. Traditionally, the office of hereditary lord lieutenant of Trencsén county was held by the Csák, Cseszneky and Illésházy families.

In the aftermath of World War I, Trencsén county became part of newly formed Czechoslovakia, as recognized by the concerned states in 1920 by the Treaty of Trianon. The county as (Trenčianska župa) continued to exist until 1922, but it had completely different powers, etc.

During the existence of the first Slovak State between 1939 and 1945, Trenčín county was recreated again in 1940, but its territory was slightly extended. After World War II Trenčín county became part of Czechoslovakia again. In 1993, Czechoslovakia was split and Trenčín became part of Slovakia.

== Demographics ==
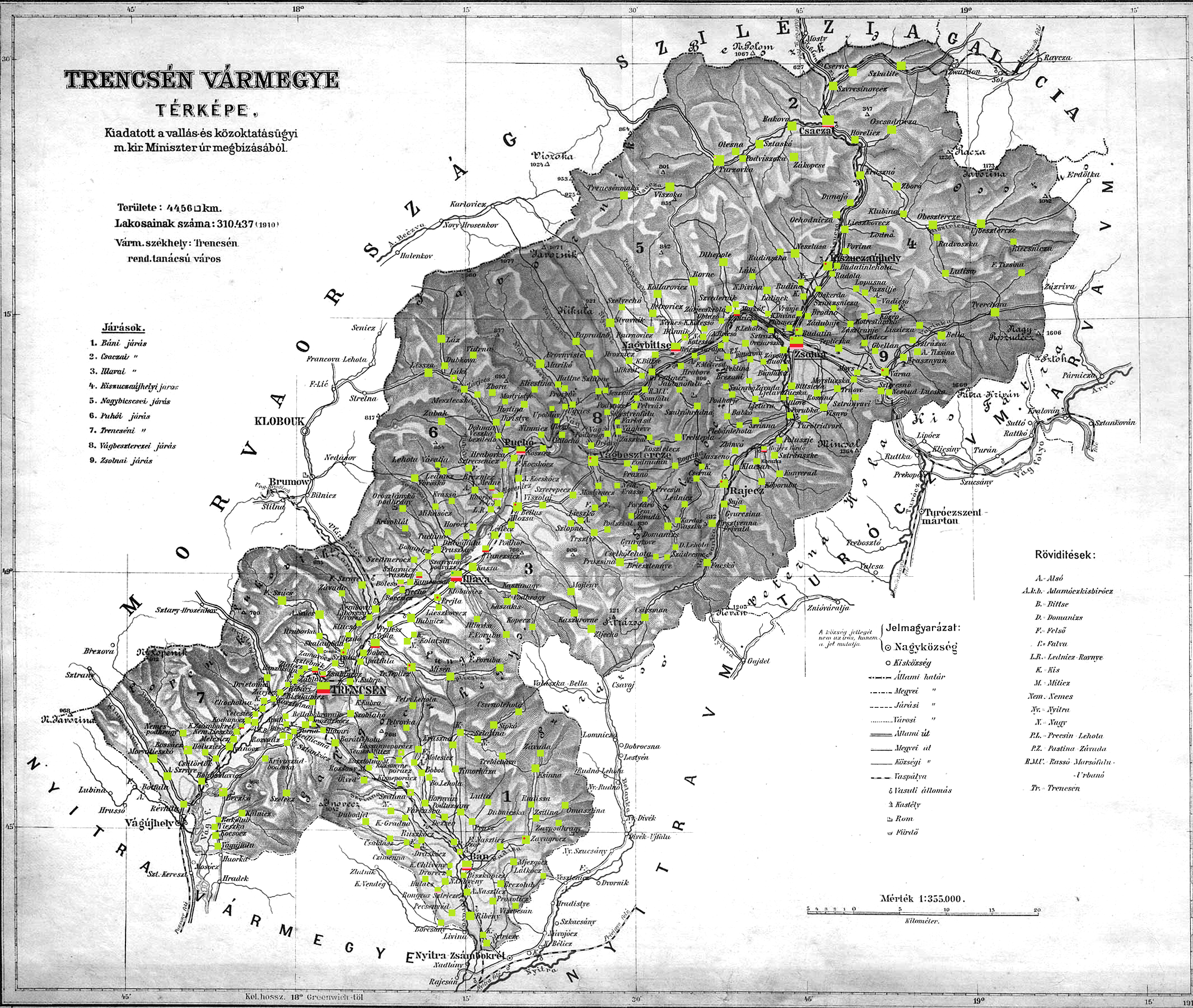
Ethnic map of the county with data of the 1910 census (see the key in the description)

Population by mother tongue (Note: Only linguistic communities > 1% are displayed.)
| Census | Total | Slovak | Hungarian | German | Other or unknown |
|---|---|---|---|---|---|
| 1880 | 244,919 | 222,786 (93.96%) | 2,576 (1.09%) | 10,634 (4.48%) | 1,113 (0.47%) |
| 1890 | 258,769 | 241,818 (93.45%) | 5,082 (1.96%) | 10,267 (3.97%) | 1,602 (0.62%) |
| 1900 | 287,665 | 266,763 (92.73%) | 8,210 (2.85%) | 10,213 (3.55%) | 2,479 (0.86%) |
| 1910 | 310,437 | 284,770 (91.73%) | 13,204 (4.25%) | 9,029 (2.91%) | 3,434 (1.11%) |

Population by religion (Note: Only religious communities > 1% are displayed.)
| Census | Total | Roman Catholic | Lutheran | Jewish | Other or unknown |
|---|---|---|---|---|---|
| 1880 | 244,919 | 211,355 (86.30%) | 20,357 (8.31%) | 12,940 (5.28%) | 267 (0.11%) |
| 1890 | 258,769 | 224,259 (86.66%) | 21,546 (8.33%) | 12,463 (4.82%) | 501 (0.19%) |
| 1900 | 287,665 | 250,628 (87.12%) | 24,890 (8.65%) | 11,397 (3,96%) | 750 (0.26%) |
| 1910 | 310,437 | 271,233 (87.37%) | 27,421 (8.83%) | 10,809 (3.48%) | 974 (0.31%) |

== Subdivisions ==
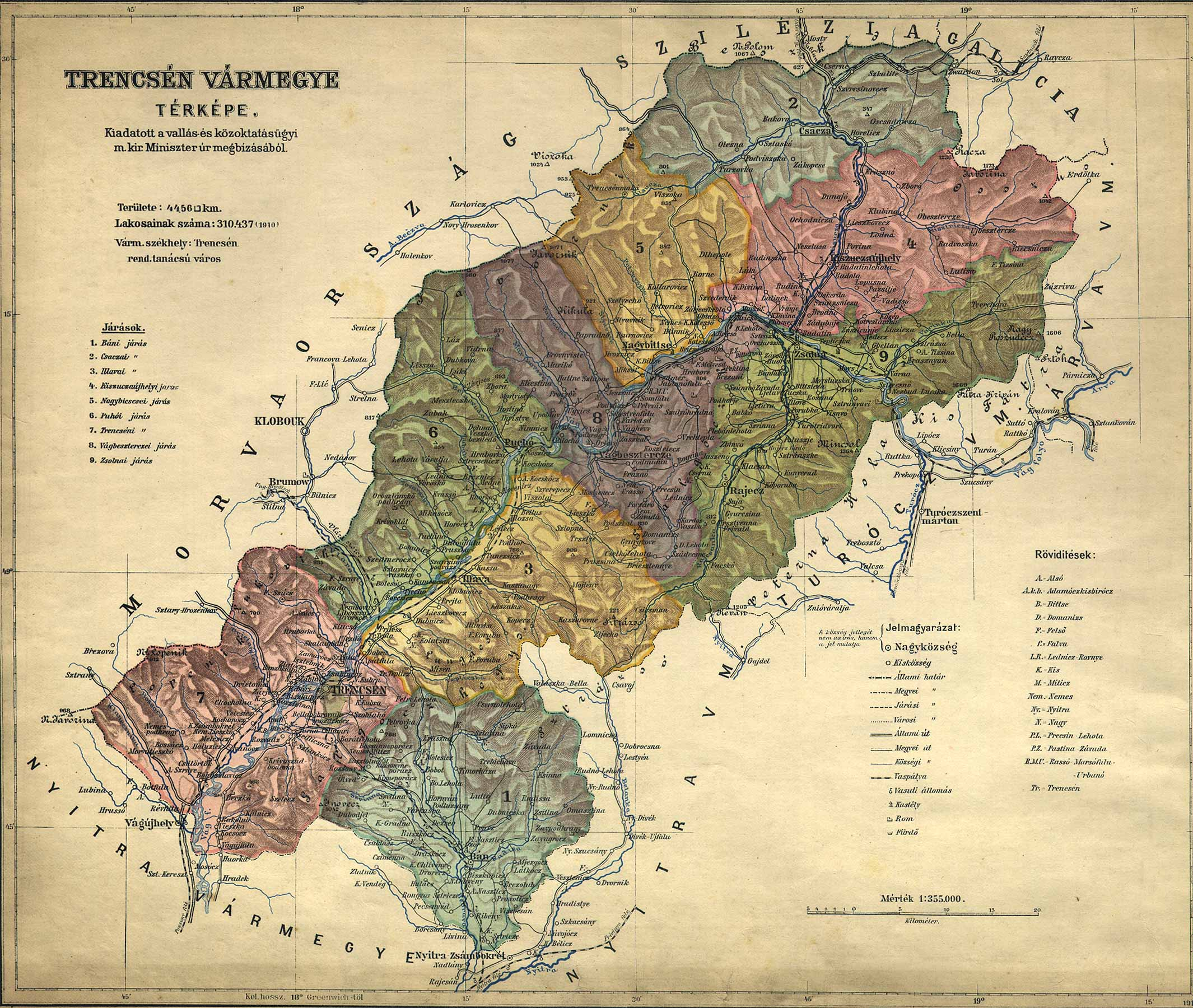

In the early 20th century, the subdivisions of Trencsén county were:

Districts (járás)
| District | Capital |
|---|---|
| Bán | Bán (now Bánovce nad Bebravou) |
| Csaca | Csaca (now Čadca) |
| Illava | Illava (now Ilava) |
| Kiszucaújhely | Kiszucaújhely (now Kysucké Nové Mesto) |
| Nagybiccse | Nagybiccse (now Bytča) |
| Puhó | Puhó (now Púchov) |
| Trencsén | Trencsén (now Trenčín) |
| Vágbeszterce | Vágbeszterce (now Považská Bystrica) |
| Zsolna | Zsolna (now Žilina) |
Urban districts (rendezett tanácsú város)
Trencsén (now Trenčín)

== See also ==
- Current Trenčín Region of Slovakia
