= Rudník =

Rudník may refer to places:

- Rudník, Košice-okolie District, a municipality and village in Slovakia
- Rudník, Myjava District, a municipality and village in Slovakia
- Rudník (Trutnov District), a municipality and village in the Czech Republic
