= Brestovec =

Brestovec may refer to

- Brestovec, a settlement in the Komárno District in Slovakia
- Brestovec, a settlement in the Myjava District in Slovakia
- Brestovec, a settlement in the Rogaška Slatina municipality in Slovenia
