= Polianka, Slovakia =

Polianka
- Municipality
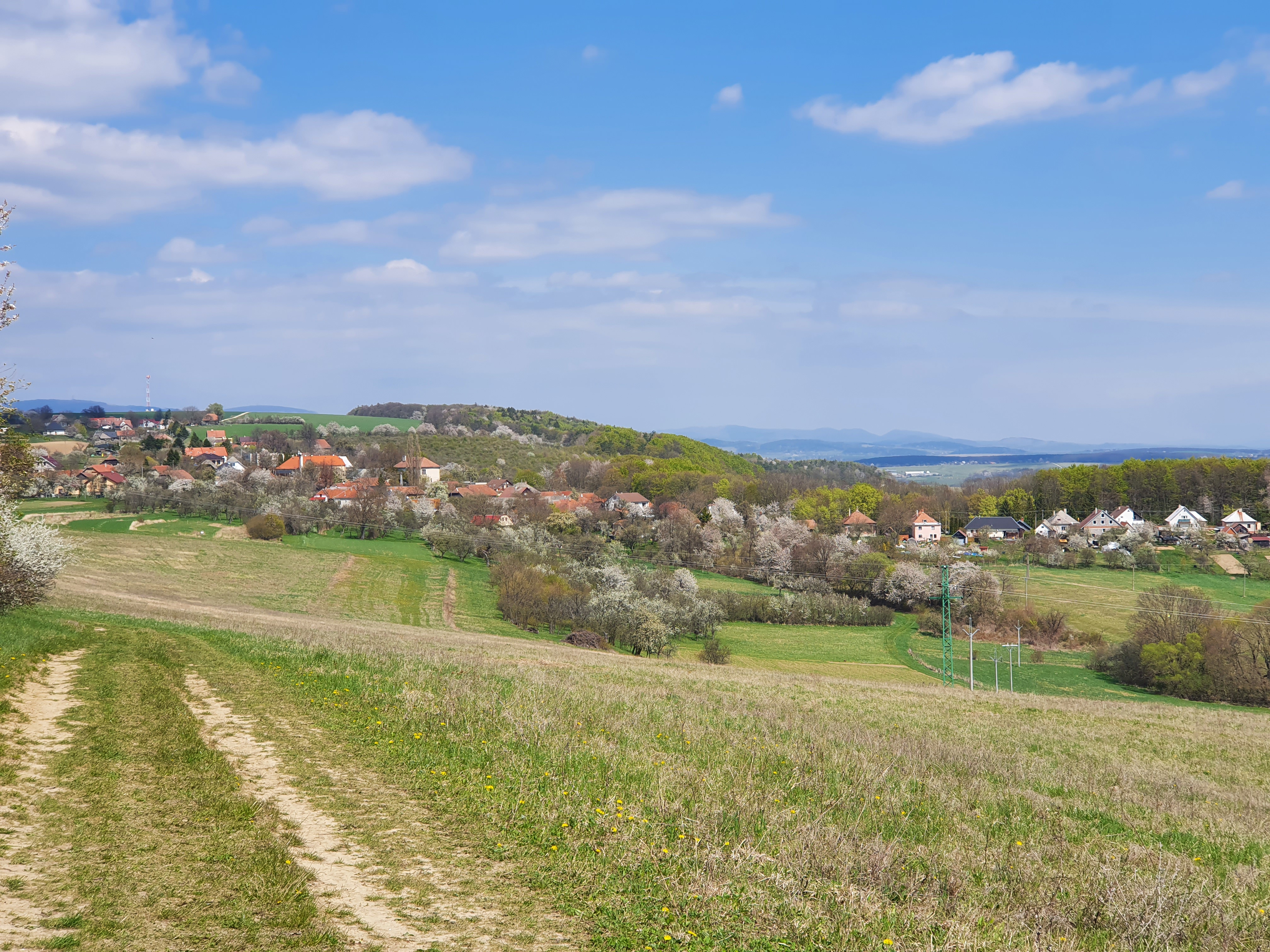

- Flag

- Location of Polianka in the Trenčín Region Location of Polianka in Slovakia
- Coordinates: 48°43′34″N 17°34′48″E
- Country: Slovakia
- Region: Trenčín Region
- District: Myjava District
- First mentioned: 1955

Area
  - Total: 9.41 km^{2} (3.63 sq mi)
- Elevation: 416 m (1,365 ft)

Population (2025)
  - Total: 397
- Time zone: UTC+1 (CET)
  - Summer (DST): UTC+2 (CEST)
- Postal code: 907 01
- Area code: +421 34
- Vehicle registration plate (until 2022): MY
- Website: obecpolianka.sk

Polianka is a village and municipality in Myjava District in the Trenčín Region of north-western Slovakia.

== History ==
In historical records the village was first mentioned in 1955. Before the establishment of independent Czechoslovakia in 1918, it was part of Nyitra County within the Kingdom of Hungary. From 1939 to 1945, it was part of the Slovak Republic.

== Geography ==
The municipality lies at an altitude of 416 metres (1,365 ft) and covers an area of 9.41 km^{2} (3.63 sq mi) (2025).

== Population ==
Population statistic (10 years)
Year	1995	2005	2015	2025
Count	393	359	395	397
Difference		−8.65%	+10.02%	+0.50%

Population statistic
Year	2024	2025
Count	396	397
Difference		+0.25%

It has a population of 397 people (31 December 2025).

=== Ethnicity ===
Census 2021 (1+ %)
Ethnicity	Number	Fraction
Slovak	369	93.18%
Czech	19	4.79%
Not found out	16	4.04%
Total	396	

In year 2021 was 396 people by ethnicity 369 as Slovak, 19 as Czech, 16 as Not found out, 3 as Romanian, 2 as Hungarian, 2 as Albanian, 1 as Jewish, 1 as Serbian, 1 as Silesian, 1 as Russian and 1 as German.

Note on population: The difference values of population numbers in the table "Population statistic" and in the sections "Ethnicity" & "Religion" is caused by the use of various statistical methods.

=== Religion ===
Census 2021 (1+ %)
Religion	Number	Fraction
Evangelical Church	204	51.52%
None	115	29.04%
Roman Catholic Church	42	10.61%
Not found out	17	4.29%
Total	396	

In year 2021 was 396 people by religion 204 from Evangelical Church, 115 from None, 42 from Roman Catholic Church, 17 from Not found out, 3 from Jewish community, 3 from Paganism and natural spirituality, 3 from United Methodist Church, 2 from Other, 2 from Greek Catholic Church, 2 from Bahá'i Community, 2 from Ad hoc movements and 1 from Eastern Orthodox Church.
