= Osturňa =

- Municipality
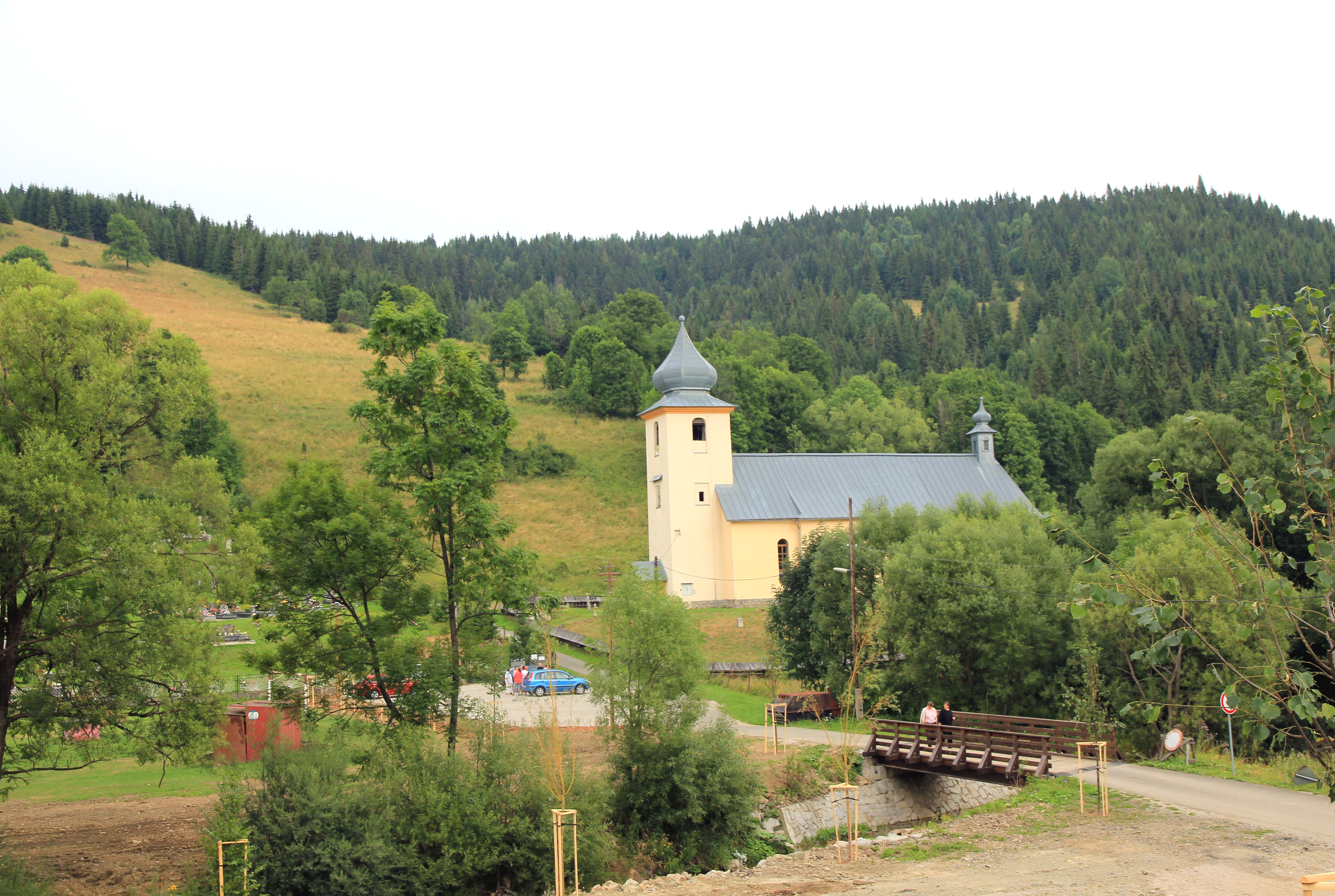
- Church of Saint Michael in Osturňa

- Flag

- Location of Osturňa in the Prešov Region Location of Osturňa in Slovakia
- Coordinates: 49.33°N 20.23°E
- Country: Slovakia
- Region: Prešov Region
- District: Kežmarok District
- First mentioned: 1593

Area
  - Total: 41.24 km^{2} (15.92 sq mi)
- Elevation: 723 m (2,372 ft)

Population (2025)
  - Total: 274
- Time zone: UTC+1 (CET)
  - Summer (DST): UTC+2 (CEST)
- Postal code: 597 9
- Area code: +421 52
- Vehicle registration plate (until 2022): KK
- Website: www.obec-osturna.sk

Osturňa (Hungarian: Osztornya, German: Asthorn, Rusyn: Остурня) is a village and municipality in Kežmarok District in the Prešov Region of north Slovakia. The village was traditionally inhabited by Greek Catholic Rusyns and Gorals, as one of their westernmost settlements (together with Malá Franková and Veľká Franková).

== Geography ==
The municipality lies at an altitude of 723 metres (2,372 ft) and covers an area of 41.24 km^{2} (15.92 sq mi) (2025).

== History ==
In historical records the village was first mentioned in 1593. Before the establishment of independent Czechoslovakia in 1918, Osturňa was part of Szepes County within the Kingdom of Hungary. From 1939 to 1945, it was part of the Slovak Republic. On 27 January 1945, the Red Army dislodged the Wehrmacht from Osturňa in the course of the Western Carpathian offensive and it was once again part of Czechoslovakia.

== Population ==
Population statistic (10 years)
Year	1995	2005	2015	2025
Count	457	397	309	274
Difference		−13.12%	−22.16%	−11.32%

Population statistic
Year	2024	2025
Count	277	274
Difference		−1.08%

It has a population of 274 people (31 December 2025).

=== Ethnicity ===
Census 2021 (1+ %)
Ethnicity	Number	Fraction
Slovak	281	96.89%
Rusyn	33	11.37%
Not found out	4	1.37%
Polish	3	1.03%
Total	290	

In year 2021 was 290 people by ethnicity 281 as Slovak, 33 as Rusyn, 4 as Not found out, 3 as Polish, 2 as Czech and 1 as Russian.

Note on population: The difference values of population numbers in the table "Population statistic" and in the sections "Ethnicity" & "Religion" is caused by the use of various statistical methods.

=== Religion ===
Census 2021 (1+ %)
Religion	Number	Fraction
Greek Catholic Church	242	83.45%
Roman Catholic Church	29	10%
None	14	4.83%
Not found out	5	1.72%
Total	290	

In year 2021 was 290 people by religion 242 from Greek Catholic Church, 29 from Roman Catholic Church, 14 from None and 5 from Not found out.

== Economy ==
Locals in the past had been engaged in agriculture and pasturage. At present its proximity of Ždiar and High Tatras is an asset. Inhabitants work in industrial facilities in Poprad or in recreational facilities in High Tatras. Inside the village are quite a few cottages and chalets for winter or summer holiday rent.
