= Chvojnica, Myjava District =

Chvojnica
- Municipality
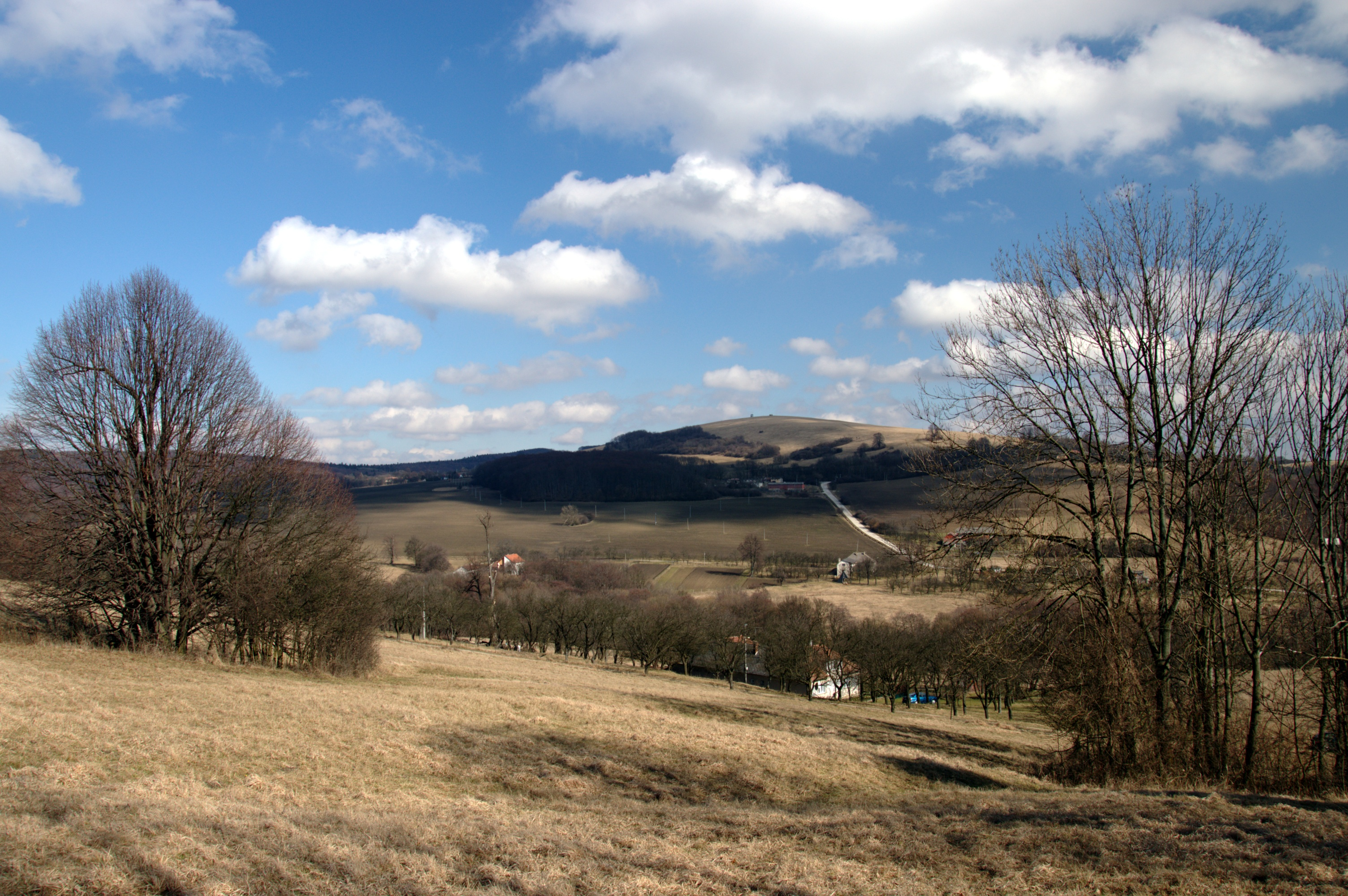

- Flag

- Location of Chvojnica in the Trenčín Region Location of Chvojnica in Slovakia
- Coordinates: 48°47′43″N 17°24′24″E
- Country: Slovakia
- Region: Trenčín Region
- District: Myjava District
- First mentioned: 1957

Area
  - Total: 16.34 km^{2} (6.31 sq mi)
- Elevation: 384 m (1,260 ft)

Population (2025)
  - Total: 317
- Time zone: UTC+1 (CET)
  - Summer (DST): UTC+2 (CEST)
- Postal code: 906 06
- Area code: +421 34
- Vehicle registration plate (until 2022): MY
- Website: www.chvojnica.sk

Chvojnica (Hungarian: Fenyvesd) is a village and municipality in Myjava District in the Trenčín Region of north-western Slovakia.

== History ==
In historical records the village was first mentioned in 1957. Before the establishment of independent Czechoslovakia in 1918, it was part of Nyitra County within the Kingdom of Hungary. From 1939 to 1945, it was part of the Slovak Republic.

== Geography ==
The municipality lies at an altitude of 384 metres (1,260 ft) and covers an area of 16.34 km^{2} (6.31 sq mi) (2025).

== Population ==
Population statistic (10 years)
| Year | 1995 | 2005 | 2015 | 2025 |
|---|---|---|---|---|
| Count | 417 | 394 | 356 | 317 |
| Difference | | −5.51% | −9.64% | −10.95% |

Population statistic
| Year | 2024 | 2025 |
|---|---|---|
| Count | 329 | 317 |
| Difference | | −3.64% |

It has a population of 317 people (31 December 2025).

=== Ethnicity ===
Census 2021 (1+ %)
| Ethnicity | Number | Fraction |
|---|---|---|
| Slovak | 329 | 95.08% |
| Czech | 9 | 2.6% |
| Not found out | 8 | 2.31% |
| Total | 346 | |

In year 2021 was 346 people by ethnicity 329 as Slovak, 9 as Czech, 8 as Not found out, 2 as Hungarian and 1 as Romanian.

Note on population: The difference values of population numbers in the table "Population statistic" and in the sections "Ethnicity" & "Religion" is caused by the use of various statistical methods.

=== Religion ===
Census 2021 (1+ %)
| Religion | Number | Fraction |
|---|---|---|
| Evangelical Church | 258 | 74.57% |
| None | 38 | 10.98% |
| Roman Catholic Church | 29 | 8.38% |
| Not found out | 10 | 2.89% |
| Baptists Church | 6 | 1.73% |
| Total | 346 | |

In year 2021 was 346 people by religion 258 from Evangelical Church, 38 from None, 29 from Roman Catholic Church, 10 from Not found out, 6 from Baptists Church, 1 from Calvinist Church, 1 from Eastern Orthodox Church, 1 from United Methodist Church, 1 from Buddhism and 1 from Ad hoc movements.
