= Poriadie =

- Municipality
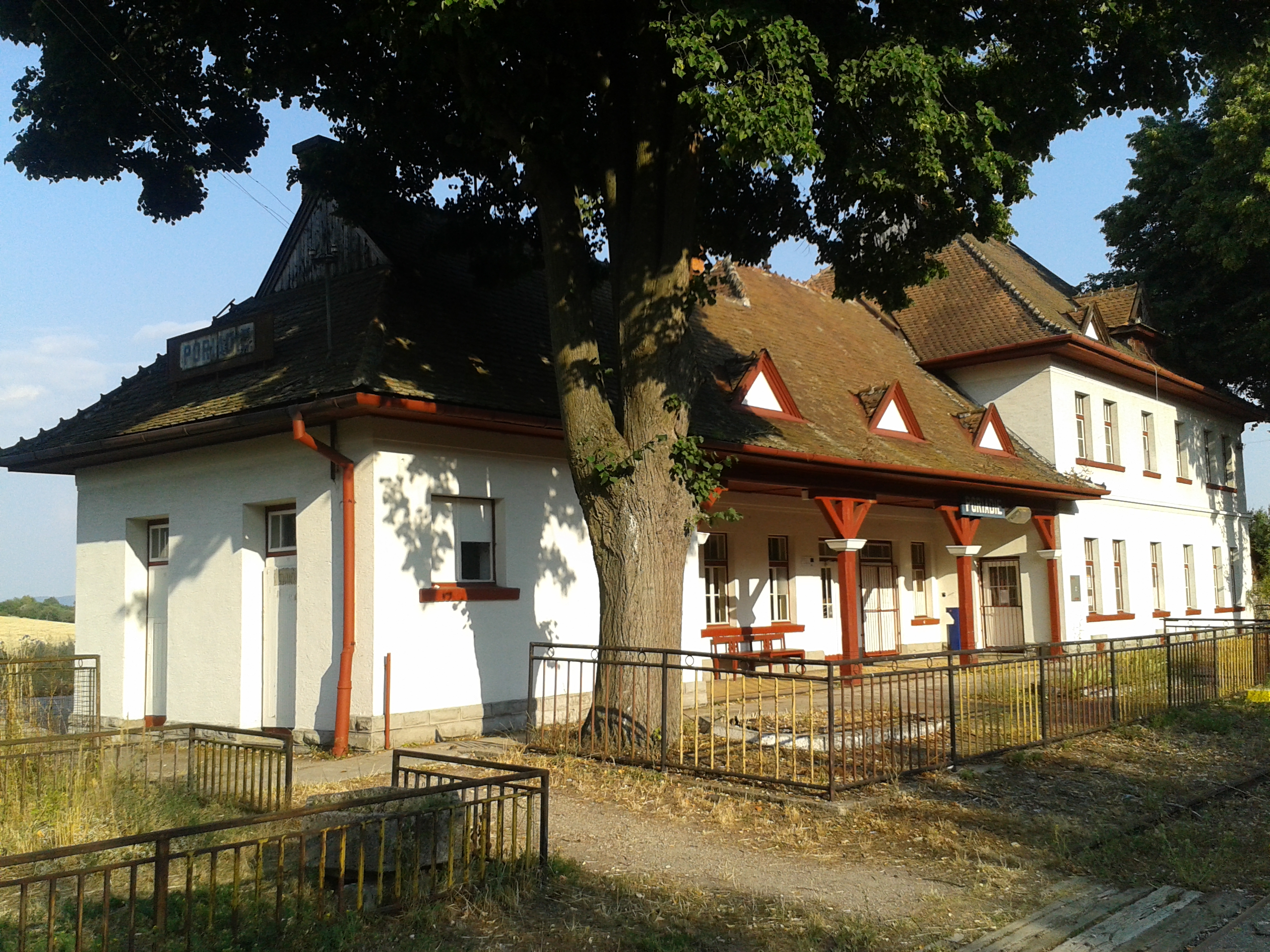
- Railway station

- Flag

- Location of Poriadie in the Trenčín Region Location of Poriadie in Slovakia
- Coordinates: 48.78°N 17.61°E
- Country: Slovakia
- Region: Trenčín Region
- District: Myjava District
- First mentioned: 1955

Area
  - Total: 7.87 km^{2} (3.04 sq mi)
- Elevation: 429 m (1,407 ft)

Population (2025)
  - Total: 709
- Time zone: UTC+1 (CET)
  - Summer (DST): UTC+2 (CEST)
- Postal code: 906 22
- Area code: +421 34
- Vehicle registration plate (until 2022): MY
- Website: www.poriadie.sk

Poriadie (Hungarian: Erdősor) is a village and municipality in Myjava District in the Trenčín Region of north-western Slovakia.

== History ==
In historical records the village was first mentioned in 1955. Before the establishment of independent Czechoslovakia in 1918, it was part of Nyitra County within the Kingdom of Hungary. From 1939 to 1945, it was part of the Slovak Republic.

== Geography ==
The municipality lies at an altitude of 429 metres (1,407 ft) and covers an area of 7.87 km^{2} (3.04 sq mi) (2025).

== Population ==
Population statistic (10 years)
Year	1995	2005	2015	2025
Count	715	692	700	709
Difference		−3.21%	+1.15%	+1.28%

Population statistic
Year	2024	2025
Count	703	709
Difference		+0.85%

It has a population of 709 people (31 December 2025).

=== Ethnicity ===
Census 2021 (1+ %)
Ethnicity	Number	Fraction
Slovak	672	98.53%
Other	8	1.17%
Total	682	

In year 2021 was 682 people by ethnicity 672 as Slovak, 8 as Other, 5 as Czech, 5 as Not found out, 2 as Romani, 2 as Russian, 1 as Jewish, 1 as Vietnamese, 1 as Italian, 1 as Hungarian and 1 as Bulgarian.

Note on population: The difference values of population numbers in the table "Population statistic" and in the sections "Ethnicity" & "Religion" is caused by the use of various statistical methods.

=== Religion ===
Census 2021 (1+ %)
Religion	Number	Fraction
Evangelical Church	364	53.37%
None	255	37.39%
Roman Catholic Church	50	7.33%
Total	682	

In year 2021 was 682 people by religion 364 from Evangelical Church, 255 from None, 50 from Roman Catholic Church, 4 from Greek Catholic Church, 3 from Ad hoc movements, 2 from Not found out, 1 from Paganism and natural spirituality, 1 from Jehovah's Witnesses, 1 from Other and 1 from Buddhism.
