= Stará Myjava =

- Municipality
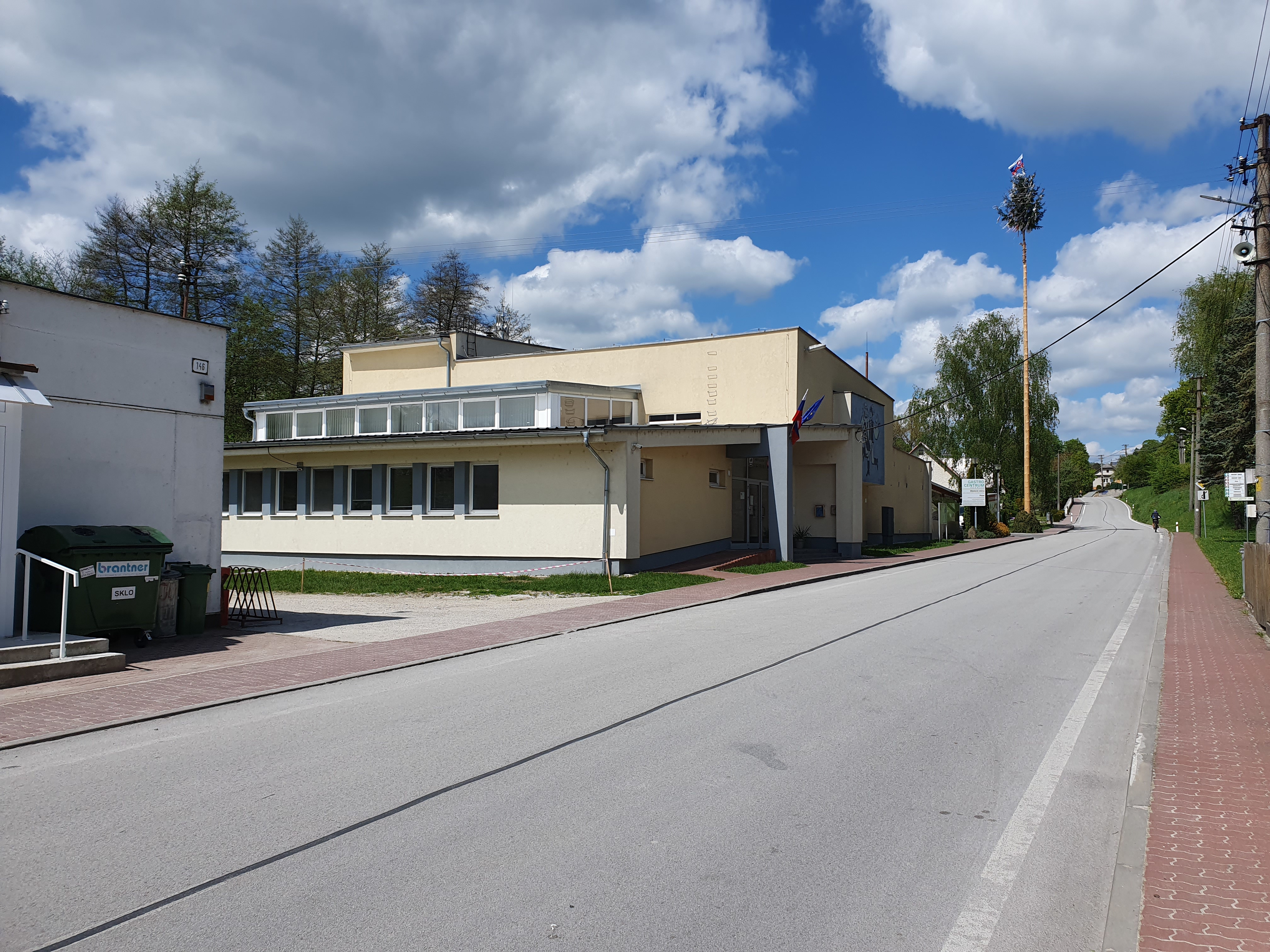

- Flag

- Location of Stará Myjava in the Trenčín Region Location of Stará Myjava in Slovakia
- Coordinates: 48.79°N 17.59°E
- Country: Slovakia
- Region: Trenčín Region
- District: Myjava District
- First mentioned: 1955

Area
  - Total: 17.72 km^{2} (6.84 sq mi)
- Elevation: 390 m (1,280 ft)

Population (2025)
  - Total: 761
- Time zone: UTC+1 (CET)
  - Summer (DST): UTC+2 (CEST)
- Postal code: 907 01
- Area code: +421 34
- Vehicle registration plate (until 2022): MY
- Website: www.staramyjava.sk

Stará Myjava (German: Alt-Miawa, Hungarian: Ómiava) is a village and municipality in Myjava District in the Trenčín Region of north-western Slovakia.

== History ==
In historical records the village was first mentioned in 1955. Before the establishment of independent Czechoslovakia in 1918, it was part of Nyitra County within the Kingdom of Hungary. From 1939 to 1945, it was part of the Slovak Republic.

== Geography ==
The municipality lies at an altitude of 390 metres (1,280 ft) and covers an area of 17.72 km^{2} (6.84 sq mi) (2025).

== Population ==
Population statistic (10 years)
| Year | 1995 | 2005 | 2015 | 2025 |
|---|---|---|---|---|
| Count | 713 | 724 | 742 | 761 |
| Difference | | +1.54% | +2.48% | +2.56% |

Population statistic
| Year | 2024 | 2025 |
|---|---|---|
| Count | 766 | 761 |
| Difference | | −0.65% |

It has a population of 761 people (31 December 2025).

=== Ethnicity ===
Census 2021 (1+ %)
| Ethnicity | Number | Fraction |
|---|---|---|
| Slovak | 741 | 97.24% |
| Not found out | 18 | 2.36% |
| Czech | 9 | 1.18% |
| Total | 762 | |

In year 2021 was 762 people by ethnicity 741 as Slovak, 18 as Not found out, 9 as Czech, 1 as Italian and 1 as French.

Note on population: The difference values of population numbers in the table "Population statistic" and in the sections "Ethnicity" & "Religion" is caused by the use of various statistical methods.

=== Religion ===
Census 2021 (1+ %)
| Religion | Number | Fraction |
|---|---|---|
| Evangelical Church | 416 | 54.59% |
| None | 248 | 32.55% |
| Roman Catholic Church | 47 | 6.17% |
| Not found out | 32 | 4.2% |
| Total | 762 | |

In year 2021 was 762 people by religion 416 from Evangelical Church, 248 from None, 47 from Roman Catholic Church, 32 from Not found out, 4 from Eastern Orthodox Church, 4 from Jehovah's Witnesses, 3 from Ad hoc movements, 2 from Other and not ascertained christian church, 2 from Other, 2 from Greek Catholic Church, 1 from Paganism and natural spirituality and 1 from Buddhism.
