= Kostolné =

- Municipality
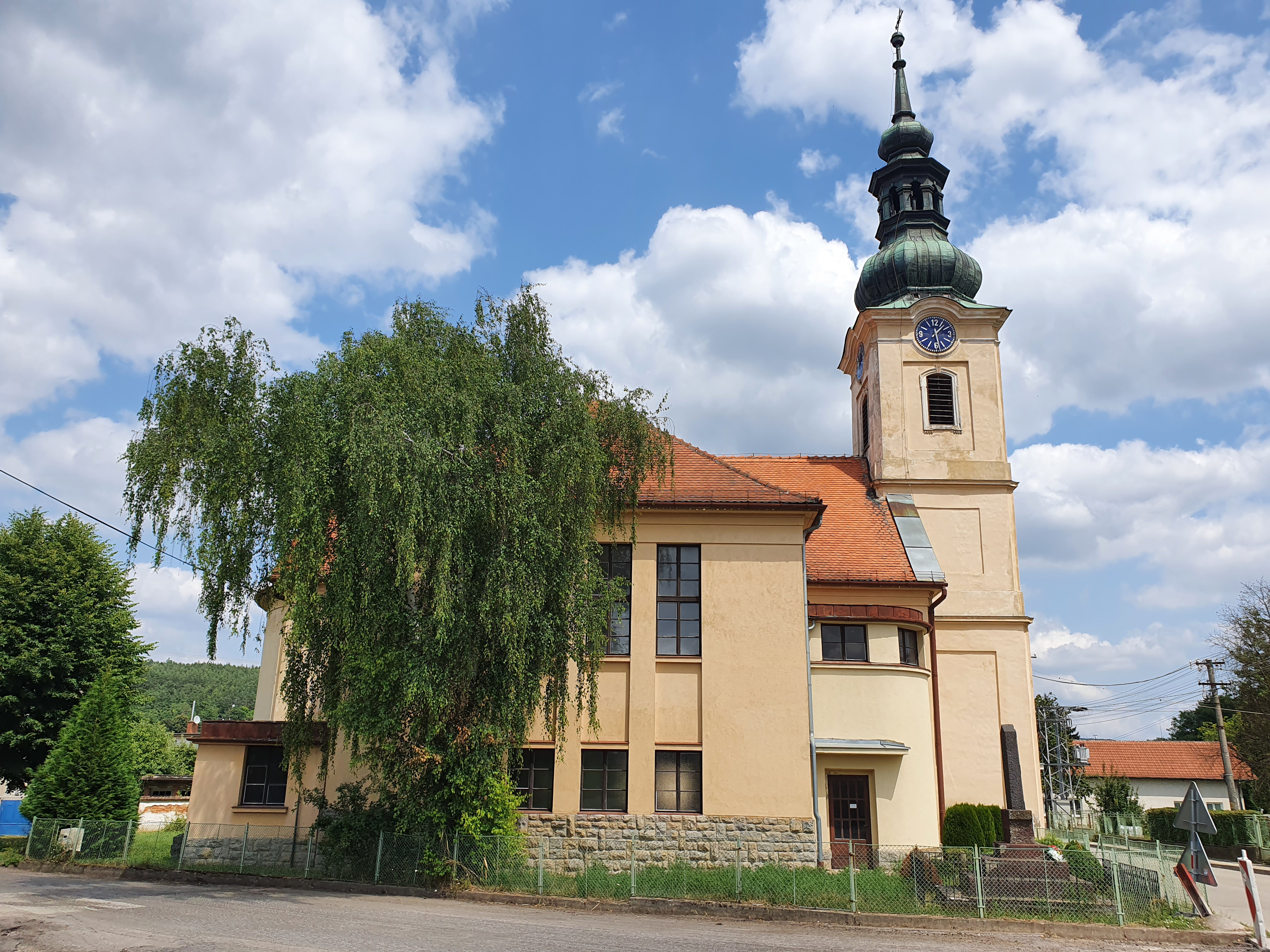
- Lutheran church

- Flag

- Location of Kostolné in the Trenčín Region Location of Kostolné in Slovakia
- Coordinates: 48.73°N 17.71°E
- Country: Slovakia
- Region: Trenčín Region
- District: Myjava District
- First mentioned: 1392

Area
  - Total: 10.10 km^{2} (3.90 sq mi)
- Elevation: 280 m (920 ft)

Population (2025)
  - Total: 617
- Time zone: UTC+1 (CET)
  - Summer (DST): UTC+2 (CEST)
- Postal code: 916 13
- Area code: +421 32
- Vehicle registration plate (until 2022): MY
- Website: obeckostolne.estranky.sk

Kostolné (Hungarian: Nagyegyházas) is a village and municipality in Myjava District in the Trenčín Region of western Slovakia.

== History ==
In historical records the village was first mentioned in 1392. Before the establishment of independent Czechoslovakia in 1918, it was part of Nyitra County within the Kingdom of Hungary. From 1939 to 1945, it was part of the Slovak Republic.

== Geography ==
The municipality lies at an altitude of 280 metres (920 ft) and covers an area of 10.10 km^{2} (3.90 sq mi) (2025).

== Population ==
Population statistic (10 years)
Year	1995	2005	2015	2025
Count	707	640	594	617
Difference		−9.47%	−7.18%	+3.87%

Population statistic
Year	2024	2025
Count	621	617
Difference		−0.64%

It has a population of 617 people (31 December 2025).

=== Ethnicity ===
Census 2021 (1+ %)
Ethnicity	Number	Fraction
Slovak	577	96.48%
Not found out	17	2.84%
Other	6	1%
Total	598	

In year 2021 was 598 people by ethnicity 577 as Slovak, 17 as Not found out, 6 as Other, 4 as Czech, 3 as Austrian, 2 as German, 1 as Moravian and 1 as Hungarian.

Note on population: The difference values of population numbers in the table "Population statistic" and in the sections "Ethnicity" & "Religion" is caused by the use of various statistical methods.

=== Religion ===
Census 2021 (1+ %)
Religion	Number	Fraction
Evangelical Church	244	40.8%
None	211	35.28%
Roman Catholic Church	92	15.38%
Jehovah's Witnesses	19	3.18%
Not found out	19	3.18%
Total	598	

In year 2021 was 598 people by religion 244 from Evangelical Church, 211 from None, 92 from Roman Catholic Church, 19 from Jehovah's Witnesses, 19 from Not found out, 4 from Church of the Brethren, 3 from Greek Catholic Church, 2 from Paganism and natural spirituality, 1 from Hinduism, 1 from Seventh-day Adventist Church, 1 from Buddhism and 1 from Ad hoc movements.

== Genealogical resources ==
The records for genealogical research are available at the state archive "Statny Archiv in Bratislava, Slovakia"

- Lutheran church records (births/marriages/deaths): 1784-1924 (parish A)

== See also ==
- List of municipalities and towns in Slovakia
