= Krajné =

- Municipality
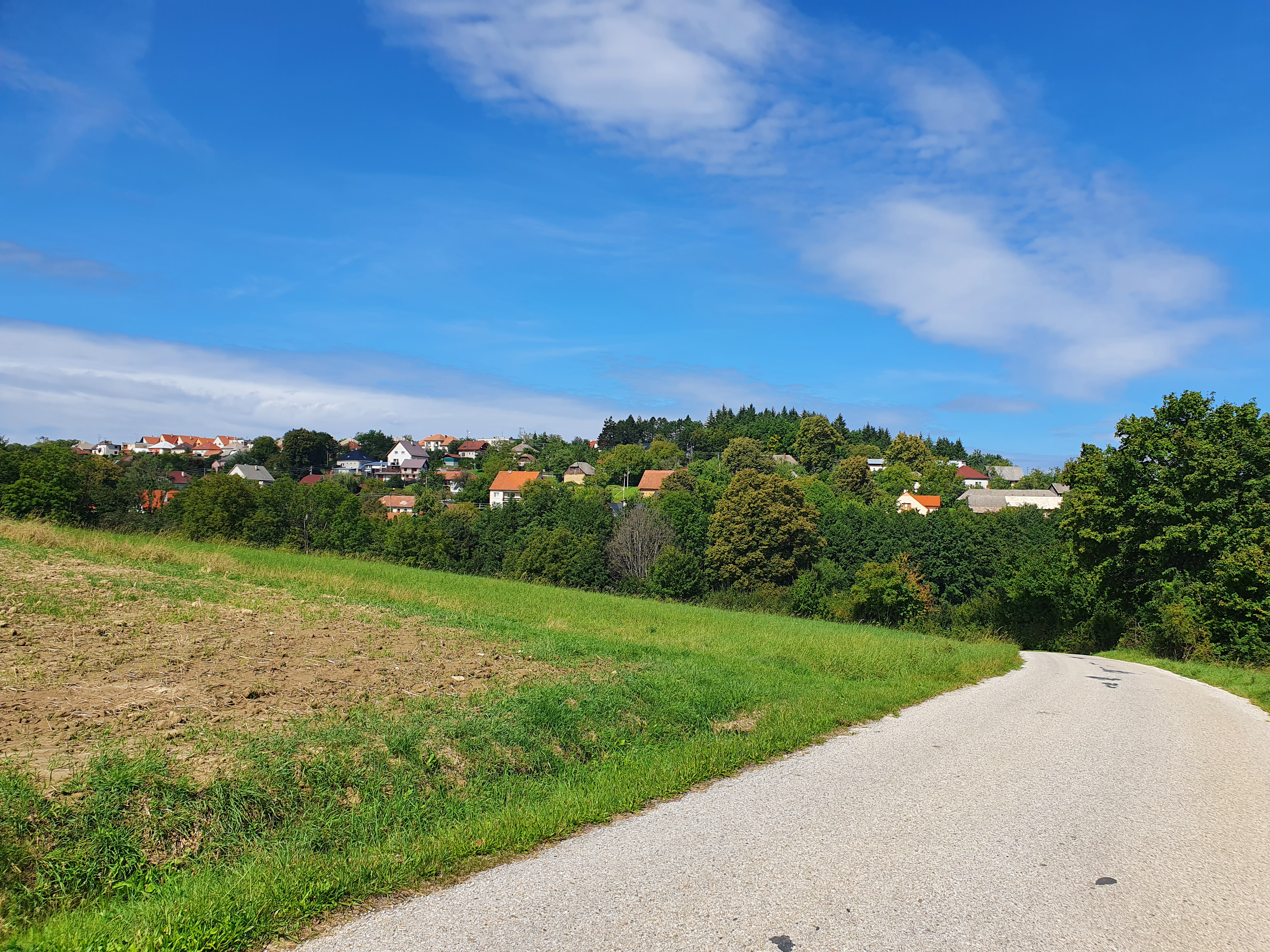

- Flag

- Location of Krajné in the Trenčín Region Location of Krajné in Slovakia
- Coordinates: 48.70°N 17.68°E
- Country: Slovakia
- Region: Trenčín Region
- District: Myjava District
- First mentioned: 1392

Area
  - Total: 26.98 km^{2} (10.42 sq mi)
- Elevation: 267 m (876 ft)

Population (2025)
  - Total: 1,398
- Time zone: UTC+1 (CET)
  - Summer (DST): UTC+2 (CEST)
- Postal code: 916 16
- Area code: +421 32
- Vehicle registration plate (until 2022): MY
- Website: www.krajne.sk

Krajné (Hungarian: Karaj, until 1899 Krajna) is a village and municipality in Myjava District in the Trenčín Region of north-western Slovakia.

== History ==
In historical records the village was first mentioned in 1282. Before the establishment of independent Czechoslovakia in 1918, it was part of Nyitra County within the Kingdom of Hungary. From 1939 to 1945, it was part of the Slovak Republic.

== Geography ==
The municipality lies at an altitude of 267 metres (876 ft) and covers an area of 26.98 km^{2} (10.42 sq mi) (2025).

== Population ==
Population statistic (10 years)
Year	1995	2005	2015	2025
Count	1780	1652	1556	1398
Difference		−7.19%	−5.81%	−10.15%

Population statistic
Year	2024	2025
Count	1405	1398
Difference		−0.49%

It has a population of 1398 people (31 December 2025).

=== Ethnicity ===
Census 2021 (1+ %)
Ethnicity	Number	Fraction
Slovak	1395	97.28%
Not found out	31	2.16%
Total	1434	

In year 2021 was 1434 people by ethnicity 1395 as Slovak, 31 as Not found out, 10 as Romani, 8 as Czech, 8 as Other, 4 as Russian, 1 as Polish, 1 as Moravian and 1 as Hungarian.

Note on population: The difference values of population numbers in the table "Population statistic" and in the sections "Ethnicity" & "Religion" is caused by the use of various statistical methods.

=== Religion ===
Census 2021 (1+ %)
Religion	Number	Fraction
Evangelical Church	839	58.51%
None	319	22.25%
Roman Catholic Church	179	12.48%
Not found out	47	3.28%
Total	1434	

In year 2021 was 1434 people by religion 839 from Evangelical Church, 319 from None, 179 from Roman Catholic Church, 47 from Not found out, 9 from Other and not ascertained christian church, 9 from Other, 8 from Seventh-day Adventist Church, 5 from Jehovah's Witnesses, 5 from Greek Catholic Church, 5 from Ad hoc movements, 3 from Paganism and natural spirituality, 2 from Islam, 2 from United Methodist Church, 1 from Christian Congregations in Slovakia and 1 from Buddhism.
