= Hrašné =

- Municipality
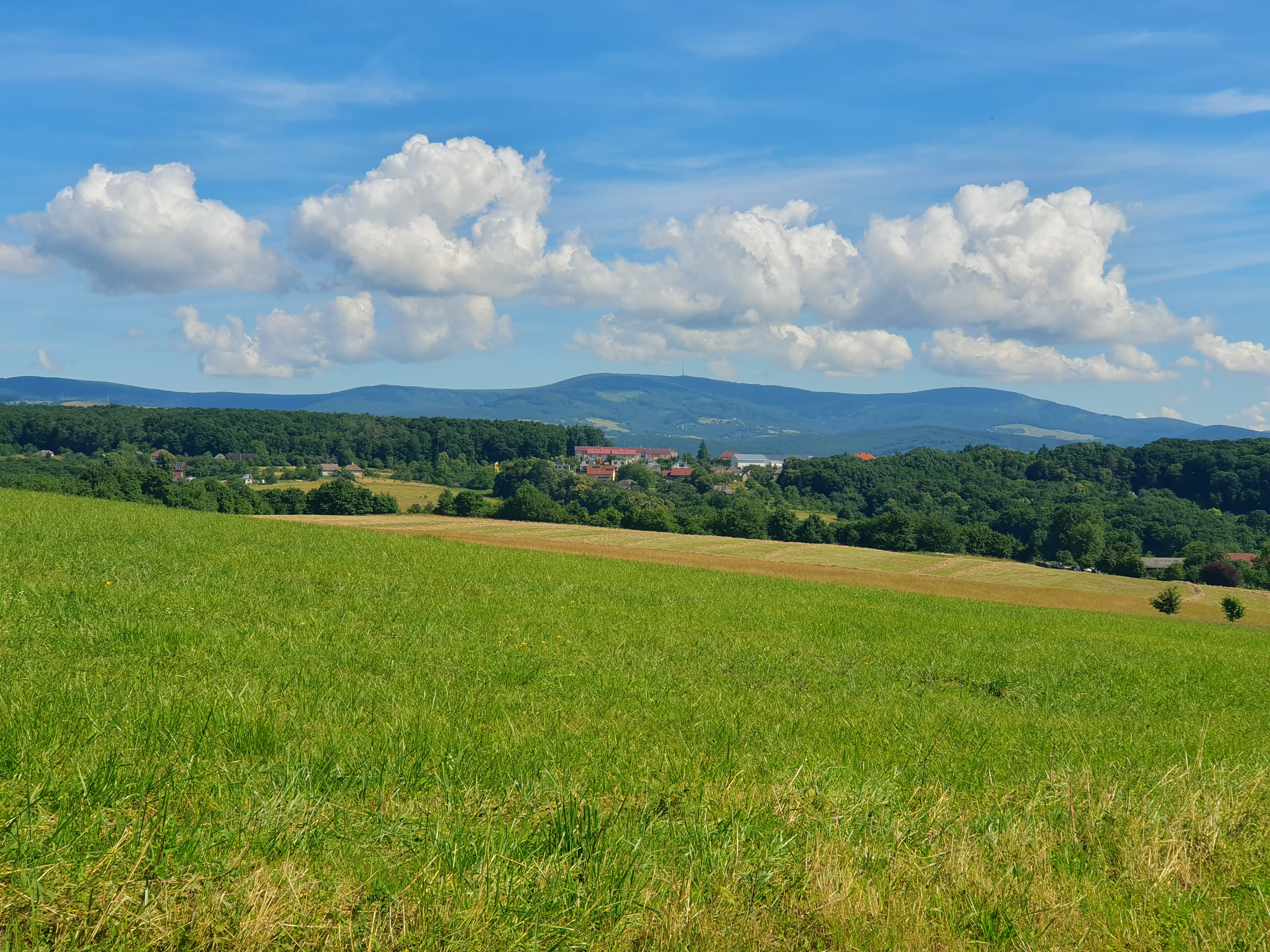

- Flag

- Location of Hrašné in the Trenčín Region Location of Hrašné in Slovakia
- Coordinates: 48.75°N 17.66°E
- Country: Slovakia
- Region: Trenčín Region
- District: Myjava District
- First mentioned: 1955

Area
  - Total: 7.87 km^{2} (3.04 sq mi)
- Elevation: 333 m (1,093 ft)

Population (2025)
  - Total: 465
- Time zone: UTC+1 (CET)
  - Summer (DST): UTC+2 (CEST)
- Postal code: 916 14
- Area code: +421 32
- Vehicle registration plate (until 2022): MY
- Website: www.obechrasne.sk/sk/

Hrašné (Hungarian: Rásnyahegy) is a village and municipality in Myjava District in the Trenčín Region of north-western Slovakia.

== History ==
In historical records the village was first mentioned in 1955. Before the establishment of independent Czechoslovakia in 1918, it was part of Nyitra County within the Kingdom of Hungary. From 1939 to 1945, it was part of the Slovak Republic.

== Geography ==
The municipality lies at an altitude of 333 metres (1,093 ft) and covers an area of 7.87 km^{2} (3.04 sq mi) (2025).

== Population ==
Population statistic (10 years)
Year	1995	2005	2015	2025
Count	524	499	483	465
Difference		−4.77%	−3.20%	−3.72%

Population statistic
Year	2024	2025
Count	480	465
Difference		−3.12%

It has a population of 465 people (31 December 2025).

=== Ethnicity ===
Census 2021 (1+ %)
Ethnicity	Number	Fraction
Slovak	474	98.54%
Czech	9	1.87%
Not found out	6	1.24%
Total	481	

In year 2021 was 481 people by ethnicity 474 as Slovak, 9 as Czech, 6 as Not found out, 2 as Other, 1 as Jewish, 1 as Rusyn, 1 as Russian and 1 as Romanian.

Note on population: The difference values of population numbers in the table "Population statistic" and in the sections "Ethnicity" & "Religion" is caused by the use of various statistical methods.

=== Religion ===
Census 2021 (1+ %)
Religion	Number	Fraction
Evangelical Church	217	45.11%
None	214	44.49%
Roman Catholic Church	27	5.61%
Jehovah's Witnesses	10	2.08%
Total	481	

In year 2021 was 481 people by religion 217 from Evangelical Church, 214 from None, 27 from Roman Catholic Church, 10 from Jehovah's Witnesses, 4 from Not found out, 3 from Greek Catholic Church, 2 from Ad hoc movements, 1 from Christian Congregations in Slovakia, 1 from Hinduism, 1 from United Methodist Church and 1 from Buddhism.
