= Podkylava =

- Municipality
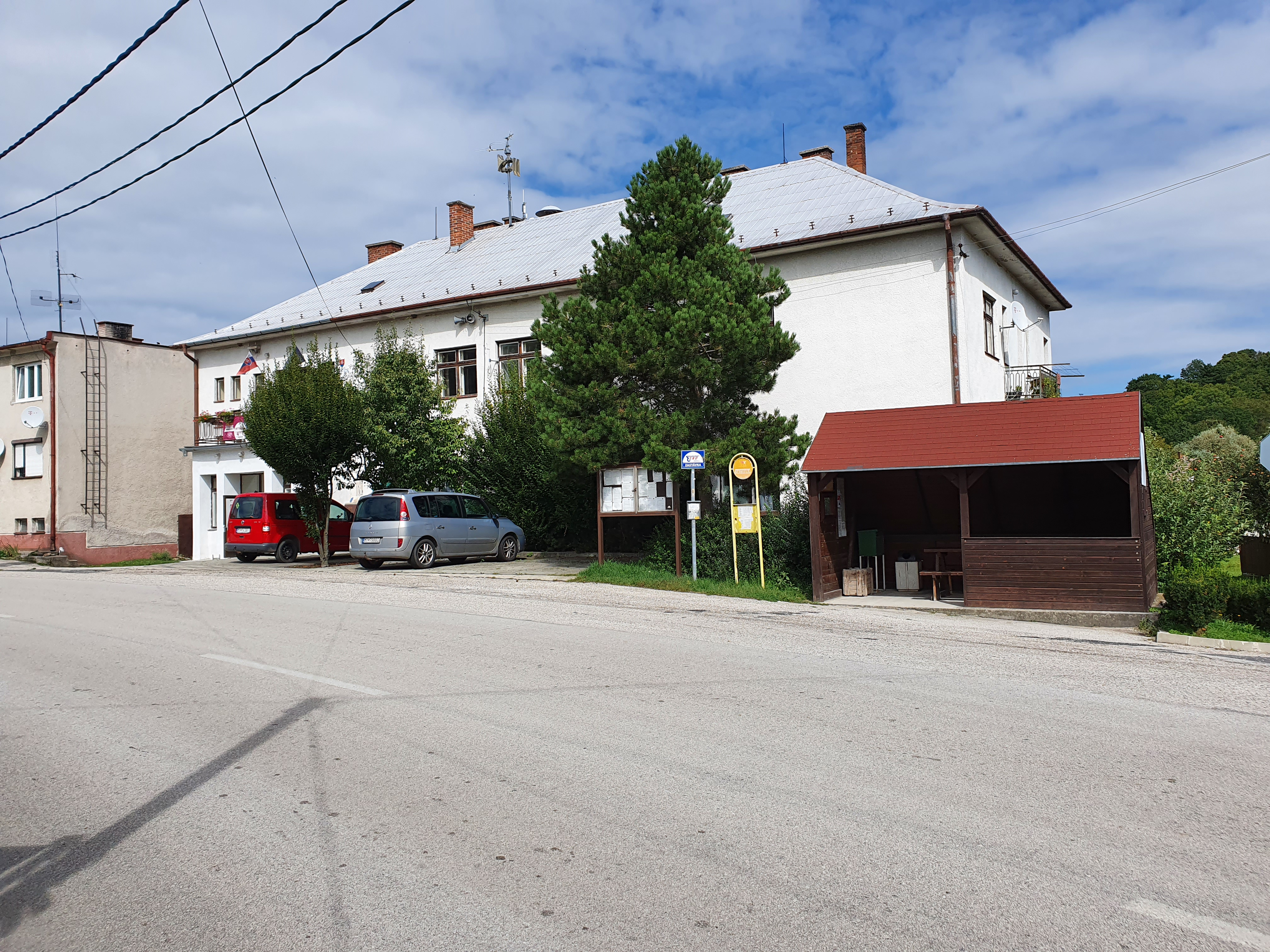

- Flag

- Location of Podkylava in the Trenčín Region Location of Podkylava in Slovakia
- Coordinates: 48.68°N 17.67°E
- Country: Slovakia
- Region: Trenčín Region
- District: Myjava District
- First mentioned: 1709

Area
  - Total: 9.95 km^{2} (3.84 sq mi)
- Elevation: 246 m (807 ft)

Population (2025)
  - Total: 239
- Time zone: UTC+1 (CET)
  - Summer (DST): UTC+2 (CEST)
- Postal code: 916 16
- Area code: +421 32
- Vehicle registration plate (until 2022): MY
- Website: podkylava.sk

Podkylava (Hungarian: Szakadék) is a village and municipality in Myjava District in the Trenčín Region of north-western Slovakia.

== History ==
In historical records, the village was first mentioned in 1709. Before the establishment of independent Czechoslovakia in 1918, it was part of Nyitra County within the Kingdom of Hungary. From 1939 to 1945, it was part of the Slovak Republic.

== Geography ==
The municipality lies at an altitude of 246 metres (807 ft) and covers an area of 9.95 km^{2} (3.84 sq mi) (2025).

== Population ==
Population statistic (10 years)
Year	1995	2005	2015	2025
Count	316	246	225	239
Difference		−22.15%	−8.53%	+6.22%

Population statistic
Year	2024	2025
Count	244	239
Difference		−2.04%

It has a population of 239 people (31 December 2025).

=== Ethnicity ===
Census 2021 (1+ %)
Ethnicity	Number	Fraction
Slovak	215	93.47%
Not found out	13	5.65%
Czech	3	1.3%
Other	3	1.3%
Total	230	

In year 2021 was 230 people by ethnicity 215 as Slovak, 13 as Not found out, 3 as Czech, 3 as Other, 2 as Russian and 1 as Rusyn.

Note on population: The difference values of population numbers in the table "Population statistic" and in the sections "Ethnicity" & "Religion" is caused by the use of various statistical methods.

=== Religion ===
Census 2021 (1+ %)
Religion	Number	Fraction
Evangelical Church	115	50%
None	64	27.83%
Roman Catholic Church	28	12.17%
Not found out	18	7.83%
Total	230	

In year 2021 was 230 people by religion 115 from Evangelical Church, 64 from None, 28 from Roman Catholic Church, 18 from Not found out, 2 from Buddhism, 1 from Jehovah's Witnesses, 1 from Other and 1 from Greek Catholic Church.
