= Veľká Franková =

- Municipality
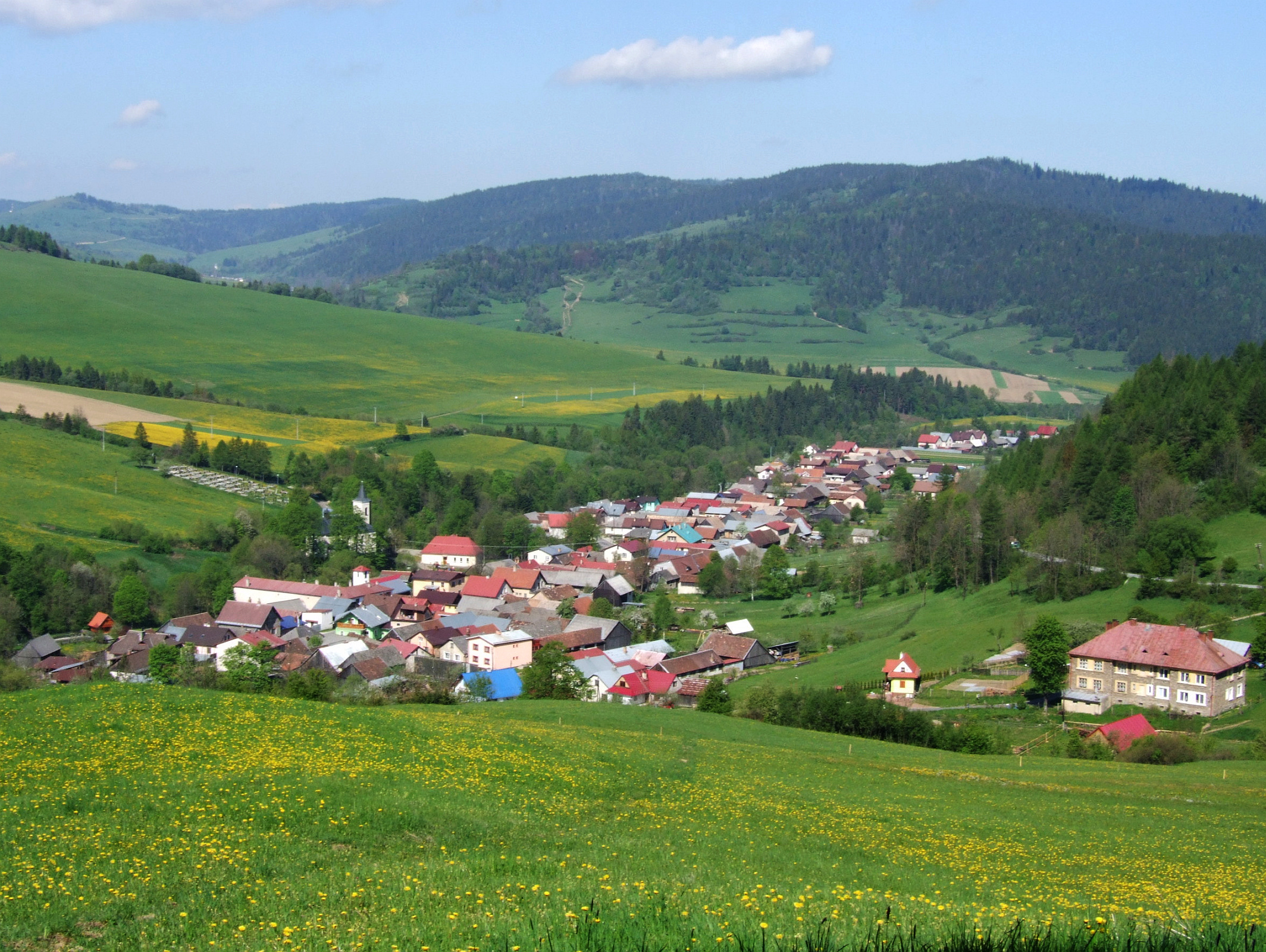

- Flag

- Location of Veľká Franková in the Prešov Region Location of Veľká Franková in Slovakia
- Coordinates: 49.33°N 20.30°E
- Country: Slovakia
- Region: Prešov Region
- District: Kežmarok District
- First mentioned: 1296

Area
  - Total: 10.63 km^{2} (4.10 sq mi)
- Elevation: 658 m (2,159 ft)

Population (2025)
  - Total: 327
- Time zone: UTC+1 (CET)
  - Summer (DST): UTC+2 (CEST)
- Postal code: 597 8
- Area code: +421 52
- Vehicle registration plate (until 2022): KK
- Website: www.velkafrankova.sk

Veľká Franková (Hungarian: Nagyfrankvágása, German: Großfrankenau, Rusyn: Велька Франкова) is a village and municipality in Kežmarok District in the Prešov Region of north Slovakia. The village is traditionally inhabited by Rusyns, as one of their westernmost settlements (together with Malá Franková and Osturňa).

== History ==
In historical records the village was first mentioned in 1296. Before the establishment of independent Czechoslovakia in 1918, Veľká Franková was part of Szepes County within the Kingdom of Hungary. From 1939 to 1945, it was part of the Slovak Republic. On 27 January 1945, the Red Army dislodged the Wehrmacht from Veľká Franková in the course of the Western Carpathian offensive and it was once again part of Czechoslovakia.

== Geography ==
The municipality lies at an altitude of 658 metres (2,159 ft) and covers an area of 10.63 km^{2} (4.10 sq mi) (2025).

== Population ==
Population statistic (10 years)
| Year | 1995 | 2005 | 2015 | 2025 |
|---|---|---|---|---|
| Count | 360 | 367 | 345 | 327 |
| Difference | | +1.94% | −5.99% | −5.21% |

Population statistic
| Year | 2024 | 2025 |
|---|---|---|
| Count | 333 | 327 |
| Difference | | −1.80% |

It has a population of 327 people (31 December 2025).

=== Ethnicity ===
Census 2021 (1+ %)
| Ethnicity | Number | Fraction |
|---|---|---|
| Slovak | 336 | 98.82% |
| Not found out | 102 | 30% |
| Total | 340 | |

In year 2021 was 340 people by ethnicity 336 as Slovak, 102 as Not found out, 3 as Polish, 1 as Russian, 1 as Austrian and 1 as Other.

Note on population: The difference values of population numbers in the table "Population statistic" and in the sections "Ethnicity" & "Religion" is caused by the use of various statistical methods.

=== Religion ===
Census 2021 (1+ %)
| Religion | Number | Fraction |
|---|---|---|
| Roman Catholic Church | 317 | 93.24% |
| None | 9 | 2.65% |
| Greek Catholic Church | 5 | 1.47% |
| Total | 340 | |

In year 2021 was 340 people by religion 317 from Roman Catholic Church, 9 from None, 5 from Greek Catholic Church, 2 from Other and not ascertained christian church, 2 from Not found out, 2 from Baptists Church, 1 from Eastern Orthodox Church, 1 from Evangelical Church and 1 from Ad hoc movements.
