= Priepasné =

- Municipality
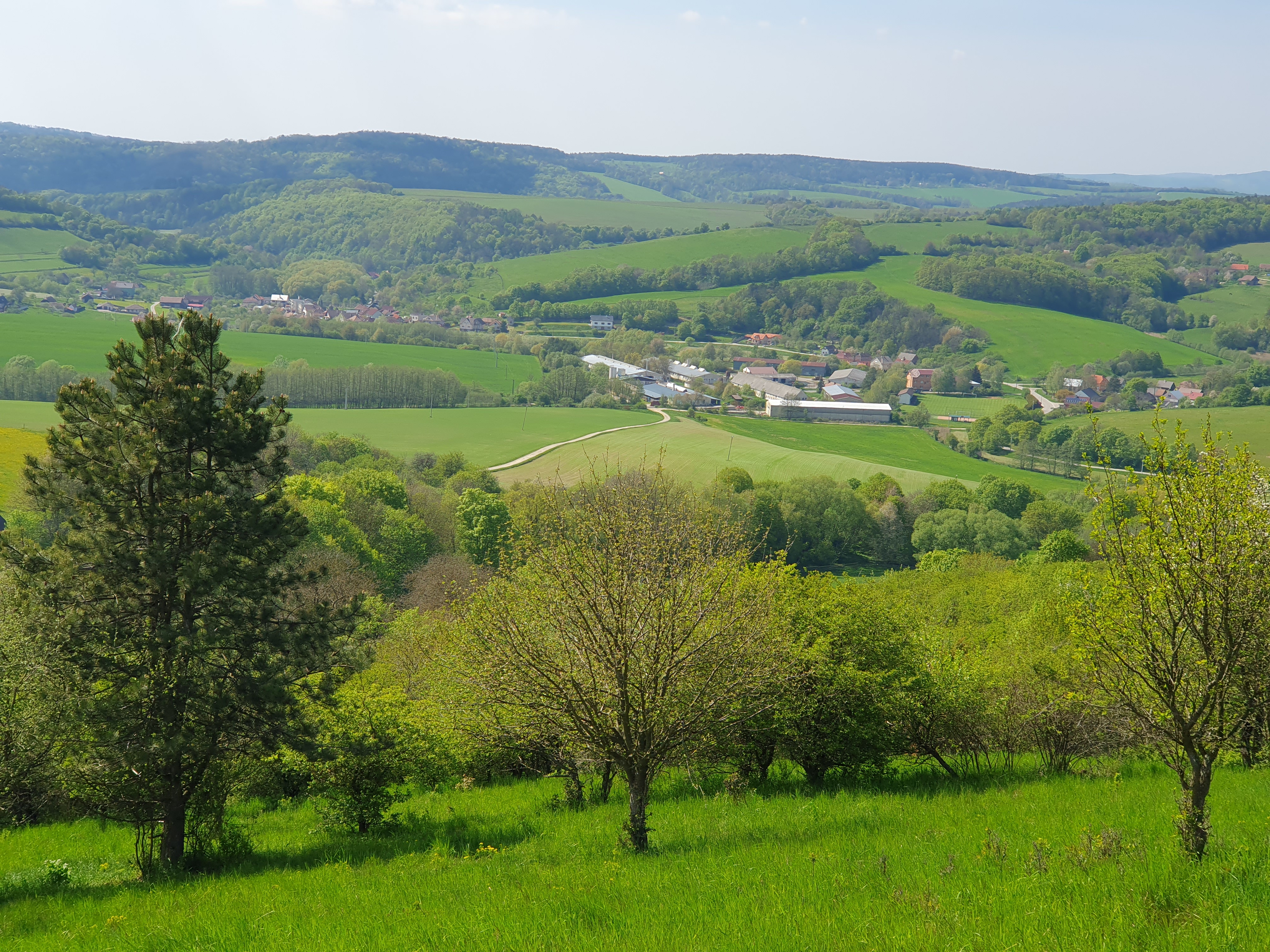

- Flag

- Location of Priepasné in the Trenčín Region Location of Priepasné in Slovakia
- Coordinates: 48.69°N 17.59°E
- Country: Slovakia
- Region: Trenčín Region
- District: Myjava District
- First mentioned: 1957

Area
  - Total: 13.70 km^{2} (5.29 sq mi)
- Elevation: 343 m (1,125 ft)

Population (2025)
  - Total: 345
- Time zone: UTC+1 (CET)
  - Summer (DST): UTC+2 (CEST)
- Postal code: 906 15
- Area code: +421 34
- Vehicle registration plate (until 2022): MY
- Website: www.priepasne.sk/en/Home.alej

Priepasné (Hungarian: Hosszúhegy) is a village and municipality in Myjava District in the Trenčín Region of north-western Slovakia.

== History ==
In historical records the village was first mentioned in 1957. Before the establishment of independent Czechoslovakia in 1918, it was part of Nyitra County within the Kingdom of Hungary. From 1939 to 1945, it was part of the Slovak Republic.

== Geography ==
The municipality lies at an altitude of 343 metres (1,125 ft) and covers an area of 13.70 km^{2} (5.29 sq mi) (2025).

== Population ==
Population statistic (10 years)
Year	1995	2005	2015	2025
Count	416	345	379	345
Difference		−17.06%	+9.85%	−8.97%

Population statistic
Year	2024	2025
Count	350	345
Difference		−1.42%

It has a population of 345 people (31 December 2025).

=== Ethnicity ===
Census 2021 (1+ %)
Ethnicity	Number	Fraction
Slovak	341	96.32%
Czech	5	1.41%
Total	354	

In year 2021 was 354 people by ethnicity 341 as Slovak, 5 as Czech, 3 as Rusyn, 3 as Not found out, 2 as Ukrainian, 2 as Romani, 2 as Russian, 2 as Other, 1 as Polish and 1 as Hungarian.

Note on population: The difference values of population numbers in the table "Population statistic" and in the sections "Ethnicity" & "Religion" is caused by the use of various statistical methods.

=== Religion ===
Census 2021 (1+ %)
Religion	Number	Fraction
Evangelical Church	218	61.58%
None	85	24.01%
Roman Catholic Church	37	10.45%
Eastern Orthodox Church	6	1.69%
Total	354	

In year 2021 was 354 people by religion 218 from Evangelical Church, 85 from None, 37 from Roman Catholic Church, 6 from Eastern Orthodox Church, 3 from Not found out, 3 from Ad hoc movements, 1 from Other and not ascertained christian church and 1 from United Methodist Church.
