= Malá Franková =

- Municipality
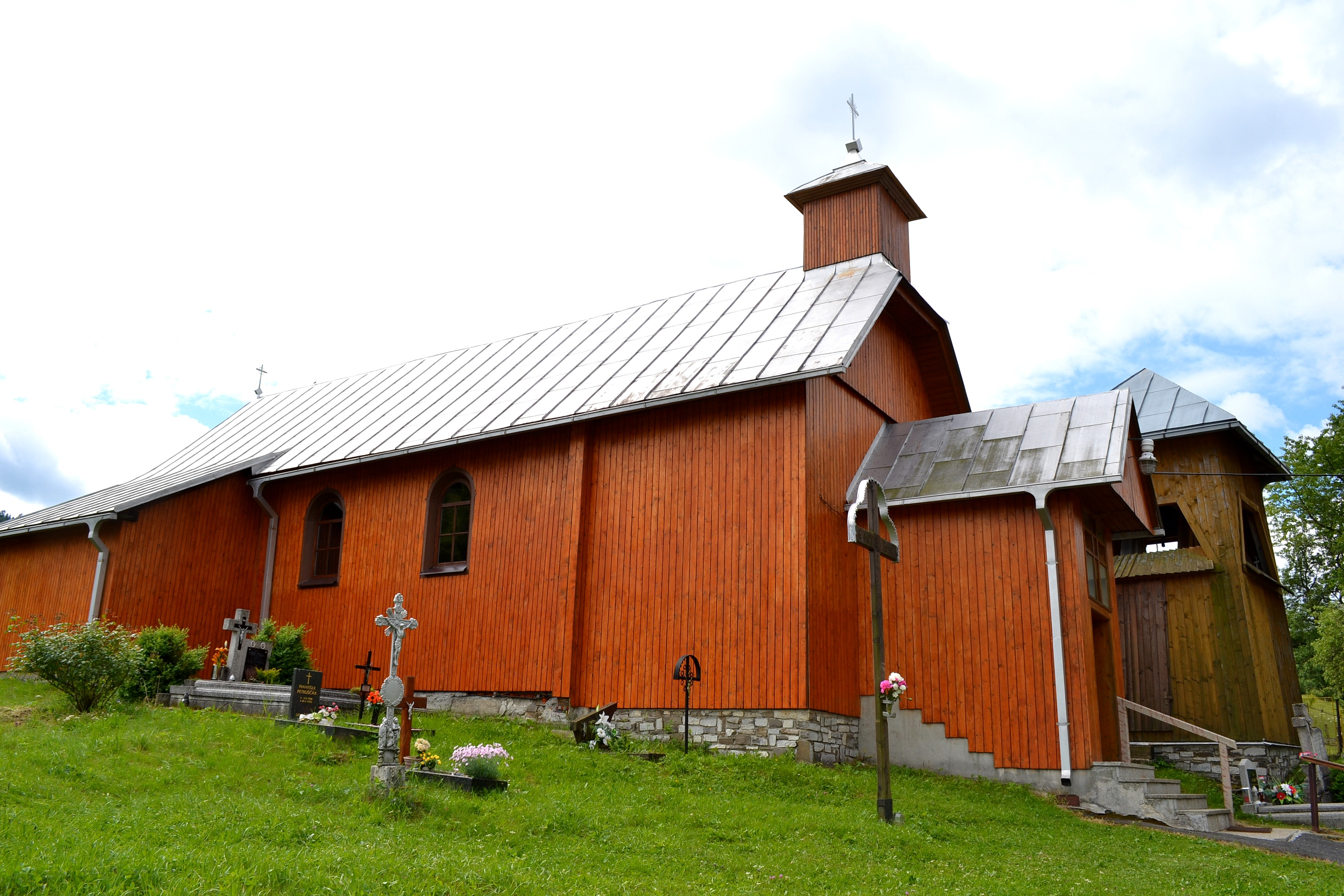
- Saint Joseph church

- Flag

- Location of Malá Franková in the Prešov Region Location of Malá Franková in Slovakia
- Coordinates: 49.32°N 20.30°E
- Country: Slovakia
- Region: Prešov Region
- District: Kežmarok District
- First mentioned: 1568

Area
  - Total: 10.80 km^{2} (4.17 sq mi)
- Elevation: 750 m (2,460 ft)

Population (2025)
  - Total: 193
- Time zone: UTC+1 (CET)
  - Summer (DST): UTC+2 (CEST)
- Postal code: 597 8
- Area code: +421 52
- Vehicle registration plate (until 2022): KK
- Website: www.malafrankova.dcom.sk

Malá Franková (Hungarian: Kisfrankvágása, German: Kleinfrankenau, Rusyn: Мала Франкова) is a village and municipality in the Kežmarok District of the Prešov Region of north Slovakia. It is traditionally inhabited by Gorals, as one of their westernmost settlements (along with Veľká Franková and Osturňa).

== History ==
Historical records first mention the village in 1568. Before the establishment of independent Czechoslovakia in 1918, Malá Franková was part of Szepes County within the Kingdom of Hungary. From 1939 to 1945, it was part of the Slovak Republic. On 27 January 1945, the Red Army dislodged the Wehrmacht from Malá Franková in the course of the Western Carpathian offensive and it was once again part of Czechoslovakia.

== Geography ==
The municipality lies at an altitude of 750 metres (2,460 ft) and covers an area of 10.80 km^{2} (4.17 sq mi) (2025).

== Population ==
Population statistic (10 years)
Year	1995	2005	2015	2025
Count	191	191	183	193
Difference		+0%	−4.18%	+5.46%

Population statistic
Year	2024	2025
Count	194	193
Difference		−0.51%

It has a population of 193 people (31 December 2025).

=== Ethnicity ===
Census 2021 (1+ %)
Ethnicity	Number	Fraction
Slovak	183	98.91%
Not found out	36	19.45%
Polish	6	3.24%
Czech	2	1.08%
Total	185	

In year 2021 was 185 people by ethnicity 183 as Slovak, 36 as Not found out, 6 as Polish, 2 as Czech and 1 as Other.

Note on population: The difference values of population numbers in the table "Population statistic" and in the sections "Ethnicity" & "Religion" is caused by the use of various statistical methods.

=== Religion ===
Census 2021 (1+ %)
Religion	Number	Fraction
Roman Catholic Church	173	93.51%
Greek Catholic Church	4	2.16%
None	4	2.16%
Evangelical Church	2	1.08%
Total	185	

In year 2021 was 185 people by religion 173 from Roman Catholic Church, 4 from Greek Catholic Church, 4 from None, 2 from Evangelical Church, 1 from Eastern Orthodox Church and 1 from Ad hoc movements.

== Notable people ==
- Ján Vosček (* 1924 – † 2015) - Slovak politician and justice of the Constitutional Court of the Czech and Slovak Federal Republic
