= Bukovec, Myjava District =

Bukovec
- Municipality
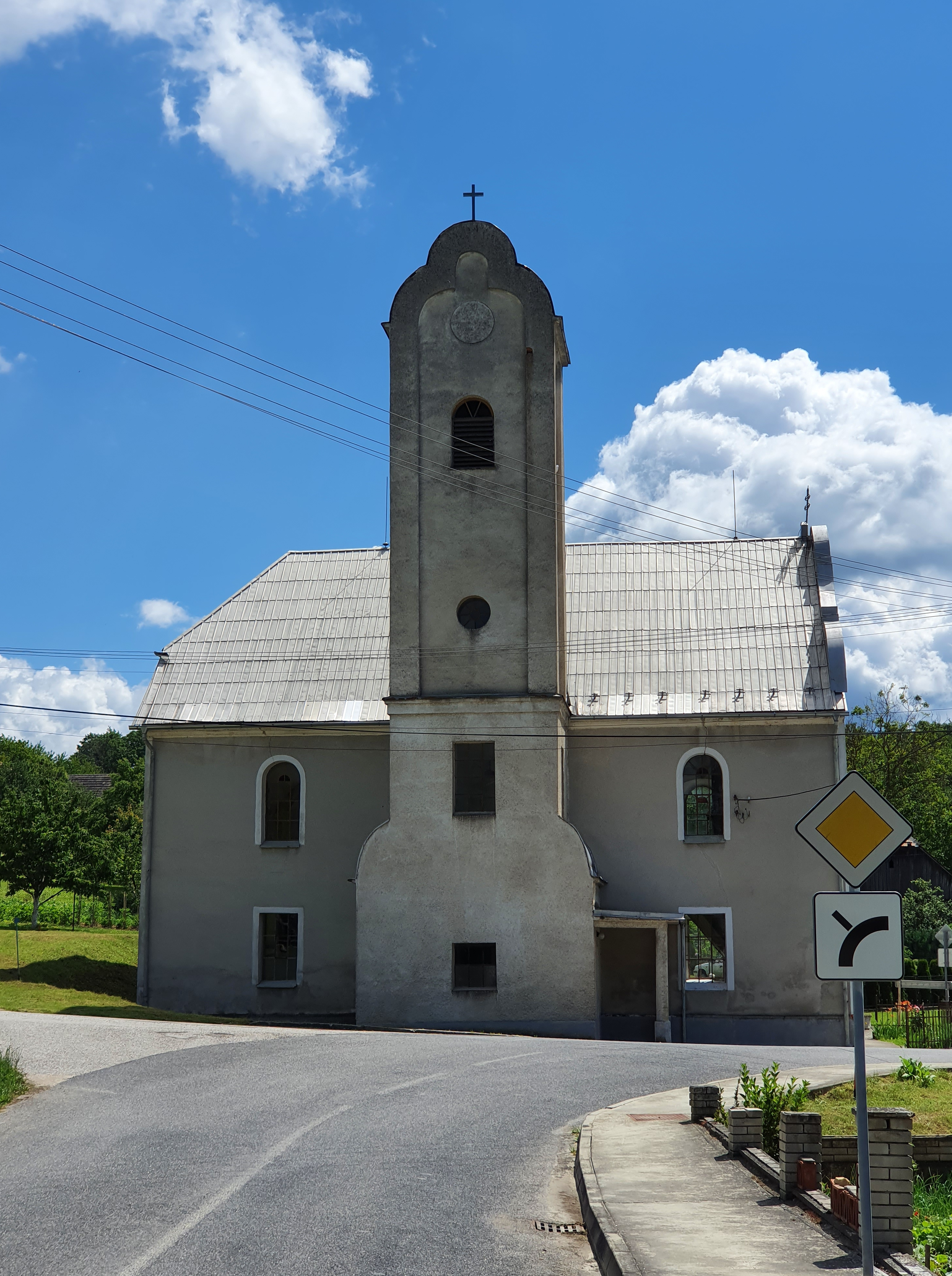

- Flag

- Location of Bukovec in the Trenčín Region Location of Bukovec in Slovakia
- Coordinates: 48.694°N 17.500°E
- Country: Slovakia
- Region: Trenčín Region
- District: Myjava District
- First mentioned: 1609

Area
  - Total: 15.46 km^{2} (5.97 sq mi)
- Elevation: 360 m (1,180 ft)

Population (2025)
  - Total: 418
- Time zone: UTC+1 (CET)
  - Summer (DST): UTC+2 (CEST)
- Postal code: 906 14
- Area code: +421 34
- Vehicle registration plate (until 2022): MY
- Website: www.bukovec.eu

Bukovec (German: Bukowetz; Hungarian: Berencsbukóc) is a village and municipality in Myjava District in the Trenčín Region of north-western Slovakia.

== History ==
In historical records the village was first mentioned in 1609. Before the establishment of independent Czechoslovakia in 1918, it was part of Nyitra County within the Kingdom of Hungary. From 1939 to 1945, it was part of the Slovak Republic.

== Geography ==
The municipality lies at an altitude of 360 metres (1,180 ft) and covers an area of 15.46 km^{2} (5.97 sq mi) (2025).

== Population ==
Population statistic (10 years)
Year	1995	2005	2015	2025
Count	454	404	425	418
Difference		−11.01%	+5.19%	−1.64%

Population statistic
Year	2024	2025
Count	424	418
Difference		−1.41%

It has a population of 418 people (31 December 2025).

=== Ethnicity ===
Census 2021 (1+ %)
Ethnicity	Number	Fraction
Slovak	418	96.98%
Czech	6	1.39%
Not found out	6	1.39%
Total	431	

In year 2021 was 431 people by ethnicity 418 as Slovak, 6 as Czech, 6 as Not found out, 2 as Hungarian, 2 as Other, 1 as Vietnamese, 1 as Ukrainian, 1 as Rusyn, 1 as Polish and 1 as Albanian.

Note on population: The difference values of population numbers in the table "Population statistic" and in the sections "Ethnicity" & "Religion" is caused by the use of various statistical methods.

=== Religion ===
Census 2021 (1+ %)
Religion	Number	Fraction
Evangelical Church	231	53.6%
None	130	30.16%
Roman Catholic Church	59	13.69%
Not found out	6	1.39%
Total	431	

In year 2021 was 431 people by religion 231 from Evangelical Church, 130 from None, 59 from Roman Catholic Church, 6 from Not found out, 1 from Eastern Orthodox Church, 1 from Islam, 1 from Other, 1 from Czechoslovak Hussite Church and 1 from Buddhism.

== Genealogical resources ==
The records for genealogical research are available at the state archive "Statny Archiv in Bratislava, Slovakia"

- Roman Catholic church records (births/marriages/deaths): 1730-1952 (parish B)
- Lutheran church records (births/marriages/deaths): 1733-1949 (parish A)

== See also ==
- List of municipalities and towns in Slovakia
