= Rudník, Myjava District =

Rudník
- Municipality
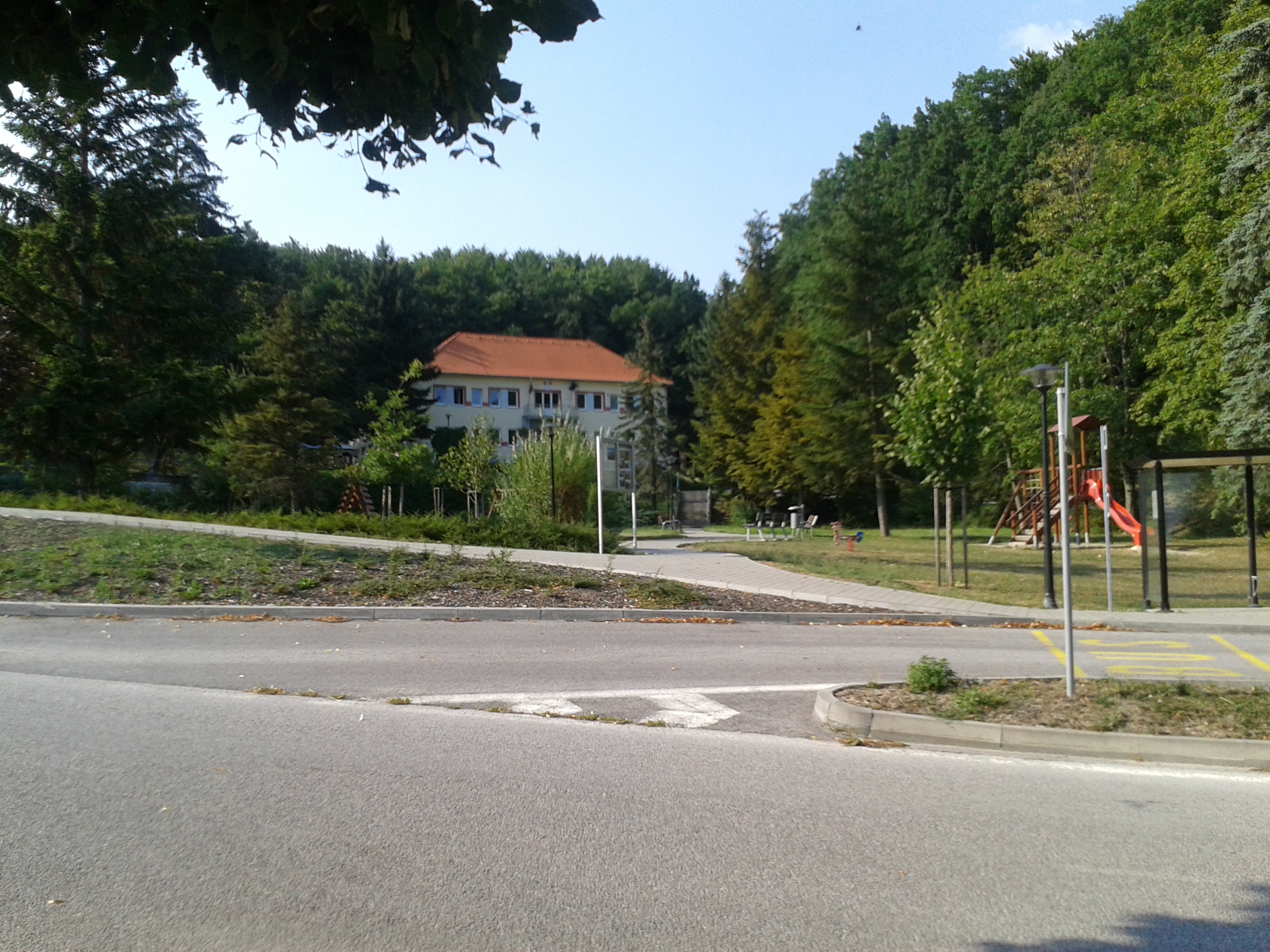

- Flag

- Location of Rudník in the Trenčín Region Location of Rudník in Slovakia
- Coordinates: 48°45′26″N 17°38′57″E
- Country: Slovakia
- Region: Trenčín Region
- District: Myjava District
- First mentioned: 1955

Area
  - Total: 9.38 km^{2} (3.62 sq mi)
- Elevation: 345 m (1,132 ft)

Population (2025)
  - Total: 827
- Time zone: UTC+1 (CET)
  - Summer (DST): UTC+2 (CEST)
- Postal code: 906 23
- Area code: +421 34
- Vehicle registration plate (until 2022): MY
- Website: www.rudnik.sk

Rudník is a village and municipality in Myjava District in the Trenčín Region of north-western Slovakia.

== History ==
In historical records the village was first mentioned in 1955. Before the establishment of independent Czechoslovakia in 1918, it was part of Nyitra County within the Kingdom of Hungary. From 1939 to 1945, it was part of the Slovak Republic.

== Geography ==
The municipality lies at an altitude of 345 metres (1,132 ft) and covers an area of 9.38 km^{2} (3.62 sq mi) (2025).

== Population ==
Population statistic (10 years)
Year	1995	2005	2015	2025
Count	861	736	808	827
Difference		−14.51%	+9.78%	+2.35%

Population statistic
Year	2024	2025
Count	838	827
Difference		−1.31%

It has a population of 827 people (31 December 2025).

=== Ethnicity ===
Census 2021 (1+ %)
Ethnicity	Number	Fraction
Slovak	804	98.4%
Not found out	11	1.34%
Total	817	

In year 2021 was 817 people by ethnicity 804 as Slovak, 11 as Not found out, 5 as Czech, 1 as Ukrainian, 1 as Turkish, 1 as German and 1 as Bulgarian.

Note on population: The difference values of population numbers in the table "Population statistic" and in the sections "Ethnicity" & "Religion" is caused by the use of various statistical methods.

=== Religion ===
Census 2021 (1+ %)
Religion	Number	Fraction
Evangelical Church	376	46.02%
None	336	41.13%
Roman Catholic Church	51	6.24%
Jehovah's Witnesses	16	1.96%
Not found out	14	1.71%
Total	817	

In year 2021 was 817 people by religion 376 from Evangelical Church, 336 from None, 51 from Roman Catholic Church, 16 from Jehovah's Witnesses, 14 from Not found out, 7 from Apostolic Church, 4 from Eastern Orthodox Church, 3 from Islam, 3 from Other, 3 from United Methodist Church, 2 from Ad hoc movements, 1 from Buddhism and 1 from Bahá'i Community.
