= Brestovec, Myjava District =

Brestovec
- Municipality
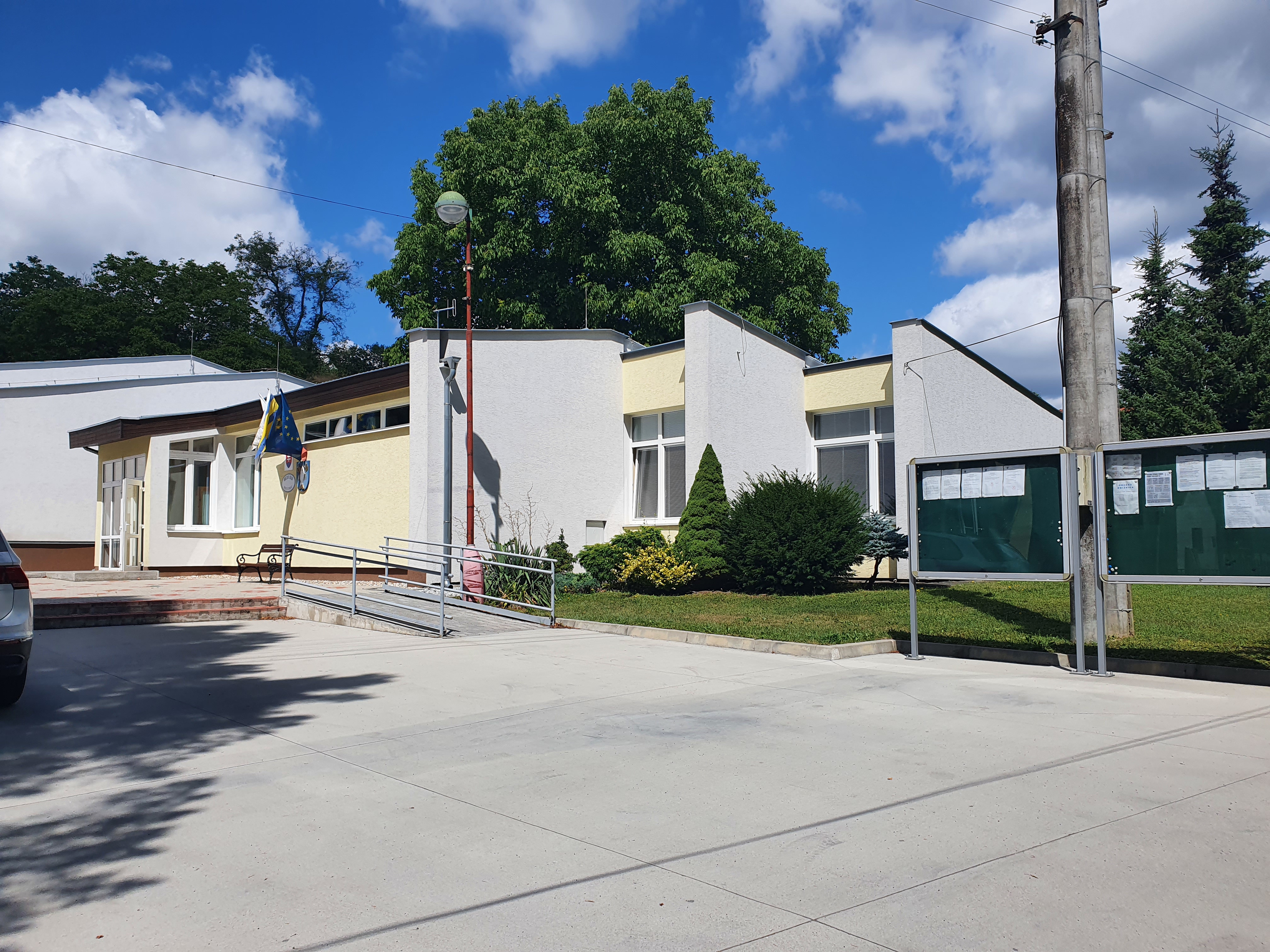

- Flag

- Location of Brestovec in the Trenčín Region Location of Brestovec in Slovakia
- Coordinates: 48°47′02″N 17°33′55″E
- Country: Slovakia
- Region: Trenčín Region
- District: Myjava District
- First mentioned: 1955

Area
  - Total: 16.87 km^{2} (6.51 sq mi)
- Elevation: 387 m (1,270 ft)

Population (2025)
  - Total: 949
- Time zone: UTC+1 (CET)
  - Summer (DST): UTC+2 (CEST)
- Postal code: 907 01
- Area code: +421 34
- Vehicle registration plate (until 2022): MY
- Website: www.brestovec.sk

Brestovec (Hungarian: Brezóvölgy) is a village and municipality in Myjava District in the Trenčín Region of north-western Slovakia.

== History ==
In historical records the village was first mentioned in 1955. Before the establishment of independent Czechoslovakia in 1918, it was part of Nyitra County within the Kingdom of Hungary. From 1939 to 1945, it was part of the Slovak Republic.

== Geography ==
The municipality lies at an altitude of 387 metres (1,270 ft) and covers an area of 16.87 km^{2} (6.51 sq mi) (2025).

== Population ==
Population statistic (10 years)
Year	1995	2005	2015	2025
Count	1018	948	959	949
Difference		−6.87%	+1.16%	−1.04%

Population statistic
Year	2024	2025
Count	962	949
Difference		−1.35%

It has a population of 949 people (31 December 2025).

=== Ethnicity ===
Census 2021 (1+ %)
Ethnicity	Number	Fraction
Slovak	957	97.75%
Czech	22	2.24%
Total	979	

In year 2021 was 979 people by ethnicity 957 as Slovak, 22 as Czech, 9 as Not found out, 3 as German, 2 as Ukrainian, 1 as Rusyn, 1 as Polish, 1 as Hungarian, 1 as Greek, 1 as Bulgarian and 1 as English.

Note on population: The difference values of population numbers in the table "Population statistic" and in the sections "Ethnicity" & "Religion" is caused by the use of various statistical methods.

=== Religion ===
Census 2021 (1+ %)
Religion	Number	Fraction
Evangelical Church	570	58.22%
None	287	29.32%
Roman Catholic Church	72	7.35%
Jehovah's Witnesses	14	1.43%
Not found out	10	1.02%
Total	979	

In year 2021 was 979 people by religion 570 from Evangelical Church, 287 from None, 72 from Roman Catholic Church, 14 from Jehovah's Witnesses, 10 from Not found out, 6 from Seventh-day Adventist Church, 4 from Buddhism, 3 from Eastern Orthodox Church, 3 from Greek Catholic Church, 2 from Other, 2 from Church of the Brethren, 1 from Jewish community, 1 from Calvinist Church, 1 from Christian Congregations in Slovakia, 1 from United Methodist Church, 1 from Church of Jesus Christ of Latter-day Saints and 1 from Ad hoc movements.
