= Myjava District =

Coordinates: 48°45′2″N 17°33′55″E

- District
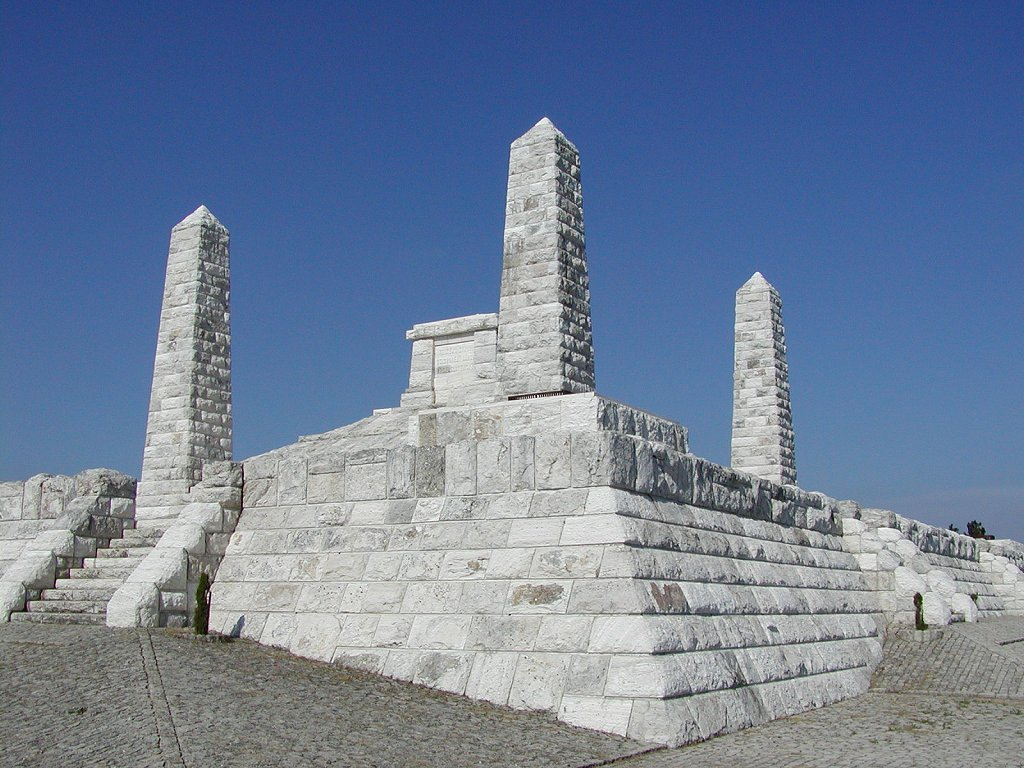
- Country: Slovakia
- Region (kraj): Trenčín Region
- Seat: Myjava

Area
  - Total: 327.42 km^{2} (126.42 sq mi)

Population (2025)
  - Total: 24,551
- Time zone: UTC+1 (CET)
  - Summer (DST): UTC+2 (CEST)
- Telephone prefix: 034
- Vehicle registration plate (until 2022): MY
- Municipalities: 17

Myjava District (Slovak: okres Myjava, Hungarian: Milavai járás) is a district in the Trenčín Region of western Slovakia. It is located in the area of the Myjava Hills. Myjava district belongs to the smaller districts in Slovakia and the population density is slightly under the country average. In the north it borders with the Czech Republic. Myjava district was established in 1923 and in its present borders exists from 1996.

== Population ==
Historical population
Year	Pop.	±%
1970	29,331	—
1980	30,699	+4.7%
1991	30,228	−1.5%
2001	29,243	−3.3%
2011	27,531	−5.9%
2021	25,678	−6.7%
Source: Censuses

Population statistic (10 years)
Year	1995	2005	2015	2025
Count	29,938	28,376	26,961	24,551
Difference		−5.21%	−4.98%	−8.93%

Population statistic
Year	2024	2025
Count	24,809	24,551
Difference		−1.03%

It has a population of 24,551 people (31 December 2025).

=== Ethnicity ===
Census 2021 (1+ %)
Ethnicity	Number	Fraction
Slovak	24,182	92.23%
Not found out	1150	4.38%
Czech	403	1.53%
Total	26,217	

In year 2021 was 26,217 people by ethnicity 24,182 as Slovak, 1150 as Not found out, 403 as Czech, 97 as Other, 80 as Romani, 48 as Hungarian, 41 as Ukrainian, 41 as Romanian, 39 as Russian, 20 as Rusyn, 16 as Moravian, 14 as Polish, 12 as Vietnamese, 10 as Italian, 10 as Serbian, 10 as German, 9 as English, 8 as Jewish, 5 as Turkish, 4 as Austrian, 4 as Croatian, 4 as Bulgarian, 3 as Greek, 3 as Albanian, 2 as French, 1 as Chinese and 1 as Silesian.

Note on population: The difference values of population numbers in the table "Population statistic" and in the sections "Ethnicity" & "Religion" is caused by the use of various statistical methods.

=== Religion ===
Census 2021 (1+ %)
Religion	Number	Fraction
Evangelical Church	11,344	44.18%
None	9137	35.58%
Roman Catholic Church	3021	11.76%
Not found out	1383	5.39%
Total	25,678	

In year 2021 was 25,678 people by religion 11,344 from Evangelical Church, 9137 from None, 3021 from Roman Catholic Church, 1383 from Not found out, 181 from Jehovah's Witnesses, 97 from Ad hoc movements, 86 from Greek Catholic Church, 82 from Other, 71 from Eastern Orthodox Church, 47 from Buddhism, 41 from United Methodist Church, 31 from Other and not ascertained christian church, 24 from Seventh-day Adventist Church, 21 from Paganism and natural spirituality, 18 from Islam, 16 from Apostolic Church, 14 from Christian Congregations in Slovakia, 13 from Church of the Brethren, 11 from Baptists Church, 9 from Calvinist Church, 8 from Old Catholic Church, 7 from Hinduism, 6 from Jewish community, 4 from Czechoslovak Hussite Church, 4 from Bahá'i Community and 2 from Church of Jesus Christ of Latter-day Saints.

== Municipalities ==
The district has 17 municipalities:

Municipality	Area [km^{2}]	Population
Brestovec	16.87	949
Brezová pod Bradlom	41.07	4,496
Bukovec	15.46	418
Hrašné	7.87	465
Chvojnica	16.34	317
Jablonka	12.58	481
Kostolné	10.10	617
Košariská	11.53	415
Krajné	26.98	1,398
Myjava	48.54	10,316
Podkylava	9.95	239
Polianka	9.41	397
Poriadie	7.87	709
Priepasné	13.70	345
Rudník	9.38	827
Stará Myjava	17.72	761
Vrbovce	51.03	1,401

Population and area values are current for year 2025.
