= Rudník, Košice-okolie District =

Village and municipality in Slovakia

Rudník Rudnok
- Municipality
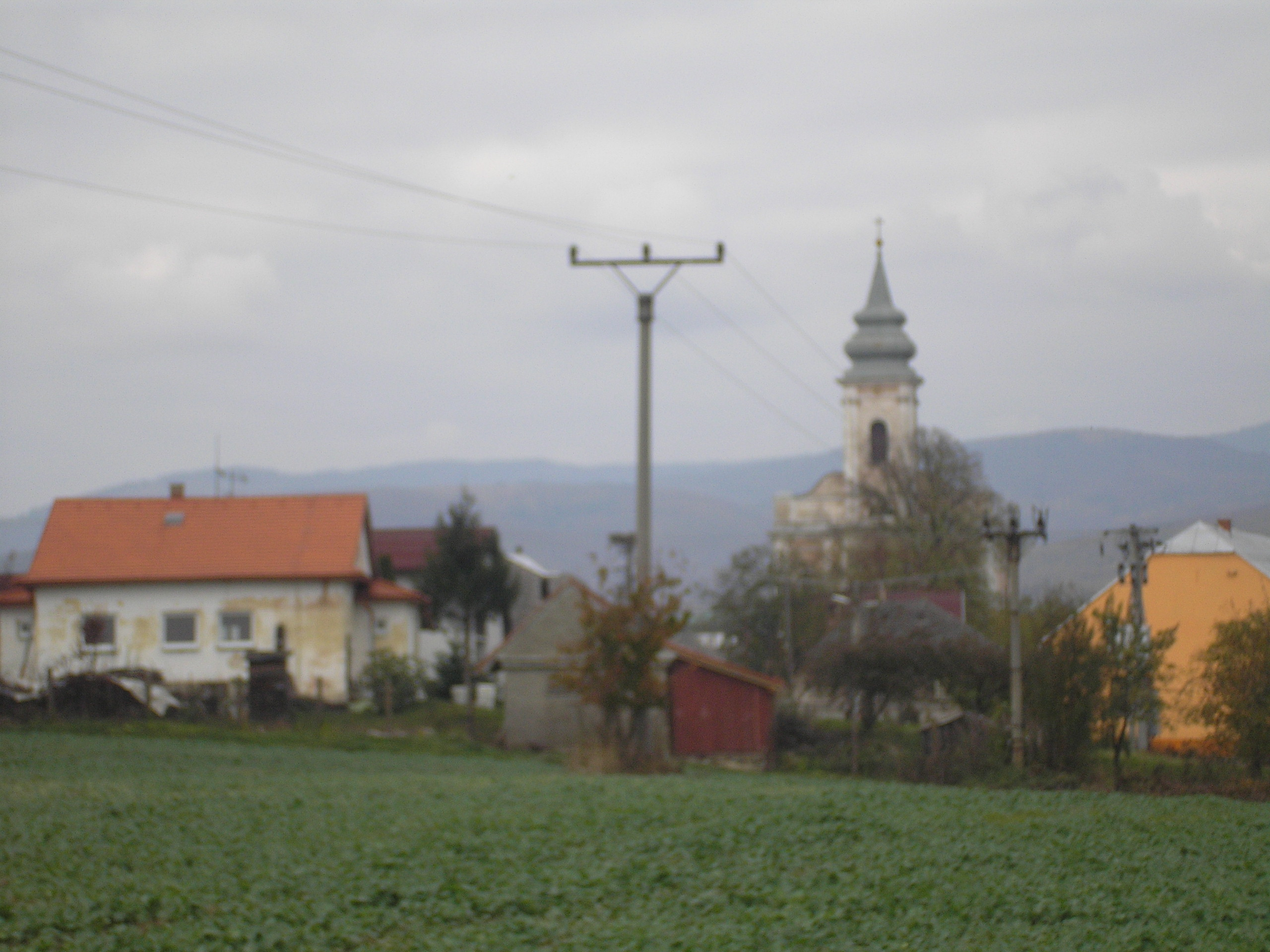

- Flag

- Location of Rudník in the Košice Region Location of Rudník in Slovakia
- Coordinates: 48.69°N 21.01°E
- Country: Slovakia
- Region: Košice Region
- District: Košice-okolie District
- First mentioned: 1255

Area
  - Total: 23.00 km^{2} (8.88 sq mi)
- Elevation: 314 m (1,030 ft)

Population (2025)
  - Total: 622
- Time zone: UTC+1 (CET)
  - Summer (DST): UTC+2 (CEST)
- Postal code: 442 2
- Area code: +421 55
- Vehicle registration plate (until 2022): KS
- Website: www.obecrudnik.sk

Rudník (Hungarian: Rudnok) is a village and municipality in Košice-okolie District in the Košice Region of eastern Slovakia.

== Culture ==
The village has a general store. In the village is the historic church of St. Juraja (St. George) and the House of Culture (social gathering hall). Three kilometers above the village is the church of St. Anne.

== Transport ==
There is a bus line from Košice to the village.

== Population ==
Population statistic (10 years)
Year	1995	2005	2015	2025
Count	670	610	612	622
Difference		−8.95%	+0.32%	+1.63%

Population statistic
Year	2024	2025
Count	624	622
Difference		−0.32%

It has a population of 622 people (31 December 2025).

=== Ethnicity ===
Census 2021 (1+ %)
Ethnicity	Number	Fraction
Slovak	585	96.21%
Not found out	18	2.96%
Total	608	

In year 2021 was 608 people by ethnicity 585 as Slovak, 18 as Not found out, 5 as Hungarian, 4 as Ukrainian, 3 as Czech, 3 as Rusyn, 1 as Serbian, 1 as Russian, 1 as German, 1 as Other and 1 as Croatian.

Note on population: The difference values of population numbers in the table "Population statistic" and in the sections "Ethnicity" & "Religion" is caused by the use of various statistical methods.

=== Religion ===
Census 2021 (1+ %)
Religion	Number	Fraction
Roman Catholic Church	466	76.64%
None	75	12.34%
Not found out	29	4.77%
Greek Catholic Church	20	3.29%
Total	608	

In year 2021 was 608 people by religion 466 from Roman Catholic Church, 75 from None, 29 from Not found out, 20 from Greek Catholic Church, 6 from Eastern Orthodox Church, 3 from Calvinist Church, 3 from Evangelical Church, 2 from Other, 2 from Ad hoc movements, 1 from Paganism and natural spirituality and 1 from Islam.
