= Jablonka, Myjava District =

Jablonka
- Municipality
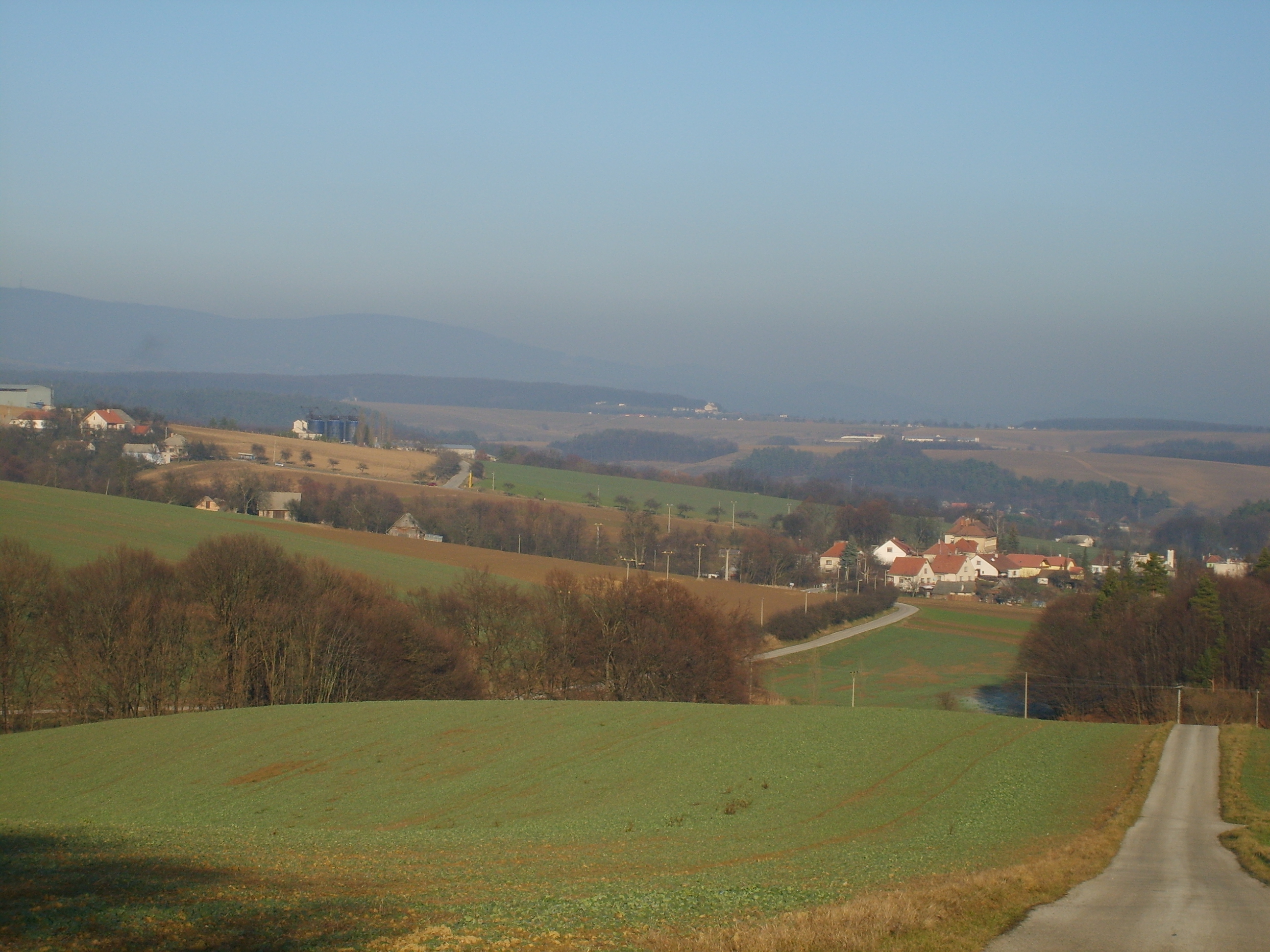

- Flag

- Location of Jablonka in the Trenčín Region Location of Jablonka in Slovakia
- Coordinates: 48°43′29″N 17°36′35″E
- Country: Slovakia
- Region: Trenčín Region
- District: Myjava District
- First mentioned: 1955

Area
  - Total: 12.58 km^{2} (4.86 sq mi)
- Elevation: 287 m (942 ft)

Population (2025)
  - Total: 481
- Time zone: UTC+1 (CET)
  - Summer (DST): UTC+2 (CEST)
- Postal code: 906 21
- Area code: +421 34
- Vehicle registration plate (until 2022): MY
- Website: www.jablonka.sk

Jablonka is a village and municipality in the Myjava District in the Trenčín Region of West Slovakia. The name Jablonka literally translates as a 'small apple tree', which can be explained by the large number of apple trees in and around the village.

== History ==
In historical records the village was first mentioned in 1690 and was officially established in today's borders in 1955.

== Geography ==
The municipality lies at an altitude of 287 metres (942 ft) and covers an area of 12.58 km^{2} (4.86 sq mi) (2025). The small villages in Jablonka consist of U maliarikovci, U usiiacovci and U michalickovci.

== Population ==
Population statistic (10 years)
Year	1995	2005	2015	2025
Count	597	498	471	481
Difference		−16.58%	−5.42%	+2.12%

Population statistic
Year	2024	2025
Count	474	481
Difference		+1.47%

It has a population of 481 people (31 December 2025).

=== Ethnicity ===
Census 2021 (1+ %)
Ethnicity	Number	Fraction
Slovak	456	97.02%
Czech	12	2.55%
Not found out	7	1.48%
Total	470	

In year 2021 was 470 people by ethnicity 456 as Slovak, 12 as Czech, 7 as Not found out, 4 as Hungarian, 2 as Russian, 1 as Vietnamese, 1 as Ukrainian and 1 as Other.

Note on population: The difference values of population numbers in the table "Population statistic" and in the sections "Ethnicity" & "Religion" is caused by the use of various statistical methods.

=== Religion ===
Census 2021 (1+ %)
Religion	Number	Fraction
Evangelical Church	259	55.11%
None	151	32.13%
Roman Catholic Church	37	7.87%
Not found out	8	1.7%
Total	470	

In year 2021 was 470 people by religion 259 from Evangelical Church, 151 from None, 37 from Roman Catholic Church, 8 from Not found out, 4 from Ad hoc movements, 3 from Other, 2 from Greek Catholic Church, 2 from Buddhism, 1 from Old Catholic Church, 1 from Eastern Orthodox Church, 1 from Jehovah's Witnesses and 1 from United Methodist Church.
