= Western Carpathian offensive =

Red Army offensive in World War II

- Part of the Eastern Front of World War II
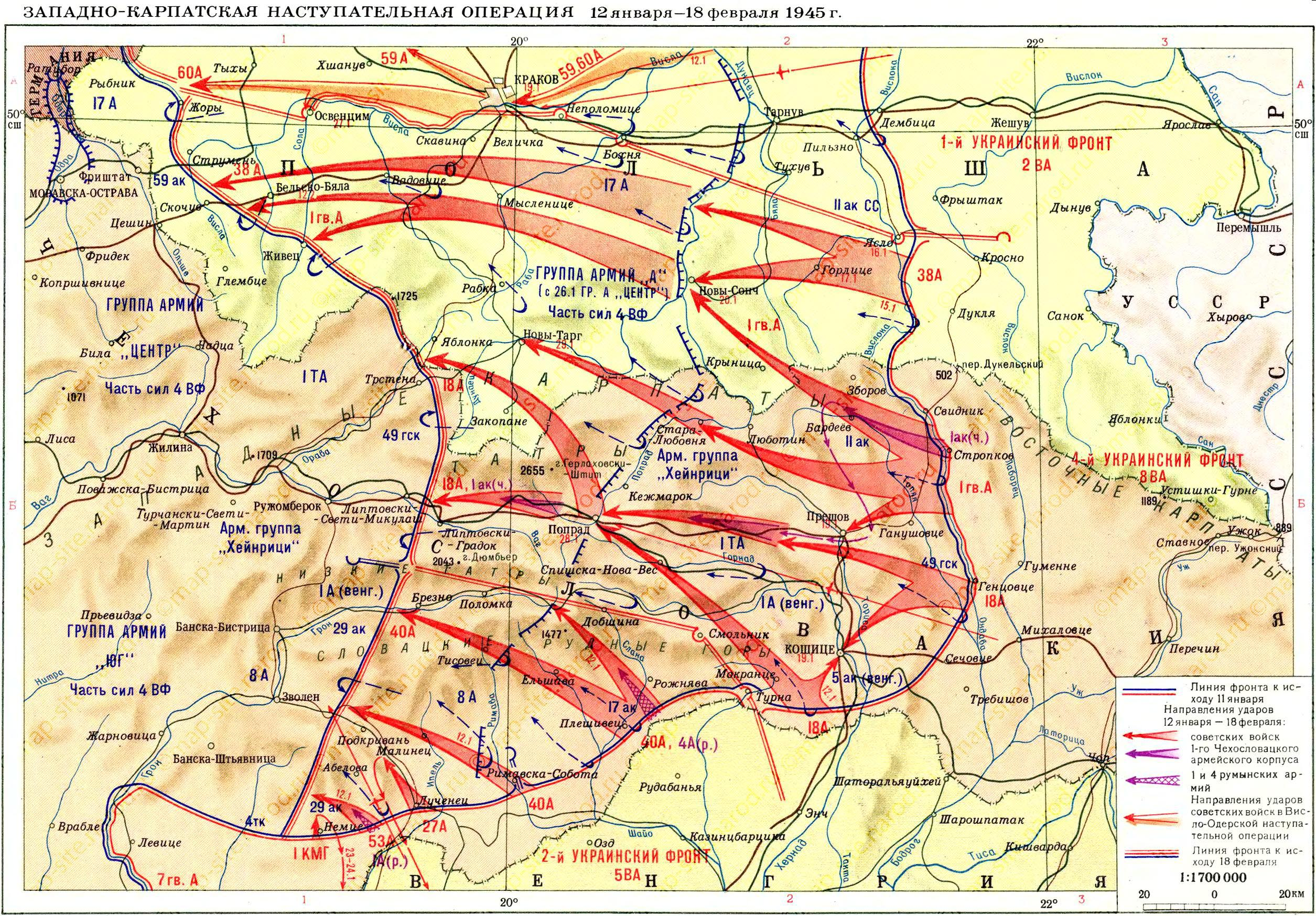
- Advance of the 2nd and 4th Ukrainian Front
Date	12 January – 18 February 1945
Location	Slovak Republic and Southern Poland
Result	Allied victory

Belligerents
Germany (Kingdom of Hungary (1920–1946)) Hungary	Soviet Union; Romania; Czechoslovakia

Commanders and leaders
Josef Harpe; Ferdinand Schörner	Konstantin Rokossovsky; Ivan Petrov

Strength
Unknown	(Soviet Union) 482,000 men (Kingdom of Romania) 99,300 men (Czechoslovak government-in-exile) 11,500 men

Casualties and losses
Unknown killed or wounded 137,000 captured	(Soviet Union) 79,000 men (Kingdom of Romania) 12,000 men (Czechoslovak government-in-exile) 970 men

The Western Carpathian offensive (Russian: Западно-Карпатская наступательная операция) was a successful offensive by the Red Army during World War II, that lasted from January 12 to February 18, 1945.

== Troop strengths ==
The 4th Ukrainian Front (including the 1st Czechoslovak Corps under Ludvík Svoboda) under Ivan Petrov and the 2nd Ukrainian Front under Rodion Malinovsky (including the 1st Romanian Army under Nicolae Macici and the 4th Romanian Army under Nicolae Dăscălescu), were to push back the German troops gathered in the Western Carpathians.
The Axis forces were composed of the 1st Panzer Army (Gotthard Heinrici), the 8th Army (Hans Kreysing), and parts of the 17th Army (Friedrich Schulz) and the 1st Hungarian Army (Dezső László). The German defensive lines were based not only on the mountainous terrain but also on several lakes and rivers.

== The offensive ==
The offensive began on the same day as the much larger Vistula–Oder offensive, while the East Prussian offensive was opened a day later.

=== Offensive of the 4th Ukrainian Front ===
On January 12, at 8:15 a.m., the 38th Army (Colonel General Kirill Moskalenko) of the 4th Ukrainian Front attacked after heavy artillery preparation with two Rifle Corps (the 101st and 67th). Behind its left flank, the 52nd Rifle Corps was held in reserve for a follow-up attack. On 15 January, the breakthrough through the German XI SS Panzer Corps (General Matthias Kleinheisterkamp) was achieved and could be pursued up to 18 km in the next few days. On January 16, Jasło (in present-day south-eastern Poland) was captured by the 70th Guards and 140th Rifle Division of the 101st Rifle Corps.

On 18 January, to the south, the 1st Guards Army (General Andrei Grechko) opened its offensive against the German XI Army Corps (General von Bünau) over the Ondava river. The 4th Ukrainian Front used about 215 tanks and self-propelled guns, 134 of them with the 38th Army and only 42 tanks in the 1st Guard Army because of the mountainous terrain.

The front of the German 253rd Infantry Division (Lieutenant General Carl Becker), deployed in the area 25 km south of Jasło, from Polany to south of Stropkov, was torn apart by the Soviet 11th and 107th Rifle Corps. The German troops were pushed back up to 22 km and the next day Prešov was captured by Soviet troops.

Further to the south, the Soviet 18th Army (Lieutenant General Anton Gastilovich) attacked the positions of the German XXXXIX Mountain Corps (General Karl von Le Suire), in the section of the Hungarian V. Corps, and the city of Košice (in present-day Eastern Slovakia) was taken.

=== Offensive of the 2nd Ukrainian Front ===
The left wing of the 2nd Ukrainian Front simultaneously launched its offensive from northern Hungary and invaded the Slovak Ore Mountains. The Soviet 40th Army (Lieutenant General Filipp Zhmachenko) pushed the Hungarian 1st Army back through the Rosenau cauldron to Rožňava, crossed the river Sajó and captured the city of Brezno (Pleshevets–Breznovsk offensive or Plešivec–Brezno offensive). To the left of it, the Soviet 27th Army (Colonel-General Sergei Trofimenko) accompanied the advance on Zvolen.

=== Final phase ===
By the end of January, the troops of the 4th Ukrainian Front reached the German defensive lines on the river Soła east of the line Żywiec - Jablonka - Liptovský Hrádok - Liptovský Mikuláš. The advance of the 4th Ukrainian Front was stopped west of Strumień, Żywiec and Jablonka, east of Liptovský Hrádok and Liptovský Mikuláš. The heavily defended town of Bielsko-Biała was captured by the 1st Guards Army and the 38th Army. The 2nd Ukrainian Front continued the fighting until mid-March and reached the Hron River.

=== Losses and consequences ===
The Red Army crushed 17 divisions and 1 brigade of the Axis powers, taking 137,000 prisoners, according to its own not always verifiable sources. In addition, it destroyed or captured 2,300 guns, 320 tanks and 65 aircraft, also according to its own data. Large parts of Slovakia and the southern areas of Poland were liberated from the German occupiers. The Red Army puts its own casualties at 78,988 (including 16,337 dead and 62,651 wounded). The Romanian 1st and 4th army lost 12,000 soldiers (2,500 dead) and the 1st Czechoslovak Corps 970 men (260 dead). In addition, 359 tanks, 753 guns and 94 aircraft are said to have been lost on the Soviet side. Germany lost control of the Slovak Ore Mountains, and their strategic resources.

== Sources ==
- This is a translation of an article in the German Wikipedia, Westkarpatische Operation.
