= Nyitra County =

County of the Kingdom of Hungary

Nyitra County Nyitra vármegye (Hungarian) Comitatus Nitriensis (Latin) Komitat Neutra (German) Nitrianska župa (Slovak)
- County of the Kingdom of Hungary (11th-century-1850, 1860-1920)
- Coat of arms

- Capital: Nyitra
- Area
  - Coordinates: 48°19′N 18°5′E
  - 1910: 5,519 km^{2} (2,131 sq mi)
- Population
  - 1910: 457,455
- History
  - Established: 11th century
  - Disestablished: 1850
  - County recreated: 1860
  - Treaty of Trianon: 4 June 1920
- Today part of: Slovakia
- Nitra is the current name of the capital.

Nyitra County (Hungarian: Nyitra vármegye; German: Neutraer Gespanschaft/Komitat Neutra; Latin: Comitatus Nitriensis; Slovak: Nitriansky komitát / Nitrianska stolica / Nitrianska župa) was an administrative county (comitatus) of the Kingdom of Hungary. Its territory lay in what is now western Slovakia.

== Geography ==
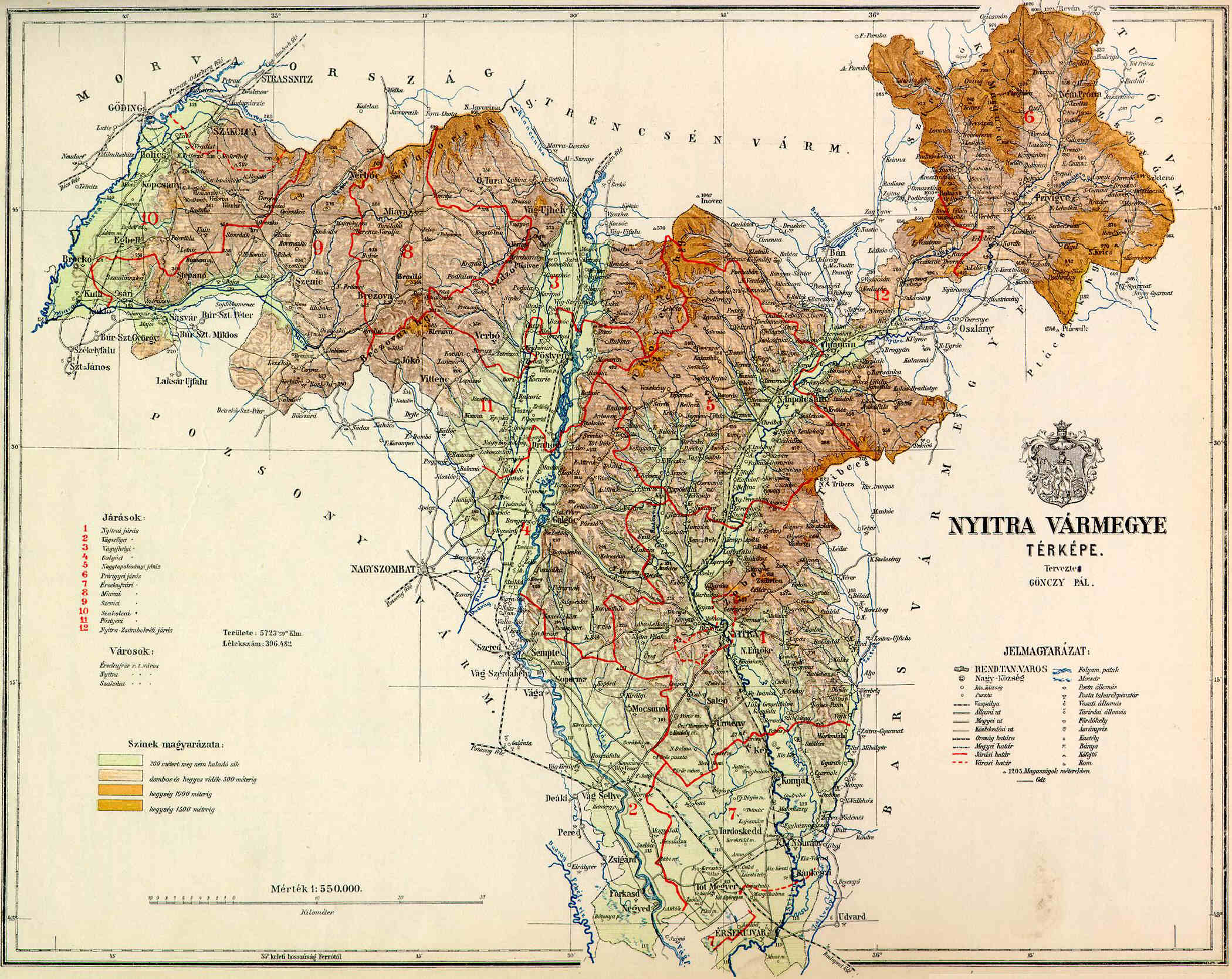
Map of Nyitra, 1891

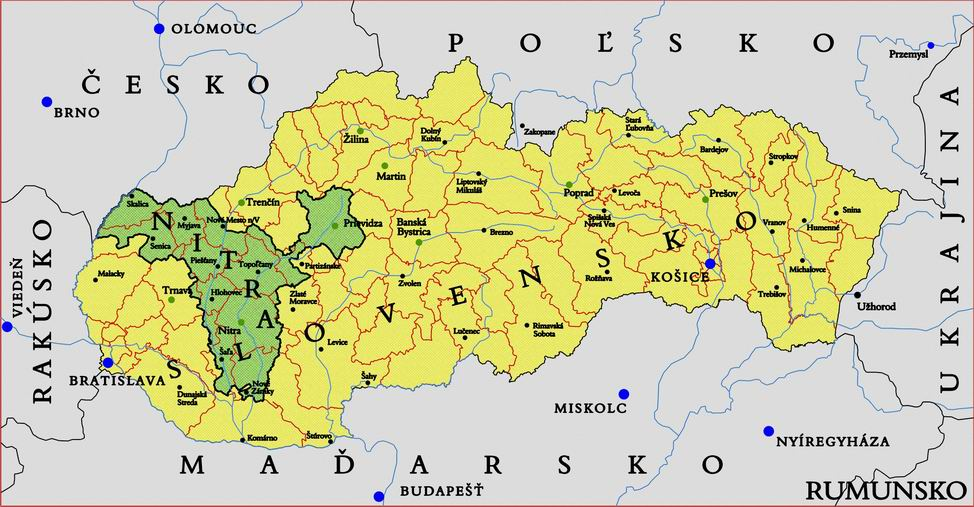
Former county of Nyitra superimposed on map of contemporary Slovakia.

Nyitra County shared borders with the Austrian land Moravia and Trencsén County, Turóc County, Bars County, Komárom County and Pozsony County. In its final phase, it was a strip of land between the Morava river in the north and the town of Érsekújvár (present-day Nové Zámky) in the south, plus an outlier around the town of Privigye (present-day Prievidza). The river Vág (present-day Váh) flowed through the county. Its area was 5519 km^{2} around 1910.

== Capitals ==
The capital of the county was the Nitra Castle (Hungarian: Nyitrai vár) and since the Late Middle Ages the town of Nyitra (present-day Nitra).

== History ==
A predecessor to Nyitra county may have existed as early as in the 9th century at the time of Great Moravia. Around 1000, Nyitra county arose as one of the first comitatus of the Kingdom of Hungary. The southern part, including the town Nyitra, was ruled as Uyvar Province between 1663 and 1685 by Ottoman Empire. The county shortly ceased to exist as a separate administrative unit between 1850 and 1860, when it was split into Upper Nyitra County (including Bán district from Trencsén County) and Lower Nyitra County (including Oszlány district from Bars County).

After World War I, Nyitra county became part of newly formed Czechoslovakia. Nitra county (Nitrianska župa) continued to exist within its original borders until 1923, when it was replaced by the so-called "Nitra Great County", officially County XIV. (Nitrianska). In 1928, Nitra County was abolished like all other counties in Slovakia. In November 1938 Hungary annexed some southern parts of the former county in the First Vienna Award; these became part of the Nyitra és Pozsony k.e.e. vármegye (a közigazgatásilag egyelőre egyesített vármegye, 'county administratively combined for the time being'), along with annexed parts of the former Pozsony County. During the First Slovak Republic the county was briefly restored (1940-1945) (without the annexed southern areas).

== Demographics ==
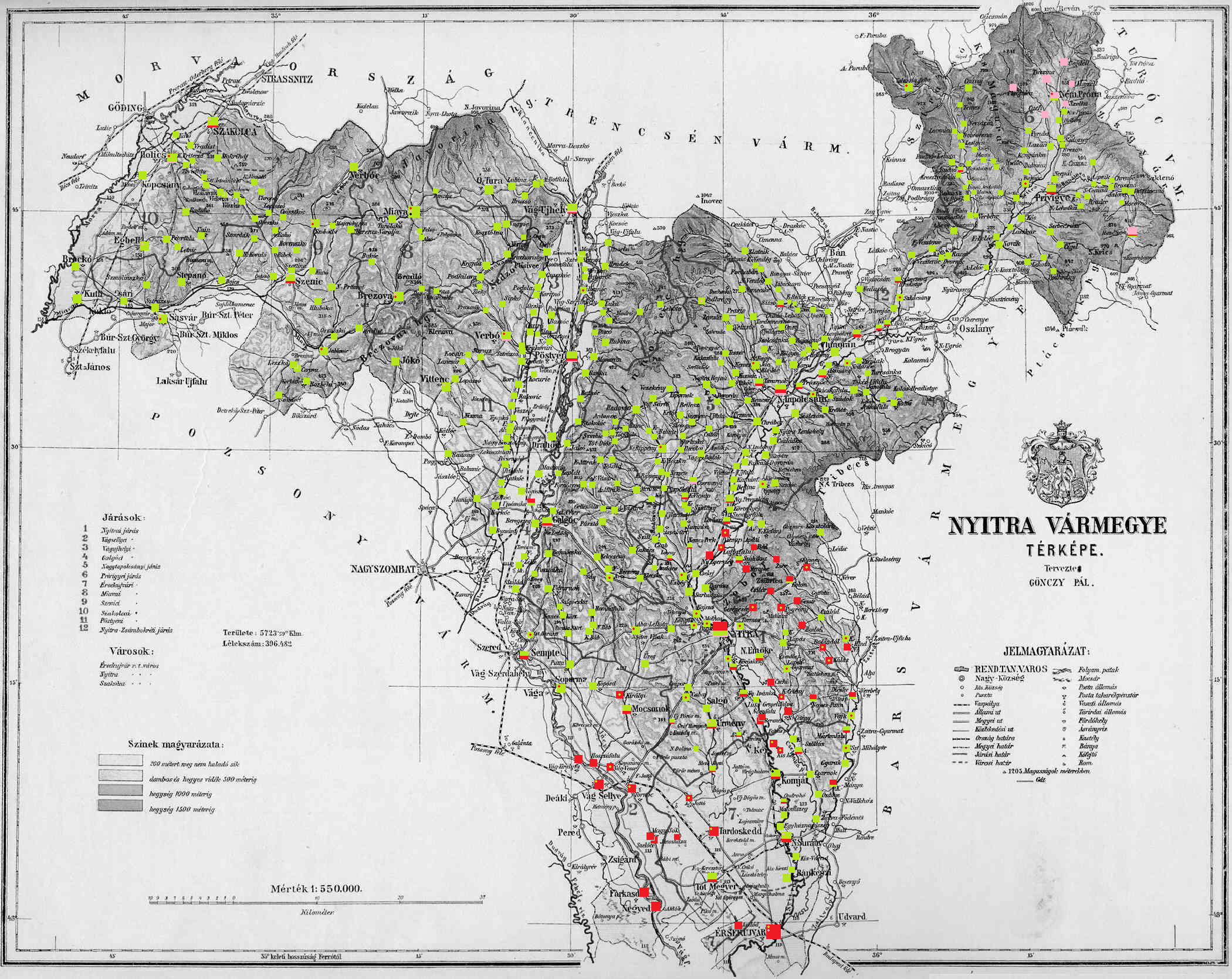
Ethnic map of the county with data of the 1910 census (see the key in the description).

Population by mother tongue (Note: Only linguistic communities > 1% are displayed.)
Census	Total	Slovak	Hungarian	German	Other or unknown
1880	370,099	263,409 (73.91%)	54,294 (15.23%)	36,503 (10.24%)	2,174 (0.61%)
1890	396,559	288,811 (72.83%)	69,498 (17.53%)	35,893 (9.05%)	2,357 (0.59%)
1900	428,296	312,601 (72.99%)	80,962 (18.90%)	32,370 (7.56%)	2,363 (0.55%)
1910	457,455	324,664 (70.97%)	100,324 (21.93%)	27,937 (6.11%)	4,530 (0.99%)

Population by religion (Note: Only religious communities > 1% are displayed.)
Census	Total	Roman Catholic	Lutheran	Jewish	Calvinist	Other or unknown
1880	370,099	282,583 (76.35%)	52,273 (14.12%)	28,414 (7.68%)	6,668 (1.80%)	161 (0.04%)
1890	396,559	307,168 (77.46%)	54,703 (13.79%)	27,244 (6.87%)	7,339 (1.85%)	105 (0.03%)
1900	428,296	337,905 (78.90%)	57,203 (13.36%)	24,935 (5.82%)	8,035 (1.88%)	218 (0.05%)
1910	457,455	369,225 (80.71%)	56,676 (12.39%)	22,942 (5.02%)	8,238 (1.80%)	374 (0.08%)

== Subdivisions ==
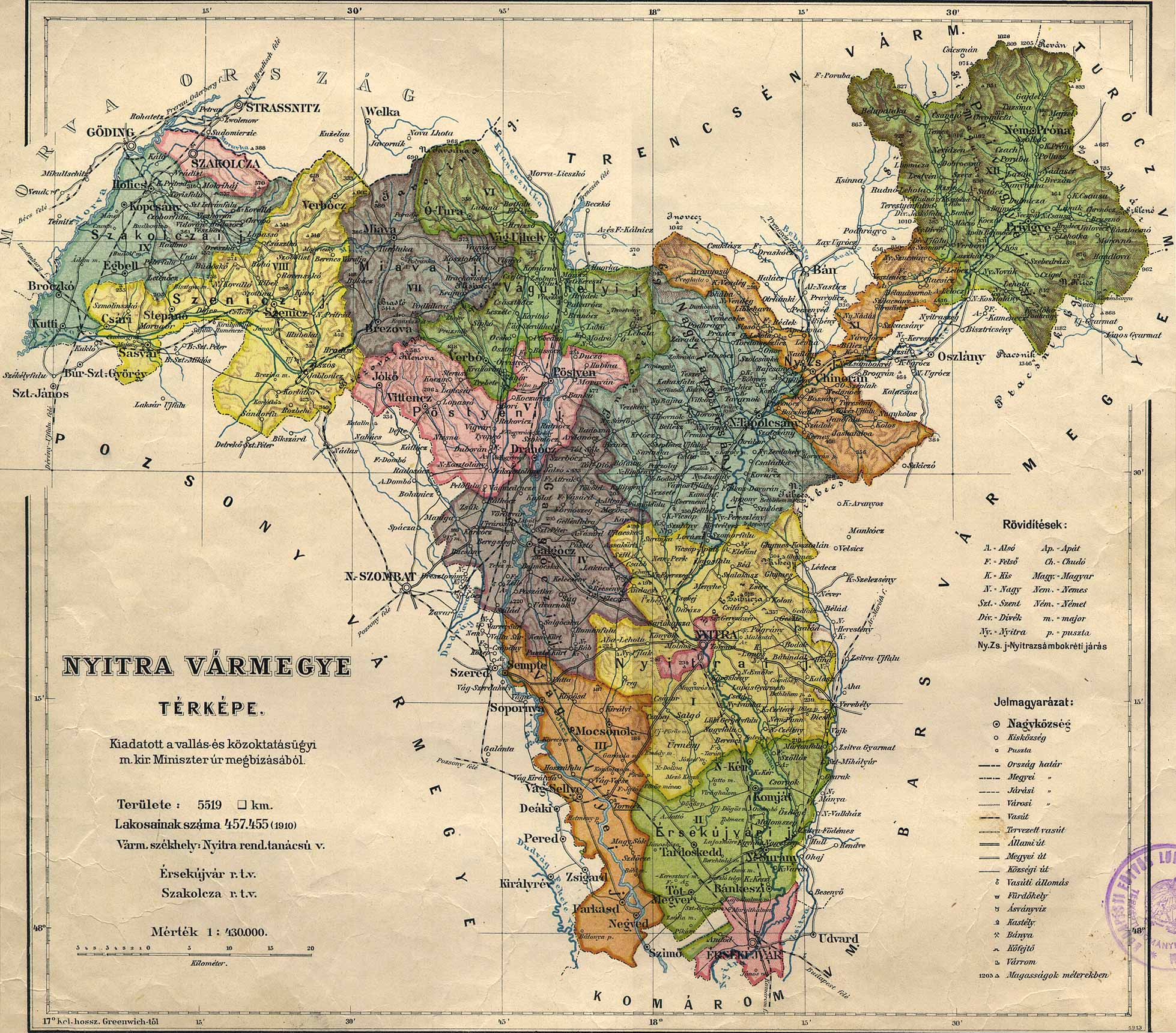

In the early 20th century, the subdivisions of Nyitra county were:

Districts (járás)
District	Capital
Érsekújvár	Nagysurány (now Šurany)
Galgóc	Galgóc (now Hlohovec)
Miava	Miava (now Myjava)
Nagytapolcsány	Nagytapolcsány (now Topoľčany)
Nyitra	Nyitra (now Nitra)
Nyitrazsámbokrét	Nyitrazsámbokrét (now Žabokreky nad Nitrou)
Pöstyén	Pöstyén (now Piešťany)
Privigye	Privigye (now Prievidza)
Szakolca	Holics (now Holíč)
Szenice	Szenice (now Senica)
Vágsellye	Tornóc (now Trnovec nad Váhom)
Vágújhely	Vágújhely (now Nové Mesto nad Váhom)
Urban districts (rendezett tanácsú város)
Érsekújvár (now Nové Zámky)
Nyitra (now Nitra)
Szakolca (now Skalica)
