= List of bridges in the Czech Republic =

This list of bridges in the Czech Republic lists bridges of particular historical, scenic, architectural or engineering interest. Road and railway bridges, viaducts, aqueducts and footbridges are included.

== Historical and architectural interest bridges ==
Image	Name	Czech	Distinction	Length	Type	Carries Crosses	Opened	Location	Region	Ref.
	Písek Stone Bridge	Kamenný most v Písku	National cultural monument	109 m (358 ft)	Masonry; 7 semi-circular arches, ice guards	Road bridge Otava (river)	1270	Písek; 49°18′35.5″N 14°8′44.6″E	South Bohemian	
	Charles Bridge	Karlův most	Historic Centre of Prague; World Heritage Site; National cultural monument	515 m (1,690 ft)	Masonry; 16 arches, 3 bridge towers, ice guards	Footbridge; Former road bridge Vltava	1380	Prague 1; 50°5′11.5″N 14°24′40.7″E	Prague	
	Černvír Wooden Bridge	Dřevěný most (Černvír)	Cultural monument	32 m (105 ft)	Covered bridge Wood	Footbridge; Svratka (river)	1718	Černvír; 49°26′42.3″N 16°20′49.1″E	South Moravian	
	Český Krumlov Castle Bridge	Plášťový most	Historic Centre of Český Krumlov; World Heritage Site; Cultural monument	80 m (260 ft)	Masonry semi circular arches, 3 levels	Footbridge; Former moats	1764	Český Krumlov; 48°48′45.6″N 14°18′46.7″E	South Bohemian	
	Stádlec Suspension Bridge	Stádlecký most	Span: 86 m (282 ft); National cultural monument	146 m (479 ft)	Suspension; Chain bridge, masonry pylons	Footbridge; Lužnice (river)	1848	Stádlec; 49°22′2.3″N 14°30′52.8″E	South Bohemian	
	Žampach viaduct	Žampašský most	Highest stone bridge in the Czech Republic; Height: 41.7 m (137 ft); Cultural monument	109 m (358 ft)	Masonry; 7 semi circular arches	Railway bridge	1900	Kamenný Přívoz; 49°52′22.6″N 14°29′15.7″E	Central Bohemian	
	Pňovany Bridge	Pňovanský most		210 m (690 ft)	Truss; Steel	Pňovany-Bezdružice Railway; Mže; Hracholusky Reservoir	1901	Pňovany–Erpužice; 49°47′10.5″N 13°04′27.1″E	Plzeň	
	Legion Bridge	Most Legií	Cultural monument		Masonry; 9 arches (7 elliptic and 2 segmental)	Road bridge Trams in Prague (lines 9, 12, 22, 23, 97, 98, 99); Vltava	1901	Prague 1–Prague 5; 50°04′53.0″N 14°24′41.7″E	Prague	
	Svatopluk Čech Bridge	Čechův most	Cultural monument	169 m (554 ft)	Arch; Steel deck arch	Road bridge Trams in Prague (lines 2, 17, 22, 23, 93); Vltava	1908	Prague 1–Prague 7; 50°05′34.9″N 14°25′01.5″E	Prague	
	Jurkovič Bridge	Jurkovičův most	Protected as part of Nové Město nad Metují Castle (national cultural monument)		Covered bridge Wood	Footbridge; Nové Město nad Metují Castle gardens	1912	Nové Město nad Metují; 50°20′40.8″N 16°8′57.2″E	Hradec Králové	
	Mánes Bridge	Mánesův most	Cultural monument	186 m (610 ft)	Arch; Concrete deck arch	Road bridge Trams in Prague; Vltava	1914	Prague 1; 50°05′22.4″N 14°24′46.1″E	Prague	
	Bechyně Bridge	Bechyňský most	Span: 90 m (300 ft); National cultural monument	191 m (627 ft)	Reinforced concrete arch bridge	Road and railway bridge Lužnice (river)	1928	Bechyně; 49°17′47″N 14°28′49″E	South Bohemian	
	Sky Bridge 721	Nebeský most 721	World's second longest simple suspension bridge	721 m (2,365 ft)	Suspension; Steel	Footbridge	2022	Dolní Morava; 50°08′56.1″N 16°50′13.1″E	Pardubice	

== Major road and railway bridges ==
This table presents the structures with spans greater than 100 meters (non-exhaustive list).

Image	Name	Czech	Span	Length	Type	Carries Crosses	Opened	Location	Region	Ref.
	Žďákov Bridge	Žďákovský most	380 m (1,250 ft)	543 m (1,781 ft)	Arch; Steel deck arch	Road bridge Silnice I/19; Vltava	1967	Orlík nad Vltavou; 49°30′15.8″N 14°11′0.6″E	South Bohemian	
	Swiss Bay Bridge	Most přes Švýcarskou zátoku	252 m (827 ft)	312 m (1,024 ft)	Suspension; Concrete deck and pylons 30+252+30	Footbridge; Štítarský potok Thaya	1993	Vranov nad Dyjí; 48°54′42.5″N 15°49′11.9″E	South Moravian	
	Troja Bridge	Trojský most (nový)	200 m (660 ft)	262 m (860 ft)	Arch; Steel tied arch Bow-string bridge	Road bridge Trams in Prague (lines 8, 14, 17, 93, 96); Vltava	2013	Prague 7; 50°6′44.5″N 14°26′10.7″E	Prague	
	General Chábery Bridge	Most generála Chábery	151 m (495 ft)	608 m (1,995 ft)	Box girder Prestressed concrete 90+151+102+60	Road bridge Silnice II/247; Elbe	2009	Litoměřice–Lovosice; 50°31′43.0″N 14°06′43.0″E	Ústí nad Labem	
	Podolsko Bridge	Podolský most	150 m (490 ft)	510 m (1,670 ft)	Arch; Concrete deck arch	Road bridge Silnice I/29; Vltava	1942	Podolsko–Temešvár; 49°21′25.8″N 14°16′21.8″E	South Bohemian	
	Franz Joseph Bridge demolished in 1947	Most císaře Františka Josefa I.	144 m (472 ft)	237 m (778 ft)	Suspension; Ordish–Lefeuvre system	Road bridge Vltava	1868	Prague 1–Prague 7; 50°5′38.8″N 14°25′37.3″E	Prague	
	Oparno Bridge	Most Oparno	135 m (443 ft)	258 m (846 ft)	Arch; Concrete deck arch Twin bridges	D8 motorway European route E55; Milešovský potok	2010	Oparno; 50°32′19.5″N 13°59′32″E	Ústí nad Labem	
	Vysočina Bridge	Most Vysočina	134 m (440 ft)	425 m (1,394 ft)	Box girder Prestressed concrete Twin bridges 80+110+134+100	D8 motorway European route E50; European route E65; Oslava	1978	Velké Meziříčí; 49°21′38″N 16°0′54.1″E	Vysočina	
	Bohumil Hrabal Bridge	Most Bohumila Hrabala	125 m (410 ft)	208 m (682 ft)	Arch; Steel tied arch Bow-string bridge	Road bridge Silnice II/272; Elbe	2002	Lysá nad Labem; 50°10′38.1″N 14°51′18.4″E	Central Bohemian	
	Poděbrady Elbe River Bridge	Dálniční most přes Labe u Poděbrad	123 m (404 ft)		Cable-stayed; Concrete box girder deck, concrete pylon 61+123+61	D11 motorway European route E67; Elbe	1990	Poděbrady; 50°07′06.1″N 15°09′36.0″E	Central Bohemian	
	Mariánský most	Mariánský most	123 m (404 ft)	329 m (1,079 ft)	Cable-stayed; Steel deck, concrete pylon Spar type	Road bridge Elbe	1998	Ústí nad Labem; 50°39′37.3″N 14°3′12.3″E	Ústí nad Labem	
	Dr. Edvard Beneš Bridge	Most Dr Edvarda Beneše	114 m (374 ft)		Arch; Steel tied arch Bow-string bridge	Road bridge Silnice II/613; Elbe	1939	Ústí nad Labem; 50°39′33.1″N 14°2′49.7″E	Ústí nad Labem	
	Radotín Bridge	Radotínský most	114 m (374 ft)(x2)	2,045 m (6,709 ft)	Box girder Prestressed concrete	D0 motorway Prague Ring Road; European route E50; Vltava–Berounka	2010	Prague 12–Zbraslav–Prague 16; 49°59′3″N 14°23′56.8″E	Prague	
	Jordán Reservoir Bridge	Harfový most (Tábor)	111 m (364 ft)	212 m (696 ft)	Cable-stayed; Concrete box girder deck, concrete pylon	Road bridge Silnice I/19; Jordán Reservoir	1991	Tábor; 49°25′37.1″N 14°39′52.3″E	South Bohemian	
	Lochkov Bridge	Lochkovský most	100 m (330 ft)	461 m (1,512 ft)	Beam bridge Composite steel/concrete deck V-shaped legs	D0 motorway Prague Ring Road; European route E50	2010	Lochkov; 50°0′9.7″N 14°20′33.1″E	Prague	

== Notes and references ==
- Dušan Josef. "Encyklopedie mostů v Čechách, na Moravě a ve Slezsku" [Encyclopedia of bridges in Bohemia, Moravia and Silesia]. libri.cz (in Czech).
- "Památkový katalog" [Catalog of monuments]. pamatkovykatalog.cz (in Czech). National Heritage Institute.
- Nicolas Janberg. "International Database for Civil and Structural Engineering". Structurae.com.
- Others references

== See also ==
- cs:Seznam nejdelších mostů v Česku (in Czech) - List of the longest bridges in the Czech Republic
- cs:Seznam mostů přes Vltavu (in Czech) - List of bridges over the Vltava
- cs:Seznam mostů přes Blanici (in Czech) - List of bridges over Blanica
- Transport in the Czech Republic
- Highways in the Czech Republic
- Rail transport in the Czech Republic
- Geography of Czech Republic
