= Stádlec Suspension Bridge =

Stádlec Suspension Bridge Stádlecký most
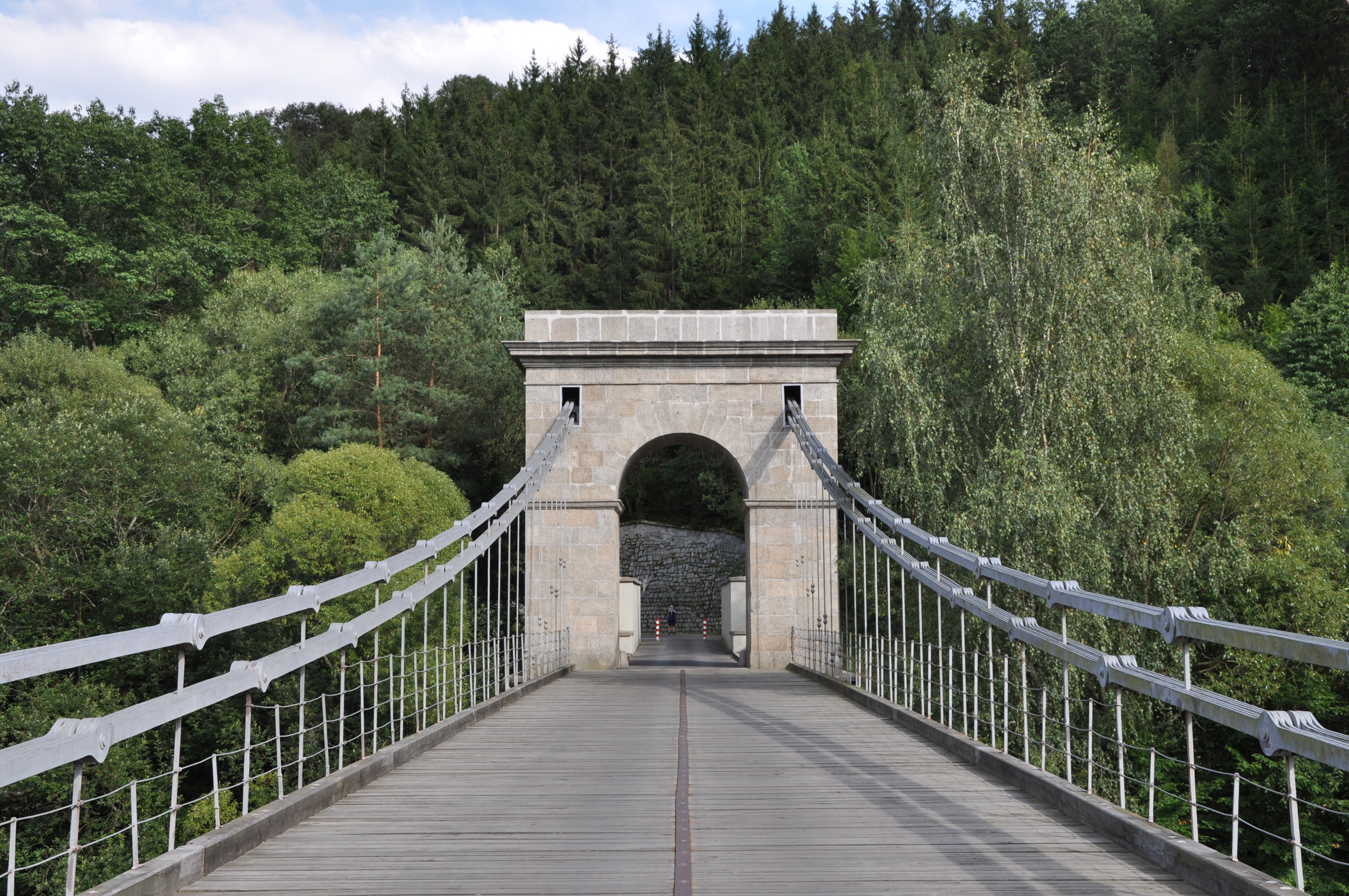
- Stádlec Suspension Bridge
- Coordinates: 49°22′N 14°31′E
- Crosses: Lužnice
- Locale: Stádlec

History
- Construction start: 1847
- Construction end: 1848
- Opened: 1848, 1975

The Stádlec Suspension Bridge (Czech: Stádlecký most) is a suspension bridge over the Lužnice river in Stádlec in the South Bohemian Region of the Czech Republic. It is the last surviving suspension bridge built in Empire style in the country.

Originally, between 1848 and 1960, it spanned the Vltava river near Podolsko. It was dismantled between 1960 and 1975 and moved to its present location near Stádlec. Since 1989, it has been protected as a national cultural monument.

== History ==
The bridge, designed by engineers Gassner and Bedřich Schnirch, was built by Adalbert Lanna the Elder in 1847–1848 over the Vltava in Podolsko. It replaced the old ferry that at that time could not handle the growing traffic between Bavaria and Galicia. The bridge served for many years until 1960 when it was decided to take it down. The reason being that there was already a 510 meters long reinforced concrete bridge from 1942 towering above it and also the Orlík Reservoir was being filled and that would flood the bridge, at that time already a cultural monument. The bridge was dismantled, documented and stored at Markův mlýn. For ten years it has been waiting there for its new home. Finally a picturesque location on the Lužnice near Stádlec was chosen from several possible locations. After the relocation, the bridge has been in operation since the opening ceremony on 25 May 1975, connecting the market town of Stádlec and the village of Dobřejice.

=== Relocation ===
The bridge was dismantled into 2,000 blocks and 1,100 steel parts and then reassembled. After ten years of temporary storage, however, some of the iron parts of the chains were damaged or missing at all, making it much more difficult to recover. Of the total weight 102 tonnes of the iron parts, 14 tonnes had to be recreated, and some new stone blocks had to be delivered. How difficult the dismantling and rebuilding was shows the fact that at some point the officials considered to shorten the bridge from the original 90 m length to only 60 meters.

The construction was completed on 25 May 1975 by the ceremonial insertion of a memorial stone into the right bank pylon. The total relocation cost was 11,837,000 CSK (at that time).

== Description ==
The basic supporting structure consists of four chains arranged in two pairs. These are connected to the wooden deck by vertical rods. The chains are pulled through the holes in the two stone pylons bounding the bridge and anchored in the bricked stone blocks. The stone pylons form 4 m x m x 10 m bridge "gates".The pylon height is 13 m. The bridge is 6 m wide, 157 m long. Bridge tonnage is limited to 2.5 tonnes. The deck consists of oak planks, which were newly installed in 2007. The deck is 5 m above the water level. A mobile catwalk for minor repairs is installed under the deck.

== Reconstruction ==
In 2005, during a general bridge inspection, it was noted that the wooden deck was significantly damaged. A total bridge reconstruction was scheduled for 2006-7. Repair cost was 3.5 million CZK.

In September 2019 the council of the South Bohemian Region endorsed the bridge repair. The estimated cost is 10,162,000 CZK and the work should commence in 2020. The unique bridgework is currently in disrepair since the wooden parts are attacked by a highly invasive and dangerous wood decaying fungus. The repair will include the replacement of all wooden parts and also anti-corrosion measures of the steel parts.

== Recognition ==
In 1959, the bridge was declared a cultural monument. Since 1989, it has been protected as a national cultural monument.

In 2009, the Czech National bank issued a 2500 CZK commemorative gold coin as part of the Industrial Heritage Sites series. The coin was designed by Luboš Charvát.

In 2018 a postage stamp depicting the Podolský and Stádlecký bridges was issued. The stamp with a face value of CZK 35 was designed by Milan Bauer, engraved by Václav Fajt.

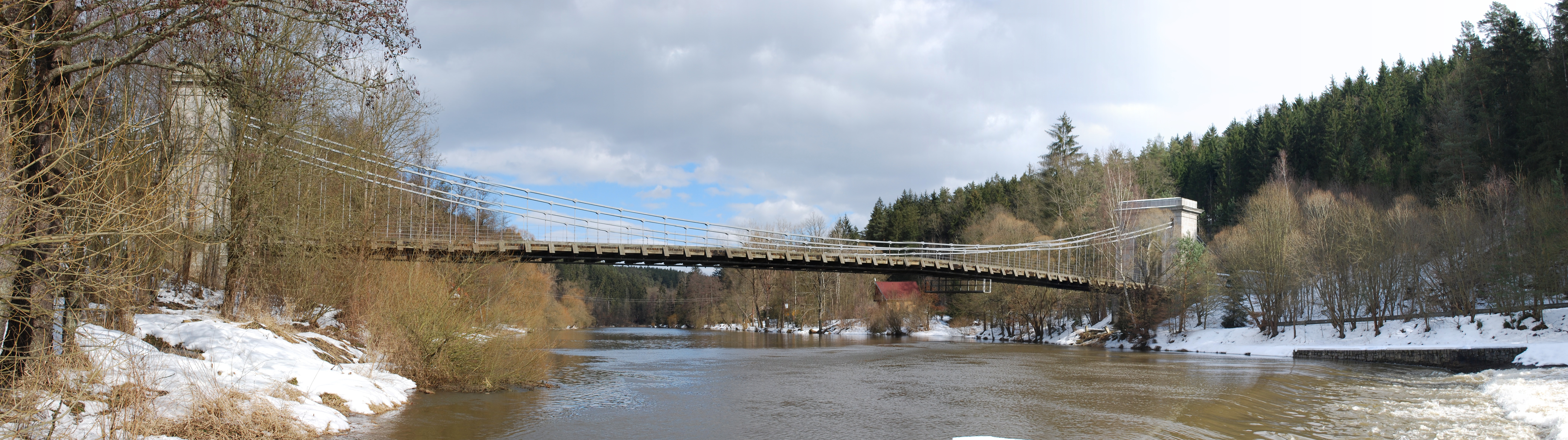
Panorama image of the Stádlec Suspension Bridge

== Gallery ==
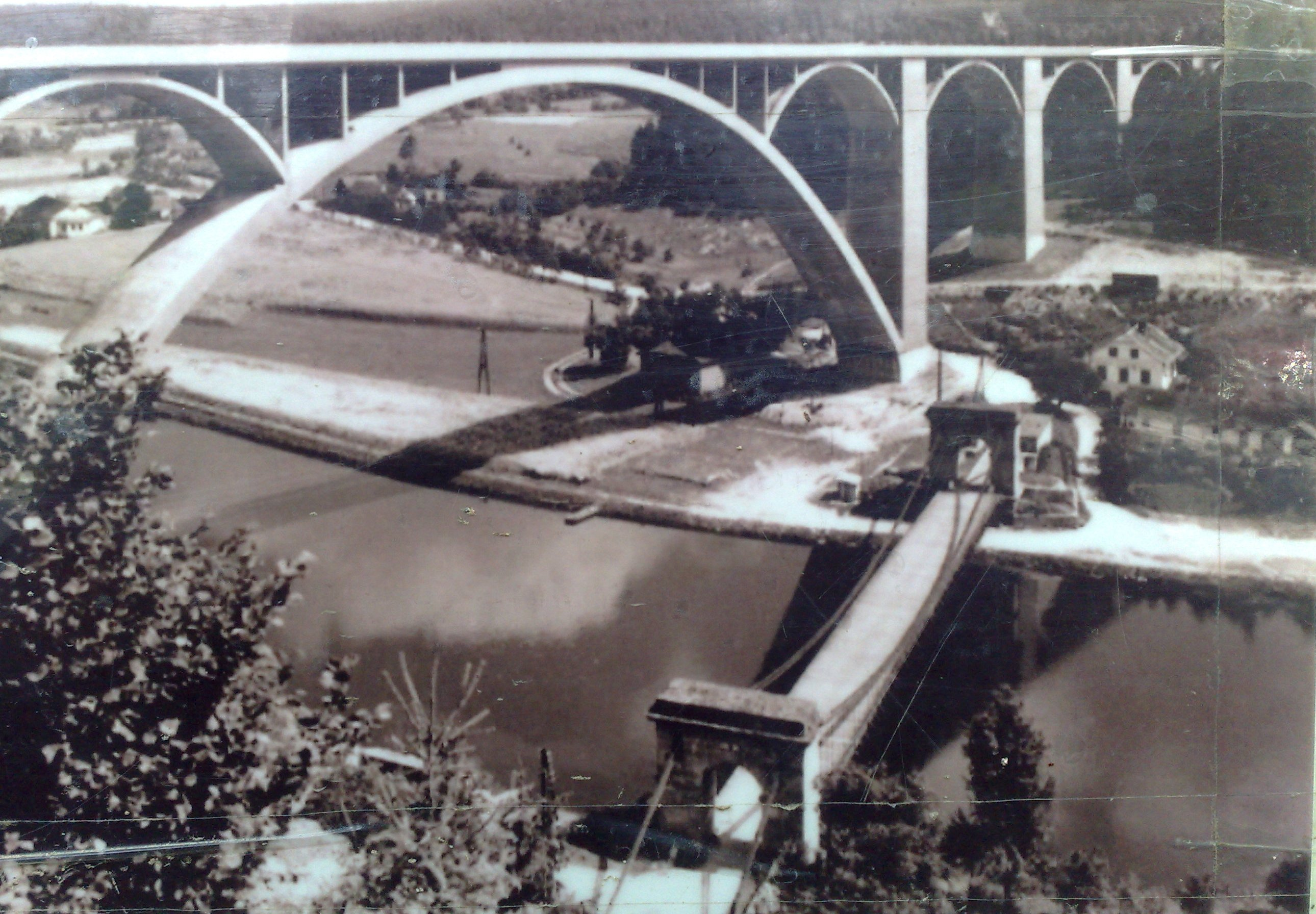
Podolský bridge (in the background) and the suspension bridge at the original location

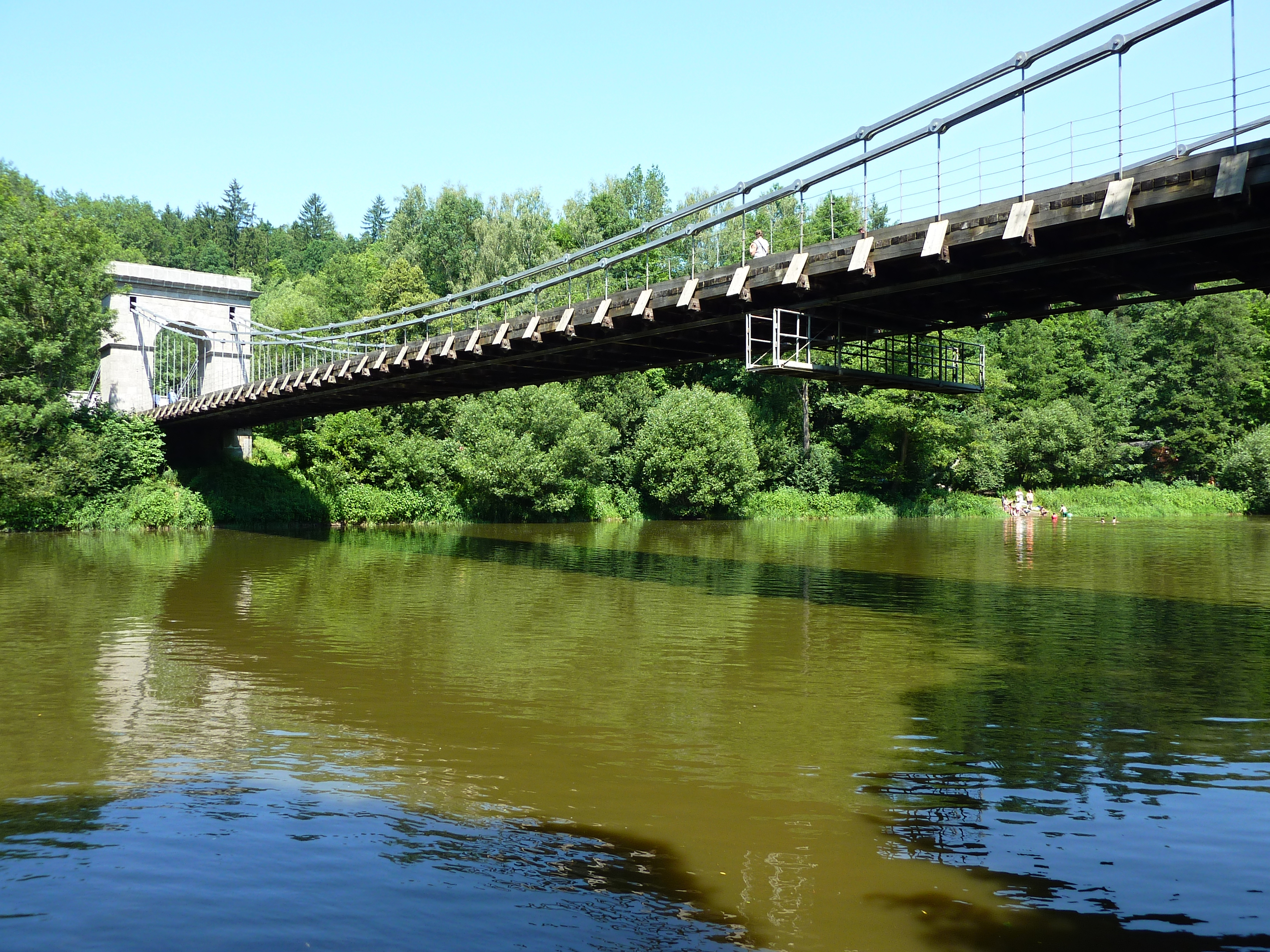
Stádlecký bridge

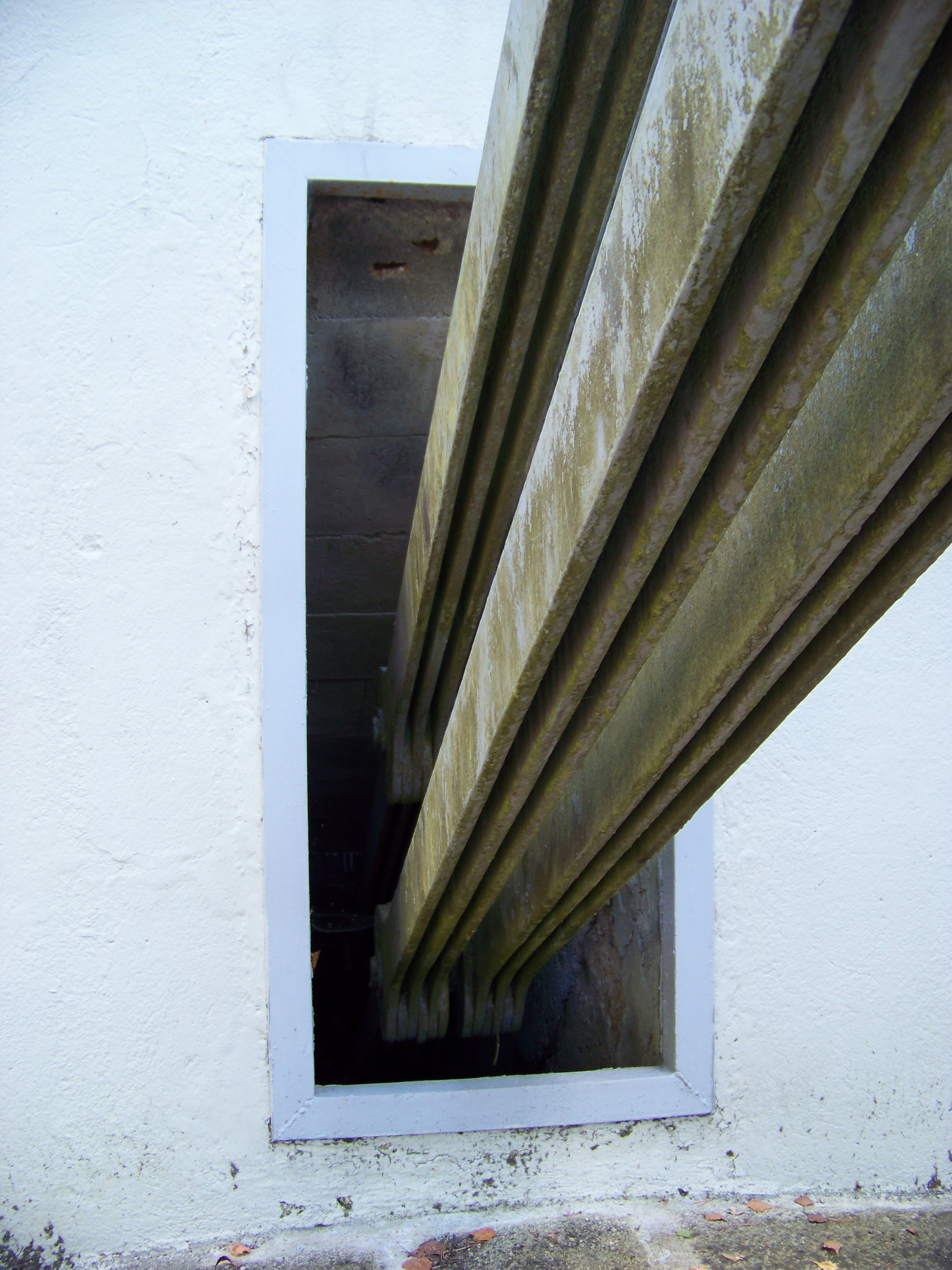
Chain detail

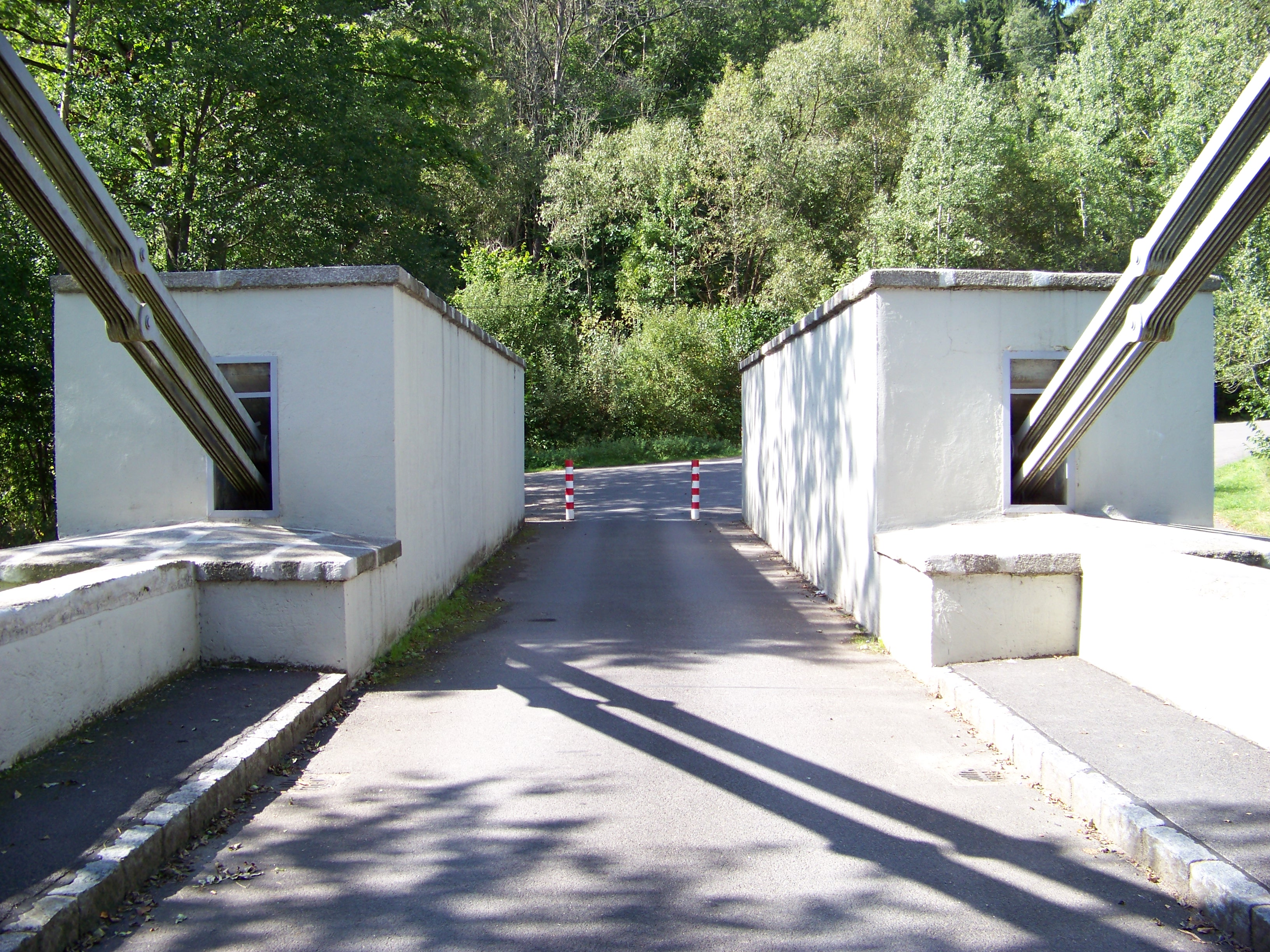
Bridge exit towards Stádlec

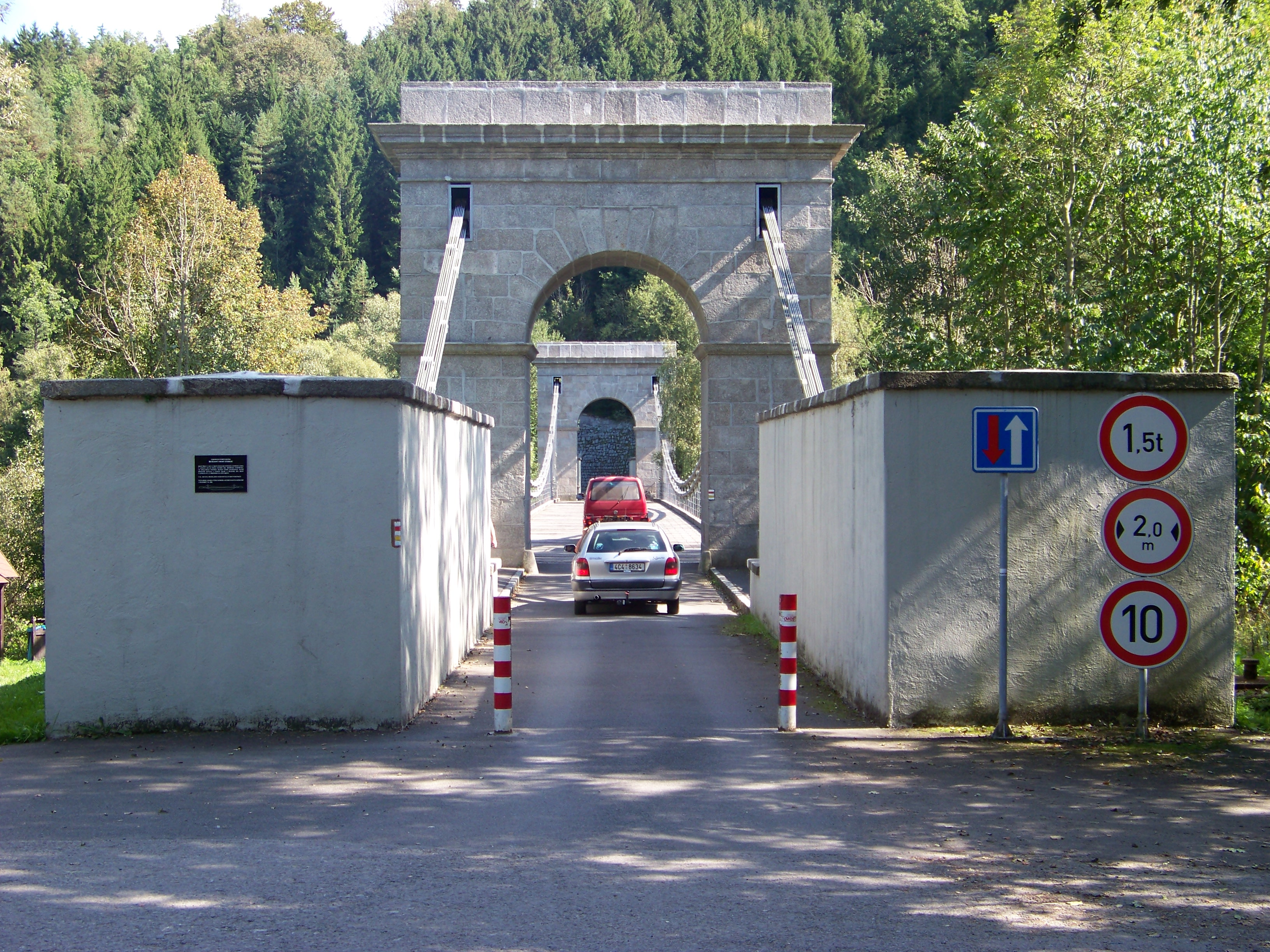
View from Stádlec
