= Jurkovič Bridge =

Bridge in the Czech Republic

Jurkovič Bridge Jurkovičův most
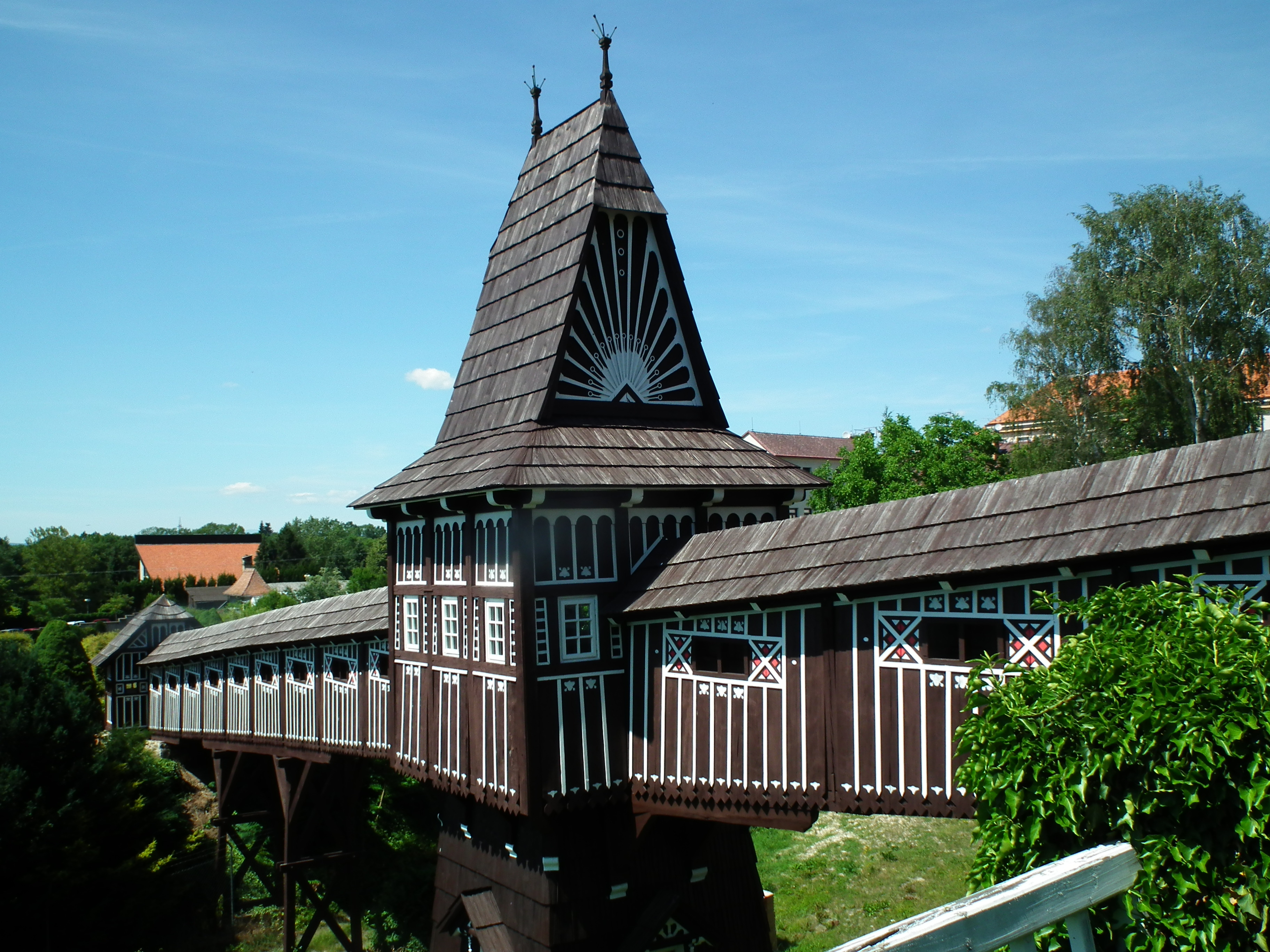
- View from the castle side
- Coordinates: 50°20′41″N 16°8′57″E
- Locale: Nové Město nad Metují, Czech Republic

Characteristics
- Material: Wood
- Total length: 38 m
- Height: 4–8 m

History
- Designer: Dušan Jurkovič
- Construction start: 1911

Jurkovič Bridge (Czech: Jurkovičův most) is a wooden bridge in Nové Město nad Metují, Czech Republic. It was designed by Slovak architect Dušan Jurkovič as part of the reconstruction and renovation of the castle and castle gardens.

The bridge does not span any river. It connects the terrace with the castle garden.

== History ==
Reconstruction work on the castle grounds took place between 1910 and 1913, with the bridge itself being built in 1911 at the request of the castle's owner, textile tycoon Josef Bartoň-Dobenín. The bridge is a typical example of the style of Dušan Jurkovič, who incorporated numerous motifs and details from the folk architecture of various regions, especially Moravian Wallachia.

== Description ==
The bridge is approximately 38 metres (125 ft) long, and the central tower supporting the structure is 12 metres (39 ft) high. The bridge's height above the ground is 4–8 metres. Only 25 people can use the bridge at a time (the permissible load is 70 kg/m²).

== See also ==
- List of bridges in the Czech Republic
