= Jaroslav Josef Polívka =

Czech structural engineer

Jaroslav Josef Polivka (20 April 1886 – 9 February 1960), Czech structural engineer who collaborated with Frank Lloyd Wright between 1946 and 1959.

Jaroslav Josef Polivka a.k.a. J. J. Polivka Civil Engineer was born in Prague in 1886. He received his undergraduate degree in structural engineering at the College of Technology in Prague in 1909. He then studied at the Federal Polytechnic Institute in Zurich, Switzerland and at the Prague Institute of Technology, where he earned a doctoral degree in 1917. After serving in the First World War, he opened his own architectural and engineering office in Prague and developed his skills in stress analysis of reinforced concrete, pre-stressed reinforced concrete and steel structures. Polivka became an expert in photo-elastic stress analysis, a technique that examines small-scale transparent models in polarized light.

In Prague Polivka worked together with avant-garde Czech architect Josef Havlíček on the Habich Building (1927–28) and Chicago Building (1927–28).

Polivka designed the structural frame of the Czech Pavilion at the Paris International Exhibition of 1937 collaborating with renown Czech architect, Jaromír Krejcar and Czech engineer René Wiesner. Two years later, he worked with Czech architect Kamil Roškot to design another Czech Pavilion at the 1939 New York World's Fair. In 1939 Polivka immigrated to the United States and took a position as research associate and lecturer at the University of California, Berkeley. In 1941, he and Victor di Suvero co-invented a structural design technique that received a patent for improvements in structures. Polivka with his son Milos translated into English Eduardo Torroja’s ‘Philosophy of Structures’ book published in 1958.

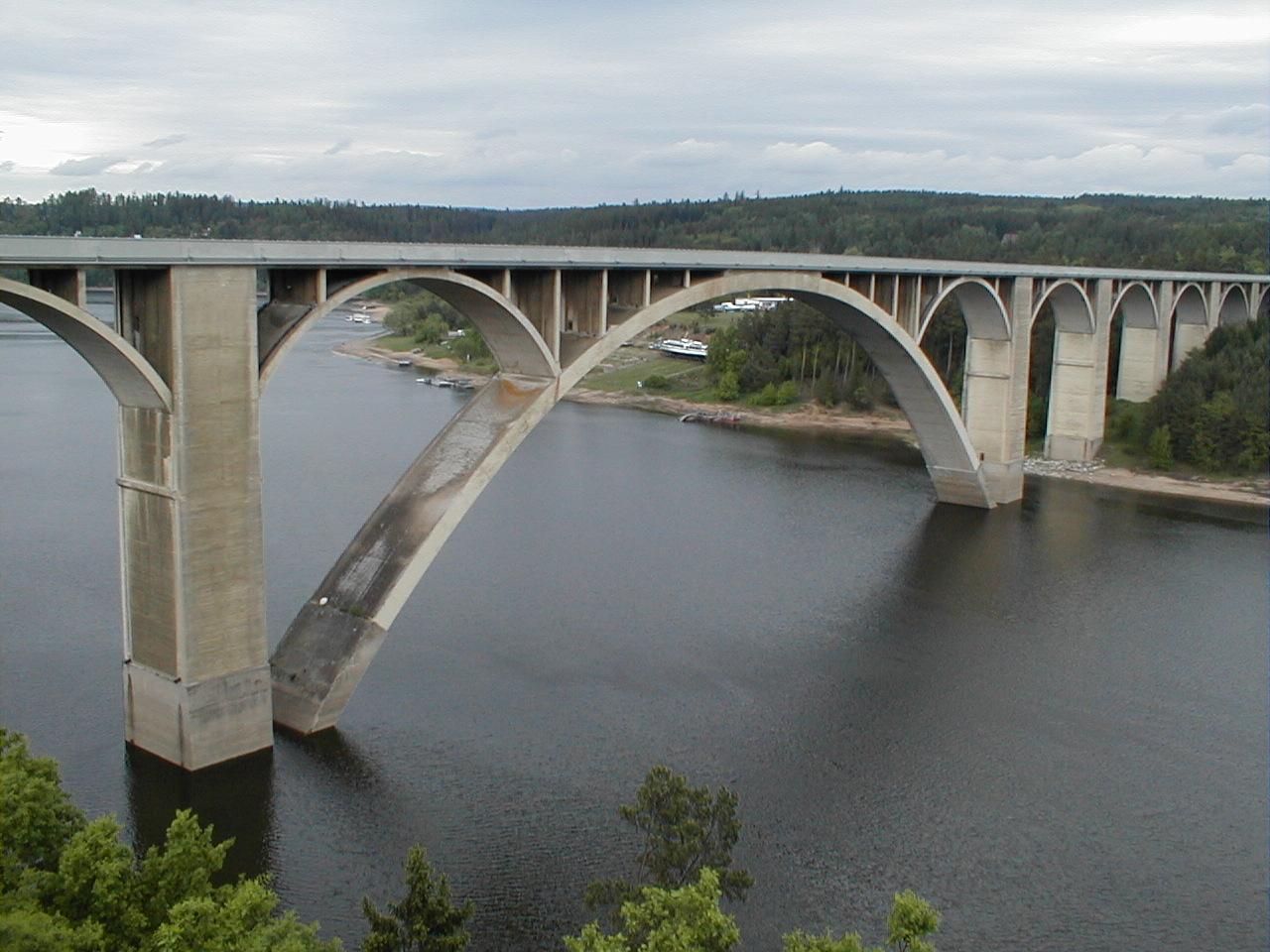
Podolsky Bridge

In 1946 Polivka began to work with Frank Lloyd Wright collaborating on several major projects until Wright's death in 1959. For Wright's projects Polivka performed stress analyses and investigations of specific building materials. They worked on a total of seven projects, two of which were built: the Johnson Wax Research Tower, 1946–1951 at Racine Wisconsin and the Guggenheim Museum, 1946–1959 in New York City for which Polivka managed to design out the gallery ramp perimeter columns initially required. Their other well-known design proposal was the reinforced concrete Butterfly Bridge (proposed at a world record span of 1000-ft) at the Southern Crossing of San Francisco Bay (1949–52).

Polivka performed the photoelasticity for the Podolsko Bridge is an arch bridge that spans the Vltava between Podolsko and Temešvár in Písek District, Czech Republic. At the time of its completion in 1943, it was the longest arch bridge in Czechoslovakia.

He died in Berkeley, California.
