= René Wiesner =

Czech engineer

René Wiesner (13 April 1904 Křimice – 13 February 1974 Bridgend) was a Czech engineer, a specialist in glass-concrete construction.

== Life ==
René Wiesner was an engineer, a specialist in glass-concrete construction projects using cast glass blocks and Verlith tiles manufactured by Fischmann Sons Glassworks, Spol, Prague, Zlatnická Street in the 1930s. Wiesner had an office on Charles Square and worked with engineer Arnošt Ast. He also worked with a number of prominent avant-garde Czech architects, such as František Zelenka (Glass House in Palacký Street), Eugene Rosenberg, František Roit, Bohumír Kozák and Antonín Černý (Assicurazioni Genereli & Moldavia Genereli Building and Broadway Passage), František Kubelka (Hussite Congregation Church, Prague 7). He also worked with Jaromír Krejcar and Jaroslav Josef Polívka on the Czechoslovak Pavilion for the Paris Exhibition in 1937. Before the outbreak of Second World War, in 1939, René Wiesner left for Great Britain. He worked in London initially, in 1946 moving to Bridgend, Wales where he established Novolor Ltd manufacturing photo-printed advertising on clear and silvered glass and souvenir mirrors, paper weights and display tablets, plain mirrors, flat, convex and concave, bevelled glass, photo-printing on plastics, glass silvering and rear-view mirrors for motorcars.

== Literature ==
- Alexandr Brandejs a Adolf Wiesner – mecenáš a jeho zeť
- Arno Pařík. Alexandr Brandejs a Adolf Wiesner – mecenáš a jeho zeť, Židovské museum v Praze, Praha 2004. ISBN 80-85608-92-8
- Fischmann Synové. Verlith F, Skleněné vlýsky, cihly a kameny: Sklobetonové konstrukce, Praha 1937.
- Ivan Margolius. 'Building a New Life', The British Czech and Slovak Review, Autumn 2017, no. 156, pp. 14 – 15.

== See also ==
- Jaroslav Josef Polivka
