= Stádlec =

- Market town
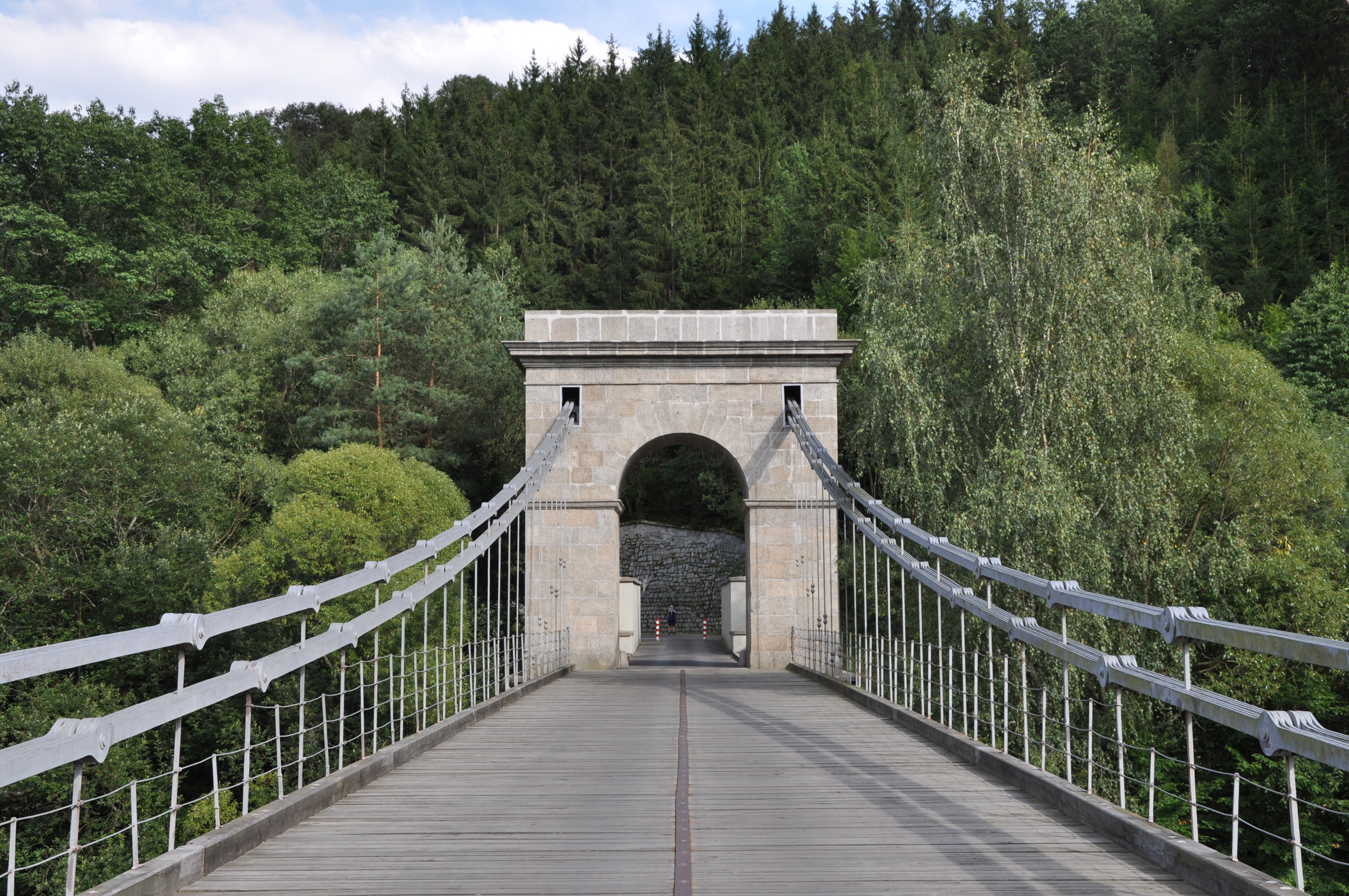
- Stádlec Suspension Bridge

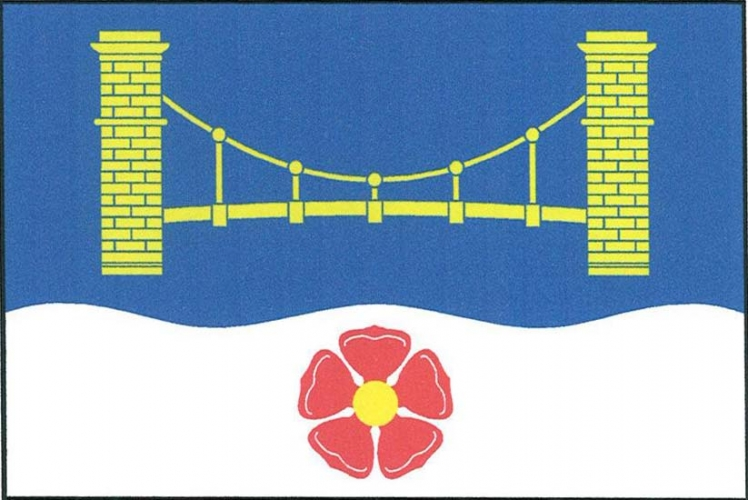
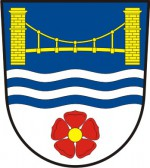
- Flag Coat of arms

- Location in the Czech Republic
- Coordinates: 49°22′47″N 14°29′42″E
- Country: Czech Republic
- Region: South Bohemian
- District: Tábor
- First mentioned: 1287

Area
  - Total: 18.14 km^{2} (7.00 sq mi)
- Elevation: 449 m (1,473 ft)

Population (2026-01-01)
  - Total: 582
  - Density: 32.1/km^{2} (83.1/sq mi)
- Time zone: UTC+1 (CET)
  - Summer (DST): UTC+2 (CEST)
- Postal code: 391 62
- Website: www.stadlec.eu

Stádlec (Czech pronunciation: [ˈstaːdlɛts]) is a market town in Tábor District in the South Bohemian Region of the Czech Republic. It has about 600 inhabitants. The market town is located on the Lužnice River in the Tábor Uplands. Stádlec is known for the Stádlec Suspension Bridge, which is protected as a national cultural monument.

== Administrative division ==
Stádlec consists of five municipal parts (in brackets population according to the 2021 census):

- Stádlec (325)
- Hájky (23)
- Křída (73)
- Slavňovice (55)
- Staré Sedlo (90)

== Etymology ==
The name Stádlec has its root in the Czech word stádo ('herd') and the Old Czech word stadlce (designation of places where herds stood).

== Geography ==
Stádlec is located about 13 kilometres (8 mi) west of Tábor and 70 km (43 mi) south of Prague. It lies in the Tábor Uplands. The Lužnice River flows along the eastern municipal border. The Smutná River briefly flows along the western border. There are several fishponds in the municipal territory, the largest of which is Mlýnský Stádlec.

== History ==
The first written mention of Stádlec is from 1287, when it was a property of Záviš of Falkenstein. The village was owned by various lesser noblemen and the owners often changed. In 1925, Stádlec was promoted to a market town.

== Demographics ==
Historical population

Year	Pop.	±%
1869	1,515	—
1880	1,570	+3.6%
1890	1,421	−9.5%
1900	1,372	−3.4%
1910	1,316	−4.1%

Year	Pop.	±%
1921	1,361	+3.4%
1930	1,155	−15.1%
1950	952	−17.6%
1961	920	−3.4%
1970	812	−11.7%

Year	Pop.	±%
1980	725	−10.7%
1991	658	−9.2%
2001	611	−7.1%
2011	555	−9.2%
2021	566	+2.0%

Source: Censuses

== Transport ==
There are no railways or major roads passing through the municipality.

== Sights ==
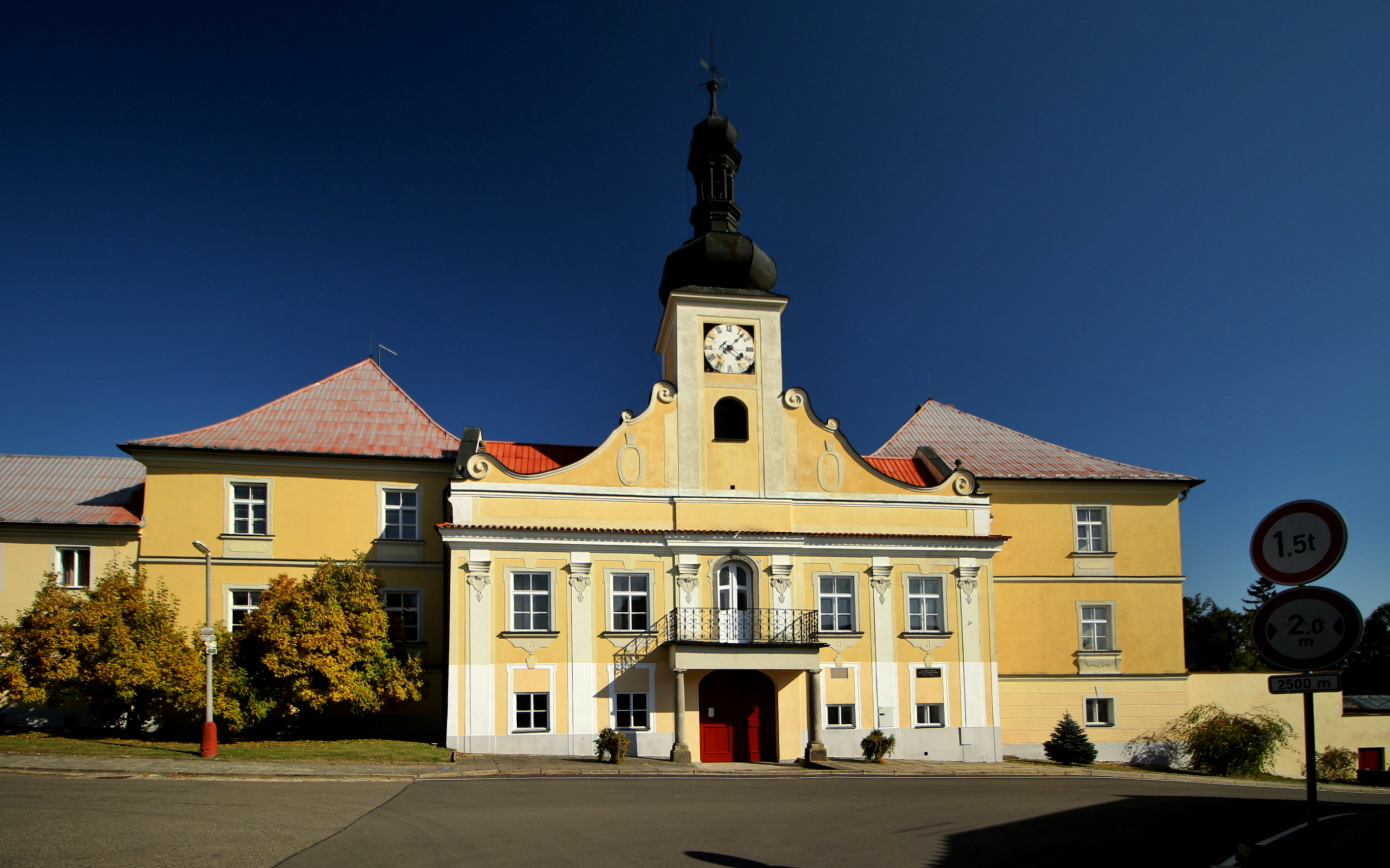
Stádlec Castle

Stádlec is known for its rare Stádlec Suspension Bridge over the Lužnice River. It connects Stádlec with the village of Dobřejice (part of Malšice). For its value, the bridge is protected as a national cultural monument.

Stádlec Castle was originally a fortress, first documented in 1535. In the 17th century, it was rebuilt into a castle. The castle chapel was added in 1712–1714. In the mid-18th century, the castle was rebuilt in the Baroque style and extended. Today it is privately owned and inaccessible.

== Notable people ==
- František Křižík (1847–1941), engineer and inventor; lived and died here
