= Podolí I =

- Municipality
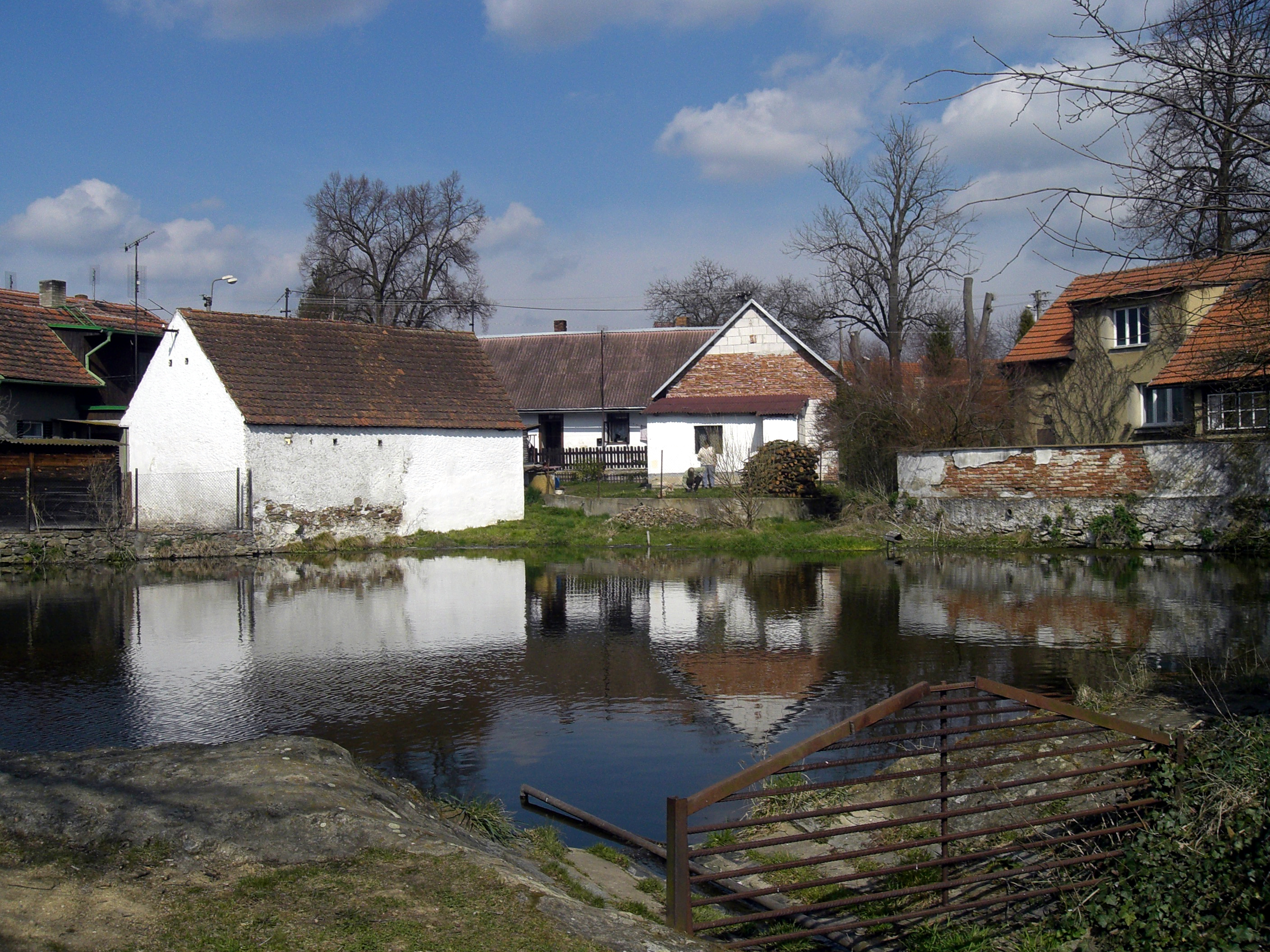
- Centre of Podolí I

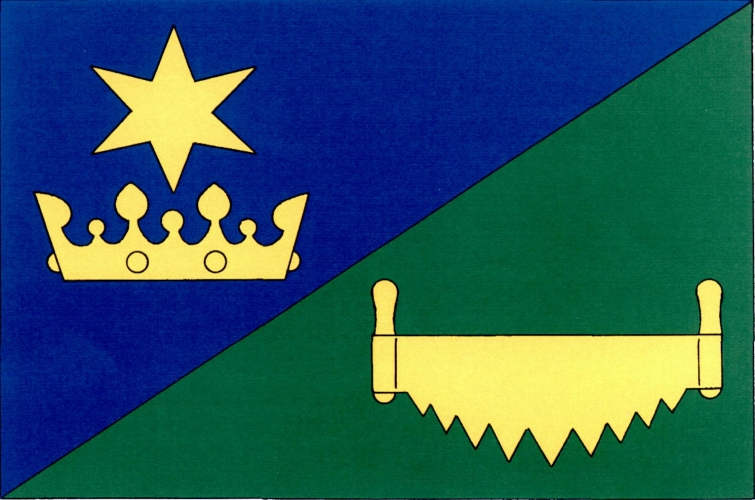
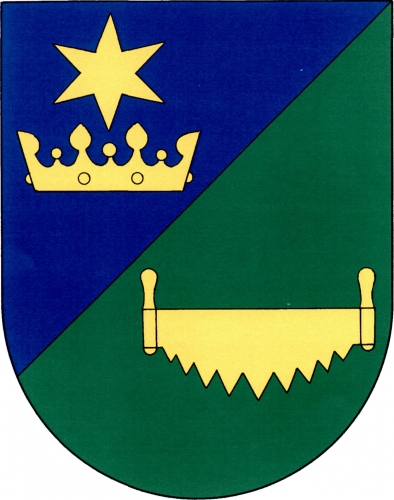
- Flag Coat of arms

- Location in the Czech Republic
- Coordinates: 49°21′40″N 14°18′43″E
- Country: Czech Republic
- Region: South Bohemian
- District: Písek
- First mentioned: 1209

Area
  - Total: 8.97 km^{2} (3.46 sq mi)
- Elevation: 454 m (1,490 ft)

Population (2026-01-01)
  - Total: 356
  - Density: 39.7/km^{2} (103/sq mi)
- Time zone: UTC+1 (CET)
  - Summer (DST): UTC+2 (CEST)
- Postal code: 398 43
- Website: www.podoli1.cz

Podolí I is a municipality and village in Písek District in the South Bohemian Region of the Czech Republic. It has about 400 inhabitants.

Podolí I lies approximately 15 kilometres (9 mi) north-east of Písek, 45 km (28 mi) north of České Budějovice, and 81 km (50 mi) south of Prague.

== Administrative division ==
Podolí I consists of three municipal parts (in brackets population according to the 2021 census):

- Podolí I (245)
- Podolsko (57)
- Rastory (48)

== Demographics ==
Historical population
Year	Pop.	±%
1869	633	—
1880	674	+6.5%
1890	643	−4.6%
1900	636	−1.1%
1910	555	−12.7%
1921	583	+5.0%
1930	510	−12.5%
1950	396	−22.4%
1961	381	−3.8%
1970	384	+0.8%
1980	404	+5.2%
1991	384	−5.0%
2001	355	−7.6%
2011	355	+0.0%
2021	350	−1.4%
Source: Censuses
