= Černvír =

- Municipality
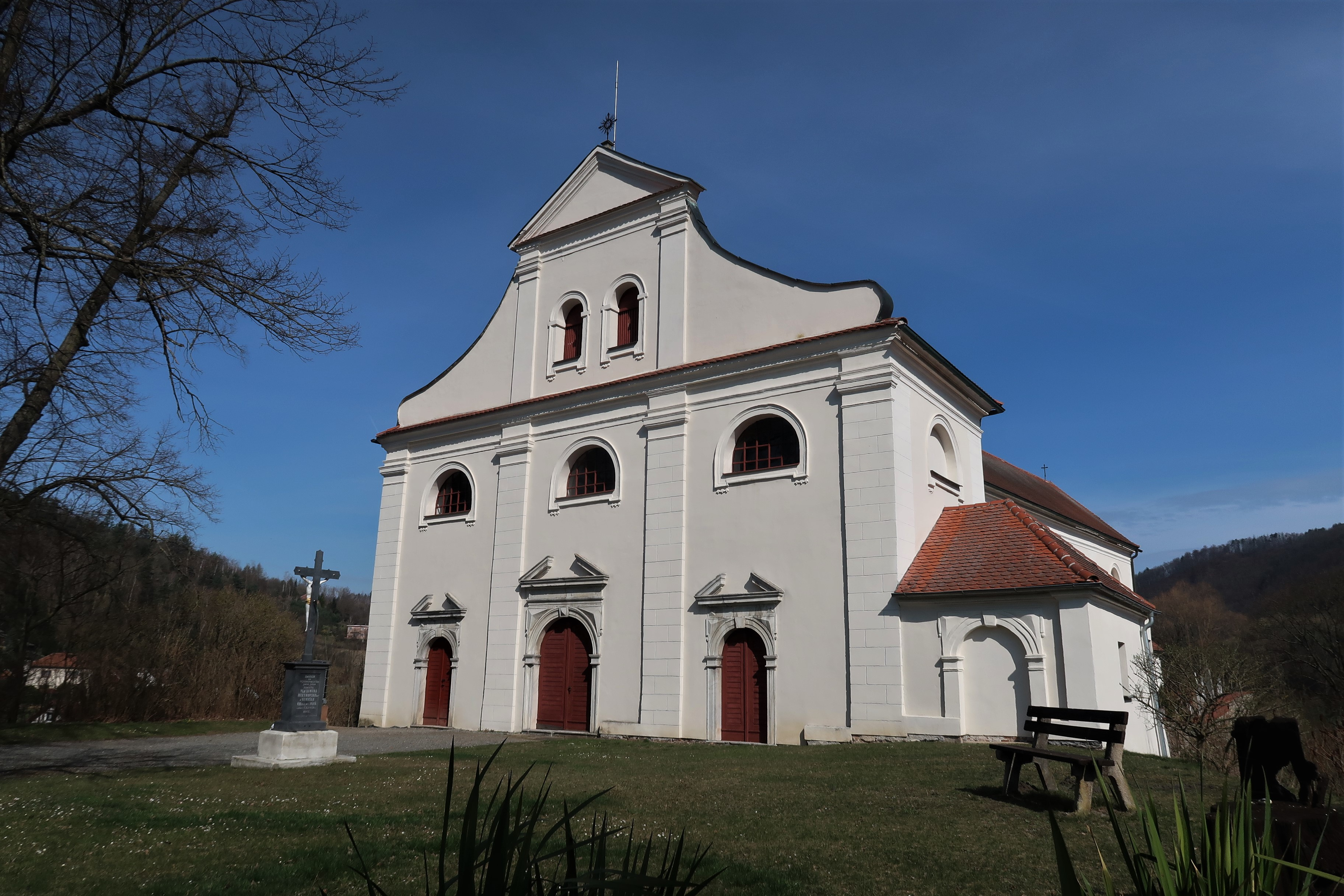
- Church of the Assumption of the Virgin Mary

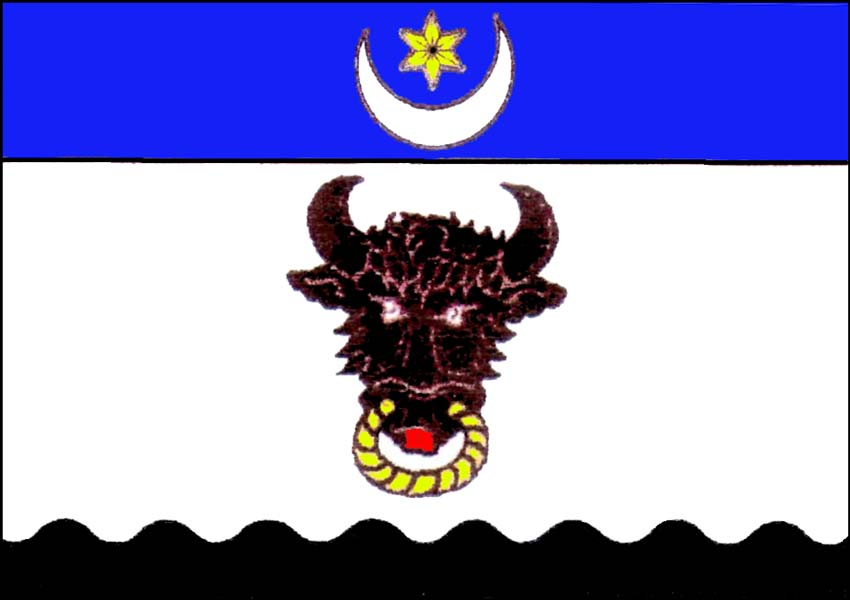
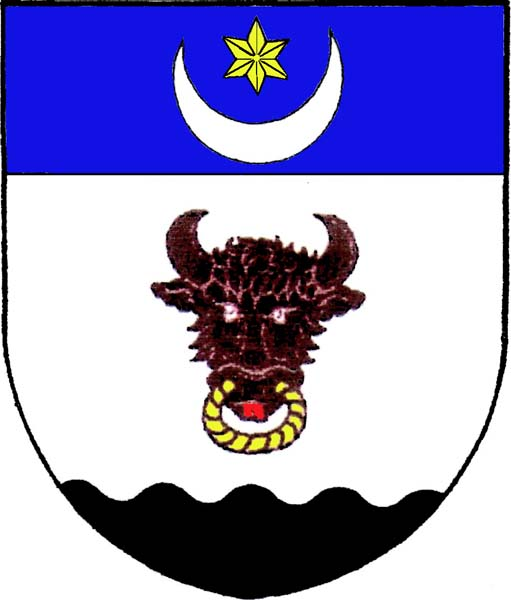
- Flag Coat of arms

- Location in the Czech Republic
- Coordinates: 49°26′43″N 16°20′46″E
- Country: Czech Republic
- Region: South Moravian
- District: Brno-Country
- First mentioned: 1285

Area
  - Total: 1.37 km^{2} (0.53 sq mi)
- Elevation: 315 m (1,033 ft)

Population (2026-01-01)
  - Total: 142
  - Density: 104/km^{2} (268/sq mi)
- Time zone: UTC+1 (CET)
  - Summer (DST): UTC+2 (CEST)
- Postal code: 592 62
- Website: www.cernvir.cz

Černvír is a municipality and village in Brno-Country District in the South Moravian Region of the Czech Republic. It has about 100 inhabitants.

Černvír lies approximately 34 kilometres (21 mi) north-west of Brno and 156 km (97 mi) south-east of Prague.

== Demographics ==
Historical population
Year	Pop.	±%
1869	145	—
1880	123	−15.2%
1890	122	−0.8%
1900	116	−4.9%
1910	169	+45.7%
1921	160	−5.3%
1930	204	+27.5%
1950	187	−8.3%
1961	211	+12.8%
1970	213	+0.9%
1980	166	−22.1%
1991	172	+3.6%
2001	157	−8.7%
2011	167	+6.4%
2021	146	−12.6%
Source: Censuses
