= Pňovany =

- Municipality
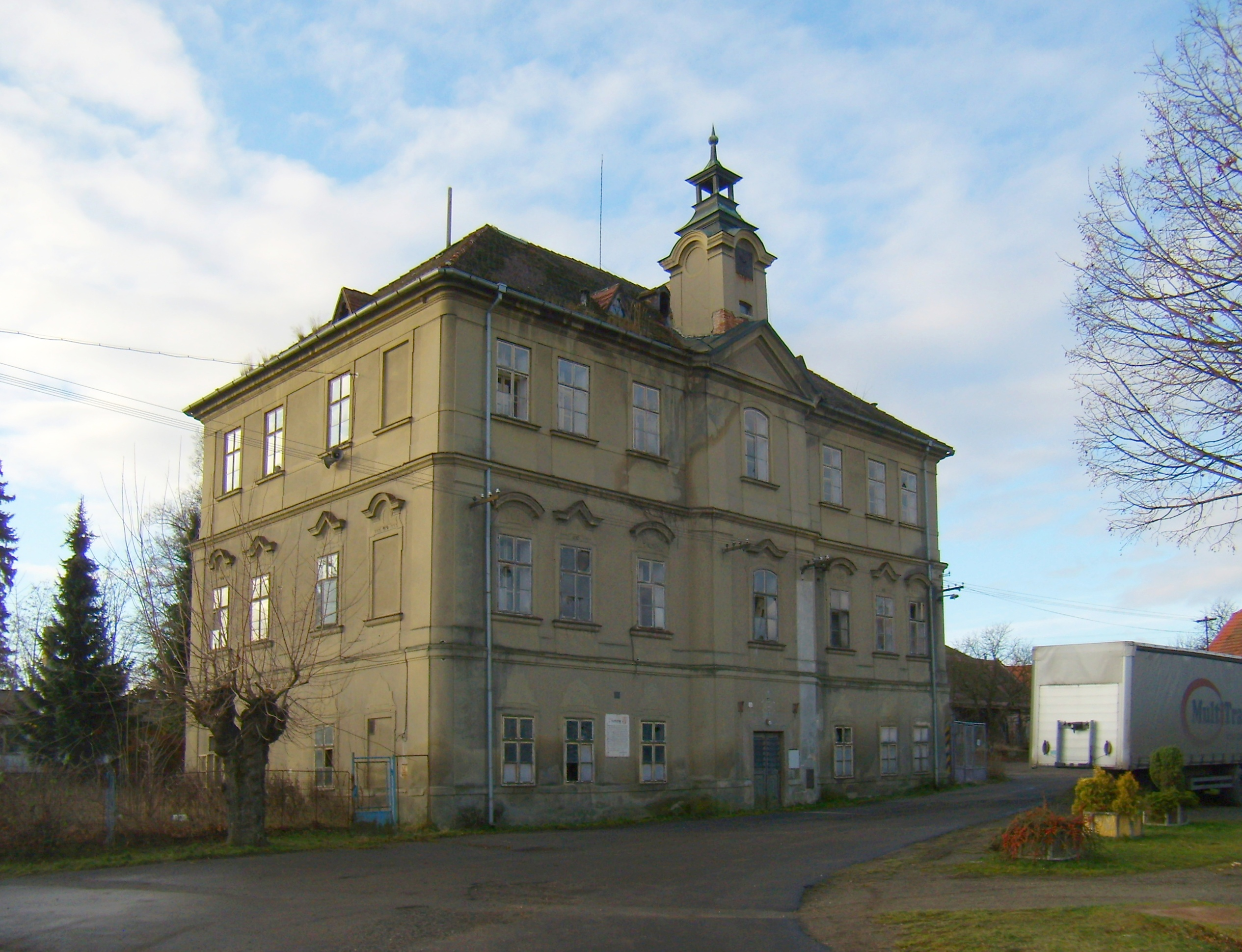
- Pňovany Castle

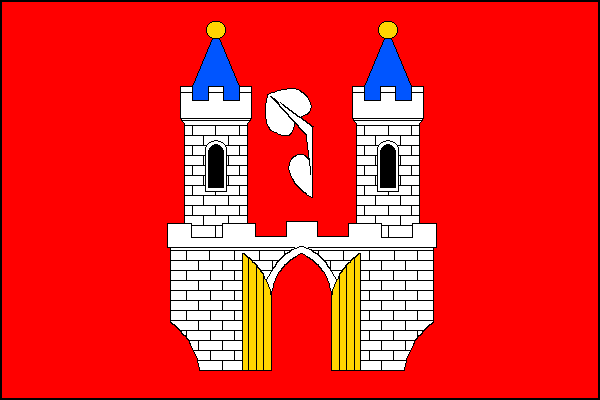
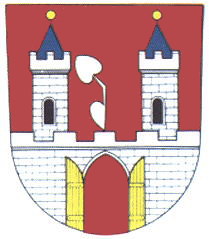
- Flag Coat of arms

- Location in the Czech Republic
- Coordinates: 49°46′44″N 13°7′19″E
- Country: Czech Republic
- Region: Plzeň
- District: Plzeň-North
- First mentioned: 1205

Area
  - Total: 18.42 km^{2} (7.11 sq mi)
- Elevation: 425 m (1,394 ft)

Population (2026-01-01)
  - Total: 468
  - Density: 25.4/km^{2} (65.8/sq mi)
- Time zone: UTC+1 (CET)
  - Summer (DST): UTC+2 (CEST)
- Postal code: 330 33
- Website: www.pnovany.cz

Pňovany is a municipality and village in Plzeň-North District in the Plzeň Region of the Czech Republic. It has about 500 inhabitants.

Pňovany lies approximately 19 kilometres (12 mi) west of Plzeň and 100 km (62 mi) west of Prague.

== Administrative division ==
Pňovany consists of three municipal parts (in brackets population according to the 2021 census):

- Pňovany (388)
- Chotěšovičky (7)
- Rájov (18)

== Demographics ==
Historical population
Year	Pop.	±%
1869	803	—
1880	797	−0.7%
1890	868	+8.9%
1900	889	+2.4%
1910	958	+7.8%
1921	974	+1.7%
1930	1,036	+6.4%
1950	642	−38.0%
1961	627	−2.3%
1970	599	−4.5%
1980	519	−13.4%
1991	406	−21.8%
2001	358	−11.8%
2011	418	+16.8%
2021	413	−1.2%
Source: Censuses
