= Podolsko Bridge =

Podolský Bridge
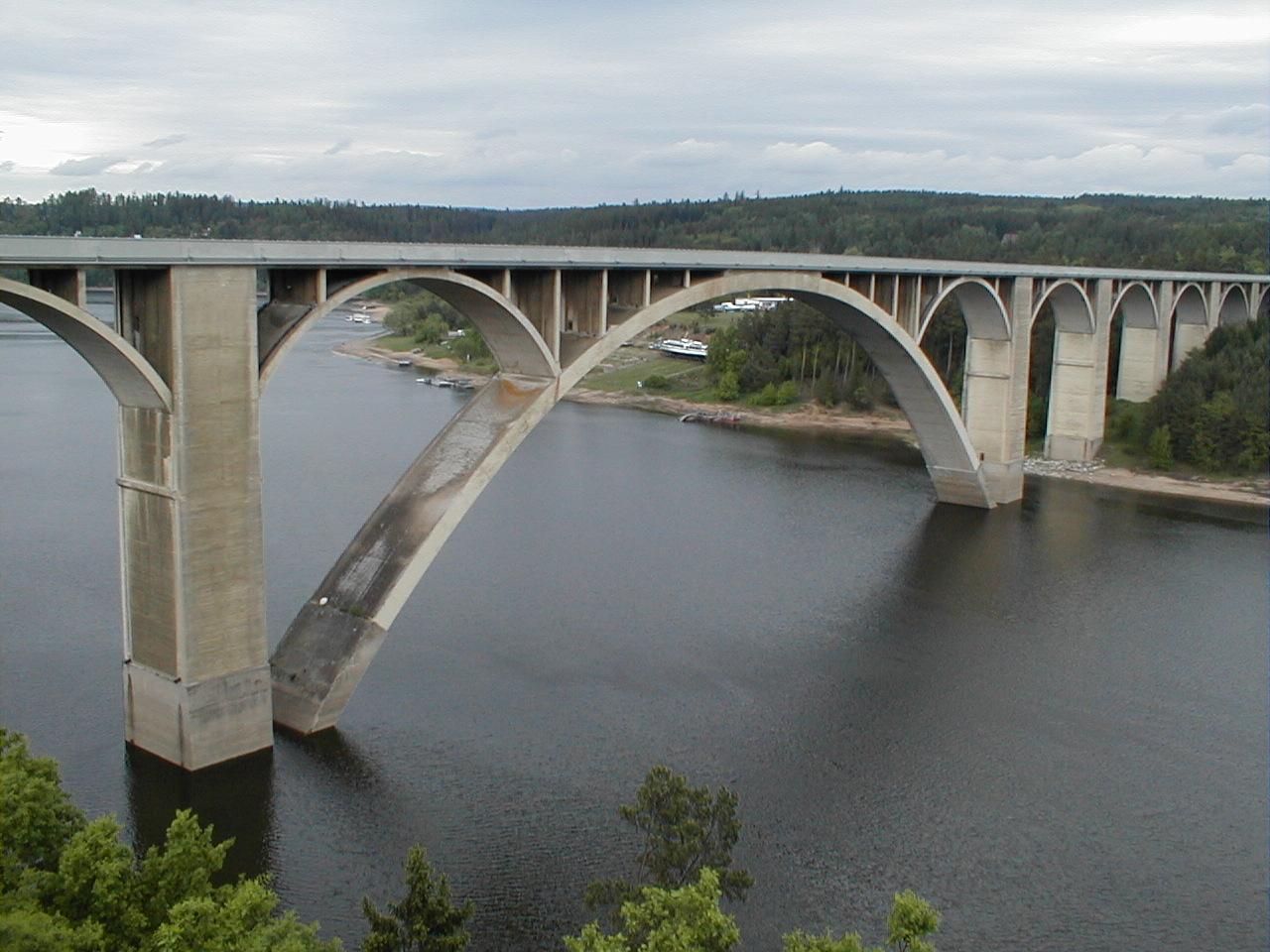
- Coordinates: 49°21′26″N 14°16′22″E
- Carries: road
- Crosses: Vltava
- Locale: Podolsko
- Official name: Podolský most

Characteristics
- Design: arch bridge
- Total length: 510 metres (1,673 ft)
- Width: 8.5 metres (28 ft)
- Height: 55
- Longest span: 150 metres (492 ft)
- Clearance below: 49 metres (161 ft)

History
- Opened: 1942

Statistics
- Daily traffic: 3896

Location
- Interactive map of Podolský Bridge

The Podolsko Bridge is an arch bridge that spans the Vltava between Podolsko and Temešvár in Písek District, Czech Republic. At the time of its completion in 1942, it was the longest arch bridge in Czechoslovakia. In May 1945 during World War II, elements of the U.S. 4th Armored Division took over the western end of the bridge and near by village of Temesvar, marking the farthest point the Western Allied Powers moved East on the Western Front.

Design was by the Ministry of Public Works. Experimental Stress Analysis photoelasticity was by Jaroslav Josef Polívka of the University of California.

After the Orlík Dam was completed in 1961, the Vltava rose 19 meters and covered part of the supports.
